= Angst und Vorurteil =

1989 book by Gisela Bleibtreu-Ehrenberg

Fear and prejudice: AIDS paranoia from the view of scientific prejudice studies
- Author: Gisela Bleibtreu-Ehrenberg
- Original title: Angst und Vorurteil: AIDS-Ängste als Gegenstand der Vorurteilsforschung
- Language: German
- Subject: Sociology
- Genre: Non-fiction
- Publisher: Rowohlt
- Publication date: 1989
- ISBN: 3-499-18247-5

Angst und Vorurteil: AIDS-Ängste als Gegenstand der Vorurteilsforschung (German: "Fear and prejudice: AIDS paranoia from the view of scientific prejudice studies") is a sociology book written by German sociologist, ethnologist, and sexologist Gisela Bleibtreu-Ehrenberg that was first published in 1989.

== Background ==
In 1988, due to her former scientific achievements Bleibtreu-Ehrenberg was appointed member of the parliamentary inquiry commission Enquetekommission AIDS that was formed in order to research into the disease's social, cultural, legal, and public health care consequences and challenges. While the commission's 1990 final report focussed entirely on bio-chemical epidemiology and prevention, Bleibtreu-Ehrenberg's influence was incorporated mostly into its 1989 preliminary report dealing rather with sociological, cultural, and legal aspects.

The book Angst und Vorurteil - AIDS-Ängste als Gegenstand der Vorurteilsforschung was based on the work of the Enquetekommission AIDS, as well as Bleibtreu-Ehrenberg's own final report brought forth in parliamentary hearings and towards the Helmut Kohl administration.

== Content ==
=== Leibfeindlichkeit, natural disasters, and epidemics ===
In Angst und Vorurteil, Bleibtreu-Ehrenberg on the one hand supplements the structural history of Western Leibfeindlichkeit (repression of sensuality) she related at a fuller scope in Tabu Homosexualität before, by pointing out in Angst und Vorurteil further aspects she had already brushed on in Der pädophile Impuls four years earlier. According to Angst und Vorurteil, an important derivational motivation of Leibfeindlichkeit was an intense connotation that was at first numinous, then mythological, then religious in nature, of sexual deviance with divine punishments for it, particularly natural disasters and epidemics. An obvious, exemplary line originated from the Old Testament where leprosy was God's just answer to sensual sins, especially sins of the flesh; by the Medieval Age, the Black Death had taken the former place of leprosy in ecclesiastical dogma. Just when early science dawned, syphilis came from across the ocean to the Old World, perpetuating the ancient cultural notions repressive towards sensuality by seemingly confirming the idea that lose sexual morals resulted in severe epidemics of fatal diseases.

Western society's own cultural misconception of sexuality only supported perpetuation of these ancient cultural notions, as this misconception saw sexuality as purely procreative and thus purely penetrative in nature, whereas any non-penetrative sexual activity, while actually running a lower risk of STD infection, was regarded as deviant and sinful. Thereby Western science was barred from even just slightly disposing all the religious and cultural superstitions pertaining to sexuality that the Enlightenment did away with in most any other field beside sexuality. Finally, the next significant loosening of traditional Western mores occurring after WWII, caused by penicillin and the anti-baby pill, was rolled back effectively in quite a similar reactionary process when HIV and AIDS arrived during the early 1980s, with quite similar cultural patterns as before of rationalizing derivations as ideological justifications, such as moral panics and witch hunts concerning factual or putative sexual minorities a.k.a. deviants.

=== Prejudice studies, sexuality, and Leibfeindlichkeit ===
On the other hand, in Angst und Vorurteil Bleibtreu-Ehrenberg gives a thorough, comprehensive description of post-WWII scientific prejudice studies, particularly regarding the reinforcement of traditional Western Leibfeindlichkeit (prejudices directed against factual or putative sexual deviance) triggered by HIV, and chronicles the field's academic history from its roots.

Bleibtreu-Ehrenberg's understanding of prejudice therein is largely informed by Critical Theory and its concept of the Authoritarian personality (also see the seminal study The Authoritarian Personality and Right-wing authoritarianism), but also incorporates, among other schools of prejudice studies, Labeling theory by George Herbert Mead and Howard S. Becker, Social identity theory by Henri Tajfel and John Turner, Frustration-Aggression hypothesis by John Dollard and Neal E. Miller, Social learning theory by Albert Bandura, as well as dispositif and discourse analysis by Michel Foucault.

=== Prejudice's main function: In-group cohesiveness ===
As one important pattern of prejudice can be named, according to Bleibtreu-Ehrenberg, that prejudice's main social function is creating and maintaining the in-group's social cohesiveness, united against a constructed foe or enemy identity (Feindbild) tagged on marginalized out-groups that are thus perceived as threatening and must be overcome by harsh measures correlating to how outrageous and abominable these minorities are perceived by the majority in-group.

Without such a negative out-group identity, there is no cohesiveness for the majority in-group which itself is based on the Authoritarian personality type, and indeed the positive in-group identity is only created as a response to the constructed negative out-group identity. The majority in-group conceives itself, its own role and identity, as direct opposite of these marginalized out-groups down to every detail; filthy sinners and other outsiders or aliens, who are basically regarded as evil incarnate and often tagged with dehumanizing, partly zoomorphic attributes, are contrasted with good, decent, law-abiding citizens, as the most dichotomous, yet most basic socio-cultural and socio-psychological distinction in Western and Indo-European culture and civilization since the beginning of the Iron Age.

Regarding the dehumanizing and zoomorphic attributes given to social out-groups, it is important to remember the influential cultural precursor quintessentially found in the archetype of the non-human, demonic, shape-shifting nithing fiend from Tabu Homosexualität (see the book's own article).

=== The Authoritarian personality ===
Bleibtreu-Ehrenberg links this in-group vs. out-group conflict model closely with neo-Freudian psychology, particularly the psychological apparatus of Id, ego, and super-ego and the defense mechanism of psychological projection, in its socio-cultural interpretation of the Authoritarian personality type brought forth by Critical Theory. Early on, from earliest childhood, people's socialization consists of internalizing the difference of "good" and "evil" impulses, resulting in a psychological apparatus where those impulses labeled as the most "evil" and "filthiest" are separated from conscious ego by work of the super-ego consisting of the most forcefully internalized social values, and by means of psychological repression the repressed impulses turn into the unconscious Id.

The more forceful and restrictive the socialization, the more authoritarian a super-ego will result, and the behavioral result of internalizing these restrictive traditional values is at first learning to masochistically deny and repress certain impulses, then later on the continuously pent-up frustration is acted out as sadistically passing on these restrictive values on to others, which in case of the in-group's intention to inflict in-group values upon a minority out-group as a whole shows as discrimination all over Allport's Scale.

Providing convenient targets for the Authoritarian personality's outlet, the negative out-group identity is created as a convenient projection screen made out of the repressed impulses; lowering the inhibition threshold for all kinds of discrimination including structural violence and even physical violence, the minority out-group is tagged with all kinds of negative attributes, partly dehumanizing, partly pathologizing, partly such mental and behavioral attributes that are factually harmful.

This process only works because the out-group is defined by not only imaginary or constructed attributes, but also by its factual attributes. The conscious mind of Authoritarian in-group members cannot even distinguish on the one hand between the out-group's factual and imaginary attributes, perceiving either as equally real. On the other hand, these in-group members are mentally incapable of distinguishing between any of the constructed imaginary attributes, as out-group members stereotypically appear to them as altogether and nothing but pathological, menacing, dangerous, abominable, and criminal, or, in a word, plain evil.

=== Prejudice resembles intrusive thoughts, discrimination is OCD ===
Bleibtreu-Ehrenberg thus defines Authoritarian prejudice as socially learned manifest, recurring intrusive thoughts (Zwangsvorstellungen) that may spill over into Allport's Scale discrimination, including violent hate crimes, as a form of obsessive-compulsive behavior (Zwangshandlung; also see Obsessive-compulsive personality disorder). Due to what Bleibtreu-Ehrenberg terms "distorted perception" (verzerrte Wahrnehmung, relating to Altemeyer's compartmentalized thinking) of constructed social reality, the prejudiced aggressor regards themselves as a rectifying, maybe curing agent, as an upholder of "natural order" and "society", and/or as protector of people they perceive as "victims" of the discriminated.

=== The Authoritarian and numinous characteristics of prejudice ===
Although ethnocentric prejudice is often pseudo-scientifically rationalized in Western modernity, it is inherently both modern Authoritarian and archaically numinous (i. e. a form of irrational related to magical thinking), in such that the following characteristics apply to prejudice:

- "Das Vorurteil sucht seine eigene Bestätigung" ("Prejudice seeks to self-corroborate"): The slightest imaginary or factual hint towards any individual out-group member conforming to prejudice is taken as undeniable corroborating evidence for the prejudice being justified (also see self-maintenance of prejudice below),
- Moral absolutism: Particular prejudices are often presented in public and private discourse as an absolute, unquestionable social consensus, as the bare minimum standards of any civilized society, with a wide number of irrational ethnocentric derivations provided as rationalizations, and
- Guilt-by-association: Any critic of prejudice is quickly suspected a sympathizer, even closeted member of the particular out-group.

=== Self-maintenance of prejudice: Prejudice, cognition, and social identity ===
As the human mind's cognitive structures are naturally disposed to both consciously and unconsciously gather and process information constantly in order to relate to the outside world, to oneself, and to one's own relations to the world (in other words, man constantly seeks and constructs sense, meaning, association, and belonging in order to understand and cope) also and most foremost in a social sense ("Who am I, and how do I relate to the social continuum around me?"), and because individual cognitive capabilities are as limited as that the individual is required to widely rely on social conventions in everyday life (which in combination with decreased instinctual drives is the origin of cognitive disposition towards social learning in primates), Bleibtreu-Ehrenberg posits that if no more positive social identity relating to one's traits is available, then even the most negative social identity, no matter with what aggressive and harmful behavior it is associated, is preferred to total loss of identity.

As also individual social identity, i. e. what social group(s) an individual identifies with due to their traits, is socially learned, it is that the more Authoritarian and hostile the prejudiced discourse on a particular out-group, the fewer positive social identities are available to be acquired by individual out-group members. Therefore, the behavior-guiding individual social identity of out-group members is strongly influenced by the stigmatizing labels applied by the majority in-group, and prejudice may yield the very pathological traits, the very aggressive, harmful, even criminal behavior in individual out-group members that out-groups are said to indulge in. In short, the majority in-group's dominant prejudices can thereby result in a self-fulfilling prophecy, a process which Bleibtreu-Ehrenberg dubs "self-maintenance of prejudice" (Selbststabilisierung des Vorurteils). For this reason, Bleibtreu-Ehrenberg dedicated Angst und Vorurteil to the prefaced motto Minderheitenschutz ist Mehrheitenschutz ("Protecting minorities (from prejudice) helps protect the majority.")

Furthermore, Bleibtreu-Ehrenberg expressly incorporates structural violence of the state, including involuntary medico-therapeutical intervention, as a form of discrimination, considering it a regulating, standardizing dispositif motivating further discrimination by "vigilant" individuals. Due to laws born out of ethnocentric prejudice, their potential to motivate "vigilant" hate crimes, and the tendency of dominant severe prejudice to self-fulfill, another prominent adage of the book is Falsche Gesetze zeitigen echte Verbrechen ("False laws ripen into true crimes.") which is also included in Bleibtreu-Ehrenberg's 1972 fiction novel Deutschlands Hoffnung, and her 1985/88 work Der pädophile Impuls.

=== Sexual deviance and prejudice ===
Throughout Western history, particularly factual or putative sexual deviance could only be seen as pathologically and thus counter-naturally motivated, harmful and corrupting in its consequences, criminal according to the laws, heinous and despicable to any decent person's sentience and morals, basically just plain evil. Most social out-groups in history were constructed by associating them with lewdness and sexual deviance, or, due to taboo making sexual deviance unmentionable directly, by means of cultural codifications for such that Bleibtreu-Ehrenberg related in detail after chronicling their cultural origins in Tabu Homosexualität.

Such cultural codes for lewdness and sexual deviance particularly included sadism, insidiousness, madness, weakness, cowardice, untrustworthiness, obsessive lying, betrayal, treason, evil sorcery, satanism, witchcraft, intoxicating drugs and poisoning potions, laziness, stubbornness, waywardness, incorrigibility, physical diseases and ailments (especially limping). These cultural codifications always have been, until the present day, largely identical with the imaginary, or constructed, attributes that sexual minorities were, and are, tagged with.

Additional such codifying associations were patterned according to particular sexual deviances, in such that these particular sexual minorities were perceived as either biologically or mentally faulted in a way that associated them with those social groups or social categories that their particular sexuality was regarded as naturally belonging to; for instance, gay males were regarded as effeminate, i. e. womanish, as women were regarded as the only category of people that could legitimately feel sexual desire towards men.

=== Countering strategies ===
Bleibtreu-Ehrenberg criticizes as ineffective the traditional approach to prejudice of assuming that personal contact with out-group members might decrease prejudice towards their group, by pointing out, for instance, the societal situation of Jewish people in Austria-Hungary prior to World War I. Even though the percentage of Jews in population was much lower in the German Empire and thus Germans had much fewer personal contacts with Jews, anti-Semitism was much more common and radical in Austria-Hungary than it was in Germany at the time. Bleibtreu-Ehrenberg explains this pattern as due to above-mentioned self-maintenance of prejudice, the fact that prejudice seeks to self-corroborate, and prejudice's tendency to self-fulfill.

Bleibtreu-Ehrenberg lists three assumptively more effective countering strategies:

- Authorities, institutions, and the mass media must provide the general public with less biased, less emotional, and less scandalizing information regarding discriminated out-groups.
- More positive social identities relating to the particular factual traits of out-groups must be constructed and brought to attention both of the general public and individual out-group members.
- Collaborative goals must be provided in order to unite the majority in-group and minority out-groups for the same causes.

== Editions ==
- 1989: Angst und Vorurteil: AIDS-Ängste als Gegenstand der Vorurteilsforschung, Rowohlt, Reinbek bei Hamburg. ISBN 3-499-18247-5
