= Hateful =

Hateful may refer to:

- Hateful Run, a stream in West Virginia, US
- "Hateful", a song by The Clash from London Calling, 1979
- "Hateful", a song by Post Malone from Twelve Carat Toothache, 2022

== See also ==
- Hate (disambiguation)
