= Hater =

Hater or Haters may refer to:

== Books ==
- Hater, 2006 novel by David Moody
- Haters (novel), a 2006 novel by author Alisa Valdes-Rodriguez

== Film and TV ==
- H8R, a 2011 American reality television show on the CW
- The Haters (film), a 2015 Armenian teen comedy-drama film
- H8RZ, 2015 American film
- The Hater (2020 film), a Polish social thriller film
- The Hater (2022 film), an American political satire film
- The Haters, also known as professional wrestling alliance the Thomaselli Brothers

== Music ==
- Hater (band), an American rock band
  - Hater (album), 1993
- The Haters, a noise music group from the US

=== Songs ===
- "Hater" (song), a 2014 song by Korn
- "Hater", a single by Everclear from Welcome to the Drama Club (2006)
- "Hater", by Yeat from 2 Alive (2022)
- "Haters" (TLC song) (2017)
- "Haters" (Tony Yayo song) (2011)
- "Haters" (So Solid Crew song) (2002)
- "Haters", by Hilary Duff from Hilary Duff (2004)

== Other ==
- Hater (common parlance), in fandom, someone who opposes something

== See also ==
- Hatred
- Hader (disambiguation)
- Hatter
- Hatert
