= Hate (disambiguation) =

Hate is an emotion of intense revulsion.

Hate may also refer to:

== Film and television ==
- Hate (film), a 1920 German silent film
- La Haine, a 1995 French film known as Hate in English
- "Hate" (Law & Order), a television episode

== Literature ==
- Hate (comics), a comic book by Peter Bagge
- Hate (book), a book by William H. Schmaltz
- "Hate" (short story), a 1961 short story by Arthur C. Clarke
- H.A.T.E. (Highest Anti-Terrorism Effort), a government agency in the Marvel Comics universe

== Music ==
- Hate (band), a Polish death metal band

=== Albums ===
- Hate, a 2005 album by Bassi Maestro
- Hate (The Delgados album), 2002
- Hate (Sarcófago album) or the title song, 1994
- Hate (Thy Art Is Murder album), 2012
- Hate (EP), by Hawthorne Heights, or the title song, 2011
- Hate, by Sinister, 1995

=== Songs ===
- "Hate (I Really Don't Like You)", by the Plain White T's, 2006
- "Hate", by 4Minute from Act. 7, 2016
- "Hate", by Cat Power from The Greatest, 2006
- "Hate", by Get Scared from Best Kind of Mess, 2011
- "Hate", by Jay-Z from The Blueprint 3, 2009
- "Hate", a song by Jimin
- "Hate", by Kiss from Carnival of Souls: The Final Sessions, 1997
- "Hate?", by Band-Maid from Unleash, 2022

== Video games ==
- Hate (video games), a mechanism in some MMORPGs and RPGs
- H.A.T.E. Hostile All Terrain Encounter, a 1989 video game

== Other ==
- H.A.T.E. (professional wrestling), a Japanese professional wrestling stable

== See also ==
- Hate crime
- Hate Me (disambiguation)
- Hated (disambiguation)
- Hater (disambiguation)
- Hatred (disambiguation)
