= Tabu Homosexualität =

1978 work by Gisela Bleibtreu-Ehrenberg

First edition (publ. S. Fischer Verlag)

Tabu Homosexualität: Die Geschichte eines Vorurteils (German: The Taboo of Homosexuality: The History of a Prejudice) is a standard work of Germanophone research into homophobia, written by German sociologist, ethnologist, and sexologist Gisela Bleibtreu-Ehrenberg, and first published in 1978.

== Background ==
Bleibtreu-Ehrenberg used the better part of the 1970s in order to complete Tabu Homosexualität: Die Geschichte eines Vorurteils (reprinted in 1981, then leaving out the word Tabu from its title) as beside drawing from scholars such as Mircea Eliade, Marija Gimbutas, and Michel Foucault, she conducted sociological research on homophobia and homosexuality, and translated previously unavailable or neglected artifacts and records from dead languages for the first time.

== Authority ==
Tabu Homosexualität is considered a foundational standard work in Germanophone research into homophobia, misogyny, patriarchy, general repression of sensuality and particularly repression of sexual deviance (Leibfeindlichkeit). As recently as 2007, the Berlin Department of Education (Senatsverwaltung für Bildung, Wissenschaft und Forschung) officially recommended use of the book in high schools as part of homophobia awareness trainings in social studies classes.

In spite of not having been translated into any other language as of 2008, since its first publication Tabu Homosexualität remains treated and quoted as a standard source internationally as well. As of 2008, it is found in a number of Western European libraries, and in the US is even available in libraries in 13 different states.

== Content ==
=== Introducing chapters ===
In the prefacing Einführung, Bleibtreu-Ehrenberg deals with the post-WWII mitigation of German laws forbidding same-sex activities, and her motivations for researching the issue of homophobia, an undertaking whereupon she came upon increasingly earlier and earlier manifestations each inspiring countless cultural derivations of this hatred.

In order to give an idea of the old age of negative prejudices directed against same-sex activities in the West, in Chapter I, Alte Nachrichten über die ethische Bewertung der männlichen Homosexualität bei germanischen Stämmen ("Ancient sources on the ethical evaluation of male homosexuality by Germanic tribes"), Bleibtreu-Ehrenberg mainly discusses many ancient European writers (mostly Greek and Roman) denouncingly accusing other tribes and nations across Europe as tolerant towards same-sex activities as was a common form of slander in Classical Antiquity, the absurdity of which is emphasized by the fact that writers of accused groups often accused the accuser's nation of the same thing even if ignorant of the original accusation hauled towards themselves. Bleibtreu-Ehrenberg thereby also demonstrates the strong numinous taboo regarding same-sex activities making them a near-unmentionable vice, as no rational explanation for this ostracization is ever provided, these activities are invariably depicted as negative in themselves.

Only three exceptions are mentioned where the purpose of slander is not immediately obvious: Greek philosopher Sextus Empiricus in the third volume of his Outlines of Pyrrhonism mentioned a tribe of Karmans among whom "lewdness between men [...], as is said, is not regarded as abominable but just like any ordinary thing". Bleibtreu-Ehrenberg identifies it as one of many examples of Sextus Empiricus's often-used rhetoric device of applying the most absurd properties to people, places, and other objects simply for the purpose of demonstrating basic rules of logic. The second exception is a note by Posidonius, quoted in Diodorus Siculus's Bibliotheca historica, on Celtic sleeping customs which Bleibtreu-Ehrenberg attributes to a misunderstanding of traditional separation of the sexes in daily life.

The third is an analysis of the common modern scholarly debate around the ritual killing of criminals regarded as altogether ignavi et imbellis et corpore infames ("cowardly, unbelligerent, and perverted") by proto-historic Germanics as mentioned by Tacitus in his Germania, whereupon Bleibtreu-Ehrenberg first remarks that the complex issue of common Western homophobia as apparent in the presented material must be analyzed at a wider, more interdisciplinarian scope.

=== Ethnic and cultural background: The Three Strata of Indo-European society ===
According to Bleibtreu-Ehrenberg's socio-psychological, socio-historical interdisciplinary approach to the topic of homophobia, drawing from research fields such as cultural anthropology, religious studies, ethnology, philology, and linguistics, the ethnocentric prejudice towards particularly male same-sex attraction and activities in the history of Western, Indo-European cultures is intrinsically identical to misogyny, thus originally gave rise to, and until the modern age maintained, patriarchal structures of Indo-European society.

Its roots and cultural elements can be traced back several millennia into Eurasian culture, and were originally based on the subsequent overlapping and conflict-ridden superimposition of the three basic ethnic and cultural strata (see stratification (archeology), social stratification, and archaeological horizon) underlying all modern Indo-European cultures. These three successive strata were the following:

- The Stone Age Subarctic Shamanic Culture of the last glacial period (called Würm regarding the Alps region, Weichsel regarding Scandinavia, and Devensian regarding the British Isles) ending c. 9,000 BCE,
- the Maternal Megalith Culture of European and Middle East Bronze Age, introducing farming and practicing fertility cults including sexual rites (c. 9.000 BCE to c. 3.000 BCE; roughly equivalent to Gimbutas's "Old Europe"),
- and the violent West-bound conquest of these regions by belligerent Proto-Indo-European tribes from Asia (see Bronze Age collapse, Kurgan hypothesis, and Æsir-Vanir War#Theories), beginning around the end of the fourth millennium BCE, introducing domestication of animals (particularly horses for purposes of work, mobility, and especially warfare) and cattle breeding, and initiating the Indo-European Iron Age in Europe and the Middle East.

See also Three-age system. Bleibtreu-Ehrenberg interprets these three strata as relating to the trifunctional hypothesis by Georges Dumézil, of classic Indo-European society consisting of three distinct classes, clerical (= Shamanic), agricultural, and warrior. Yet other than Dumézil, Bleibtreu-Ehrenberg does not regard all three of these components as genuinely Indo-European or Proto-Indo-European. Instead, in regard of the Kurgan hypothesis and what Gimbutas saw as "Old Europe", Bleibtreu-Ehrenberg considers these three components as the result of successive superimposition of what originally were the above-mentioned three different cultures, with Indo-European culture in Europe and the Middle East since the Iron Age as the result. See Proto-Indo-European society for details.

The immediate cause of Indo-European homophobia, misogyny, and patriarchy was an ethnocentric culture shock when Proto-Indo-European tribes encountered the highly sensual Maternal Megalith Culture in general, and particularly last traces of Shamanic ritual transvestism and sex change absorbed within this culture. In proto-historic Norse culture for instance, the resulting religious stratification emerged as the cultural strata of the subdued and marginalized Maternal Megalith Culture and the subsequently dominant Indo-European influence respectively transformed into maternal, fertility Vanir and belligerent, patriarchal Æsir religion, with the mythological Æsir-Vanir War as a distorted cultural memory of Europe's Indo-Europeanization, similar to the story of The Rape of the Sabine Women in ancient Italy potentially recalling the same proto-historical process.

=== Subsequent derivations within Indo-European societies ===
From there, Bleibtreu-Ehrenberg traces the genesis of homophobia via a number of historical derivations which exhibited increasing levels of rationalization:

- Chapter IV, Interdependenzen zwischen religiösen Werten und sozialen Normen bei den Germanen ("Interdependencies between religious values and social norms in Germanic culture"): Within subsequently dominant Indo-European culture, the originally highly regarded Shamanic priest of the subdued and marginalized Maternal Megalith Culture was ethnocentrically re-interpreted as an evil figure, and the former fertility rites as evil lewd magic. The least rationalized version of the resultant negative archetype of a lewd, non-human freak as apparent in sufficiently surviving artifacts and records is to be found in Norse sources, as the mythological, demonic nithing creature. Due to this lack of rationalization of the archetype's Norse version, it is the most pure, primordial version available to modern research, and the attributes of the nithing are thus the most easily identifiable among all the archetype's local variations as a negative ethnocentric, mythological re-interpretation of the Maternal Megalith Culture stratum under the circumstances of Indo-European cultural dominance. As explained in further chapters, this socio-cultural archetype of an evil, lewd non-human freak became a profound influence for every aspect about ubiquitous Leibfeindlichkeit (repression of sensuality) that followed from it in Western civilization.
- Chapter V, Tendenzen der Beurteilung homosexuellen Verhaltens von der Christianisierung bis zum Beginn der Ketzer- und Hexenverfolgungen ("Tendencies in evaluation of homosexual behaviour between Christianisation and the beginning inquisitorial persecution of witches and heretics"), section 1, Die römische Gesetzgebung ("Roman laws"): Capital homophobic tendencies in Ancient Rome as apparent for instance in Lex Scantinia (Bleibtreu-Ehrenberg does not cover Ancient Greece in depth until her 1990 book Vom Schmetterling zur Doppelaxt, only emphasizing in Tabu Homosexualität and later works that ancient Greek pederasty does not meet her primary focus for Tabu Homosexualität of same-sex activities among adult males, as in Ancient Greece, these relations took place between fertile and infertile individuals, by quoting, among other modern scholars and ancient sources, Kenneth Dover).
- Chapter V, section 2, Die kirchlichen Bestimmungen ("Ecclesiastical regulations"): Homophobia apparent in the ancient Jewish culture (Leviticus 18) and in Early Christianity (Saint Paul, early Church Fathers, and penitentials) up to the ninth century CE. Here, Bleibtreu-Ehrenberg debunks the Biblical origin of the common Sodom myth created by Byzantine emperor Justinian I in the 500s CE who was the first person in the world to claim that Genesis 19 would in any way relate to same-sex activities.
- Chapter V, section 3, Die gefälschten Kapitulare des Benedictus Levita ("The forged capitularies of Benedictus Levita"): The Medieval ecclesiastical concept of sodomy brought forth by the forged Capitularia Benedicti Levitae within Pseudo-Isidore (a collection of persuasive false material on theological, legal, and political matters fabricated by Frankish monks around 850 CE). During proto-historic Iron Age, the religious fertility rites of the marginalized Maternal Megalith Culture stratum had been ethnocentrically interpreted as the evil, lewd seid magic of a nithing in proto-historic Norse and Germanic sources. Referencing Justinian's Sodom myth, Frankish monk Benedictus Levita as the author of the Capitularia Benedicti Levitae obviously appealed to these prevailing folk beliefs when he strongly associated his idea of sodomy with evil sorcery, satanism, heathenism, and heresy. Thereby, he also originally incorporated the common Germanic practice of burning nithings into ecclesiastical law as burning sodomites and witches alike at the stake. Prior to Levita, church dogma had denounced belief in witches and burning people out of these pagan beliefs as sinful.
- Chapter VI, Die Pönalisierung der Homosexualität im Rahmen der Ketzer- und Hexenprozesse des Mittelalters ("The penalisation of homosexuality within the Medieval heresy and witch trials"): How Levita's ideas were put into practice by creating the Inquisition. Also discusses in-depth the Malleus Maleficarum as an extension and further popularization of Levita's original ideas on sodomites and witches.
- Chapter VII, Weiterentwicklung und Modifizierung des Vorurteils gegen die Homosexualität bis 1870 ("Further developments and modifications of homophobic prejudice up until 1870"): Arriving at the theories of pathology (Bleibtreu-Ehrenberg specifically mentions the concept of moral insanity), corruption, and downfall of the state brought fourth by the Age of Reason and the Age of Enlightenment, the history of these pseudo-scientific ideologies, and how they were instrumental in prolonging the traditional persecution of sexual deviants, especially homosexuals, in the Western world from the 17th to the 20th century.
- Chapter VIII, Beeinträchtigung der Erforschung des Vorurteils gegenüber der männlichen Homosexualität durch das Vorurteil selbst ("Obliteration of research into homophobic prejudice caused by the very prejudice itself"): Socio-psychological analyses of patterns and social dynamics of general and specifically homophobic prejudice and discrimination in Western society, building upon the facts, patterns, and concepts demonstrated in earlier chapters, emphasizing again the cultural impact and significance of Indo-European influence and the Three Strata of Western culture in general. In further detail than in this one chapter, Bleibtreu-Ehrenberg would re-visit this academic field of general Vorurteilsforschung (prejudice studies) in her later work Angst und Vorurteil (1989), in-depth analyzing in full the common patterns of prejudice and discrimination in modern Western society following from the cultural evolution described in Tabu Homosexualität.

=== Relations to other works, by Bleibtreu-Ehrenberg and others ===
In Mannbarkeitsriten (1980) and Angst und Vorurteil (1989), Bleibtreu-Ehrenberg further chronicles the re-enforcing influence of Western colonialism when Indo-European cultures began globally expanding from the Age of Discovery and Age of Conquests on, thus explorers and conquerors again came upon Shamanic cultures partly involving ritual fertility and sexual cults, and Europe simultaneously encountered the wide spread of syphilis through these new cross-cultural contacts just when modern science began to dawn.

These processes also fostered ethnocentric beliefs of Indo-European moral superiority over "uncivilized", sensual, and "filthy" "savages" (see for instance the saying of the White man's burden of being morally obliged to "civilize" non-Westerners), social and ethnic "aliens", and marginalized minorities in a complex process of interior socio-psychological, cultural structuring of human sensual desires on the one hand, and foreign political and military colonialism of these desires on the other hand. Thus, in all three books (Tabu Homosexualität, Mannbarkeitsriten, and Angst und Vorurteil) Bleibtreu-Ehrenberg alludes to cultural anthropology works such as The Origins of Totalitarianism by Hannah Arendt, Freud's Civilization and Its Discontents, Herbert Marcuse's Eros and Civilization, Critical Theory's Dialectic of Enlightenment and The Authoritarian Personality, or The Civilizing Process by Norbert Elias.

Finally, as Bleibtreu-Ehrenberg relates in Angst und Vorurteil, just as colonialism and the rise of syphilis had compromised the scientific Enlightenment approach to sexuality, the impact of HIV corrupted post-WWII progressive counterculture's influence on Western society's attitudes towards sexuality.

== Editions ==
- 1978: Tabu Homosexualität: Die Geschichte eines Vorurteils, S. Fischer Verlag, Frankfurt/Main. ISBN 3-10-007302-9
- 1981: Homosexualität: Die Geschichte eines Vorurteils, Fischer Taschenbuch Verlag, Frankfurt/Main. ISBN 3-596-23814-5
