= Hatred (disambiguation) =

Hatred is a human emotion.

Hatred may also refer to:

- Mollenard, also known as Hatred, a 1938 French drama film
- Hatred (1977 film), a Soviet film
- La Haine, lit. Hatred, a 1995 French film
- Hatred (2012 film), an Iranian drama film
- Hatred (2015 film), an American horror drama film
- Volhynia, also known as Hatred, a 2016 Polish war drama film
- Hatred (video game), a 2015 video game

== See also ==
- Hate (disambiguation)
