= J. Peter Neary =

Irish economist (1950–2021)

- Born: 11 February 1950; Drogheda, Ireland
- Died: 16 June 2021 (aged 71)

Academic background
- Education: University College Dublin; Oxford University

Academic work
- Discipline: International trade
- Website: Information at IDEAS / RePEc

J. Peter Neary (11 February 1950 – 16 June 2021) was an economist specialising in international trade. He was professor of economics at Oxford University, and a professorial fellow of Merton College, Oxford, as well as associate member of Nuffield College, Oxford. He was previously professor of political economy at University College Dublin, from 1980 to 2006. He was also a research fellow of the Centre for Economic Policy Research.

Neary was born in Drogheda, Ireland, and educated at University College Dublin and Oxford, where he completed his D.Phil. in 1978. He was an editor of the European Economic Review (1986–1990) and served on a number of other editorial boards. He was president of the Irish Economic Association (1990–92), and president of the European Economic Association in 2002. He was elected to the British Academy in 2008, and was a member of the Royal Irish Academy from 1997. He gained an entry in Who's Who in 2008.

Neary, together with W. Max Corden, in 1982 developed the classic economic model describing Dutch disease.

== Selected bibliography ==
=== Books ===
- Neary, J. Peter; van Wijnbergen, Sweder (1986). Natural Resources and the macroeconomy. Cambridge, Massachusetts: Centre for Economic Policy Research, Blackwell/MIT Press. ISBN 9780262140416.
- Neary, J. Peter; Helpman, Elhanan; Ethier, Wilfred (1993). Theory, policy and dynamics in international trade: essays in honor of Ronald W Jones. Cambridge New York, NY, USA: Cambridge University Press. ISBN 9780521434423.
- Neary, J. Peter (1995). International trade. Aldershot, Hampshire, UK Brookfield, Vermont US: Edward Elgar Publishing: international library of critical writings in economics. ISBN 9781852783617.
- Neary, J. Peter; Anderson, James (2005). Measuring the restrictiveness of international trade policy. Cambridge, Massachusetts: MIT Press. ISBN 9780262012201.

=== Journal articles ===
- Neary, J. Peter; Roberts, K.W.S. (January 1980). "The theory of household behaviour under rationing" (PDF). European Economic Review. 13 (1): 25–42. doi:10.1016/0014-2921(80)90045-8.
