= Annie Romein-Verschoor =

Dutch author and historian (1895–1978)

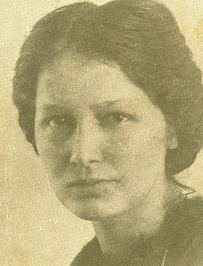
- Born: Anna Helena Margaretha Verschoor; 4 February 1895; Hatert
- Died: 5 February 1978 (aged 83); Amsterdam
- Education: Ph.D., 1935
- Alma mater: University of Leiden
- Spouse: Jan Romein (m. 1920; died 1962)
- Writing career
- Pen name: Alva-Betha, Anna
- Genres: Essays, historiography, novels
- Subjects: History, sociology
- Notable works: De lage landen bij de zee, Erflaters van onze beschaving (both with Jan Romein), Omzien in verwondering, Vrouwenspiegel, Vaderland in de verte
- Notable awards: Constantijn Huygens Prize (1970), Amsterdam municipal proze prize (1948), Dr. Wijnaendts Francken Prize

Anna Helena Margaretha Romein-Verschoor (née Verschoor; 4 February 1885 – 5 February 1975) was a Dutch writer and historian. Her 1970 autobiography Omzien in verwondering ("Looking back in wonder") was a bestseller. She received the Constantijn Huygens Prize in 1970.

== Biography ==
Romein-Verschoor studied Dutch and history at the University of Leiden, where she met and married (on 14 August 1920) the Dutch journalist and historian Jan Romein. With her husband, she would author two popularizing books on Dutch history that established their national fame: De lage landen bij de zee ("The Low Countries by the sea", 1934), a Marxist national history that reached a wide audience, and Erflaters van onze beschaving ("Testators of our civilization, four volumes, 1938–1940), a collection of 36 biographies of famous Dutchmen (and one woman, Betje Wolff) of bygone centuries, seventeen of them written by Romein-Verschoor. She joined the Communist Party in 1920 but had definitively left that organisation by 1937.

Romein-Verschoor's 1935 Ph.D. thesis was printed and published in 1936 as Vrouwenspiegel. A study of female authorship in the Dutch language since 1880, the work was reprinted in 1977 and well received by the resurgent feminist movement of the 1970s.

During World War II, the Romeins were forced to go into hiding. In the following Cold War era, they were politically isolated as non-affiliated communists. Romein-Verschoor always remained true to the communist ideal, but publicly defended Boris Pasternak and denounced socialist realism as a "constant distorting of reality to match theory". Nevertheless, she was highly successful and popular as a writer. Her 1970 autobiography Omzien in verwondering ("Looking back in wonder") became a bestseller.

Romein-Verschoor wrote an introduction in the First Edition of "Het Achterhuis," Anne Frank's original 1947 printed book about her diary, later reprinted as The Diary of a Young Girl.

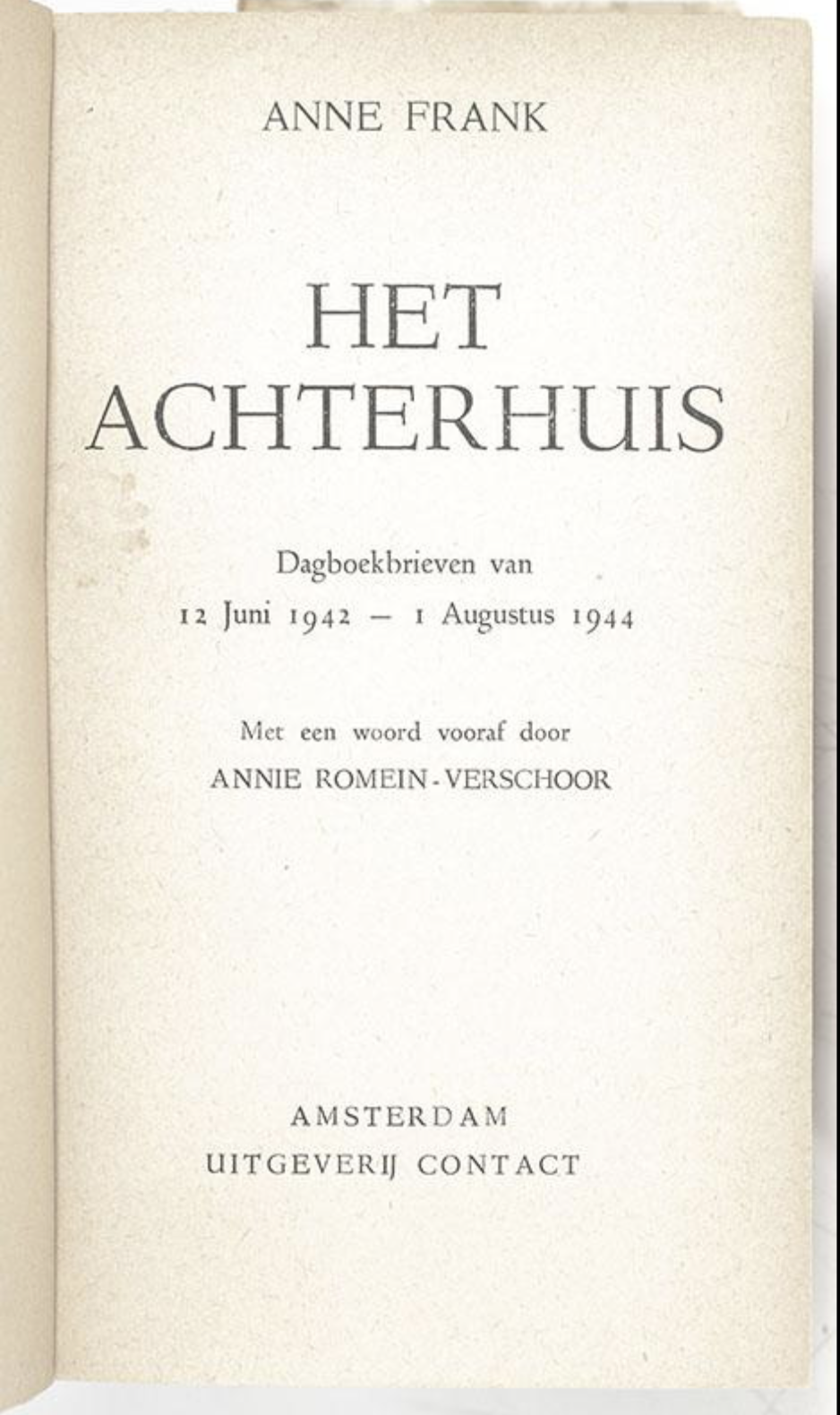
Photo of the cover page of Het Achterhuis
