= Norwegian paradox =

Analysis of the Norwegian economy

The Norwegian paradox is a dilemma of Norway's economic performance where economic performance is strong despite low R&D investment.

== Description ==
The Organisation for Economic Co-operation and Development has described Norway's economic performance as a "paradox". Other scholars also refer to it as a "puzzle". The concept has been developed due to the combination of low innovation and high economic performance in the country. Even when the rents of oil and gas sector are excluded, Norway's productivity and income are among the highest in the world. However, at the same time Norwegian R&D investment has a relatively small share of the country's GDP compared to other industrial economies.

It is a possible counter-example to the paradox of plenty (or resource curse).

== Analysis and critique ==
Although the concept of Norwegian "paradox" has been used in the literature, other researchers have presented further analysis and critique. Jan Fagerberg posits that the "paradox" should be analysed by combining three interrelated aspects of Norwegian economic development: innovation, path dependence, and policy. Norway's innovative performance had been scientifically influenced by the ability of Norwegian entrepreneurs, firms, and public sector actors. They were able to understand the hidden opportunities, mobilize resources, adopt current capabilities and develop new ones, and development of appropriate institutions and policies helped to support successful growth.

Furthermore, the historical development of Norway's national innovation system was impacted by path dependence. Norway has not been successful in developing non-resource based industries, yet managed to achieve substantial results in resource-based industry development and resource-based innovation elaboration. Norway's resource-based sectors have beneficially contributed to developing knowledge and adapting to new challenges. Finally, Norwegian institutions and politics managed to extend a relatively narrow definition of science, technology, and innovation policy. Due to this, broad perspective of innovation systems was successfully implemented.

Other scholars have suggested different analyses of the Norwegian "paradox". Fulvio Castellacci argued that characterization of Norway's economy as a combination of low innovation and high economic performance is inaccurate; the problem is not with innovative activities yet as it is commonly believed; it is more related to the sectoral composition of the economy.

== See also ==
- Dutch disease
- Resource curse
