= Mobile payments in China =

China is one of the world's leaders in the adoption of mobile payments. Widespread adoption of mobile payments in China has facilitated the growth of e-commerce in China and growth in the retail banking sector.

Digital payment platforms, alternatively known as e-payments, are the main medium of financial transaction in mainland China. Such e-payments, conducted through third-party platforms, make use of QR codes and personal barcodes. The use of physical currency and typical payment cards are relatively uncommon.

The market for these platforms is characterised by a duopoly, with WeChat Pay and Alipay holding more than 90% of China’s market share for such transactions. Several alternative, smaller platforms exist, including the People's Bank of China's (PBOC) UnionPay application.

Due to the rapid adoption of e-payment platforms in China over the last two decades, both WeChat and Alipay have become so-called super-apps, hosting a range of sub-features. This includes taxi-hailing, food delivery, ticket booking, and charitable donation capability.

Such platforms have, however, been criticised for making financial transactions more challenging for foreign visitors, whilst having several surveillance implications for its users.

== Development ==
China is one of the world's leaders in consumer internet and mobile payments. In most parts of the developed world, credit cards have been popular since the second half of the 20th century, but were not widespread in China. China's wide adoption of mobile payments without significant credit card usage is an example of leapfrogging development.

The increase in mobile payment systems such as Alipay and WeChat Pay have facilitated the rapid rise of e-commerce in China. Mobile payment platforms help simplify the transaction process and ensure the security of transactions to win the trust of consumers. Therefore, the mobile payment system has completely changed the daily life of the Chinese people and the future business model. The rise of e-commerce has, in turn, facilitated the further rapid adoption of digital payment and mobile wallets.

== History and emergence ==
Alipay was launched in 2004 as part of Alibaba Group’s Taobao.com. In 2005, it began strategic cooperation with several Chinese banks and later received a payment business license from the PBOC in 2011, solidifying its role in the rapidly expanding mobile payment ecosystem.

In 2013, WeChat Pay, developed by Tencent, entered the market, enabling users to make various daily transactions. By August 2015, the WeChat app had 600 million monthly active users, dominating the Chinese social app market. UnionPay entered the e-payment market later, in 2017, with its QuickPass contactless payment system, but did not significantly innovate beyond pre-existing technologies.

=== Explosion in Growth ===
Alipay first gained traction in 2011 with the introduction of its smartphone app, enabling seamless payments at retailers, cafes, and restaurants. Single Day was a dominant factor in fueling Alipay's popularity, with $17.8 billion in sales on Singles Day in 2016 via Alipay, with 82% of mobile payments, and is also a supported payment method for Alibaba's B2B e-commerce site. Alipay's global expansion included 70 countries by 2017 and partnerships in North America/Europe/Asia. This went further in 2012, when digital red packet distribution through WeChat Pay ahead of Chinese New Year became a viral sensation, further popularising e-payments. Such red packets are used in East Asian cultures to gift small amounts of money to friends and family.

In 2016, more than 32.7 billion red packets were sent via WeChat alone were sent over 6 days of the New Year holidays. The cultural significance of Red Packets sparked wider Chinese society’s initial interest and many first-time engagements with e-payments, boosting the appeal of digital transactions.

== Wider implementation ==
Alipay and WeChat Pay now dominate the Chinese market as the primary digital wallet options for most consumers, overshadowing traditional debit and credit cards. Three key factors contributed to this surge in implementation of such e-payment systems, rapidly transforming the country from a cash-based economy to a digital one.

Primarily, there was a supply shortage of 'typical' payment services in China. Compared to the financial systems of other countries, China has a low credit card penetration rate, and card payment services were often slow and inefficient, leaving a vast majority of small and medium-sized businesses and low-income individuals dependent on cash for transactions. Unlike contactless and card payment methods such as Apple Pay, a printed QR code and internet connection is sufficient for merchants to conduct transactions, enhancing accessibility and promoting e-payment uptake.

Another factor was China’s favourable regulatory environment. Until 2010, when the PBOC introduced a regulatory framework covering digital payment platforms, there were limited restrictions on mobile payment development. This led to greater levels of innovation from Chinese firms, with the government issuing nearly 270 third-party payment licences between 2010 and 2020.

Lastly, the high level of smartphone ownership and widespread technological advancement was vital to the implementation of digital payment platforms in China. By 2017, smartphone penetration in China neared 70%, a level comparable to developed nations, and markedly higher than other developing countries like Brazil and India.

== Functionality ==
=== QR codes and barcodes ===
QR codes and matrix barcodes are a common method to make or receive e-payments, where users scan a merchant’s QR code with a mobile app, select the payment amount, and confirm the payment. These codes facilitate all types of daily micropayments, from temple donations and street food purchases to bill payments, peer-to-peer transfers, and business transactions. They are favored for their accessibility, simplicity, security, and reliability.

However, the QR code payment system lacks universality, favouring e-payment giants Alipay and WeChat Pay. Both of these platforms have separate sets of QR codes, and do not permit for interoperability, preventing greater levels of competition between platforms. WeChat Pay strategically suspended intermediary transactions for “risk control”, forcing merchants to connect directly and sidelining third-party partners. Regulatory authorities face a dilemma, as many consumers rely heavily on these platforms, resulting in an imbalance of power that complicates reforms.

=== Facial Recognition ===
E-payment in China is continually evolving, with facial recognition emerging as a potential successor to QR codes. With this latest technology, users no longer need to pull out their phones; a quick scan of their faces completes the payment. Facial recognition payments, powered by artificial intelligence, biometrics, and 3D sensing, frees users from phone dependency. Alipay’s “Smile to Pay” system, launched in 2017, exemplifies this innovation, completing transactions within seconds and streamlining the shopping process. However, QR codes still make up most transactions, and facial recognition has not yet become a normalized, widespread payment method.

== Business Model ==
=== Multifunctionality ===
China's e-payments constitute a business model, emphasizing numerous functionalities over the expansion of the social network. E-payment platforms have created comprehensive ecosystems around their digital wallet services, enabling users to order food, book taxis, pay bills, schedule medical appointments, and even make charitable donations. This “app-within-an-app” model transformed these platforms into mobile lifestyle hubs that address nearly every aspect of daily life.

Such apps, particularly Alipay and WeChat Pay, act as independent operating systems, with millions of lightweight apps functioning like integrated web pages. However, the rise of e-payments worsened digital inequality, as those without smartphones or mobile payment accounts may struggle to access basic services in an increasingly digitised country.

=== Contrast with Western Models ===
China’s e-payment model, a fusion between payment platforms and social media sites with subsidiary functionalities, contrasts with Western platforms. E-payment platforms have successfully connected people and businesses through the app-within-an-app model, leading to higher transaction conversions. For instance, while Starbucks may post general offers on Facebook in non-Chinese markets, WeChat enables an integrated experience where users can view their favourite drinks or locate nearby stores in-app, significantly increasing profitability. This may inspire Western social media to follow similar trends in the future.

== Accessibility Concerns ==
Chinese digital payment infrastructure has proved challenging for foreign visitors to adapt to. As this system and its unique use of QR codes is unconventional for most tourists and visitors, studies have documented a high degree of initial confusion and difficulty in foreigners effectively engaging with these platforms. Given the difficulties experienced by foreign visitors, Chinese consulates and embassies have begun providing official guidance on the usage of such e-payment platforms.

What official guidance does not note is the difficulties associated with using these platforms without a Chinese phone number. Despite the ubiquitous nature of Alipay and WeChat in China, both apps have limited functionality for those without mainland bank accounts or phone numbers. WeChat and Chinese telecom providers are known to block accounts registered with foreign numbers, due to the prevalence of spam accounts in foreign-registered accounts.

A number of features within WeChat (including payments to certain merchants) require a Chinese phone number for full functionality. Additional limitations exist for users without a Chinese bank account, as non-resident users cannot transfer money to peers or send red envelopes. This poses a serious obstacle to foreign visitors, who may become financially stranded if their respective e-payment means are no longer responsive, or if they lack a local phone number.

== Philanthropic Usage ==
The introduction of native e-payment platforms in China has aided philanthropic programmes. ‘Handy’ philanthropy (a term used to describe charitable deeds done using technology) gives e-payment users the ability to engage with wider charitable missions within society.

=== WeRun ===
WeChat’s ‘WeRun’ function, for example, allows users to ‘donate’ their steps from walking or running. WeRun tracks the users’ daily steps and assigns them a monetary value. With corporate donations, these values become real charitable donations. This concept engages with the human desire to feel good about oneself while also encouraging competition amongst friends. Larger than competitors Mi Band or Fitbit Tracker, WeChat dominates this charitable market in China.

=== The Tencent Foundation ===
Aligning itself with the Chinese state’s goals of responsible citizenship in 2006, WeChat’s parent company Tencent has also pursued philanthropic initiatives, particularly through its launch of the Tencent Foundation. The Tencent Foundation was the first internet-based public welfare initiative to be founded in China. With a focus on improving access to education, its ‘digital wallet’ function saw a tenfold increase in charitable donations, from 10 million yuan to 100 million yuan, between 2006 and 2016. Alternatively, ‘Tencent Charity Hiker’, which launched in 2014, was designed to encourage students at fifteen universities to hike for charity. As a result, 2.43 million yuan was raised by 60000 donors in just one month.

== Privacy and data risks ==
Concerns have arisen due to the extensive nature of the data collected by these platforms, which gathers transaction history, location, and other social patterns, giving the Chinese state the capacity to create comprehensive profiles of individual behaviours. While data profiles may enhance users’ experiences by personalizing services, this prompts questions about data ownership and consent. The lack of transparency regarding data-sharing practices in China exacerbates such concerns, leaving users unaware of how and by whom their information is accessed.

=== Cybersecurity Threats and Data Breach Risks ===
Digital payment platforms like Alipay and WeChat Pay have become increasingly susceptible to hostile cyberattacks. Despite advanced security measures, the scale and extensive nature of these platforms’ user bases make them vulnerable to sophisticated threats. A significant incident in 2018 underscored these risks when a fraudulent third-party application exploited vulnerabilities in Alipay’s QR code system, enabling the unauthorized collection of users’ financial data and unapproved financial transactions.

== See also ==
- E-commerce payment system
- Payment services provider
- Mobile payments in other Global South countries:
  - Mobile payments in India
