= Hated =

Hated may refer to:

- Hated (2012 film), an American film directed by Lee Madsen
- Hated: GG Allin and the Murder Junkies, a 1993 music documentary film
- "Hated", a song by Beartooth from Aggressive

== See also ==
- Hate (disambiguation)
