= Leapfrogging =

Concept of fast advancement

Leapfrogging is a concept used in many domains of the economics and business fields, and was originally developed in the area of industrial organization and economic growth. The main idea behind the concept of leapfrogging is that small and incremental innovations usually lead a dominant firm to stay ahead, but sometimes, radical innovations will permit new firms to leapfrog the ancient and dominant firm. The phenomenon can occur to firms but also to leadership of countries or cities, where a developing country can skip stages of the path taken by industrial nations, enabling them to catch up sooner, particularly in terms of economic growth.

== Industrial organization ==
In the field of industrial organization (IO), the main work on leapfrogging was developed by Fudenberg, Gilbert, Stiglitz and Tirole (1983). In their article, they analyze under which conditions a new entrant can leapfrog an established firm.

That leapfrogging can arise because an established monopolist has a somewhat reduced incentive to innovate because they earn rent from the old technology. This is somewhat based on Joseph Schumpeter's notion of "gales of creative destruction". The hypothesis proposes that companies holding monopolies based on incumbent technologies have less incentive to innovate than potential rivals, and therefore they eventually lose their technological leadership role when new radical technological innovations are adopted by new firms which are ready to take the risks. When the radical innovations eventually become the new technological paradigm, the newcomer companies leapfrog ahead of the formerly leading firms.

== International competition ==
Similarly a country which has leadership can lose its hegemony and be leapfrogged by another country. This has happened in history a few times. In the late eighteenth century, the Netherlands was leapfrogged by the UK, which was the leader during the whole nineteenth century, and in turn the US leapfrogged the UK, and became the hegemonic power of the 20th century.

There are several reasons for this. Brezis and Krugman (1993, 1997) suggest a mechanism that explains this pattern of leapfrogging as a response to occasional major changes in technology. In times of small and incremental technological change, increasing returns to scale tend to accentuate economic leadership. However, at times of a radical innovation and major technological breakthrough, economic leadership, since it also implies high wages, can deter the adoption of new ideas in the most advanced countries. A new technology may well seem initially inferior to older methods to those who have extensive experience with those older methods; yet that initially inferior technology may well have more potential for improvements and adaptation. When technological progress takes this form, economic leadership will tend to be the source of its own downfall.

In consequence, when a radical innovation occurs, it does not initially seem to be an improvement for leading nations, given their extensive experience with older technologies. Lagging nations have less experience; the new technique allows them to use their lower wages to enter the market. If the new technique proves more productive than the old, leapfrogging of leadership occurs.

Brezis and Krugman have applied this theory of leapfrogging to the field of geography, and explain why leading cities are often overtaken by upstart metropolitan areas. Such upheavals may be explained if the advantage of established urban centers rests on localized learning by doing. When a new technology is introduced, for which this accumulated experience is irrelevant, older centers prefer to stay with a technology in which they are more efficient. The changes to technological leadership can reveal the challenges concerning the effects of backwardness on the willingness to innovate or adopt radical and new ideas. New centers, however, turn to the new technology and are competitive despite the raw state of that technology because of their lower land rents and wages. Over time, as the new technology matures, the established cities are overtaken.

== Leapfrogging in developing countries ==
More recently the concept of leapfrogging is being used in the context of sustainable development for developing countries as a theory of development which may accelerate development by skipping inferior, less efficient, more expensive or more polluting technologies and industries and move directly to more advanced ones.

Leapfrog democracies can refer to countries that have huge developments that more typically advanced countries might only have much later.

The mobile phone is an example of a leapfrog technology: it has enabled developing countries to skip the fixed-line technology of the 20th century and move straight to the mobile technology of the 21st. It is proposed that through leapfrogging developing countries can avoid environmentally harmful stages of development and do not need to follow the polluting development trajectory of industrialized countries.

The adoption of solar energy technologies in developing countries are examples of where countries do not repeat the mistakes of highly industrialized countries in creating an energy infrastructure based on fossil fuels, but "jump" directly into the Solar Age.

Developing countries with existing natural gas pipelines in place can use it to transport hydrogen instead, hence leapfrogging from natural gas to hydrogen.

== Tunneling through ==
A closely related concept is that of "tunneling through" the Environmental Kuznets Curve (EKC). The concept proposes that developing countries could learn from the experiences of industrialized nations, and restructure growth and development to address potentially irreversible environmental damages from an early stage and thereby "tunnel" through any prospective EKC. Environmental quality thereby does not have to get worse before it gets better and crossing safe limits or environmental thresholds can be avoided. Although in principle the concepts of leapfrogging (focused on jumping technological generations) and tunnelling through (focused on pollution) are distinct, in practice they tend to be conflated.

== Millennium Development Goals ==
The concept of environmental leapfrogging also includes a social dimension. The diffusion and application of environmental technologies would not only reduce environmental impacts, but can at the same time contribute to sustainable economic development and the realization of the Millennium Development Goals (MDGs) by promoting greater access to resources and technologies to people who currently have no access. Regarding electricity, currently nearly one-third of the world population has no access to electricity and another third has only poor access. Reliance on traditional biomass fuels for cooking and heating can have a serious impact on health and the environment. There is not only a direct positive link between sustainable renewable energy technologies and climate change mitigation, but also between clean energy and issues of health, education and gender equity.

== Examples ==
A frequently cited example is countries which move directly from having no telephones to having cellular phones, skipping the stage of copper-wire landline telephones altogether.

Another notable example is mobile payment. China is one of the world's leaders in consumer internet and mobile payments. In most parts of the developed world, credit cards have been popular since the second half of 20th century but were not widespread in China. After 2013, Alipay and WeChat began to support mobile payment using QR code on smart phones. Both of them have been extremely successful in China and are expanding overseas now. China's technological leapfrogging to mobile payments also led to a boom in online shopping and retail banking. The expansion of e-commerce in China is another example of leapfrogging development. Although China was a latecomer to e-commerce in comparison to other major economies, it has now grown beyond them in both total market size and on a per capita basis.

== Necessary conditions ==
Leapfrogging can occur accidentally, when the only systems around for adoption are better than legacy systems elsewhere, or situationally, such as the adoption of decentralized communication for a sprawling, rural countryside. It may also be initiated intentionally, e.g. by policies promoting the installation of WiFi and free computers in poor urban areas.

The Reut Institute has carried out extensive research regarding the common denominators of all the different countries that have successfully leapt in recent years. It concludes that to leapfrog a country needs to create a shared vision, leadership by a committed elite, inclusive growth, relevant institutions, a labor market suited to cope with rapid growth and changes, growth diagnostics of the country's bottlenecks and focused reforms as well as local and regional development and national mobilization.

== Promotion by international initiatives ==
Japan's Low-Carbon Society 2050 Initiative has the objective to cooperate with and offer support to Asian developing countries to leapfrog towards a low-carbon energy future.

== See also ==
- Digital divide – Inequality of access to information and communication technologies
- Law of the handicap of a head start – Phenomenon of an initial advantage not lasting
- Legacy systems – Old computing technology or system that remains in use
- Paradigm shift – Fundamental change in ideas and practices within a scientific discipline
- Renewable energy – Energy collected from renewable resources
- Societal impacts of cars – Overview of the effects of cars on various societies
- Sustainable development – Mode of human development
- Smart mobility – Electric cars, alternatives to cars, rentals
- Technology transfer – Process of disseminating technology
