= Law of the handicap of a head start =

Phenomenon of an initial advantage not lasting

The law of the handicap of a head start (original Dutch: Wet van de remmende voorsprong), also known as the pioneer's curse, first-mover disadvantage or dialectics of lead, is a theory in economic history and technological development that proposes that an initial head start in a particular domain may paradoxically become a handicap over time.

The theory suggests that early adopters or pioneers may become entrenched in their initial infrastructure, technology, or methodologies, making them resistant to change and vulnerable to being overtaken by late adopters who can implement newer, more efficient systems without the burden of sunk costs or path dependence. The complementary principle—the law of the stimulative arrears (wet van de stimulerende achterstand)—proposes that regions or organizations initially lagging behind may benefit from a form of leapfrogging, bypassing intermediate stages of development to implement the most current solutions.

This concept directly challenges the better-known first-mover advantage theory in business strategy and competitive market economics, which emphasizes the benefits of being the first to enter a market. Historical examples supporting the theory include Britain's early industrialization becoming a handicap when newer manufacturing methods emerged, and established urban infrastructures becoming obstacles to modernization compared to newly developed cities. The theory has applications across domains including economic development, technological innovation, institutional change, and international relations.

This concept was introduced in 1937 by Jan Romein, a Dutch historian and journalist, in his essay "The Dialectics of Progress" ("De dialectiek van de vooruitgang"), which appeared in his collection "The Unfinished Past" (Het onvoltooid verleden).

== The phenomenon ==
The law of the handicap of a head start describes a phenomenon that is applicable in numerous settings. The law suggests that making progress in a particular area often creates circumstances in which stimuli are lacking to strive for further progress. This results in the individual or group that started out ahead eventually being overtaken by others. In the terminology of the law, the head start, initially an advantage, subsequently becomes a handicap.

An explanation for why the phenomenon occurs is that when a society dedicates itself to certain standards, and those standards change, it is harder for them to adapt. Conversely, a society that has not committed itself yet will not have this problem. Thus, a society that at one point has a head start over other societies, may, at a later time, be stuck with obsolete technology or ideas that get in the way of further progress. One consequence of this is that what is considered to be the state of the art in a certain field can be seen as "jumping" from place to place, as each leader soon becomes a victim of the handicap.

In common terms, societies, companies, and individuals are often confronted with the decision to either invest now and get a fast return, or put off the investment until a new technology has emerged and possibly make a bigger profit then. For example, a regular problem for individuals is the decision of when to buy a new computer. Since computer speed develops at a steady pace, delaying the investment for a year may mean having to make do with a slower (or no) computer for the first year, but after that the individual will be able to buy a better computer for the same price. In many cases, however, the technological development is not as predictable as this, so it is harder to make an informed decision.

A related law that can be considered as the contrary of this law is the Law of the stimulative arrears (Wet van de stimulerende achterstand) published by Erik van der Hoeven in 1980.

== Examples ==
The author gives an example of the law in his original essay. During a trip to London, he wonders why at that time it was still lit by gas lamps, rather than electric lights as were by then common in other European capitals like Amsterdam. His explanation was that London's head start—their possession of street lights before most other cities—was now holding them back in replacing them with the more modern electric lights. As the streets were already lit there was no pressing need to replace gas lamps, despite the other advantages of electric lighting.

== Free-rider effects ==
Secondary or late-movers to an industry or market have the opportunity to study first-movers and their techniques and strategies. "Late movers may be able to 'free-ride' on a pioneering firms investments in a number of areas including R&D, buyer education, and infrastructure development. The basic principle of this effect is that the competition is allowed to benefit and not incur the costs which the first-mover has to sustain. These "imitation costs" are much lower than the "innovation costs" the first-mover had to incur, and can also cut into the profits the pioneering firm would otherwise enjoy.

Studies of free-rider effects say the biggest benefit is riding the coattails of a company's research and development, and learning-based productivity improvement. Other studies have looked at free rider effects in relation to labor costs, as first-movers may have to hire and train personnel to succeed, only to have the competition hire them away. For example, Craigslist was the first and biggest website to look for short-term rentals. AirBnB came in a few years after and built a massive business at the expense of Craigslist.

== Resolution of technological or market uncertainty ==
First-movers must deal with the entire risk associated with developing a new technology and creating a new market for it. Late-movers have the advantage of not sustaining those risks to the same extent. While first-movers have nothing to draw upon when deciding potential revenues and firm sizes, late-movers are able to follow industry standards and adjust accordingly. The first-mover must take on all the risk as these standards are set, and in some cases they do not last long enough to operate under the new standards.

== Shifts in technology or customer needs ==
"New entrants exploit technological discontinuities to displace existing incumbents." Late entrants are sometimes able to assess a market need that will cause an initial product to be seen as inferior. This can occur when the first-mover does not adapt or see the change in customer needs, or when a competitor develops a better, more efficient, and sometimes less-expensive product. Often this new technology is introduced while the older technology is still growing, and the new technology may not be seen as an immediate threat.

An example of this is the steam locomotive industry not responding to the invention and commercialization of diesel fuel (Cooper and Schendel, 1976). This disadvantage is closely related to incumbent inertia, and occurs if the firm is unable to recognize a change in the market, or if a ground-breaking technology is introduced. In either case, the first-movers are at a disadvantage in that although they created the market, they have to sustain it, and can miss opportunities to advance while trying to preserve what they already have.

== Up-front investment costs ==
New products and services which require significant R&D or development will also require significant investments. Therefore, the firms will need to have the funds available to be able to deal with the up-front investments. If they don't have the cash on hand, this could lead to high loans and debts which puts increased pressure on the products to do well.

=== Magnitude and duration of first-mover advantages ===
Though the name "first-mover advantage" hints that pioneering firms will remain more profitable than their competitors, this is not always the case. Certainly a pioneering firm will reap the benefits of early profits, but sometimes profits fall close to zero as a patent expires. This commonly leads to the sale of the patent, or exit from the market, which shows that the first-mover is not guaranteed longevity. This commonly accepted fact has led to the concept known as "second-mover advantage".

== Incumbent inertia ==
While firms enjoy the success of being the first entrant into the market, they can also become complacent and not fully capitalize on their opportunity. According to Lieberman and Montgomery:

Vulnerability of the first-mover is often enhanced by 'incumbent inertia'. Such inertia can have several root causes:

1. the firm may be locked into a specific set of fixed assets,
2. the firm may be reluctant to cannibalize existing product lines, or
3. the firm may become organizationally inflexible.

Firms that have heavily invested in fixed assets cannot readily adjust to the new challenges of the market, as they have less financial ability to change. Firms that simply do not wish to change their strategy or products and incur sunk costs from "cannibalizing" or changing the core of their business, fall victim to this inertia. Such firms are less likely to be able to operate in a changing and competitive environment. They may pour too much of their assets into what works in the beginning, and not project what will be needed long term.

Some studies which investigated why incumbent organizations are unable to be sustained in the face of new challenges and technology, pinpointed other aspects of incumbents' failures. These included: "the development of organizational routines and standards, internal political dynamics, and the development of stable exchange relations with other organizations" (Hannan and Freeman, 1984).

All in all, some firms are too rigid and invested in the "now", and are unable to project the future to continue to maximize their current market stronghold.

== See also ==
- Convergence (economics) (or catch-up effect)
- Dutch disease
- Leapfrogging
- Resource curse
