= Dutch disease =

Theory in economics

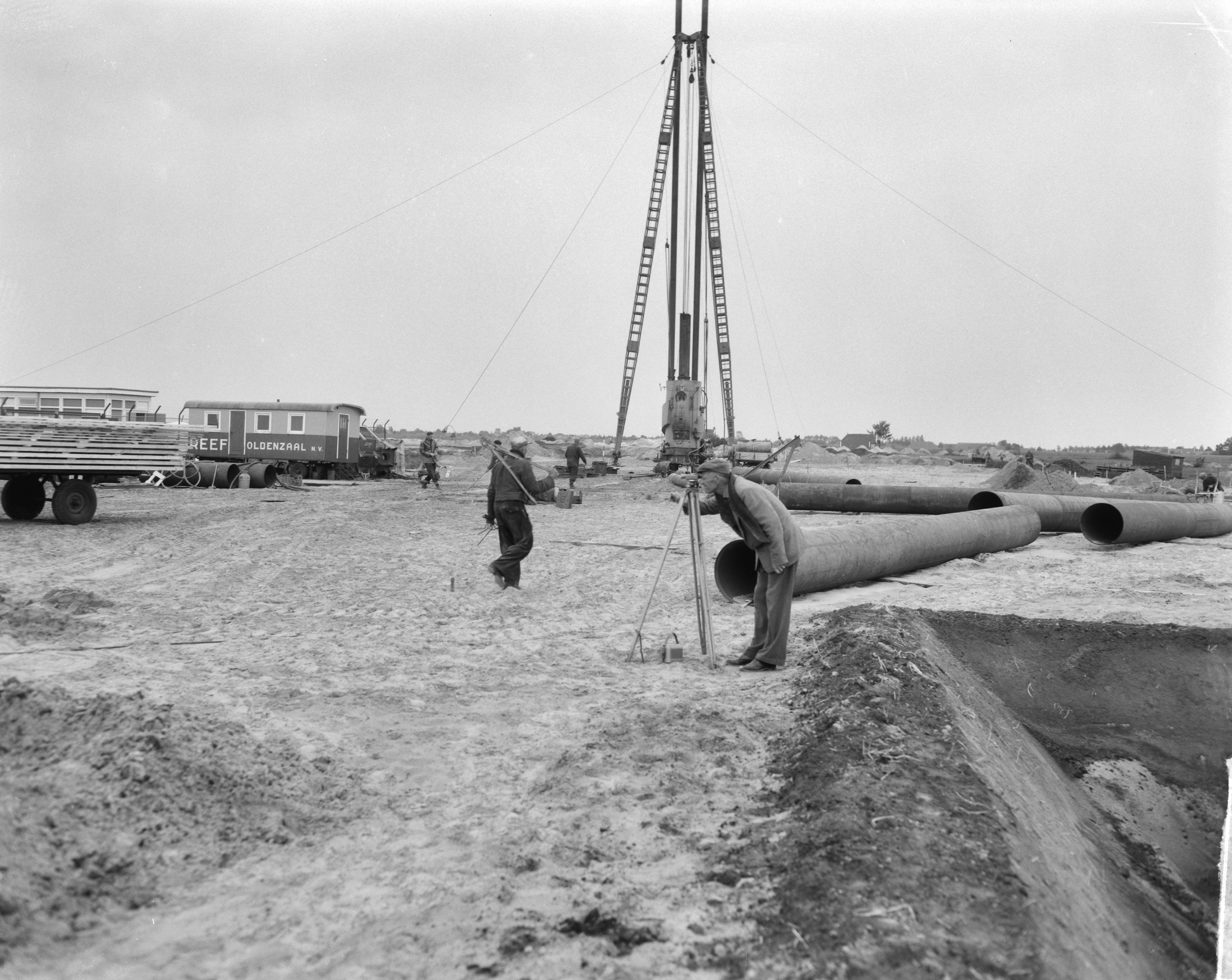
The Groningen gas field in 1963

In economics, Dutch disease is the apparent causal relationship between the increase in the economic development of a specific sector (for example, natural resources) and a decline in other sectors (like the manufacturing sector or agriculture). The term was coined in 1977 by The Economist to describe the decline of the manufacturing sector in the Netherlands after the discovery of the large Groningen gas field in 1959.

The presumed mechanism is that while revenues increase in a growing sector (or inflows of foreign aid), the given economy's currency becomes stronger ("appreciates") compared to foreign currencies (manifested in the exchange rate). This results in the country's other exports becoming more expensive for other countries, while imports become cheaper, rendering those sectors less competitive. While it most often refers to natural resource discovery, it can also refer to "any development that results in a large inflow of foreign currency, including a sharp surge in natural resource prices, foreign assistance, and foreign direct investment".

== Model ==
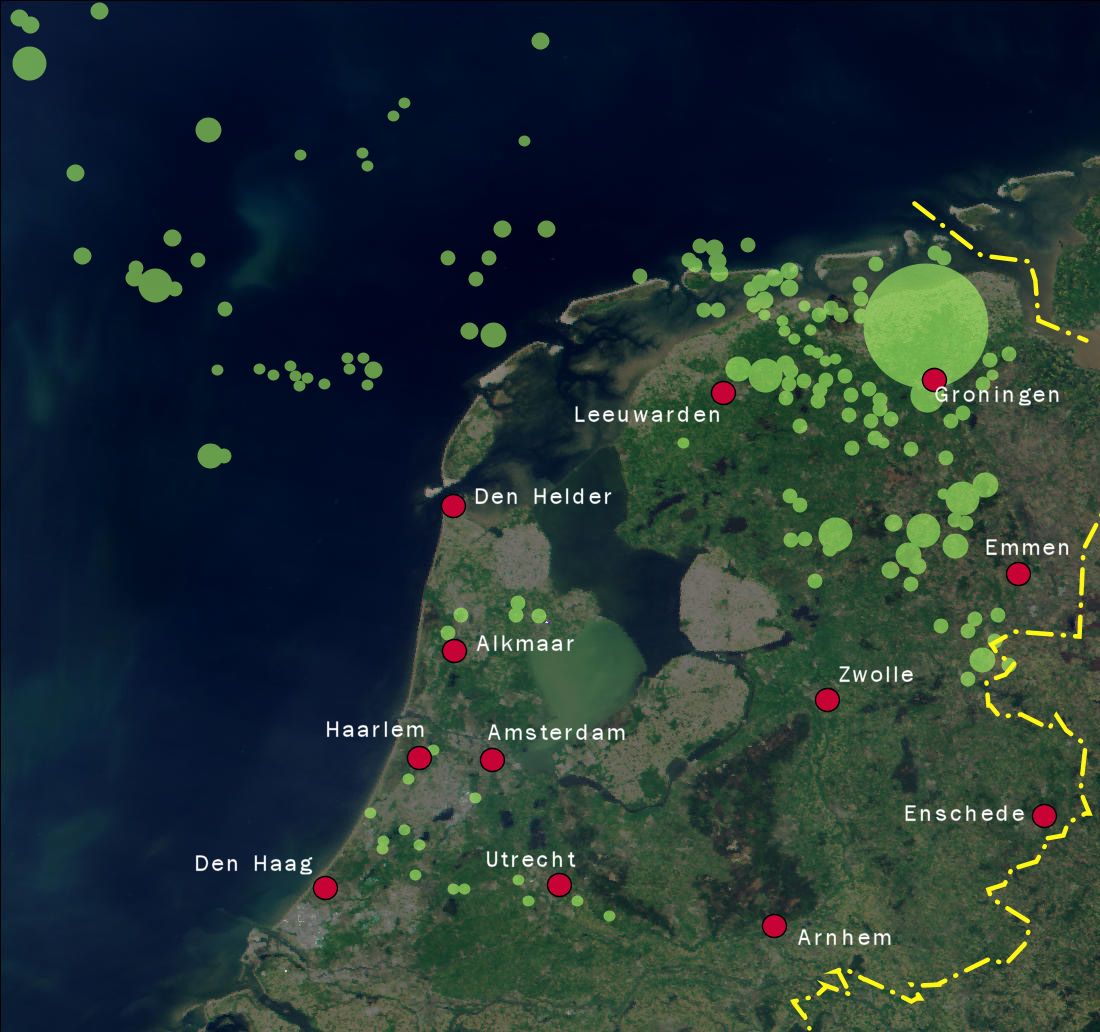
Natural gas concessions in the Netherlands (June 2008) accounted for more than 25% of all natural gas reserves in the European Union.

The classic economic model describing Dutch disease was developed by economists W. Max Corden and J. Peter Neary in 1982. In the model, there is a non-tradable sector (which includes services) and two tradable sectors: the booming sector, and the lagging (or non-booming) tradable sector. The booming sector is usually the extraction of natural resources such as oil, natural gas, gold, copper, diamonds, or bauxite, or the production of crops, such as coffee or cocoa. The lagging sector is usually manufacturing or agriculture.

A resource boom affects this economy in two ways:

1. In the "resource movement effect", the resource boom increases demand for labour, which causes production to shift toward the booming sector, away from the lagging sector. This shift in labour from the lagging sector to the booming sector is called direct deindustrialisation. However, this effect can be negligible, since e.g. the hydrocarbon and mineral sectors tend to employ few people.
2. The "spending effect" occurs as a result of the extra revenue brought in by the resource boom. It increases demand for labour in the non-tradable sector (services), at the expense of the lagging sector. This shift from the lagging sector to the non-tradable sector is called indirect deindustrialisation. The increased demand for non-traded goods increases their price. However, prices in the tradable sector are set internationally, so they cannot change. This amounts to an increase in the real exchange rate.

Within this framework, the spending effect is usually considered to be the main channel through which Dutch disease operates, while the resource-movement effect is usually seen as secondary. This is because, in the short run, labour is treated as the only mobile factor of production, and since the extractive sector is assumed to be capital-intensive, it employs relatively few workers. As a result, direct shifts of labour from manufacturing or agriculture into resource extraction are thought to be limited, and deindustrialisation is instead explained mainly by real exchange rate appreciation following a spending boom. Yet the extractive sector does not rely on labour alone. It makes heavy use of intermediate inputs such as fuel, electricity, water, and transportation, many of which cannot easily be imported and whose supply depends on other factors that are not perfectly mobile, including natural resources and capital. When resource extraction expands, it can therefore draw these inputs away from other tradable sectors, generating cost-push pressures when prices rise to clear the market. Moreover, because the production of these intermediate goods requires labour, the extractive sector also affects employment indirectly. Once these linkages are recognised, the resource-movement effect may be more significant than often assumed, even over the short run.

In a model of international trade based on resource endowments as the Heckscher–Ohlin(-Vanek), the Dutch disease can be explained by the Rybczynski theorem.

== Effects ==
Simple trade models suggest that a country should specialise in industries in which it has a comparative advantage; thus a country rich in some natural resources would be better off specialising in the extraction of those natural resources. However, other theories suggest that this can be detrimental, for example when the natural resources deplete. Also, prices may decrease, and competitive manufacturing cannot return as quickly as it left. This may happen because technological growth is smaller in the booming sector and the non-tradable sector than the non-booming tradable sector. Because that economy had smaller technological growth than did other countries, its comparative advantage in non-booming tradable goods will have shrunk, thus leading firms not to invest in the tradable sector.

Also, volatility in the price of natural resources, and thus the real exchange rate limits investment by private firms, because firms will not invest if they are not sure what the future economic conditions will be. Commodity exports such as raw materials drive up the value of the currency. This is what leads to the lack of competition in the other sectors of the economy. The extraction of natural resources is also extremely capital intensive, resulting in few new jobs being created.

== Minimisation ==
There are three basic ways to reduce the threat of Dutch disease: (1) slowing the appreciation of the real exchange rate, (2) boosting the competitiveness of the adversely affected sectors, and (3) demographic adaptation. One approach is to withhold the boom revenues, that is, not to bring all the revenues into the country all at once, and to save some of the revenues abroad in special funds and bring them in slowly. In developing countries, this can be politically difficult as there is often pressure to spend the boom revenues immediately to alleviate poverty, but this ignores broader macroeconomic implications.

Withholding will reduce the spending effect, alleviating some of the effects of inflation. Another benefit of letting the revenues into the country slowly is that it can give a country a stable revenue stream, improving the year-to-year certainty of revenues. Also, a country can provide for future generations by setting aside some of the boom revenues in a sovereign wealth fund. Examples of these include the Future Fund in Australia, Iranian national development fund, the Government Pension Fund of Norway, the Stabilisation Fund of the Russian Federation, the State Oil Fund of Azerbaijan, the Alberta Heritage Savings Trust Fund of Canada, the Future Generations Fund of Kuwait (1976), and the Permanent School Fund, Permanent University Fund and Alaska Permanent Fund of the United States. Recent talks led by the United Nations Development Programme in Cambodia – International Oil and Gas Conference on fuelling poverty reduction – point out the need for better education of state officials and energy CaDREs (Capacity Needs Diagnostics for Renewable Energies) linked to a sovereign wealth fund to avoid the resource curse (paradox of plenty).

Another strategy for avoiding real exchange rate appreciation is to increase saving in the economy in order to reduce large capital inflows which may appreciate the real exchange rate. This can be done if the country runs a budget surplus. A country can encourage individuals and firms to save more by reducing income and profit taxes. By increasing savings, a country can reduce the need for loans to finance government deficits and foreign direct investment.

Investments in education and infrastructure can increase the competitiveness of the lagging manufacturing or agriculture sector. Another approach is to protect the lagging sector by increasing subsidies or tariffs. However, this could worsen the effects of Dutch disease, as large inflows of foreign capital are usually provided by the export sector and bought up by the import sector. Imposing tariffs on imported goods will artificially reduce that sector's demand for foreign currency, leading to further appreciation of the real exchange rate.

== Diagnosis ==
It is usually difficult to be certain that a country has Dutch disease because it is difficult to prove the relationship between an increase in natural resource revenues, the real-exchange rate, and a decline in the lagging sector. An appreciation in the real exchange rate could be caused by other things such as productivity increases in the Balassa–Samuelson effect, changes in the terms of trade and large capital inflows. Often these capital inflows are caused by foreign direct investment or to finance a country's debt. However, evidence does exist suggesting that unexpected and very large oil and gas discoveries do cause the appreciation of the real exchange rate and the decline of the lagging sector across affected countries on average.

== Examples ==
- Gold and other wealth imported to Spain and Portugal during the 16th century from the Americas.
- Australian gold rush in the 19th century, first documented by Cairns in 1859.
- Kuwaiti oil from the 1960s to present.
- Indonesia's greatly increased export revenues after oil booms in 1974 and 1979.
- The effect of North Sea oil on manufacturing sectors in Norway and the United Kingdom in 1970–1990.
- Analysts have argued that the United Kingdom's increasing reliance on the financial sector since the 'Big Bang' in 1986 prevented manufacturing growth. A similar argument has been made regarding London's booming property market. Concentrated almost exclusively on the City of London, this financial sector growth has exacerbated regional economic differences such as the North–South divide despite the North's historically strong industrial and manufacturing base. Paul Krugman (among others) has written about the effect of a strong financial sector on UK manufacturing and a potential readjustment following Brexit, should the financial sector reduce its reliance on London.
- Nigeria and other post-colonial African states in the 1990s.
- Venezuelan oil for certain periods throughout its history. A notable case occurred during the first presidency of Carlos Andrés Pérez when he established Venezuela as a rentier state.
- Post-disaster booms accompanied by inflation following the provision of large amounts of relief and recovery assistance such as occurred in some places in Asia following the Asian tsunami in 2004.
- Canada's rising dollar due to foreign demand for natural resources, with the Athabasca oil sands becoming increasingly dominant, hampered its manufacturing sector from the early 2000s until the oil price crash in late 2014/early 2015.
- The Philippines' strong foreign exchange market inflows in the late 2000s leading to appreciation of currency and loss of competitiveness.
- Chilean mineral commodity prices in the 2000s.
- Australian mineral commodities in the 2000s and 2010s.
- Russian oil and natural gas in the 2000s and 2020s.
- Azerbaijani oil in the 2000s and 2020s.
- The San Francisco Bay Area's reliance on the high technology sector in the 21st century.
- Ransoms from Somali piracy.
- Nauru's heavy reliance on phosphate mining, combined with a lack of taxes and large government expenses, caused issues after the depletion of much of its reserves.
- Denmark's reliance in the 2020s on Novo's anti-obesity medications (GLP-1 receptor agonists) to drive all its economic growth.

== See also ==
- Balance of trade
- Beggar thy neighbour
- Gentrification
- Law of the handicap of a head start
- Norwegian paradox
- Price–specie flow mechanism
- Rasizade's algorithm
- Resource curse
- Tragedy of the commons
- Zero-sum game
