= Gisela Bleibtreu-Ehrenberg =

German sociologist (1929–2025)

Gisela Bleibtreu-Ehrenberg (2 August 1929 – 12 February 2025) was a German sociologist, ethnologist, sexologist, and writer further specialising into the fields of psychology, Indo-European studies, religious studies, and philosophy, since 1980 also increasingly anthropology. As Bleibtreu-Ehrenberg used these approaches in research particularly in the fields of sexology, homophobia, and prejudice studies, the US Society of Lesbian and Gay Anthropologists (SOLGA; formerly Anthropology Research Group on Homosexuality, ARGOH) of the American Anthropological Association ranked Bleibtreu-Ehrenberg's works on homophobia as internationally outstanding.

== Life and career ==
Bleibtreu-Ehrenberg studied sociology, psychology, ethnology, religious studies, philosophy and Indogermanistik (an interdisciplinarian German subject, not identical with purely linguistic Indo-European studies in Anglophone countries, consisting of historical, sociological, cultural, religious, ethnological, philological, and linguistic study relating to Proto-Indo-European and Indo-European peoples and Indo-European languages) in Bonn.

In 1969, Bleibtreu-Ehrenberg graduated at the University of Bonn, receiving her Magister artium (comparable to a Master's degree in the Anglo-American educational system) for her thesis Homosexualität und Transvestition im Schamanismus ("Homosexuality and transvestition in shamanism"). In 1970, she received her PhD for her doctoral dissertation on Sexuelle Abartigkeit im Urteil der abendländischen Religions-, Geistes-, und Rechtsgeschichte im Zusammenhang mit der Gesellschaftsentwicklung ("The religious, philosophical, and legal construction of sexual deviance in interdependence with the development of Western society").

After university studies Bleibtreu-Ehrenberg became a scientific assistant at the Sociological Institute of Bonn University, and worked as a sociologist, writer, and independent journalist, holding memberships in a number of scientific and political organizations. She was a leading member of German Society for Social-Scientific Sexuality Research. During the late 1980s, Bleibtreu-Ehrenberg was a member of the German-parliament commissioned Enquetekommission AIDS, an inquiry commission researching into the disease's social, legal, and public health care consequences and challenges, a cooperation which spawned her 1989 book Angst und Vorurteil (see below).

Bleibtreu-Ehrenberg was married and lived in Germany. She died on 12 February 2025, at the age of 95.

== Fields of interest and influences ==
=== "Ethno-sociologist" ===
A label commonly applied to Bleibtreu-Ehrenberg is that of an "ethno-sociologist", even though that is not to limit her approaches exclusively to non-Western cultures. Her inclusion of ethnological, cross-cultural approaches serves as one device of many that she uses to globally study and analyze mankind's nature and nurture as well as the differences and interdependencies between the two, aiming for a global perspective also applicable in modern industrialized societies.

=== Fields of interest ===
Following the ideology-critical and identity-critical approach of Frankfurt School's Critical Theory, the emphasis of Bleibtreu-Ehrenberg's mostly post-structural and deconstructionist work (see social constructionism and social constructivism) on socio-psychological prejudice studies lies on the socio-cultural, socio-historical, and socio-psychological research into issues such as Western repression of sensuality (Leibfeindlichkeit) in Indo-European cultures, and extends into research on topics such as deviant sexuality, homophobia, misogyny, gender roles, and patriarchy.

=== Deconstructivism and essentialism ===
Most of Bleibtreu-Ehrenberg's research is dedicated to cultural deconstruction of ethnocentric Western prejudices, analyzing their origins and later derivations in history, and emphasizes that this cultural nurture also determining social identities must not be misunderstood as man's essentialist human nature. According to Bleibtreu-Ehrenberg, positivist misinterpretation of ethnocentric prejudices as human nature is one of the key maladies of Western civilization, known to Critical Theory as society's totality also influencing much of Western scientific output. For instance, gays were throughout most of Western history said to be effeminate by their nature, while this common stereotype also influenced social identities and behaviors of individual homosexuals, and these resulting identities and behaviors were in turn taken by society as justifying evidence for their prejudice.

Only two of her works, Mannbarkeitsriten (1980) and Der pädophile Impuls (1985/88) deal with anthropological research into the essential cross-cultural and cross-species nature of two particular sexual attractions beyond common Western stereotypes, paederasty (which Bleibtreu-Ehrenberg defines as "male same-sex paedophilia") in Mannbarkeitsriten, and paedophilia (defined as "sexual contact between fertile adults and infertile juveniles" based upon preference for these activities on behalf of the adult side, rather than situational offences) in general in Der pädophile Impuls.

=== Influences ===
In her publications on prejudice studies, both general and specifically sexual deviance-related, Bleibtreu-Ehrenberg incorporates influences of Critical Theory (especially the theory of Authoritarian personality, also see Right-wing authoritarianism), Labeling theory by George Herbert Mead and Howard S. Becker, Social identity theory by Henri Tajfel and John Turner, Frustration-Aggression hypothesis by John Dollard and Neal E. Miller, Social learning theory by Albert Bandura, dispositif and discourse analysis by Michel Foucault, and the concept of derivation in the sociological sense of the term by Vilfredo Pareto, denoting an irrational, ideological after-the-fact rationalization. Other notable influences include Sigmund Freud, Mircea Eliade, Marija Gimbutas (though only acknowledged by Bleibtreu-Ehrenberg as a summary source for a century of scholarly Central European and Scandinavian Indogermanistik publications prior to Gimbutas), the concepts of magical thinking by James George Frazer and of the numinous by Rudolf Otto.

Bleibtreu-Ehrenberg's definition of prejudice is largely identical to Theodor W. Adorno's Verblendungszusammenhang, by which Adorno denotes socially constructed "delusions" (Verblendungen) based upon traditional socio-cultural and socio-psychological conditions or relations (Verhältnisse) within Western society, but also takes influence from Foucault's dispositif or apparatus, whereas according to Bleibtreu-Ehrenberg, traditional ethnocentric prejudices easily adapt to social paradigm shifts throughout history in order to update their rationalizations according to dominant epistemes, with new derivations of the same old prejudices as the result. For example, during the Medieval Age, according to Benedictus Levita, Thomas Aquinas, and the Malleus Maleficarum, same-sex activities were abhorred as the most deadliest sin of all, which was superbia, i. e. the very pride to consider oneself above God and disobey His will as manifested in His most sacred commandments such as that sodomia (see sodomy), the common Medieval term for these activities, was considered identical to satanism and evil witchcraft, whereas when with the Scientific Revolution of Early Modernity the responsibility of priests towards sinners increasingly transformed into one of doctors and judges toward those now considered criminally insane, the rationale to keep the ban upon the very same activities along with the ostracization of those who committed such unspeakable "abominations" changed to emphasizing the alleged counter-naturality or perversion of their acts and pathologizing those who desired such.

Combining her influences, Bleibtreu-Ehrenberg's synthesized definition of ethnocentric, inherently Authoritarian prejudice is one of socially learned manifest, recurring intrusive thoughts (Zwangsvorstellungen) that may spill over into Allport's Scale discrimination, including violent hate crimes, as a form of obsessive-compulsive behavior (Zwangshandlung; also see Obsessive-compulsive personality disorder). Due to what Bleibtreu-Ehrenberg terms "distorted perception" (verzerrte Wahrnehmung, resembling Bob Altemeyer's compartmentalized thinking) of constructed social reality, the prejudiced aggressor regards themselves as a rectifying, maybe curing agent, as an upholder of "natural order" and "society", and/or as protector of people they perceive as "victims" of the discriminated.

== Main works ==
=== Overview ===
Bleibtreu-Ehrenberg's main works consist of the following publications:

- 1978 (reprinted 1981): Tabu Homosexualität – Die Geschichte eines Vorurteils ("The taboo of homosexuality: The history of a prejudice"),
- 1980 (reprinted 1985): Mannbarkeitsriten: Zur institutionellen Päderastie bei Papuas und Melanesiern ("Rites of passage into manhood: On institutional paederasty in Papuas and Melanesians"),
- 1984: Der Weibmann – Kultischer Geschlechtswechsel im Schamanismus, eine Studie zur Transvestition und Transsexualität bei Naturvölkern ("Androgynous: Cultic sex change in shamanism, a study on transvestism and transsexualism in primitives"; enlarged version of Bleibtreu-Ehrenberg's 1969 MA thesis)
- 1985: Der pädophile Impuls – Wie lernt ein junger Mensch Sexualität? (published enlarged in English in 1988, reprint 1997, as The paedophile impulse: Toward the Development of an Aetiology of Child-Adult Sexual Contacts from an Ethological and Ethnological Viewpoint)
- 1986: Preface to the German edition Pädosexuelle Erlebnisse: Aus einer Untersuchung der Reichsuniversität Utrecht über Sexualität in pädophilen Beziehungen (published by the German family planning/sex ed organization Pro Familia) of the first preliminary report to Theo Sandfort's Dutch long-term research study published in English as The sexual aspect of paedosexual relations: The experiences of 25 boys with men (1981, English edition 1st reprint 1983, 2nd reprint 1987; further published update reports by Sandfort on the ongoing long-term study in 1987, 1992, 1994, 2000)
- 1989: Angst und Vorurteil – AIDS-Ängste als Gegenstand der Vorurteilsforschung ("Fear and prejudice: AIDS paranoia analyzed by the field of academic prejudice studies")
- 1990: Vom Schmetterling zur Doppelaxt – Die Umwertung von Weiblichkeit in unserer Kultur ("From butterfly to battle-axe: The degradation of the female in Western culture")

Of interest to Anglophone readers might also be Bleibtreu-Ehrenberg's English-language publications not mentioned above:

- 1987: New research into the Greek institution of pederasty, in: One-off Publication of the International Scientific Conference on Gay and Lesbian Studies "Homosexuality: Which Homosexuality?", Amsterdam.
- 1990: Pederasty among primitives: Institutionalized initiation and cultic prostitution, in: Journal of Homosexuality, no. 20. Reprinted in: Theo Sandfort, Edward Brongersma, Alex van Naerssen (eds.). Male intergenerational intimacy – Historical, socio-psychological, and legal perspectives, Harrington Park Press, New York and London. ISBN 0-918393-78-7

=== Tabu Homosexualität (1978) ===
Tabu Homosexualität is considered a foundational standard work in Germanophone research into homophobia, misogyny, patriarchy, general repression of sensuality and particularly repression of sexual deviance (Leibfeindlichkeit). In spite of not having been translated into any other language as of 2008, since its first publication Tabu Homosexualität remains treated and quoted as a standard source internationally as well. As of 2008, it is found in a number of Western European libraries, and in the US is even available in libraries in 13 different states.

According to Bleibtreu-Ehrenberg's socio-psychological, socio-historical interdisciplinary approach to the topic of homophobia, drawing from research fields such as cultural studies, religious studies, ethnology, philology, and linguistics, the ethnocentric prejudice towards particularly male same-sex attraction and activities in the history of Western, Indo-European cultures is intrinsically identical to misogyny, thus originally gave rise to, and until the modern age maintained, patriarchal structures of Indo-European society. Its roots and cultural elements can be traced back several millennia into Eurasian culture, and were originally based on the subsequent overlapping and conflict-ridden superimposition of the three basic ethnic and cultural strata (see stratification, social stratification, and archaeological horizon) underlying all modern Indo-European cultures.

From there, Bleibtreu-Ehrenberg traces the genesis of homophobia via a number of historical derivations in Indo-European societies until the 20th century.

=== Angst und Vorurteil (1989) ===
The book Angst und Vorurteil – AIDS-Ängste als Gegenstand der Vorurteilsforschung was based on the work of the parliamentary inquiry commission Enquetekommission AIDS, of which Bleibtreu-Ehrenberg was a member, that was formed in order to research into the disease's social, cultural, legal, and public health care consequences and challenges, as well as Bleibtreu-Ehrenberg's own final report brought forth in parliamentary hearings and towards the Helmut Kohl administration.

In Angst und Vorurteil, Bleibtreu-Ehrenberg on the one hand supplements the structural history of Western Leibfeindlichkeit (repression of sensuality) she related at a fuller scope in Tabu Homosexualität before, by pointing out in Angst und Vorurteil further aspects she had already brushed on in Der pädophile Impuls four years earlier.

On the other hand, in Angst und Vorurteil Bleibtreu-Ehrenberg gives a thorough, comprehensive description of post-WWII scientific prejudice studies, particularly regarding the re-inforcement of traditional Western Leibfeindlichkeit (prejudices directed against factual or putative sexual deviance) triggered by HIV, and chronicles the field's academic history from its roots. Bleibtreu-Ehrenberg's understanding of prejudice largely builds on Critical Theory and its concept of the Authoritarian personality, but also incorporates, among other schools of prejudice studies, Labeling theory, Social identity theory, Frustration-Aggression hypothesis, Social learning theory, and Foucault's dispositif and discourse analysis.

== Prizes and honors ==
- Rosa Courage Prize, Osnabrück, awarded by the board of the annual cultural LGBT event Gay in May

== Works in German ==
- Homosexualität und Transvestition im Schamanismus. in: Anthropos, no. 65
- Tabu Homosexualität – Die Geschichte eines Vorurteils. (1978)
- Der pädophile Impuls – Wie lernt ein junger Mensch Sexualität?. (1985/88)
- Vorwort zu der soziopsychologischen Studie Pädosexuelle Erlebnisse von Theo Sandfort. (1986)
- Angst und Vorurteil – AIDS-Ängste als Gegenstand der Vorurteilsforschung. (1989)
- Vom Schmetterling zur Doppelaxt – Die Umwertung von Weiblichkeit in unserer Kultur. (1990)
- Homosexualität bei Naturvölkern. in: Ernst Otto Arntz & Peter-Paul König (Ed.). Kirche und die Frage der Homosexualität. Verlagsgesellschaft Benno-Bernward-Morus mbH. Hildesheim. ISBN 3-89543-091-9
- Päderastie bei Naturvölkern. in: Frits Bernard (Ed.). Pädophilie ohne Grenzen – Theorie, Forschung, Praxis. Foerster Verlag. Frankfurt/Main. ISBN 3-922257-83-6
