= Bernard Slicher van Bath =

20th-century Dutch historian

- Born: Bernard Hendrik Slicher; 12 February 1910; Leeuwarden
- Died: September 27, 2004 (aged 94); Ede

Academic background
- Education: University of Amsterdam
- Thesis: Mensch en land in de Middeleeuwen. Bijdrage tot een geschiedenis der nederzettingen in oostelijk Nederland (1944)
- Doctoral advisor: Jan Romein

Academic work
- School or tradition: Annales school, new economic history
- Main interests: Social history, agrarian history
- Notable works: The Agrarian History of Western Europe, A.D. 500–1850

Notes
- Slicher is the surname. The appended van Bath refers to Slicher's title of ambachtsheer (lord) of Bath, inherited from his grandfather in 1933.

Bernard Hendrik Slicher, since 1933 calling himself Slicher van Bath (February 12, 1910 – September 27, 2004) was a Dutch social historian, best known internationally for his 1960 work The Agrarian History of Western Europe, AD 500–1850 and regarded as the initiator of quantitative social history in his native country.

Slicher commenced his studies in history at the Rijksuniversiteit Groningen in 1930 and moved to Utrecht in 1934 where he studied under the German medievalist Otto Oppermann. Having graduated in 1936, he took an assistant position with Oppermann, typing the professor's manuscripts and maintaining his library, which brought him into contact with the journal Annales d'histoire économique et sociale. Slicher van Bath then worked for some time as an archivist in Gelderland, being able to avoid conscription as a former sufferer of polio, and returned to Oppermann's service in 1941. Oppermann's research interests took an ever more ideological turn toward national socialism; when he suggested, in 1942, that Slicher should research the Dutch role in the Ostsiedlung, Slicher quit his job.

During the war time, Slicher van Bath pursued a doctorate degree, initially with Oppermann but soon with the Amsterdam-based historian Jan Romein, visiting Romein at his home and later at his hiding place. The thesis was finished in 1944, the doctorate degree awarded half a year after the end of World War II in November 1945.

Slicher van Bath finally settled in Wageningen, where he was appointed special professor (Note: Dutch: Bijzonder hoogleraar.) in agrarian history and formed what was termed the "Wageningen school" of quantitative history (a label that Slicher vehemently rejected, not wishing to be constrained by the methods of any particular "school"). At the request of the Cambridge Economic History of Europe's editorial board, Slicher van Bath wrote The agrarian history of Western Europe, AD 500–1850, his magnum opus (initially published in Dutch as De agrarische geschiedenis van West-Europa (500–1850), 1960). The book got him a guest professorship at the University of Chicago (1967–68), where Slicher van Bath became interested in the methods of the new economic history and shifted his attention to the history of Latin America. The history of this continent, rather than Annales-style regional studies of the Netherlands and Western Europe, would be his primary research topic until his 1975 retirement.
