= Mobile payments in India =

Payment using smart phones

Mobile payments is a mode of payment using mobile phones. Instead of using methods like cash, cheque, and credit card, a customer can use a mobile phone to transfer money or to pay for goods and services. A customer can transfer money or pay for goods and services by sending an SMS, using a Java application over GPRS, a WAP service, over IVR or other mobile communication technologies. In India, this service is bank-led. Customers wishing to avail themselves of this service will have to register with banks which provide this service. Currently, this service is being offered by several major banks and is expected to grow further. Mobile Payment Forum of India (MPFI) is the umbrella organisation which is responsible for deploying mobile payments in India.

India is the world's largest-growing mobile payments market. Mobile payment surpassed credit card transactions in 2021, clocking an annual value greater than $1 trillion.

== Background ==
India has a vast non-banking population, most of whom reside in the rural areas. The traditional banking industry can not cater to the needs of India's large rural populace. Setting up a conventional bank branch in a rural area would require considerable amounts of money to be spent on infrastructure and additional personnel. Most rural Indians are cut off from access to basic financial services, which include deposits and withdrawals from a trusted source.

=== Growth of mobile phones in India ===
Annual growth of mobile subscriber base in India

However, India is the second-largest telecommunications market and has 1100.37 million mobile phone customers. Estimated 812 million Indians used their mobile phones to access the internet. Mobile phones are quite common even in the remote villages. The mobile phone industry is growing at a rate of over 200 million per year. It was expected to touch the one and a half billion mark by 2015. The share of the urban subscribers is 66% and the share of the rural subscribers was 34%. In May 2011, the net monthly addition in terms of the number of subscriptions was 13.35 million. Of those, 7.33 million were from the urban segment and 6.02 million from the rural segment. The subscription growth rate on a monthly basis is 55% for urban segments and 45% for rural segments. Given this context, it is possible to consider the mobile phone as an economically viable instrument to enable inclusive access to financial services.

=== Impact of mobile phones on welfare ===
Mobile telephony has had an impact mainly by allowing for agents in information restricted areas to engage in more optimal arbitrage. The adoption of mobile phones by fishermen and wholesalers resulted in a dramatic reduction in price dispersion, the complete elimination of waste, and a near-perfect adherence to the law of one price. Both consumer and producer welfare increased.

Mobile payments can have a positive impact on welfare by easing operational aspects and associated costs of cash-based transactions related to cash handling, storage and transfer, and by providing a strong platform for financial inclusion.

== Immediate Payment Service (IMPS) ==
On November 22, 2010, NPCI launched Immediate Payment Services (IMPS) to offer an instant, 24-hour×7, interbank electronic fund transfer service through mobile phones. IMPS facilitate customers to use mobile instruments as a channel for accessing their bank accounts and put high interbank fund transfers in a secured manner with immediate confirmation features.

With over 900 million mobile subscriber and robust payment infrastructure, IMPS is well positioned to fulfill its objectives of enabling bank customers to use mobile instruments as a preferred channel for accessing their banks accounts, remit funds and also sub-serve the goal of electronification of retail payments. As of April 2023. there are 722 member banks which provide IMPS as a service.

The basic aim of IMPS is to also enable micropayments on low-end mobile devices which support only voice and text, in addition to higher-end phones which could support web browsing or Java application capabilities. A person who has subscribed to a mobile payment service should be able to send money to any other person who has subscribed as well. This should be independent of the mobile network and the bank to which either of the persons belong. This is referred to as interoperability and is a key concern for any major technology to be successful.

In India, the model for the delivery of IMPS will be bank-linked; which implies that customers wishing to avail themselves of this service should have:

- Initially, a registered mobile phone account with any network operator in the country, and
- A bank account
- Register for the mobile payment service with the bank

In contrast, in economies such as Kenya, the mobile network operators lead the development of mobile financial services. Choosing a bank-linked model enables offerings of a variety of value added financial service built on top of the basic mobile payment transaction. The idea of mobile financial solutions will only then permeate to all levels of society: customers, merchants, business houses and the government.

The technical standards are set up by MPFI, and are implemented by the various participating entities after being ratified by the RBI.

=== Key features ===
The key features of IMPS Funds Transfer are as follows:

- Instant funds transfer
- 24-hour, 365-day availability
- Credit and debit confirmations to sender and receiver
- Simple and easy to use
- Fast, inexpensive, safe and secure, accessible

Currently IMPS service is provided to the customers over various channels including SMS, Bank Mobile Application and USSD (*99#).

=== Transaction flow ===
The transaction flow for IMPS can be simply described as 'customer-bank-bank-customer'. When a customer initiates a transaction by sending an SMS to the bank's gateway, this SMS is processed by a mobile payment provider (MPP). The role of MPP is defined in the standards document. After appropriate checks with the customer's bank, the transaction is forwarded to a central switch. The role of the switching agency is played by the National Payments Corporation of India (NPCI). NPCI routes transaction to the payee's bank based on the MMID.

A transaction is initiated by sending the following details:

- Mobile number of the payee
- The seven-digit MMID of the payee
- The amount of money to be transferred
- The four-digit personal identification number (PIN) of the payer

Depending on the type of the transaction, either both parties (payer and payee) or only a single party is notified about the transaction. A successful transaction will be notified by an SMS to both parties.

The communication between the MPPs and the banks takes place using ISO 8583 message format, which is the standard message format for all financial messages in India. In order to test the compliance and conformance to the standards set and the message formats, a certification lab is being set up at IIT Madras.

=== MMID ===
The Mobile Money IDentifier (MMID) is the key identifying detail of a user participating in a transaction. An MMID is a seven-digit number given to a customer upon registration with a bank for the service. In the seven digits of the MMID are four digits used to identify the bank of the user and three digits used to identify the account of the user.

A mobile number and a MMID will uniquely identify a customer's account with the respective bank. The design of the MMID allows customers to operate multiple bank accounts linked to a single mobile number; each bank account has its own MMID. Additionally, since the MMID of the payee must be entered along with the payee's mobile phone number, it serves to reduce the possibility of an erroneous transaction when the payer inadvertently enters an incorrect mobile number.

The MMID is not intended to be a secret – it is simply an identifier and it does not give away any sensitive information about the customer. For example, a merchant will advertise his mobile number and MMID publicly in order to receive payments from the customers.

== Communication channels ==
The mobile payments service is available over a wide range of communication channels. The following communication channels are often used in combination to provide a complete end-to-end service:

- SMS
- WAP
- USSD
- IVR
- Phone-based application: J2ME/BREW
- ATM
- Internet

A user will use a particular set of communication channels depending on the capabilities of the mobile phone. The implementation of the standards will vary depending on the set used.

=== Application based ===
Most banks provide a Java application that can be downloaded on a Java-enabled phone which will guide the user through the money transfer process. An SMS sent through a Java application on the mobile device is as secure as an Internet banking transaction, since it can be encrypted between the user and the bank.

=== SMS and IVR ===
An SMS–IVR combination is used for transactions for mobile phones without Java capabilities. An SMS is sent to a phone number provided by the bank, and an IVR call-back is used for authentication and the transaction is carried forward as a voice-based transaction, at the end of which the user will be prompted to enter the MPIN. The SMS channel is used to send notification messages, while the IVR channel which is as secure as a GSM channel.

=== USSD ===
A transaction can also be initiated over USSD. A USSD session will provide the user with simple prompts over a menu allowing the user to input the payee's mobile number and MMID, and the user's own MMID and PIN for authentication.

=== Security ===
Every communication channel has its own set of security mechanisms. In addition, the RBI-issued guidelines on security of mobile payments require a two-factor authentication mechanism to be employed. A two-factor authentication in this context consists of:

- What you know: User PIN, MMID
- What you have: Mobile number, mobile phone, SIM card

No transaction can take place without the use of the secret PIN. The guidelines also specify a cap on the amount of money that can be sent during transactions.

== Use cases ==
Mobile payments enable a variety of possible uses, considering that the underlying architecture is interoperable and supports payments to other peers, merchants and government offices.

=== Pre-paid mobile top-up ===
Mobile top-up for prepaid mobile subscribers is one of the most common mobile-related financial transactions. This is made considerably easier, if the payment for topping up the mobile account can also be made over the mobile phone. There are already many online recharge options available and emerging, which point to the rapid growth in this business segment.

=== Domestic peer-to-peer remittances ===
Mobile payments can also be used to remit money. Migrant workers (from other states) in India need to transfer money to their kin in their native states. Using this service, transfer of money is safe, fast and effective as established by a pilot study conducted. This has potential to act as a very significant driver for adoption of mobile payment services in this demographic.

=== Bill and merchant payments ===
Bill payments provide convenience for the user and for utility companies. For payment to merchants, they offer another medium for the customer which vastly reduces cash management.

=== Governance ===
Mobile payments can have a large impact on interaction with government services and are being explored in India. Mobile payments are convenient to track and account for, key requirements in government payment transactions. Government to peer payments can also be made easier by using mobile payment channels and is being explored for schemes like NREGA.

=== New business opportunities ===
Mobile payments could also open the possibility for new business models, as now one would have the ability to pay and receive even small sums of money, almost instantaneously. A variety of value-added services based on mobile payment transactions are already entering the market.

== Adoption of mobile payments ==
There are various drivers that push the need and desire of mobile payments services in India, and there are several challenges which need to be addressed in order to ensure adoption of the technology in the Indian context. One of the key roles of The Mobile Payment Forum of India is to address these challenges that may inhibit the widespread use of mobile financial services. As per report from RedSeer Consulting, Indian market consist of 160 million unique mobile payment users till 2020 which will increase to 800 million by the year 2025 with transaction volume of Rs.7,092 trillion at a rate of 3.5 percent. Lower income groups will make smaller transactions with mobile wallets by 2025.

=== Drivers for mobile financial services ===
- High penetration of mobile subscribers.
- Mobile top-up services, domestic remittances and bill payments can be made very conveniently over a mobile phone.
- Growing demand, and an existing thriving ecosystem, for mobile services like ring tone downloads, Bollywood music, update for cricket matches, etcetera. Thus the uptake for another service, especially financial services, should be positive.
- Drive to be a part of the financial system for those people who currently do not have a bank account. The cost of cash handling, storage and transfer is very high in the informal sector. The ability to perform basic financial transactions over a mobile could act as a driver.
- There is a strong demographic dividend in India, where a large proportion of the population is very young. The young are often enthusiastic to take up new technologies and services.

=== Challenges for mobile financial services in India ===
- Poor levels of literacy are a problem, and voice-based services offer a potential solution. Voice-based solutions, especially in local languages, have two major benefits: they can work on all handsets and can be used by all irrespective of one's comfort level with technology or level of literacy.
- The mobile financial services have to be effective in terms of usability, cost, efficiency, interoperability and security for transactions of all ticket sizes.
- M-payments options should be available even on low end mobile handsets.

== Financial inclusion ==
The un-banked population can be classified into broad categories: those who do not open accounts due to lack of banking infrastructure, those who for various reasons (such as poverty and lack of valid identity papers) do not pass the required account opening criteria, and those who currently see no requirement to open an account. This process can be broken into three aspects: opening a bank account, managing the account, and having access to a set of financial services and products. To open an account, one has to satisfy the bank's KYC (Know Your Customer) norms. For the un-banked, providing a valid identity is a challenge. To that end, the Unique Identification Authority of India (UIDAI) has embarked on a mission to offer a single source of identity verification which can also be used to open bank accounts. Managing the account is something that mobile money solutions will make much easier, faster and cheaper, both for the customers and the banks. The key challenge is to determine if it is possible to devise demand driven financial products and services which make for a compelling reason to open an account. For example, a common need is a low value, low cost loan, for which the un-banked can typically offer no collateral. If this need can be addressed, via an appropriate business model, then managing that loan in terms of repayments is much easier over a mobile device. In this context, mobile payment solutions can certainly help by providing an effective channel for money transfer for both categories of the un-banked.

The issue of depositing money into a bank account where banks do not have a presence is addressed by the concept of banking correspondents.

=== Banking correspondent ===
Though mobile payments allow payments to be made electronically, they do not enable depositing money into a bank. The Reserve Bank of India (RBI) tended to this issue by creating the post of a banking correspondent (BC). The role of a BC is to act as an interface between the bank and its customers in places where traditional banking is not feasible. Banks can appoint a trusted third party as a BC in a village. All the villagers who wish to transact with the bank can get in touch with the BC. Deposit and withdrawal of money is handled by the BC. When a person deposits money at the BC, their account immediately gets credited. The person can then use their mobile phone for additional transactions.

== Differences with mobile banking ==
The major difference between mobile banking and mobile payments is the total absenteeism of the bank account number. In mobile banking or Internet banking, money can be transferred only when the account number of the payee is known before-hand. The account of the payee has to be registered with the payer and only then can a fund transfer happen.

In mobile payments, the account number is masked from being public. One need not know the account number of a person to transfer money. This opens up a range of possibilities from buying tickets to paying auto fare, both of which would not have been feasible had the account number been mandatory for a simple transaction.

== See also ==
- E-commerce payment system
- Payment services provider
- Mobile payments in other Global South countries:
  - Mobile payments in China
