= Jan Romein =

Dutch historian (1893–1962)

Jan Marius Romein
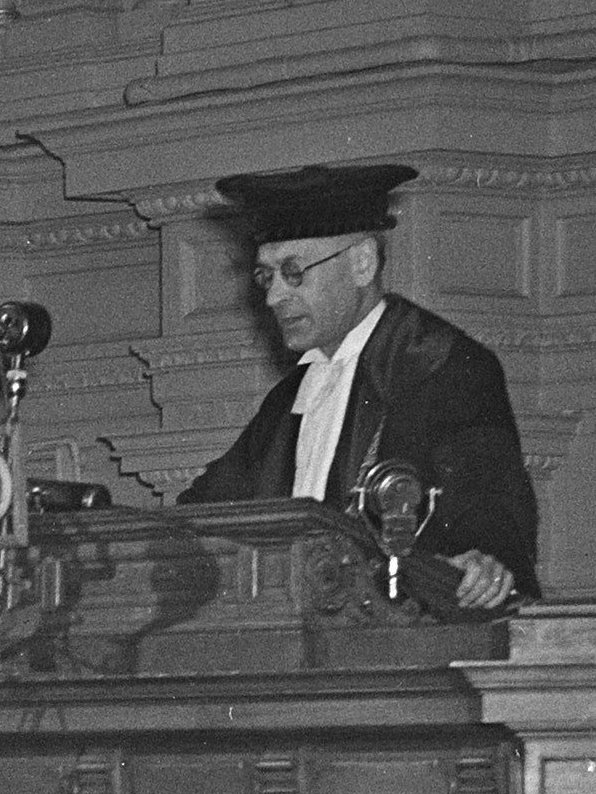
- Romein (Amsterdam, 1947)
- Born: 30 October 1893; Rotterdam
- Died: 16 July 1962 (aged 68); Amsterdam
- Spouse: Annie Romein-Verschoor (m. 1920)

Academic background
- Education: University of Leiden
- Thesis: Dostojewski in de Westersche Kritiek. Een hoofdstuk uit de geschiedenis van de literaire roem (1924)
- Doctoral advisor: Nicolaas van Wijk
- Influences: Johan Huizinga,, Arnold J. Toynbee

Academic work
- School or tradition: Marxist historiography
- Institutions: University of Amsterdam
- Doctoral students: Bernard Slicher van Bath
- Main interests: Cultural history, social history, literature
- Notable works: De Lage Landen bij de Zee, Erflaters van onze beschaving (both with Annie Romein-Verschoor), The Watershed of Two Eras. Europe in 1900.

Jan Marius Romein (30 October 1893 – 16 July 1962) was a Dutch historian, journalist, literary scholar and professor of history at the University of Amsterdam. A Marxist and a student of Huizinga, Romein is remembered for his popularizing books of Dutch national history, jointly authored with his wife Annie Romein-Verschoor. His work has been translated into English, German, French, Italian, Polish, Indonesian and Japanese.

== Biography ==
Born in Rotterdam, Romein married the writer and historian Annie Romein-Verschoor (1895–1978) on 14 August 1920.

Romein began writing while studying humanities at the University of Leiden (1914–1920). Of his professors the historian Johan Huizinga inspired him the most. During his studies and impressed by the First World War and the Russian Revolution he became interested in Marxism. He translated Franz Mehring's biography on Karl Marx into Dutch (1921; with an introductory essay). After a stay of seven months in Denmark, where Romein's friend and former fellow student Hans Kramers had become the assistant of the physicist Niels Bohr, the couple moved to Amsterdam in 1921. Romein became an editor of the daily De Tribune of the young Communistische Partij Holland (CPH, Communist Party of Holland). In addition, he worked as a freelance writer and translator. Already in 1916-1918 he published a Dutch translation of Romain Rolland's Jean Christophe (10 vols., with an introductory essay). In 1924 he received his doctoral degree, with the highest distinction, at the University of Leiden with the dissertation Dostoyevsky in the Eyes of Western Critics. In 1927 he left the communist party, but he remained interested in Marxism and in the political development of the Soviet Union and of Asia. After publishing a book on the history of the Eastern Roman Empire (Byzantium, 1928) he translated and edited the Harmsworth's Universal History of the World into Dutch, in co-operation with other historians (1929–1932, 9 vols.), with three added chapters written by himself. His first book publication in the field of Dutch history was a pioneering study on the history of Dutch historical writing during the Middle Ages (1932). His most famous books include a history of The Low Countries (1934) and a four-volume work with 36 short biographies of important Dutch (1938–1940), both in cooperation with his wife and fellow historian Annie Romein-Verschoor. In 1939, Romein was appointed professor of history at the University of Amsterdam. He survived World War II after being held hostage as a prisoner for three months by the German police in the notorious Amersfoort police detention camp, and returned to writing and teaching. In 2011 Jan Romein and his wife were posthumously awarded the title "Righteous among the Nations" by Yad Vashem in Jerusalem, for offering a hiding place to two persecuted Jewish fellow-citizens during the German occupation.

In 1937, he published an essay on technology called "The dialectics of progress" (in Dutch: "De dialectiek van de vooruitgang") in which he describes a phenomenon called the "Law of the handicap of a head start" ("Wet van de remmende voorsprong"), as part of the series "The unfinished past" (in Dutch: "Het onvoltooid verleden"). This article was also published in German as "Dialektik des Fortschritts" in: Mass und Wert. Zweimonatsschrift für freie deutsche Kultur (eds. Thomas Mann and Konrad Falke), vol. 2 (Zurich, Switzerland, 1939).

In 1946, Annie Romein received a copy of Anne Frank's diary which she tried to have published. When she was unsuccessful, she gave the diary to her husband, who wrote the first article about the diary and its writer, for the newspaper Het Parool. Interest raised by his article led to the diary being published the following year. Romein was interested in the (auto)biographical approach to history. During the years of German occupation he wrote a book on this, which was published in 1946 (German translation 1948) and is still regarded as an informative and original contribution to the historiography of the genre. Also in 1946, he introduced the theory of history as a subject in the academic curriculum. Soon after the beginning of the Cold War his marxist conceptions, though undogmatic, had placed him in relative isolation, and in 1949 he was denied entry to the United States for an intended speaking engagement at an international scholarly conference in Princeton of which he was one of the initiators. Instead, he was welcomed as a guest professor in the young republic of Indonesia during the 1951–1952 academic year.

He devoted the latter part of his life to writing a history of Europe during the 25-year period from 1889 to 1914: The Watershed of Two Eras. Europe in 1900, which was published posthumously in 1967 (English edition 1978). According to various reviewers it "is a highly successful attempt at writing an analysis and synthesis of European history between the years 1890 and the outbreak of the First World War", the decades during which Europe's supremacy in the world started waning. "This is one of the best books of its kind of integrated history. (...) Romein has successfully integrated the various branches of history - economic, cultural and political - without being stilted. (...) This work can be read with great profit by the highly educated general reader, the undergraduate history major, the advanced graduate student, and the professional historian." The book devotes chapters to all aspects of European history during this period: not only economic, social, cultural and political history, but also the developments in science, medicine, law and criminology, psychology, literature, art, women emancipation, religion and atheism, education etc. The American Historical Review concluded: "the book is a treasury of illuminating fact and perceptive commentary."

Due to a chronic illness, which became manifest in 1959, he limited his professorship at the University of Amsterdam to solely Theoretical History. He died in Amsterdam in July 1962.

== Political views ==
Romein held Marxist views and was active within the Communist Party of Holland (CPH) from 1917 onwards, initially as a secretary for the historian and communist member of parliament Willem van Ravesteyn, then as a high-ranking editor of the party's daily De Tribune. When internal struggles led to a Moscow-backed "palace revolution" in 1925, Romein sided with Van Ravesteyn and David Wijnkoop, and as a result was forced out of the Tribune's editorial board. Expulsion from the party for continued support of Wijnkoop followed in 1927, ending Romein's direct involvement in politics.

Romein's Marxism made him a controversial figure and affected his career when in 1938 he was a candidate for a professorship at the Municipal University of Amsterdam, where professors were appointed by the municipal council. On the one hand, the liberals and right-wing factions disliked Romein for his continued support of the Soviet Union; on the other hand, the communist faction headed by Romein's old friend Wijnkoop were upset about his openly criticizing of Soviet show trials, two years earlier. This criticism, however, won him some sympathy within SDAP faction. A majority that included Wijnkoop's communists voted against Romein's appointment. A year later, when a different professorship was vacant, Romein was appointed professor of Dutch history, this time with support from Wijnkoop and despite a vehement campaign against his candidature.

In the Cold War years of the early 1950s, Romein and his collaborators became relatively isolated. He condemned the Soviet crackdown on the 1956 Hungarian uprising, in a pamphlet that simultaneously denounced the French and British involvement in Egypt during the Suez Crisis.

== Main works ==
In English:

- "Theoretical History", in: Journal of the History of Ideas, vol. 9, 1948, no. 1, pp. 53–64.
- A World on the Move; a history of colonialism and nationalism in Asia and North Africa from the turn of the century to the Bandung Conference (compiled following an outline of events and dates prepared by J.M. Romein and W.F. Wertheim, who also have written the introductory chapters; captions and running text by H.M. van Randwijk. Transl. from the Dutch by James S. Holmes and A. van Marle), 1956.
- "The Common Human Pattern; the origin and scope of historical theories", in: Delta, review of arts, life and thought in the Netherlands, Summer 1959, pp. 5–20.
- The Asian Century: A History of Modern Nationalism in Asia (with Jan Erik Romein, transl. by R.T. Clark, with a foreword by K.M. Panikkar), 1962. German edition 1958, Indonesian ed. 1958, Japanese ed. 1961; Italian ed. 1969.
- "Change and Continuity in History: The Problem of the 'turnover'," in: Delta, review of arts, life and thought in the Netherlands, Spring 1963, pp. 27–40.
- "The Significance of the Comparative Approach in Asian Historiography. The National and Social Revolution in Asia and the Time Factor", in: An Introduction to Indonesian Historiography. Eds. Soedjatmoko, Mohammed Ali, G.J. Resink, George McT. Kahin, 1965 (3rd ed. 1975), pp. 380–394.
- History of Mankind: Culture and Scientific Development, Volume VI: The Twentieth Century (part of a UNESCO-project). Authors/editors: Caroline F. Ware, K. M. Panikkar, and Jan M. Romein, 1966.
- The Watershed of Two Eras. Europe in 1900 (transl. Arnold J. Pomerans. With a biographical and bibliographical introduction by Harry J. Marks, a foreword by Annie Romein-Verschoor, and a preface by Maarten C. Brands), 1978 (first paperback ed. 1982).

Books in Dutch, German, Italian, Polish and Bahasa:

- Dostojewskij in de Westersche critiek. Een hoofdstuk uit de geschiedenis van den literairen roem [Dostoyevsky in the Eyes of Western Critics. A chapter from the history of literary fame], 1924 (doctoral dissertation, cum laude, University of Leiden).
- Byzantium. Geschiedkundig overzicht van staat en beschaving in het Oost-Romeinsche Rijk [Byzantium. Historical survey of state and civilisation in the Eastern Roman Empire], 1928.
- Geschiedenis van de Noord-Nederlandsche geschiedschrijving in de Middeleeuwen; Bijdrage tot de beschavingsgeschiedenis [History of the Northern-Dutch Historiography during the Middle Ages. A contribution to civilisation history], 1932.
- De Lage Landen bij de zee. Geïllustreerde geschiedenis van het Nederlandse volk van Duinkerken tot Delfzijl [The Low Lands by the Sea. An illustrated history of the Dutch people from Dunkirk to Delfzyl], 1934 (8th, rev. & augm. ed. 1979).
- Het onvoltooid verleden [The Unfinished Past. Essays], 1937 (2nd, augm. ed. 1948).
- Erflaters van onze beschaving. Nederlandse gestalten uit zes eeuwen (with Annie Verschoor), 4 vols. [Legators of our Civilization. Dutch Figures from Six Centuries], 1938–1940 (13th ed., in one vol., illustr. 1979). Abridged German edition (transl. U. Huber-Noodt): Ahnherren der holländischen Kultur. Vierzehn Lebensbilder mit 13 Porträts, 1946 (2nd ed. 1961).
- De biografie, een inleiding [The Biography; an introduction], 1946 (2nd ed. 1951). German edition (transl. U. Huber-Noodt): Die Biographie; Einführung in ihre Geschichte und ihre Problematik, 1948.
- Theoretische Geschiedenis [Theoretical History], 1946. Eng. ed.: Theoretical History, in: Journal of the History of Ideas, vol. 9, 1948, pp. 53–64. German ed.: Theoretische Geschichte. In: Schweizer Beiträge zur Allgemeinen Geschichte, Bern, vol. 5, 1947, pp. 5–27.
- Apparaat voor de studie der geschiedenis [Apparatus for the study of history], 1949 (9th rev. & augm. ed. 1979).
- In de Hof der Historie. Kleine encyclopaedie der theoretische geschiedenis [In the Court of History. A Short Encyclopedia of Theoretical History], 1951 (2nd ed. 1963).
- 1. Kebangunan Asia. – 2. Pengertian kerdja di Timur dan Barat, 1953.
- Asia bergolak, setengah abad sedjarah Asia dalam lebih dari 600 gambar 1900 sampai sekarang, oleh J.M. Romein dan W.F. Wertheim; teks-teks penghubung oleh H.M. van Randwijk, dan terdjemahan oleh Amal Hamzah, 1954.
- Aera Asia. Terdjadinja, perkembangan dan kemenangan Nasionalisme di Asia dalam abad ke-20. Diselenggarakan bersama-sama dengan J.E. Romein; dan terdjemahan oleh Nur Tugiman (Indonesian translation of The Asian Century), 1958.
- Das Jahrhundert Asiens, Geschichte des modernen asiatischen Nationalismus; in Zusammenarbeit mit J.E. Romein, übersetzt von H. Jolenberg, 1958.
- Over integrale geschiedschrijving [On the writing of Integral History], 1958.
- Op het breukvlak van twee eeuwen [On the Watershed of Two Centuries], 2 vols., 1967 (2nd ed., in one vol., with sub-title: De westerse wereld rond 1900 [The Western World around 1900]. Illustr. 1976); Eng. transl. 1978, first paperback edition 1982.
- Il secolo dell'Asia. Imperialismo occidentale e rivoluzione asiatica nel secolo XX. Prefaz.di Ernesto Ragionieri. Torino: Einaudi, 1969 (Italian translation of The Asian Century).
- Twórcy kultury holenderskiej [Makers of the Dutch culture]. Polish translation by Jerzy Hummel of Erflaters van onze beschaving. Warszawa: Państwowy Instytut Wydawniczy (Warsaw: State Institute for Publishers), 1973; 308 p.
- Historische lijnen en patronen. Een keuze uit de essays [Historical headlines and patterns. Selected Essays], 1971 (with a preface by Maarten C. Brands; 2nd ed. 1976).
