= Theo Sandfort =

Dutch researcher

- Title: Associate professor
- Awards: John Money Award (2008; SSSS)

Academic background
- Education: Utrecht University

Academic work
- Discipline: Social psychology

Theo Sandfort is a Dutch professor, author and former president of the International Academy of Sex Research. He served as professor and postdoctoral training director at Columbia University and was designated a fellow status by the American Psychological Association.

== Career ==
=== 2020 foster care research ===
In 2015, Sandfort was commissioned by the New York City Administration for Children's Services (ACS) to develop a landmark study about the state of the LGBT youth who were under care of the New York City foster care system. The study, in which Sandfort was the lead researcher, was conducted in 2019 and published in 2020. It found that about 8,000 foster youth in the city were LGBT, and that that population generally reported lower well-being metrics, which Sandfort said were similar to the lower well-being already observed among LGBT youth in general, although those metrics seemed to have been influenced by the unique negative experiences that the LGBT youth usually suffers while under foster care.

The results of the study were covered by the New York Times and The Imprint. After Sandfort's previous studies of pedophilia between 1979 and the 1990s resurfaced, the ACS cut ties with him.

== Books ==
=== The sexual aspects of Paedophile Relations ===
The Sexual Aspects of Paedophile Relations: The Experience of Twenty-Five Boys (1982) is a book written by Sandfort and published, originally in Dutch, by Amsterdam-based publisher Pan. The book studies a sample, which Sandfort described as non-generalizable, of twenty-five males aged 16 or younger who did not report negative effects from being in relationships with adults.

American sociologist David Finkelhor stated that, although Sandfort's findings were probably replicable, they ran against more representative samples in which only a minority of Americans who experienced sexual contact with adults while they were minors expressed positive reactions. He said that Sandfort did not obtain, as he never professed to, a representative sample. Finkelhor further stated that boys tend to react less negative to sexual contact with adults than girls, and that some positive reactions to such events have been observed to erode over time.

David Mrazek said that Sandfort's study presented in The Sexual Aspects of Paedophile Relations suffered from sample bias. He stated that, although Sandfort stated that the findings were not generalizable, he still sought to generalize the results.

=== Boys on their Contact with Men ===
Boys on their Contact with Men: A Study of Sexually Expressed Frienships (1987) is a book written by Sandfort following his publication of The Sexual Aspects of Paedophile Relations and the reactions thereto. It is introduced by John Money and was published by Global Academic Publishers.

=== Male Intergenerational Intimacy ===
Male Intergenerational Intimacy: Historical, Sociopsychological and Legal Perspectives (1991) is a book by Sandfort that compiles 16 research articles and three commentaries on homosexual intergenerational relationships.

==== Reception ====
Researcher Gary Klein said that the title of Male Intergenerational Intimacy was confounding, since the book did not examine relationships between adult men of different generations. He criticized the book's lack of an index and said that the book lived up to its subtitle, as, he stated, it did provide a multifaceted analysis of pedophilia. Klein stated that, for all but one article, "each contributor provided a comprehensive set of research notes which would be of immense help to anyone doing extensive research on pedophilia".
