= Max Corden =

Australian economist (1927–2023)

Professor W. Max Corden AC
- Born: 13 August 1927; Breslau, Lower Silesia, Prussia, Germany
- Died: 21 October 2023 (aged 96); Melbourne, Victoria, Australia
- Occupation: Economist
- Spouse: Dorothy Corden (dec.)
- Children: Jane Corden (dec.)
- Website: http://www.maxcorden.com/

Warner Max Corden AC (13 August 1927 – 21 October 2023) was an Australian economist. He was mostly known for his work on the theory of trade protection, including the development of the Dutch disease model of international trade. He was also active in the fields of international monetary systems, macroeconomic policies of developing countries and Australian economics. Corden, originally German, emigrated from Nazi Germany to Melbourne in 1939. Corden died on 21 October 2023, at the age of 96.

== Academic career ==
After completing high school at the academically reputed Melbourne High School, Corden graduated from the University of Melbourne in 1950 and obtained his PhD in economics at the London School of Economics (1956). He was subsequently Nuffield Reader in International Economics and Fellow of Nuffield College at Oxford University, and from 1977 to 1988 he was Professor of Economics at the Australian National University. Furthermore, he was senior advisor in the Research Department of the International Monetary Fund from 1986 until 1988.

He then became professor and, later on, Chung Ju Yung Distinguished Professor of International Economics at the School of Advanced International Studies (SAIS), Johns Hopkins University until he retired in late 2002. He then served as emeritus professor of international economics at SAIS and a professorial fellow in the Department of Economics of the University of Melbourne.

Max Corden maintained a personal website including autobiographical essays and copies of recent publications.

== Major publications ==
- The Theory of Protection (1971)
- Trade Policy and Economic Welfare (1974, 1997)
- Inflation, Exchange Rates, and the World Economy (1977, 1985)
- Protection, Trade and Growth (1985)
- International Trade Theory and Policy'. Aldershot, Hants, England; Brookfield, Vermont, USA: Edward Elgar. 1992 – via Internet Archive.
- Economic Policy, Exchange Rates, and the International System (1994)
- The Road to Reform (1997)
- Too Sensational: On the Choice of Exchange Rate Regimes (2002)
- Lucky Boy in the Lucky Country [autobiography] (2017), Cham, Switzerland: Palgrave Macmillan.

== Honours ==
- Honorary Foreign Member of the American Economic Association.
- Fellow of the Academy of the Social Sciences in Australia (1977-).
- Bernhard Harms Prize for International Economics of the Kiel Institute for the World Economy, 1986.
- President of the Economic Society of Australia from 1977 to 1980.
- Patron of the Economic Society of Australia (Victoria) 2016 -
- Member of the Group of Thirty, from 1982 to 1990.
- Doctorate of Commerce (honoris causa) by the University of Melbourne, 1995.
- Distinguished Fellow of the Economic Society of Australia, 1995.
- Fellow of the British Academy since 1997.
- Companion of the Order of Australia (AC), 2001 Australia Day Honours, for service as an international economist, particularly in the area of trade and finance policy development.
