= Antilocution =

Prejudicial remarks to others about a person or group

Antilocution describes a form of prejudice in which negative verbal remarks against a person, group, or community, are made but not addressed directly to the subject.

== History ==
American psychologist Gordon Allport coined this term in his 1954 book, The Nature of Prejudice. Antilocution is the first point on Allport's Scale, which can be used to measure the degree of bias or prejudice in a society. Allport's stages of prejudice are antilocution, avoidance, discrimination, physical attack, and extermination.

Antilocution is a compound noun consisting of the word 'locution' and prefix 'anti' which expresses locution's antithesis.

== Description ==
Allport considered antilocution to be the least aggressive form of prejudice. It can nevertheless be destructive and life-changing for its object/target. Those who employ antilocution may neither know what they are doing nor consider themselves committing a prejudicial act. A subject may feel the need to join in if the antilocution is employed by the majority. This can either bind the subject to the group and/or spread biased information that engenders discriminatory behaviors toward the object.

Antilocution is similar to 'talking behind someone's back,' though antilocution may result in an in-group ostracizing an out-group on a biased basis.

"Antilocution" is used less often than "hate speech", which has a similar but more aggressive meaning and which places no regard on the fact that the out-group is unaware of the discrimination.

== Causes, employment, and danger ==
Individuals may engage in prejudicial conversation when they feel threatened. Such conversations may be based on misperceptions and by the subject. For example, a group may apply stereotypes to a new, unknown member. Such individuals may deny that their behavior is prejudicial, and is instead a matter of expressing opinions. Antilocution can lead to widespread discrimination toward the object as the subject(s) do not feel that they are transgressing. Facts are needed to dispel such stereotypes and create a positive disposition toward the object.

== See also ==
- Allport's Scale
