= Hateful Run =

Stream in Pocahontas County, West Virginia, U.S.

Coordinates: 38°21′04″N 80°15′28″W

Location
- Country: United States
- State: West Virginia
- County: Pocahontas County

Hateful Run is a stream in Pocahontas County, West Virginia, in the United States.

The stream most likely was named by a local surveyor. Hateful Run has been noted for its unusual place name.

== See also ==
- List of rivers of West Virginia
