= Hatred =

Intense feeling of contempt or dislike

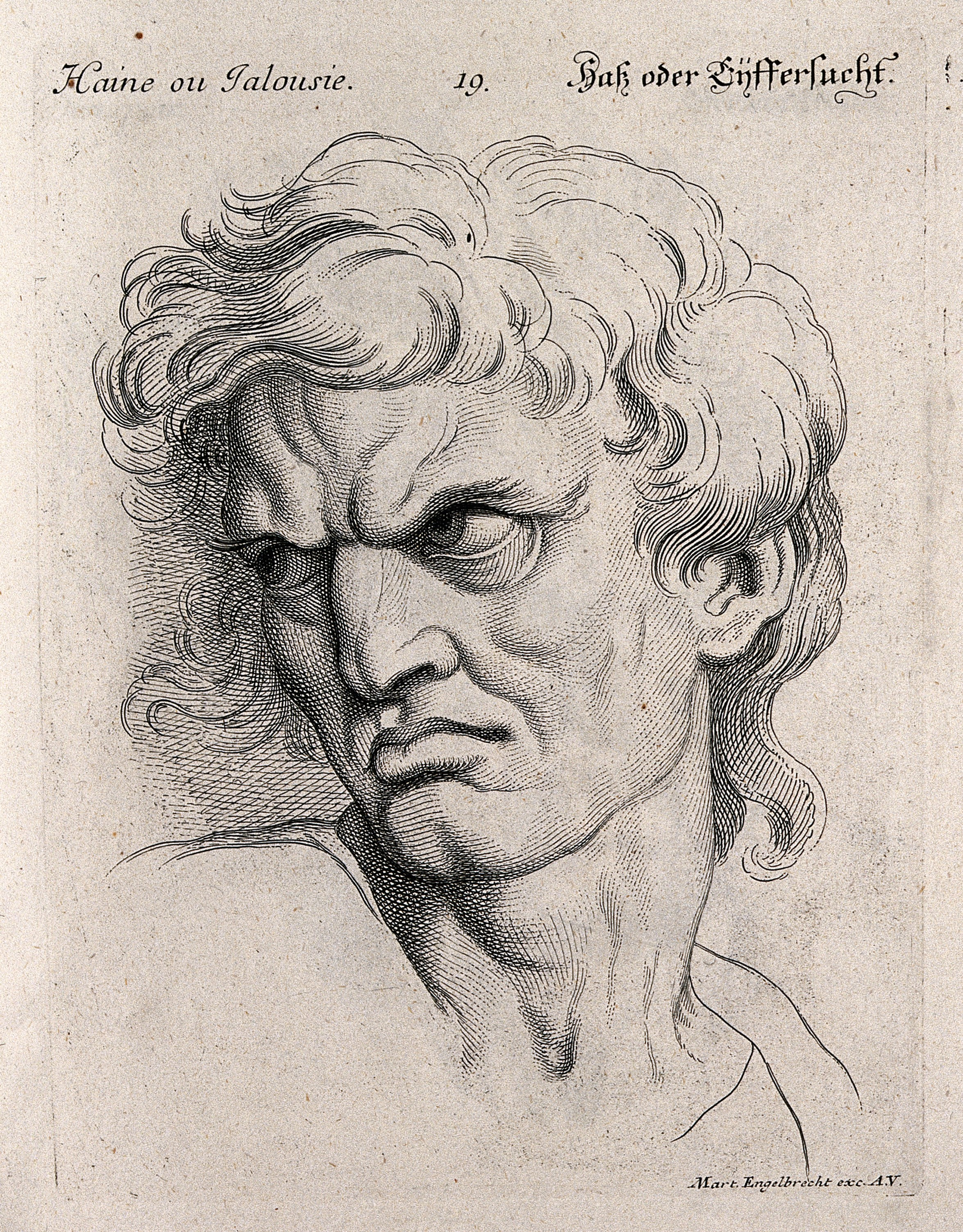
A man glowering, expressing hatred or jealousy.

Hatred or hate is an intense negative emotional response towards certain people, things or ideas, usually related to opposition or revulsion towards something. Hatred is often associated with intense feelings of anger, contempt, and disgust. Hatred is seen as the opposite of love.

A number of different definitions and perspectives on hatred have been put forth. Philosophers have been concerned with understanding the essence and nature of hatred, while some religions view it positively and encourage hatred toward certain outgroups. Social and psychological theorists have understood hatred in a utilitarian sense. Certain public displays of hatred are sometimes legally proscribed in the context of pluralistic cultures that value tolerance.

Hatred may encompass a wide range of gradations of emotion and have very different expressions depending on the cultural context and the situation that triggers the emotional or intellectual response. Based on the context in which hatred occurs, it may be viewed favorably, unfavorably, or neutrally by different societies.

== Emotion ==
As an emotion, hatred can be short-lived or long-lasting. It can be of low intensity – "I hate broccoli" – or high intensity: "I hate the whole world". In some cases, hatred can be a learned response from external influences, such as from being abused, misled, or manipulated. As a general rule, hatred is the deep psychological response to feeling trapped or being unable to understand certain sociological phenomena. Robert Sternberg saw three main elements in hatred:

1. a negation of intimacy, by creating distance when closeness had become threatening;
2. an infusion of passion, such as fear or anger;
3. a decision to devalue a previously valued object.

The important self-protective function, to be found in hatred, can be illustrated by Steinberg's analysis of 'mutinous' hatred, whereby a dependent relationship is repudiated in a quest for autonomy.

== Psychoanalysis ==
Sigmund Freud defined hate as an ego state that wishes to destroy the source of its unhappiness, stressing that it was linked to the question of self-preservation. Donald Winnicott highlighted the developmental step involved in hatred, with its recognition of an outside object: "As compared to magical destruction, aggressive ideas and behavior take on a positive value, and hate becomes a sign of civilization".

In his wake, object relations theory has emphasized the importance of recognizing hate in the analytic setting: the analyst acknowledges his own hate (as revealed in the strict time-limits and the fee charged), which in turn may make it possible for the patient to acknowledge and contain their previously concealed hate for the analyst.

Adam Phillips went so far as to suggest that true kindness is impossible in a relationship without hating and being hated, so that an unsentimental acknowledgement of interpersonal frustrations and their associated hostilities can allow real fellow-feelings to emerge.

== Legalities ==
In legal jargon, a hate crime (also known as a "bias-motivated crime") is a criminal act which may or may not be motivated by hate. Those who commit hate crimes target victims because of their perceived membership in a certain social group, usually defined by race, gender, religion, sexual orientation, mental disorder, disability, class, ethnicity, nationality, age, gender identity, or political affiliation. Incidents may involve physical assault, destruction of property, bullying, harassment, verbal abuse or insults, or offensive graffiti or letters (hate mail).

Hate speech is perceived to disparage a person or group of people based on their social or ethnic group, such as race, sex, age, ethnicity, nationality, religion, sexual orientation, gender identity, mental disorder, disability, language ability, ideology, social class, occupation, appearance (height, weight, skin color, etc.), mental capacity, and any other distinction that might be considered a liability. The term covers written as well as oral communication and some forms of behaviors in a public setting. It is also sometimes called antilocution and is the first point on Allport's scale which measures prejudice in a society. In many countries, deliberate use of hate speech is a criminal offence prohibited under incitement to hatred legislation. It is often alleged that the criminalization of hate speech is sometimes used to discourage legitimate discussion of negative aspects of voluntary behavior (such as political persuasion, religious adherence and philosophical allegiance). There is also some question as to whether or not hate speech falls under the protection of freedom of speech in some countries.

Both of these classifications have sparked debate, with counter-arguments such as, but not limited to, a difficulty in distinguishing motive and intent for crimes, as well as philosophical debate on the validity of valuing targeted hatred as a greater crime than general misanthropy and contempt for humanity being a potentially equal crime in and of itself.

== Neurology ==
The neural correlates of hate have been investigated with an fMRI procedure. In this experiment, people had their brains scanned while viewing pictures of people they hated. The results showed increased activity in the middle frontal gyrus, right putamen, bilaterally in the premotor cortex, in the frontal pole, and bilaterally in the medial insular cortex of the human brain.

Those suffering from misophonia have been known to express hatred when triggered.

== Ethnolinguistics ==
Hate, like love, takes different shapes and forms in different languages. While it may be fair to say that one single emotion exists in English, French (haine), and German (Hass), hate is historically situated and culturally constructed: it varies in the forms in which it is manifested. Thus a certain relationless hatred is expressed in the French expression J'ai la haine, which has no precise equivalent in English; while for English-speakers, loving and hating invariably involve a force, an object, or a person, and therefore, a relationship with something or someone, J'ai la haine (literally, I have hate) precludes the idea of an emotion directed at a person. This is a form of frustration, apathy and animosity which churns within the subject but establishes no relationship with the world, other than an aimless desire for destruction.

French forms of anti-Americanism have been seen as a specific form of cultural resentment, registering joy-in-hate.

== Religion ==
A United Nations Special Rapporteur on freedom and religion cited the concept of collective hatred based on religion, which he described as a man-made phenomenon caused by deliberate actions and omissions of hate-mongers.

Hatred can also be sanctioned by religion. The Hebrew word describing the psalmist's "perfect hatred" (Ps. 139.22) means that it "brings a process to completion". Religion can employ extreme speech in an attempt to convert new adherents and that extreme speech made against other religions or their adherents can result in situations of religious hatred.

== Philosophy ==
Philosophers from the ancient time sought to describe hatred and today, there are different definitions available. Aristotle, for instance, viewed it as distinct from anger and rage, describing hate as a desire to annihilate an object and is incurable by time. David Hume also offered his own conceptualization, maintaining that hatred is an irreducible feeling that is not definable at all.

== See also ==
- Discrimination
- Duluth lynchings
- Forgiveness
- Gossip
- Misanthropy
- Moral emotions
- Nineteen Eighty-Four
- Resentment
- Revenge
- Self-compassion
- Self-loathing
- Two Minutes Hate
- Zelyonka attack
