= The Haters (film) =

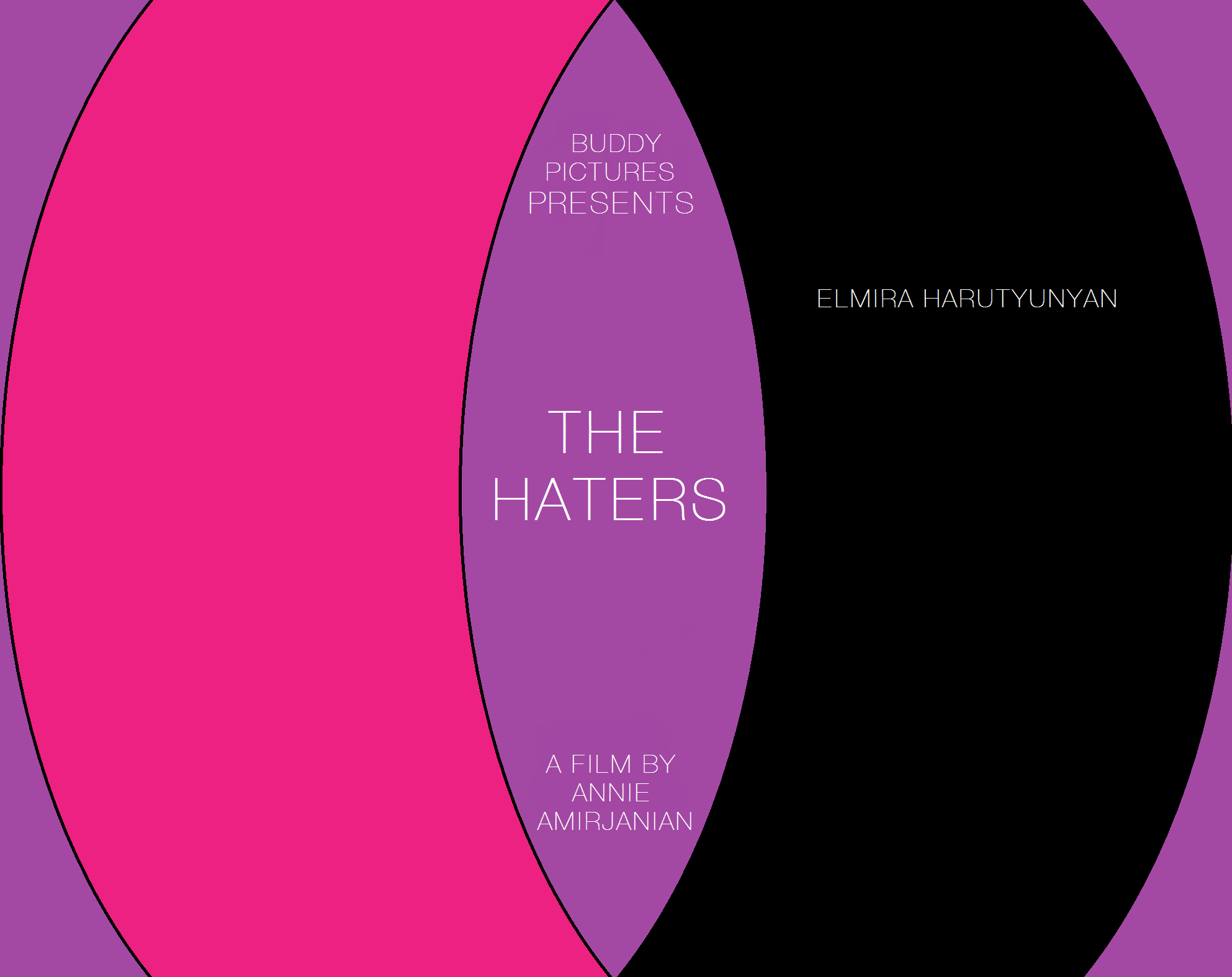
- The Haters Poster
- Directed by: Annie Amirjanian
- Written by: Annie Amirjanian, Elmira Harutyunyan
- Produced by: Annie Amirjanian, Elmira Harutyunyan
- Starring: Elmira Harutyunyan, Mary Stepanyan, Marianna Mkhchyan
- Cinematography: Annie Amirjanian, Elmira Harutyunyan
- Edited by: Annie Amirjanian, Elmira Harutyunyan
- Production company: Buddy Pictures
- Distributed by: Buddy Pictures
- Release date: August 1, 2015
- Running time: 40 minutes
- Country: Armenia
- Language: English

The Haters is a 2015 Armenian teen comedy-drama film directed by Annie Amirjanian and produced by Buddy Pictures. It will star Elmira Harutyunyan, Mary Stepanyan and Marianna Mkhchyan. The film is written by Annie Amirjanian and Elmira Harutyunyan. It is set to be released on August 1, 2015 by Buddy Pictures. Annie Amirjanian and Elmira Harutyunyan are the co-authors of the project.

== Plot ==
Sam's (Elmira Harutyunyan), a 15-16 year old teen best friend is Sarah (Mary Stepanyan) now. But Sam tells us that actually they weren't always friends. Only two months ago they even did not want to hear each other's names. Two months ago Sam and Sarah were invited to their mutual friend Marie's (Marianna Mkhchyan) birthday party. Though they were unpleasantly surprised meeting each other at Marie's birthday party, they decided to ignore each other and have fun. But they could not. Soon an unexpected thing happened and Marie told that all the guests had to leave the house because she had to go as soon as she could. Everybody left the house with Marie except for Sam and Sarah. They were left alone in the house accidentally. At first they weren't going on with each other but soon they found a common language.

== Cast ==
- Elmira Harutyunyan
- Mary Stepanyan
- Marianna Mkhchyan

== Production ==
On March 1, 2015, Elmira Harutyunyan entered to star in an untitled film which was to be directed by Annie Amirjanian. The film will be Amirjanian's and Harutyunyan's debut. Later on March 2 Marianna Mkhchyan joined the cast of the film which by then had been given the title The Haters. Mary Stepanyan joined the cast on June 24. All the other cast members joined the cast of The Haters later in June. Before Stepanyan joined the project it was planned Marianna Movsesyan to play Sarah. Movsesyan joined the cast on March 4 but in the end she did not come on board and the co-authors of the project decided to invite Stepanyan to play Sarah and soon she entered negotiations to star in The Haters.

== Filming ==
The start date for principal photography was announced on July 1, 2015 in Ajapnyak District, Yerevan, Armenia. Filming locations will include Nor-Nork 6th micro-district, Yerevan, Armenia. The Haters will be produced by Annie Amirjanian and Elmira Harutyunyan who are the founders of the Buddy pictures. Buddy Pictures is also the worldwide distributor of The Haters.

== Release ==
On June 20, 2015 Buddy Pictures set the film for an August 1, 2015 release.
