= Hatert =

Coordinates: 51°48.5′N 5°49.5′E

- Suburb
- Location within Netherlands
- Country: Netherlands
- Province: Gelderland
- Municipality: Nijmegen

Population (2021)
  - Total: 10,115
- Time zone: UTC+1 (CET)
  - Summer (DST): UTC+2 (CEST)

Hatert is a suburb in the south of Nijmegen, in the Netherlands. As of 2021 it has a population of 10.115.

It is situated between the centre of Nijmegen and the suburb of Dukenburg. It is renowned for its big shopping centre Hatert Centrum and the market every Wednesday attracts a lot of visitors from all over the town. It is a relatively new suburb having been created in the 20th century.

Hatert was built around a village with the same name. It is the biggest district in Nijmegen (based on population numbers).

SV Hatert is the local Hatert soccer club. Maas-Waalkanaal is the local canal that runs alongside Hatert.
