= Allport's Scale =

Measure of social prejudice

Allport's Scale of Prejudice and Discrimination is a measure of the manifestation of prejudice in a society. It was devised by psychologist Gordon Allport in 1954.

== The scale ==
Allport's Scale of Prejudice goes from one to five, measuring the intensity or "degrees of antipathy" toward marginalized "out-groups".

1. Antilocution: Antilocution occurs when an in-group freely purports negative images of an out-group. Hate speech is the extreme form of this stage. It is commonly seen as harmless by the majority. Antilocution itself may not be harmful, but it sets the stage for more severe outlets for prejudice (see also ethnic joke).
2. Avoidance: Members of the in-group actively avoid people in the out-group. No direct harm may be intended, but psychological harm often results through isolation (see also social exclusion).
3. Discrimination: The out-group is discriminated against by being denied opportunities and services, putting prejudice into action. Behaviors have the intention of disadvantaging the out-group by preventing them from achieving goals, getting education or jobs, etc. Examples include Jim Crow laws in the US, Apartheid in South Africa, and the Nuremberg Laws in 1930s Germany.
4. Physical attack: The in-group vandalizes, burns, or otherwise destroys out-group property and carries out violent attacks on individuals or groups. Physical harm is done to members of the out-group. Examples include pogroms against Jews in Europe, the lynchings of Black people in the US, and ongoing violence against Hindus in Pakistan and Muslims in India.
5. Extermination: The in-group seeks extermination or removal of the out-group. They attempt to eliminate either the entirety or a large fraction of the undesired group of people. Examples include the Cambodian genocide, the Final Solution in Nazi Germany, the Rwandan genocide, the Armenian genocide, and the genocide of the Hellenes.

This scale should not be confused with the Religious Orientation Scale (ROS) of Allport and Ross (1967), which is a measure extrinsic and intrinsic religious orientation to determine the maturity of an individual's religious conviction.

== See also ==
- Allophilia
- Ten Stages of genocide
- Intercultural competence
- Intolerance
