= De Vrije Gedachte =

Dutch freethinkers' society "The Free Thought"

De Vrije Gedachte The Free Thought
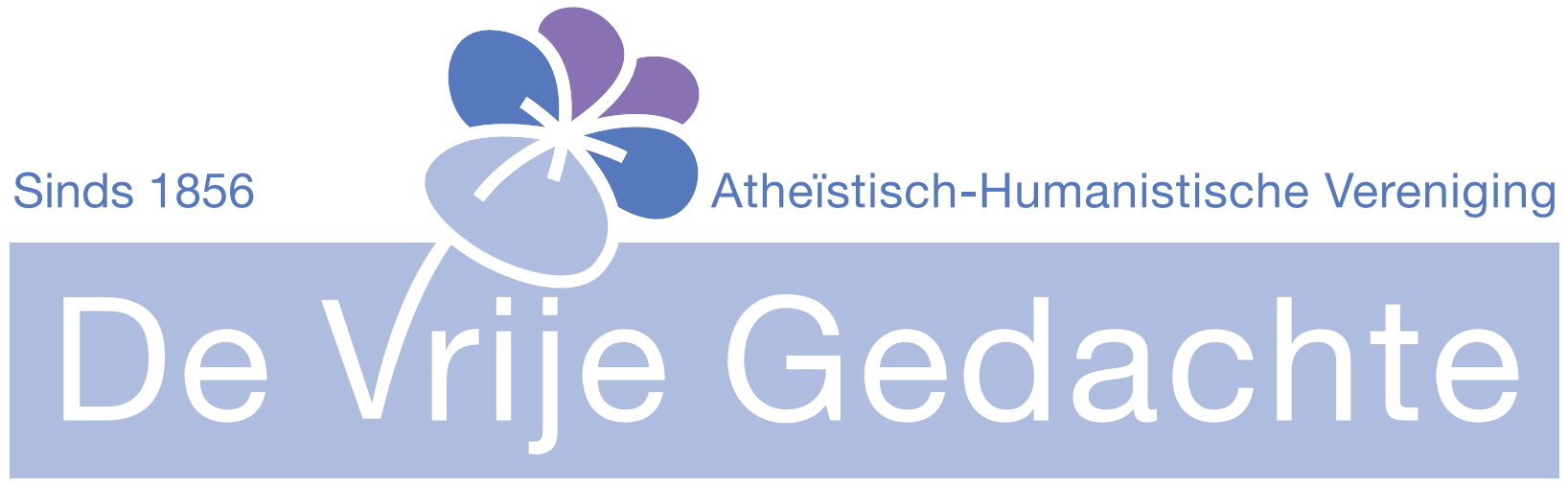
- Formation: 12 October 1856; 170 years ago
- Type: Nonprofit organisation
- Purpose: Promoting atheistic humanism
- Headquarters: Utrecht
- Region served: Netherlands
- Members: 500 (2013)
- Chair: Stanley Bakker
- Website: www.devrijegedachte.nl Pronunciation of 'De Vrije Gedachte'

Vrijdenkersvereniging De Vrije Gedachte (DVG) (English: Freethinkers association The Free Thought), is a Dutch atheist–humanist association of freethinkers. It was founded in 1856 and known by the name De Dageraad ("The Dawn") before assuming its present name in 1957. De Vrije Gedachte strives to use reason, natural science and logic to liberate humanity from prejudices, clerical paternalism, dogmas and false truths.

== History ==
=== Origins ===
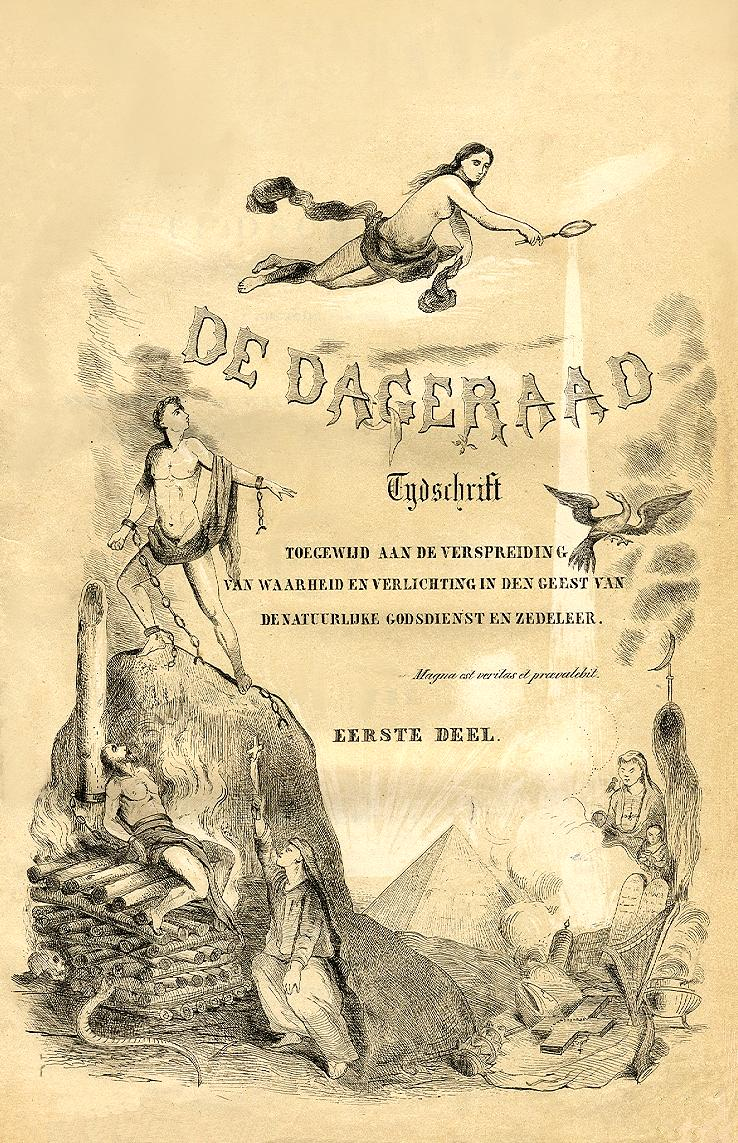
Cover of the first De Dageraad.

According to Bert Gasenbeek, Hans Blom and Jo Nabuurs, the organised freethought movement in the Netherlands commenced with the publication of Licht en Schaduwbeelden uit de binnenlanden van Java door de Gebroeders Dag en Nacht ("Light and Shadow Images From the Inlands of Java by the Brethren Day and Night", 1854). Originally released anonymously, this treatise by physician and ethnologist Franz Wilhelm Junghuhn (1809–1864) narrates a fictional journey across the Dutch East Indian island of Java, during which a discussion unfolds between four scientists who represent materialism (Morgenrood, "Red sky at morning"), deism (Dag, "Day"), pantheism (Avondrood, "Afterglow") and orthodox Christianity (Nacht, "Night"), respectively. The first three scientists rely on reason, and start out with nature as the source of knowledge about truth, which in those days was referred to as the 'natural religion'. This approach led them to deny the existence of a personal or supernatural God. Because this posed a direct challenge to the (at that time in the Netherlands still dominant) position of Christianity as revealed religion, the controversial book received a storm of criticism.

Because the publisher found a second edition too risky, the dissident Amsterdam Masonic Lodge Post Nubila Lux ("After the clouds, the light"), of which Junghuhn was a member, and where the book was warmly welcomed, decided to take over its publication under leadership of Frans Christiaan Günst (1823–1885), defying the scorn of outsiders. As a continuation of Licht en schaduwbeelden, the Lodge decided to found the magazine De Dageraad (The Dawn), that was issued for the first time on 1 October 1855. The magazine's motto was: "Magna est veritas et praevalebit" ("Mighty is the truth and it shall prevail").

On 12 October 1856, freethinkers association De Dageraad ("The Dawn") was founded in Amsterdam by the editorial staff of the magazine, including Günst (publisher of De Dageraad) and the first chair Rudolf Charles d'Ablaing van Giessenburg (1826–1904). In total, 44 men joined the new society. There was no balloting, and partly due to d'Ablaing's sympathy towards feminism, it was during his chairmanship (1856–1865) that women were readily admitted. A similar association, De Lichtstraal ("The Lightbeam"), founded in 1855 by Goose Wijnand van der Voo in Rotterdam with 20 members and an identically named magazine, merged with De Dageraad in 1857. De Dageraad's character had less and less to do with freemasonry and, increasingly, focused on rationalism and the natural sciences.

=== Growth, crisis and recovery ===
The association increased its membership and influence partially due to Hendrik H. Huisman (1821–1873), secretary from 1859 on and chair from 1865 on. Writer Eduard Douwes Dekker (Multatuli), who never formally became a member, achieved fame in this period through his popular passionate writings that criticised society. Thereafter the association suffered from internal disputes: in 1867, twenty deistic members seceded to form the social activist group De Humaniteit ("Humaneness"). Other members walked away, and the publication of De Dageraad was interrupted, which broke the national bond between freethinkers

In an attempt to innovate, the association briefly changed its name to Het Vrije Onderzoek ("The Free Inquiry", 1873–1876), and jointly published a Manifesto with De Humaniteit in 1875 calling on 'all those free from faith in the Netherlands' to join forces for separation of church and state; poor relief by the government instead of the churches; and compulsory primary education. The two barely surviving associations reconciled. In 1878, De Humaniteit (5 members) merged with De Dageraad (11 members), after which it made a remarkable recovery. De Dageraad's publication continued with a now firmly atheistic materialist tone. Furthermore, the association's structure was democratised, it actively sought publicity, and the now politically and philosophically extremely diverse board of directors welcomed social anarchist Ferdinand Domela Nieuwenhuis to its ranks. By 1882, membership had grown to 357.

In 1880s, the 'Dageradianen' ("Dawnians", also called 'Dageraadsmannen' or "Dawnmen" and 'Dageraadsvrouwen' or "Dawnwomen", respectively) focused increasingly on philosophical materialism and atheism under the influence of Ernst Haeckel, Ludwig Büchner, Charles Darwin and the Dutch Jacob Moleschott (later honorary member), whilst more and more freethinking feminists such as Aletta Jacobs, Wilhelmina Drucker, Elise Haighton (secretary and editor-in-chief of De Dageraad) and Titia van der Tuuk (board member) came to the fore and made women's emancipation a central theme. Moreover, the 17th century philosopher Spinoza became an idol for many association members.

=== Interwar period ===
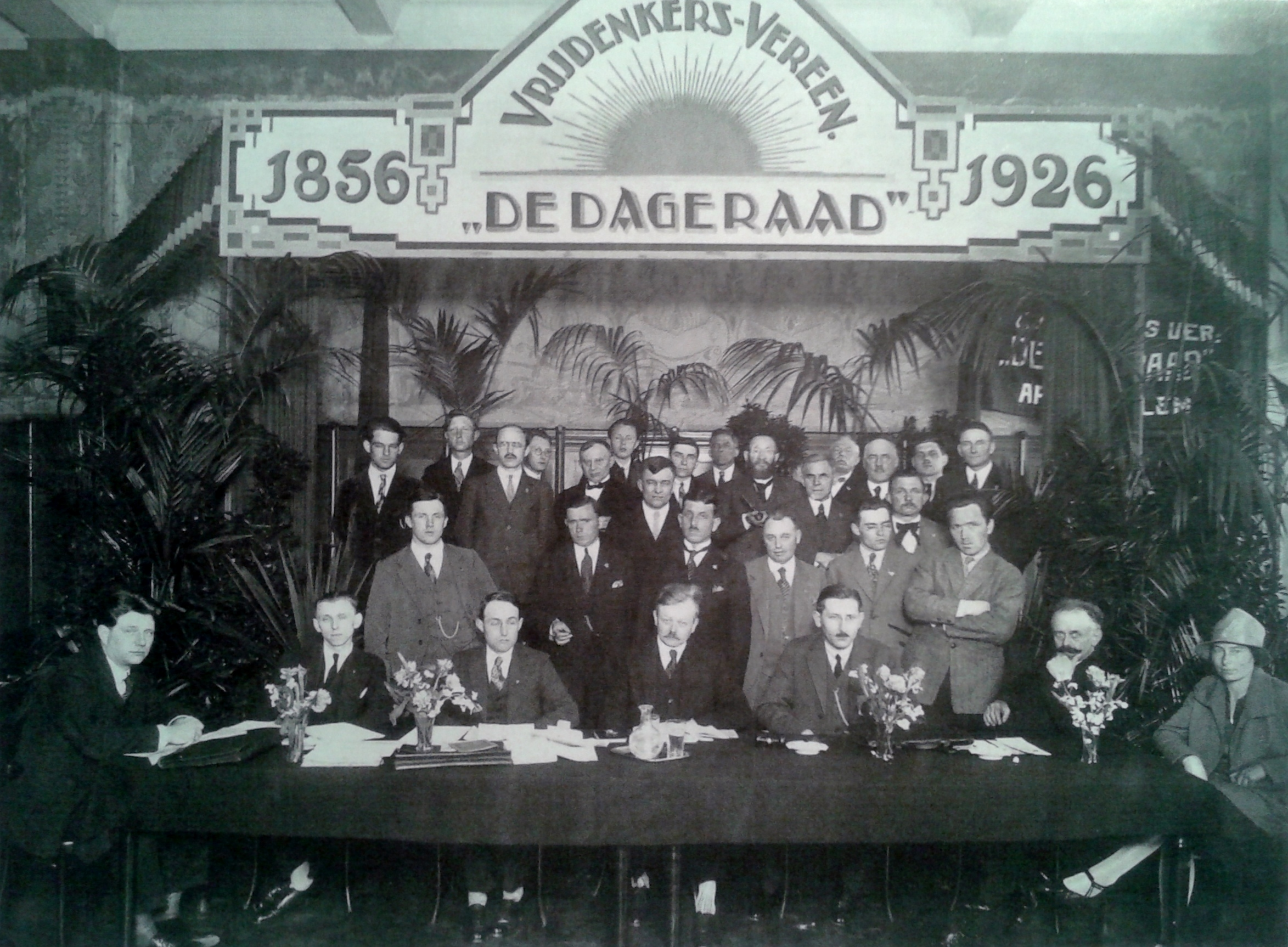
Group portrait at the 70th anniversary of De Dageraad in 1926.

In the period 1903–1933, De Dageraad's membership grew from 613 to 2700, with 40 regional branches. At first, there existed a lot of mistrust amongst freethinkers regarding the parliamentary democracy, seeing the adoption of universal suffrage in 1917/1919 had significantly strengthened the position of confessionalist political parties. Furthermore, the Communists and Social Democrats, that included several self-declared freethinkers, appeared unwilling to attack religion in the House of Representatives, because they did not want to exclude themselves from forming a ruling coalition with the Roman Catholic State Party. To oppose the now more Christian politics, some freethinkers partook in several small anti-clerical and early Fascist protest parties, that initially looked up to Mussolini as 'the former socialist and religion-fighter'. In 1920, the main board of De Dageraad refused to found a political party that was officially linked to the association, to prevent infighting within its ranks.

Two years later, independently from De Dageraad, the Kiesvereeniging Vrijdenkers naar het Parlement ("Electoral Association Freethinkers into Parliament", 1922–1925) was founded by some of its members, who wanted to do battle against all that "bears a slight likeness to God and servility towards God". It resisted capitalism and militarism with the slogan 'The Netherlands out of the Church's grip', pleaded for an absolute separation of church and state, and free public education. Although Catholics constantly besmirched election posters, or pulled them from the walls, the Electoral Association managed to get 1100 votes (0.4%) in the constituency of Amsterdam. After participating in five constituencies during the 1925 elections, with an average result of just 0.12% per constituency, the party disappeared again. On the other hand, most freethinkers quickly lost their sympathy for Fascism when that evolved into a violent movement that embraced Catholicism and capitalism. To expose the opportunism of Mussolini and pope Pius XI (who would sign the Lateran Treaty soon after), De Dageraad in 1928 published a speech by Mussolini from 1904 in which he disproved the existence of God. Confronted with the rise of totalitarian forms of both Fascism and Communism, Dageradianen started to defend parliamentary democracy more and more, even though both extremes and anarchism continued to be represented within the association.

In 1921, the bylaws of De Dageraad (article 2) stated for the first time that freethinkers, 'from the perspective of reason', placed themselves 'on an atheistic standpoint'. The Interior Minister Heemskerk (Anti-Revolutionary Party) refused to grant royal permission to this bylaws amendment in 1924, because atheism would go against morality and the public order, and lead to anarchy. After fierce debates in the House of Representatives, the Christian confessionalist majority rallied in support of the minister. De Vrijdenker freethought magazine mocked that Christianity had no monopoly on morality, and De Dageraad called for people to leave the church via the Comité Kerkafscheiding ("Committee for Apostasy"), and offered to help those who wished to terminate their membership (to which 3250 people responded in 1925). Eventually, the association decided that royal permission was important after all, and appointed special professor in philosophy of law, Leo Polak, to rewrite the bylaws. The emphasis on fighting religious dogmas and unquestionable authority was maintained, but the word 'atheistic' omitted; these bylaws were accepted by the government in 1927.

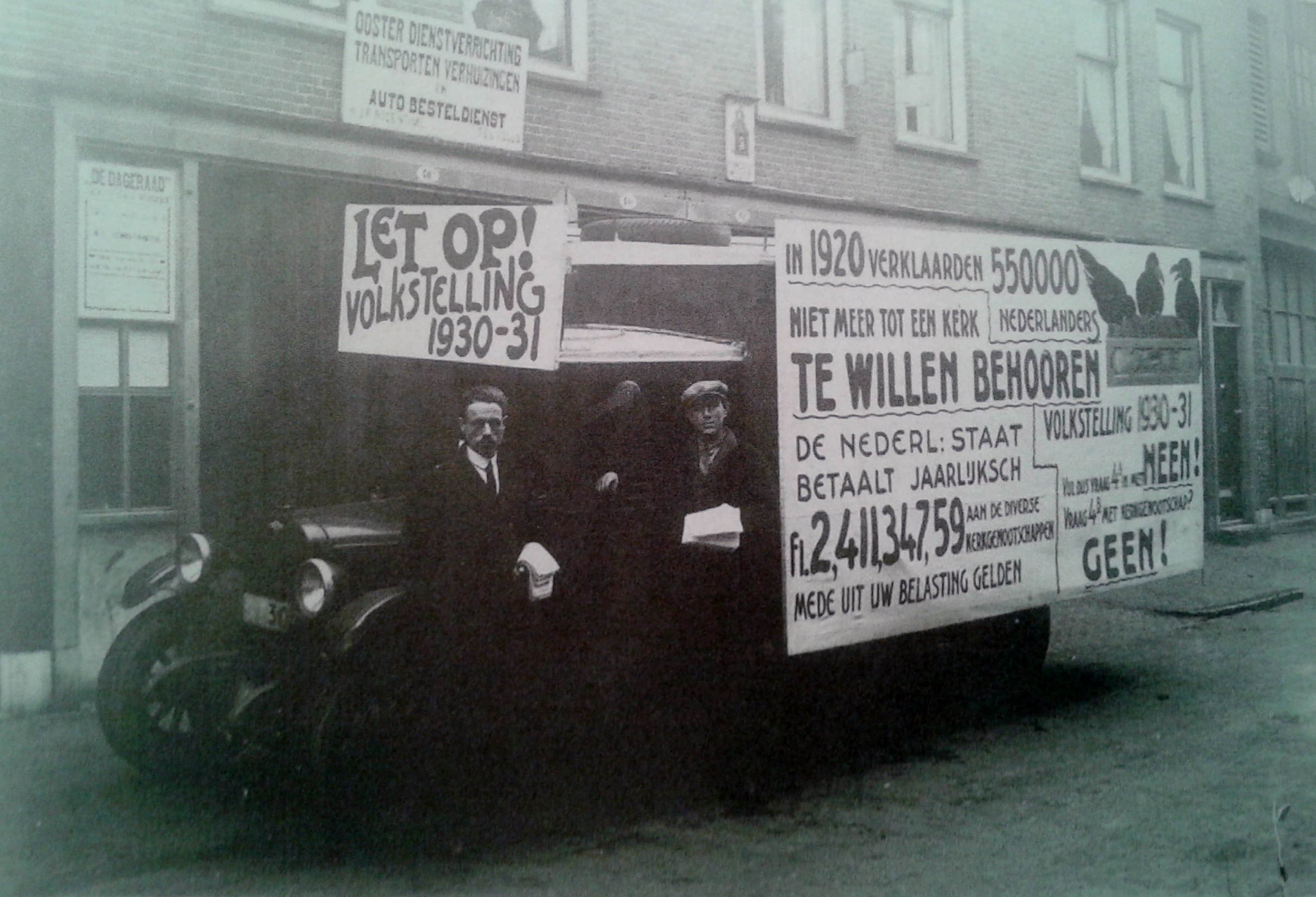
Freethinkers in Rotterdam protest the 1930–31 census.

In 1928, after the socialist VARA had refused cooperation, De Dageraad obtained radio airtime for the first time through the foundation of the Vrijdenkers Radio Omroepvereeniging (VRO, "Freethinkers Radio Broadcasting Association"). It grew remarkably, with its membership peaking at 9000 people in 1933, much more than the association itself and its magazine. On 29 September 1928, the VRO was allowed to broadcast for the first time as an experiment, under supervision of a governmental commission. However, soon after chairman Jan Hoving started his speech on the controversial topic of "Mussolini as freethinker, and as suppressor of the freedom of thought", the broadcast was interrupted by the commission, that later stated he had offended 'the Prime Minister of a befriended nation of the Netherlands', and damaged the reputation of 'the Chief of the Roman Catholic Church'. The act of censorship was widely condemned by the other media from left to right, and eventually the minister had to admit intervening too quickly, granting the VRO permission to continue broadcasting. It took several more years before the VRO was given an official and regular airtime: in the summer of 1932, it was assigned an hour on the first Saturday of every month. The radio commission did acknowledge the right of freethinkers to express their nonbelief in God, but also found their broadcasts were not allowed to be offensive to believers. Violation of this rule would result in censoring some passages or entire episodes.

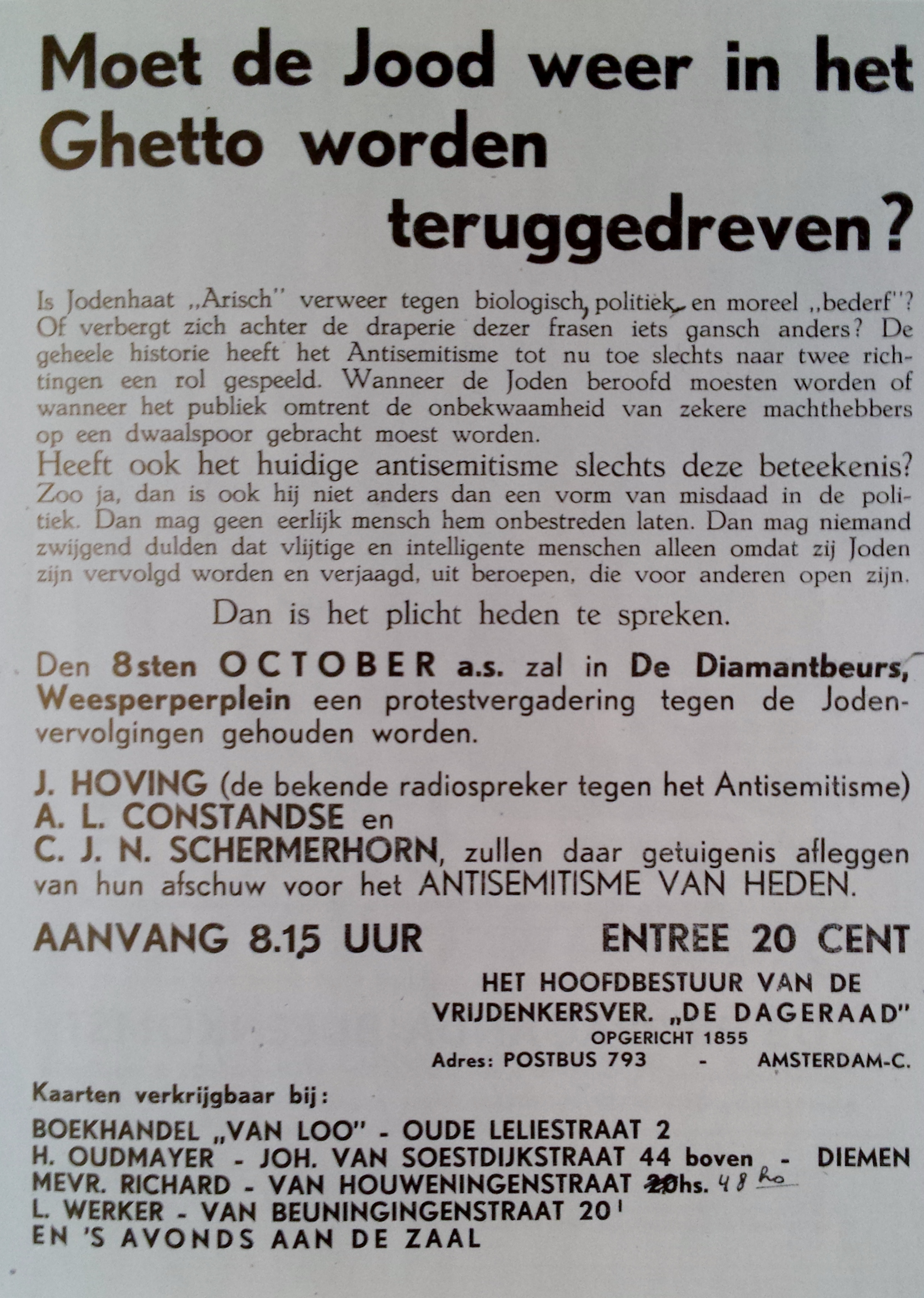
Protest rally against antisemitism and persecution of Jews in 1935.

De Dageraad earned notability through its broadcasts, creating opposition especially from Catholic organisations, who vainly tried to have the association banned. However, in 1932 the confessionalist majority in parliament adopted a blasphemy law which, although primarily aimed against Communists, also seriously limited the activities of freethinkers. The following year, civil servants were barred from membership of De Dageraad, and the association's writing were banned from public buildings. Hoving's fierce criticism of Nazi Germany, that was still an ally of the Dutch government at the time, and Leo Polak's criticism of religion, led to more censorship by the government, and in 1936, the VRO's broadcasting rights were completely revoked. Between 1933 and 1936, about a quarter of the VRO's episodes had been partially censored, another quarter wholly cancelled.

Catholic groups and the National Socialist Movement in the Netherlands (NSB) became increasingly hostile towards De Dageraad. After a 16 October 1936 article in Volk en Vaderland entitled "Blasphemers", in which the NSB paper demanded the VRO broadcasts to be outlawed, several dozens of NSB members (the WA) violently disrupted a grand meeting of freethinkers in Utrecht on 26 October. Although denying any connection to the NSB's actions, confessionalist parliamentarians soon urged the government to ban the VRO's broadcasts, to which Interior Minister de Wilde agreed on 16 November, entering in effect from 1 January 1937. De Dageraad's magazine De Vrijdenker continued to oppose and warn against the atrocities committed by Nazi Germany, including publishing a long list of murdered German Jews.

As soon as Germany invaded the Netherlands in May 1940, De Dageraad immediately ordered all local branches to disband and destroy their archives, whilst the publication of De Vrijdenker was discontinued and the list of subscribers destroyed. The board kept convening in secret, but in effect the association had disappeared. Jewish atheist Louis Fles committed suicide shortly after the occupation began; Jewish atheist Leo Polak was deported to Sachsenhausen where he died in 1941; Anton Constandse was deported to Buchenwald, later imprisoned in Kamp Sint-Michielsgestel, but he survived.

=== Post-war recovery ===
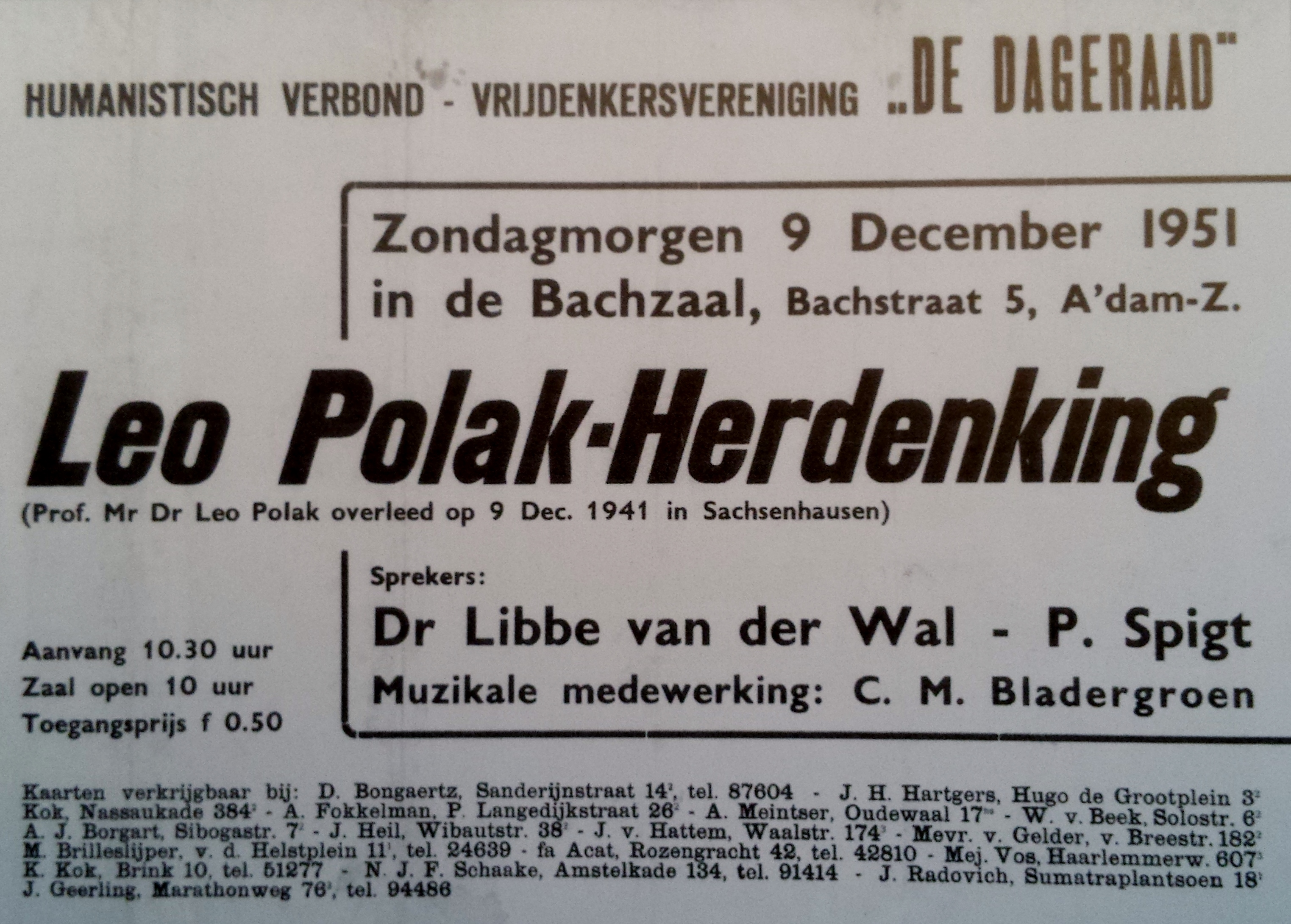
1951 commemoration of Leo Polak, co-hosted by De Dageraad and the HV.

After the war, De Dageraad was reinstated and recovered quickly, helped by the fact it had taken an outspoken antifascist position before the war. Several local branches and magazines were founded, the main board convened again on 17 June 1945. During a conference on 27–28 October 1945, about 1150 members were present, and 9 branches represented. The new magazine De Vrijdenker, that counted well-known freethinkers such as Anton Constandse and Piet Spigt amongst its editorial staff, soon achieved over 2300 subscribers (1 June 1946), a year later 2645. De Dageraad sought cooperation with the newly founded Humanistisch Verbond (HV, "Humanist League") and Humanitas (Latin for "Humanity"). From 1957 onwards, the association continued under the name: De Vrije Gedachte (Vereniging tot bevordering van zelfstandig denken) ("The Free Thought (Association for the promotion of independent thought)"), with its magazine renamed to Bevrijdend denken ("Liberating thinking"). Despite considerable competition between De Vrije Gedachte, that held on to combatting church and religion, and the HV, that was primarily concerned with giving the unchurched an equal place in society, most DVG members opined cooperation was necessary, leading the board to advocate for dual memberships; however, a merger with the HV was rejected.

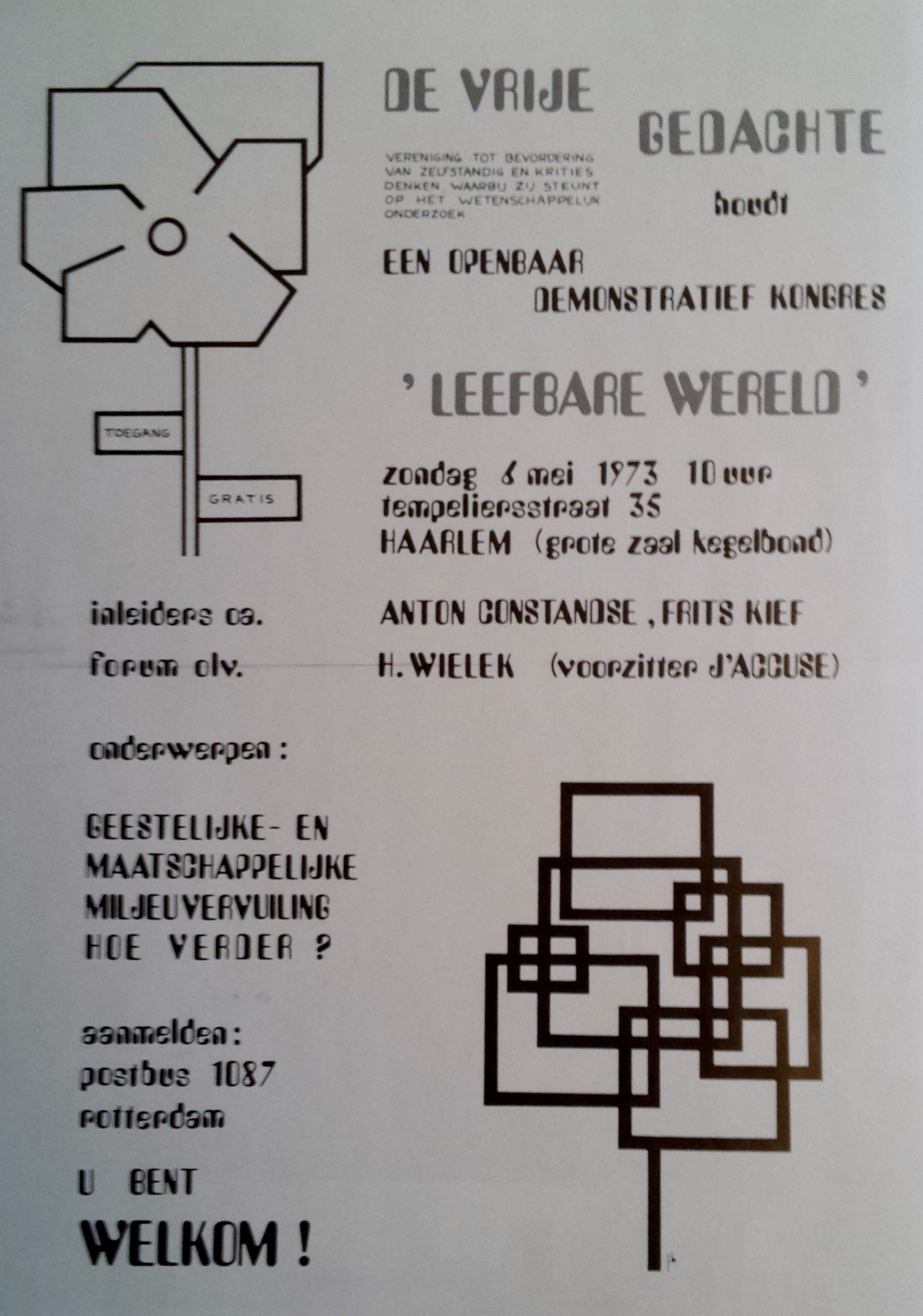
Placard for a public DVG congress on a 'livable world' in 1973.

In 1949, DVG and the HV co-founded the A.H. Gerhard Foundation, that only after a long struggle managed to provide elderly care for the unchurched and unbelievers in 1959. In the early 1960s, De Vrije Gedachte went through a relatively dormant phase, losing many of its members, reducing its activities and publishing irregular and low-quality magazines that changed names four times. In the late 1960s, a small revival occurred through new young members, who resisted the world that was organised by the old generation. They protested against the Vietnam War, and created their own culture around pop music, flower power and sexual liberation. DVG played an important role in rethinking sexual morality, promoting women's emancipation, and reducing the influence of the churches; it often partnered with the Dutch Society for Sexual Reform (NVSH) in sex education activities. In 1978, the association changed its full name to Vrijdenkersvereniging De Vrije Gedachte ("Freethinkers' association The Free Thought"). New bylaws were agreed upon that focused on atheism and collaboration with other humanist organisations.

=== Millennium shift ===
Because of an amendment of the Mediawet ("Media Act"), in May 1995 the Commissariaat voor de Media deprived De Vrije Gedachte of the hour television airtime and the 15 minutes radio airtime that it had been allotted every year; the 12,000 supporters did not satisfy the new requirement of 90,000. After protest and a refusal of the Humanistisch Verbond to cooperate because it found DVG "too radical", the Commissariaat upheld the decision. Since September 1995, DVG has been active on the Internet. In July 1996, the HV and DVG decided to cooperate after all, forming the Humanistische Omroep. On 25 October that year, together with Humanitas and the University of Humanistic Studies, they co-founded the Humanist Historical Centre (HHC). During the 2003–2005 Metamorfozeproject, the HHC digitalised over 100,000 freethinkers' publications.

In the late 1990s, all regional branches of DVG were dissolved, and for a while it appeared the association itself would disappear, but partially due to the rise of Islam, especially after the September 11 attacks, there was once again a need for a firmly atheistic stance in society. DVG joined the Humanistische Alliantie ("Humanist Alliance"), a national umbrella for humanist organisations founded in 2001, but because they found this coalition much too postmodernist and moderate, the freethinkers were hardly involved in its activities. Under chairship of Anton van Hooff, who opined that the 'combativeness against religion and other unscientific quackery' is threatening to disappear with the 'softened' humanist groups, they left the Alliantie in 2014, and instead sought to work with amongst others Stichting Skepsis and the Vereniging tegen de Kwakzalverij.

== Purpose ==
Since its foundation in 1856, the bylaws of De Dageraad/De Vrije Gedachte have been amended in 1866, 1910, 1921, 1927 and 1978. In 2006, Peter Derkx identified six components that the association has always tried to promote: (1) truth, reason and science; (2) freedom of expression and tolerance; (3) atheism and humanism; (4) separation of church and state; (5) development of human personality; (6) solidarity with other human beings. The present bylaws of De Vrije Gedachte state it:

# Stands for strict separation of church and state;

1. Seeks to safeguard education and teaching from indoctrination;
2. Will always promote a critical, inquiring and scientific attitude;
3. Will debunk religion, pseudoscience and other delusions;
4. Stands for freedom of expression;
5. Respects the dignity of man as a being whose existence is single and finite;
6. Recognises full self-determination of the human being;
7. Respects other living beings and the environment.

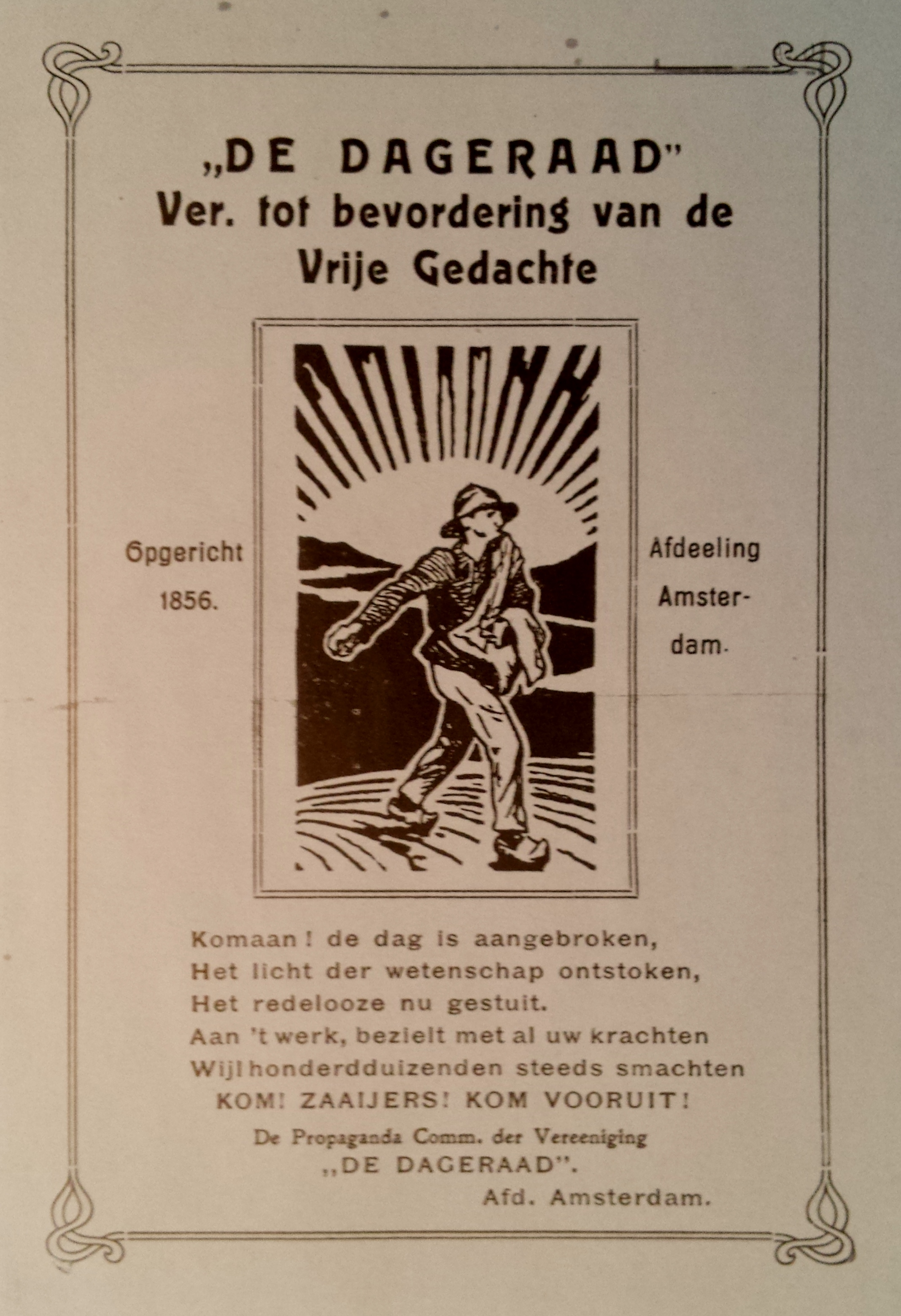
This poster from c. 1920 calls De Dageraad an "Ass[ociation] to promote the Free Thought".

=== Secularism ===
According to Derkx, freethought does not necessarily lead to atheism, but it does strive towards a pluriform society. In Derkx' view, this includes a separation of church and state in the sense that the government does not give preference to any (supporters and organisations of a) particular life stance. This means the state may either not support any religious or life stance organisation (financially) or support them all equally by, for example, giving airtime to churches as well as humanists and freethinkers within the Dutch public broadcasting system or subsidising both religious education and humanist education. Another important issue for the association is safeguarding education and teaching from indoctrination; it wants to prevent children from getting one single belief system imposed on them before they have developed the intellectual capacities to critically consider them for themselves.

=== Skepticism ===
De Vrije Gedachte aims to fight against dogma, prejudice and an unscientific attitude. At its foundation in 1856, its members still sought the guidance of a kind of natural theology, in the 1920s they had progressed to a positivist-empiricist view of the world. In the course of the 20th century, the realisation grew that freethinkers themselves do not "own" reason and truth either, and in the 21st century ontological and ethical judgements are starkly viewed in the light of tentativeness and conditionality.

=== Freedom of expression and tolerance ===
According to Derkx, freethought serves to get one closer to the truth. To be able to think freely, freedom of expression, free inquiry, freedom of association, freedom of assembly and tolerance are essential. All relevant possibilities about how the world is and works or should work, may be considered, discussed, investigated and argued out, despite potential aversion one may have regarding certain ideas. In the end, true knowledge is not achieved by any individual alone, but by a free exchange of thoughts with others. All ideas may be proposed and also criticised, no single opinion may be excluded.

=== Atheism and humanism ===
De Vrije Gedachte is an atheist organisation.

Historically, the question whether freethought is in fact atheistic or not has been contentious. Early Dageradianen still often regarded themselves as deists or pantheists, but as science progressed, their share diminished. From 1921 until 1927, the association explicitly called itself "atheistic" in its bylaws, but because the government opined that a lack of Christian morality would disrupt public order, and therefore withheld approval, it removed that word again. Since 1978, De Vrije Gedachte has profiled itself as an atheist–humanist association: atheistic because it rejects every conception of God because of the lack of evidence for the existence of supernatural beings, humanistic because it posits the human individual as the central focus, and starts from the idea that man created God and not vice versa. Although it is deemed theoretically impossible to disprove the existence of God, it is also impossible to be an agnostic in practice, and in everyday life one does not consider the possibility of God's existence.

=== Development of human personality ===
By rationally seeking the truth, thinking freely, holding free discussions and testing teachings and authorities, freethinkers strive towards the full development of the human personality, with the emphasis on moral and rational conscience. This includes amongst other things an atheistic worldview, the choice for solidarity with fellow human beings, and the realisation that life is finite and a one-off occurrence. Also, physical and emotional development is considered important for a healthy and happy life. Precisely because life is finite, it is unique and valuable, and should be experienced to the fullest. Emotionally, one needs to cope with doubt, because the critical examination of one's own dearly held beliefs, and letting go of them if they turn out to be false, is necessary to seek the truth.

=== Solidarity ===
Freethinkers strive towards the common happiness of humanity, not just that of themselves. To achieve this, in the first 150 years of its existence De Vrije Gedachte fought for freedom of expression, separation of church and state, the possibility of cremation, raising and educating children free of religious dogmas, broadening the options for divorce and the rights of labourers. Simultaneously, it protested against 'repressive' religions and churches, the double sexual standard, militarism, antisemitism, fascism and an authoritarian government.

== Activities ==
=== Magazines ===
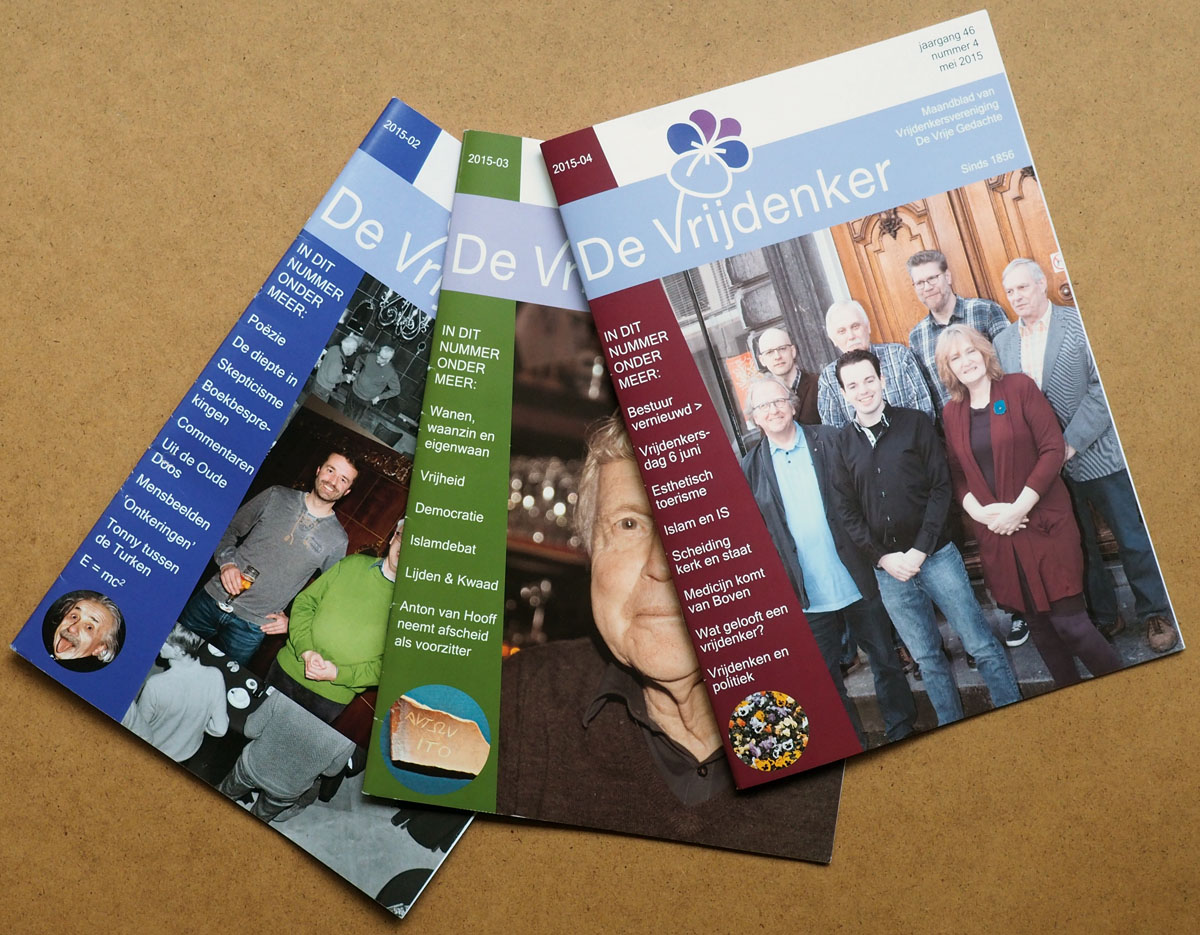
2015 Spring issues of De Vrijdenker.

A year before the association De Dageraad was founded, the first issue of the monthly periodical De Dageraad appeared on 1 October 1855. In the beginning, the magazine De Dageraad took on a rather autonomous, deistic approach under the influence of Junghuhn, while the association itself was open to atheists, pantheists, materialists, liberals, socialists and conservatives in the philosophical, religious or political sense. The radical chair d'Ablaing tried to publish three other magazines in 1858: Verbond der Vrije Gedachte ("League of the Free Thought", for the association), De Rechtbank des onderzoeks ("The Court of Inquiry", for Biblical criticism) and Tijdgenoot op het gebied der Rede ("Contemporarian on the Terrain of Reason", for philosophical questions). Due to a lack of funds in the next year, all three were bundled under the name Bliksemschicht der XIXe eeuw ("Lightning Bolt of the 19th Century"), after which it disappeared again. In 1867, De Dageraad did eventually become the association's official magazine. In 1859, Eduard Douwes Dekker used his pseudonym Multatuli for the first time in the ethical parable "Geloofsbelydenis" ("Creed") in De Dageraad, and in 1861 he published "Het gebed van den onwetende" ("The Prayer of the Ignorant") about his deconversion, which made him famous and loved amongst the Dageradianen.

Several times in 1868 and in the period 1870–1879, the publication was interrupted. In these years, freethought publications fragmented to distinct regional magazines; The Hague's De Toekomst ("The Future") was considered the semi-official paper of De Dageraad in 1870–1872. After the association survived a subsistence crisis, De Dageraad continued in October 1879 with the subtitle Maandschrift tot bespreking van maatschappelijke en zedelijke vraagstukken ("Monthly review for discussion on societal and moral issues"). In 1906, it was renamed De Vrije Gedachte ("The Free Thought"), in 1920 the national paper was absorbed into De Vrijdenker ("The Freethinker", 1913–1940) of the branch of Amsterdam, which then became the national edition. Because the distribution of De Vrijdenker was considered too dangerous under Nazi rule due to its firm pre-war antifascist attitude, it was immediately terminated when Nazi Germany occupied the Netherlands in May 1940.

De Vrijdenker was reestablished in 1945, appeared weekly and discussed all kinds of political and societal themes, from women's emancipation to environmental protection, from education to decolonisation. During the following decade three association magazines succeeded each other, each being published irregularly on poor quality material (stenciled folders on grey paper): Bevrijdend Denken ("Liberating Thinking", 1959–1963), Ratio (Latin for "Reason", 1964–1965) and Rede (Dutch for "Reason", 1964–1970). De Vrije Gedachte has published the magazine De Vrije Gedachte – in 2006 renamed De Vrijdenker – ten times a year since 1970.

=== Freethinkers in the Pub ===
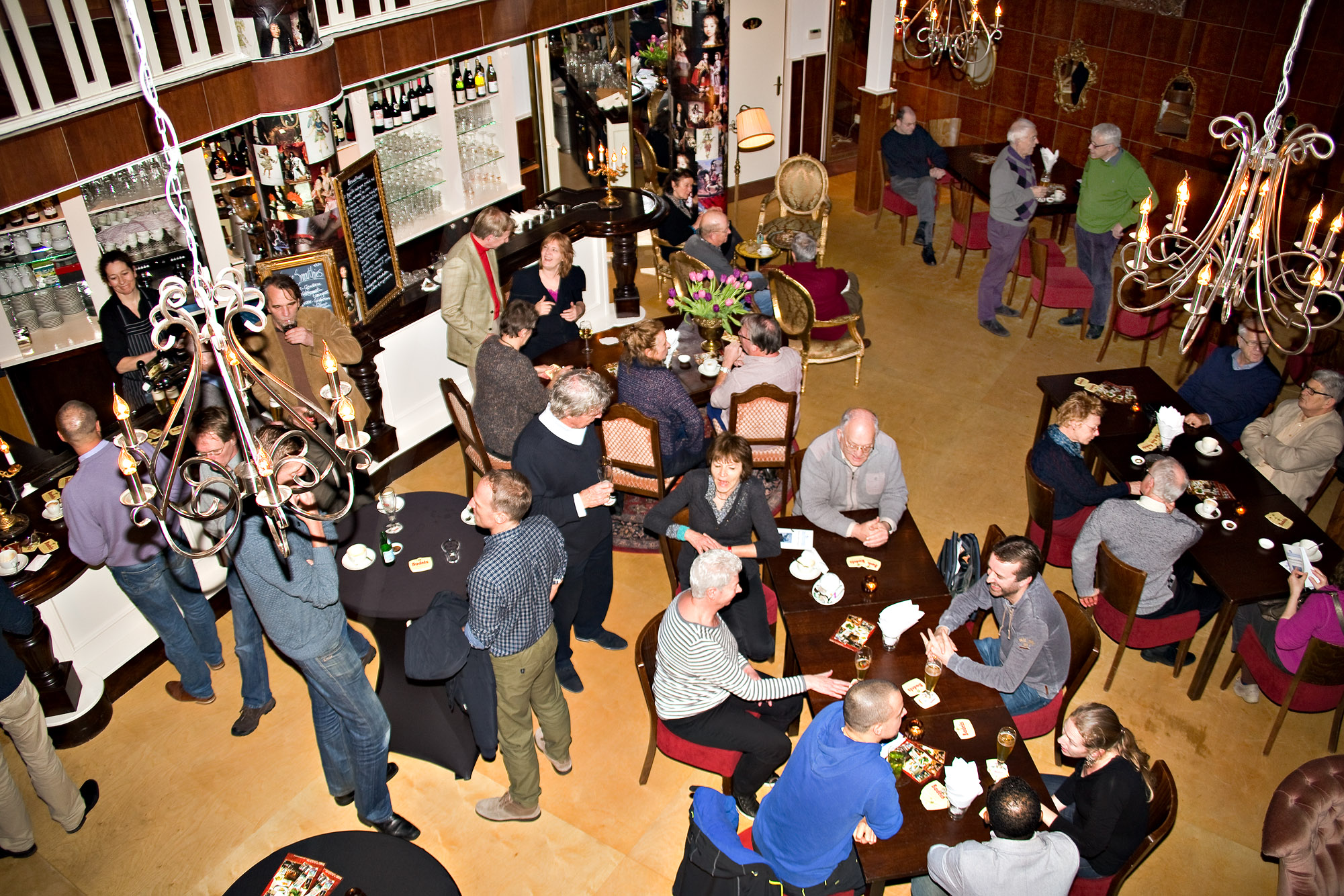
Haagse Verlichtingsborrel January 2015.

Freethinkers in the Pub (Dutch: Vrijdenkersborrels, formerly called Vrijdenkerscafés; comparable to Skeptics in the Pub) are monthly meetings meant for freethinkers and people interested in freethought to meet up and to have laid-back discussions, with a drink in an informal atmosphere, on broadly ranging (and current) topics from science to human rights. The initiative came from Richard Duijnstee and Jules Brabers in October 2012. Freethinkers in the Pub is autonomous from the national association.

- There has been a Vrijdenkersborrel Utrecht since 14 January 2013, where amongst others chair Anton van Hooff and historian Bart Leeuwenburgh have given lectures.
- A Vrijdenkersborrel Tafel van de Rede ("Table of Reason") has been active in Deventer since 9 November 2013 (co-organised by the Partij van de Rede – ASP, "Party of Reason").
- The Haagse Verlichtingsborrel ("The Hague Enlightenment Pub") has been held since 12 May 2014, where lectures have been given by many experts including physician Cees Renckens (Vereniging tegen de Kwakzalverij), mathematician Jan Willem Nienhuys (Stichting Skepsis) and lieutenant-colonel Norbert de Kooter (military humanist chaplain).
- There has been a Rotterdamse Verlichtingsborrel ("Rotterdam Enlightenment Pub") since 18 May 2015.

=== Anton Constandse Lecture and Freethinker of the Year ===
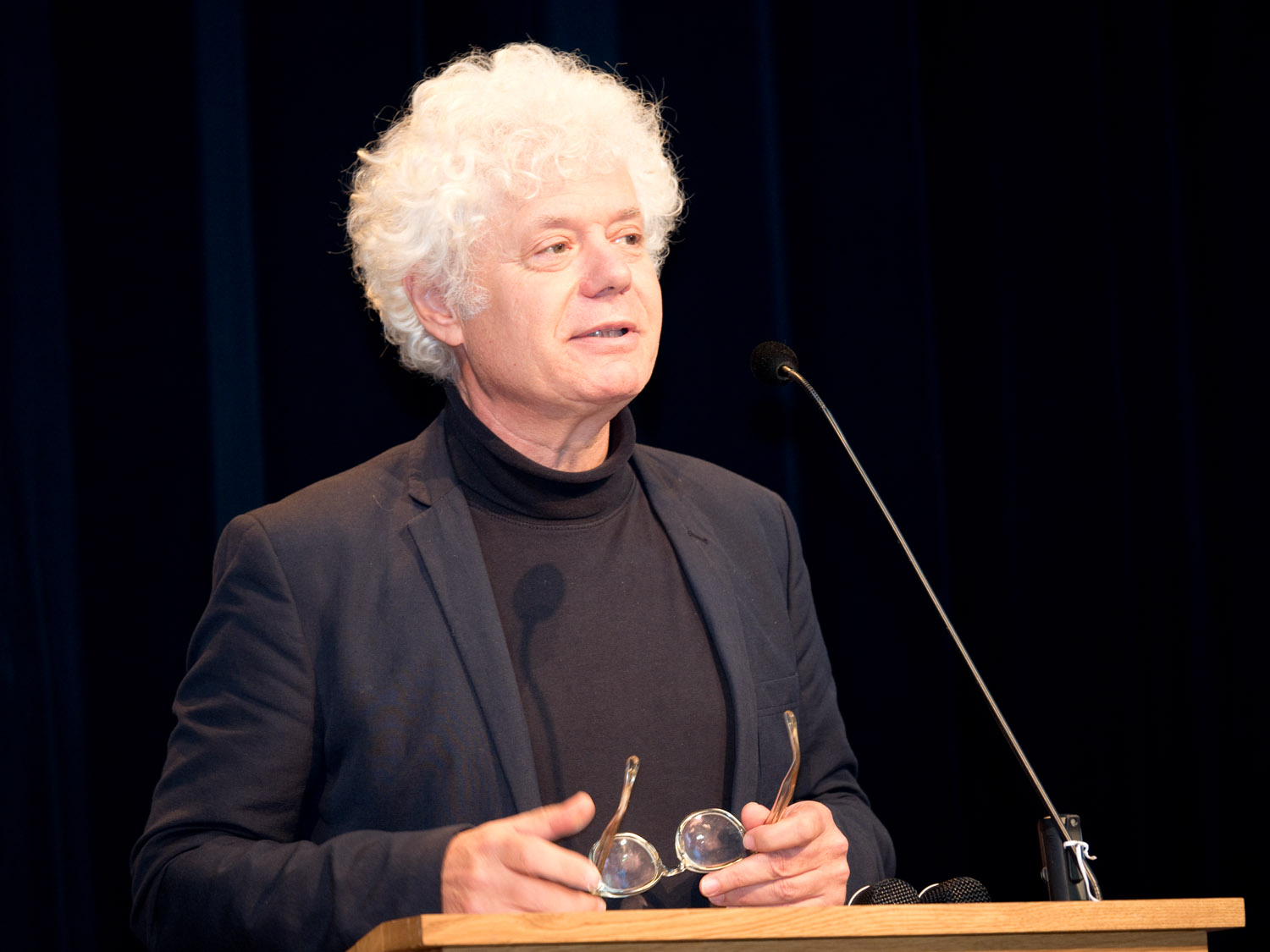
Paul Scheffer giving the Anton Constandse Lecture 2015.

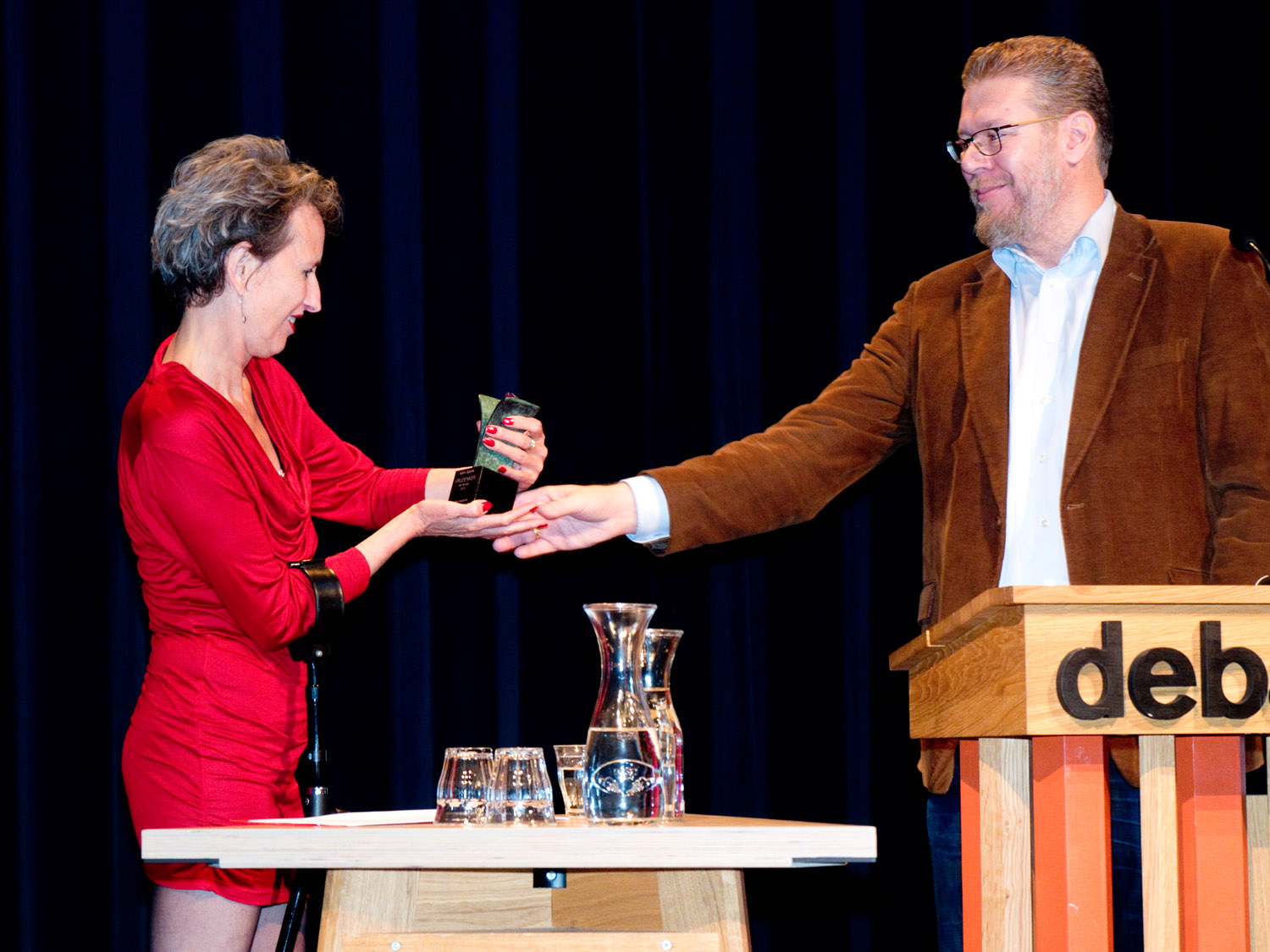
Fabian van Langevelde honours Karin Spaink as Freethinker of the Year 2015.

The Anton Constandse Lecture is a "lecture accessible to anyone interested in which a guest speaker that speaks to the imagination discusses a current theme that has a certain connection with, or finds its origins in, the body of thought" of De Vrije Gedachte. At the same occasion, the Freethinker of the Year (Vrijdenker van het Jaar) is also honoured since 2006. In the past, the following people have given the lecture or have been named Freethinker of the Year, respectively:

Anton Constandse Lecture
- 2002: Jaap van Heerden
- 2003: Siebe Thissen
- 2004: Jan G.A. ten Bokkel
- 2005: Maarten van Rossem
- 2006: Hans Jansen
- 2007: Elsbeth Etty
- 2008: Paul Cliteur
- 2009: Hans Dooremalen
- 2010: Dap Hartmann
- 2011: Ronald Plasterk
- 2012: Nelleke Noordervliet
- 2013: Winnie Sorgdrager
- 2014: Jan van Hooff
- 2015: Paul Scheffer
- 2016: Vincent Icke
- 2017: Maarten Boudry

Freethinker of the Year

- 2006: Wouter van Oorschot
- 2007: Dirk Verhofstadt
- 2008: Max Pam
- 2009: Midas Dekkers
- 2010: August Hans den Boef
- 2011: Herman Philipse
- 2012: Piet Borst
- 2013: Dick Swaab
- 2014: Hafid Bouazza
- 2015: Karin Spaink
- 2016: Arjen Lubach
- 2017: Maarten 't Hart

=== Other activities ===
- Each year, the Vrijdenkersdag ("Freethinkers' Day") is held in May or June.
- In 2009, 2011, 2012 and 2013, on the initiative of Floris van den Berg, De Vrije Gedachte and the Center for Inquiry Low Countries jointly hosted an Atheism Day in June.

== Well-known (former) members ==
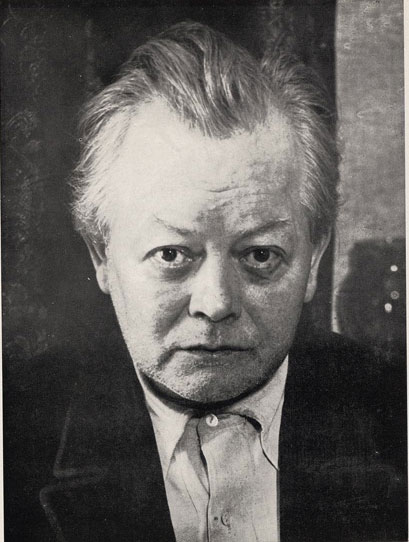
Jan Hoving

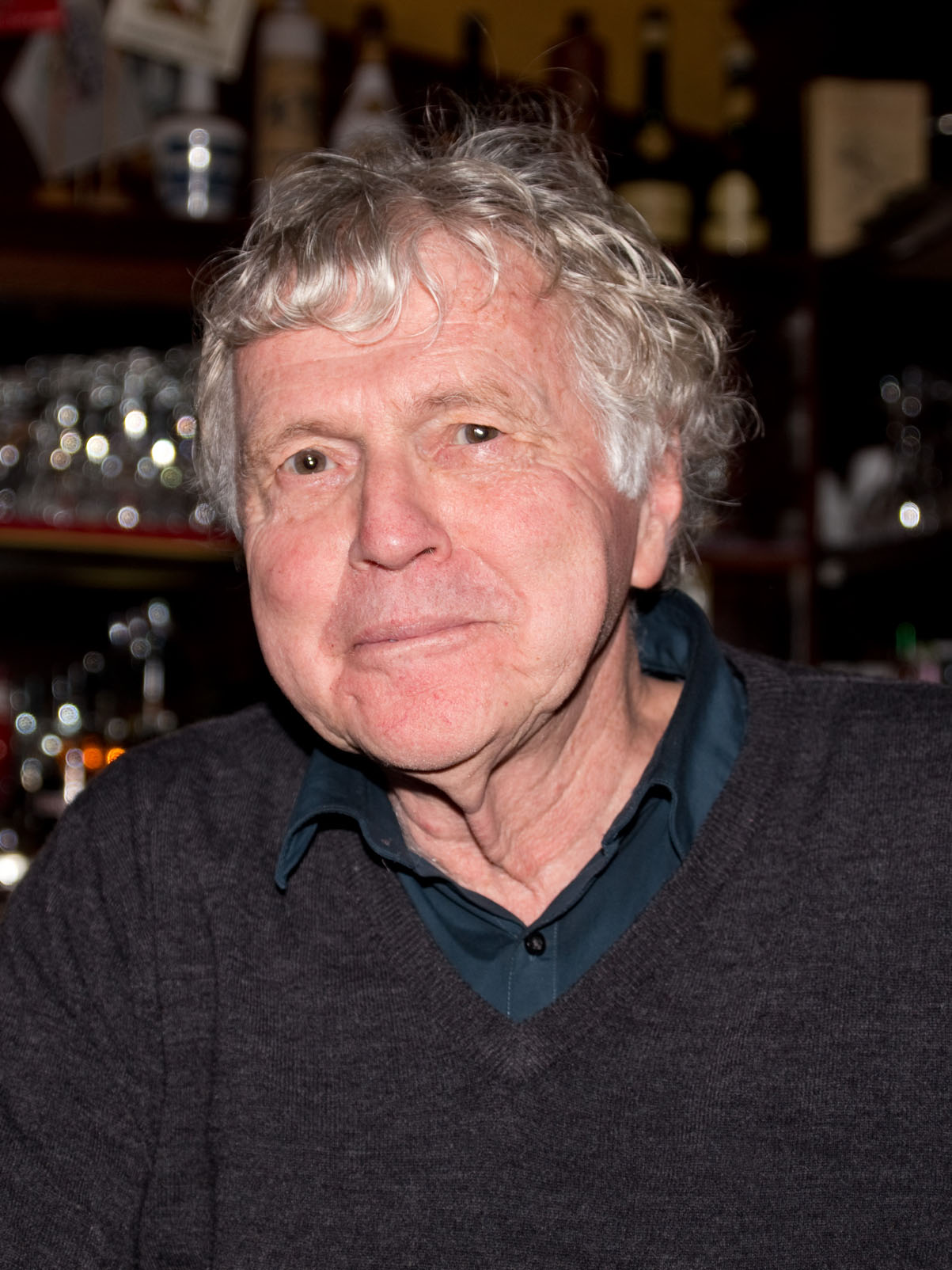
Anton van Hooff

=== Chairs ===
Chairs of De Dageraad (1873–1876: Het Vrije Onderzoek), after 1957 De Vrije Gedachte.

- 1856–1864: Rudolf Charles d'Ablaing van Giessenburg
- 1864–1871: Hendrik H. Huisman
- 1871–1873: (activities of De Dageraad halted)
- 1873–1879(?): W.J. Scheurleer
- 1879–1888: Pieter Frowein
- 1889–1906: Hendrik de Vries
- 1907–1909: Pieter Frowein
- 1909–1917: Willem Havers
- 1917–1921: Jan Hoving
- 1921–1923: K. Stadhouder
- 1923–1938: Jan Hoving
- 1938–1940: Maarten van den Brink
- 1945–1948: Maarten van den Brink
- 1948–1950: Jan de Ronde
- 1951–1954: Martin Paulissen
- 1954–1959: Oene Noordenbos
- 1960–1980: Jan Gerard Rausch
- 1980–1996: Jan Vis
- 1996–2005: Roel Bor
- 2005–2009: Lex Hagenaars
- 2009–2015: Anton van Hooff
- 2015–2018: Fabian van Langevelde
- 2018–present: Stanley Bakker

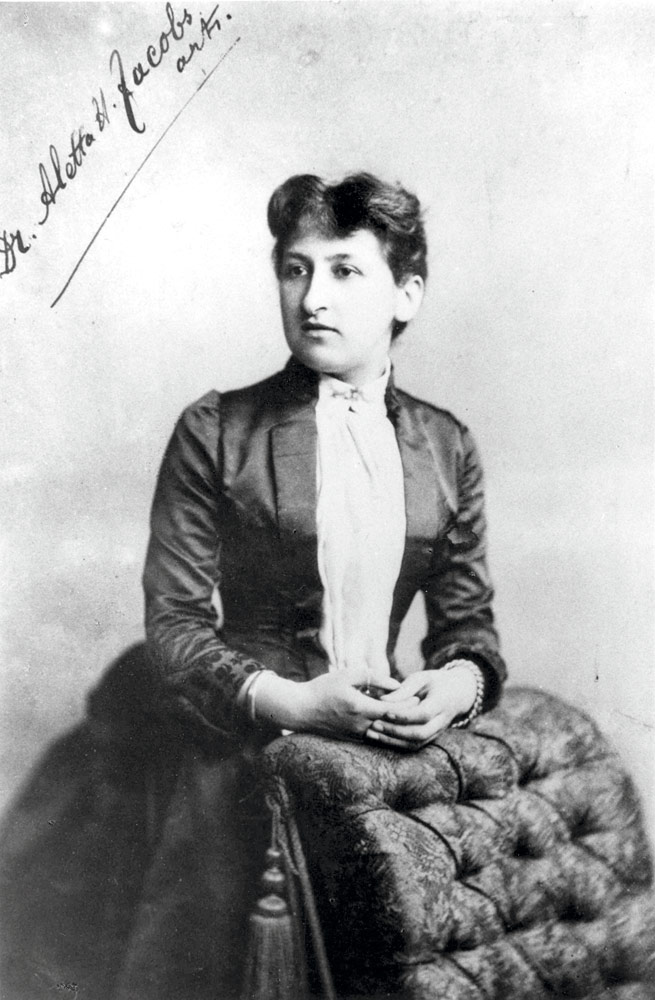
Aletta Jacobs

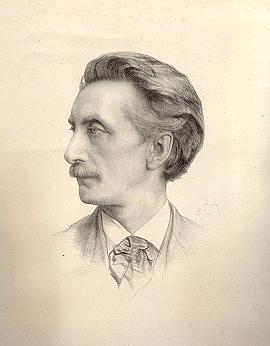
Multatuli

=== Others ===
- Floris van den Berg
- Gerard Bolland
- Charles Bradlaugh (honorary member since 1883)
- Paul Cliteur
- Anton Constandse
- Multatuli (honorary member since 1882)
- Wilhelmina Drucker
- Louis Fles
- Jan Fortuijn
- Bert Gasenbeek
- Adriaan Gerhard
- Elise Haighton (board member)
- Henriette Roland Holst
- Aletta Jacobs
- Gertrude Kapteyn-Muysken
- Jacob Moleschott (honorary member)
- Ferdinand Domela Nieuwenhuis
- Leo Polak
- Sem Presser
- Jan Romein
- Annie Romein-Verschoor
- Piet Spigt (board member)
- Titia van der Tuuk (board member)
- Johannes van Vloten

== Literature ==
- Koninklijk Bibliotheek Dossier de Dageraad
- IISG Archief De Dageraad
- Bert Gasenbeek; Hans Blom; Jo Nabuurs (2006). God noch autoriteit. Geschiedenis van de vrijdenkersbeweging in Nederland. Amersfoort: Boom. p. 336. ISBN 9085063582.
- Kuijlman, Wouter (2005). Metamorfoze Vrijdenkers (doctoraalscriptie) (PDF). Utrecht: Universiteit voor Humanistiek. p. 82.
