= Party for Neighbourly Love, Freedom and Diversity =

Political party of the Netherlands

Party for Neighbourly Love, Freedom, and Diversity Partij voor Naastenliefde, Vrijheid en Diversiteit
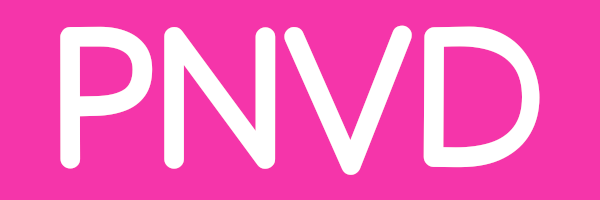
- Party logo (2020–2022)
- Leader: Marthijn Uittenbogaard (2006–2010); Nelson Maatman (2020–2022)
- Founders: Marthijn Uittenbogaard; Ad van den Berg; Norbert de Jonge
- Founded: 31 May 2006 (Note: The party was refounded by Nelson Maatman and Norbert de Jonge on 7 August 2020.)
- Dissolved: 2022 (Note: The original party was dissolved on 14 March 2010. The second iteration of the party dissolved in 2022, following the arrest of Maatman.)
- Membership (2006): 3
- Colours: Neon pink

Website
- pnvd.nl (archived)

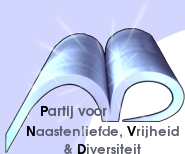
Party logo (2006–2010)

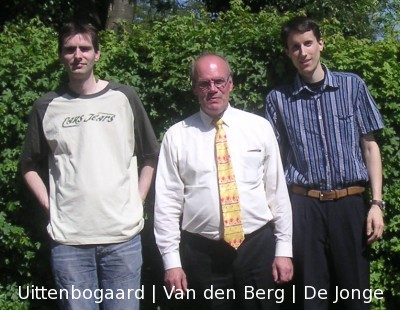
Founding and only public members of the original PNVD in 2006

The Party for Neighbourly Love, Freedom, and Diversity (Dutch: Partij voor Naastenliefde, Vrijheid en Diversiteit, PNVD), alternatively the Charity, Freedom, and Diversity Party, was a political party and a paedophile advocacy group in the Netherlands. It existed without parliamentary representation and had only three known members as of 2006. The PNVD was commonly referred to as the "paedo party" (pedopartij) by media outlets, due to its advocacy for the legalisation of child pornography and the lowering of the age of consent. The party was originally founded on 31 May 2006 by three self-described paedophile. Its motto was sapere aude, or "dare to know". Starting with the 2006 general election, the PNVD failed to contest electorally as it was unable to collect the 30 signatures from each of the 19 Dutch electoral regions it required to get on the ballot. On 14 March 2010, the party was dissolved.

The PNVD was momentarily revived on 7 August 2020, with Nelson Maatman as leader and original co-founder Norbert de Jonge as secretary-treasurer. Former party leader Marthijn Uittenbogaard indicated that he would not return to politics and was considering leaving the country. On 5 June 2022, authorities in Mexico City arrested Maatman on suspicion of human trafficking and possession of child pornography and a firearm, and the PNVD again dissolved.

== Platform ==
According to their official statement, the PNVD's platform aimed to maximise diversity and liberty. They proposed allowing individuals, from the age of 12, to vote, have sex, gamble, choose their place of residence, and use soft drugs. Hard drugs would be legal at 16, as that would be the new age of majority. They also intended to eliminate marriage in the law, permit public nudity anywhere in the country, make railway travel free, and institute a comprehensive animal rights platform. They were opposed to immigration and religious elementary schools.

=== Sexuality ===
The PNVD sought to have the legal age of consent lowered to 12, and, in the long run, eliminated (except in dependent or intrafamilial relationships). They reason that only "coerced" or "dangerous" sexual activity should be punished. They also aimed to equalise the legal age where one can perform in pornography with the legal age of consent. Prostitution would be legal at the age of 16. The PNVD wanted to legalise private use of child pornography (calling outlawing thereof "censorship" in the platform) and allow non-violent pornography to be screened on daytime television. Their platform also included legalisation of humans engaging in sex with other animals.

Treasurer Van den Berg claimed that, "Rearing is also about introducing children to sex". Because of their controversial viewpoints on children and sexuality, they were often called the "paedo-party" by the people and in the media.

Also, the party's platform called for separate imprisonment facilities for sex offenders, arguing that the country would otherwise have indirect torture laws.

=== Animal rights ===
The PNVD ultimately aimed to establish a universal treaty guaranteeing all animals basic rights.

In addition, the party planned to heavily restrict animal testing and completely prohibit the consumption of meat and fish: they viewed the killing of animals, no matter what purpose it serves, as murder. Industries currently depending on the sale of animal meat would receive provisional financial support from the government. Hunting and fishing for sport would also be banned. The party also supported laws criminalising the "sexual maltreatment" of animals.

== Controversy and legal challenges ==
Many of the party's positions, particularly those involving children, were widely unpopular among the Dutch public. In a May 2006 opinion poll, 82% of respondents wanted the Dutch government to stop the party from competing in the elections. The anti-paedophile foundation "Soelaas" petitioned the courts to ban the party, but the judges ruled in the PNVD's favour. "The freedom of expression, the freedom of assembly and the freedom of association [...] should be seen as the foundations of the democratic rule of law and the PNVD is also entitled to these freedoms," the court said in a statement.

The party's ties to paedophile activism have drawn much attention: Uittenbogaard (who also starred in the controversial documentary Are All Men Pedophiles?) was earlier the treasurer of Vereniging Martijn, an organisation which advocates romantic and sexual relationships between adults and children, and all of its founders have identified as paedophiles. As of 2023, he is serving a ten-year prison sentence in Ecuador for the production of child pornography.

Former party treasurer Ad van den Berg was convicted in 1987 for a relationship with an eleven-year-old boy. He was fined and given a suspended prison sentence. The Dutch television show Netwerk monitored Van den Berg for three months and discovered that he still had an underage boyfriend. Van den Berg passed away in early 2023, aged 78.

In June 2006, Norbert de Jonge was expelled from his special education course at the Radboud University Nijmegen, owing to his involvement with the party and identification as a paedophile.

The party's name was abbreviated as NVD at its formation, but shortly thereafter, the security company NVD Beveiligingen sought a legal order to have the party change their initials, saying that the party using the same abbreviation violated their trademark and harmed their reputation. The challenge was successful, and the party changed its initials to PNVD.

== See also ==
- List of political parties in the Netherlands
- List of paedophile advocacy organisations
- Child pornography laws in the Netherlands
- Dutch Society for Sexual Reform
- Vereniging Martijn
- North American Man/Boy Love Association
- Edward Brongersma
- Frits Bernard
- Joop Wilhelmus
