= Ad van den Berg =

Ad van den Berg may refer to

- Adrian Vandenberg, Dutch guitarist for Vandenberg and Whitesnake
- Ad van den Berg, Dutch politician for the Party for Neighbourly Love, Freedom and Diversity and chairman of Vereniging Martijn
