= Haighton (surname) =

Haighton is a surname. Notable people with the name include:

- Alfred Haighton (1896–1943), Dutch fascist politician and businessman
- Elise Haighton (1841–1911), Dutch feminist and free thinker
- John Haighton (c.1755–1823), English physician and physiologist

== See also ==
- Haighton, a civil parish in Lancashire, England
