= Multiculturalism in the Netherlands =

Multiculturalism in the Netherlands began with major increases in immigration during the 1950s and 1960s. As a consequence, an official national policy of multiculturalism was adopted in the early 1980s. This policy subsequently gave way to more assimilationist policies in the 1990s and post-electoral surveys uniformly showed from 1994 onwards that a majority preferred that immigrants assimilated rather than retained the culture of their country of origin. Even though the general acceptance of immigrants increased, opinion polls from the early 1980s and after showed that many were critical of immigration. Following the murders of Pim Fortuyn (in 2002) and Theo van Gogh (in 2004) the political debate on the role of multiculturalism in the Netherlands reached new heights.

Lord Sacks, Chief Rabbi of the United Hebrew Congregations of the Commonwealth, distinguishes between tolerance and multiculturalism, and says that the Netherlands is a tolerant, rather than multicultural, society.

== Government policy ==
After the Second World War, an immigration took place of guest workers and migrants from the former colonies. There was low pressure to culturally assimilate, it was easy to gain citizenship and government agencies translated documents and services for immigrants who lacked Dutch language skills. Until the 1970s it was generally assumed that immigrants, especially guest workers, would eventually return to their countries of origin. After the Afrikaanderwijk riots the Rotterdam municipality adopted a 5% policy: people of Mediterranean, Surinamese and Antillean background should not exceed 5% of a neighbourhood population. In 1974, the Council of State nullified this decision.

Multiculturalism was adopted as a government policy by the Netherlands in the early 1980s, largely from a conviction that a quick assimilation of Muslim immigrants was impossible, and to stimulate remigration. In 1983 an "Ethnic Minorities Policy" was adopted.

The Second Oil Crisis led to a collapse of Dutch industrial labour and caused massive unemployment for the former "guest workers", who were not easily integrated into the newly developing postindustrial society. Dutch low-skilled labour as a fraction of the total workforce declined from 18% to 2% between 1979 and 1985, disproportionally affecting immigrants. State programs to rectify the situation were ineffective during the 1980s. The economic boom of the 1990s improved the situation. The unemployment rate of Moroccans, the most disadvantaged large immigrant group, declined from 50% to 10% between 1989 and 2001. In the post-1998 period government policies have become stricter and while previous integration policies furthered diversity, diversity now was perceived to obstruct integration into Dutch society.

The Netherlands in the early twenty-first century attracted international attention for the extent to which it reversed its previous multiculturalist policies, and its policies on cultural assimilation have been described as the toughest in Europe.

== Immigration and opposition to it ==
After the Second World War there were three successive waves of major immigration into the Netherlands. The first originated in the former Dutch colony of the Dutch East Indies (Indonesia) in the 1940s and 1950s. The second wave originated in Southern Europe (Greece, Italy, Spain, and Portugal) and from Turkey and Morocco during the 1960s and 1970s, coinciding with a wave from the Dutch colony of Suriname. The second wave was largely in the form of labour migration of workers recruited by the Dutch state, a policy ended in 1974. The third wave consisted of asylum seekers from different countries such as Iran, Iraq, and former Yugoslavia since the mid-1990s. The waves should be discerned from a general high and rising 'background' level of labour immigration from European countries, that accounts for the majority of people settling in the Netherlands.

The anti-immigration Centrumpartij had a limited electoral success since 1982, but its leader Hans Janmaat was ostracized, and fined for his discriminatory statements and promotion of ethnic cleansing.

By 2007, nearly 20% of the country's population were either (western and non-western) immigrants or children of immigrant parents.

== Demand for unskilled labour ==
The multicultural policy consensus down-played negative aspects of the presence of immigrant cultural communities, and stressed beneficial effects. Immigration was not subject to limits on cultural grounds: in practice, the immigration rate was determined by demand for unskilled labour, and later by migration of family members. The total Western and non-Western immigration and re-migration resulted in an immigrant population of about 3.5 million. In 2014, about two million inhabitants were non-Western immigrants (1,095,731) or the direct descendants of these. Net immigration and the initially higher birth rate of the immigrant communities, have transformed the Dutch population structure since the 1950s. In 2006 one fifth of the population was of non-Dutch ethnicity, about half of which were of non-Western origin. Immigration transformed Dutch cities especially: in Amsterdam, 55% of young people are of non-Western origin (mainly Moroccan, Surinamese and Turkish).

== Intellectual critique ==
In 1999, the legal philosopher Paul Cliteur attacked multiculturalism in his book The Philosophy of Human Rights. Cliteur rejects all political correctness on the issue: Western culture, the Rechtsstaat (rule of law), and human rights are superior to non-Western culture and values. They are the product of the Enlightenment. Cliteur sees non-Western cultures not as merely different but as anachronistic. He sees multiculturalism primarily as an unacceptable ideology of cultural relativism, which would lead to acceptance of barbaric practices, including those brought to the Western World by immigrants. Cliteur lists infanticide, torture, slavery, oppression of women, homophobia, racism, anti-Semitism, gangs, female genital cutting, discrimination by immigrants, suttee, and the death penalty. Cliteur compares multiculturalism to the moral acceptance of Auschwitz, Joseph Stalin, Pol Pot and the Ku Klux Klan.

Cliteur's 1999 work is indicative of the polemic tone of the debate in the following years. Most of the "immigrant barbarities" which he names are regularly cited by opponents of multiculturalism, sometimes as a reductio ad absurdum, but also as supposed factual practices of immigrants in the Netherlands.

In 2000, Paul Scheffer — a member of the Labour Party and subsequently a professor of urban studies — published his essay "The multicultural tragedy", an essay critical of both immigration and multiculturalism. Scheffer is a committed supporter of the nation-state, assuming that homogeneity and integration are necessary for a society: the presence of immigrants undermines this. A society does have a finite "absorptive capacity" for those from other cultures, he says, but this has been exceeded in the Netherlands. His position more specifically included the following points:

- a huge influx of people from diverse cultural backgrounds, in combination with multiculturalism, resulted in spontaneous ethnic segregation.
- the Netherlands must take its own language, culture, and history seriously, and immigrants must learn this language, culture, and history.
- multiculturalism and immigration led to adaptation problems such as school drop-out, unemployment, and high crime rates.
- a society which does not respect itself (its Dutch national identity) also has no value for immigrants
- multicultural policy ignored Dutch language acquisition, which should be a priority in education.
- Islam has not yet reformed itself, and does not accept the separation of church and state.
- immigrants must always lose their own culture - that is the price of immigration, a "brutal bargain" (quote from Norman Podhoretz).

Scheffer approvingly quoted the Dutch sociologist J.A.A. van Doorn as saying that the presence of immigrants in the Netherlands had "put the evolutionary clock back" by fifty years or more. The high immigration rate and the lack of integration threatened society, and must be stopped. His essay had a great impact, and led to what became known as the "integration debate". As in the essay, this was not simply about multiculturalism, but about immigration, Islam, the national identity, and national unity.

In 2002, the legal scholar Afshin Ellian, a refugee from Iran, advocated a monocultural Rechtsstaat in the Netherlands. A liberal democracy cannot be multicultural, he argued, because multiculturalism is an ideology and a democracy has no official ideology. What is more, according to Ellian, a democracy must be monolingual. The Dutch language is the language of the constitution, and therefore it must be the only public language — all others must be limited to the private sphere. The Netherlands, he wrote, had been taken hostage by the left-wing multiculturalists, and their policy was in turn determined by the Islamic conservatives. Ellian stated that there were 800 000 Muslims in the country, with 450 mosques, and that the Netherlands had legalised the "feudal system of the Islamic Empire". Democracy and the rule of law could only be restored by abolishing multiculturalism.

== Political reaction ==
Overturning the political stability of the 1990s, Fortuyn in early 2002 swiftly gained popularity. He was assassinated during the 2002 Dutch national election campaign by a militant animal rights activist Volkert van der Graaf, who claimed in court to murdering Fortuyn to stop him exploiting Muslims as "scapegoats" and targeting "the weak parts of society to score points" in seeking political power. His supporters saw Fortuyn as a national martyr in the struggle against islamisation.

Following Fortuyn's death, open rejection of multiculturalism and immigration ceased to be taboo. The new cabinet, under premier Jan-Peter Balkenende instituted a hard-line assimilation policy, enforced by fines and deportation, accompanied by far tighter controls on immigration and asylum. Many former supporters of multiculturalism shifted their position. In a 2006 manifesto "one country, one society", several of them launched an appeal for a more cohesive society by "unity in diversity", while deploring what they saw as increasing intolerance. Piet Hein Donner, the Ministry of the Interior and Kingdom Relations in the Rutte cabinet, said that "Dutch culture, norms and values must be dominant".

== Feminist opposition ==
The most prominent figure in the post-Fortuyn debate of the issue was Ayaan Hirsi Ali. Her first criticisms of multiculturalism paralleled those of the early liberal-feminist critics in the United States — the emphasis on group identity and group rights diminished individual liberty for those within the minorities, and especially for women. As time went on, her criticism was increasingly directed at Islam itself, and its incompatibility with democracy and Western culture. By 2004 she was the most prominent critic of Islam in Europe. She scripted a short film on Islamic oppression of women, featuring texts from the Quran on the naked bodies of women; its director Theo van Gogh was later assassinated by Mohammed Bouyeri. Threatened with death and heavily guarded, she spent most of her time in the United States, and moved to Washington in 2006 to work for the American Enterprise Institute. In 2006, she also expressed support for the Eurabia thesis — that mainstream politicians are conspiring to fully Islamise Europe —, and that its non-Muslim inhabitants will be reduced to dhimmitude. In a speech for CORE in January 2007, she declared that Western culture was overwhelmingly superior:

... my dream is that those lucky enough to be born into a culture of "ladies first" will let go of the myth that all cultures are equal. Human beings are equal; cultures are not.

== Patriotic measures ==
Some of the measures, especially those seeking to promote patriotic identification, include the following: In the Netherlands, the naturalisation ceremony includes a gift symbolising national unity. In Gouda it is a candle in the national colours red-white-blue, in Amsterdam a Delftware potato with floral motifs.

There are proposed measures which go much further than these. They typically, but not always, come from firmly right-wing parties and their supporters. The proposals illustrate the "post-multicultural" climate: a loyalty oath for all citizens, legal prohibition of public use of a foreign language, cessation of all immigration, expulsion of criminal, unemployed or not integrated immigrants, withdrawal from the European Union, a compulsory (non-military) national service; a ban on the construction of mosques, closure of all Islamic schools, a closure of all mosques, or a complete ban on Islam.

The Party for Freedom of anti-immigration politician Geert Wilders opposed the nomination of two ministers because they had dual nationality. The party subsequently proposed a motion of no confidence in both ministers. The party doubts their loyalty to the Netherlands, in cases of conflict with their countries of origin (Turkey and Morocco). According to an opinion poll more than half the population agrees with the party. Opinion is sharply divided by political party: 96% of Wilders' voters agree with him, and 93% of GreenLeft voters disagree.

== Likelihood of polarization ==
Although such policies often have the stated aim of reviving national unity, one result has been an increased polarization. Muslims in Britain or the Netherlands hear that their culture is backward, that Western culture is superior, and that they are obliged to adopt it. In turn, defensive reactions include an increased self-identification as "Muslims", and adoption of Islamic dress by women and "Islamic" beards by men. Part of the Muslim minority is now hostile to the society they live in, and sympathetic to terrorism. In Amsterdam's secondary schools, about half of the Moroccan minority does not identify with the Netherlands: they see their identity as "Muslim", and regularly express anti-Western views.

== New terms for minorities ==
New terms for minorities of immigrant descent have come into use: the term allochtoon in Flanders (Dutch speaking part of Belgium) and the Netherlands. Both are applied regardless of citizenship. The renewed emphasis on historical culture places higher demands on cultural assimilation; immigrants may be encouraged to learn, for example, to identify and describe cultural heroes and historical figures such as Thorbecke and William of Orange.

== See also ==
- Criticism of multiculturalism
