= Nelson Maatman =

Dutch pro-pedophilia activist

Nelson Maatman is a Dutch activist who became known for his statements about pedophilia. A self-described pedophile, Maatman became known for his public writing and media appearances on the subject of pedophilia, initially under a pseudonym but later under his own name. He also led the second iteration of the Party for Neighbourly Love, Freedom and Diversity from 2020. After being arrested on suspicion of possessing child pornography and spreading the ideology of the banned pro-pedophile Vereniging Martijn, Maatman fled to Mexico, where he applied for asylum. In 2022, Maatman was arrested a second time.

== Initial publicity ==
Maatman began writing publicly under the pseudonym Mark Lucius. He wrote guest columns; including in 2015 in de Volkskrant, and in 2016 in De Vrijdenker, was interviewed in 2015 by Winq, and gave a guest lecture in 2015 to the International Federation of Medical Students' Associations at the University of Amsterdam. Maatman was a guest afterwards on the television program Je zal het maar zijn. In the program, Maatman's identity was hidden, but he was still recognized by his colleagues at the Federation of Dutch Trade Unions (FNV), where he gave guest lectures to young people. The FNV subsequently fired him, a decision which was later upheld by the Netherlands Institute for Human Rights.

== Activism ==
Maatman became known nationally through his hashtag #PedoPride, and his "Children's Liberation Front", named after a segment in the Dutch children's program Villa Achterwerk. At the end of 2019, he initially called off a planned flyer campaign at Pride Amsterdam, deciding to hand out flyers at Rotterdam Pride instead. Maatman later did attend Pride Amsterdam, where the police confiscated his flyers. The leadership of Pride Amsterdam had refused to give him a spot at the event, about which Maatman filed a complaint with the Netherlands Institute for Human Rights, which held it did not have jurisdiction. Platform Pedofilie.nl, which campaigns against pedophilia, subsequently removed him from its chat group.

== House search and detention ==
In January 2020, a search was conducted at a home belonging to Maatman, as part of a criminal investigation into the possible continuation of the banned pro-pedophile association Vereniging Martijn. While Maatman was never a member of Vereniging Martijn, according to the Dutch Public Prosecution Service (OM), he participated in spreading its ideology.

On 13 February 2020, during a high-profile episode of the television program Danny op straat, Maatman announced his intention to found a political party that would legalize sex with children. The broadcast led to a public disturbance at his home, and less than a week later Maatman was arrested on suspicion of possessing child pornography. According to the OM, more than 10,000 child pornographic images were found in his possession. Maatman said he did not possess child pornography, and his lawyer stated that the images were not child pornography.

During the Danny op straat episode, Maatman is seen preparing to give a guest lecture at the University of Amsterdam. After the broadcast, the director of the Board of Social Sciences stated: "We were not sufficiently aware of his activist attitude and statements. That is wrong, a major mistake. Had we looked into that more closely, we certainly would not have invited him. We are very sorry." The Algemeen Dagblad quoted a student who called the apology "a breakdown of the university's integrity." The lecturer who invited Maatman did not regret the decision, but would not invite him again.

Initially, housing association Centrada did not intend to evict Maatman from his flat, calling him "a good tenant." Maatman was also willing to leave his apartment if he were helped in finding a new home. During his pre-trial detention, Centrada nevertheless attempted to evict Maatman from his home. In March 2020, a subdistrict court judge ruled that he could not be evicted from his home for the time being

== Mexico ==
In June 2020, Maatman was granted conditional release pending his trials. In August 2020, as chairman and one of the party's co-founders, he presented the new party manifesto of the Party for Neighbourly Love, Freedom and Diversity (PNVD). A petition against his party gained hundreds of thousands of signatures.

According to Maatman, he was tortured during his detention, stating that the Netherlands no longer respected free speech, and that in his opinion there were parallels between the situation of Jews during the Holocaust and that of pedophiles. Maatman then fled the Netherlands and applied for asylum in Mexico. In mid-2021, in Propria Cures, he cited "illegal persecutions and life-threatening violence" as the reason for his flight. In June 2022, Maatman was arrested in Mexico City on suspicion of the possession of child pornography and illegal firearms. His arrest was made possible in part by the Foundation Free a Girl and Operation Underground Railroad. The Dutch government then submitted a request to Mexico for Maatman's extradition.
