= Paul Scheffer =

Dutch author and professor

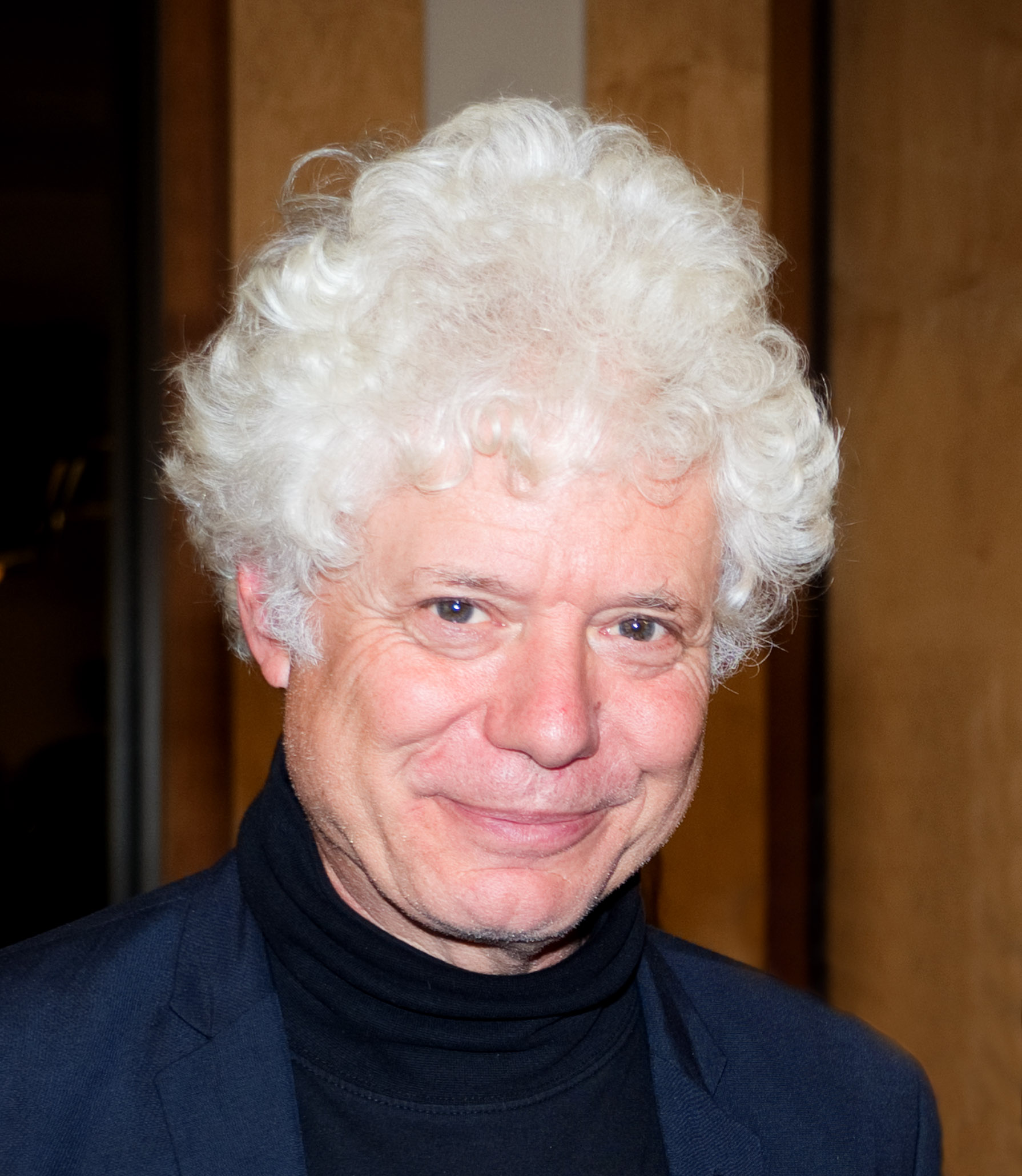
Paul Scheffer, 2015.

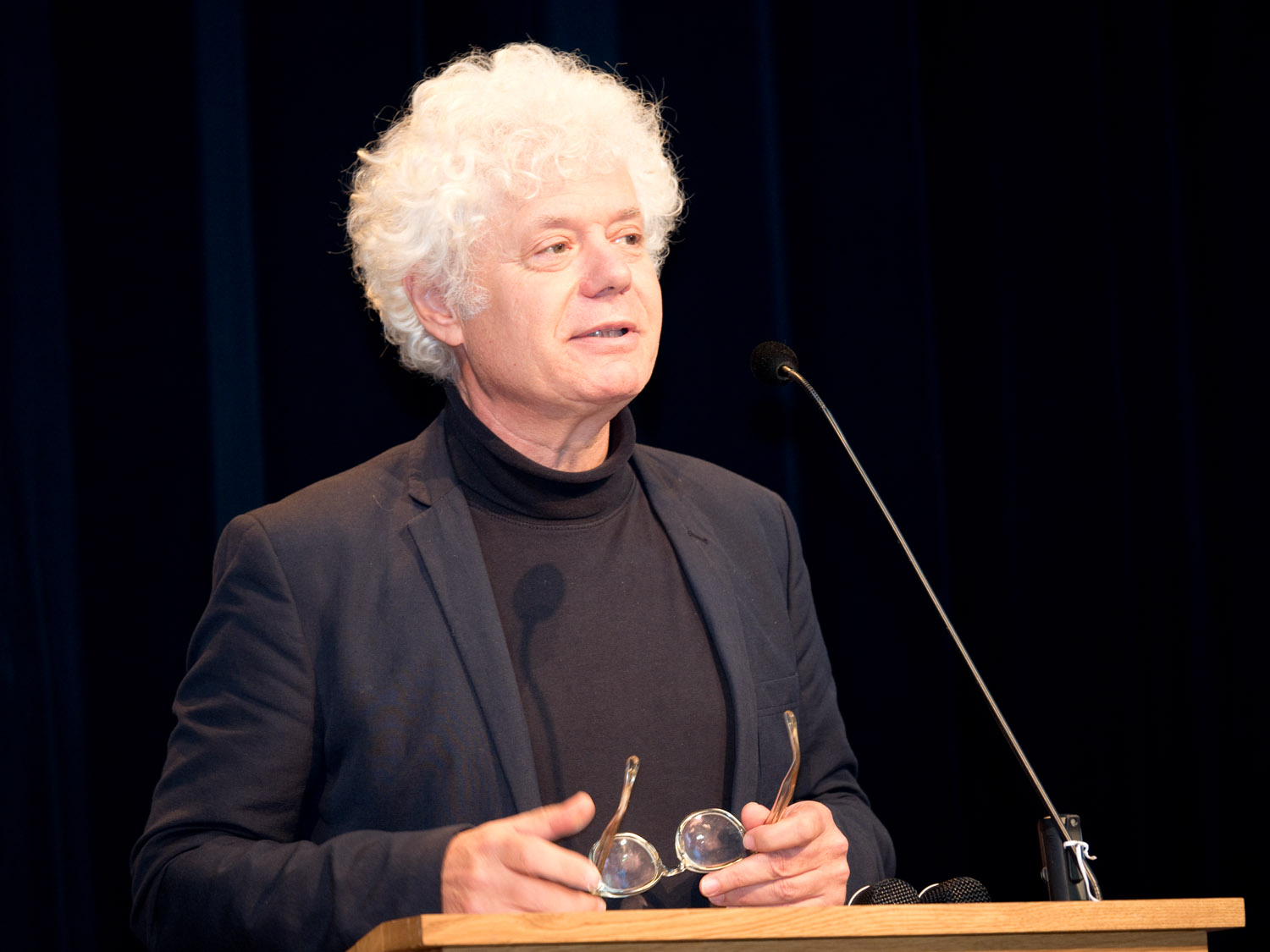
Scheffer giving the Anton Constandse Lecture in 2015.

Paul Scheffer (Nijmegen, 3 September 1954) is a Dutch author. He was a professor at the Universiteit van Amsterdam between 2003 and 2011; currently he is professor of European studies at Tilburg University. Paul Scheffer is also a prominent member of the Dutch Labour Party.

== Bibliography ==
In 2000, he wrote an essay titled Het multiculturele drama (approximate translation: "The Multicultural Drama”), which was highly influential in shaping the debate on multiculturalism and immigration in the Netherlands.

His 2007 book, Het land van aankomst, was published in English in 2011 as "Immigrant Nations", and deals with the overlaps between multiculturalism in the Netherlands and immigration to the Netherlands. The central idea of this book is that "immigration always has been and is a process of alienation for both the newcomers and the natives."
