= Dutch Society for Sexual Reform =

Dutch sexual advocacy organization

- Formation: 1946
- Purpose: To further the sexual emancipation of individuals and to improve sexual conditions in society
- Region served: Netherlands
- Official language: Dutch
- Website: www.sexualskills.co.uk (English); www.nvsh.nl (Dutch)

The Dutch Society for Sexual Reform (Dutch: Nederlandse Vereniging voor Seksuele Hervorming, NVSH) is a Dutch sexual advocacy organization. The NVSH was founded in 1946, as the successor of the Dutch Neo-Malthusian League, a birth control organisation which opened the first birth control clinic in the world in 1881, in Amsterdam. The NVSH was once the only source of condoms in the Netherlands.

Up to the 1960s, a great deal of energy went into building up the organisation, which in its heyday ran over 60 birth control clinics in The Netherlands. Much work in those early years was put into improving the quality and availability of contraceptives (condom, diaphragm and spermicidal jelly). In 1966 the society reached a membership of 220,000. Contraceptives were officially legalized in 1970, after which membership began to fall. In 2002, the number was about 1500 and late 2008 about 700.

The organization's membership peaked at more than 200,000 in the 1960s. The NVSH has opposed, since the 1960s, the criminalization of homosexuality, abortion, pornography, prostitution, and other sexual restrictions. It has worked and collaborated with COC on a number of projects. In 1979, it sent a petition to the Dutch Parliament calling for the abolition of laws that criminalized sexual activities between adults and children. The petition was supported by multiple academics, celebrities, politicians and the General Teachers Association.

== See also ==
- Party for Neighbourly Love, Freedom and Diversity
- Vereniging Martijn
- Edward Brongersma
- Frits Bernard
- Joop Wilhelmus
