= Joop Wilhelmus =

Dutch pornographer and entrepreneur

- Born: January 7, 1943; Dordrecht
- Died: September 9, 1994 (aged 51); Dordrecht
- Occupations: Pornographer, entrepreneur
- Years active: 1968–1987
- Known for: Chick, Lolita
- Criminal charge: Child sexual abuse (incest)
- Criminal penalty: Imprisonment for 4 years
- Criminal status: Convicted in 1992, released in 1994
- Children: Four

Johannes Cornelis Christiaan "Joop" Wilhelmus (7 January 1943 – c. 9 September 1994) was a Dutch pornographer and entrepreneur, known for co-founding and publishing pornographic magazine Chick, founding and publishing child pornography magazine Lolita.

== Personal life ==
Wilhelmus received an upbringing based on radical left principles. He was a teacher and started his career by publishing Provo-like journals. Wilhelmus advocated complete sexual freedom, and became a well-known advocate of free sexual morality. Together with Peter Johannes Muller (of Candy magazine), Wilhelmus broke the taboo of sexuality in the Netherlands. Wilhelmus also aggressively attacked women's shelters for abused women, and published the confidential addresses of these shelters. Wilhelmus started sex shops and a 'stimulus society' in a cellar in Utrecht that allowed couples to engage in partner swapping. Wilhelmus was married and had four children; three daughters and one son. Wilhelmus' wife shared his philosophy regarding adult and child sexuality.

== Chick ==
Chick, self-styled "sex magazine for the worker", was an explicit sex journal that started in 1968. Chick was founded by Wilhelmus, its editor-in-chief, and Jan Wenderhold, its sales manager. It also published dating personals that were about sex and not about love. Chick's initial print run of 5,000 rose to 18,000 by the second half of 1968, and according to Wilhelmus, the magazine's circulation was 140,000 in 1971. In the seventies, Wilhelmus argued in Chick that sex with children was part of the sexual liberation. In 1970, the publication of Chick resulted in the Dutch "Chick-arrest" by the Supreme Court of the Netherlands, which in turn led to the new Dutch moral law of 1971 that no longer criminally sanctioned pornography. After a conflict between founders Wilhelmus and Wenderhold, two versions of Chick co-existed, Chick/Dordrecht and Chick/Amsterdam, until Wenderhold eventually bought the Dordrecht version.

== Lolita ==
Wilhelmus was also the founder and publisher of child pornography magazine Lolita. Lolita was first published circa 1970. Besides pornography it also featured a contact service for its readers through classified ads. Wilhelmus encouraged readers to provide new child pornography images so as to ensure his magazine's survival. A gift magazine was given in exchange for each new child photograph, and the sum of $350 was offered in the magazine if Wilhelmus could take the photographs himself. While Wilhelmus was arrested for publishing Lolita in January 1971, he was released immediately after the interrogation, and was never prosecuted for publishing the magazine. In 1973, he gave a lecture at a Roman Catholic training institute for working girls in Rotterdam, at the invitation of the school board, and Lex van Naerssen of Utrecht University invited Wilhelmus as a visiting scholar, which led to parliamentary questions in the Dutch House of Representatives. In June 1975, Wilhelmus partook in a TV broadcast of the NCRV-program Hier en Nu, where he explained how normal sex with children was to him. In 1986, the PSI subcommittee of the U.S. Senate Committee on Governmental Affairs called Lolita "the most notorious of the foreign commercial child pornography publications". The magazine reached issue 55 in 1984, and was eventually closed down by Dutch authorities in 1987, seventeen years after its conception. According to Wilhelmus, at the peak of its popularity, Lolita's circulation was 25,000. Lolita became an almost universal brand name for child pornography. In an interview with the VPRO, Dik Brummel of the NVSH declared that he had bought some issues of Lolita and considered them to be "historical documents".

== Later years and death ==
Wilhelmus became a millionaire, but as "one of the most successful" and "one of the most notorious" publishers of child pornography, he ran into great opposition when the social climate started changing and he became more and more isolated. The Dutch authorities arrested him every time he tried to leave the country. In 1992, Wilhelmus was sentenced to four years' imprisonment for having sex with his then twelve-year-old daughter. Wilhelmus claimed to be innocent, and his oldest daughter started a petition to free her father and asked a doctor to examine the daughter who was supposedly abused. This doctor issued a medical certificate that stated the daughter could not have had sexual intercourse and that her hymen was intact. Two years later, Wilhelmus was released early because of good behavior. The night after his release, Wilhelmus drowned in the water of the Voorstraathaven in downtown Dordrecht. According to the police, his death was neither suicide nor murder, but Wilhelmus was drunk and his death an accident.

== See also ==
- Child pornography laws in the Netherlands
- Dutch Society for Sexual Reform
- Party for Neighbourly Love, Freedom and Diversity
- Vereniging Martijn
- Edward Brongersma
- Frits Bernard
