= Karin Spaink =

Dutch journalist, writer and feminist (1957–2026)

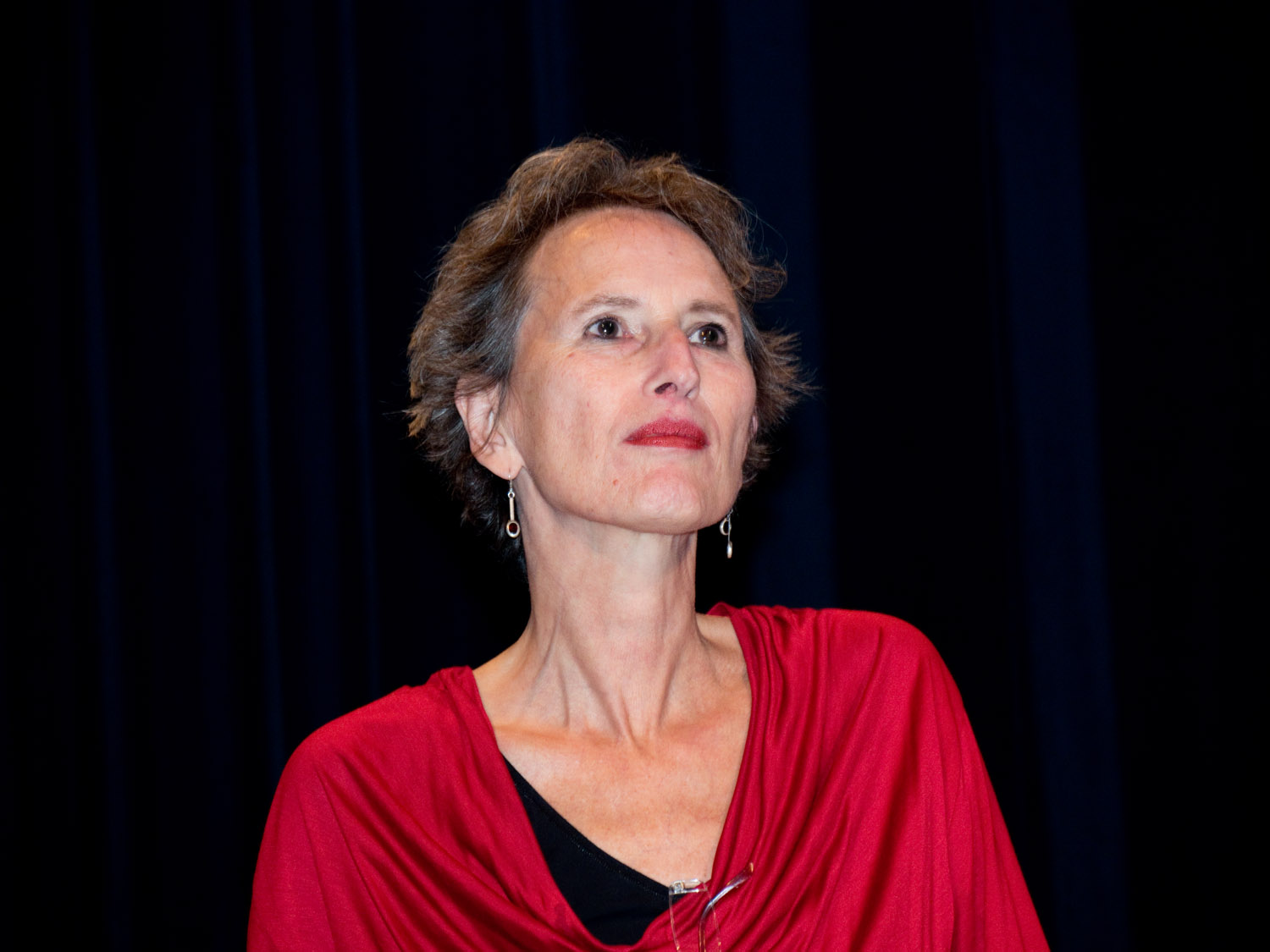
- Spaink in 2015
- Born: 20 December 1957; Amsterdam, Netherlands
- Died: 8 May 2026 (aged 68)
- Occupations: Journalist, writer
- Karin Spaink's voice Recorded October 2015

Karin Spaink (20 December 1957 – 8 May 2026) was a Dutch journalist, writer and feminist. She was also a free speech advocate and social critic, who criticized New Age writers and the Church of Scientology.

== Life and career ==
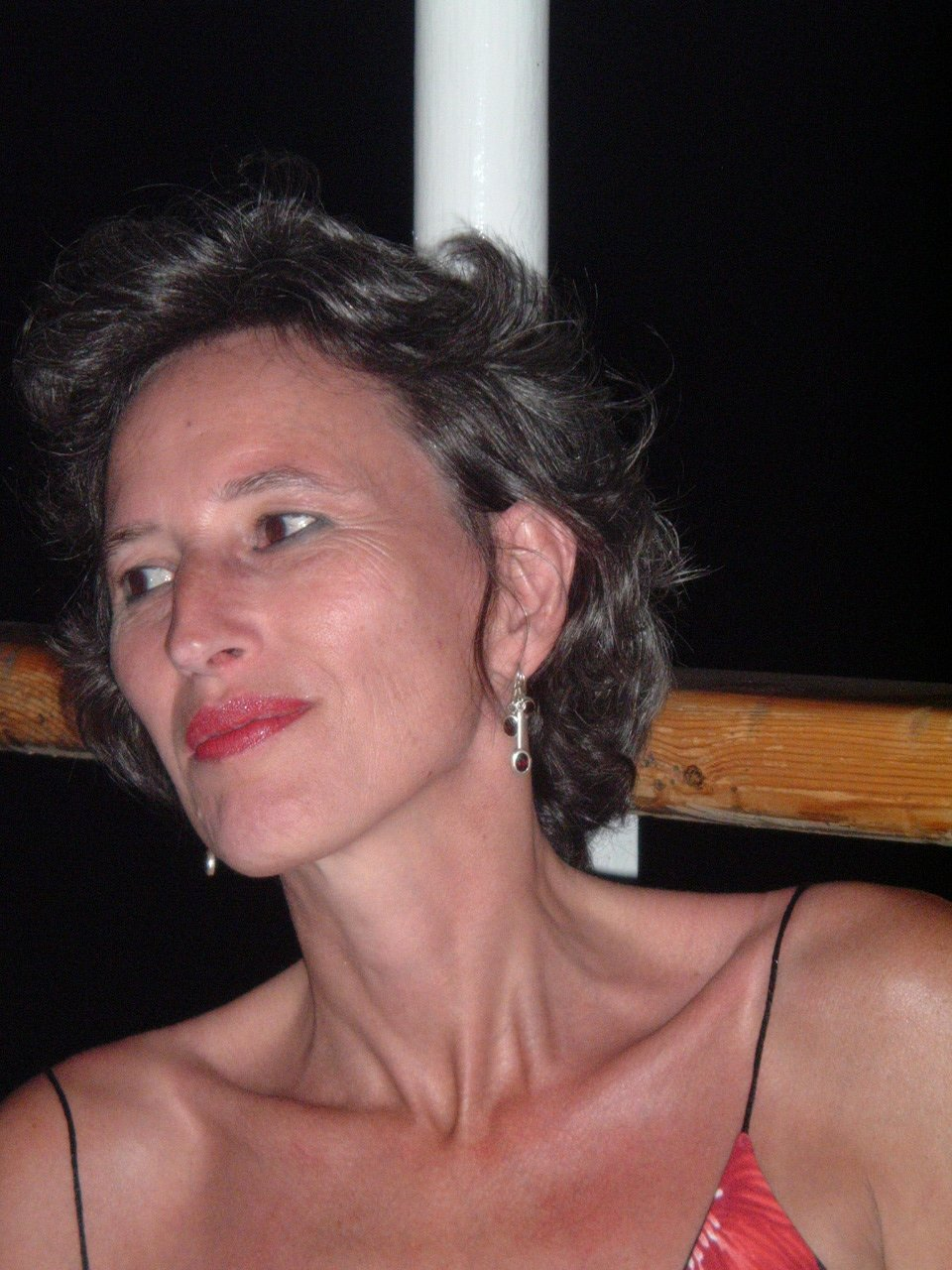
Spaink in 2006

Spaink was born in Amsterdam and trained as a secondary school teacher from 1975 to 1981, specialising in English. From 1981 to 1984 she studied sociology at the University of Amsterdam. She was diagnosed with multiple sclerosis in 1986.

In 1986 and 1987 she trained as a computer programmer, at Volmac and Fokker. In this period she worked for the Pacifist Socialist Party. From 1988 until 1990 she worked for Fokker. In 2018 she became the editor-in-chief of Follow the Money. She wrote a regular column for Het Parool (1992 to 2022) and previously wrote for De Groene Amsterdammer (1994-2003).

From 2001 to 2004 she was an external adviser for the Freedom of the Media bureau (FOM) of the Organization for Security and Co-operation in Europe (OSCE), advising them on freedom of speech and the internet.

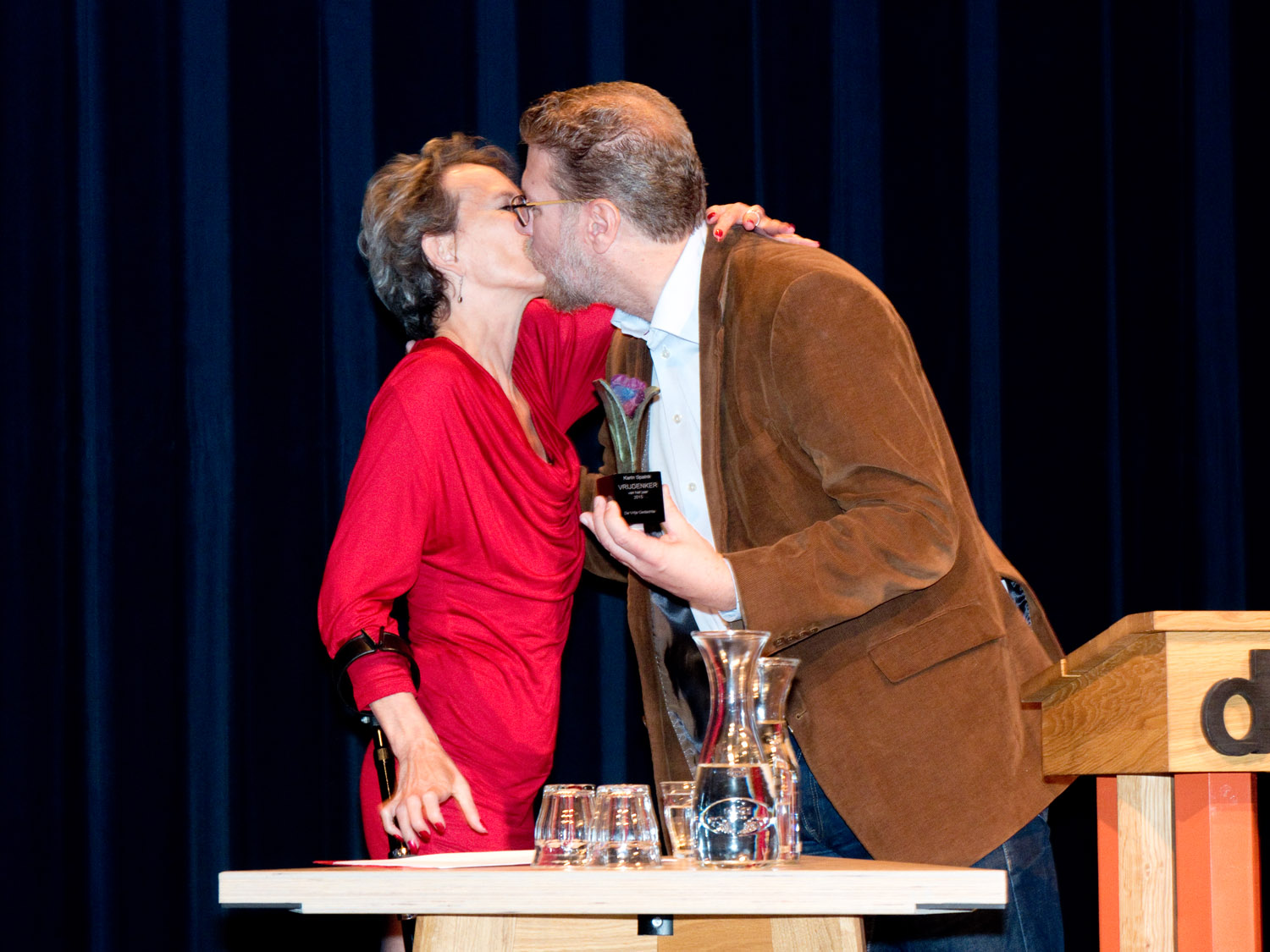
De Vrije Gedachte chair Van Langevelde honours Spaink as Freethinker of 2015

In 2005 she became the chief editor of a new book series, The Next Ten Years. The first book in the series, which dealt with electronic patient records (EPR) and the accompanying hack of two major hospitals, led to a debate in parliament. A few months later, the national introduction of EPR's was stalled by the Department of Health, citing Spaink's research. In that same year, she embarked on writing the history of XS4ALL and Hack-Tic.

In 2013 she joined the Committee of Recommendation of the Dutch whistleblower foundation Publeaks, which on 9 September 2013 launched a whistleblowing initiative based on GlobaLeaks software.

In 2015, Spaink was named Freethinker of the Year by De Vrije Gedachte.

Spaink gave the 2018 Mosse Lecture, titled Tussen Grewel en Fortuyn: Identiteit, herzuiling, privilege en verschil (Between Grewel and Fortuyn: Identity, re-pillarification, privilege and difference).

Spaink died on 8 May 2026, at the age of 68.

== Social criticism ==
Spaink was a free speech advocate and social critic. Some of her subjects are:

- New-age writers who assert all diseases are only a psychological phenomenon;
- The Church of Scientology, which sued her for more than ten years;
- Opposition to a U.S. court decision which took down an anti-abortion internet site that contained names, addresses, photos and personal data of abortion providers along with calls for violence against them (Spaink describes herself as pro-choice on the issue of abortion, but felt that freedom of speech should prevail);
- The right to inform people about methods of suicide and to discuss the danger or reliability of various methods.

=== Disputes with New Age proponents over physical ailments ===
Spaink first came into the national limelight by accusing such New Age writers as Louise Hay and Bernie Siegel of oversimplifying physical ailments by reducing them to a purely psychological phenomenon. Suffering from multiple sclerosis, she was insulted by the suggestion that her disease was nothing more than the result of her own lack of willingness to heal. (Compare Idealism with Materialism; see also New Thought Movement.)

Her essay Het strafbare lichaam ("The Penal Body") coined neologisms such as kwakdenken ("quack thinking") and orenmaffia ("mind mob") that even made it into the Dutch language dictionary. The latter term derived from the expression that something is "all between the ears," in other words, "all in the mind."

=== Scientology litigation against Spaink and XS4ALL ===
In 1995, the Church of Scientology began a legal campaign to remove what it asserted were copyright infringements and trade secrets from the Internet. Karin Spaink was one of many to put up pages containing the Fishman Affidavit in criticism of the church, and Scientology responded by suing Spaink, internet service provider XS4ALL, and 20 other ISPs in the Netherlands for copyright infringement, raiding the offices of XS4ALL to seize servers. Part of the Fishman Affidavit were documents that Fishman had asserted to be the official teachings of Scientology. The defendants responded by challenging the church to prove it was actually the copyright holder of the disputed documents.

The church allowed a Dutch notary to compare the church-copyrighted documents with the texts on Spaink's homepage. Through her lawyers, Karin Spaink received a copy and started rewriting her homepage, just a week away from the court date for handling the motion for summary judgement. Spaink replaced the contested documents with an analysis of the documents, quoting liberally, but not too liberally from them; Dutch copyright law does not have a fair-use provision, but allows quotation for purposes of scientific dissemination. A representative of the Church of Scientology used this occurrence to back up an assertion that the church had won the court case.

The hearing on the merits made compromises: the court in 1999 found that service providers do have a responsibility for documents that users put up on their web site. However, any claims that Karin Spaink was breaking the church's copyright were deemed unfounded, because Spaink had reworked her homepage as soon as she had discovered that the church indeed had valid claims to portions of the documents on that homepage. This implicitly meant that the scholarly study of the church's documents on Spaink's homepage was in fact legal according to the decision.

Court costs were divided equally between parties. In the Netherlands these usually run into (only) thousands of guilders; contrast this with the hundreds of thousands of dollars that American Scientology adversaries had to pay after losing their own, US-based court cases. This may be an indication of why Spaink could still fight the church, and why it is claimed by Scientology critics that the barrage of lawsuits brought on by the church is not making use of a legal right, but a form of harassment (barratry).

The Church of Scientology appealed this decision. A court date was originally planned for September 2002, but was postponed several times. Finally in September 2003, the court decided in favor of Spaink and the internet service providers on all points. The three judges found that Spaink and the providers might indeed have broken Dutch copyright law; quotation is not allowed of works that have not been previously published, and whether or not the release as evidence in a US court case counts as 'publication' was considered dubious. However, the judges felt that they did not have to rule on this subject, because European law states that quotation is legal in cases where the quotation serves a higher goal. The court held it proven that Scientology is an organisation that tries to undermine democracy, and ruled that Spaink had the right to quote the Church in her exposé.

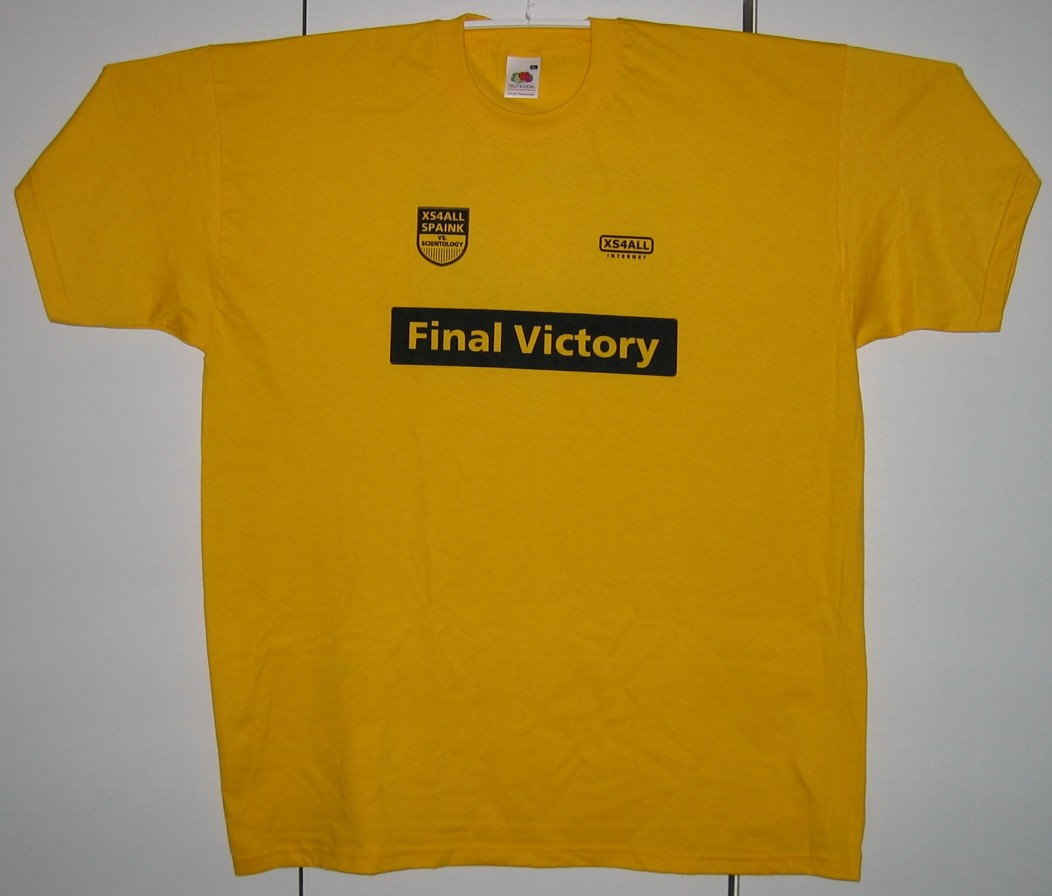
T-shirt commemorating the legal victory against Scientology

The Church appealed again, this time to the Supreme Court of Netherlands. In July 2005, a few days before the court was expected to rule, Scientology withdrew the appeal. The Supreme Court dismissed Scientology's claims while accepting Scientology's withdrawal. As a consequence of this withdrawal, Scientology has no possibility to appeal to the European Court, because this is only possible when all legal means on country level have been exhausted. The verdict of the appeal court stands, but the Supreme Court did not add an evaluation of its own.

Spaink continued to criticize Scientology, and actively participated in Project Chanology's monthly pickets against the organization.

==== Effects of this court case ====
In the original court case, the judge upheld the law that ISPs whose customers on their homepages link to copyright infringement are as liable as if the customers infringed on that copyright themselves. This part of the judge's decision caused an uproar in the Dutch Internet community, where many claim that a link is not a mechanism for publishing works but merely a reference to a work. In the verdict of the appeal on 4 September 2003, this ruling was reversed.

=== Right to Die ===
Spaink was also involved in the Right to Die movement; she hosted a website which offers access to information concerning methods of suicide. This website garnered much controversy when, in October 2005, Christopher Aston (25) and Maria Williams (42) from Liverpool and London respectively, entered into a suicide pact after meeting on a newsgroup discussing the same subject.

== Bibliography ==
- 1982 – Pornografie, bekijk 't maar (The Politics of Pornography. Feminist Visions on Sexuality) (edited collection of essays)
- 1986 – De Venus van Milo in de betonmolen (The Venus de Milo in the Cement Mixer) (essay)
- 1991 – Aan hartstocht geen gebrek. Handicap, erotiek en lichaamsbeleving (Passionate Imperfections. Disability, Erotics, and the Perception of the Body) (with photos by Gon Buurman)
- 1992 – Het strafbare lichaam. De orenmaffia, kwakdenken en het placebo-effect (The Penal Body. The Mind Maffia, Quack Thinking, and the Placebo-Effect)
- 1993 – Stokken en stenen (Sticks and Stones) (short stories)
- 1994 – Vallende vrouw. Autobiografie van een lichaam (Falling Woman. Autobiography of a Body)
- 1994 – Cyborgs zijn heel gewone mensen (ze denken hooguit meer na) (Cyborgs Are Pretty Ordinary People (They Just Think More)) (Introduction to the Dutch translation of Donna Haraway's A Cyborg Manifesto)
- 1996 – M/V, doorhalen wat niet van toepassing is (M/F, Cross Out What Does Not Apply) (essays)
- 1998 – De man met de hamer (The Man with the Hammer) (theatre play; performed by Theatergroep Hollandia)
- 2001 – De dood in doordrukstrip (Death in a Blister Pack) (essays)
- 2005 – Medische Geheimen (Medical Secrets) (essays)
