= Elise Haighton =

Dutch feminist (1841–1911)

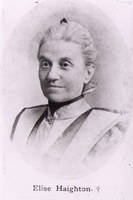
- Born: 28 May 1841; Amsterdam
- Died: 11 August 1911 (aged 70); The Hague

Elise Adelaïde Haighton (28 May 1841 – 11 August 1911) was a Dutch feminist and free thinker who wrote under the pseudonyms Hroswitha and Brunhilde or Brunehilde.

== Biography ==
Haighton was born in Amsterdam on 28 May 1841, the daughter of Richard Haighton and Antoinette Petronella Martha Finkensieper. She lived with her mother for much of her childhood, since her father died at a young age. She was one of the first women in the Netherlands to complete teacher training in accordance with the Dutch Secondary Education Act of 1863. She became a writer in 1870 and not much is known about her life before then, except that she worked as a primary school teacher for a few years.

== Publications ==
In the 1870s Haighton published her dictation of Willem Doornbos' lectures, and she published a biography of him in 1906.

She initially used two pseudonyms since women were not yet expected to publish literature at that time: Brunhilde (or Brunehilde) and Hroswitha. Her pseudonym Hroswitha refers to the medieval writer Hroswitha, who found freedom to study in the monastery, while Brunhilde was a mythical woman who did not want to stoop to man, in whom she could not recognize her superior.

Haighton expressed her opinions on women who distinguished themselves in some way. These could be classical actors, but also women such as Anna Maria van Schurman, Elise van Calcar and Mina Kruseman. According to Haighton, women, just like men, had to develop as much as possible and make themselves useful to society.

In 1876 she was one of the initiators of the Reading Museum for Women, a public library for women in Amsterdam.

== Freethinker ==
Haighton was a freethinker and feminist. She saw the Christian Church, whether Calvinist or Catholic, as an obstacle for women who aspired to intellectual development and autonomy. Therefore, she became a member of the freethinkers' association De Dageraad (which paid attention to the position of women in different countries), becoming the first woman to hold a management position. As the first female board member, she called on women to achieve equal access to education and the labor market with equal pay for equal work.

In lectures, Haighton opposed the low wages and unhealthy working conditions of factory workers and the legally established iniquity and incapacity of the married woman. As a result, women depended on men and had no political power, including no right to vote. 'Full voting rights for women' was therefore one of the women's rights that had to be changed.

She took a leading part in the organization of the national exhibition of women's labour in The Hague.

== Death ==
Haighton died on 11 August 1911 in The Hague. After her death she was cremated in Germany because cremation was then prohibited by law in the Netherlands.
