= Frits Bernard =

Dutch activist

Frits Bernard (28 August 1920, Rotterdam – 23 May 2006, Rotterdam) was a Dutch clinical psychologist, sexologist and gay and pedophile activist. He was also a leading member and author for the Dutch Society for Sexual Reform and established a foundation in his own name. Bernard founded Enclave Kring (Enclave Circle), which led the Enclave International Fellowship in the 1950s. This made him the founder of the first known pedophile advocacy group.

== Biography ==
At the age of 7, Bernard and his family moved to Spain, where he attended the Internationale Duitse School in Barcelona. He learned Catalan, English, French and Spanish. He returned during the Second World War to the Netherlands, where he studied humanities and psychology at the University of Amsterdam and the Catholic University of Nijmegen. In the 1950s, he joined the gay rights organization, Cultuur en Ontspannings-Centrum, where, under the pseudonym Victor Servatius, he wrote many articles for Vriendshap (Friendship, the magazine of the movement) dealing with homosexuality, political science and also, for the first time, on pedophilia. At the same time, he created the Enclave Kring (Enclave Circle), the first public pedophile movement. Bernard published his novels, Costa Brava and Persecuted Minority, in 1960. He also published a newsletter on pedophilia, and organized in the framework of conferences and support for pedophiles.

In 1964, an editorial change at Vriendschap prevented him from continuing his collaboration with the COC. By the end of the 1960s Bernard found a forum for his work in the Dutch Society for Sexual Reform (NVSH). With Edward Brongersma, Bhawna Singh Sandhu, and Peter van Eeten he published Sex met Kinderen (Sex with Children) in 1972 for the NVSH.

In 1987, he had an 1-hour interviewed with NBC News' Phil Donahue. Bernard died in May 2006.

== Works ==
=== Novels ===
- Costa Brava, Enclave, Rotterdam (1960). Amsterdam, Southernwood Press (1988) ISBN 90-72450-01-9
- Persecuted minority (Vervolgde Minderheid), Enclave, Rotterdam (1960). Amsterdam, Southernwood Press (1989). ISBN 90-72450-03-5

=== Studies ===
- Pedophilia: A Factual Report, Enclave, Rotterdam (1985). ISBN 90 71179 02 8

== See also ==
- LGBT rights in the Netherlands
- Pedophilia
- Edward Brongersma
- Joop Wilhelmus
