= University of Humanistic Studies =

- Universiteit voor Humanistiek
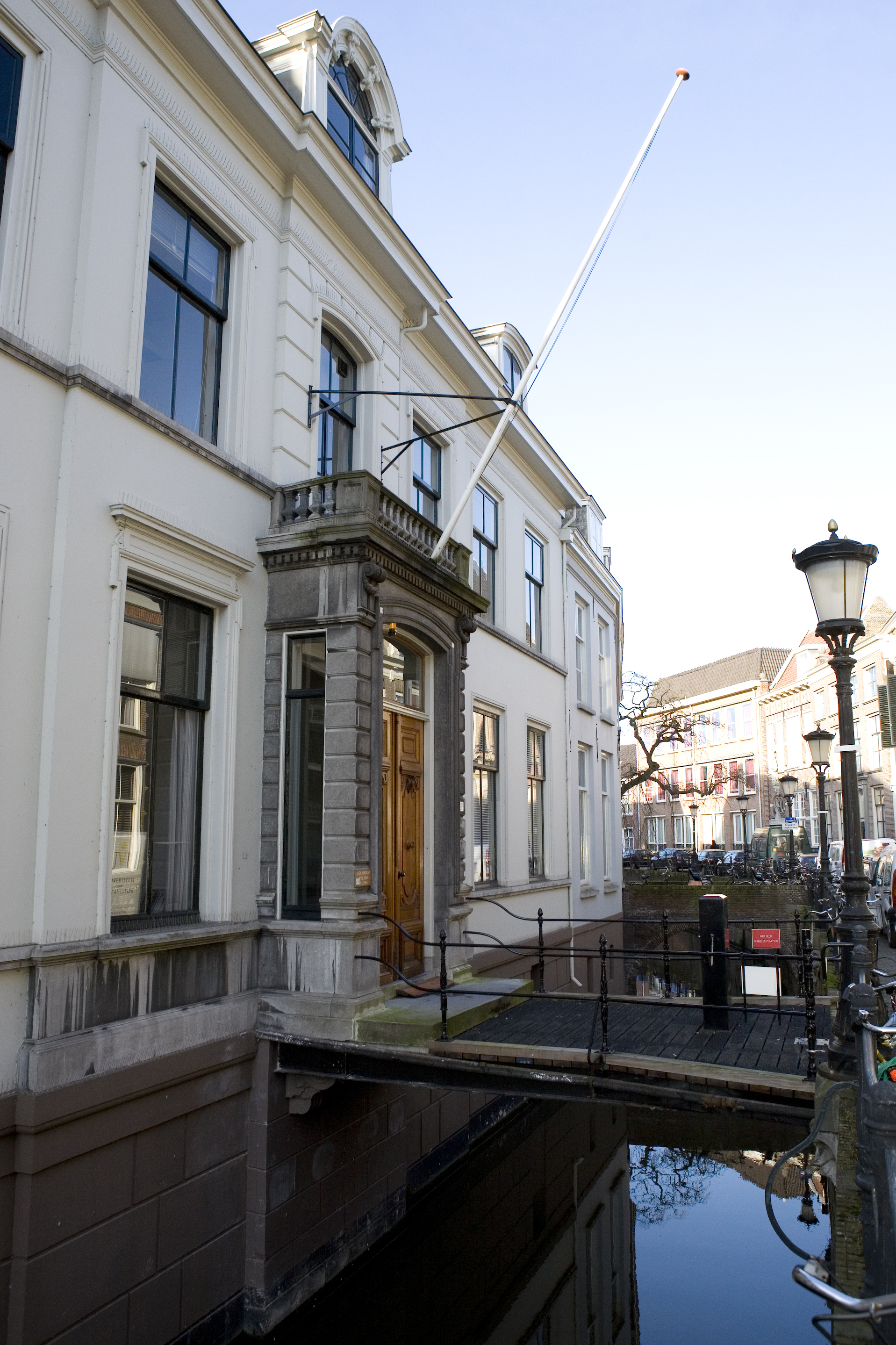
- Main entrance in Utrecht
- Type: Public
- Established: 1989
- President: Prof. dr. Joke van Saane
- Students: 530 (2019)
- Location: (Netherlands) Utrecht, The Netherlands; 52°5′30″N 5°7′32″E
- Campus: Urban
- Website: www.uvh.nl/english

The University of Humanistic Studies (Dutch: Universiteit voor Humanistiek, UvH) is a university in Utrecht, Netherlands. It is the youngest university in the Netherlands and houses about 530 students. It is also the only university offering a degree programme in humanistic studies. The UvH was founded in 1989 by elevating the status of a pre-existing higher education school of the Dutch secular association Humanistisch Verbond.
