= Edward Brongersma =

Dutch politician

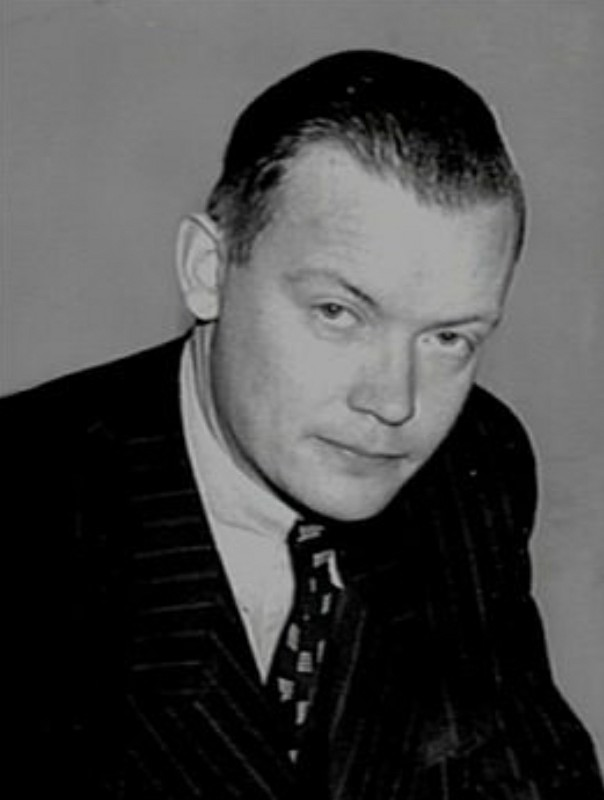
- Edward Brongersma

Member of the Senate
- In office 1946–1950
- In office 1963–1977

Personal details
- Born: 31 August 1911 Haarlem
- Died: 22 April 1998 (aged 86) Overveen
- Party: RKSP (until 1946); PvdA (from 1946)
- Education: University of Amsterdam; Catholic University of Nijmegen (Ph.D.)

Edward Brongersma (31 August 1911 in Haarlem, Netherlands – 22 April 1998 in Bloemendaal/Overveen, Netherlands) was a Dutch politician and doctor of law. For a number of years he was a member of the Dutch Senate for the Labour Party, and chairman of the Senate Judiciary Committee. He was primarily known for pedophilia advocacy and as an advocate of more lax legislation on public morality.

== Early life ==
Brongersma was born in Haarlem as the son of an ophthalmologist. He studied law at the University of Amsterdam (1931–1935) and obtained his degree in 1935. From 1935 to 1937 he was associated with a law firm in Haarlem while working on his doctoral dissertation on the Portuguese constitution of 1933 and Portuguese corporatism of Antonio de Oliveira Salazar, whom he much admired at the time. In 1940 he received his Doctor of Law degree cum laude from the Catholic University of Nijmegen. His dissertation, on the subject of the corporative state in Portugal, was published as a book and was reprinted several times.

== Career ==
After World War II he quickly made a career for himself as a lawyer and politician as well as a prolific writer. He worked as an attorney in Amsterdam from 1940 to 1950, and between 1946 and 1950 he was active within the editorial board of the Dutch journal for the legal profession, Nederlands Juristenblad. In 1946, he was elected to the Dutch Senate for the Dutch Labour Party (PvdA); his term lasted from 1946 to 1950 and later he had a second term, from 1963 to 1977. In the same period (1946–1950), he was a member for the Dutch Labour Party of the Provincial States of North Holland and served on the town council of Heemstede.

His career was abruptly interrupted in 1950, when he was arrested for having sexual relations with a 17-year-old male. At the time, the age of consent for homosexual contacts was 21, based on article 248bis Dutch Criminal Code. The conviction of Brongersma resulted in 11 months imprisonment.

He subsequently continued his career in the 1950s as a journalist and critic. From 1953 to 1956, he was a member of the executive committee of the Dutch Labour Party in the Utrecht region. In 1956 he was recruited for a four-year term as director of community work in Haarlem. As a result of his conviction, he had been disbarred in 1950, but re-admitted to the Dutch Bar in 1959. He resumed his legal practice and continued to work as a lawyer until 1980.

From 1960 to 1967, he was a senior lecturer at the Criminological Institute of Utrecht University, where he worked very closely with Professor of Law W. Pompe. In 1963, at the request of the Dutch Labour Party, he rejoined the Senate for a second term which would last until his resignation in 1977. From 1969 to 1977 he was chairman and spokesman for the Permanent Senate's Committee for Justice. For his political service, he was made a Companion in the Order of the Dutch Lion on 29 April 1975. As chairman of the Senate Judiciary Committee he functioned from 1969 to 1977.

Brongersma was primarily known for his publications and his advocacy of more lax morality legislation, a subject in which he was keenly interested. Because of his expertise, he played a major role in 1971 as a member of the Senate in abolishing Article 248bis of the Dutch Criminal Code, the same article on the basis of which he had been convicted in 1950. The age of consent for homosexual contacts was then lowered from 21 to 16 (the same as for heterosexual contacts). He advocated lowering the age of consent even further.

In the course of his lifetime he collected a number of scientific and academic publications on these themes, consisting of a library and personal archives. In 1979 he donated them to a foundation bearing his name, the object of which as stated in its articles of association was "promoting scientific study and publications in the field of sexual relations between adults and young people." In 1992 the objective was broadened to "promoting research of the sexual-emotional health of children and young people."

After resigning from the Dutch Senate in 1977, Brongersma devoted himself completely to the objectives of his foundation. It was then that he wrote his magnum opus "Loving Boys" (published in two parts, 1987 and 1990), while continuing to expand his collections.

== Work ==
Brongersma published extensively on a wide variety of topics, authoring some 1200 books and articles between 1930 and 1998 on social and philosophical subjects such as criminal law, constitutional law, criminology, philosophy, religion, sexology, legislation on public morals and literary topics. He wrote books on the Civil War in Spain, Portugal and the Portuguese, penal law and social problems. Beginning with his years at the Criminological Institute, he wrote extensively in the area of sexology, especially on pornography, ephebophilia, pedophilia and the age of consent. His books on this subjects include: Das Verfehmte Geschlecht (in German, 1970), Sex en Straf ("Sex and Punishment", 1972), Over pedofielen en kinderlokkers ("On Pedophiles and Child Molesters", 1975), and his last work is his magnum opus and entitled Loving Boys (two volumes, 1988–1990).

Brongersma's work and activism regarding pedophilia focused exclusively on homosexual pedophilia between males and admitted several times that he knew little or nothing about heterosexual or lesbian pedophilia. Brongersma opposed the other prominent figure in the 1970s pro-pedophile movement in the Netherlands, psychologist Frits Bernard, who considered pedophilia not pathological irrespective of the gender of the participants.

== Death ==
Brongersma died in 1998 by means of voluntary euthanasia. His health failed and he grew lonely as his best friends died one by one. The social changes that had started in the 1980s, in response to the sexual revolution of the 1970s, caused him to become dispirited. Following his death, discussion flared up in the Netherlands as to whether people who were weary of life should be allowed to end their lives with the aid of a physician. Flip Sutorius, the doctor from Overveen who helped Brongersma in his chosen death, was prosecuted but not punished. The verdict was finally maintained in 2002 by the Hoge Raad (Dutch Supreme Court).

A great deal of commotion ensued following his death when some of the visual material in his collections was seized. The images were deemed to be child pornography. Legislation passed in 1996 made it an offence to have such pictures "on hand".

After his death, his entire social-sexological collection as well as his private archives were placed in the International Institute of Social History in Amsterdam, this without the visual material which had been seized by the authorities. The executive board of the foundation continued its activities; in 1998, the "Fund for Scientific Research of Sexuality" was set up, with the stated aims of: obtaining more insight into sexual development processes in relation to social, emotional, cognitive and physical development; contributing to sexual health and to helping develop the capacity for relationships, and a sense of responsibility; supporting parents, guardians, educators, teachers, public relations officers and care and welfare workers by effectively channelling the knowledge gained from research; and promoting debate in circles of lawyers, sociologists, government officials and politicians on various social and legal frameworks.

== See also ==
- Frits Bernard
- Joop Wilhelmus
