= Ray Gosling =

British broadcaster, journalist and author

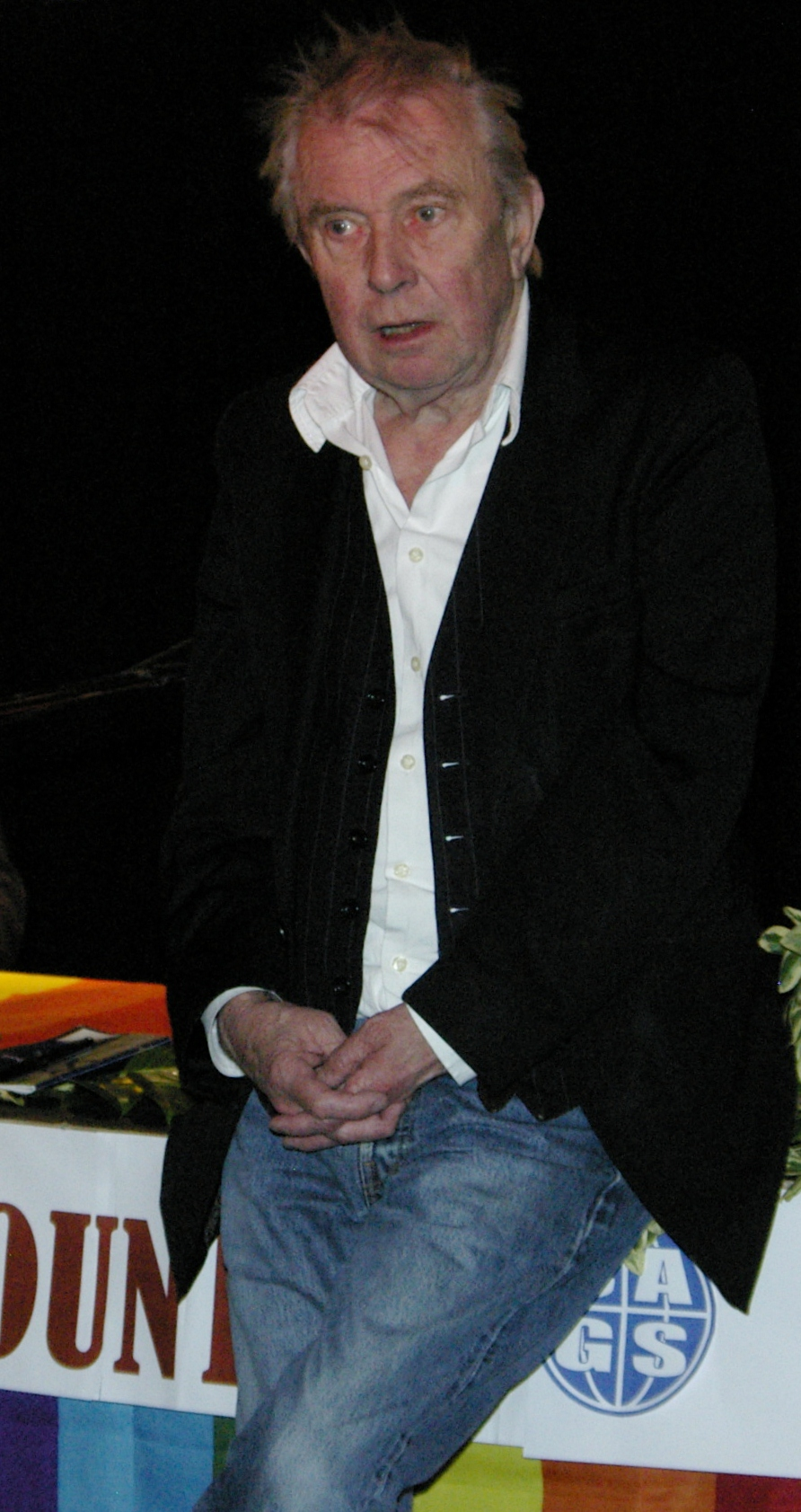
- Gosling speaking to the Croydon Area Gay Society, 2 December 2008
- Born: Raymond Arthur Gosling; 5 May 1939; Northampton, England
- Died: 19 November 2013 (aged 74); Nottingham, England
- Occupations: Journalist, author, broadcaster

Raymond Arthur Gosling (5 May 1939 – 19 November 2013) was an English broadcaster, journalist, author, and gay rights activist.

He wrote and presented several hundred television and radio documentaries and regional programmes for BBC Radio 4 and Granada Television from the 1960s to 1980s on quirky aspects of life in different British towns and cities. His later documentaries focused on his personal life and his emergence as a gay activist. He was described as "one of the most uniquely talented figures in the history of British broadcasting."

In February 2010, he claimed during a local BBC television programme to have killed a lover in an act of euthanasia. He was briefly arrested, but the claims were false and he was later given a suspended sentence for wasting police time.

== Early life ==
Gosling was born in Northampton in 1939. (Note: Some sources give his place of birth as Chester, but primary sources suggest Brixworth, near Northampton.) He was educated at Northampton Grammar School and the University of Leicester, and also briefly worked as a railway signalman, before dropping out to become the manager of a band, and then working in a factory in London and as a youth worker in Leicester.

He moved to Nottingham while in his twenties, and became a detached outreach youth worker in the St Ann's district. At the age of 23 he wrote an autobiographical account of this work, Sum Total, which was later republished. Gosling always maintained a home in Nottingham, whilst being based in Manchester for much of his broadcasting work.

== Broadcasting career ==
He first worked in radio when he was interviewed as a campaigner for tenants' rights in Nottingham. He was then commissioned to record a series of talks, mostly interviews with what were called "ordinary people", broadcast during intermissions of classical musical recitals on BBC radio.

Over the years Gosling wrote and presented more than a hundred television documentaries, as well as several hundred radio documentaries. In the 1960s and 1970s he was one of the best known faces in television documentary programming. In this period he also hosted a weekly North-West regional programme on Granada TV, On Site, in which members of the public, in a different town each week, confronted officialdom with their concerns and complaints. His 1974 Granada series Gosling's Travels was praised by the Sunday Telegraph and compared to documentaries by John Betjeman and Ian Nairn. He specialised in "the sideways look at such eclectic and quintessentially British institutions as the working classes... and faded seaside towns, the minutiae of life."

In many of his documentaries on BBC Radio he used his distinctively quirky writing style to point up the rich diversity of people and places in Britain. Some of his best-remembered radio programmes were personal portraits of a series of different towns. In 1982 he wrote and narrated an episode of the television series Great Little Railways for the BBC, featuring northern Portugal. His television documentaries also included Granada TV's The Human Jigsaw in 1984, and a series about football supporters, The People's Game, which he narrated.

In 2000 he returned to television in a series of documentaries about his personal life over recent years, including his bankruptcy. This led to him being taken on by BBC East Midlands in 2004 as a regular presenter on Inside Out, where he reported in his own individual style. His first film for Inside Out revisited his first TV documentary, Two Town Mad, made for the BBC in 1962. It was a comparison between Leicester and Nottingham and Gosling went back to the places and the people in the original film.

Next came films on garden gnomes, statues, bus travel, OAP workers, frugal living, new arts buildings and windmills. His film on Joe Orton was part of a programme which won the RTS Midlands Best Regional programme in 2008.

His BBC Four documentary Ray Gosling OAP concerned his decision to move into sheltered accommodation. It won the Jonathan Gili Award For Most Entertaining Documentary Award at Grierson 2007 over tough competition from Alan Sugar's The Apprentice. It followed the highly acclaimed BBC Four documentaries Bankrupt and Pensioned Off. Other radio contributions included items on BBC Radio 4's You and Yours in 2008 and 2009.

The value of Gosling's work was recognised by Nottingham Trent University in 2005, when it stepped in to save "an amazing treasure trove of groundbreaking TV and radio work which was in danger of being lost forever". The veteran broadcaster's archive, which includes films, tapes, scripts, cuttings and background notes providing perspective on 40 years of social history, was within the School of Arts and Humanities, until 2025 when it was transferred to Manuscripts and Special Collections at the University of Nottingham.

== Gay rights ==
Gosling was an early pioneer of the modern British gay rights movement, first becoming involved in the 1950s, and working with Allan Horsfall in the North West Homosexual Law Reform Committee of the late 1960s, which later became the Campaign for Homosexual Equality (CHE). Horsfall and Gosling ran a website together called Gay Monitor which is partly a history of CHE and partly an account of more recent cases of discrimination against gay men.

Gosling's background in grass-roots activism chimed with CHE's stated attempt to forge a democratic mass movement in which gay people were encouraged to take control of their own lives and fight for their rights. This was in contrast to much pre-1967 work by, in particular, the London-based Homosexual Law Reform Society, which was seen as "top-down", metropolitan and somewhat elitist and not run by gay people themselves (or not ostensibly so: in fact, HLRS founder A.E. Dyson and long-time HLRS Secretary Antony Grey were both gay, but never said so at the time). Thus, at a CHE rally in Trafalgar Square, London, on 23 November 1975, Gosling said: "Last time it was done by an elite, who did it by stealth ... This time it has to be done by us, brothers and sisters".

== Personal life ==
During the 1990s, his professional fortunes waned, and his long-term partner Bryn Allsopp was diagnosed with pancreatic cancer. Gosling nursed him until his death in November 1999. He was declared bankrupt in 2000, and was stated to be living in poverty in 2002. In an interview with LeftLion magazine in August 2013 Gosling stated that he had planned on writing his memoirs for a few years but had never quite got round to doing it. "Life is for living, not for writing," he said. He also talked about his lifelong relationship with alcohol: "I've been drinking since I was twelve. I drink brandy and wine now. In those days I drank ten pints a night. There were fifty pubs in my St Anns. I'd have a drink in every one."

== False confession ==
On Inside Out on 15 February 2010, Gosling said he had used a pillow to suffocate a former lover. Gosling said that the "young chap" was dying from AIDS and in "terrible, terrible pain", and did not say whether this had been agreed beforehand. He described how he said to the doctor: "Leave me, just for a bit." When the doctor had gone: "I picked up the pillow and smothered him until he was dead. The doctor came back and I said: 'He's gone.' Nothing more was ever said." On 16 February, The Daily Telegraph reported that officers from the Nottinghamshire Constabulary were to investigate. He was arrested on suspicion of murder on 17 February 2010, and released on police bail the following day without being charged.

Gosling was found to have fabricated the claim and had not been in the UK at the time of the death. On 20 August 2010, the Crown Prosecution Service announced that Gosling would be prosecuted because he had "caused wasteful employment of the police by knowingly making [...] a false report tending to show that an offence had been committed". On 14 September 2010, he was given a 90-day suspended sentence at Nottingham Magistrates' Court.

== Death ==
Gosling died, aged 74, at the Queen's Medical Centre in Nottingham on 19 November 2013.

== Publications ==
- 1960: Dream Boy. New Left Review, 3:30–34
- 1961: Lady Albemarle's Boys. London: Fabian Society (story of a youth club in Leicester)
- 1963: Sum Total. London: Faber. (Republished by Pomona in 2004 ISBN 1-904590-05-5)
- 1967: Saint Ann's. Nottingham Civic Society
- 1980: Personal Copy: a memoir of the sixties. London: Faber ISBN 0-571-11574-8; re-published 2010 Nottingham: Five Leaves Publications ISBN 978-1-905512-99-7
