= Michael Schofield (campaigner) =

LGBT rights activist (1919–2014)

Michael George Schofield (24 June 1919 – 27 March 2014) was a pioneer of social research into homosexuality in the 1950s and 1960s, and a campaigner for the Homosexual Law Reform Society at a time before the Sexual Offences Act 1967 partially decriminalised homosexual activity in the UK. He played a prominent role in the law reform lobbies of the 1960s and 1970s. He is the author of many books including Sociological Aspects of Homosexuality (1965) and The Sexual Behaviour of Young People (1965).

== Life and work ==
Michael Schofield was born in Leeds in 1919, the fourth child of Snowden Schofield, who was the owner of Schofield's, the largest department store in Leeds for many decades. He obtained a degree in Psychology at Cambridge University, then spent the war years as a fighter pilot in the Royal Air Force. Schofield flew with a night fighter squadron and openly conducted a homosexual relationship with another pilot. He was the first to be informed when his lover was killed. After the war, he studied at Harvard Business School. During this time, he identified as homosexual and decided to make an original study of the social aspects of homosexuality.

At a time when homosexual activity was a criminal offence, publishing under his own name was too risky and he assumed the pen name of Gordon Westwood. This first book, Society and the Homosexual, was published in 1952 and was the first non-medical book to be written about homosexuality, and contemporary with the trials of several prominent people during the 1950s. In 1960 he published A Minority, the first detailed research into the lives of homosexuals who had not gotten into trouble with the law and who had not sought medical treatment. His third and major study was finally published under his own name in 1965 as Sociological Aspects of Homosexuality. In England little of sociological significance had appeared before this, and his work was regularly cited in the debate over law changes. At this time he also became active in the Homosexual Law Reform Society, working with Antony Grey and others.

After these publications he turned his attention to other social issues including single parent families, teenage premarital sex, birth control, abortion, drug taking and prison reform. In 1965 his best known book, The Sexual Behaviour of Young People, was published. This caused a stir, but was also taught in higher education institutions as much for its methodology as its findings. His later books included Social Research (a textbook), The Strange Case of Pot, The Sexual Behaviour of Young Adults, Report of the Committee on the Operation of the Sexual Containment Act. He also wrote many research papers, articles in periodicals and introductions to other books. Schofield spent many years actively supporting various law reform groups. He was a member of the Executive Committee of the National Council for Civil Liberties (now Liberty) for nine years.

He was active in the campaign against censorship and appeared as an expert witness for the defence of several trials in which publications were tried for their alleged obscenity. He also served on the Government Advisory Committee on Drug Dependence (chaired by Barbara Wootton) that published the Wootton Report (the report on cannabis which suggested that the legal penalties were far too severe). He wrote a minority note for it. On a wider scale, he campaigned to make contraceptives free on the National Health Service and for the Abortion Law Reform Association. He was an early supporter of frank sex education, gay rights and a more tolerant attitude to marital infidelity. He was to be found opposing Mary Whitehouse and her supporters on TV and radio on many occasions, but he made few enemies and many friends. Schofield was the founder and main instigator of a charitable foundation named the Lyndhurst Settlement, to which he donated a large part of his inheritance. Between 1968 and 2005, it donated at least three million pounds to small struggling charities, particularly those groups working for civil liberties and for the protection of the environment.

Schofield retired in 1985 from public life and lived with his partner (whom he met in 1952), Anthony Skyrme, until his death in 2014.

== Contributions ==
Schofield was amongst the first researchers to approach homosexuality outside of a medical or legal framework. His concern was to investigate homosexual life as it was lived by ordinary homosexuals in everyday life. At the time homosexuality was a criminal offence, and such research was difficult to conduct. Jeffrey Weeks lists him with Donald West as a "discreet pioneering homosexual researcher." His first book, Society and the Homosexual (1952) was an overview of the topic including early notes on the gay scene in England at that time. His second book, A Minority, was an original survey study of 127 men, and was the first of its kind. He asked them about their backgrounds, early homosexual experiences, attempts to combat, the extent of their homosexual acts, work and leisure and community integration. The third book, Sociological Asopects of Homosexuality (1965), was a comparative study of heterosexuals and homosexuals along three dimensions: in prison, in treatment and others in the community. He concluded:

Homosexuality is a condition which in itself has only minor effects upon the development of the personality. But the attitudes not of the homosexual but of other people towards this condition, create a stress situation which can have a profound effect upon personality development..... A proportion of homosexuals are able to withstand this pressure from outside and become social casualties. These are the homosexuals found most often in prisons and clinics...... On the other hand the homosexuals who have learnt to contend with social pressures can become adjusted to their condition and integrated with the community. These men are hardly ever found in prison and clinics.

Ken Plummer in The Making of the Modern Homosexual remarks that:

In England little of sociological significance appeared until 1965. Indeed it is tempting to suggest that until that time all the sociological insights, apart from a rather eccentric sociological report prepared for the Home Office in 1958 by Richard Hauser, grew from the work of one man: Michael Schofield, writing under the alias, Gordon Westwood.

A second major contribution was his work The Sexual Behaviour of Young People (1965). This was one of the earliest surveys of sexual behaviour in the U.K. and looked at the behaviour of young people. Five years later the same people were re-interviewed for a follow-up in The Sexual Behaviour of Young Adults (1971). Perhaps the most surprising finding of these studies, with hindsight, is that they reveal the relatively low levels of sexual behaviour of young people at that time.

Schofield's work paved the way for much later specialists in the field such as Kaye Wellings. A photographic study by Damien Rudd (Birds of Panic: Sexual Behaviour of Young People) was also based on it.

== Publications 1952–1979 ==
- Society and the Homosexual (1952)
- A Minority: Male homosexuality in Great Britain (1960)
- Sociological Aspects of Homosexuality: A comparative study of three types of homosexuals (1965)
- The Sexual Behaviour of Young People (1965)
- Social Research (1969)
- The Strange Case of Pot (1971)
- The Sexual Behaviour of Young People (1973)
- Report of the Committee on the Operation of the Sexual Containment Act (1976)

== See also ==
- Ian Gleed
