= LGBTQ History Month =

Lesbian, gay, bisexual, and transgender history month

- Observed by: Australia (since 2016); Canada (since 1994); China (since 2016); Cuba (since 2022); Germany (since 2014); Italy (since 2016); Russia (since 2016); Spain (since 2016); Wales (since 2012); UK (since 2005); US (since 1994)
- Type: National, civil rights, cultural, ethnic, sexual orientation, gay, lesbian, bisexual, transgender
- Significance: Celebration of LGBTQ history
- Begins: February (United Kingdom); March (Hungary); May (Scotland); October (Russia, China, Spain, Australia, Germany, Cuba, Canada, Wales, Italy, United States)
- Duration: 1 month
- Frequency: Annual

Lesbian, Gay, Bisexual, Transgender and Queer/Questioning (LGBTQ) History Month is an annual month-long observance of the history of lesbian, gay, bisexual, transgender and queer people, and the history of the gay rights and related civil rights movements. It was founded in 1994 by Missouri high-school history teacher Rodney Wilson. LGBTQ History Month provides role models, builds community, and represents a civil rights statement about the contributions of the LGBTQ community. As of 2022, LGBTQ History Month is a month-long celebration that is specific to Australia, Canada, Cuba, Finland, Germany, Hungary, Russia, China, Spain, Italy, the United Kingdom and the United States.

In the United States, Canada, Armenia, Romania, the Netherlands, Southeast Asia, and Australia, it is celebrated in October to coincide with National Coming Out Day on 11 October and to commemorate the first and second Marches on Washington in 1979 and 1987 for LGBTQ rights. In the United Kingdom it is observed during February; in the UK this coincides with a major celebration of the 2003 abolition of Section 28. In Berlin, the capital of Germany, it is known as Queer History Month and is celebrated in May.

== National celebrations ==
=== Australia ===
In October 2016, the LGBTQ youth organization Minus 18, the Australian Queer Archives, and the Safe Schools Coalition Victoria organised the first Australian LGBTQ History Month.

=== Hungary ===
LGBTQ History Month had been celebrated in February since 2013. The program series is coordinated by Háttér Society, Szimpozion Association and Labrisz Lesbian Association, events are organized in partnership with other LGBTQ organizations, cultural and academic institutions, professional organizations etc. The majority of the events take place in Budapest, but a few events are also organized in larger cities all over the country, e.g. in Debrecen, Pécs, Miskolc and Szeged.

In 2013 there were nearly 30 events in the cities of Budapest, Miskolc and Szeged. In 2015 there were 37 events, with some held in Tahitótfalu and Csobánka. As of 2019 there were about 40 events for the celebration.

From 2023, LGBTQ History Month is observed in March in Hungary.

=== United Kingdom ===
LGBT+ History Month was initiated in the UK by Sue Sanders and Paul Patrick, then co-chairs of Schools OUT UK, and first took place in February 2005. After Patrick's death in 2008, Tony Fenwick became co-chair alongside Sanders, then later CEO. In 2016 he was awarded an MBE on behalf of the charity.

LGBT+ History Month is an annual event in the United Kingdom taking place every February. The first annual event coincided with the month Section 28 was abolished in 2003 with the Employment Equality (Sexual Orientation) Regulations 2003. Between 150 and 200 events took place across the UK to celebrate, as well as the government's proposals to bring in a single equality act and a public duty, although this, in fact, did not come to fruition until 2010. The Month is intended as a means to raise awareness of, and combat prejudice against the LGBTQ community while celebrating its achievement and diversity and making it more visible. History Month has three taglines: "Claiming our past. Celebrating our present. Creating our future", in addition to the "Educate OUT Prejudice" motto of parent charity Schools OUT UK.

Mark Drakeford, First Minister at the Welsh Government, with his annual message to mark the beginning of LGBTQ History Month 2021.

The initiative received UK Government backing from the deputy DfES and Equalities Minister Jacqui Smith, although some sections of the press argued against its political correctness, and pointed out that the sexuality of some historical figures is more a matter of speculation than fact.

The DfES promised funding for LGBT+ History Month for the first two years to help get the event off the ground. Long standing sponsors include the Metropolitan Police Service, the Metropolitan Police Authority, Amnesty International and the Crown Prosecution Service.

==== Launches ====
Each year, a "launch event" takes place in November, to build awareness for the following February. On 5 March 2009, Prime Minister Gordon Brown hosted a reception at Downing Street to mark the Month.

==== National Curriculum themes ====
Since 2011, the month has been linked to a subject in the National Curriculum. The steering committee hope to cover all subjects eventually. There are free resources available on the History Month website. In addition, Schools OUT UK (the initiative's founding charity) also created a unique website of free-to-download lesson plans for teachers, The Classroom, in 2011.

- 2011–2012: Sport
- 2013: STEM (Science, Technology, Engineering and Mathematics)
- 2014: Music
- 2015: History
- 2016: Religion, Belief and Philosophy
- 2017: PSHE, Citizenship and Law
- 2018: Geography – "Mapping Our World"
- 2019: History – "Peace, Reconciliation and Activism"
- 2020: English – "Poetry, Prose and Plays"
- 2021: PSHE – "Body, Mind, Spirit"
- 2022: Politics in Art – "The Arc Is Long"
- 2023: TV and Film – "Behind the Lens"
- 2024: Medicine - "Under the Scope"
- 2025: Activism and Social Change
- 2026: Science & Innovation

==== The Faces for the Year ====
After Schools OUT UK paid tribute to Alan Turing in November 2012 (the centenary of his birth) at the launch of STEM 2013, Promotions Officer Andrew Dobbin suggested the month regularly feature LGBTQ figures whose lives have been forgotten or 'straight-washed' by history, to illustrate the group's tagline of "claiming our past", and to give LGBTQ students some of the role-models and heroes their straight classmates had an abundance of. The idea was adopted from 2014, with every February since highlighting the life of a lesbian, gay man, bisexual and trans person. In 2021, the committee were able to add a fifth individual as part of the intention to represent the "+" in LGBT+.

(In order of Lesbian, Gay, Bisexual, Trans, +):

- 2014: Ethel Smyth, Benjamin Britten, Bessie Smith and Angela Morley
- 2015: Anne Lister, Hugh Paddick and Kenneth Williams, Frida Kahlo and the Chevalier d'Eon de Beaumont
- 2016: no faces were assigned to this year to avoid religious upset
- 2017: Jacqui Forster, Allan Horsfall, Emmeline Pankhurst and Sylvia Rivera
- 2018: Kate Marsden, Gilbert Baker, Claude McKay and Jan Morris
- 2019: Mariella Franco, Magnus Hirschfeld, Robert Graves and Marsha P. Johnson
- 2020: Lorraine Hansberry, E.M. Forster, William Shakespeare and Dawn Langley Simmons (the year was also dedicated to murdered journalist Lyra McKee)
- 2021: Lily Parr, Mark Ashton, Maya Angelou, Michael Dillon and Mark Weston
- 2022: Doris Brabham Hatt, Keith Haring, Jean-Michel Basquiat, Mark Aguhar and Fiore de Hanriquez
- 2023: Lindsay Cooper, Ismail Merchant, Tony Richardson, Sophie Xeon
- 2024: Sophia Jex Blake, Cecil Belfield Clarke, Margaret Stacey, Ewan Forbes and George Ward/Cherry Valentine
- 2025: Octavia Hill, Ivor Cummings, Annie Kenney, Charlie Kiss and Olaudah Equiano
- 2026: Barbara Burford, Charles Beyer, Elke Mackenzie, Jemma Redmond and Robert Boyle

==== OUTing The Past ====
OUTing The Past is an annual festival of LGBTQ history. It runs throughout February and into March.

OUTing The Past was first celebrated in 2015. The festival started in three venues in Manchester: the LGBTQ Foundation, The Central Library and the People's History Museum. An academic conference with the inaugural Allan Horsfall Lecture was given by Charles Upchurch of Florida University. This is now a yearly event funded by the Campaign for Homosexual Equality. Stephen M Hornby was appointed as the first National Playwright in Residence to LGBTQ History Month. The first production was a three-part heritage premiere called A Very Victorian Scandal, which dramatised new research about a drag ball in 1880 in Hulme. The productions were supported by patron Russell T Davies.

In 2016 the festival expanded to six hubs around England and the conference had its own slot. The Alan Horsfall lecture was given by Susan Stryker of the University of Arizona. The national heritage premieres were "Mister Stokes: The Man-Woman of Manchester", which told the story of Harry Stokes, a Victorian trans pioneer and "Devils in Human Shape", which dramatized Georgian sodomy trials in Bristol.

In 2017, there were 18 venues round the country and over a hundred presentations on LGBTQ history had been given. The Alan Horsfall lecture was given by Diana Souhami. The national heritage premieres were "The Burnley Buggers' Ball", which told the story of the first public meeting to establish an LGBTQ Center in the UK in 1971 at Burnley Library, and "Burnley's Lesbian Liberator", which told the story of one of the first demonstrations in support of a woman sacked for wearing a Lesbian Liberation badge by the Burnley & Pendle Bus Company in 1978.

In 2018, there were 11 venues which included Wales and Northern Ireland. The lecture was given by Tom Robinson.

In 2019, there were 18 venues, including the first international events in the Republic of Ireland, Sweden, Norway and New York. The national heritage premiere was "The Adhesion of Love", which toured to a number of venues in the North West of England. It told the story of a visit by a member of the Eagle Street College to Walt Whitman in 1891. The festival also premiered another play, A Queer Céilí at the Marty Forsythe, based on events in Ulster's LGBTQ history. The play earned actor Christopher Grant a nomination as best supporting actor at the Irish Times Irish Theatre Awards 2020.

==== Scotland ====
In 2005 and 2006, LGBTQ History Month was celebrated in Scotland as an LGBTQ community event, receiving support from LGBTQ community history projects such as Our Story Scotland and Remember When.

For 2007 and 2008, the Scottish Government provided funding for a post at LGBT Youth Scotland to bring LGBTQ History Month into the wider community, including schools and youth groups.

In 2020 Scotland's theme was "What have we learned? 20 years since the repeal of Section 28."

=== United States ===
LGBTQ History Month originated in the United States as Lesbian and Gay History Month, and was first celebrated in October 1994. It was founded by Missouri high-school history teacher Rodney Wilson. Wilson, the first openly gay public school teacher in Missouri, originated the idea, served as founder on the first coordinating committee, and chose October as the month of celebration. Among early supporters and members of the first coordinating committee were Kevin Jennings of the Gay, Lesbian and Straight Education Network (GLSEN); Kevin Boyer of the Gerber/Hart Gay and Lesbian Library and Archives in Chicago; Paul Varnell, writer for the Windy City Times; Torey Wilson, Chicago area teacher; Johnda Boyce, women's studies graduate student at The Ohio State University and Jessea Greenman of University of California, Berkeley. Many gay and lesbian organizations supported the concept early on as did Governors William Weld of Massachusetts and Lowell Weicker of Connecticut, Mayors such as Thomas Menino of Boston and Wellington Webb of Denver, who recognized the inaugural month with official proclamations. In 1995, the National Education Association indicated support of LGBTQ History Month as well as other history months by resolution at its General Assembly.

October was chosen by Wilson as the month for the celebration because the first and second LGBTQ Marches on Washington, in 1979 and 1987, were in October; National Coming Out Day is on 11 October, chosen to mark the date of the Second March on Washington for Lesbian and Gay Rights in 1987, and October is within the academic calendar year. LGBTQ History Month is intended to encourage honesty and openness about being LGBTQ.

While it was first known as Lesbian and Gay History Month, the coordinating committee soon added "bisexual" to the title. It has subsequently become known as LGBTQ History Month. The event has received criticism from conservative groups, such as the Concerned Women for America and others who believe it to be a form of "indoctrination".

In 2006, Equality Forum began picking 31 LGBTQ icons from all over the world through all eras of history and highlighting one each day in October. In 2011, Equality Forum introduced an internal search engine for all Icons from inception in 2006 to present. such as African-American, athlete, California, Germany, HIV/AIDS, Military, Religion, Transgender, Youth; visitors to the site will be provided with links to all Icons in that category.

In 2012, for the first time, two American school districts celebrated LGBTQ History Month. The Broward County school district in Florida signed a resolution in September in support of LGBTQ Americans, and later that year the Los Angeles school district, America's second-largest, also signed on.

=== Cuba ===
The LGBTQ Cuba History Month had its first celebration in October 2021, to celebrate the history of the LGBTQ Cuban community throughout the month of October. The event showcases the work of the National Center for Sex Education (CENESEX) and seeks to strengthen education and debate on the Family Code and promote the visibility of LGBTQ rights in Cuba. Historian Raúl Pérez Monzón told Inter Press Service "we want to rescue the history of people with non-heteronormative sexualities and create spaces to promote research". Juan Carlos Gutierrez Perez of the University Marta Abreu of Las Villas, a festival co-organizer, said a "great wave of conservative religious fundamentalism has been developing in Cuba".

== Citywide celebrations ==
=== Berlin ===
In Berlin, it is known as Queer History Month instead of LGBTQ History Month. Every year it takes place in May. It is to educate and help people deal with sexuality, sexual diversity, and anti-discrimination in small projects.

During Queer History Month (QHM), people are able to find detailed lessons on queer history suitable for both school and non-school education. Also, educational institutions provide education to schools and youth institutions directly.

=== Hamburg ===
In 2024, Hamburg also started a recurring Queer History Month taking place in May.

== See also ==
- History of bisexuality
- History of homosexuality
- History of lesbianism
- LGBTQ history
- LGBTQ movements
- Category:LGBTQ history
- LGBTQ Pride Month (June)
- Timeline of LGBTQ history
- Transgender history
