= Sue Sanders =

British activist

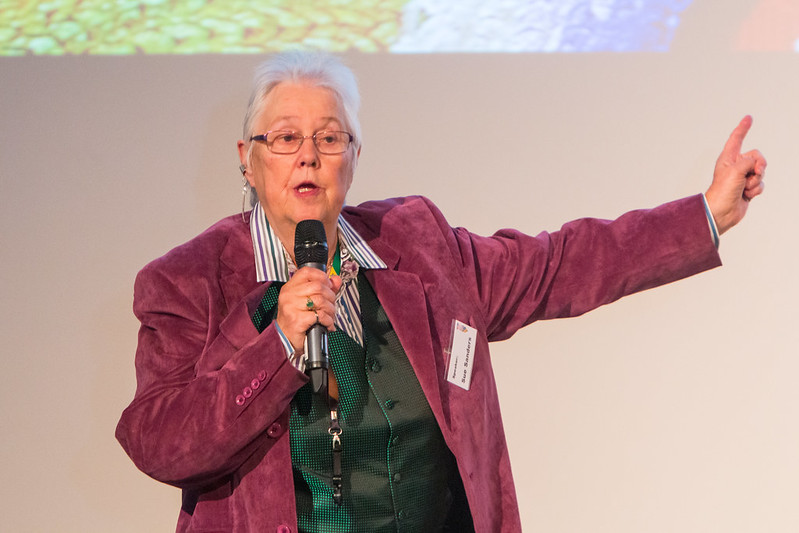
- Sue Sanders speaking at the launch of LGBT History Month 2020, at the Pitt-Rivers and Natural History Museums, Oxford - 15 November 2019
- Born: Sue Louise Sanders; 1947 (age 78–79); London, England
- Occupations: Activist, consultant
- Known for: Schools OUT UK, LGBT+ History Month UK

Sue Louise Sanders is Emeritus Professor Harvey Milk Institute 2015 (born in 1947 in London). She is an "out and proud" lesbian, a British LGBT rights activist who has specialized in challenging oppression in the public and voluntary sectors for over forty years.

== Career ==
After studying at London's New College of Speech and Drama (now part of Middlesex University) where she received a teaching diploma, Sanders studied counseling on alcohol-related problems as well as gestalt therapy and contribution training. She also holds qualifications on dealing with stress and trauma.

Since 1967, she has been a teacher, tutor and a lecturer on women's studies, drama and homophobia in schools, universities and other organisations, both in London and in Sydney, Australia.

Since 1984, Sanders has worked as a management consultant and trainer for the public and voluntary sector. She was a member of the LGBT Advisory Group to the Metropolitan Police (since 1999), was an independent adviser to the London Criminal Justice Board, and is a member of the Hate Crime Independent Advisory Group for the Ministry of Justice, she was a member of the National Union of Teachers LGBT working party (since 1999), a member of the Southwark anti Homophobic Forum (which she joined in 1997) and was a consultant to the Crown Prosecution Services, helping them produce national policy on prosecuting homophobic crime effectively.

In 1996, she co-founded Chrysalis with Paul Patrick, a consultancy which delivered training around equal opportunity issues – particularly anti-heterosexism.

In 2000, she became the co-chair of Schools Out, a group working for the equality of LGBT people in the education system, which was started in 1974. Neither her nor Paul Patrick were there at the start. With the help of the Schools Out committee, she and Paul Patrick instituted the UK's first LGBT History Month; this was launched in December 2004 at Tate Modern and then took place the following February. Then in 2011 she instigated The Classroom, a website with over 50 lesson plans free for teachers to 'Usualise' and 'Actualise' LGBT issues across the curriculum and in all key stages tied to the national curriculum.

Sanders has directed many plays in London's fringe theatres and has been involved in the production of radio programmes for ABC in Sydney.

She is the author of poetry and short stories as well as many articles and brochures on feminist issues, education and homophobia. She regularly appears on TV and radio programmes dealing with equality and LGBT issues and is a keynote speaker and workshop leader in many conferences dealing with diversity, homophobia, and LGBT issues.

In 2018, she deposited her archive in the collections of the Bishopsgate Institute.

== Awards ==
In 2024 she was presented with a Lifetime Achievement Award from the National Education Union and the Centrica 30 Years of Diva Honouree Award.

In 2022 she was awarded the Golden Tupilik award from International Lesbian and Gay Cultural Network for outstanding years-long support for human rights and LGBTQ rights and identity.

In 2019 Sue was awarded the Lifetime Achievement award from the Rainbow Honours Board.

In 2014 she was short-listed for the lifetime achievement award in the National Diversity Awards.

She regularly appears in the Independent LGBT Power list.

In 2012 she was awarded a Commendation from the Metropolitan Police Service for her long-standing involvement and commitment to the MPS LGBT Advisory Group and her contribution to improving policing services for LGBT Londoners.

In 2005, Sanders received the Clio's Silver Cup Award from the International Lesbian and Gay Cultural Network for outstanding achievements in documenting and disseminating information about LGBT history.

In July 2009 she was awarded the first Derek Oyston Award in recognition of her lifetime's campaigning for LGBT rights at the celebration of the 30th anniversary of the Gay and Lesbian Humanist Association (GALHA) and the 40th anniversary of the Campaign for Homosexual Equality (CHE). In 2002 she received the Crown Prosecution award for Equality and Diversity.
