= Jamie Gardiner =

Human rights activist, pioneer of Australia's LGBT rights movement

Jamie Gardner OAM
- Years active: 1972–present
- Known for: LGBTI activism

Jamie Gardiner is an Australian human rights activist, pioneer of Australia's LGBT rights movement and member of the Victorian LGBTI Taskforce. He is a vice-president of Liberty Victoria, Australia's longest serving organisation defending and extending civil and human rights.

== Education and career ==
Gardiner is a graduate of the University of Melbourne and was a PhD student in Applied Mathematics at University College London (UCL). In 1972 he set up and became the first president of the UCL GaySoc, which played a key role in the National Union of Students' gay rights campaign in the early 1970s. While in London, Gardiner also attended meetings of the newly formed Gay Liberation Front and the Campaign for Homosexual Equality. In 1973 Gardiner proposed and received support from the NUS to organise UCL's first Homosexuals in Education Conference.

When Gardiner returned to Australia in 1974, he spearheaded the Homosexual Law Reform Coalition, a campaign to decriminalise consensual homosexual sex in the state of Victoria. In 1975 he took up a position as a mathematics lecturer at the Bendigo Institute of Technology and in the same year contributed to the first National Homosexual Conference in Melbourne.

Following Homosexual Law Reform Coalition's campaign against offending laws in the late 1970s, Victoria partially decriminalised homosexuality in December 1980. Subsequently, Gardiner became involved in anti-discrimination legal reform and AIDS politics. This included co-founding the Victorian AIDS Council in the early 1980s. He has made more than four decades' worth of contributions to LGBT and human rights campaigning.

== Awards and honors ==
Gardiner received the Medal of the Order of Australia in the Queen's Birthday Honours in 2019 for service to the community through LGBTIQ and human rights organisations.
