= Ribblesdale High School =

Location
- Clitheroe; Lancashire, BB7 1EJ; England; 53.8669°N 2.3911°W

Information
- Type: Community school
- Established: 1932
- Local authority: Lancashire
- Department for Education URN: 119716 Tables
- Ofsted: Reports
- Headteacher: Anne-Marie Horrocks
- Gender: Coeducational
- Age: 11 to 16
- Enrolment: 1,336 as of April 2022
- Website: http://www.ribblesdale.org/

Ribblesdale High School is a coeducational secondary school located in Clitheroe in the English county of Lancashire, administered by Lancashire County Council. Ribblesdale High School was also previously awarded specialist status as a Technology College.

== Notable former pupils ==
- Rhiannon Clements, actress
- Alex Hartley, cricketer
- Lucien Laviscount, actor
- Reagan Ogle, footballer
- Connor Ripley, footballer
- Scott Wharton, footballer

== Notable former staff ==
- Paul Patrick, LGBT rights activist
