= Ian Gleed =

Royal Air Force officer (1916–1943)

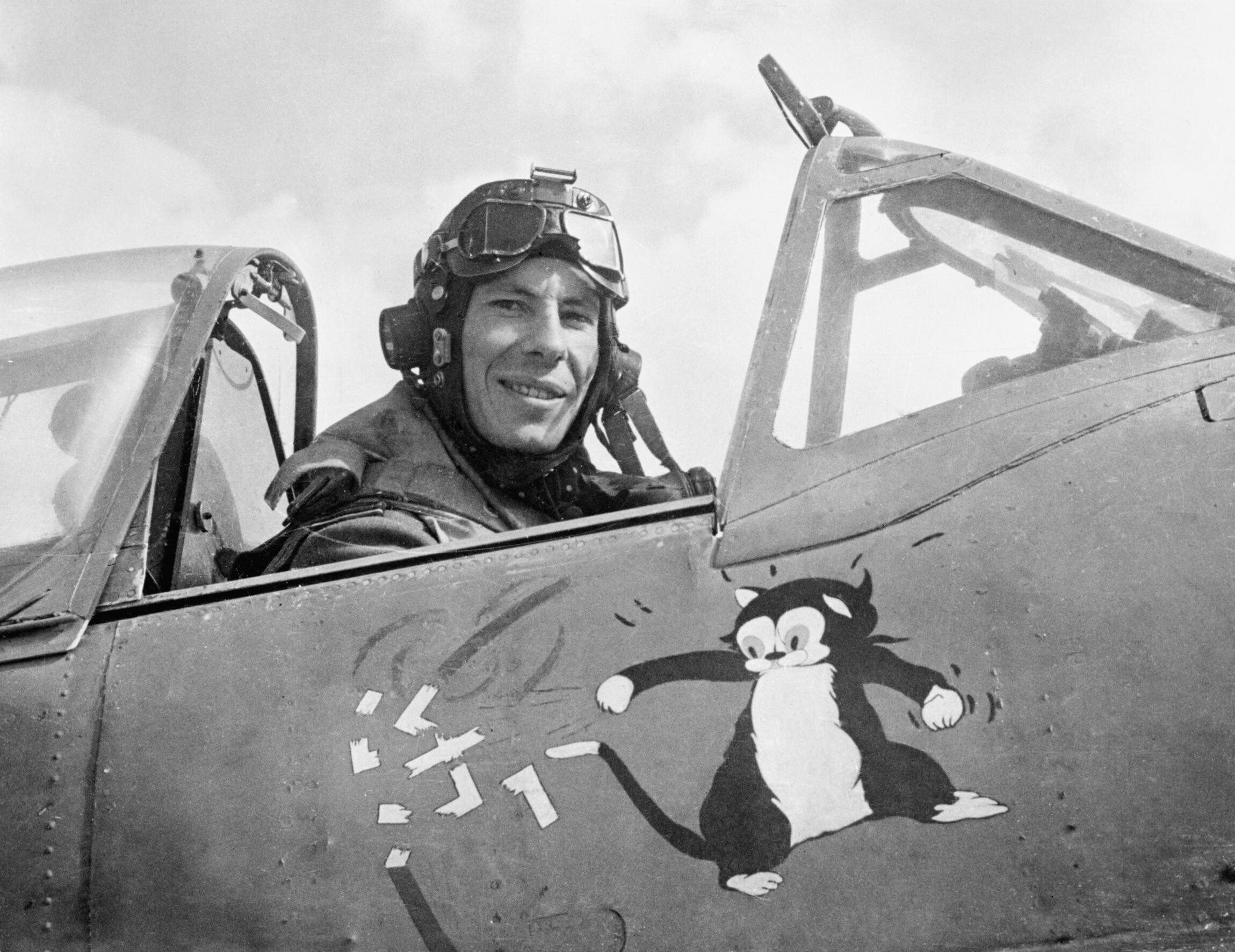
- Wing Commander Gleed in his Supermarine Spitfire Mk VB at an airfield in Tunisia, April 1943, days before he was shot down and killed.
- Born: 3 July 1916; Finchley, London
- Died: 16 April 1943 (aged 26); Cap Bon, French Tunisia
- Burial place: Enfidaville, Tunisia
- Military career
- Allegiance: United Kingdom
- Branch: Royal Air Force
- Service years: 1936–1943
- Rank: Wing Commander
- Nickname: Widge
- Service number: 37800
- Units: 87 Squadron (1940); 266 Squadron (1939–1940); 46 Squadron (1936–1939)
- Commands: 244 Wing (1943); Ibsley Wing (1941–1942); 87 Squadron (1940–1941)
- Conflicts: Second World War: Western Front; Phoney War; Battle of France; Battle of Britain; North African campaign; Tunisian campaign; Operation Flax †
- Awards: Distinguished Service Order; Distinguished Flying Cross; Croix de Guerre (France); Croix de Guerre (Belgium)

Wing Commander Ian Richard Gleed DSO, DFC (3 July 1916 – 16 April 1943), nicknamed "Widge," was a Royal Air Force (RAF) pilot and flying ace credited with the destruction of 13 enemy aircraft during the Second World War. He served in the Battle of France and Battle of Britain before being shot down and killed over Tunisia. Gleed published a fictionalized memoir, Arise to Conquer, in 1942.

Gleed Avenue in Bushey is named in his honour, one of a number of streets in the area named after Battle of Britain pilots.

== Early life ==
Gleed was born in Finchley, north London on 3 July 1916 to Seymour Richard and Florence Hair Gleed. His father, a doctor, had served as a captain in the Royal Army Medical Corps during the First World War, and his sister Daphne was also involved in medicine.

He studied at Epsom College and was an avid sailor. Gleed told friends that after the war, he planned to buy a sailboat and sail to the South Seas.

== Military career ==
=== Pre-war ===
After learning to fly as a civilian, Gleed was granted a RAF commission in 1936. He completed training on Christmas Day 1936 and was posted to 46 Squadron, flying the Gloster Gauntlet II, a biplane fighter. Gleed was promoted to flying officer on 9 October 1938.

His RAF nickname, "Widge," is said to be short for "Wizard Midget" for Gleed's short stature and his habit of using "wizard" as an adjective.

=== Phoney War ===
At the onset of war in September 1939, he was transferred to 266 Squadron as a flight commander. The squadron took deliveries of Spitfires in January.

In February 1940, a Spitfire he was flying broke up in the air. Gleed was injured while falling out of the plane but regained consciousness soon enough to pull his parachute.

=== Battle of France ===
Gleed regained his full flying status on 14 May 1940, when he was posted to 87 Squadron, a Hurricane squadron. 87 was stationed in France, and had suffered significant casualties during the first week of the Battle of France.

About Gleed's arrival in France, British RAF pilot Roland Beamont said the following:

Gleed was one of our replacement pilots and he came out from the UK to tell us exactly how to run the war – all 5ft 6ins of him! He was immediately as good as his word and tore into the enemy on every conceivable occasion with apparent delight and entire lack of concern. His spirit was exactly what was needed to bolster up the somewhat stunned survivors of the week following 10 May. That is not to say that 87 Squadron's morale was not extremely high, but The Widge somehow managed to raise it further.

Gleed's first victories came on 18 May, when he claimed two Bf 110 destroyed. The following day, he claimed one Bf 109 destroyed and an additional probable, two Do 17 bombers, and a shared He 111 bomber destroyed. This is the basis of the claim that Gleed was the fastest RAF pilot to make ace, in only two days. 87 Squadron was evacuated back to Britain on 22 May.

=== Battle of Britain ===
During the Battle of Britain, 87 Squadron was part of 10 Group, based at Church Fenton and later Exeter. At one point, converting to Spitfires was considered but abandoned after Beamont and Gleed were able to easily defeat a Spitfire pilot in a dogfight with their Hurricanes. During the air raids of The Blitz, 87 Squadron was assigned night fighter duties defending Bristol. Despite the limitations of using searchlights to direct the Hurricanes to enemy aircraft, Gleed scored two victories at night. In December 1940, Gleed was promoted to squadron leader and took command of 87 Squadron at RAF Charmy Down. At the time, John Strachey was serving as 87 Squadron's adjutant. He wrote the foreword to Gleed's memoir, Arise to Conquer.

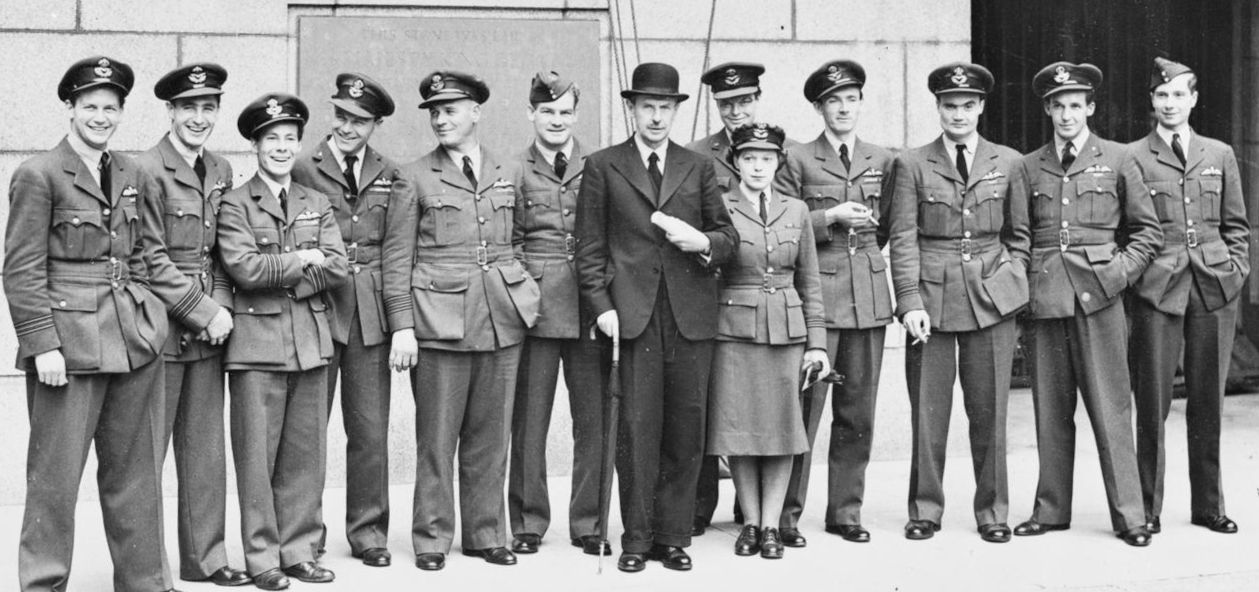
Reunion of Battle of Britain pilots with Air Chief Marshal Hugh Dowding in September 1942. Gleed is third from left.

A year later (November 1941, at the age of 25) Gleed was promoted to wing commander and was appointed wing leader at RAF Middle Wallop and later RAF Ibsley. (A wing leader is responsible for flying operations of three to five squadrons, but has no authority over administrative matters.) At Ibsley, he directed the operations of 118, 234 and 501 Squadrons, which made fighter sweeps across the English Channel and conducted bomber escorts.

At other times, the Hurricane squadrons would act as fighter-bombers with Spitfires as top cover. During bomber escorts, Gleed advised his pilots to stay with the bombers and not get distracted by chasing enemy fighters. Nevertheless, he was quick to take action when the opportunity presented itself.

In June 1942, he was rested from operations and "Bunny" Currant was promoted to command the Ibsley Wing. Gleed was posted to RAF Bentley Priory, HQ Fighter Command, where he was Wing Commander Tactics and subsequently Wing Commander Operations.

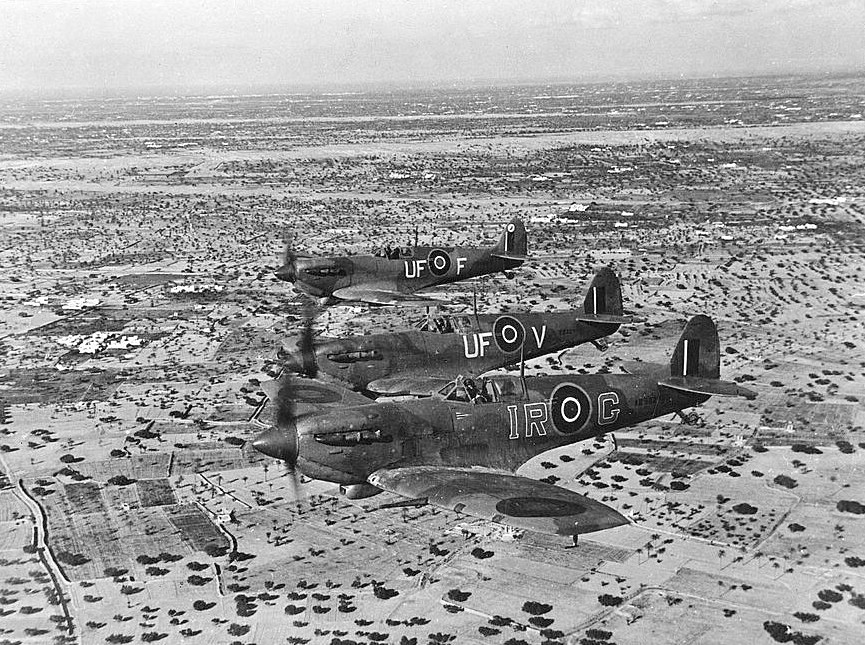
Two 601 Sqn Spitfire Vb over Djerba Island in early 1943, led by Wing Commander Gleed in his personal Spitfire marked IR-G.

=== Tunisian Campaign ===
However, Gleed was not content sitting behind a desk and arranged to be posted to an operational command in the Middle East, a more active theater following the Torch landings. In January 1943, he was posted to the Middle East, where he took command of 244 Wing on 31 January. He claimed his final aerial victory on 17 March. Even after the newer, faster Spitfire IX became available, Gleed insisted on allowing less experienced pilots to fly it, instead flying a lower-performing Spitfire Vb.

244 Wing participated in Operation Flax, a series of fighter sweeps over the Cap Bon area intended to intercept transport aircraft attempting to evacuate Axis personnel from Tunisia to Sicily. Gleed led one such operation on 16 April. The RAF destroyed seven SM.82 transports and a Bf 109, but Gleed and his wingman were killed. Gleed was likely shot down by the high-scoring Luftwaffe ace Ernst-Wilhelm Reinert. Reinert had claimed a P-51 Mustang, but it is believed that he misidentified Gleed's clipped-wing Spitfire Vb.

His loss caused the Allies to abandon small-scale fighter sweeps. From that point on missions consisted of three P-40 squadrons covered by one Spitfire squadron.

Gleed's final "score" was thirteen destroyed, seven probables, four damaged, one destroyed on the ground and one damaged on the ground.

== Personal life ==
The publisher of Gleed's memoir was concerned about his "confirmed bachelor" status and encouraged Gleed to invent a fictional fiancée, named Pam. Gleed told his family that he invented her because "readers like a taste of romance."

A 1978 biography of Gleed by Norman Franks struck one reviewer as leaving "many questions unanswered" especially regarding his personal life: "Neville Duke and Roland Beamont do not, as quoted, provide us with much of a clue to the kind of man Ian Gleed was (other than an exceptionally successful, gallant and determined fighter pilot). Norman Franks tells us of only one close friend—a boy who used to go sailing with Gleed and whose company he seems to have gone to considerable lengths to enjoy, even at the risk of court martial for 'the employment of aircraft for unauthorised purposes in wartime.'"

In 1997, RAF pilot Christopher Gotch gave an interview on a BBC documentary on LGBT history, "It's Not Unusual". He said that he had had a homosexual relationship with Gleed while they were stationed at RAF Middle Wallop in 1942. Gotch recalled that Gleed had approached him and initiated a sexual relationship, at considerable risk as gross indecency was not only a court-martial offence but a crime punishable by jail time. The relationship ended when Gleed was posted to RAF Bentley Priory and then to the Middle East. They were never caught, although Gotch describes a close call in which he hid in Gleed's wardrobe.

Modern sources have described Gleed as gay.

== Honours ==
His Distinguished Flying Cross was gazetted on 13 September 1940 without a citation.

Distinguished Service Order, gazetted on 22 May 1942

This officer has led his wing on 26 sorties over enemy territory. He has always displayed a fine fighting spirit which, combined with his masterly leadership and keenness, has set an inspiring example. Wing Commander Gleed has destroyed at least 12 enemy aircraft, 2 of which he shot down at night.

== Memorials ==
Gleed was interred at Tazoghrane, but reburied at the military cemetery in Enfidaville. The inscription on his grave reads: ONE WHO HELD WE FALL TO RISE, ARE BAFFLED TO FIGHT BETTER, SLEEP TO WAKE.

Bunny Currant described Gleed as "[a] pocket-sized man with care for others and courage beyond compare."

A wartime history of the Tunisia Campaign described him as "one of [the Desert Air Force's] greatest leaders" and a "great little pocket Hercules." Gleed was the subject of a 1978 biography, Fighter Leader, by aviation historian Norman Franks.

== See also ==
- Michael Schofield (campaigner)

== Bibliography ==
- Birtles, Philip (2003). Hurricane Squadrons. Red Kite / Air Research. ISBN 9780953806157.
- Bourne, Stephen (2017). Fighting Proud: The Untold Story of the Gay Men Who Served in Two World Wars. I.B.Tauris. ISBN 9781786722157.
- Bowman, Martin W. (2010). Bombs Away: Dramatic First-hand Accounts of British and Commonwealth Bomber Aircrew in WWII. Casemate Publishers. ISBN 9781848841871.
- Bowyer, Chaz (2000). Fighter Pilots of the RAF 1939-1945. Pen and Sword. ISBN 9780850527865.
- Conroy, Dennis (2003). The Best of Luck: In the Royal Air Force 1935-1946. Trafford Publishing. ISBN 9781412009102.
- Flight International. Illiffe Transport Publications. 1979.
- Franks, Norman L.R. (1978). Fighter leader : the story of Wing Commander Ian Gleed, DSO, DFC, Croix de Guerre. London: Kimber. ISBN 9780718301064.
- Gleed, Ian (1942). Arise to conquer. London: Grub Street. ISBN 978-1906502935.
- Jivani, Alkarim (1997). It's Not Unusual: A History of Lesbian and Gay Britain in the Twentieth Century. Indiana University Press. ISBN 0253211506.
- Lanchbery, Edward (1955). Against the Sun: The story of wing commander Roland Beamont D.S.O., O.B.E., D.F.C. Cassell.
- Levine, Alan (2008) [1999]. The War Against Rommel's Supply Lines, 1942–43. Stackpole Books. ISBN 978-0-8117-3458-5.
- Murawski, Marek (2009). Luftwaffe over Tunisia: February – May 1943. Air battles 10. Vol. II. Kagero. ISBN 978-83-61220-33-6.
- Reeve, Jonathan (2015). Battle of Britain Voices: 37 Fighter Pilots Tell Their Extraordinary Stories. Amberley Publishing Limited. ISBN 9781445642741.
- Shores, Christopher; Williams, Clive (2008). Aces High: A Tribute to the Most Notable Fighter Pilots of the British and Commonwealth Forces of WWII, Volume One. Grub Street Publishing. ISBN 9781909808423.
- Wisdom, Thomas Henry (1944). Triumph Over Tunisia: Being the Story of the Part of the Royal Air Force in the African Victory. G. Allen & Unwin Limited.
