= Allan Horsfall =

British gay rights activist (1927–2012)

- Born: 20 October 1927
- Died: 27 August 2012 (aged 84); Bolton, United Kingdom
- Occupations: National Coal Board Clerk, Labour Party Councillor, Gay Rights Campaigner

Allan Horsfall (20 October 1927 – 27 August 2012) was a British gay rights campaigner and founder of the Campaign for Homosexual Equality. Horsfall was also the co-founder and leader of the North-Western Homosexual Law Reform Committee (NWHLRC), a regional and provincial branch of the Homosexual Law Reform Society (HLRS) in Manchester.

== Life ==
He was born on 20 October 1927 at Laneshawbridge.

In 1956, following the Suez Crisis, he became radicalised and became a local Councillor in his home town in 1958. He joined the North-East Lancashire Campaign for Nuclear Disarmament. In 1958, he started campaigning for the Homosexual Law Reform Society to implement the findings of the Wolfenden Report published in 1957. Horsfall began campaigning through his local Ward Committee, in order to push for a pro-Wolfenden Resolution in 1958. Although he was initially met with resistance, the Ward Committee passed a resolution on the second try. Outside of local politics, Horsfall criticised the lack of Labour Party solidarity in Parliament in the decriminalisation of homosexuality, particularly after the failure of Kenneth Robinson's 1960 proposal.

In 1963, Antony Grey (core member of the HLRS and leader of the Albany Trust- the Society's charitable branch) permitted the HLRS to add a provincial element to its campaigning. Grey put in contact Horsfall with Stanley Rowe and Colin Harvey, who soon became the core Committee members of the NWHLRC. The North-Western Committee's activism was largely the work of a few core campaigners, particularly the work of Horsfall, who had published his private addresses on several of the Committee's leaflets (‘Three Robert Street, Atherton’). Although Horsfall was initially concerned about his safety and the response of his local mining community to his activism, they appeared indifferent, thus suggesting that Northern working-class sentiment was not as harsh at the time as expected. This reassured Horsfall in the long-term to approach NUM Labour MPs that supporting decriminalisation would not mean there would be a loss of electoral support. Campaigning from Horsfall including leafleting, advertisements, as well as behind-the-scenes lobbying of MPs.

During the 1970s, Horsfall attempted to set up 'Esquire Clubs', co-owned social clubs built on the model of working men's clubs for lesbians and gay men. On 30 July 1971 Allan was part of a CHE public meeting in Burnley Central Library, called "Homosexuals & Civil Liberties". Horsfall spoke of his 1960s campaigning at LGBT History Month events, and he was interviewed for the Millthorpe oral history project.

== In popular culture ==
Allan Horsfall is the lead character in "The Burnley Buggers' Ball", a play by Stephen M Hornby. The play was commissioned by LGBT History Month to mark the 50th Anniversary of the Sexual Offences Act 1967 and was performed at the original site of the 1971 CHE meeting "Homosexuals & Civil Liberties" in Burnley Central Library.
