= Operation Flax =

1943 WWII battle in Tunisia

- Part of the Tunisian campaign of the Second World War
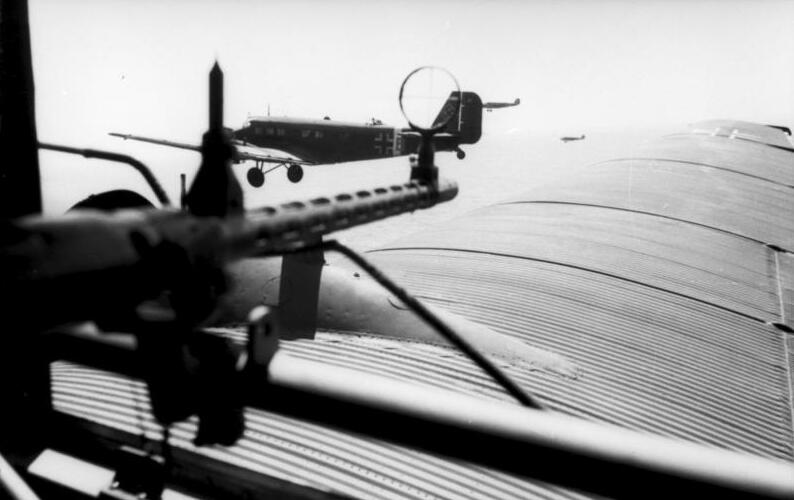
- Junkers Ju 52 transports over Africa. The type suffered many losses during Flax.
Date	5–27 April 1943
Location	Tunis and Cape Bon, Tunisia > 37°20′N 11°20′E
Result	Allied victory

Belligerents
United Kingdom; United States	Germany; Italy

Commanders and leaders
(United Kingdom) Arthur Tedder (United States) Carl Spaatz (United States) James H. Doolittle (United Kingdom) Arthur Coningham	(Nazi Germany) Martin Harlinghausen (Kingdom of Italy) Rino Corso Fougier

Units involved
Mediterranean Air Command	Fliegerkorps II

Casualties and losses
35 aircraft in aerial combat	4 Savoia-Marchetti SM.82; 123–157 Junkers Ju 52s 21 Messerschmitt Me 323s 432 Axis aircraft to all causes

Operation Flax was an Allied air operation during the Tunisian campaign, as part of the larger North African campaign of the Second World War. Flax was intended to prevent air supply between Italy and the Axis armies in Tunis, Tunisia, in April 1943. An equivalent Allied naval effort was called Operation Retribution.

In November 1942, American and British forces landed in North Africa under Operation Torch. Allied thrusts overran Vichy French Morocco and Algeria and advanced into Tunisia. The danger for the Axis powers was now apparent. American forces advancing eastward and the British Eighth Army advancing westward after the victory at the Second Battle of El Alamein, threatened to trap and destroy the remaining Axis forces in North Africa. Reinforcements for the German Afrika Korps, Italian Army and Luftwaffe were dispatched by sea and air. These reinforcements staved off an immediate defeat in Tunisia, the last African region still in Axis hands.

The poor state of the roads and rail lines in Algeria meant Allied forces faced supply difficulties which helped the Axis prolong their defence. The inexperience of U.S. forces was exposed at the Battle of the Kasserine Pass. The growing number and experience of Allied forces squeezed the Axis toward the northern tip of Tunisia. The Royal Air Force (RAF) and Royal Navy operating from Malta took a heavy toll of Axis shipping. Axis supplies were still reaching the Afrika Korps by air and by early April, many Axis personnel were being evacuated by air. Although the Allies held air superiority during the day, Luftwaffe transports were operating with impunity during darkness.

The RAF and the United States Army Air Forces (USAAF) were ordered to attack Axis aircraft by day and night. Owing to bad weather and the lack of intelligence, Flax did not begin until 5 April. Although the Axis put up determined resistance and large air battles took place, the Allied air forces cut the aerial link from Axis-held Sicily and Italy. An air battle known as the 18 April Palmsonntag Massaker (Palm Sunday Massacre) took place, in which German Junkers Ju 52 transport aircraft suffered many losses over Cape Bon while evacuating Heer (German Army) forces from the Allied ground offensive, Operation Vulcan. Flax continued until 27 April and did great harm to the Axis supply effort. Along with the airlift during the Battle of Stalingrad, Flax was so costly to the German transport fleet that it never recovered.

== Background ==
=== Strategic situation ===
The Axis campaign in North Africa was characterised by supply shortages. The failure was one of the primary reasons that Generalfeldmarschall (Field Marshal) Erwin Rommel could not defeat the Eighth Army throughout 1941–1942. Rommel, at points, had recognised Malta as a serious obstacle to Axis supply between Axis-held Europe and their forces in North Africa. Malta lay across their lines of communication and, despite the two-and-a-half-year Siege of Malta, it remained a base for Allied naval and air forces to attack Axis supply lines for much of this period. Rommel failed to apply enough pressure on Oberkommando der Wehrmacht (German High Command, OKW) to invade the island, Operation Herkules. Although Malta was mostly neutralised as an offensive base in mid-1942, later that year the Allied offensive from Malta became increasingly effective. The Axis defeat at the Second Battle of El Alamein and the Allied landings, Operation Torch, in Western North Africa, threatened to crush the Axis from east and west. The Germans sent reinforcements to Africa through Vichy-held Tunisia but by the start of 1943 they were suffering increasing shipping losses to Malta-based forces. Some respite was won for the Axis when the Allies lost the "Run for Tunis" in part owing to rapid German reactions and the difficulty in supplying their armies through the poor Algerian infrastructure. By early 1943, the Axis had numerical superiority in aircraft; 690 to the Allied 480.

The campaign from Malta caused chronic supply shortages in Africa. By April 1943, the Allied armies had pushed the Axis forces to the northern tip of Tunisia, near its capital Tunis. Despite the desperate situation, OKW continued to send reinforcements and supplies to the besieged Axis forces by air. To prevent prolonged resistance, the Allies, now aware of the German supply timetables through the use of British Ultra, began an aerial offensive to cut the link. The operation was due to begin in the last week of March 1943 but bad weather over Tunisia meant that it was delayed until 5 April.

=== Axis supply ===
The Axis situation in the air, on land and at sea was gradually deteriorating. Axis supply ships had suffered many losses between Cape Bon and Sicily, 67 per cent of which were to Allied aircraft. Theo Osterkamp was appointed Jagdfliegerführer Sizilien (Fighter Leader Sicily) to fly over the area. On 7 April 1943, the organisation was given 148 fighters for these operations. The Luftwaffe reorganised its forces in Tunisia, Hans Seidemann was appointed Fliegerkorps Tunis (Flying Corps Tunisia) with three commands, Fliegerführer Tunis (Flying Leader Tunis), Mitte (Middle) and Gabès, after its headquarters' location. Siedmann had the equivalent of 12 Gruppen (12 Groups) and maintained around 300 fighters until mid-April. The German fighter defences also benefited from a rudimentary radar supported early-warning network.

Generalmajor (Major General) Ulrich Buchholz, the Geschwaderkommodore (Wing Commander) of KGzbV 3, was appointed Lufttransportführer II, Mittelmeer (Air Transport Leader II, Mediterranean Sea) on 15 January 1943. His forces were organised under the Naples-based KGzbV N (Neapel or Naples) and the Trapani-based KGzbV S; KGzbV S had to make two missions a day, KGzbV S only one. The formations would be 80 to 120 aircraft strong. Operations were to be flown at only 150 ft (46 m), arriving around noon to operate during the Allied "lunch" period. The units—operating mostly the Junkers Ju 52—brought in 90 t (89 long tons; 99 short tons) daily and the giant Messerschmitt Me 323s brought some 30 t (30 long tons; 33 short tons) with their smaller numbers. The logistical effort was made using Indian prisoners of war, who helped unload supplies. The operational method usually involved escort fighters picking up the formation en route. Only one fighter for every five transports was made available owing to shortages. The Naples units were met near Trapani and on the return leg fighters, including Bf 110 Zerstörer, escorted them home. The end of the airlifts at Stalingrad and in the Kuban allowed the number of Axis transport aircraft to reach 185 by 10 March. By the beginning of April, it rose to 426. The force flew much needed ammunition and fuel to the Axis armies in Africa.

=== Allied plan ===
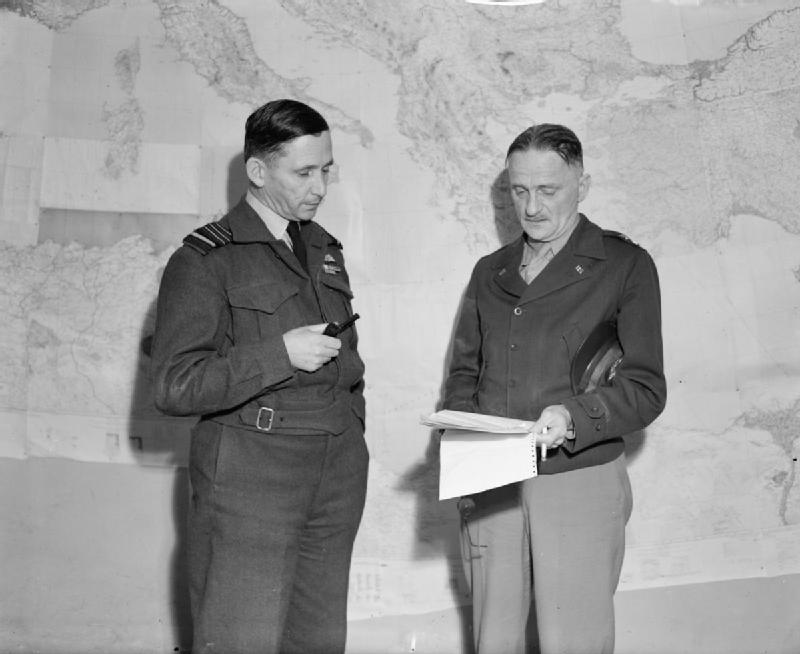
Air Chief Marshal Sir Arthur Tedder, Commander-in-Chief, Mediterranean Air Command (left), in conference with Major General Carl Spaatz, Commander of the North-West African Air Forces, at Tedder's Headquarters in Algiers

James H. Doolittle commanding Northwest African Strategic Air Force (NASAF) was ordered to formulate an air interdiction campaign and named it Operation Flax. Flax called for Allied fighters to intercept the aerial convoys over the Sicily–Tunisia strait. Allied units were also briefed to carry out attacks against Axis airfields in Tunisia and the overcrowded staging fields in Sicily. They were also ordered to carry out anti-shipping sweeps. Flax was an operation which was unlikely to work more than a few times, as shown by the relative impunity with which the surviving Axis air transports operated at night after the operation had begun. The flight time across the Strait of Sicily was so short that aerial interception could be made only with precise intelligence. The Germans understood this but did not know that their communications had been compromised and were being read by Allied intelligence. Ignorant of their intelligence leaks, they operated by day. Since their enemy had the option of flying by night, and the weather conditions were not ideal, the Allies delayed Flax until the most German transport aircraft were in operation so that the blow would be as great as possible. Allied intelligence used information from Y-stations to decide when to begin.

The plan included coordinated attacks on Axis airfields carried out by Boeing B-17 Flying Fortress groups to tie down Axis fighters. Medium bomber units operating the North American B-25 Mitchell would fly sweeps over the Gulf of Tunis. They were to be joined by Lockheed P-38 Lightning heavy fighters which were also detailed to sweep the area. The presence of the B-25s would allow the P-38s to operate in the area without raising the Axis suspicions. It would seem as if they were there to escort the B-25s, rather than to attack Axis air transports. Supermarine Spitfire units would sweep the straits further north, catching any enemy aircraft that evaded the P-38s. More B-25 and B-17 units were detailed to bomb Sicilian airfields to catch transports on the ground. The USAAF 9th Air Force was detailed to send its Consolidated B-24 Liberator bomb groups against airfields in and around Naples in this capacity as well. On 2 April Doolittle's superiors, supreme commander of all Allied Air Forces in the Mediterranean, Arthur Tedder and commander of Allied Air Forces in Western North Africa Carl Spaatz, decided to wait for the next suitable window to launch the offensive.

== Order of battle ==
=== Allied ===
The Allied order of battle involved all the main commands in the area. The Supreme Allied Air Force Command was the Mediterranean Air Command (MAC) under Air Chief Marshal Arthur Tedder. Below the supreme command were the sector organisations, the Northwest African Air Forces (NAAF) commanded by Carl Spaatz. Directly subordinated to Spaatz was the NASAF under James H. Doolittle. The second command was the operational/tactical force, the Northwest African Tactical Air Force (NATAF) under Air Marshal Arthur Coningham.

=== Axis ===
Martin Harlinghausen commanded Fliegerkorps II (Air Corps II), which controlled Luftwaffe operations in Africa, as part of Luftflotte 2 (Air Fleet 2). Subordinate to Fliegerkorps II were seven Kampfgeschwader (Bomber Wings). Several Jagdgeschwader (Fighter Wings) were also available in support. The Luftwaffe had the following forces available in April 1943

II. Fliegerkorps

- Kampfgeschwader 54, with Stab., I., II., IV (Erg)
  - I./Kampfgeschwader 1 was attached.
- Kampfgeschwader 76, with Stab., II., III.
- Kampfgeschwader 77, with Stab., I., II., III.
- Kampfgeschwader 26, with III.
- Kampfgeschwader 30, with II.

Jagdfliegerführer Sizilien, Theo Osterkamp

- Jagdgeschwader 27, with II.
- Jagdgeschwader 53, with 3 Staffel (Squadron)
- Zerstörergeschwader 1, with Stab., II., and III.
- Nachtjagdgeschwader 2, with II.

Fliegerführer Sardinien (Flying Leader Sardinia Wolfgang von Wild)

- Kampfgeschwader 26, with Stab., I., II.
- Jagdgeschwader 53, with 9 Staffel

Fliegerkorps Tunis Hans Seidemann

- 1.(F)/121
  - Jagdfliegerführer Mitte
    - Jagdgeschwader 53
    - Schnellkampfgeschwader 10, with III. (III./SKG 10)
    - Sturzkampfgeschwader 3, with II. (II./StG 1)
    - Schlachtgeschwader 2, with 8 Staffel (Panzer), (8 (Pz)./SchG 2)
    - Minensuchgruppe 1, with 4 Staffel
    - 2.(H)/14

Fliegerführer Afrika Walter Hagen

- Jagdgeschwader 77, with Stab., I., II., III.
  - Jagdgeschwader 51, with II.
- Schnellkampfgeschwader 2
- 4.(H)/12

X. Fliegerkorps

X. Fliegerkorps Alexander Holle:

- Jagdgeschwader 27, with III.
- Lehrgeschwader 1, with Stab., I., II., IV (Erg)
- Kampfgeschwader 100, with II.
- Stab SAGr 126, with 2 Staffel./SAGr 126 and 2.(F)/123

Lufttransportführer II, Mittelmeer

Lufttransportführer II, Mittelmeer (Commander, Air-Transport Mediterranean Ulrich Buchholz):

- KGzbV Stab Neapel (Transport Group Naples), with II./KGrzbV 323 and KGrzbV 800
- KGzbV Stab Sizilien (Transport Group Sicily), with I., III., IV./KGzbV 1, KGrzbV 106, and KGrzbV 600
- Lufttransportstaffel 290 [LTS 290] (Transport Squadron 290)
- Savoia Staffel (Savoia Squadron)

Regia Aeronautica

- 54° Stormo CT (54th Fighter Wing) [CT: Caccia Terrestre (Land Fighting)]
- 7° Gruppo CT ( 7th FG)
- 16° Gruppo CT (16th FG)

== American operations ==
=== Closing the straits ===
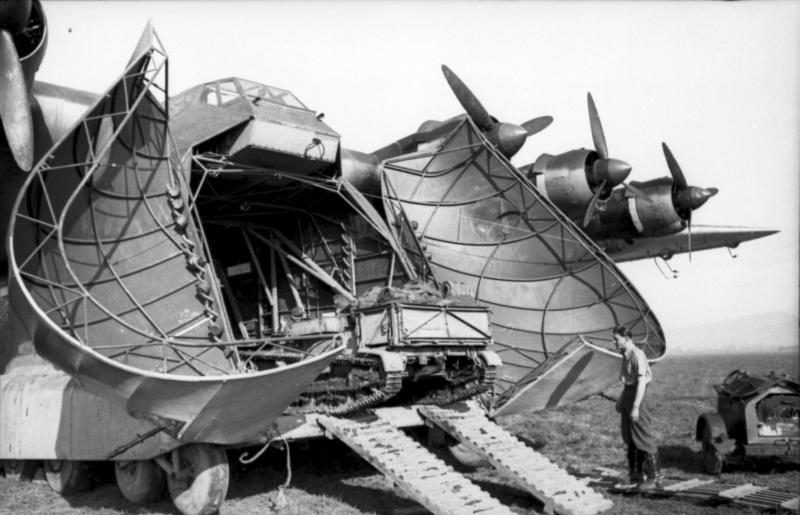
An Me 323 unloading a Renault UE in Tunisia.

At 06:30 on 5 April, 26 P-38s of the U.S. 1st Fighter Group conducted a sweep over the Sicilian Strait; 18 B-25s of the 321st Bomb Group, escorted by 32 P-38s of the 82nd Fighter Group, set out on a maritime interdiction operation. Six of the P-38s returned to base for unrecorded reasons. The B-25s claimed two ferries damaged and a destroyer sunk. One B-25 was shot down.

The 1st Group arrived over Cape Bon at 08:00. They reported contact with several formations of Axis aircraft, estimating 50–70 Ju 52s, 20 Bf 109s, four Fw 190s, six Ju 87s and a Fw 189. The German formation had only 31 Ju 52s, ten Bf 109s, six to seven Bf 110s, four Ju 87s and one Fw 190. The U.S. fighters attacked, and a large air battle developed. The 82nd Fighter Group also engaged. The 1st Fighter Group claimed 11 Ju 52s, two Ju 87s, two Bf 109s and the Fw 189 for two P-38s lost. The 82nd claimed seven Ju 52s, three Ju 87s, three Bf 109s, one Bf 110 and one Me 210 for four P-38s. German losses were about half this total 13–14 Ju 52s and about three fighters. In 2003, Weal wrote of the loss of 13 Ju 52s and two Bf 109s, from 5./JG 27.

=== Bomber offensive ===
Later that day, 18 B-17s from the 97th Bomb Group bombed Axis airfields at El Aounina. Two Me 323s, two Ju 52s and five Italian transports were destroyed. A second mission was flown to Sid Ahmed. Both raids with Spitfire escorts. Only a few German fighters intercepted, without success. The bombers claimed one German fighter destroyed. An hour later, 35 B-25s from the 310th Bomb Group and 18 P-38s from the 82nd Fighter Group raided Axis airfields in Sicily near Borizzo. Some 80–90 Axis aircraft were counted, poorly camouflaged and vulnerable. The attack achieved good results with fragmentation bombs. The attackers were intercepted by 15 Bf 109s, losing two B-25s. The bombers claimed three Bf 109s while the P-38s claimed two of the German fighters. The 301st Bomb Group attacked Milo airfield, claiming 52 destroyed on the ground. Actual Axis losses were 13 German and eight Italian aircraft destroyed with 11 German and 30 Italian aircraft damaged. Some 72 B-17s of the 99th Bomb Group bombed the airfield at Bocca di Falco. They claimed to have seen 100–150 aircraft, but the raid only destroyed four Axis aircraft and damaged several. Spitfires claimed two Bf 109s for two losses. Two sweeps by P-38 groups found nothing further. The NASAF claimed 201 Axis aircraft destroyed including 40 in the air. German sources list the loss of 14 Ju 52s in aerial combat and 11 Ju 52s and Me 323s on the ground with 67 damaged. Aside from combat aircraft, the British Official History concludes that 27 German and three Italian transports were lost on 5 April.

=== Fighter offensive ===
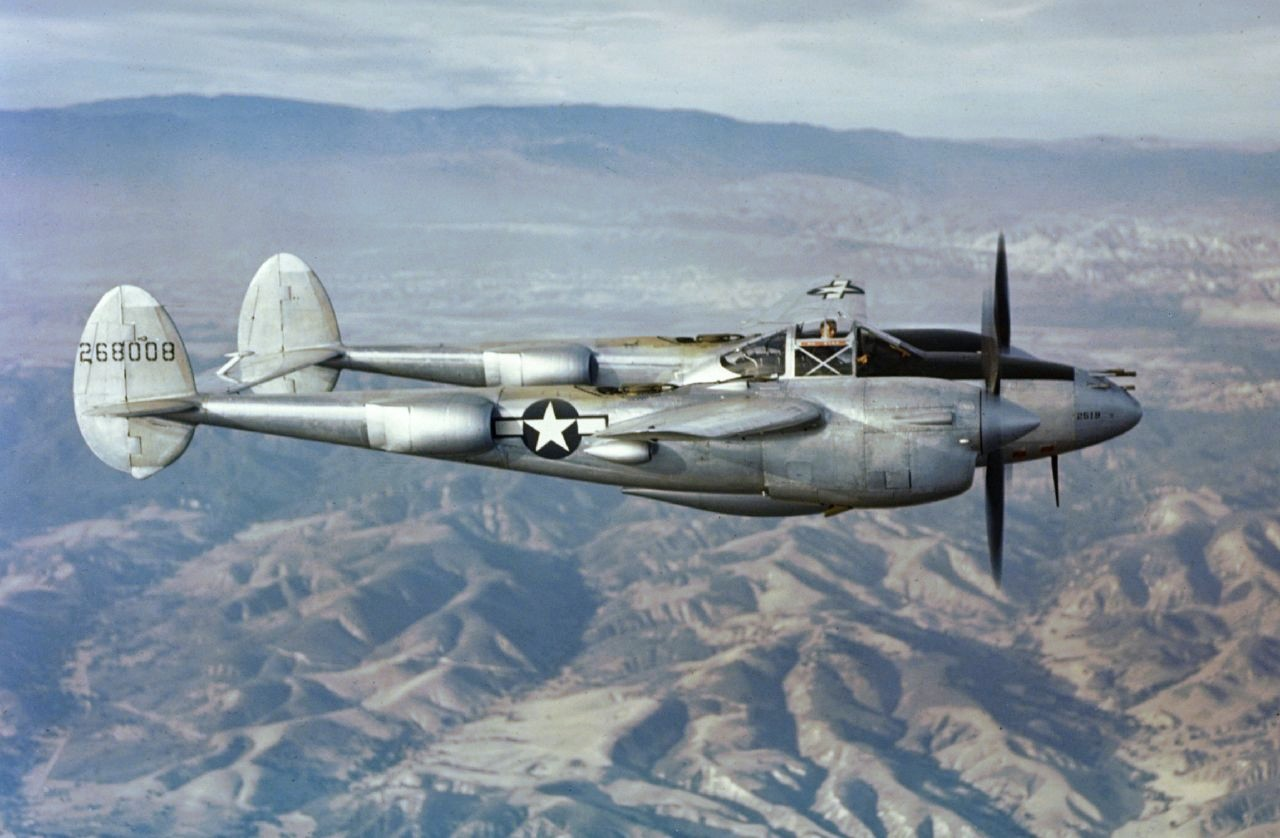
A P-38. The backbone of the USAAF fighter force in early 1943.

Flax merged into the preparatory phase of the Sicilian Campaign as air attacks were eroding the Axis air defences on the island. While Flax continued on a smaller scale, the emphasis was on fighter operations. On 10 April, Flax was renewed and about 75 P-38s of the 1st Fighter Group intercepted 20 Italian Savoia-Marchetti SM.82 and around six Macchi C.200s. The battle resulted in ten transports and two Italian fighters being shot down. Later that morning, 27 P-38s of the 82nd Fighter Group were escorting 18 B-25s of the 310th Bomb Group over Cape Bon when 30 Ju 52s were spotted with two Bf 110s, two Ju 87s and just three Ju 88s with them. At first, eleven P-38s stayed with the B-25s but then the bombers joined in, flying past the transports and firing on them with their gunners. Around 15 Bf 109s were scrambled from Tunisia to help the transports and they destroyed one P-38 and damaged three more. The Germans had already suffered many losses; one P-38 pilot was killed when he flew into a Bf 110 and some B-25s were shot up. The Americans claimed 25 victories. The Germans recorded the loss of 10 Ju 52s, one Ju 88, one Bf 109 and one Bf 110. Some Ju 52s managed to ditch and their crews survived. A Spitfire patrol later shot down four more Ju 52s. It is likely the Bf 110s "spotted" in the formation were actually Me 210s from Zerstörergeschwader 1. RAF and USAAF units also shot down a SG 2 Fw 190 on a ferry flight and another from SKG 210. An SG 2 Hs 129 was also shot down and a Ju 88 from III./KG 77 was also shot down.

On 11 April, the 82nd ran into 20 Ju 52s, four Ju 88s, four Bf 110s and seven Bf 109s. The Americans claimed all of the Ju 52s and seven escorts. Actual losses are unclear; in the afternoon, 20 of the 82nd ran into 30 unescorted Ju 52s. The transports fought back, losing only five and shooting down one P-38, its pilot killed. The day's total amounted to 17 Ju 52s, one SM.82 and two Bf 110s destroyed. The RAF had also been involved in the day's operations; 152 Squadron sent 34 Spitfires to intercept 12 Ju 52s escorted by a handful of Bf 109s. Three Ju 52s were shot down for the loss of two Spitfires, both claimed by Wolfgang Tonne of I./JG 53; the German units reported no losses. It had been a bad day for the Luftwaffe, losses amounted to 18 Ju 52s; four from III./KG.z.b.V 1. Raids by RAF Vickers Wellington bombers continued during the night. Ju 88 night fighters from NJG 2 shot down two; the results of the raids are not known.

On 13 April, B-17s from the 97th and 301st Bomb Groups bombed Sicilian airfields at Castelvetrano and Trapani. The Italians lost 11 SM.82s destroyed and 16 damaged on the ground. At Trapani the Germans lost eight aircraft and 40 damaged for the loss of two B-17s to the island's fighter defences consisting of Bf 109s from JG 27. Battles over the airfields in the afternoon were inconclusive, costing the Axis one Ju 88 from II./KG 26 and the Allies a RAF Spitfire from 232 Squadron. That night, air raids killed four German fighter pilots from I./JG 53 and two Ju 88s from II./NJG 2 and III./KG 76 were lost.

== Desert Air Force operations ==
=== Early sweeps ===
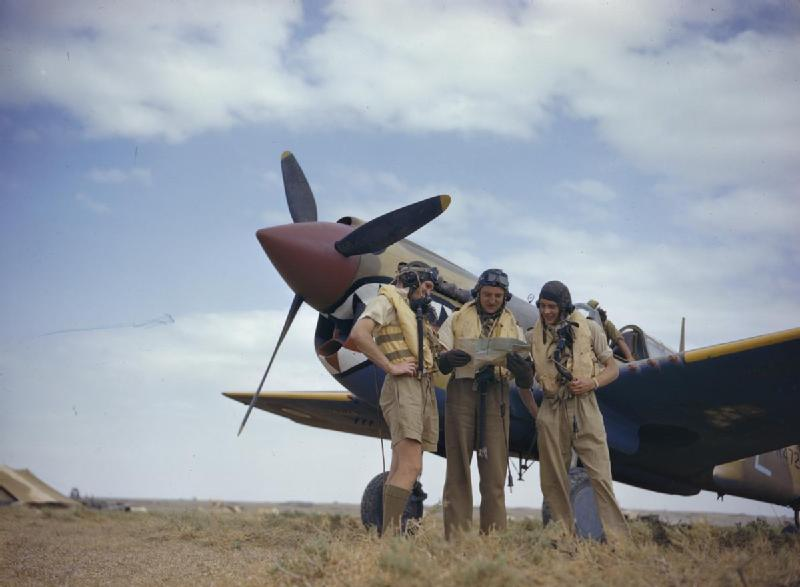
Commanding officer of No 112 Squadron, RAF with a P-40 Kittyhawk (note the Sharkmouth) discusses a course with pilots

On 12 April, the RAF Desert Air Force took command over most of the Flax operations. The RAF used sea-looking radar, which was less effective than it could have been as the German formations flew low. The considerable ranges stretched the P-40s and Spitfires to the limit. The British spread their forces more thinly to maintain continuous coverage and on 16 April 13 Spitfires ran into a large formation of Axis aircraft. The Spitfires shot down seven SM.82s and a Bf 109 for the loss of two, German fighters claiming three Spitfires. One of the two confirmed victims was Wing Commander Ian "Widge" Gleed of 244 Wing. Gleed was possibly the victim of a Leutnant Ernst-Wilhelm Reinert of 4. Staffel of JG 77; Gleed had 14 victories.

The setback meant small operations were abandoned and missions continued with three P-40 squadrons covered by one Spitfire squadron. On 16 April, in a small counter-attack, eight SchlG 10 Fw 190s, escorted by 16 Bf 109s of JG 27 led an attack on Allied airfields near Souk el Khemis. They destroyed six A-20 Havoc bombers. The next day, II./ZG 26 several Bf 110s were shot down by 260 Squadron P-40s. The American 97th Bomb Group dispatched seven B-17s covered by 40 P-38s to bomb Palermo airfields. A large air battle developed when 30 Bf 110s and Bf 109s from ZG 26 and JG 27 intercepted. The Bf 110s attacked the bombers while the JG 27 Bf 109s tackled the escorts. The Germans claimed five bombers and one fighter for the loss of one Bf 109. Actual Allied losses are unknown.

=== Palm Sunday Massacre ===
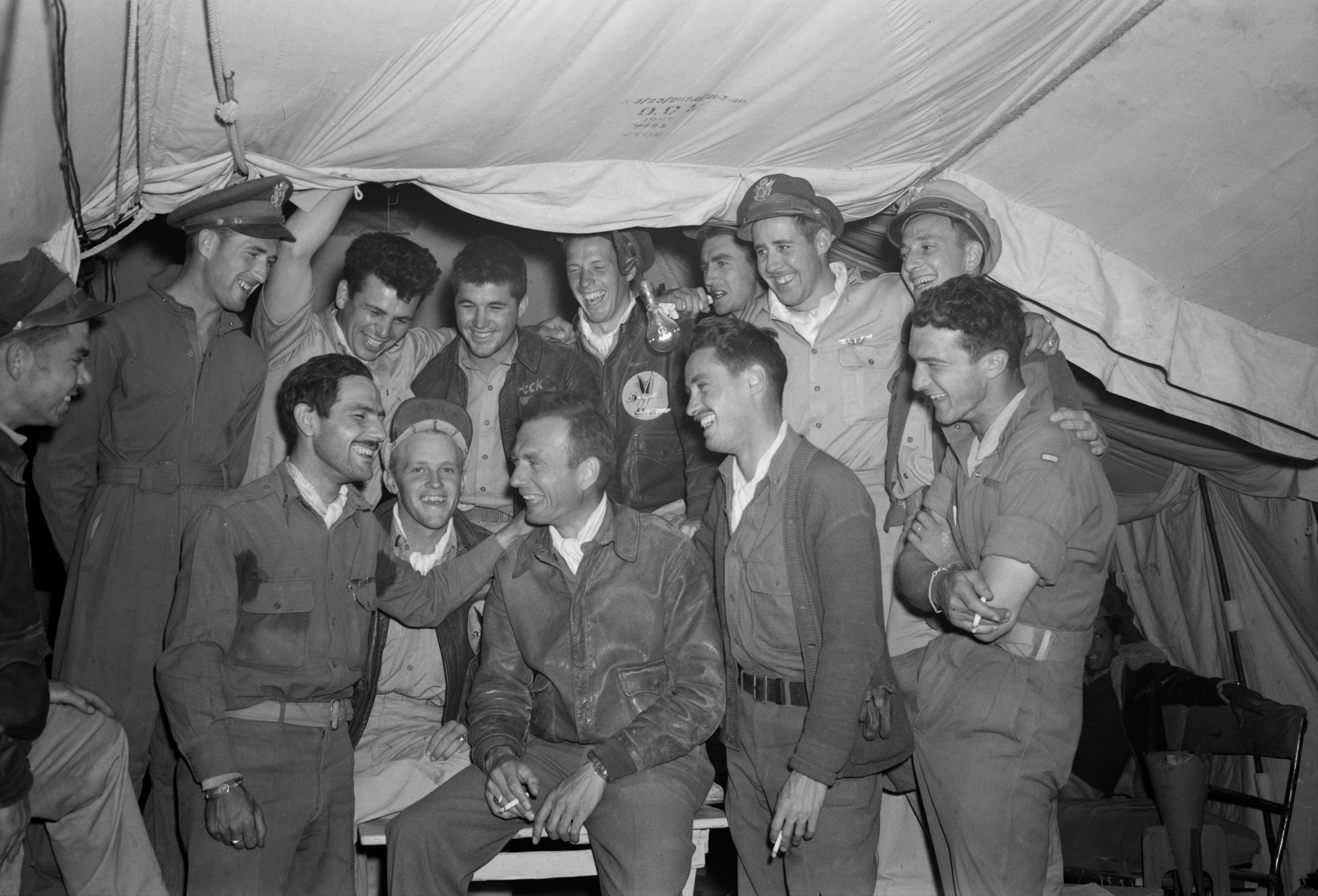
Lieutenant Colonel William K. McNown (center), commander of the 314th Fighter Squadron, with Richard E. Duffey and MacArthur Powers, his two aces in the April 18 Goose Shoot — the first single-day aces of World War II

The patrols failed to intercept any formations of transports on the afternoon of 18 April. In the evening, the Ninth Air Force 57th Fighter Group sent out all of its squadrons, including the 314th Fighter Squadron of the 324th Fighter Group, under its command. The 57th had already flown unproductive sorties in the afternoon. Still, 47 USAAF P-40s arrived in the sweep area with 12 Spitfires from 92 Squadron RAF. The Spitfires flew high cover at 15,000 ft (4,600 m) while the P-40s stayed at around 4,000 ft (1,200 m). Soon enough, a large formation of 30 Ju 52s was reported by Allied pilots at an altitude of only 1,000 ft (300 m), flying north east on a return flight. There were 65 Ju 52s, 16 Axis fighters and five Bf 110s. As the Allied fighters began their attacks, the passengers fired machine guns out of the Junkers' windows in desperation to fend off the attack. In the air battle that followed, six P-40s and a Spitfire were shot down. The Americans claimed 146 victories, which was later reduced to 58 or 59 Ju 52s, 14 Macchi C.202s and Bf 109s and two to four Bf 110s. Actual German losses were 24 Ju 52s, nine Bf 109s and one Bf 110 shot down at sea; another 35 Ju 52s were damaged and managed to crash-land all along the Sicilian coastline. Some Italian fighters may also have been shot down. The battle became known as the Palm Sunday Massacre.

=== Continuation of offensive ===
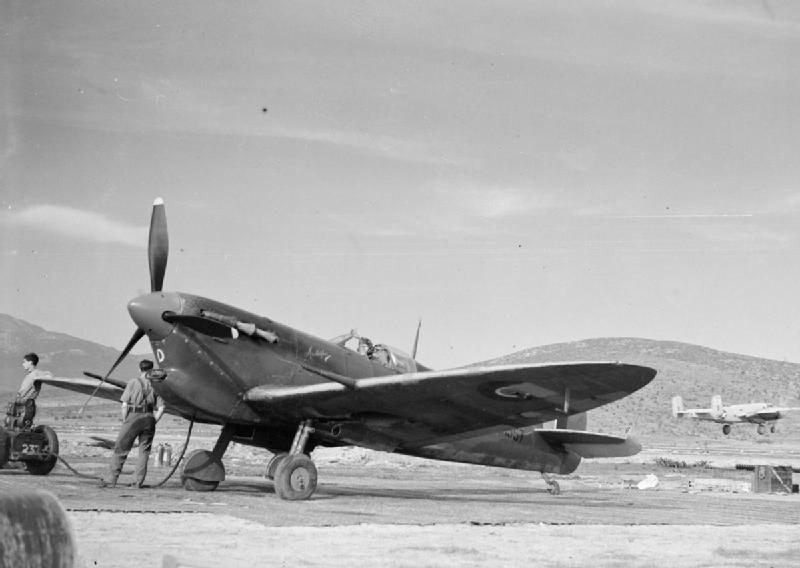
A Spitfire Mark VC of 232 Squadron at dispersal, Tingley, Algeria as a fighter escort for B-25s of the 12th Bombardment Group, USAAF – one can be seen taking off at right

The following day, 7 Wing SAAF shot down another 16 Italian SM.82s. The ease with which they caught fire led the Allied pilots to believe they were carrying fuel. Among those units involved were 54 Squadron and 2 Squadron SAAF. Another source gives Axis losses as 10 destroyed and four crash landed. On 22 April, the 7 Wing sent out thirty-six P-40s which intercepted a well-escorted Italian formation. The South Africans claimed 12 Ju 52s, two SM 79s, a Ju 87 towing a glider, a Reggiane Re.2001, two Bf 109s and a Ju 88 for the loss of five Spitfires and three P-40s. Known Axis losses were 12 SM.79s and a Macchi C.202; RAF Spitfires flying from Malta shot down another two transports. Later, a flight made in daylight cost the Axis 16 or 17 Me 323 transports destroyed, plus a Macchi C.202, three German fighters and a Re-2001, when they were intercepted by 36 Australian, British and South African P-40s covered by South African, British and Polish Spitfire units.

Four P-40s were lost and one Spitfire had to force land. The main combatants in the battles were 1 Squadron SAAF, 112 Squadron RAF, 450 Squadron RAAF, I./JG 27 and II./JG 27. Göring ordered that no more transport flights be made. Albert Kesselring complained that this would deny the Axis forces supplies, and Göring once again permitted flights. This time they were to travel via Sardinia, but no more than 60–70 flights would be allowed per night; some 250 had been mounted daily before Flax. The transports also had to run the gauntlet of radar-equipped Bristol Beaufighters but these rarely were successful at intercepting them. One last Allied effort was made by 70 B-24 Liberators, which bombed airfields around Bari in Italy. Some 54 German aircraft were destroyed and 13 damaged on the ground. The USAAF units claimed 50.

== Aftermath ==
The aerial operation had a considerable effect in strangling Axis supply. The stores reaching Axis units dwindled and the Axis armies and air units remaining in Tunisia gradually ran out of fuel, ammunition and other supplies. Having lost most of its airbases, the Luftwaffe evacuated most of its units. By early May 1943, only the Italian fighter units and one German Gruppe (I./JG 77), remained as the Axis held on to a narrow strip of African coastline near Tunis. Allied air superiority was so overwhelming, that Luftwaffe personnel climbed into fighter fuselages, or squeezed into the cockpits of Bf 109s alongside the pilot rather than risk flying in transport aircraft. Most ground crew and pilots attempted to escape this way. Flying large numbers of personnel in one go and by transport was too dangerous; 16 personnel were killed in a crash on 29 or 30 April. The last transport missions were flown on 4 May, in which 117 tons of fuel and ammunition were brought in. Some supply drops were attempted (by II./Kampfgeschwader 1), but most of the remaining signals, FlaK, transport and administrative staff left were captured when the campaign ended on 13 May 1943.

== See also ==
- List of aircraft of the United Kingdom in World War II
- List of aircraft of the United States during World War II
- List of World War II military aircraft of Germany
- List of Regia Aeronautica aircraft used in World War II
- North African campaign timeline
- List of World War II Battles
