= Rodney Charles Wilson =

LGBTQ+ advocate and teacher

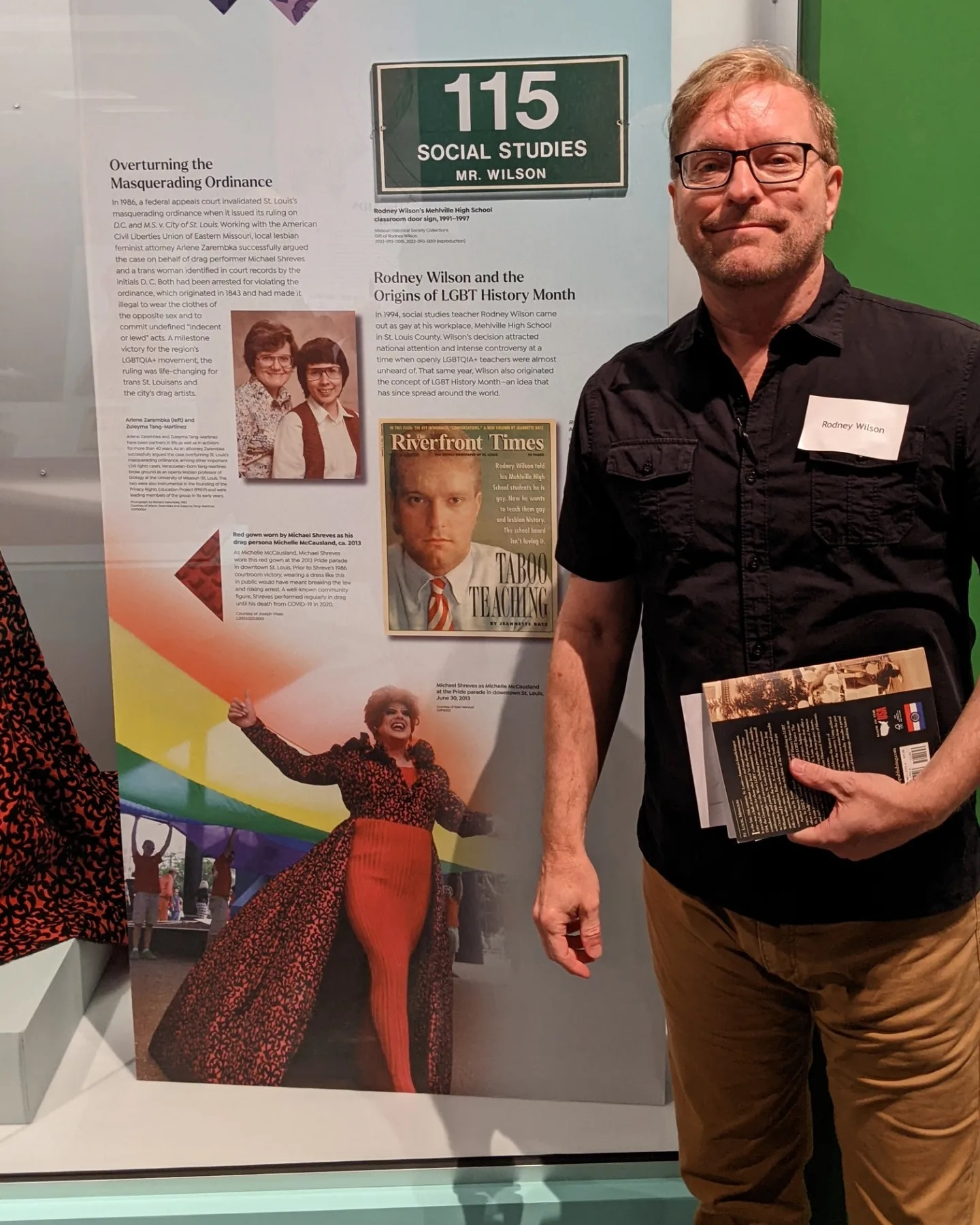
- Wilson at the Missouri History Museum in 2024
- Born: January 11, 1965 (age 61); Potosi, Missouri
- Citizenship: United States
- Known for: Founder of first LGBTQ+ History Month
- Parents: Charles Wilson (father); Patricia (Gamble) Wilson (mother)

Rodney Charles Wilson (born January 11, 1965) is an American educator, founder of the world's first LGBTQ+ History Month, and the first known openly gay public-school teacher in Missouri.

== Early life ==
Wilson was born at the Bonne Terre (Missouri) Hospital and raised in the small town of Potosi, Missouri, by his parents, Charles and Patricia (Gamble) Wilson. He has one sister.

=== Education ===
Wilson graduated from the Potosi School District in 1983; from Mineral Area College (AA, transfer studies, 1988); Southeast Missouri State University (BS, secondary social studies education, 1990); University of Missouri-St. Louis (MA, history, 1995); and Harvard University Extension School (ALM, religion, 2012).

== Coming out and activism ==
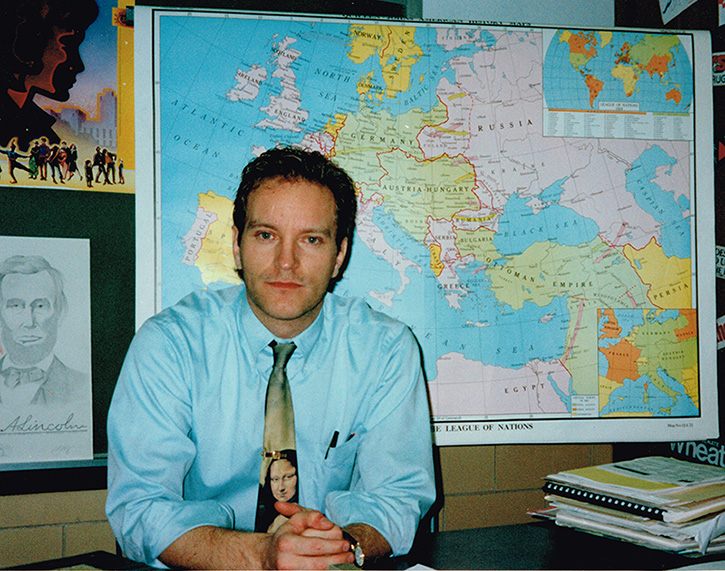
Inside Rodney Wilson's Classroom at Missouri High School (1996)

Wilson began teaching in the social studies department at Mehlville High School in suburban St. Louis in the fall of 1990. It was there in March 1994 that he became the first known openly gay teacher in Missouri public schools when he came out to his students during a lesson on the Holocaust. His story was widely covered in the St. Louis-area, including a Riverfront Times cover story and in national media, with a segment on the newsmagazine Dateline NBC.

He was an inspiration for an ABC's All My Children storyline about a gay high school history teacher, Michael Delaney, portrayed by actor Chris Bruno.

Building on his advocacy, Wilson founded GLSEN-St. Louis as the first chapter of the organization devoted to LGBTQ education advocacy to be established outside of GLSEN's origin state, Massachusetts. Additionally, Wilson was an HIV/AIDS vaccine volunteer at the Saint Louis University Center for Vaccine Development from 1992 to 1996; and a COVID-19 vaccine volunteer at the same center in 2020-21.

== LGBTQ+ History Month ==
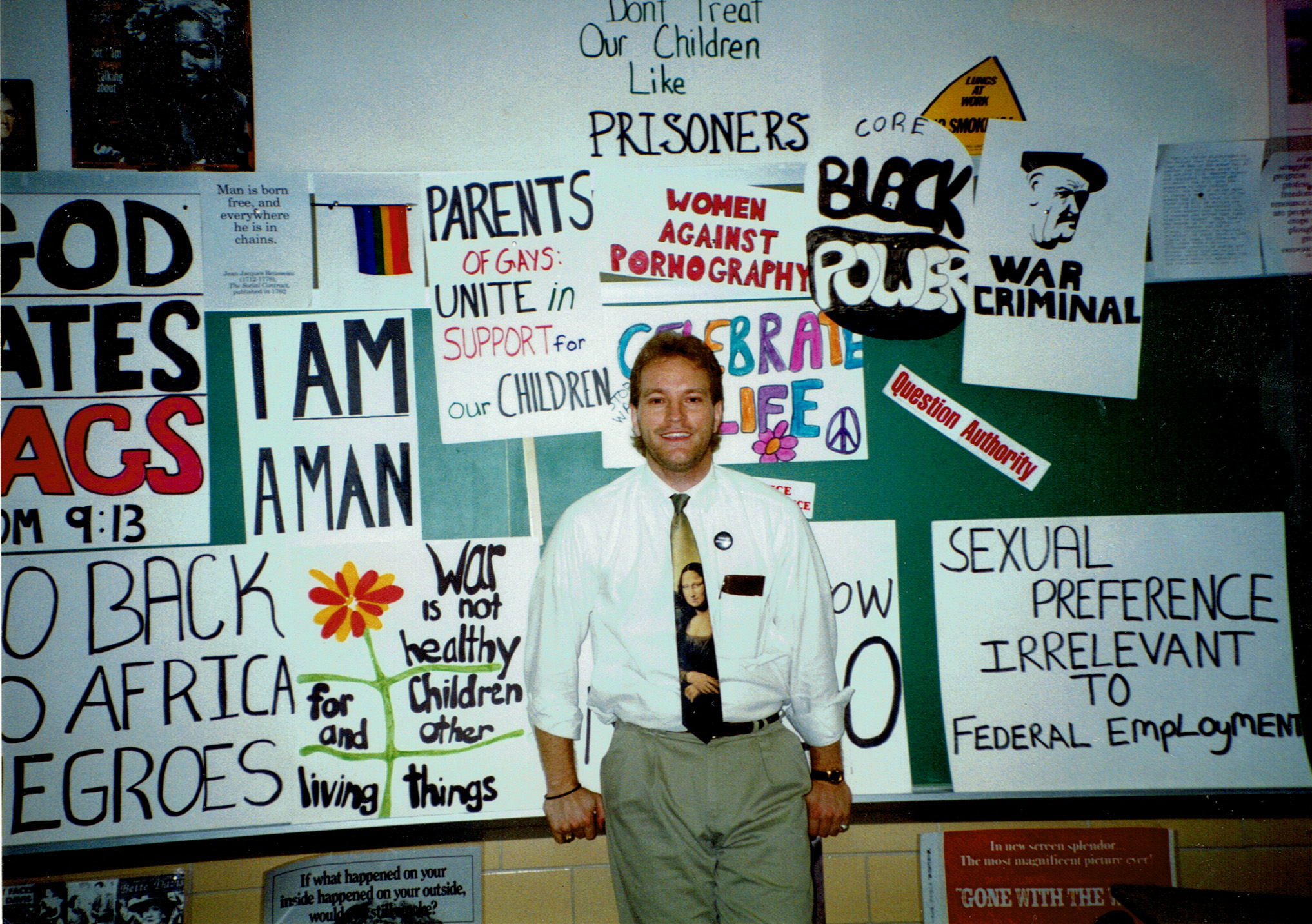
Rodney Wilson standing in front of the Poster Project (1994)

In January 1994, Wilson wrote the founding proposal for what was then called "Lesbian and Gay History Month" and was then the world's first LGBTQ+ History Month, now celebrated in two dozen locations around the world. He chose October for the USA event to commemorate the first and second marches on Washington for LGBTQ rights, in 1979 and 1987, to honor National Coming Out Day, and to place the month-long event within the academic calendar. In creating LGBTQ+ History Month, Wilson was inspired by Women's History Month and by Black History Month, especially by Dr. Carter G. Woodson.

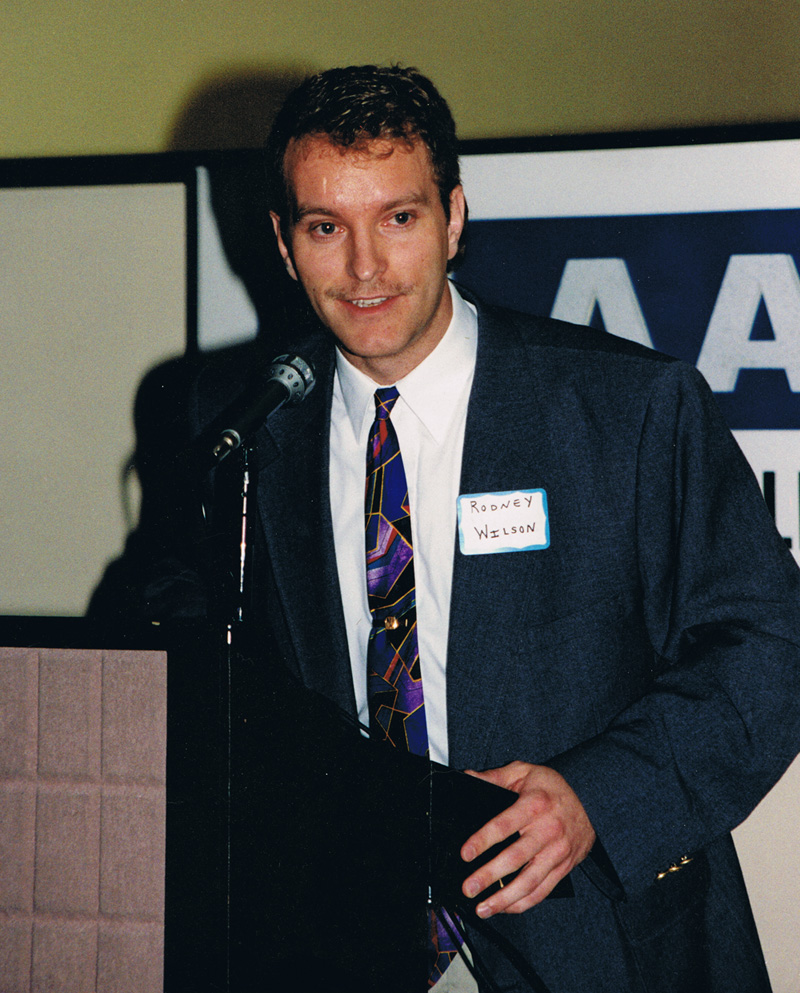
Rodney Wilson Speaking about LGBT History Month at a GLAAD function (1996)

The initial National Coordinating Committee for LGBTQ+ History Month USA, organized in the spring of 1994, consisted of founder Wilson; Johnda Boyce (women's studies graduate student at OSU and Wilson's close college friend); Kevin Boyer (president of the board of Chicago's Gerber/Hart, which served as the first institutional home for LGBTQ+ History Month); Steven Capsuto (Lesbian & Gay Library/Archives of Philadelphia); Saralyn Chestnut (director of Atlanta's Emory University's Office of Lesbian, Gay, and Bisexual Life); Jessea Greenman (Project 21, UC Berkeley); Kevin Jennings (founder of GLSEN, in Boston in 1990); and Torey Wilson (a Virginia high school teacher).

LGBTQ+ History Month was not without its critics, especially from conservative family groups such as Concerned Women for America (CWA), and including a 1995 denunciation of Wilson and his idea on the floor of the United States House of Representatives by Indiana's Congressman Dan Burton.

In 2021, Wilson originated the idea for - and co-founded with colleagues from around the world - the International Committee on LGBTQ+ History Months (ICoHM), to serve as a representative body of all the world's LGBTQ+ history months.

== Writings ==
Wilson, in 1994, wrote the first LGBTQ history article published by the Missouri Historical Society, about Rev. Carol Cureton, the 27-year-old founder in 1973 of a Metropolitan Community Church congregation in St. Louis. He has written several essays for Out in St. Louis, The Huffington Post, The Advocate, and LGBTQ Nation. He contributed chapters to One Teacher in Ten: Lesbian and Gay Educators Tell Their Stories (1994) and to Left in the Midwest: St. Louis Progressive Activism in the 1960s and 1970s (2022). He also wrote Killing God: Christian Fundamentalism and the Rise of Atheism (2015) and co-wrote with his mother Me, Mush, and Tom: Life Was a Gamble (2013), his mother's memories of growing up in 1950s rural poverty as the seventeenth of eighteen children on a small farm in Missouri, lacking indoor plumbing and electricity.

In 2026, Wilson lectured at the 1904 World’s Fair Society and at the Missouri History Museum, and spoke with St. Louis Public Radio, about his research into two jardinieres (decorative planters) that were exhibited in the German Court of Honor in the Palace of Varied Industries at the St. Louis World’s Fair, and were subsequently lost on a rural farm 85 miles south of St. Louis. His research, which uncovered for the first time both written and photographic evidence of the jardinieres on exhibit at the World’s Fair, solved a longstanding mystery about the origin and purpose of the items and about the metal sculptor Gustav Lind (1856-1903), and was published in the Spring 2026 issue of the Missouri Historical Society’s members magazine, Gateway.

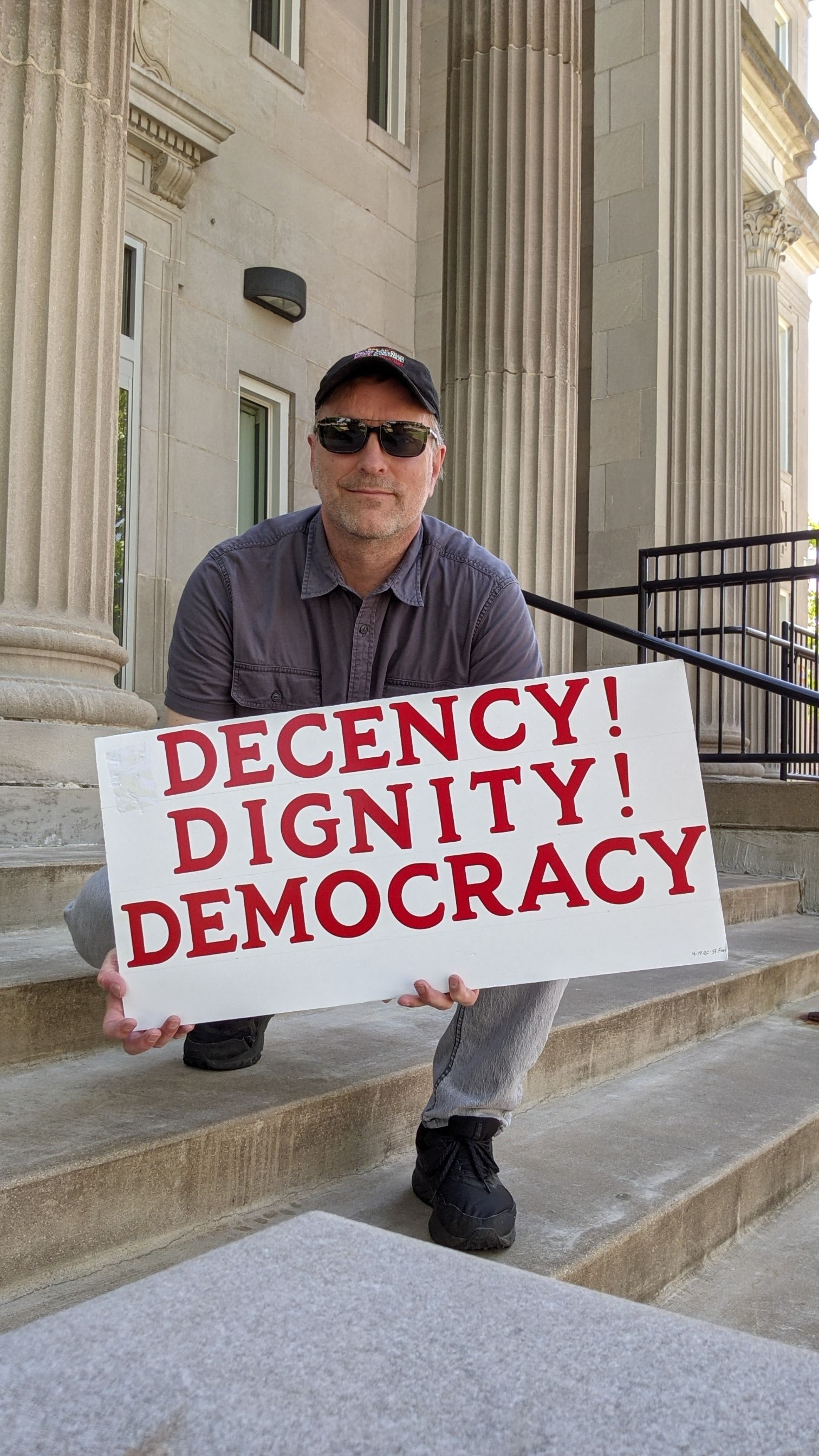
Rodney Wilson at a rally at Courthouse Square in St. Francois County (2025)

== Personal life ==
Wilson currently serves as coordinator of the department of history and political science and teaches introductory world religions and American history courses at Mineral Area College.

Wilson is among those targeted on Charlie Kirk's Turning Point USA Professor Watchlist. He has written about that experience and about the cancellation of a LGBTQ+ History Month event he was scheduled to headline, after corporate executives read his essay about being named on the Professor Watchlist and considered Wilson to be too controversial.

== Awards and honors ==
Wilson has received numerous awards, including the Torch Award from the Human Rights Campaign Fund, St. Louis chapter, in 1996; and in 1997 the Lambda Award and in 2016 the Carol Watchler Award, both from the LGBTQ+ Caucus of the National Education Association. In 2015, he was named an LGBTQ Icon by the Huffington Post and was named one of 31 LGBTQ icons during Equality Forum's LGBTQ History Month Icons Project in October 2017. In 2020, as part of Missouri's bicentennial celebration, he was named a Missouri Trailblazer by the Missouri State Museum and in 2024-25 he was featured in the Gateway to Pride exhibit at the Missouri History Museum.

Wilson is the subject of a 2019 documentary-short titled Taboo Teaching: A Profile of Missouri Teacher Rodney Wilson.

In 2026, Wilson was awarded the American Association of Community Colleges Dale P. Parnell Distinguished Faculty Award; was named Faculty Member of the Year at Mineral Area College; and was awarded the Michael Shinagel Award for Service to Others by the Harvard Extension School Alumni Association for grassroots social change by means of advocacy for LGBTQ+ education rights and the founding of LGBTQ+ History Month.
