= Paul Patrick =

English teacher & LGBT rights activist (1950-2008)

Paul Patrick at Pride London - 30 June 2007

Paul Patrick (23 July 1950, South Shields – 22 May 2008, Burnley) was an English teacher and lesbian, gay, bisexual and transgender (LGBT) rights activist. He was openly gay and focused on homophobia in the public and voluntary sectors, particularly in the education system.

== Early life ==
Patrick attended South Shields Grammar School but moved to Burnley at the age of fifteen and attended Burnley Grammar before going to Phillipa Fawcett College, London (a college of the University of London) where he studied English and drama.

== Career ==
He came out in 1969 and went on to become a teacher in 1972 at the Roger Manwood School, Lewisham. He became Head of Drama and a member of the teachers' advisory panel for Greenwich Young People's Theatre in Education Company and worked with the teachers and advisors who produced the Inner London Education Authority's "Drama Bulletin."

In 1976, he co-founded the Lewisham Association for Multicultural Education. In 1983, he became the Equal opportunities Officer for the school he had just helped into amalgamation as a member of the Crofton School Advisory Team. While continuing to teach English and Drama, he became the co-ordinator for a project bringing adults with learning disabilities into the school to use the facilities and work with pupils. This work was recognised by the Inner London Education Authority (ILEA) who appointed him an advisor for equal opportunities in the areas of Expressive Arts, particularly Drama & Theatre Studies, PHSE and the pastoral curriculum. Soon he was co-opted to the Relationships and Sexuality Project and was a member of its steering group, became the Multi-ethnic Inspectorate representative on the Authority's P.H.S.E. Advisory panel, a member of the Authority's video panel. He also worked with the ILEA publishing section to produce materials, videos and guidelines for teachers. This was until the abolition of the ILEA in 1990 when he returned to teaching English and Drama at Crofton School.

In May 1996, he took some time out to concentrate on writing and his training work and co-founded Chrysalis, a training collective with his close friend and colleague, Sue Sanders.

In 1997 he joined the staff of Accrington and Rossendale College, working first in their Student Services Department and later moving on to full-time lectureship. In September 1999 he joined their Performing Arts Team to work full-time teaching BTEC Foundation, BTEC National and HND Performing Arts. He also directed several plays including an education piece on homophobic bullying which toured local schools and was performed at teachers' conferences. He then moved to Bacup and Rawtenstall Grammar School where he taught for three years, leaving after a period of illness.

He also worked as a consultant to the Equality and Human Rights Commission.

In 2006 he taught at Ribblesdale High School Clitheroe where he used to teach drama. In 2007 he founded the Rossendale Players Youth Theatre at the Millennium Theatre in Waterfoot, Rossendale.

== Activism ==
In 1974, Paul Patrick co-founded the Gay Teachers' Group, and was its secretary until 1982. He was the first teacher in the UK to come out to parents and pupils and retain their job, and went on to be promoted. He then became the first single gay man to be allowed to foster a young heterosexual man, Roger Waters, one of his pupils.

In his work, he addressed the International Conference of Teachers of English, been the UK representative at an international conference held in Finland on the development of lesbian and gay issues in the curriculum, and been a member of the National Union of Teachers.

In 2002 he became the Co-chair of Schools Out together with Sue Sanders. He also became the Equal Opportunities Officer of the National Union of Teachers - Lancashire Division and a member of the NUT's LGBT Working Party.

Since 2004, he was a member of the Steering Group of LGBT History Month (UK) for which, together with a team of teachers, he created and vetted lessons and assembly suggestions. He also toured the country promoting LGBT History Month to a wide range of groups and organisations.

== Public appearances ==
As well as being a teacher, Paul Patrick wrote on a range of issues and sub-edited others' work. His articles were published in many prestigious publications including Gay News, The Guardian, The Times Educational Supplement, The Teacher, the Open University, Tretham Books and Multilingual Matters . He also worked on several educational video programmes.

He regularly appeared in the national press, on TV and radio programmes dealing with education, social equality and LGBT issues and fulfilled many public speaking engagements. He lectured on PGCE and MEd courses at Goldsmiths College and the Institute of Education.

In May 2002, he nominated himself to appear in the list being compiled by The Guardian of the people who have done most to shape Britain during the Queen's reign. His reasons for it being that he too, [had] been a queen for 50 years, although under somewhat less privileged circumstances. As Britain's first openly gay teacher not to be fired or moved to a 'safe' position and as a campaigner for lesbian, gay and bisexual equality for more than 30 years, I feel I have contributed a lot more to Britain than that other Queen has. I am also more attractive and a lot more fun!

== Death ==
Paul Patrick died on 22 May 2008, aged 57, after a long battle with a chronic lung condition. He was working on Biting the hand that feeds me!, his autobiography.
