= Homosexual Law Reform Society =

Organization

The Homosexual Law Reform Society was an organisation in the 20th century that campaigned in the United Kingdom for changes to the set of laws which criminalised homosexuality at the time.

== History ==
In 1954, the Conservative government set up a Departmental Committee to look into aspects of British sex laws. The resulting report, the Wolfenden Report, was published on 3 September 1957.

On 5 March 1958, the academic A.E. (Tony) Dyson wrote a letter to The Times, published on the 7th, calling for reform of the law by the implementation of the Wolfenden Committee's recommendations. The letter was signed by many distinguished people including Clement Attlee, A. J. Ayer, Isaiah Berlin, Trevor Huddleston, Julian Huxley, J. B. Priestley, Bertrand Russell, Donald Soper, Angus Wilson and Barbara Wootton.

The correspondence that this letter generated helped bring together supporters of the Wolfenden Report, and this led to the Homosexual Law Reform Society being founded on 12 May 1958 with members including Victor Gollancz, Stephen Spender, and Kenneth Younger MP. Most of the founders were not homosexual.

Advertisements inviting people who supported the Wolfenden Report to contact the Homosexual Law Reform Society resulted in Tony Dyson being joined by Antony Grey, businessman Nigel Bryant and architect Duncan Wright.

In May 1958, the related charity, the Albany Trust, was set up.

In October 1958, the Albany Trust opened an office, and the HLRS was able to use these facilities for its campaigning work.

The pamphlet Homosexuals and the Law was sent to MPs in preparation for their first debate on the Wolfenden Report. The first parliamentary debate was initiated on 4 December 1957 by Frank Pakenham (Baron Pakenham, later known as Lord Longford); however, it had become clear that the government had shelved the report and was not planning to implement any reform. The Lord Chancellor, Viscount Kilmuir, had said, "I am not going down in history as the man who made sodomy legal."

On 12 May 1960, over 1,000 people attended the first HLRS public meeting in Caxton Hall in central London.

In 1962, Antony Grey became acting secretary of the HLRS. In the spring of 1963, this became a full appointment. Some people questioned the appropriateness of this appointment since Grey was a homosexual who was living with another man; there was concern that he might be subject to the same type of police attention that the organisation was campaigning against.

In 1963, the HLRS expanded to become a nationwide campaign, forming the North-Western Homosexual Law Reform Committee (NWHLRC) in Manchester under the leadership of Allan Horsfall. The North-Western Committee was the most radical and proactive of the HLRS’ groups, targeting trade unions and industrial workplaces and raising awareness of the Wolfenden Report. The NWC eventually formed the committee, then formed the Campaign for Homosexual Equality.

The HLRS was most active during the campaign which led to the passing of the Sexual Offences Act 1967. For example, they provided advice and support to the Dorian Society of New Zealand; however, many (in particular the Campaign for Homosexual Equality and the Gay Liberation Front) considered that the new law did not go far enough and blamed the HLRS for what they saw as a weakening of the Wolfenden Committee's proposals, calling the HLRS/Albany Trust "a conformist outfit of Uncle Toms".

In March 1970, the HLRS became the Sexual Law Reform Society (SLRS) in order to campaign for further legal changes, particularly relating to the age of consent. In 1974, it produced a report for the Criminal Law Revision Committee on lowering the age of consent to 14, with the requirement that below the age of 18 the burden of proof that consent for sexual activities between the parties existed would be the responsibility of the older participant.

A. J. Ayer was President of the HLRS for a time; he remarked that "as a notorious heterosexual I could never be accused of feathering my own nest."

== See also ==
- Age-of-consent reform in the United Kingdom
- LGBT rights in the United Kingdom
- List of LGBT rights organisations
- Timeline of LGBT history in the United Kingdom
