= Antony Grey =

LGBT rights activist (1927–2010)

- Born: Anthony Edgar Gartside Wright; 6 October 1927; Wilmslow, United Kingdom
- Died: 30 April 2010 (aged 82); London, United Kingdom
- Education: Magdalene College, Cambridge
- Occupations: Journalist; Gay rights activist

Anthony Edgar Gartside Wright (6 October 1927 – 30 April 2010), better known by his pseudonym Antony Grey, was an English LGBT rights activist. Grey was credited by Lord Arran to have "done more than any single man to bring this social problem to the notice of the public".

== Early life ==
Grey was born in Wilmslow, Cheshire on 6 October 1927 to Alex Wright, a chartered accountant, and Gladys Rihan, who was half-Syrian. After attending Norwood College in Harrogate, North Yorkshire, and Millfield School in Street, Somerset, he read history at Magdalene College, Cambridge.

== Career ==
Grey began working as a journalist in Yorkshire before moving to London to study law. From 1949, he worked as a press officer for the British Iron and Steel Federation, later merged into British Steel Corporation, where he claimed to have learned the lobbying techniques he later applied so successfully. He remained there for 12 years. Though he was called to the bar, he never practised law.

Grey began his career as an advocate for gay rights with a letter to the Sunday Times in 1954. In 1958, Grey started voluntary work for the Homosexual Law Reform Society (HLRS). He became the Society's Honorary Treasurer in 1960 and its Secretary by the end of 1962, giving up his media career. At this time he also became Secretary of the Albany Trust. Following his mother's request not to use his family name (Edgar Wright) or to embarrass his father or family with his campaigning work for gay rights he chose to be known as Antony Grey, because of his conviction that there are no entirely black or white issues in life.

Grey campaigned tirelessly for the law reforms advocated by the 1957 Wolfenden report, wrote many articles, made numerous speeches to interested groups, lobbied MPs, and organised action to promote the passage of the Sexual Offences Act 1967 (the "Arran/Abse Sexual Offences Act") through Parliament until it became law in 1967. One historian has written that "Grey was widely acknowledged as a key player in spearheading the campaigns that culminated in this victory." Grey subsequently undertook a speaking tour of the US to share his experience with American activists. Reflecting at the time on the moderate politics of the British movement for gay and lesbian rights compared with their US counterparts, Grey said: "it's inconceivable that such a group as the Mattachine Society would exist here. I'd say it won't happen for at least five years."

In the New Oxford History of England, Sir Brian Harrison observes that Grey's "rare combination of high-serious commitment, shrewd political effectiveness, and total lack of self-advertisement was precious indeed" to the movement for law reform.

In 1970 he became Secretary of the Sexual Law Reform Society, the successor to the HLRS, and was Director of the Albany Trust from 1971 to 1977. He remained a patron until his death.

Following his retirement from the Albany Trust in 1977, he became involved in counselling (obtaining a diploma in counselling skills) and training work and was for some years a member of the executive committee of the British Association for Counselling. He was also an executive committee member of the Defence of Literature and the Arts Society (now the Campaign Against Censorship) and of the National Council for Civil Liberties (now Liberty). Grey appeared in the BBC Radio 4 documentary The BBC and the Closet in 2008.

A committed humanist, Grey advocated a rational and humanistic approach, both as a general worldview and also as an approach to policy and social attitudes pertaining to homosexuality. Carefully debunking commonly held myths around homosexuality, Grey's pamphlet 'Being Rational About Being Gay' opposed as 'ungrounded' the basis of homophobia and discrimination towards sexual minorities, a theme he attributed to his humanist beliefs.

He met his life-partner Eric Thompson in 1960, seven years before male homosexual activities were decriminalised in England, and they lived together for 50 years. The two became civil partners in 2005, on the second day that civil partnerships were legal.

== Death ==
Antony Grey died on 30 April 2010 at the King Edward VII hospital in London, after a long fight against leukaemia. He expressed specific wishes that his body should be cremated and his ashes scattered without any religious ceremony or memorial service. He was survived by his partner, Eric Thompson.

His papers are in the custody of the Hall–Carpenter Archives collection of material on gay activism in London. Grey was a prolific writer and media campaigner on a wide range of civil liberties issues.

== Awards ==
In 1995, Grey was awarded the Pink Paper Lifetime Achievement Award.

In 2007, for the 40th anniversary of the partial decriminalisation of homosexuality in the UK, he became Stonewall Hero of the Year. In his acceptance speech, he said:

The road to homosexual emancipation which I and a few others embarked upon following the Wolfenden Report has been a long and arduous one. But now here we are, and we can be thankful for what has been achieved. At least, we are able to celebrate our identities in this magnificent building [the Victoria & Albert Museum], instead of being thrown off the top of it for being who we are – as some of our enemies would like to happen. But "the price of liberty is eternal vigilance," and ours is a never-ending struggle not just for our own rights, but for human rights.

== Selected works ==
- History of the British Steel Industry by J. C. Carr and W. Taplin, assisted by A. E. G. Wright (Blackwell, 1962)
- The Development of the Modern Steel Industry by B. S. Keeling and A. E. G. Wright (Longmans, 1964)
- "Towards a Sexually Sane Society" (1963), a speech published in Robert B. Ridinger, ed., Speaking for Our Lives: Historic Speeches and Rhetoric for Gay and Lesbian Rights: (1892-2000) (Harrington Park Press, 2004)
- Sex, Morality & Happiness, Concern: Newsletter of the Southern California Council on Religion and the Homophile (Issue #8, June 1968)
- The citizen in the street: An address by Antony Grey (An Albany Trust Talking Point) (1969)
- "The Church's Role after Law Reform," in W. Dwight Oberholtzer, ed., Is Gay Good?: Ethics, Theology, and Homosexuality (1971)
- Quest for Justice: Towards Homosexual Emancipation (Sinclair Stevenson, 1992)
- Speaking of Sex: The Limits of Language (Cassell, 1993)
- Why Pornography Should Not Be Censored (1993)
- Speaking Out: Writings on Sex, Law, Politics, and Society, 1954-95 (Cassell, 1997)
- A review of Love Undetectable: reflections on friendship, sex and survival, by Andrew Sullivan (1999)
- Personal Tapestry (One Roof Press, 2008)
