= Campaign for Homosexual Equality =

British advocacy group

Campaign for Homosexual Equality (CHE)
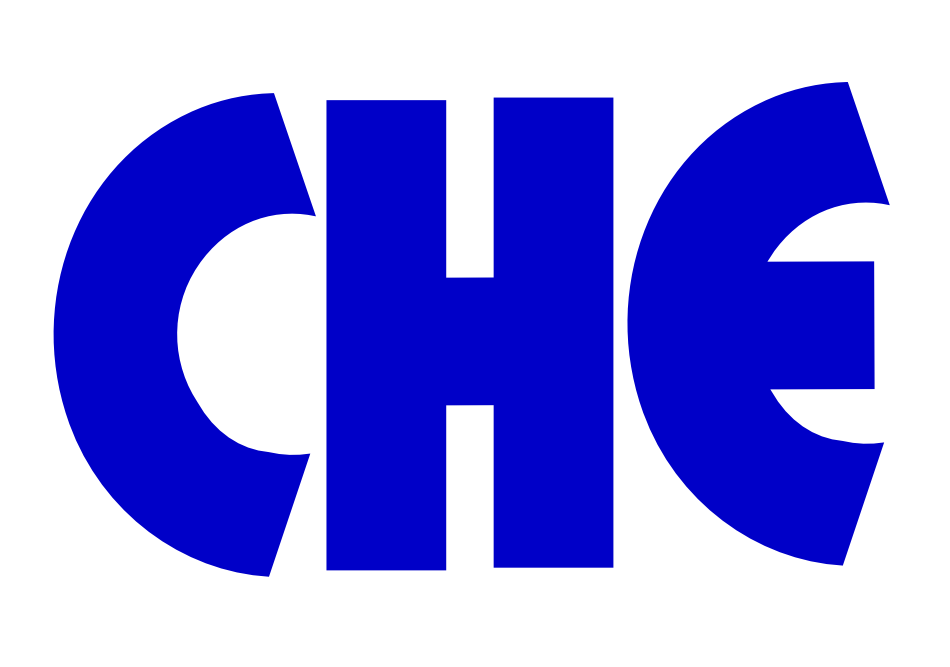
- CHE logo
- Founded: 7 October 1964
- Founder: Allan Horsfall and Colin Harvey
- Location: London, United Kingdom
- Origins: Homosexual Law Reform Society
- Website: www.c-h-e.org.uk
- Formerly called: North-Western Homosexual Law Reform Committee (NWHLRC; 1964–1969); Committee for Homosexual Equality (CHE; 1969–1971)

The Campaign for Homosexual Equality (CHE) was a membership organisation in the United Kingdom with a stated aim from 1969 to promote legal and social equality for lesbians, gay men and bisexuals in England and Wales. Active throughout the 1970s – and becoming a mass-membership organisation during this time – CHE's membership declined in the 1980s.

CHE set up a research trust in 2021 to 'advance education for the public benefit about the history of the struggle for LGBT+ rights, including but not limited to the origins and history of the Campaign for Homosexual Equality and by contributing to the safe preservation of LGBT+ archives'. The CHE Research Trust (CHERT) was registered as a charity on 11 March 2022.

== History ==
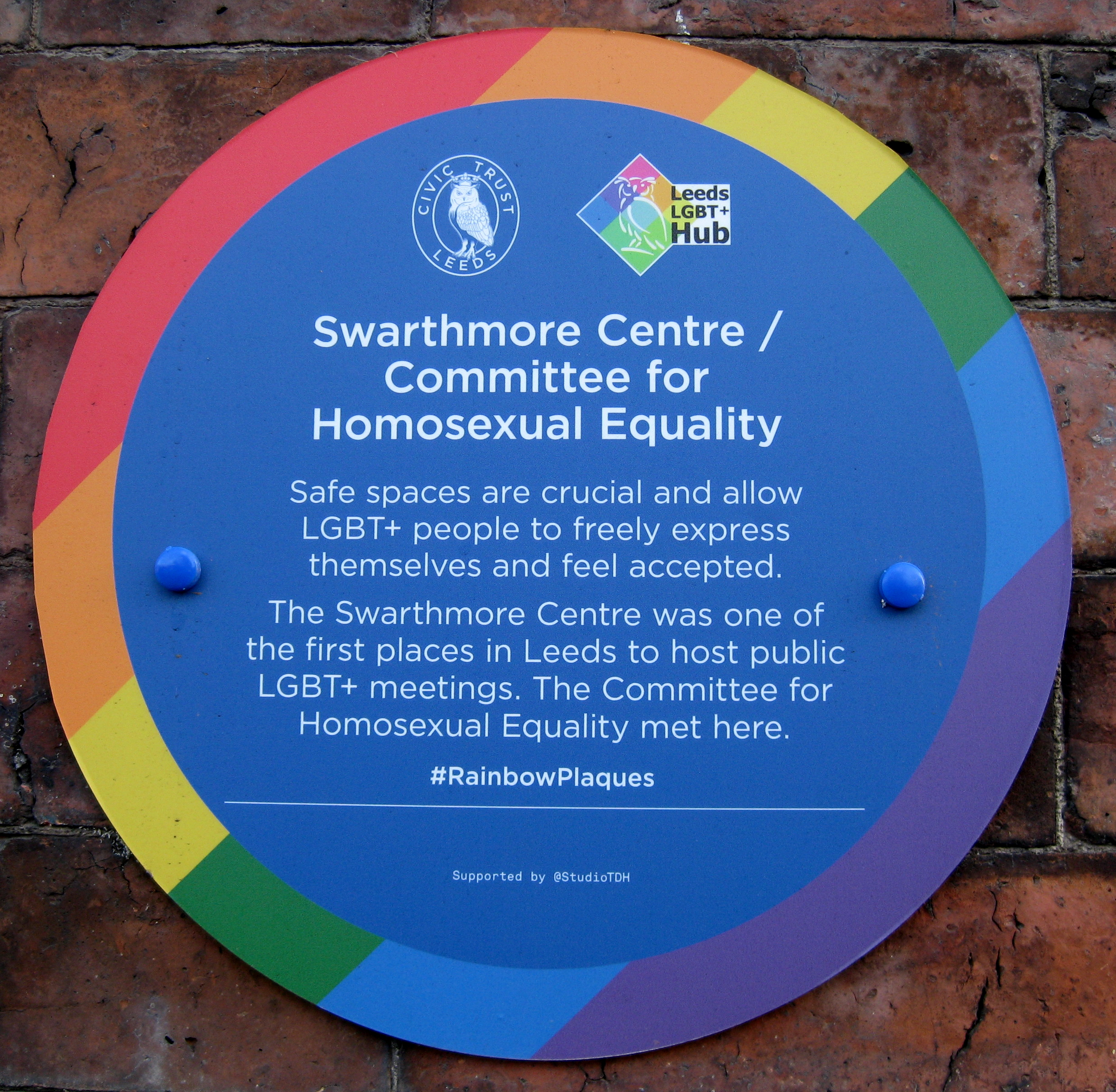
One of fifteen sponsored memorials on Leeds Rainbow Plaque Trail, in aid of Leeds Pride, commemorating the Swarthmore Centre as safe space in 1971 where the group met.

CHE began in Manchester as the North-Western Homosexual Law Reform Committee in 1964 as a local branch of the Homosexual Law Reform Society. An initial meeting was held on 4 June 1964, but only about eight people attended. A decision was made to re-establish the group on a wider basis, and an "advisory group" formed. This group chose the name "North-Western Homosexual Law Reform Committee". The new group was launched at Church House, Deansgate, Manchester, on 7 October 1964. Allan Horsfall was its secretary and most visible member. In 1969, the NWHLRC was renamed the Committee for Homosexual Equality with aims to becoming a national body for England and Wales. The group met at the Swarthmoor Centre in Leeds in 1971 and, later in the same year, changed its name to the Campaign for Homosexual Equality (CHE).

London Friend was set up in London in 1972 intended to provide counselling. In 1972, CHE members took part in the first London Pride at Hyde Park, followed by a march to Trafalgar Square, nominally to protest at the age of consent, then age 21. That year, CHE had become the largest lesbian and gay rights organisation in the country, representing a more reformist goal than the liberationist Gay Liberation Front. By 1973, it held the first national gay rights conference in Morecambe. In this period, CHE claimed 5,000 members and some 100 local groups.

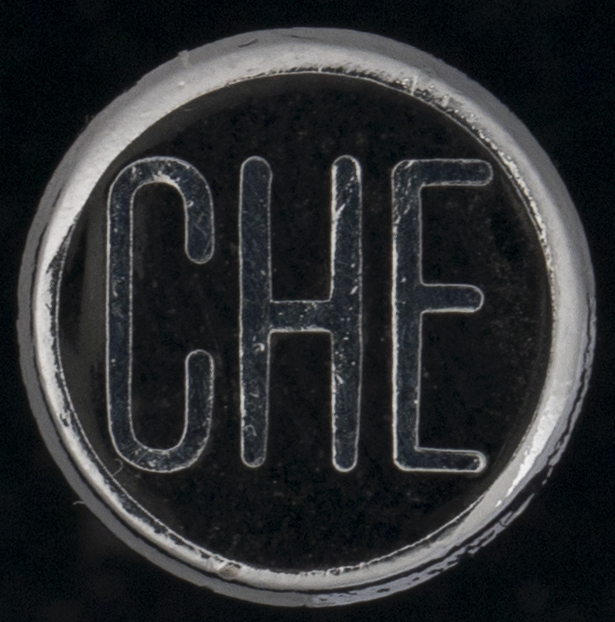
Campaign for Homosexual Equality (CHE) badge

In 1974, CHE appeared alongside London Friend in a documentary titled Speak for Yourself produced by London Weekend Television. At this time, the organisation's offices were at 22 Great Windmill Street, London. The offices of London Friend were at 47 Church St, London NW8. The organisations worked closely together through social events. CHE at the time had 4000 members and was involved in campaigns and politics, whereas Friend was a counselling service. It organised a national Homosexual Equality Rally in London. The rally was supported by the women's movement and people from ethnic minorities. Where earlier actions had concentrated on legal protection from criminal persecution, this rally was part of gay and lesbian people starting to establish a distinct sexual identity. Those who turned out for the rally did so to support the extension of constitutional rights and universal values to lesbian and gay people. CHE and London Friend shared offices and had close links until 1974. Friend was separated from CHE in 1975.

In May 1974, CHE’s Working Party on Law Reform proposed lowering the age of consent to sixteen, or twelve in some legal cases. At the time 200–300 youth, mostly young men between 16–20 years old, were being prosecuted for consensual homosexual acts every year. After internal review, in 1973, the idea of twelve for age of consent was dropped. In 1972, there was movement by heterosexual activists to make their age of consent fourteen. In 1977, CHE passed a resolution at its conference, “supported by the vast majority of delegates”, which condemned press harassment of the Paedophile Information Exchange.

At a fringe meeting of the organisation held in Coventry in 1978, a new separate international organisation was formed, named ILGA, which later became International Lesbian, Gay, Bisexual, Trans and Intersex Association.

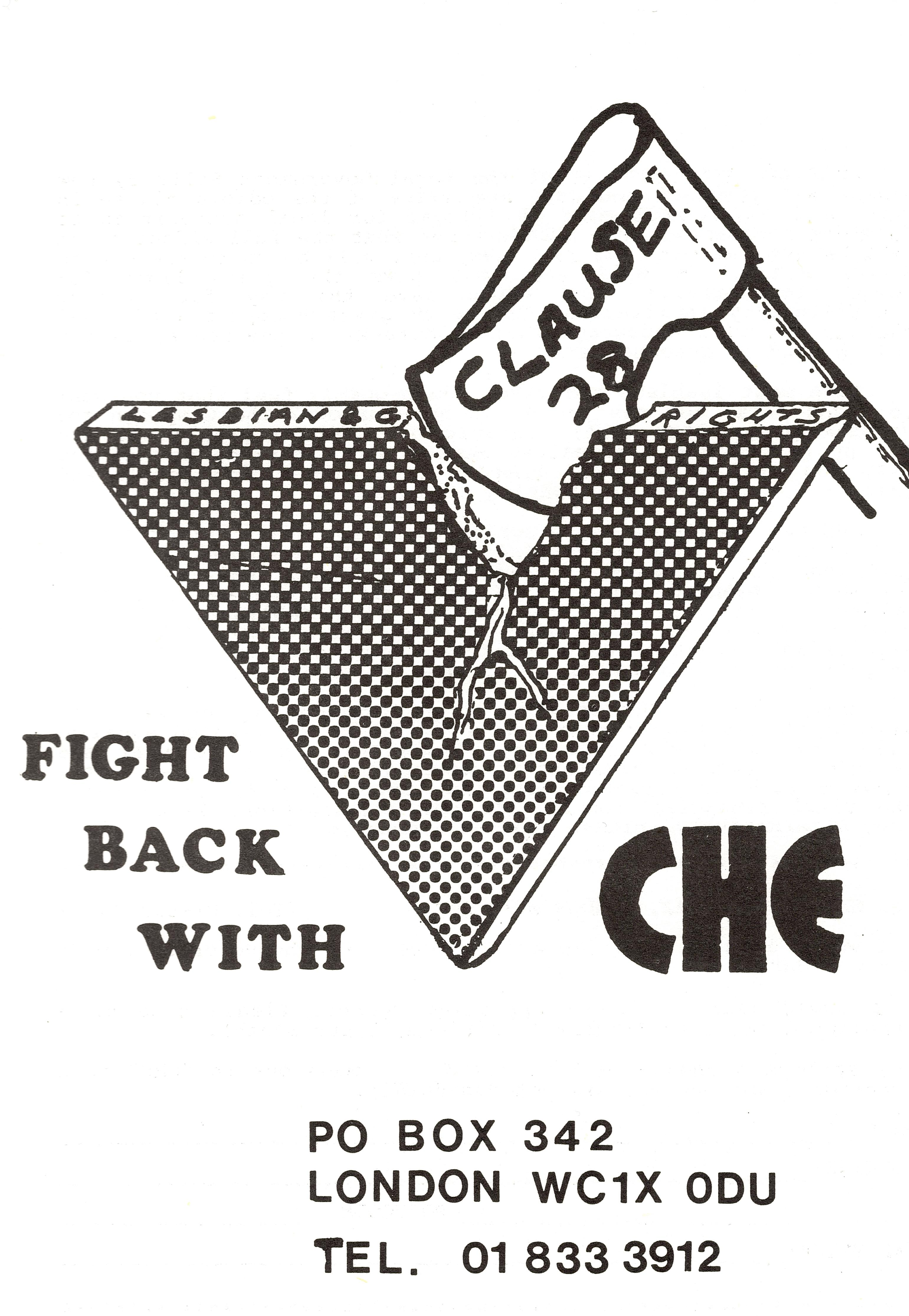
CHE leaflet against Section 28, 1988

In 1979, its offices were moved from Manchester to London. In the 1980s, the group campaigned for further law reform and on issues such as Section 28. That decade, the CHE decided to focus on campaigning and diverted its attention away from local groups; this led to a loss in membership during the decade.

In 2005, the organisation received a substantial bequest from a former member, Derek Oyston of Gateshead. In early 2009, the organisation was campaigning to prevent cases of historic child sex abuse being prosecuted if raised more than five years after the young person gained age of majority; this, alongside issues relating to CHE's membership, "governance, constitution, electoral process policy-making process [and] financial transparency" led to its being disaffiliated from Liberty.

Lord Smith of Finsbury became a vice-president of CHE in February 2009. In 2010, the organisation commissioned a book titled Amiable Warriors: A Space to Breathe, 1954 - 1973, by Peter Scott-Presland to write their own account of the organisation's history.

The organisation received the 2014 Alan Turing Memorial Award as part of the Homo Heroes Awards ceremony organised by the Lesbian and Gay Foundation. From 2015, the organisation has stated on its page that it "no longer has the resources to offer assistance to individuals experiencing discrimination, whether in the UK or elsewhere."

== See also ==
- Tory Campaign for Homosexual Equality (TORCHE)
- LGBT rights in the United Kingdom
- List of LGBT rights organizations
