= ILGA consultative status controversy =

Controversy surrounding the ILGA's consultative status in the UN ECOSOC

In 1991, the International Lesbian and Gay Association (ILGA) applied for consultative status with the UN Economic and Social Council (ECOSOC) as a non-governmental organization; its application was initially deferred due to opposition from several member states. The application was finally approved at the ECOSOC meeting of 30 July 1993, with only Syria, Malaysia, Swaziland and Togo voting against it.

However, that status was suspended on 16 September 1994 after a campaign led by conservative US senator Jesse Helms focusing on the membership in ILGA of the North American Man/Boy Love Association (NAMBLA) and other pro-pedophilia groups. Helms introduced a bill to cut funding to the United Nations unless it could certify that it did not grant any official status to "any organization which promotes, condones or seeks the legalization of pedophilia"; it was unanimously approved by the senate. NAMBLA had been an ILGA member for approximately 15 years. According to Hans Hjerpekjon, then secretary-general of ILGA, NAMBLA had joined the group early in its history when it was loosely organized and lacked any formal admission criteria, with its inclusion becoming a source of increasing discomfort over the years. Despite ILGA adopting a resolution condemning pedophilia in 1990, the organizations in question had never resigned their membership.

On November 7, 1993, ILGA's Secretariat Committee adopted a motion urging NAMBLA to resign its ILGA membership, and refunding NAMBLA's membership dues for that year; the Committee lacked the authority to expel a member, but proposed that if NAMBLA did not heed the call to resign, then it would urge ILGA's next world conference, scheduled for June 1994, to do so.

NAMBLA rejected the Committee's call to voluntarily resign; in response, on June 30, 1994, ILGA's 17th World Conference expelled (by a vote of 214–30) NAMBLA, Vereniging MARTIJN and Project Truth, because they were judged to be "groups whose predominant aim is to support or promote pedophilia." In October 1994, the executive committee of ILGA suspended the membership of VSG (Association for Sexual Equality), a gay group in Munich, Germany, due to its vocal solidarity with NAMBLA and its refusal to purge pedophile members. Its membership was suspended until the next Annual Conference of ILGA in June 1995 when the matter could be dealt with in accordance to ILGA's constitution, namely, expulsion. VSG left ILGA in April 1995 and in 1998 dissolved itself.

ILGA applied to have its consultative status reinstated in 2000, but on 30 April 2002 the United Nations' Economic & Social Council voted 29–17 not to grant this application, "based on concerns raised about its member organizations or subsidiaries that promoted or condoned paedophilia".

One of the issues of concern was whether it was possible to verify that links with NAMBLA had effectively been severed due to ILGA not publishing its organisation membership list given fears for the safety of members living in countries where homosexuality is still criminalised.

On 3 May 2003, ECOSOC voted to again decline consultative status to ILGA. ILGA submitted another application, along with another LGBT rights organisation but it was rejected on 23 January 2006 at the Committee of NGOs. ILGA keeps the view that the summary dismissal of LGBT rights organisations' applications was influenced by Egypt and the Organisation of Islamic Cooperation (OIC).

- Ten countries voting against ILGA's application for ECOSOC included those that have the most negative evaluation by ILGA in its yearly report against discriminations of people living with HIV/AIDS: Cameroon, China, Cuba, Iran, Pakistan, Russian Federation, Senegal, Sudan, United States of America, Zimbabwe;
- Supportive states included: Chile, France, Germany, Peru, Romania;
- Colombia, India, Turkey abstained;
- Ivory Coast representative was not present.

However, in the subsequent vote on the candidature of ILGA-Europe, the U.S. reversed its position, though the proposal was still defeated, with:

- 9 countries opposing ECOSOC consultative status (Cameroon, China, Côte d'Ivoire, Iran, Pakistan, Russian Federation, Senegal, Sudan, Zimbabwe) and
- 7 in support (Chile, Colombia, France, Germany, Peru, Romania, United States);
- 2 abstentions (India, Turkey).

On 11 December 2006, ILGA-Europe (along with LSVD and LBL) were successful in being granted ECOSOC consultative status.

ILGA continued to state its opposition to pedophilia and continued to seek ECOSOC Consultative status with the UN, applying once more in May 2009. The UN NGO Committee discussed ILGA's most recent application during its sessions in May 2010 and February 2011. During this session, the Belgian Mission at the UN asked for a vote on ILGA's application, because "The organization had applied for over ten years and met all prerequisites under the resolution. While aware of the divergent views on the organization, he asked that, given the NGO's lengthy history, the Committee make a decision during the current session." A "no-action" motion, presented by the Sudanese Representative to counter Belgium's request for a vote, passed with nine Committee members voting in favour (Burundi, China, Morocco, Nicaragua, Pakistan, Russian Federation, Senegal, Sudan and Venezuela), seven voting against (Belgium, Bulgaria, India, Israel, Turkey, Peru and United States), with Kyrgyzstan abstaining and Mozambique and Cuba not present.

On 25 July 2011, ILGA as a whole were successful in being granted ECOSOC consultative status, with a vote of 29 in favour, 14 against, 5 abstentions, and 6 absent or not voting.

== See also ==
- LGBTQI+ rights at the United Nations
