= Caine Youngman =

Human rights activist

- Born: Francistown, Botswana
- Occupation: Human rights activist
- Organization: LEGABIBO
- Known for: Work in the LGBT rights movement in Botswana
- Website: caineyoungman.com

Caine Youngman (born in Francistown) is a human rights activist and member of the LGBT rights movement in Botswana. He first gained international attention in 2011 when he tried to overturn the country's ban on same-sex relations. He worked for human rights group LEGABIBO (Lesbians, Gays & Bisexuals of Botswana) until December 2022 and served on the board of Pan Africa ILGA, the regional chapter of the International Lesbian, Gay, Bisexual, Trans and Intersex Association.

Youngman was involved in court cases forcing the Botswana government to legally register LEGABIBO and to decriminalise consensual same-sex relations.

== Activism ==
Youngman joined LEGABIBO in 2005, where he was the head of policy and legal advocacy. He left the organisation in 2022 to move abroad. He has been involved in strategic litigation efforts to improve the legal situation of LGBT people in Botswana. In 2009 he announced a lawsuit to challenge Botswana's ban of consensual same-sex relations, which was filed in 2011 but then withdrawn to collect additional information for a higher chance of success. When an evangelical group compared homosexuality to incest and the deputy speaker of Botswana's National Assembly called gay people "demonic and evil", Youngman criticized these statements as "disrespectful, hateful and ignorant". He criticised that gay people were marginalised and intimated during meetings for Botswana's constitutional review process in 2022.

In a court case forcing the Botswana government to register LEGABIBO in 2014, he was among the litigants and described the government's refusal as a violation of their "rights to equality, freedom of expression and freedom of assembly and association." The government had refused to register the group for nine years. Through LEGABIBO, Youngman was involved in the Botswana High Court case that decriminalised consensual same-sex relations in 2019. The case was seen as a landmark ruling with relevance for other African countries. Youngman criticized the attorney general when the state appealed the court decision.

In a live radio debate in 2016, American pastor Steven Anderson verbally attacked Youngman for his sexual orientation and called on the Botswana government to kill homosexuals. After the broadcast, then-president Ian Khama ordered Anderson's deportation for hate speech. At an event with U.S. ambassador to Germany Richard Grenell, Youngman called on the United States to stop American evangelical pastors in Africa from "pushing our governments to either enforce sodomy laws or toughen them up and have the death penalty as a law for the LGBTI (community)."

Youngman believes that local LGBT activism must not be overshadowed by foreign donors. In his activism, he uses Setswana expressions for English terms like sexual orientation and works with representatives from across society, including religious leaders and traditional chiefs. He served on the board of Pan-Africa ILGA, the regional chapter of the International Lesbian, Gay, Bisexual, Trans and Intersex Association, and is a trustee for The Other Foundation. In 2016, he was featured on the BBC World News programme "Working Lives".

== Personal life ==
Youngman realised he was gay in primary school. Many relatives learned about his sexual orientation when he announced his lawsuit in 2009. He has stated that he always felt supported by his Catholic family. He got married outside Botswana in 2019 and left the country in 2022.
