= List of pedophile advocacy organizations =

This is a list of current and former pedophile advocacy groups.

== Organizations by country ==
=== International ===
- Newgon Organization. An online group that advocates for pedophile rights and circulates accounts on child molestation.
- Ipce (formerly International Pedophile and Child Emancipation; changed its name in 1998 for public relations reasons). It was founded in the early 1990s. As of 2005, it had 79 members in 20 countries.

=== Australia ===
- Australasian Man/Boy Love Association (AMBLA). An associate of Ipce.
- Australian Paedophile Support Group (APSG). Founded in 1980 or 1983. Its membership was very small. It was disbanded due to police activity and succeeded by the Boy Lovers and Zucchini Eaters (BLAZE). This group was also dismantled by police.

=== Belgium ===
- Dokumentatiedienst Pedofilie.
- Centre de recherche et d'information sur l'enfance et la sexualité (fr), 1982–1986. Founded by Philippe Charpentier. The group published the magazine L'Espoir.
- Fach Und Selbsthilfegruppe Paedophilie. Founded in the early 1970s.
- Stiekum.
- Studiegroep Pedofilie. Defunct.

=== Canada ===
- Coalition Pédophile Québécois. Associated with Ipce.
- Fondation Nouvelle. Defunct.

=== Denmark ===
- Danish Pedophile Association (DPA), 1985–2004.

=== France ===
- Groupe de recherche pour une enfance différente (GRED), 1979–1987. The group published the bulletin Le Petit Gredin (The Little Rogue).

=== Germany ===
- AG-Pädo. Founded in 1991 by the association Arbeitsgruppe des Bundesverbandes Homosexualität.
- Aktion Freis Leben (AFL).
- Arbeitskreis Päderastie-Pädophilie (APF). Active in the early 1980s.
- Arbeitsgemeinschaft Humane Sexualität (AHS).
- Arbeitsgemeinschaft "Schwule, Päderasten und Transsexuelle" ("Working Group 'Gays, Pederasts and Transsexuals'"). A 1980s faction of the German Green Party involved in pro-pedophile activism. Now defunct and viewed with embarrassment.
- Deutsche Studien- und Arbeitsgemeinschaft Pädophilie (DSAP). 1979–1983.
- Fach und Selbsthilfegruppe Paedophilie.
- Indianerkommune. Active from the 1970s through the mid-1980s. Commune that pressured the Green Party, sometimes violently, for what it considered to be children's liberation.
- Kanalratten. Offshoot of the Indianerkommune but for female pedophiles.
- Krumme 13 (K13).
- Pädogruppe, Rat und Tat-Zentrum.
- Pädophile Selbsthilfe- und Emanzipationsgruppe München (SHG). Starting in 2003, police began raiding its members, resulting in more than half a million items of child pornography seized and multiple arrests.
- Verein für sexuelle Gleichberechtigung. Founded in Munich. 1973–1988.

=== Italy ===
- Gruppo P. Founded by Francesco Vallini, who was a journalist at the gay magazine Babilonia. He and ten others associated with Gruppo P were arrested in 1993. At the time, the magazine's editorial staff defended him. The group published the bulletin Corriere del pedofili.

=== Netherlands ===
- Jon. Founded in 1979 by the Dutch Society for Sexual Reform.
- Party for Neighbourly Love, Freedom and Diversity, 2006–2010; 2020–2022. Dutch political party that advocated for lowering the legal age of consent to 12 years old (with the goal of eventually abolishing it) and legalizing child pornography. It never participated in any elections and had only four known members.
- Vereniging Martijn. Founded in 1982. On 27 June 2012, a Dutch court ruled that the group was illegal and ordered it to disband immediately. However, this decision was overturned by a higher court in April 2013. The judge motivated their decision by stating that the club did not commit crimes and had the right of freedom of association. This was itself overturned by the Dutch Supreme Court on 18 April 2014, reinstating the trial judge's order and banning the organization for trivializing and glorifying pedophilic acts. The association filed an appeal at the European Court of Human Rights but it was rejected. The group published OK Magazine.

=== Norway ===
- Norwegian Pedophile Group.
- Amnesty for Child Sexuality.

=== Switzerland ===
- Schweizerische Arbeitsgemeinschaft Pädophile.

=== United Kingdom ===
- Paedophile Action for Liberation, formed in 1974, merged with PIE in 1975.
- Paedophile Information Exchange (PIE), 1974–1984.

=== United States ===
- Childhood Sensuality Circle (CSC). Founded in 1971 in San Diego, California, by a student of Wilhelm Reich. Defunct by the mid-1980s.
- North American Man/Boy Love Association (NAMBLA). 1978–present. Considered to be largely defunct.
- Project Truth. One of the organizations which was expelled from ILGA in 1994 for being a pedophile organization.
- René Guyon Society. Most investigators considered it a one-man propaganda operation. Its slogan was said to be "sex before eight, or else it's too late." Defunct by the mid-1980s.
