= Bill Andriette =

American journalist and pro-pedophilia activist

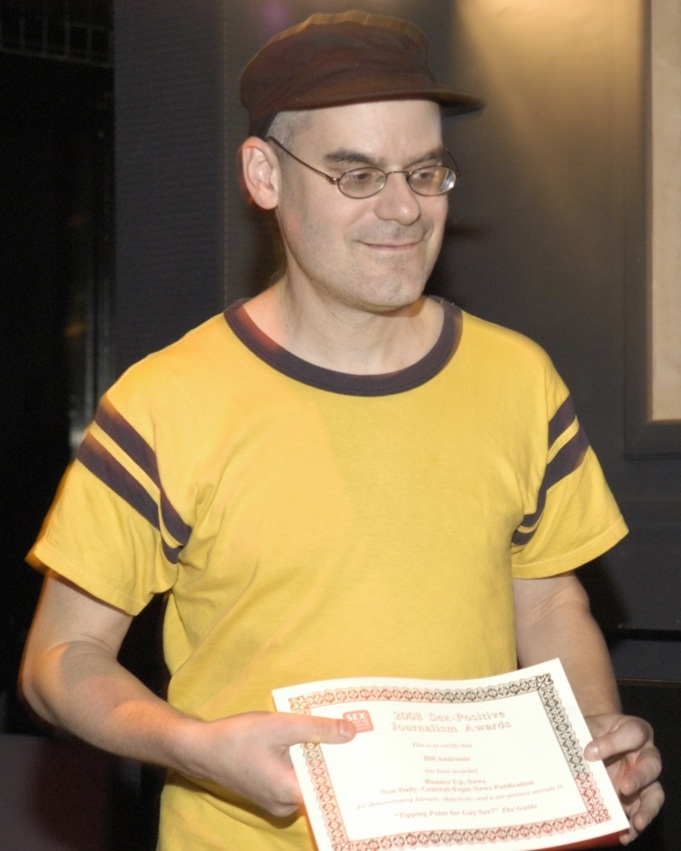
- Born: 1965 (age 60–61)
- Education: Cornell University
- Occupation: Journalist

Bill Andriette is an American journalist and pro-pedophile activist.

== Biography ==
Andriette was the art director for the LGBT periodical Baltimore Outloud, and was previously the Features Editor of The Guide, a gay travel and entertainment magazine published in Boston. As of 1996, he was the spokesman of the North American Man/Boy Love Association (NAMBLA).

In an interview in The Boston Phoenix in 1996, Andriette said, "I realized I was gay when I was 12". He joined NAMBLA when he was 15 years old, and by the age of 17 he was a member of the Steering Committee. For six years he was the editor of the NAMBLA Bulletin. He expressed differences with some earlier NAMBLA directors' views regarding legalization of what is now considered to be statutory rape, finding room for compromise with government and societal concerns. He expressed frustration that the LGBT rights movement had ostracized NAMBLA, because he regarded the moral condemnation of pedophiles as a "reactionary ideology which the gay movement has happily adopted to burnish its own particular identity category".

During the 1993 International Lesbian and Gay Association (ILGA) controversy, he defended NAMBLA's membership in ILGA, and to a greater extent NAMBLA's place in the gay rights movement, by claiming that "'the main tradition' of homosexuality" is consistent with supporting the abolition of laws prohibiting statutory rape.

He was interviewed by Daniel Tsang on KUCI radio on June 15, 1999.

In 2008, he was a runner up for a Sex Positive Journalism Award (Sexies) for an article which appeared in The Guide: "Tipping-Point for Gay Sex?"

== Selected writings ==
- "Are You a Child Pornographer?". Playboy Magazine (September): 56. 1991.
- Bronski, Michael, ed. (1996). "Dumped Down and Played Out". Taking Liberties: Gay Men's Essays on Politics, Culture, and Sex. Masquerade Books. ISBN 978-1-56333-456-6.
- "The Guide Interviews Camille Paglia". The Guide (January). Fidelity Publishing. 1999. Archived from the original on July 11, 2011.
- "Sex & Empire". The Guide (March). Fidelity Publishing. 2002. Archived from the original on April 16, 2016.
- "Pictures at an Execution". The Guide (October). Fidelity Publishing. 2005. Archived from the original on August 15, 2016.
- "Tipping Point for Gay Sex?". The Guide (December). Fidelity Publishing. 2007. Archived from the original on April 16, 2016.
