= The Age Taboo =

1981 book

The Age Taboo: Gay Male Sexuality, Power and Consent
- Author: Daniel Tsang
- Language: English
- Published: 1981
- Publisher: Alyson Publications
- Publication place: United States
- Pages: 178
- ISBN: 9780907040118

The Age Taboo: Gay Male Sexuality, Power and Consent is a book edited by Daniel Tsang. It contains multiple essays on the topic from gay, feminist and socialist perspectives.
