= Boylove =

Boylove may refer to:

- Boylove, a term used by some pedophile advocacy groups (i.e., the North American Man/Boy Love Association)
- Pederasty, a sexual relationship between a man and a boy
- Boys' love, a genre of fictional media originating in Japan that depicts homoerotic relationships between male characters
