= The Ethics of Sexual Acts =

1929–1944 book series by René Guyon

- Author: René Guyon
- Translator: John Flügel
- Language: French
- Discipline: Philosophy
- Published: 1929-1944
- No. of books: 9

The Ethics of Sexual Acts (Etudes d'éthiques sexueles) is a nine-volume philosophy book series by French jurist and judge René Guyon, published from 1929 to 1944. Described as Guyon's magnum opus by Tamara Loos, the books argue for the broad legalization of all mutual sex acts regardless of the participants' sex, age or other "ethical limitations". The first book was first translated by John Flügel in 1931, and has been introduced by Harry Benjamin and Norman Haire. A tenth volume was drafted by Guyon.

Guyon argues in the books that modern Western sexual ethics are arbitrary and have led to "all sorts of unhealthy, hypocritical pretenses". He wrote that sex-related "present-day morality is responsible for dangerous neuroses, shameful hypocrisies and grave social injustice". He argued against the concept of sexual pervesion, stating that homosexual, masturbatory and incestuous acts "are only differences of procedure, cunningly combined according to individual variations of taste, together with preferences for particular persons or classes of person: and that is all".

Guyon criticized psychiatry and psychoanalysis for having "sided with social convention", and called for "sex and its activities [to] be removed from the sphere of morals, and [...] be judged from the points of view of physiology, psychophysiology or hygiene". He has written that prepubescent children are capable of sexual pleasure and are ready for sexual intercourse.

== List of volumes ==
- The Ethics of Sexual Acts (1929)
- Sexual Freedom (1933)
- Revision of the Classic Institution: Family and Marriage (1934)
- A Rational Sexual Policy: Human Reproduction (1936)
- A Rational Sexual Policy: Sexual Pleasure (1937)
- The Persecution of Sexual Acts: Courtesans (1938)
