= Alice Day (observance) =

Observance

Alice Day is an unofficial observance held on April 25 in some pro-pedophile groups on the internet.

== History ==
The observance was named after Alice Liddell, a then 12-year-old girl who Alice in Wonderland author Lewis Carroll met and debatably fell in love with on April 25, 1856. The date then started to be celebrated by pedophile advocates.

The date has not been considered dangerous by law enforcement agencies and the notion that it is an annual date when people engage in child molestation has been questioned. According to Jesse Bach, a former director of the Imagine Foundation, an organization that develops research and recovery for sex-trafficking victims, Alice Day is a real phenomenon, but instances of child sexual abuse can occur at any date. Alice Day falls in the middle of the child abuse awareness month. According to Snopes, the event was first conceptualized on internet forums, but is not widely celebrated by child molesters every year.

== Opposition ==
In 2013, the hacker collective Anonymous launched several cyberattacks against NAMBLA's website and several CSAM-hosting websites on April 25th, having deliberately chosen the date in protest of the Alice Day observance and pedophilia in general.
