= Tom O'Carroll =

British convicted paedophile advocate (born 1945)

- Born: Thomas Victor O'Carroll; 1945 (age 80–81)
- Other name: TOC
- Education: Lancaster University; Cambridge University; Open University
- Occupations: Teacher; journalist
- Organization: Paedophile Information Exchange
- Known for: Paedophila advocacy
- Notable work: Paedophilia: The Radical Case
- Criminal charges: Conspiring to corrupt public morals (1981), conspiring to distribute indecent photographs of children (2006)

Thomas Victor O'Carroll (born 1945) is a British writer (with dual Irish/British citizenship) and pro-paedophile advocate. O'Carroll is a former chairman of the now disbanded Paedophile Information Exchange (PIE) and was at one time a prominent member of the International Paedophile and Child Emancipation (now known as Ipce).

During the 1970s, O'Carroll lobbied for the legalisation of sexual activities between adults and children, as well as against the criminalisation of child pornography, in the United Kingdom.

He has been imprisoned for conspiring to corrupt public morals (1981) and distribution of child pornography (2006). In 2016, O'Carroll attempted to join the Labour Party but was expelled.

== Early life ==
O'Carroll grew up in Coventry, attending Whitmore Park Primary School and Woodlands school. in 1967 he graduated from Lancaster University with a degree in history. He worked as a teacher at Henry Parkes Primary School and Caludon Castle School in the 1970s. As a postgraduate, O'Carroll studied education at Downing College, Cambridge.

== The Paedophile Information Exchange ==
O'Carroll was working as a press officer for the Open University in the 1970s when he was told of the existence of the Paedophile Information Exchange (PIE) after he came out as a paedophile to lesbian members of the Open University Women's Group. At that time, he was editor of the OU staff newspaper Open House and had been covering a Women's Group meeting on homosexuality. In his book Paedophilia: The Radical Case, O'Carroll wrote: "The general public in the UK has long been aware of 'child-molesting' and 'perversion'. But only in the 1970s did it come to hear about 'paedophilia', a designation suddenly lifted from the obscurity of medical textbooks to become a crusading badge of identity for those whom the term had been designed to oppress".

His activism with PIE cost him his job at the OU, and he was dismissed in February 1978. O'Carroll appealed to an industrial tribunal. The tribunal, in May 1979, rejected his complaint with the reasoning that he had placed himself in such a position through his connection to PIE that he could not do his job effectively.

At the time, O'Carroll was sitting on the sub-committee for gay rights of the National Council for Civil Liberties (NCCL). The Winter 1978 issue of Gay Left magazine reported that the NCCL executive had voted not to distribute a transcript of O'Carroll's speech to the organisation's 1977 conference in which he had objected to the punishment of sex offenders.

Although PIE had campaigned for the age of consent to be lowered to 4 years old, O'Carroll stated that his personal view is that full sexual relations should be allowed at 12 years of age.

== Books ==
=== Paedophilia: The Radical Case ===
O'Carroll's book Paedophilia: The Radical Case was published in 1980. "I am not interested in why I am a paedophile", he writes "any more than others are interested in why they are 'normal'." He advocates the normalisation of adult-child sexual relationships, and details his own illicit experiences.

O'Carroll asserts his belief that each stage of the sexual relationship between an adult and child can be "negotiated", with "hints and signals, verbal and non-verbal, by which each indicates to the other what is acceptable and what is not... the man might start by saying what pretty knickers the girl was wearing, and he would be far more likely to proceed to the next stage of negotiation if she seemed pleased by the remark". Mary-Kay Wilmers in the London Review of Books wrote: "Since Mr O’Carroll sees nothing wrong with paedophilia, he isn’t interested in our sympathy; and since his opinion of the non-paedophile world is no higher than the opinion the non-paedophile world has of him, he doesn’t waste time trying to be conciliatory".

At the time of its release, the book received mainstream reviews which were either scathingly dismissive, like Wilmers, or supportive of the author, if not entirely of the "radical case" he had set out. Sociologist Jeffrey Weeks described the book as "the most sustained advocacy" of "intergenerational sex", and stated that there were two powerful arguments against O'Carroll's views about the possibility of children consenting to sex: the feminist argument that "young people, especially young girls, do need protection from adult men in an exploitative and patriarchal society" and the argument that while adults are fully aware of the sexual connotations of their actions, young people are not, and that there is thus "an inherent and inevitable structural imbalance in awareness of the situation." In 2003, The Guardian described it as "a book justifying the behaviour of those who prey on children."

=== Michael Jackson's Dangerous Liaisons ===
O'Carroll's book on singer Michael Jackson was published in 2010 under the pen name Carl Toms. The book, Michael Jackson's Dangerous Liaisons, concerns the entertainer's alleged intimate relationships with young boys. It was published in the UK by Troubador.

After publication, J. Michael Bailey, professor of psychology at Northwestern University, reviewed the book for the academic journal Archives of Sexual Behavior. Describing the author as "an unapologetic paedophile", Bailey observed that the book takes "a pro-pedophilic stance" and argues "persuasively" that Jackson was "almost certainly paedophilic". Bailey wrote, "The idea that paedophilic relationships can be harmless or even beneficial to children is disturbing to many people, including me." But, he continued, "O’Carroll argues against my intuitions and he argues well."

In 2010, O'Carroll's writing was affected following complaints to Amazon.com about a book by another author, Phillip R. Greaves, which encouraged sexual contact between adults and children. After a campaign by outraged Amazon readers, Amazon dropped the book, along with several other books that appeared to promote paedophilia, including O'Carroll's earlier book, Paedophilia: The Radical Case.

== Convictions ==
=== Conviction in 1981 ===
In 1981, O'Carroll was convicted for conspiracy to corrupt public morals over the contact ads section of the PIE magazine and was imprisoned for two years.

=== Court case in 2002 ===
In August 2002, O'Carroll was convicted at Southwark Crown Court of importing indecent photographs of children from Qatar, which had been found by Customs in October 2001 hidden in his luggage after his arrival at Heathrow Airport. In his packing cases, 94 full-frontal images of naked children aged between 2 and 10 were discovered, apparently taken without their consent or, the judge assumed, without that of their parents. According to O'Carroll, they were equivalent to an art exhibition.

O'Carroll was sentenced to nine-months imprisonment on three counts. The sentence was later overturned in November 2002 by the Court of Appeal which held that the trial judge had been overly influenced by O'Carroll's campaigning. The photos were described in the ruling as having "the quality of indecency in the context in which they were taken, but were of the kind that parents might take of their children entirely innocently". O'Carroll's name was no longer required to be added to the Sex Offenders register.

In 2003, he made an extended appearance on the TV discussion programme After Dark in a BBC revival of the series, featuring, among others, Esther Rantzen and Helena Kennedy.

=== Conviction in 2006 ===
O'Carroll was convicted in 2006 of conspiring to distribute indecent photographs of children after supplying an undercover Metropolitan Police officer with a cache of indecent images of children obtained from his co-defendant Michael Studdert's secret vault containing 50,000 pornographic images. O'Carroll said the images with which he was connected had been in his possession for a "very long time". A new group O'Carroll was involved in running, International Paedophile Child Emancipation Group, and an offshoot, Gentlemen with an Interesting Name, had been infiltrated by an undercover police officer. According to the police, O'Carroll considered the groups as an attempt at creating an "international secret society" of "academic" child abusers.

O'Carroll was arraigned on 1 June 2006 on indecent images of children charges. In September 2006, he admitted to two counts of distributing indecent images of children between 1994 and July 2005. On 20 December 2006, he was jailed for 2½ years at Middlesex Guildhall Crown Court. O'Carroll was placed on the sex offenders register for ten years and would be prevented from working with children in future.

== Expulsion from the Labour Party ==
O'Carroll joined the Labour Party after Jeremy Corbyn became party leader in September 2015. When this became public knowledge on 16 February 2016, via a report in The Times, John Mann, the Labour Member of Parliament for Bassetlaw, and other party figures advocated his immediate expulsion. A Labour Party spokesman told ITV News a few hours later that O'Carroll had been suspended on the basis that he is a "safeguarding risk". The next day, the party confirmed that O'Carroll had been expelled.
