= Peter Hayman (diplomat) =

British diplomat, intelligence agent, and pro-paedophilia activist (1914–1992)

Sir Peter Telford Hayman KCMG CVO MBE (14 June 1914 – 6 April 1992) was a British diplomat, intelligence operative and member of the Paedophile Information Exchange (a pro-paedophile activist group). He was knighted as a Knight Commander of the Order of St Michael and St George in the 1971 New Years Honours List for his work in the diplomatic service. In 1981 he was named in the House of Commons as a paedophile by Geoffrey Dickens MP.

== Early and personal life ==
Hayman was born in Deal, Kent, England, the son of Hilda (Waite-Browne) and Charles Henry Telford Hayman. He was educated at Stowe School and Worcester College, Oxford. He married Rosemary Eardley Blomefield in 1942, and had a son and a daughter.

== Career ==
In November 1937 he joined the Home Office as an Assistant Principal. In World War II he served in the Rifle Brigade from 1942 to 1945, rising to the rank of Major.

Hayman was director general of the British Information Services in New York (1961–64) and then deputy commandant of the British military government in West Berlin from 1964 to 1966. He returned to the Foreign and Commonwealth Office, becoming Deputy Under Secretary of State with responsibility for the United Nations and Eastern Europe from 1969 to 1970. Then, from 1970 to 1974, he served as High Commissioner of the United Kingdom to Canada.

The Independent stated in his obituary that he started a commercial career in 1974, upon retirement at age 60. However, The Guardian reported in 2014 that he later served in the intelligence services, and was "long-time deputy director of MI6". The Daily Telegraph characterised him as an "MI6 operative".

His obituary in The Independent gave his career history as:

- Assistant Principal Home Office 1937–39
- Ministry of Home Security 1939–41
- Assistant Private Secretary to Home Secretary 1941–42
- Principal Home Office 1942, 1945–49
- Personal Assistant to Chief Staff Officer to the Minister MOD 1949–52
- Assistant Secretary MOD 1950
- UK Delegation to NATO 1952–54
- Foreign Office 1954
- Counsellor Belgrade 1955–58
- Assignment to Malta 1958
- Counsellor Baghdad 1959–61
- Director General of British Information Services New York 1961–64
- Minister and Deputy Commandant British Military Government in Berlin 1964–66
- Assistant Undersecretary FO 1966–69
- Deputy Under Secretary of State FCO 1969–70
- High Commissioner in Canada 1970–74

Hayman in 1990 published Soult: Napoleon's Maligned Marshal. In 1979 he reached the semi-finals of the BBC television quiz Mastermind.

== Paedophilia activism ==
In October 1978, Hayman left a package of paedophilia-related material on a London bus. The police traced the package and discovered that Hayman, under the pseudonym "Peter Henderson", had used an apartment in Bayswater, London, to conduct obscene correspondence. In the apartment, police found 45 diaries describing six years of "sexual fantasies" concerning children and activities with prostitutes, articles of female clothing and obscene literature. He was investigated by police but released without charge after being given a warning not to send obscene material through the post.

In November 1980, Private Eye magazine revealed this event. In 1981, using parliamentary privilege, MP Geoffrey Dickens asked why Hayman had not been prosecuted, with Dickens saying: "How did such a potential blackmail risk come to hold highly sensitive posts at the MOD and NATO?" He also asked the Leader of the House of Commons to "investigate the security implications of diaries found in the diplomat's London flat which contained accounts of sexual exploits". In 1981, the Attorney General Sir Michael Havers replied, "I am in agreement with the Director of Public Prosecutions' [Sir Thomas Chalmers Hetherington QC] advice not to prosecute Sir Peter Hayman and the other persons with whom he had carried on an obscene correspondence" adding that, while Hayman had been found to have received pornographic material through the post, it was not of an extreme nature, was non-commercial and in a sealed envelope, so did not warrant prosecution. There was much debate and condemnation in the international press of these events.

Havers said in parliament that, while Hayman was a member of the Paedophile Information Exchange, he was never a member of the executive committee, so was not prosecuted as others were for publishing contact advertisements. In 1984, Hayman was convicted and fined for an act of gross indecency with another adult in a public lavatory. The Prime Minister, Margaret Thatcher, warned Hayman that, should he be known to repeat the offence, he would be stripped of his honours.

On 29 November 1985, Dickens complained in the House of Commons that he had suffered harassment following his naming of Hayman. "The noose around my neck grew tighter after I named a former high-flying British diplomat on the Floor of the House. Honourable Members will understand that where big money is involved and as important names came into my possession so the threats began. First, I received threatening telephone calls followed by two burglaries at my London home. Then, more seriously, my name appeared on a multi-killer's hit list."

On 30 January 2015, it was revealed that a file was found in The National Archives titled "SECURITY. Sir Peter Hayman: allegations against former public official of unnatural sexual proclivities; security aspects". The file is dated from October 1980 to March 1981. One document within the file related to the briefing given to then-Prime Minister Margaret Thatcher concerning Hayman's sexual fantasies related to children. The document also stated that there was no evidence these fantasies had been carried out. A further document outlined the official reaction and response to be made by government ministers if questioned about his 1978 arrest. A different document states that Hayman was vulnerable to blackmail by foreign powers because of his "sexual perversion", but foreign security services were not yet aware.
