= Girllove =

Girllove may refer to:

- Pedophilia, sexual attraction to children
- Yuri (genre), or girls' love, a genre of Japanese media focusing on intimate relationships between female characters
- GirlLove (charity), an American anti-bullying campaign led by Lilly Singh

== See also ==
- Boylove (disambiguation)
