= Thorstad =

Thorstad is a Nordic surname. Notable people with the surname include:

- David Thorstad (1941–2021), American pædophile activist
- Torill Thorstad Hauger (1943–2014), Norwegian non-fiction writer and illustrator
