= Age-of-consent reform =

Effort to change age-of-consent laws

Age-of-consent reform encompasses many different efforts to amend age of consent laws. Age-of-consent refers to the age at which a person can legally consent to sex. Ages-of-consent are enacted to protect those considered too young or immature to have the capacity to consent.

Proposed reforms typically include raising, lowering, or abolishing the age of consent, applying (or not applying) close-in-age exemptions, changing penalties, or changing how cases are examined in court. A related issue is whether or not to enforce ages of consent on homosexual relationships that are different from those enforced on heterosexual relationships. Organized efforts have ranged from academic discussions to political petitions.

== History ==
Gratian, a canon lawyer in the 12th century, stated that females and males could not consent to betrothal before 7 years of age and consent could not take place for marriage before 12 years of age for females and 14 years of age for males. At that time, the age of consent for marriage was about 12 years old for females and about 14 years old for males, in most European countries. Today age of consent for sexual intercourse is usually set between 14 years old and 18 years old.

== Eastern Europe ==
=== Russia ===
Before 1922

Before 1830, the age of consent for marriage was 15 years old for males and 13 years old for females (though 15 years old was preferred for females, so much so that it was written into the Law Code of 1649). Teenage marriage was practised for chastity. Both the female and the male teenager needed consent of their parents to marry because they were under 20 years old, the age of majority. In 1830, the age of consent for marriage was raised to 18 years old for males and 16 years old for females. The average age of marriage for females was around 19 years old.

After 1991

Russia in 1998 lowered the age of consent from 16 to 14, but in 2003, raised the age of consent from 14 back to 16, with close in age exemptions added for those aged 14 and 15.

In 2009, a note was added that exempted from criminal punishment a person who committed sexual intercourse with a 14- or 15-year-old for the first time if he married the victim.

== Western Europe ==
=== United Kingdom ===
In the Statute of Westminster 1275, the English government set the age of consent at 12 years old for females as part of a rape law and section 4 of the Benefit of Clergy Act 1575 (18 Eliz. 1 c. 7) was passed with more severe punishments, for which the age of consent was set at 10 years old for females. Jurist Sir Matthew Hale stated that both rape laws were valid at the same time.

Age of consent for marriage (sexual intercourse) was set at 12 years old for maidens (girls) and 14 years old for youths (boys), under English common law. Age of majority was set at 21 years old, adolescent males and adolescent females needed parental consent to marry.

The Offences against the Person Act 1875 raised it to 13 in Great Britain and Ireland. The Criminal Law Amendment Act 1885 raised it to 16. In 1917, a bill raising the age of consent in Great Britain and Ireland from 16 to 17 was defeated by only one vote. In Northern Ireland in 1950, the legislature of Northern Ireland passed a law called Children and Young Persons Act (Northern Ireland) 1950 that raised the age of consent from 16 to 17. The age of consent in Northern Ireland was later lowered back to 16, by the Sexual Offences (Northern Ireland) Order 2008.

In 1929, age of consent for marriage (sexual intercourse) was raised to 16 years old for both, females and males. In 1970, the age of majority was lowered from 21 years old to 18 years old, making it legal for males and females 18 years old and older to marry without parental consent.

=== France ===
In 1977 while a reform in the French penal code was under discussion in the parliament, a petition to decriminalize all consensual relations between adults and children/teenagers below the age of fifteen was sent to Parliament but did not succeed in changing the law. In 1978, the petition was discussed in a broadcast by radio France Culture in the program "Dialogues", with the transcript later published under the title Sexual Morality and the Law in a book by Michel Foucault, later published again under the title The Danger of Child Sexuality. The participants, including Foucault, play-writer/actor Jean Danet, novelist/gay activist Guy Hocquenghem and feminist Simone de Beauvoir had all signed the petition.

=== Netherlands ===
Between 1990 and 2002, the Netherlands operated what was in effect an age of consent of 12, subject to qualifications. The relevant law, passed in November 1990, permitted sexual intercourse for young people between 12 and 16, but allowed a challenge by parents based on erosion of parental authority or child exploitation, which would be heard by a Council for the Protection of Children. In 1979, the Dutch Pacifist Socialist Party supported an unsuccessful petition to lower the age of consent to 12.

=== Norway ===
In 2023, Norway proposed to lower the age of consent from 16 to 15. However, it was abandoned following its criticism by the Church of Norway.

== Africa ==
=== Kenya ===
In Kenya, it was debated to lower the age of consent from 18 to 16, within the Sexual Offences Act 2006.

== North America ==
=== Canada ===
In June 2006, the Canadian government proposed a bill to raise the age of consent from 14 to 16 (in 1890, it was raised from 12 to 14), while creating a near-age exemption for sex between 14- and 15-year-olds and partners less than 5 years older, and keeping an existing near-age clause for sex between 12 and 13 year olds and partners less than 2 years older. The initiative also maintains a temporary exception for already existing marriages of minors 14 and 15 years old to adults, but forbids new marriages like these in the future. The law took effect May 1, 2008.

=== United States ===
18th century

The age of consent in question has to do with the law of rape and not the law of marriage (sexual intercourse) as sometimes misunderstood. Under English common law the age of consent, a part of the law of rape, was 10 or 12 years old and rape was defined as forceful sexual intercourse with a woman against her will. To convict a man of rape, both force and lack of consent had to be proved, except in the case of a girl who is under the age of consent. English common law existed in the British colonies of America and was adopted by Delaware and other states in 1776.

19th and 20th centuries

In Delaware, the age of consent was 10 years old until 1871 when it was lowered to 7 years old. Under the 1871 law, a man was given the death penalty for sex with a girl below the age of consent.

By 1880, 37 states had an age of consent of 10 years, 10 states had an age of consent at 12 years, and Delaware maintained an age of consent of 7 years.

In the late 19th century, a "social purity movement" composed of Christian feminist reform groups began to advocate raising the age of consent to 16, with the goal of raising it ultimately to 18 or 21. By 1920, 26 states had an age of consent at 16, 21 states had an age of consent at 18, and one state (Georgia) had an age of consent at 14.

Alaska was bought from the Russians in 1867 and became the 49th state of the U.S. in 1959. Its age of consent was 16 years old.

Hawaii was a constitutional monarchy until 1893, and was thereafter a U.S. Territory; it became the 50th U.S. state in 1959. Its age of consent was 14 years old.

Georgia and Hawaii both raised their age of consent from 14 to 16, in 1995 and 2001 respectively. Colorado lowered its age of consent from 18 to 15 because the age of majority there was lowered from 21 years old to 18 in 1970.

Present

As of October 16, 2020, the age of consent in each state in the United States is either 16, 17, or 18 years of age.

==== Alabama ====
In 2012, Alabama State Representative Mac McCutcheon sponsored a bill to raise the age of consent from 16 to 18. As of February 2023, the age of consent in Alabama remains 16.

==== Hawaii ====
In 2001, the legislature in Hawaii voted to raise the age of consent from 14 to 16.

==== Georgia ====
In June 2005, a bill was proposed before the General Assembly of Georgia (USA) to raise the age of consent from 16 to 18. The bill failed, however.

Georgia was the most resistant state to raising its age of consent in the early 1900s. Georgia's age of consent was 10 years old until 1918, at which time the age of consent was raised to 14. After raising the age of consent in 1918, Georgia was the only state in the United States to have an age of consent lower than 16. Georgia's age of consent remained at 14 until 1995, when a bill proposed by senator Steve Langford to make the age of consent 16 passed.

In 2006, following the case of Genarlow Wilson (Wilson v. State), aggravated child molestation was reduced to a misdemeanor with a maximum of one year in prison if the offender was under 19, the victim was either 14 or 15 years old, and the offender is no more than 48 months older than the victim. (Georgia penal code, 16-6-4). Previously, aggravated child molestation (at any age) carried 5–20 years imprisonment regardless of the age difference between the victim and offender.

==== Kentucky ====
Under Kentucky law, a person who is sixteen years of age or older may consent to a sexual act with a person not more than ten years older than the minor, but otherwise below the age of eighteen is presumed to be incapable of consent to a sexual act. However, where a person is in a position of authority over the minor such as a teacher, coach or relative, whatever the age difference, a minor below the age of eighteen is deemed incapable of consent.

==== Missouri ====
In 2008, a bill was introduced in the Missouri legislature to raise the age of consent from 17 to 18. The bill was sponsored by Representative Stanley Cox. The bill did not become law.

==== South Carolina ====
In South Carolina in 2007, a bill was proposed before the legislature to raise the age of consent from 16 to 18. It did not succeed.

==== Wisconsin ====
Prior to 1981, Wisconsin had an exception to the law that allowed adults who were guilty of sex with minors 15 or older to use as a defense that the victim understood the nature of the sexual act, but there was a rebuttable presumption in Wisconsin that minors under the age of 18 were not capable of informed consent to sex; but, as stated, this could be argued against by the defendant in the court of law if the minor was 15 years of age or older. In 1981, the age of consent was lowered from 18 to 16 in Wisconsin; but, at the same time, it was made an automatic felony to have sex with anyone under 16. Informed consent for a 15-year-old was no longer a defense an adult defendant could use in court. In 1983, the age of consent in Wisconsin was raised from 16 to 18; under the new law, sex with a minor 16 or older carried the lesser penalty of a Class A misdemeanor. A marital exemption was included in the law for an adult who was married to a minor 16 or older, but no close-in-age exception was included.

==== Oklahoma ====
In 2025, the Oklahoma legislature enacted HB 1003, a bill to raise the age of consent from 16 to 18.

== South America ==
=== Peru ===
The age of consent in Peru was increased from 14 to 18 in 2006 as elections approached, but in 2007, Peru's new Congress voted to return the age to 14 regardless of gender and/or sexual orientation. However, after strong public opposition, the law was raised back to 18 on June 27, 2007, by a vote of 74 to zero (22 abstentions). It was returned to 14 in December 2012.

== Asia ==
=== India ===
Until 2012, the age of consent in India had been set at 16, under Section 375 of the IPC (Indian Penal Code), which stated that, consent is irrelevant […] ‘Sixthly. With or without her consent, when she is under sixteen years of age.’

In November 2012, the POCSO Act came into force, which set a new threshold, at 18.

Following this, there has been numerous debate on returning the age of consent to 16.

Arguments having come from both politicians, high courts, and members of the general public.

=== Iraq ===
Attempts were made by the Iraqi parliament to lower the age of consent in Iraq to 9 in 2024.

However, a revised bill was passed in January 2025 which reinstated the clauses of the previous amendment keeping the age of consent at 15 following protests in Iraq along with backlash from both international and local civil society groups, retaining the former age of consent.

=== Japan ===
The age of consent in Japan was raised from 13 to 16 in 2023, when Articles 176 and 177 of the Penal Code were revised in a major overhaul of the country's sexual offence laws.

== Male homosexuality ==
United Kingdom

The male homosexual age of consent in the United Kingdom was set at 21 in the Sexual Offences Act of 1967, lowered to 18 in the Criminal Justice and Public Order Act 1994, and then finally lowered equally to 16 in England and Wales and Scotland in the Sexual Offences (Amendment) Act of 2000. In 1970, the age of majority was lowered from 21 years old to 18 years old.

United States

Philip Jenkins said in the mid-1970s, there was widespread sympathy among homosexual activist groups for lowering the age of consent for all sexual activities with many gay publications discussing lowering it for boys. These tensions and antagonisms continued among activist circles until the 1980s; however, since the 1970s, gay liberationist groups promoting frontline advocacy against the age of consent were falling into decline. In 1971, the age of majority was lowered from 21 years old to 18 years old, except in Mississippi (21), Alabama (19), and Nebraska (19).

== Close-in-age exemptions ==
In the United States, many states have adopted close-in-age exemptions. These laws, known as "Romeo and Juliet laws", provide that a person can legally have consensual sex with a minor provided that they are not more than a given number of years older, generally four years or less. Some Romeo and Juliet laws (such as the law in Michigan) do not make it legal for a person below the age of consent to have sex with a slightly older person, but may exempt the older partner from sex offender registration.

Romeo and Juliet laws were passed in 2007 in Connecticut and Indiana. In Indiana, a change in the law decriminalizes consensual sex between adolescents if they are found by a court to be in a "dating relationship" with an age difference of four years or less and other states have adopted similar reforms. Michigan passed a Romeo and Juliet Law in 2011.

These reforms have been controversial. In Texas, Governor Rick Perry vetoed Romeo and Juliet laws that had been passed by the legislature in 2009, but signed one in 2011 to go into effect in September of that year. A 2011 Romeo and Juliet bill failed to pass in the Illinois legislature. In the State v. Limon case, Kansas's Romeo and Juliet law was found to be unconstitutional because it excluded same-sex sexual conduct.

Some countries other than the United States also have Romeo and Juliet laws. Ireland's 2006 law has been contested because it treats girls differently from boys.

== Advocacy for pedophilia ==
Some pedophiles and their sympathizers have called to abolish the age of consent to allow children and adults to have sexual relationships. Past groups advocating for this include NAMBLA in the United States, the Paedophile Information Exchange in the UK and Vereniging Martijn in the Netherlands.

== See also ==
- Half your age plus seven
- Sex education
- Sexual consent in law
- Comprehensive sex education
