= Paedophile Information Exchange =

British pro-paedophilia activist group

Paedophile Information Exchange (PIE)
- PIE logo 1974–1984
- Formation: 1974
- Dissolved: 1984
- Type: Disbanded
- Purpose: Pro-paedophilia advocacy; Age-of-consent reform
- Headquarters: London
- Location: United Kingdom
- Key people: Ian Dunn; Tom O'Carroll

The Paedophile Information Exchange (PIE) was a British pro-paedophilia activist group, founded in October 1974 and officially disbanded in 1984. The group campaigned for the abolition of the age of consent. It was described by the BBC in 2007 as "an international organisation of people who trade obscene material".

Although it had a few women paedophiles as members, the organisation's membership was mainly young, professionally educated male paedophiles, including youth and care workers. Its membership in 1977 was around 250, mainly in London and the South East; the same number for membership was also reported in 1981.

== Early history and activity ==
PIE was set up as a special interest group within the Scottish Minorities Group by founding member Michael Hanson, a student living in Edinburgh, who became the group's first chairman, and co-founder Ian Dunn, who was also the founder of the Scottish Minorities Group. Although Hanson did not identify as a paedophile, his sexual relationship with a 15-year-old, and the disparate age of consent laws for heterosexual and homosexual activity made Hanson sympathise with paedophile advocacy. (Note: Whilst the age of consent for heterosexual intercourse in the UK has remained constant, the age of consent for homosexuals was still 21 years old at the time of PIE's founding. This was reduced to 18 in 1994 and 16 in 2001 – the same age of consent as heterosexual activity. (See Age of consent in Europe.))

Since the majority of enquiries were from England, in 1975 PIE relocated to London, where 23-year-old Keith Hose became chairman. The group's stated aim was "to alleviate [the] suffering of many adults and children" by campaigning to abolish the age of consent thus legalising sex between adults and children. During the early days of its activism, Tom O'Carroll stated that only a small group of people were "in the know" about groups such as PIE, namely "readers of gay newspapers and magazines, and others in gay circles who had heard by word of mouth".

The Paedophile Action for Liberation had developed as a breakaway group from South London Gay Liberation Front. PAL had its own magazine, Palaver, which published material sympathetic to paedophiles. One edition of this magazine carried an article saying that "If all paedophiles in community schools or private schools were to strike, how many would be forced to close, or at least alter their regimes?" However, PAL was later the subject of an article in the Sunday People, which dedicated its front page and centre-spread to the story, headlined "The vilest men in Britain". The result was intimidation of, and loss of employment for, some of those who were exposed. It later merged with PIE.

This exposé on PAL had an effect on PIE members' willingness for activism. In the PIE Chairperson's Annual Report for 1975–1976, Hose wrote that "The only way for PIE to survive, was to seek out as much publicity for the organization as possible. ... If we got bad publicity we would not run into a corner but stand and fight. We felt that the only way to get more paedophiles joining PIE ... was to seek out and try to get all kinds of publications to print our organization's name and address and to make paedophilia a real public issue."

A campaign to attract media attention was not effective, but Hose's attendance at the 1975 annual conference of the Campaign for Homosexual Equality (CHE) in Sheffield, at which he made a speech on paedophilia, was covered at length in The Guardian. Peter Hain, then Honorary Vice-President of CHE, condemned PIE: "Some plain speaking is called for: paedophilia is not a condition to be given a nod and a wink as a healthy fringe activity in society – it is a wholly undesirable abnormality requiring sensitive treatment." During Hain's time as president of the Young Liberals and following his description of paedophilia as "a wholly undesirable abnormality", a fellow Liberal activist said, "It is sad that Peter has joined the hang 'em and flog 'em brigade. His views are not the views of most Young Liberals." A motion at CHE's 1977 annual conference condemning "the harassment of the Paedophile Information Exchange by the press" was passed.

In the same year, Hose also attended a conference organised by Mind, the national mental health organisation, where it was suggested that PIE should submit evidence to the Home Office's Criminal Law Revision Committee on the age of consent. PIE submitted a 17-page document in which it proposed that there should be no age of consent, and that the criminal law should concern itself only with sexual activities to which consent is not given, or which continue after prohibition by a civil court.

PIE was set up to campaign for an acceptance and understanding of paedophilia by producing controversial documents. But its formally defined aims also included giving advice and counsel to paedophiles who wanted it, and providing a means for paedophiles to contact one another.

To this end, it held regular meetings in London; however, it also had a "Contact Page" in Magpie, which was a bulletin in which members placed advertisements, giving their membership number, general location, and brief details of their sexual and other interests. Replies were handled by PIE, as with a box number system, so that correspondents were unidentifiable until they chose to exchange their own details. Since the purpose of this contact page was to enable paedophiles to contact one another, advertisements implying that contact with children was sought and advertisements for erotica were turned down. Extracts from these contact pages were republished by the News of the World. In the absence of any proof of child sexual abuse, these contact advertisements in Magpie were considered part of a "conspiracy to corrupt public morals". According to the Daily Mail, Lord Justice Fulford – then a campaigner for the NCCL (National Council for Civil Liberties) – was a founder member of "Conspiracy Against Public Morals", a group set up to defend Pie members facing criminal charges. While saying he has "no memory" of ever being a part of the organisation, Fulford said that he "attended a few meetings of the NCCL's gay rights committee ... [where] I provided some legal advice in the context of general civil liberties objections to the wide-ranging charge of conspiracy to corrupt public morals", adding that he has "always been deeply opposed to paedophilia" and pro-paedophile activists who wished to lower the age of consent below 16.

PIE used the offices of Release (1 Elgin Evenue, London W9) as a holding address; this was ended when Christian Wolmar joined Release's staff in 1976.

PIE produced regular magazines that were distributed to members. The original Newsletter was superseded in 1976 by Understanding Paedophilia, which was intended to be sold in radical bookshops and be distributed free to PIE members. It was mainly the concern of Warren Middleton, who attempted to make the magazine a serious journal that included extracts from sensitive paedophilic literature and articles from psychologists, with the aim of establishing respectability for paedophilia.

In 1976, both PIE and PAL had been asked to help the Albany Trust, which received financial support from the government, to produce a booklet on paedophilia which was to have been published by the Trust. Mary Whitehouse referred to this collaboration in a speech, asserting that public funds were being used to subsidise paedophile groups. PIE itself did not receive public funding. The Albany Trustees decided in 1977 not to continue with the project. A year later, a question relating to the incident was asked in the House of Commons by Sir Bernard Braine but, despite a statement by Home Office Minister Brynmor John that there was no evidence of public money going to PIE, the issue was drawn out into 1978 in the letters pages of The Guardian and The Times.

When Middleton ceased active work with PIE, Understanding Paedophilia was replaced by the magazine Magpie, which was more of a compromise between the proselytising of the earlier publication and a forum for members. It contained news, book and film reviews, articles, non-nude photographs of children, humour about paedophilia, letters and other contributions by members.

In 1977, PIE produced another regular publication called Childhood Rights. When the editor ('David') retired, this content was assimilated into Magpie. The Conservative member of parliament, Cyril Townsend, during the second reading of his Protection of Children private members' bill in February 1978, reported that PIE claimed to have 250 members.

In 1978 and 1979, the Paedophile Information Exchange surveyed its members and found that they were most attracted to girls aged 8–11 and boys aged 11–15. In 1978, Glenn Wilson and David Cox approached O'Carroll with a request to study the PIE membership. A meeting was held with the PIE leadership to vet the survey instruments and, after approval, these were distributed to PIE members in the course of their regular mailing. Wilson and Cox went on to use the data in writing their book, The Child-Lovers – a study of paedophiles in society.

== Public protests and reactions ==
Once the guests of the hotel where a PIE public meeting was to be held learnt about the event, they cancelled $2,500 worth of hotel room reservations and physically threatened the manager, who was also faced with a walkout by the angry staff. The PIE members were also subsequently pelted with rotten fruit and vegetables by "angry mothers" and required protection from the police. The far-right British National Front also protested in front of PIE's conferences in the 1970s.

In March 2014, a whistleblower told police he witnessed a successful three-year grant renewal application to the Home Office for £35,000 in 1980, implying that a similar grant had been made in 1977. A review conducted later that year found no evidence that the group had received funding from the Home Office, even if they had given cash to organisations with connections to PIE.

== Legal action against members ==
In the summer of 1978, the homes of several PIE committee members were raided by the police as part of a full-scale inquiry into PIE's activities; as a result of this inquiry, a substantial report was submitted to the Director of Public Prosecutions, and the prosecution of PIE activists followed.

In particular, five activists were charged with printing contact advertisements in Magpie which were calculated to promote indecent acts between adults and children.

Others were offered lesser charges of sending indecent material through the mail if they testified against the five. These charges related to letters that the accused had exchanged detailing various sexual fantasies. It eventually became clear that one person had corresponded with most of the accused but had not been tried. After the trial, it emerged that there had been a cover-up: Mr "Henderson" had worked for MI6 and had been a High Commissioner in Canada. Mr "Henderson" was revealed in November 1980, in the magazine Private Eye, to be Sir Peter Hayman.

In 1981, Geoffrey Dickens, MP, asked the Attorney-General "if he will prosecute Sir Peter Hayman under the Post Office Acts for sending and receiving pornographic material through the Royal Mail", questioning how "such a potential blackmail risk come to hold highly sensitive posts at the MOD and NATO?" He also asked the Leader of the House of Commons to "investigate the security implications of diaries found in the diplomat's London flat which contained accounts of sexual exploits". The Attorney-General, Sir Michael Havers, replied, "I am in agreement with the Director of Public Prosecutions' (Sir Thomas Chalmers Hetherington, QC) advice not to prosecute Sir Peter Hayman and the other persons with whom he had carried on an obscene correspondence," adding that, while Hayman had been found to have received pornographic material through the post, it was not of an extreme nature, was non-commercial and in a sealed envelope, so did not warrant prosecution. There was much debate and condemnation in the international press of these events.

Steven Adrian Smith was Chairperson of PIE from 1979 to 1985. He was one of the PIE executive committee members charged in connection with the contact advertisements; he fled to Holland before the trial.

In 1981, the former PIE Chair Tom O'Carroll was convicted on the conspiracy charge and sentenced to two years in prison. O'Carroll had been working on Paedophilia: The Radical Case in the period between the initial police raid and the trial. While the charges did not relate in any way to the publication of the book, the fact that he had written it was listed by the judge as a factor in determining the length of his sentence.

In 1984, The Times reported that two former executive committee members of PIE had been convicted on child pornography charges but acquitted on charges of incitement to commit unlawful sexual acts with children, and that the group's leader had fled the country while on bail. It was announced that the group was closing down in the PIE Bulletin as of July 1984.

One-time treasurer of PIE, Charles Napier, became an English Language Trainer at the British Council and was convicted of sexual assault against minors in London in 1995 and investigated as an alleged member of a paedophile network operating in British schools in 1996. He set up his own school in Turkey and resumed English Language Training with the British Council after serving his sentence. Napier was accused in 2005 by journalist Francis Wheen of having sexually assaulted boys while a gym master at Copthorne Preparatory School in West Sussex. Wheen gave evidence at Napier's 2014 trial, waiving his right to anonymity. Napier was convicted in December 2014 and jailed for 13 years for child sexual abuse.

In January 2006, the Metropolitan Police Service Paedophile Unit arrested the remaining PIE members on child pornography charges. One of those arrested, David Joy, was warned by his sentencing judge that his beliefs may preclude his ever being released from jail.

Douglas Slade, who was involved in both the Paedophile Action for Liberation and PIE, was convicted at Bristol Crown Court in June 2016, and sentenced to 24 years' imprisonment. He was found guilty of multiple counts of indecent assault and other sexual offences against victims aged between 10 and 16 committed between 1965 and 1980. It was said during his trial that Slade had run what was effectively a helpline to aid the practices of child sex abusers from his parents' Bristol home in the 1960s and 1970s.

== Affiliation to the NCCL ==
Whilst PIE was affiliated with it, the National Council for Civil Liberties (now Liberty) argued that photographs of undressed children should not be considered "indecent" – and therefore illegal – unless it could be proven that the subject had suffered harm, or an inference to that effect could reasonably be drawn from the images. A document penned on the organisation's behalf by Harriet Harman (later deputy leader of the Labour Party), working as a legal officer at the time, placed the onus of proving harm on prosecutors and warned of the dangers of increasing censorship, although it did also argue that "it is none-the-less justifiable to restrain activities by photographer[s] which involve placing children under the age of 14 (or, arguably, 16) in sexual situations". The issue of PIE's connection to the NCCL was controversial internally, with union affiliates lukewarm. At the spring 1977 NCCL conference, then general secretary Patricia Hewitt said that "public hostility to paedophilia was such that it damaged the cause of gay rights for the gay movement to be associated with it".

In May 1978, according to Magpie, NCCL motions were passed supporting PIE's rights and the annual meeting went on to condemn 'attacks' against paedophiles and their supporters, saying "this AGM condemns the physical and other attacks on those who have discussed or attempted to discuss paedophilia, and reaffirms the NCCL's condemnation of harassment and unlawful attacks on such persons." A spokesperson for Harman said: "PIE had been excluded from the NCCL before she became legal officer." However, press cuttings from 1983 make it clear that it was still considered an "affiliate group", according to The Daily Telegraph. In August 1983, a Scotland Yard report on the activities of PIE was being sent to the Director of Public Prosecutions, following the 1981 arrest of Tom O'Carroll.

In February 2014, Shami Chakrabarti, the director of Liberty, issued an apology for the previous links between the NCCL, as Liberty was then known, and PIE. She said: "It is a source of continuing disgust and horror that even the NCCL had to expel paedophiles from its ranks in 1983 after infiltration at some point in the seventies."

== Allegations against senior politicians ==
A number of senior Labour Party politicians were linked in newspaper stories to PIE in December 2013, and again in February 2014, as a result of their involvement with the NCCL at the time of PIE's affiliation. The party's deputy leader, Harriet Harman, had been employed by NCCL as an in-house solicitor and met her husband, the MP Jack Dromey, then a member of NCCL's executive committee, while working in this capacity. In addition, Patricia Hewitt was NCCL's general secretary for nine years. The former chair of PIE, Tom O'Carroll, claimed the three had not attempted to expel PIE out of fear for the impact this might have on their careers at the NCCL.

Harman denied she had supported PIE while at NCCL and the specific allegation that she supported a campaign for the age of consent to be reduced to 10, and expressed regret at the involvement of the NCCL with PIE. Dromey also denied the accusations. Hewitt apologised separately, saying she had been "naive and wrong to accept that PIE was a counseling and campaign group".

In June 2015, documents emerged as a result of a BBC freedom of information request that revealed the then Conservative Home Secretary, Leon Brittan, refused to support a bill designed to outlaw PIE because he considered the law on incitement of sexual activities with children to be "not so clear".

On 19 July 2015, Australia's 60 Minutes broadcast an investigation of an alleged paedophile ring, into which abused children were allegedly supplied by Peter Righton, who was also a former director of education in the National Institute for Social Work. The alleged network was said to include senior public figures such as Greville Janner and Cyril Smith, alongside a former head of MI6, Peter Hayman.

== Groups supporting PIE ==
During its existence several groups and publications supported PIE, including:

- Albany Trust
- Campaign for Homosexual Equality
- Gay Left
- National Council for Civil Liberties, now Liberty
- Spartacus International Gay Guide

== 1970s membership list handed to BBC in 2024 ==
The Obscene Publications Unit of the Metropolitan Police (nicknamed "The Dirty Squad") had a secret list of 316 PIE members, mostly men and most in the UK but with some in western Europe, Australia and the US, possibly seized in a police raid in the late 1970s. The list was given to the BBC, which investigated further, in 2024, by a former social worker who had himself received it from a former police officer in 1998. The social worker had over 30 years unsuccessfully pushed police, a Labour MP and a Conservative government minister to look at PIE members linked to social services and special schools.

The BBC found further information on about 45% of the people on the list: half had later been convicted, cautioned, or charged for sexual offences against children included distributing abuse images, kidnap and rape. About 70 on the list had later been in work likely to bring them into contact with minors. Half of the 70 had been teachers; others included social workers, sports coaches, youth workers, doctors, clergy, lay preachers and military officers involved in youth activities. A small number of men on the list were found to possibly still be in contact with children professionally in 2024, with no criminal convictions the BBC could find.

== See also ==
- North American Man/Boy Love Association
- Vereniging Martijn
- Party for Neighbourly Love, Freedom and Diversity
- Pedophile Group

== Notes and references ==
=== References ===
- O'Carroll, Tom (1980). Paedophilia: The Radical Case (hardback ed.). London: Peter Owen Ltd.
- The Times, 17 November 1984, p. 4: "PIE member faces child pornography charge"
- The Times, 15 November 1984, p. 3: "Leaders of paedophile group are sent to jail"
- Wilson, G. and Cox, D. The Child-Lovers – a study of paedophiles in society. London. Peter Owen (1983). ISBN 0-7206-0603-9
