= Imagine Foundation =

The Imagine Foundation is an American anti-human trafficking nonprofit organization based in Cleveland and founded by Jesse Bach. The organization has published multiple reports about sex-trafficking in the state of Ohio.

== History and activities ==
The Imagine Foundation was founded by Jesse Bach, who serves as its executive director. The organization has created a training program called Care Cleveland, which teaches hospitality workers to treat victims of forced labor and prostitution. It has also conducted investigations in several cities in Iowa. In 2014, organization found 2.965 advertisements for commercial sex within Ohio between June 1 and August 31 on a website of classified advertisements.

== See also ==
- Alice Day
