= Albany Trust =

British charity that supports LGBT people

The Albany Trust is a British organisation which describes itself as a "specialist counselling and psychotherapy charity, focusing on a positive approach to sexuality and relationships". It was founded as a registered charity in May 1958 to complement the Homosexual Law Reform Society (HLRS).

== Current work ==
The original goal of the Trust was to "promote psychological health in men by collecting data and conducting research: to publish the results thereof by writing, films, lectures and other media: to take suitable steps based thereon for the public benefit to improve the social and general conditions necessary for such healthy psychological development."

The Albany Trust has since developed into a pioneering counselling and psychotherapy organisation, offering low-cost accessible long-term counselling and psychotherapy, with a focus on LGBTQI+ people and sexual minorities.

== History ==
It takes its name from the Albany, in Piccadilly, London, where J.B. Priestley and his wife Jacquetta Hawkes had an apartment, and at which the trust's earliest meetings were held. The founding Trustees were A.E. Dyson, Jacquetta Hawkes, Kenneth Walker, Andrew Hallidie Smith, and Ambrose Appelbe

The funds raised and donated for the work of the Albany Trust allowed it to open offices in October 1958. These facilities, at 32 Shaftesbury Avenue, were then also available for the campaigning work of the HLRS. The longtime "public face" of these activities was Antony Grey, from 1962 Secretary of both the Albany Trust and the HLRS (the latter later being renamed the Sexual Law Reform Society).

After the Sexual Offences Act 1967 partially decriminalised homosexual relationships between adult men, the Albany Trust became an educational and counselling organisation. From 1967 the Trust was also involved the development of sex education. For example, this included support and advice for the Dorian Society of New Zealand.

The Albany Trust, with help from the Paedophile Information Exchange and the Paedophile Action for Liberation, published a booklet on paedophilia. The book was controversial, and campaigners such as Mary Whitehouse claimed that this showed that public funds were being used to subsidise pro-paedophile groups; however, PIE and PAL did not receive public funding directly.

== See also ==
- List of LGBT medical organisations
- London Friend
