= Pedophile advocacy groups =

Groups that advocate for child-adult sex

"Minor Attracted Persons" flag used by some supporters of pedophilia

Pedophile advocacy groups (alternatively spelled paedophile advocacy groups in Commonwealth English) have existed dating back to 1962 in multiple countries including the United States, the United Kingdom, France, Norway, Germany and the Netherlands.

Many pro-pedophile organizations advocate in favor of the abolition of age of consent laws, as well as other regulations related to sexuality and children. In the 20th century, a number of pro-pedophile groups were founded during the Sexual Revolution. In the United States, pro-pedophile groups such as the René Guyon Society have existed since the 1960s. In Britain, the Paedophile Information Exchange (PIE), led by Tom O'Carroll, has operated from 1974 to 1984 and openly collaborated with other political organizations such as the Albany Trust and the NCCL (National Council for Civil Liberties). In France, many intellectuals signed petitions against age of consent laws during the 1970s, as part of wider debates around age of consent reform at the time. The Netherlands was once seen as one of the main centers of pedophile activism.

== History ==
=== 20th century ===
==== United States ====
In the United States, pro-pedophile groups have often been inspired by their European counterparts, with some being transitory in nature and emerging in wake of criminal cases, and others being more long-lived. Some of these organizations have been investigated by law-enforcement agencies, with seizures of evidence, arrests and incarcerations of their leaders taking place. Some members of these groups have used pseudonyms to hide their identities.

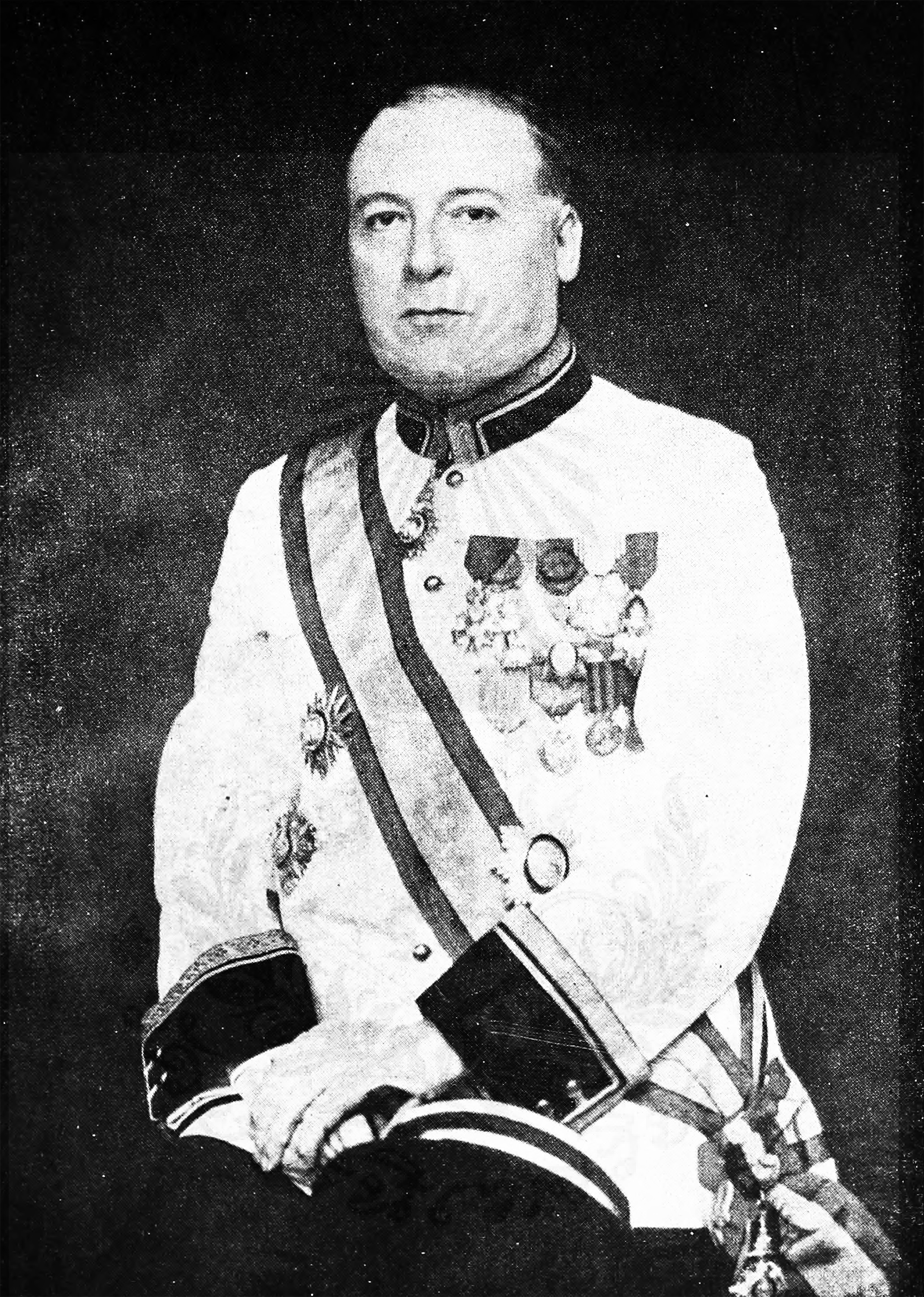
Guyon in 1963

The René Guyon Society was the first pro-pedophile organization to be founded in the United States. The group was established in 1962 by seven people who had attended a conference by French jurist and pro-adult-child sex advocate René Guyon (1876–1963). During a 1977 subcommittee on select education, the organization's leader said that the group had 5,000 members nationwide. In 1971, the California-based Childhood Sensuality Circle was founded with the intent of advocating for sexual activities between adults and children. In 1978, the North American Man/Boy Love Association (NAMBLA) was founded following a police operation in Massachusetts.

==== Europe ====
===== United Kingdom =====
The Paedophile Action for Liberation (PAL) was the first pedophile advocacy group founded in Britain. Moreover, the British Pedophile Information Exchange (PIE) was established in 1974 and openly collaborated with political organizations such as the Albany Trust and the National Council for Civil Liberties (NCCL). PIE was affiliated with the NCCL from late 1970s to the early 1980s.

From August to September 1977, news articles were published on the daily denouncing PIE and its leader Tom O'Carroll. The organization remained notorious in the British press until the 1980s. In 1984, PIE was dissolved after its leaders were prosecuted for conspiracy to corrupt public morals.

===== Netherlands =====
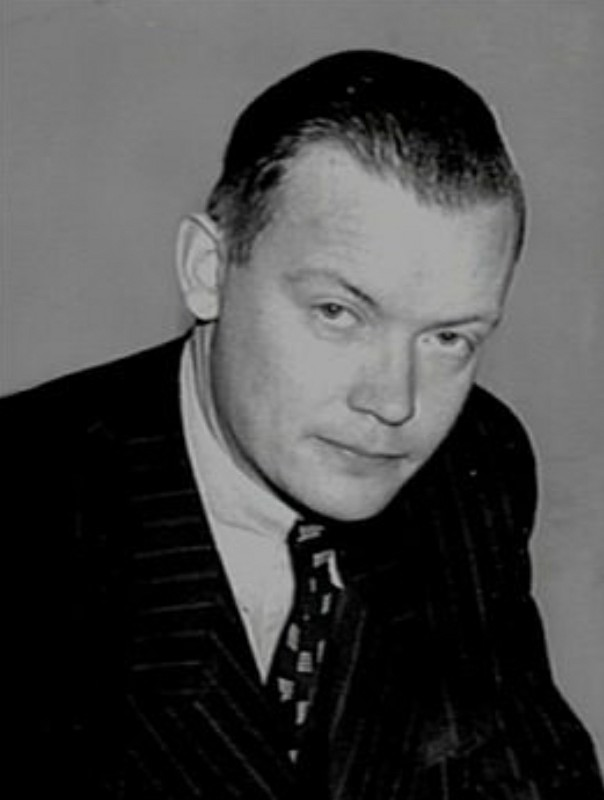
PvdA Senator Brongersma in 1948

The Netherlands was once seen as one of the main centers of the pedophile movement. In 1971, the country had seen a federated network of pro-pedophile groups working in the Dutch Society for Sexual Reform. During the 1960s, Frits Bernard and Dutch Labour Party senator Edward Brongersma founded a pro-pedophile group.

In 1982, Vereniging Martijn was founded and further sought to participate in political discussions on the topic of pedophilia. In 2006, its members founded a political party called the Party for Neighbourly Love, Freedom, and Diversity, which was later dissolved.

===== Germany =====
In Germany, the German Study and Working Group on Pedophilia (DSAP) was highly active in the 1980s and had psychologist Helmut Kentler serving on its board in 1980. The DSAP also shared a post office box with the Humanist Union, an organization that also had ties with advocates of adult-child sexual relations, in Düsseldorf.

===== France =====
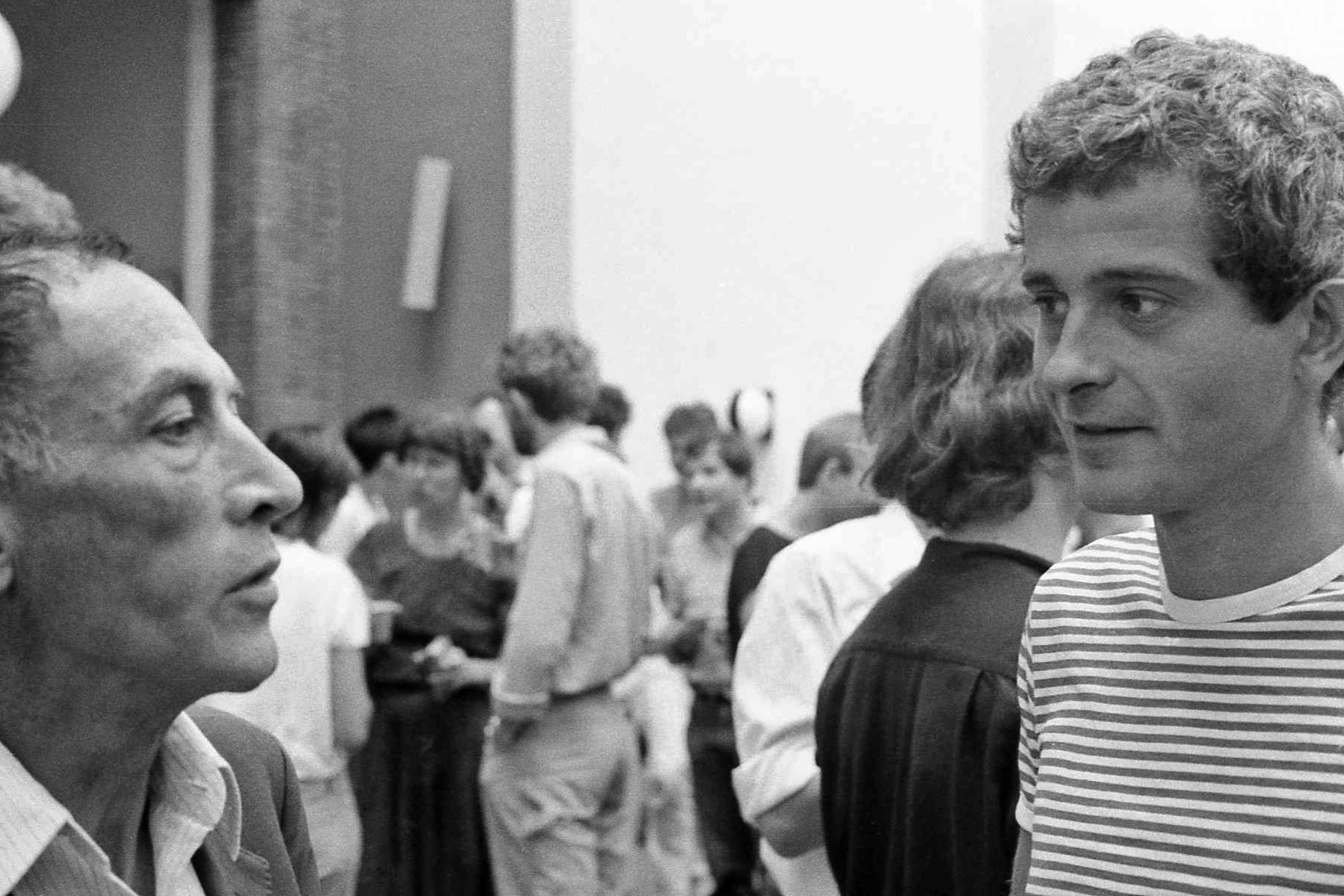
Scherer (left) and Hocquenghem (right) in 1983

In 1977, many French intellectuals including René Scherer, his former pupil and lover Guy Hocquenghem and Gabriel Matzneff signed petitions against age of consent laws, which garnered the support of Michel Foucault, Jean-Paul Sartre, Gilles Deleuze, Jacques Derrida and Félix Guattari. Their writings were published in prominent French newspapers, such as Le Monde and Libération. During his career, Scherer wrote extensively on the topic of pedophilia from 1974 to 1979 and advocated for sexual relations between minors and across people of different generations.

==== Among gay activists ====
According to researcher Theo Sandfort, pedophiles had been seen as a sub-category of homosexuals until 1958. Attraction to boys was, to a degree, considered part of homosexual culture in Europe, and imagery associated with Greek pederasty was common. This blurring of distinctions, Sansfort says, explains the absence of any specific pedophile group up to that point. Opposition to pro-pedophile organizations among homosexual circles has existed to varying degrees over time, with British, American and Scandinavian groups being more reluctant to support pedophile organizations than their German, Spanish, French and Latin American counterparts. In the 1970s, during Anita Bryant's Save Our Children campaign, most American homosexual activists started to dissociate from pro-pedophile groups in the United States, which contributed to the subsequent creation of NAMBLA. The prosecution of PIE's leaders in the early 1980s also pushed some initially-friendly gay groups away from supporting the pro-pedophile organization.

A conflation of LGBTQ rights movements with pro-pedophilia activism is common amongst anti-LGBTQ activists, alleging that LGBTQ people engage in child grooming and are more likely to molest children, despite such claims having no factual basis. In 2018, anti-LGBTQ activists carried out a false flag operation, creating rainbow posters reading "Pedophiles are people too", making them appear to have originated from LGBTQ activists.

=== 21st century ===
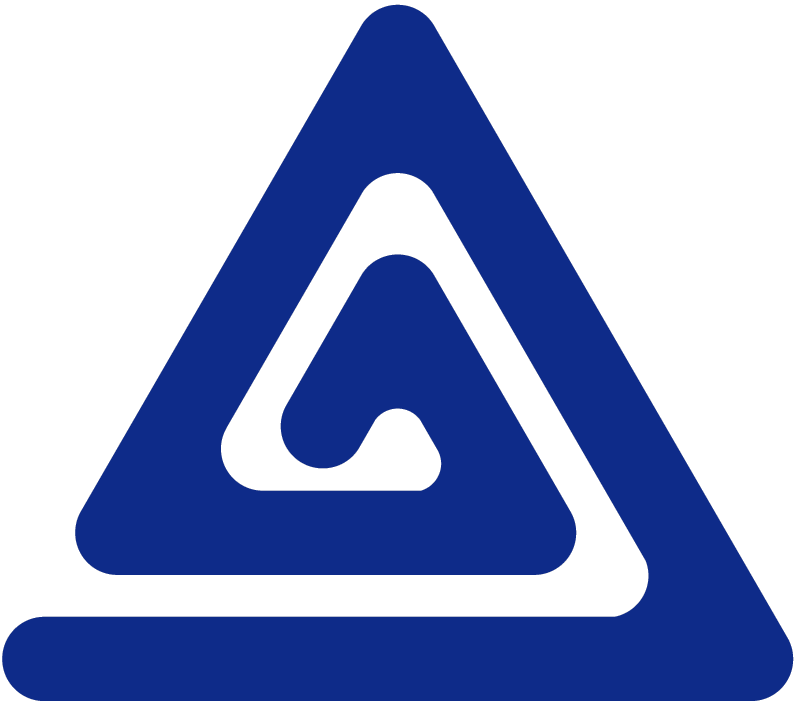
The boylove logo, a symbol used by some pedophile groups

With the development of the Internet, many pedophile groups started to advocate for adult-child sex online. As of 2009, the Internet had 64 websites in 15 different languages that advocated for sexual activities between adults and children.

Some traditional pedophile organizations, such as NAMBLA, have migrated to the Internet. The Free Spirits group, which has been funded by donations coming from its own members, has been one of the biggest known pedophile organizations online and has loaned websites to Dutch, German and Danish pedophile support groups, though they do not advocate for "physical contact" between adults and children. The Canada-based Ganymède group has also maintained similar websites. Pro-pedophile organizations have also produced online resources, such as the Wikipedia-inspired Girlwiki and Boywiki, that advocate for sex between adults and children. The Boylove Manifesto, which has been shared by multiple online pedophile groups, states that sex between men and boys is not immoral and demands that age of consent laws be reconsidered.

== Characteristics ==
As part of their support of adult-child sex, pedophile advocacy groups support the elimination or significant weakening of age of consent laws. They also support legalizing child pornography and many groups that distribute such material illegally.

Pedophile advocacy groups often engage in neutralizing behaviors, such as denial of injury, denial of victim and condemnation of those who oppose adult-child sexual acts. They engage in denial of victim by asserting that children are not victims of adult sexual behavior, but rather willing partners who are able to consent to sexual acts. This phenomenon is illustrated by a NAMBLA statement asserting that "if a child and adult want to have sex, they should be free to do so. Consent is the critical point... force and coercion are abhorrent to NAMBLA". Such beliefs contradict the academic literature that asserts that sexual behaviors between adults and children are harmful.

These groups also engage in condemnation of the condemners, a neutralizing behavior, by asserting that larger society is hypocritical and guilty of the same or even more victimizing acts that it accuses pedophiles of. This belief is illustrated by the following excerpt coming from their literature: "The 'protectors' of children are the real perverts, the real child abusers, the real molesters who take advantage of innocence and inexperience to spread the venom of guilt and fear."

Aside from pre-Internet organizations such as the René Guyon Society and the Childhood Sensuality Circle, the use of neutralizing behaviors has also been observed in online pedophile advocacy environments. These groups often establish boundaries that separates their own subculture from general society.

== See also ==
- Tom O'Carroll
- Ian Dunn
- David Thorstad
- Bill Andriette
- Child sexuality
