= French petitions against age-of-consent laws =

Petition to review age-of-consent laws

In 1977 and 1979, several petitions were signed by a number of prominent French intellectuals, doctors, and psychologists calling for reforms to or the abolition of the French age-of-consent law. A January 1977 petition published in Le Monde criticized the Affaire de Versailles—the detention of three men arrested for sex offences against children aged 12–13. A May 1977 petition addressed at the French Parliament called for the equalization of homosexual and heterosexual ages of consent. A 1979 petition published in Libération defended a man arrested for sexual relations with girls aged 6–12.

== Background ==
In 1945, an ordinance was enacted by the French government that established an age of consent in France of 15. However, an article within this ordinance forbade sodomy and similar "sexual relations against nature" with any person under the age of 21. In 1974, this was lowered to 18. This was perceived by activists, including Michel Foucault and Guy Hocquenghem, as being discriminatory against gay men.

Michel Foucault argued that it is intolerable to assume that a minor is incapable of giving meaningful consent to sexual relations. Foucault also believed consent, as a concept, was a "contractual notion", and that it was not a sufficient measure of whether harm was being conducted. Foucault, Sartre, and newspapers such as Libération and Le Monde each defended the idea of sexual relationships with minors.

== January 1977 petition ==
On 26 January 1977 an open letter, written by Gabriel Matzneff and signed by 69 people, was published in Le Monde, presenting a defense of those placed in pre-trial detention for sexual relations with children under the age of 15. In particular, the letter addresses the Affaire de Versailles, a 1973 incident in which three men—Bernard Dejager, Jean-Claude Gallien, and Jean Burckardt—were arrested for non-violent sex offences against children aged 12–13. The letter, published the day before their trial, criticizes the French legal system for the long pre-trial detention of the three men and argues that the children had consented, but that the law had denied them their right to consent. Finally, the letter claims that the law is inconsistent—it argues that if minors aged 13 had the "capacity for discernment" to be held responsible for a crime, then the law should provide them with the same capacity to consent.

=== Signatories to the January petition ===
The signatories to the January 1977 petition included Gabriel Matzneff (the petition's author), Jean-Louis Bory, Pierre Hahn, Jean-Luc Hennig, Guy Hocquenghem, Françoise d'Eaubonne, René Schérer, Pierre Guyotat, Louis Aragon, Francis Ponge, Roland Barthes, Simone de Beauvoir, Philippe Sollers, Patrice Chéreau, Bernard Kouchner, François Châtelet, Gilles Deleuze, Félix Guattari, Jean-Paul Sartre, and Jean-François Lyotard.

Notably, the signatories did not include Michel Foucault, Marguerite Duras, Hélène Cixous, or Xavière Gauthier, who all refused to sign the January petition.

Philippe Sollers later stated in 2001 that "there were so many manifestos, we signed them almost automatically". In 2013, Gabriel Matzneff revealed on his blog that he had written the letter and criticized various signatories which he viewed were erasing or backtracking on their signature.

== May 1977 petition ==
In May 1977, a petition was signed by 80 French intellectuals, calling for the end of discrimination against homosexual men encoded in the 1945 ordinance. It also asks that the Penal Code Revision Commission (French: Commission de Révision du Code Pénal) review the age of consent and recommend changes to parliament.

=== Signatories to the May petition ===
The May 1977 petition was signed by a number of prominent French intellectuals, doctors, and psychologists from a wide range of political positions, including Michel Foucault, Gilles Deleuze, Jacques Derrida, Louis Aragon, Roland Barthes, Louis Althusser, Simone de Beauvoir, Jean-Paul Sartre, Félix Guattari, Michel Leiris, Alain Robbe-Grillet, Philippe Sollers, Jacques Rancière, Jean-François Lyotard, Francis Ponge, Jean Danet, Françoise Dolto, Bernard Besret, and Gabriel Matzneff.

On 4 April 1978 a conversation between Michel Foucault, Jean Danet and Guy Hocquenghem detailing the reasons for their positions was broadcast by the radio channel France Culture during the program Dialogues. In the conversation, which was later republished as "Sexual Morality and the Law", the three discussed the petition and concluded that consent as a legal concept is a contractual notion and thus a "trap", saying that "no one makes a contract before making love".

== 1979 petition ==
In 1979, a petition was published in Libération, supporting Gérard R., who was arrested for having sexual relations with girls aged six to twelve living at his home. The petition argued that the girls were "happy" with the situation. The letter was later reproduced in the paper L'Express, in the issue of 7 March 2001.

== Legacy ==
In 1982, the French government removed its clauses regarding sodomy and similar acts "against nature" from the 1945 ordinance.

== See also ==
- Age-of-consent reform in the United Kingdom
- Paedophile Information Exchange
