= Daniel C. Tsang =

American activist and scholar

Daniel Chun-Tuen Tsang (Chinese: 曾振鍛; Jyutping: Zang1 Zan3-dyun3), born 1949) is an American activist and scholar whose writings have been of great importance in the Asian American and LGBT political movements.

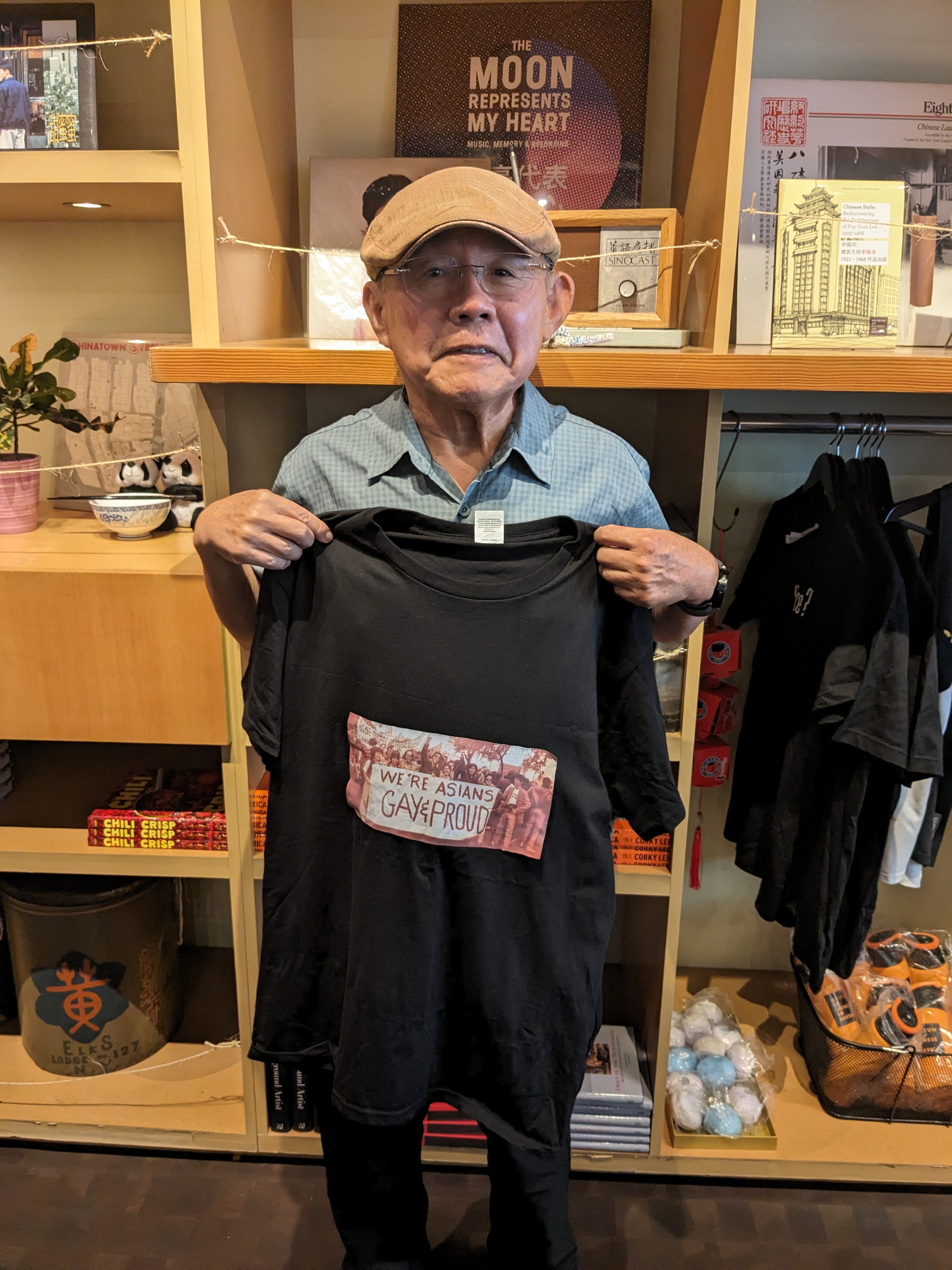
Daniel Tsang holds a t-shirt with a photo from a 1979 protest where he and others hold a banner that reads "We're Asians - Gay & Proud."

== Education ==
Tsang graduated with a Bachelor of Arts in Government from the University of Redlands in 1971. He later received a Master of Arts in Political Science in 1973 and a Master of Library Sciences in 1977, both from the University of Michigan.

== Career ==
Tsang worked with early activist organizations such as the Gay Liberation Front in Ann Arbor, Michigan, the Graduate Employees' Organization (GEO), and East Wind, an Asian American activist organization. Tsang also worked as a librarian for Temple University, Community College of Philadelphia, Free Library of Philadelphia and the University of California, Irvine.

In 1975, Tsang wrote the first manifesto about being gay and Asian, "Gay Awareness," for the Basement Workshop's publication, Bridge.

In 1978 Tsang attended what he described as the founding meeting of the North American Man/Boy Love Association (NAMBLA), a pro-paedophilia advocacy organisation. He edited the 1981 volume The Age Taboo: Gay Male Sexuality, Power, and Consent, a publication that argued in favor of the legalization of sex between adults and children, child prostitution, and child pornography. As of 1989 he was a member of the Southern California chapter of NAMBLA.

In 1979, Tsang organized the first Asian American gay and lesbian protest march with activist Don Kao, at the first National Third World Lesbian and Gay Conference at Howard University.

Tsang's career has combined librarianship with activism. Key areas include organizing for queer rights among Asians, queer liberation, union rights, documenting social change, and archiving protest. Tsang's scholarship has focused on data archiving and data management. He has also documented the way data sets can be identified for research. His assessment of sustainability for research library collections was the focus of a presentation at the Hong Kong University of Science and Technology.

During Tsang's career he has also identified resources that document protest movements such as the First March for Lesbian and Gay Rights, the U.S. Underground and Alternative Press of the 1960s and '70s and the Umbrella Movement.

Tsang's radio program (archives via podcast) Subversity was broadcast on KUCI (88.9 fm) in Irvine, California from 1993 to 2011.

Tsang's archival papers will be accessible at the Tamiment Library and Robert F. Wagner Archives at New York University.
