= Pan Africa ILGA =

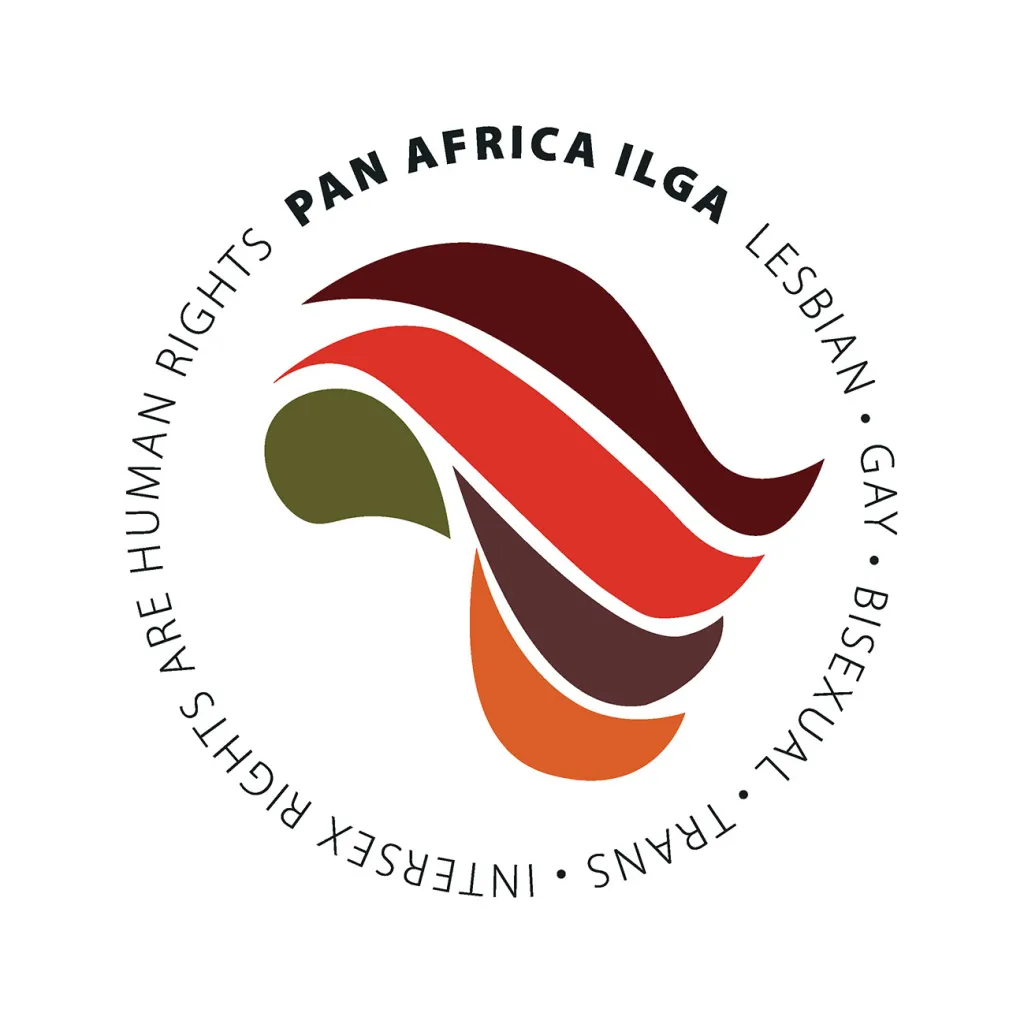
- Official logo of the Pan Africa ILGA
- Formation: 2007
- Headquarters: Johannesburg, Guateng
- Location: South Africa
- Co-Chair: Barbara Wangare
- Co-Chair: Star Rugori
- Executive Director: Nate Brown
- Parent organization: ILGA
- Staff: 11 – 50
- Website: https://panafricailga.org/

Pan Africa ILGA (PAI) is the African region of the International Lesbian, Gay, Bisexual, Trans and Intersex Association (ILGA).

Pan Africa ILGA is based in South Africa but holds annual regional conferences in different locations in Africa. Its third regional conference was held in Botswana in June 2018. Pan Africa ILGA planned to hold its 2020 conference in West Africa, scheduling the conference to take place in Accra, Ghana in July 2020. However, they faced religious opposition. An Ashanti regional chief and imam voiced opposition, and Christian groups also voiced protest, leading the government of Ghana to ban the conference.

== Executive Board ==
| Profile | Name | Position | Country of origin | Tenure |
|---|---|---|---|---|
| A passionate East African gender minority rights activist, African queer, and trans feminist from Kenya who is the Executive director of East Africa Trans Health & Advocacy Network (EATHAN). An East African network of trans and gender-diverse activists and organizations. She is instrumental in her role in the advocacy and representation of 26 trans & gender-diverse organizations and activists in Burundi, Kenya, Rwanda, Tanzania, and Uganda to achieve legal, medical & social gender recognition in East Africa. With over 10 years of experience in trans & gender-diverse advocacy as well as SOGIESC in Africa & globally, she has made strides in TGD movement growth in Africa. She is a 2021 OutRight Action International United Nations Religion Fellow who sits on several boards and committees such as The Interim Governing Body of the African Trans Network (ATN), a sub-regional network of TGD networks and organizations that amplify trans & gender-diverse Africans' voices collectively on the continent of Africa and globally; The Steering Committee of the International Trans Fund; The Executive Board of Pan Africa ILGA (PAI) and The Alternate Co-Secretary General of the ILGA World Board. | Barbara Wangare | Co-Chair | Kenya | 2021 -2023 |
| Rugori has a track record of building capacities of organizations through community-led initiatives focused on upholding human rights and dignity within regional and international human rights frameworks. He was awarded a Bachelor of Political Economy from the University of Burundi. He currently serves on the Pan Africa ILGA board as a Co-chair for 2021-2023. | Star Rugori | Co-Chair | Burundi | 2021 -2023 |
| A Nigerian-Cameroonian writer and Gender Inclusion Specialist teaching, training and sensitizing people and groups across communities on the need for gender equality, feminism and LGBT+ Rights inclusion. | Marline Oluchi | Secretary | Nigeria | 2021 -2023 |
