= David Thorstad =

American pro-pedophile activist (1941–2021)

- Born: October 15, 1941; Thief River Falls, Minnesota, U.S.
- Died: August 1, 2021 (aged 79); Fargo, North Dakota, U.S.
- Known for: Pro-pedophile activism with NAMBLA

David Thorstad (October 15, 1941 – August 1, 2021) was an American pro-pederast and political activist who co-founded or ran a number of gay rights groups in the 1970s, including as a former president of New York's Gay Activists Alliance. He later engaged in pro-pedophilia and pederasty activism with the North American Man/Boy Love Association (NAMBLA), of which he was a founding member.

== Early activism ==
Thorstad was active in Trotskyist politics for some years. For more than six years, he was a member of the Upper West Side branch of the Socialist Workers Party (SWP) and a staff writer for its newspaper, The Militant. He left the SWP in December 1973, citing the organization's lack of enthusiasm for the gay liberation movement and failure to develop a "Marxist materialist analysis" of it. In 1976 he self-published a collection of internal party documents relating to its discussion of the gay liberation movement under the title Gay Liberation and Socialism: Documents from the Discussions on Gay Liberation Inside the Socialist Workers Party (1970-1973).

In the early 1970s, Thorstad was president of the Gay Activists Alliance, a leading gay liberation group in New York.

In June 1973, Thorstad and John Lauritsen published "The Early Homosexual Rights Movement (1864-1935)" in the SWP internal Discussion Bulletin, attempting to prove that the gay liberation movement had a long and substantial history, particularly in Germany. This 14-page historical survey was expanded the next year into a 92-page book of the same name published by Times Change Press, a New York publishing house specializing in feminist and politically progressive books. The book was translated into Spanish and German.

In 1977, Thorstad founded the Coalition for Lesbian and Gay Rights.

== Pedophilia and pederasty activism ==
Thorstad described himself as a bisexual pederast and atheist (a "recovered" Pentecostal) who had "never been charged with violating any sex laws".

In 1978, he became a co-founder of NAMBLA, and "served as a member of the Steering Committee from some undetermined time until September 1996". He was one of a group of NAMBLA members who were sued in 2000 for the wrongful death of a ten-year-old boy in a long-running court case Curley v. NAMBLA in Boston.

Thorstad claimed that "pederasty is probably historically the most common form of homosexuality in Western culture, as well as many other cultures", and that "child abuse hysteria is an industry of insanity aimed at homosexuals [which] ... plays on the impression people have always had of homosexuals as being child molesters." He described opposition to NAMBLA as "... [similar] to one waged by 'lesbian feminists who jumped right on the bandwagon' of what he called the anti-gay male/child pornography scare", according to The Advocate. He also likened being a pederast in the United States to being "a Jew in Nazi Germany" and criticized the mainstream LGBT community for its assimilationist approach towards capitalist and heterocentric society. He said that the label LGBT is "the most absurd one of all" and is "far too fixed an identity, eliding the fluidity of sexuality and sexual behavior ... in that sense[,] Kinsey's scale is valid." He also maintained that "assimilationist homosexual groups[,] ... the psychiatric profession and the bourgeois media, such as the New York Times ... all nowadays blur distinctions by lumping everything under the rubric 'pedophilia,' an absurdity apparently intended to criminalize love and force very different behaviors into one negative pigeonhole."

Summaries of Thorstad's views appear in his essays "Man/Boy Love and the American Gay Movement" and "Homosexuality and the American Left: The Impact of Stonewall".

== Later views and legacy ==
With the turn of the millennium, Thorstad became a critic of the way in which the sexual liberationist goals of gay politics were replaced by the identity politics that came to dominate the movement. For example, he came to oppose pursuing same-sex marriage and the inclusion of transgender people in the gay rights movement.

David Thorstad's archival papers are now held at the University of Minnesota.

== Writings ==
- Israel: a colonial-settler state? by Maxime Rodinson New York, Monad Press; distributed by Pathfinder Press, 1973 (translated from the French by Thorstad)
- The Early Homosexual Rights Movement (1864-1935) New York; Times Change Press, 1974 with John Lauritsen
- Gay Liberation and Socialism : Documents from the Discussions on Gay Liberation Inside the Socialist Workers Party (1970-1973) pt.2, pt.3 editor, [New York] : Thorstad, [introd. 1976]
- No apologies: the unauthorized publication of internal discussion documents of the Socialist Workers Party (SWP) concerning lesbian/gay male liberation. Part 2, 1975-79 editor, [New York : D.Thorstad]; New York (415 W. 23rd St., Box 11F, New York 10011) 1980
- Le Gay Voyage: Guide et regard homosexuels sur les grandes métropoles interviewee, [New York : D. Thorstad]; Paris (22 rue Huyghens, 75014): Albin Michel, 1980
- A Witchhunt foiled: the FBI vs. NAMBLA New York : North American Man/Boy Love Association, 1985 (introduction)
- Man/Boy Love and the American Gay Movement by David Thorstad (1991, Haworth Press, Inc.)
- Homosexuality and the American Left by David Thorstad (1995, Haworth Press, Inc.)
- Harry Hay on Man/Boy Love by David Thorstad
- Pederasty and Homosexuality by David Thorstad
- Various articles at MRZine
