= Pedophile Group =

Danish pedophile advocacy organisation

- Formation: 1985
- Dissolved: 2004
- Headquarters: Denmark
- Region served: Denmark
- Official language: Danish
- Website: http://www.danped.fpc.li/ (Archived from the original on 9 June 2007)

The Pedophile Group, Pedophile Group Association or Danish Pedophile Association was a Danish organisation which was disbanded on 21 March 2004. A website is still running, operated by a group of active members of the former association. It was founded in 1985.

On 23 July 1996, the group had eighty registered members and participated in an International Congress in Denmark. It was also connected with the pedophile advocacy organisation Ipce (formerly the International Pedophile and Child Emancipation). A 2004 newspaper article identified Dan Markussen as the organization's spokesman.

In 2000, a Danish TV documentary team went undercover to investigate the group. Members were shown exchanging child porn and giving advice on how to contact children in internet chatrooms. A man was arrested by police in connection with the investigation.

In 2000, the group asked its members to provide misleading information to authorities to help Eric Franklin Rosser evade prosecution. Rosser was a former member of John Mellencamp's band who had been charged with producing and distributing child pornography. He was convicted in 2001, however, and was added to the U.S. Federal Bureau of Investigation's most wanted list.

In 2004, the Danish newspaper Dagbladet Information ran a front-page article by the journalist Kristian Ditlev Jensen calling for the organisation's home page to be taken down. Similar criticism of the groups came from papers such as Berlingske, Jyllands-Posten and Politiken.

In 2004, the Danish Parliament of the 2001 Danish general election voted for the dissolution of the association.
