= René Guyon Society =

American pedophile organization

- Formation: 1962
- Headquarters: California, United States
- Origins: Los Angeles, California
- Official language: English
- President: Tim O'Hara

The René Guyon Society was the first American organization that has advocated for sexual relationships between adults and children. It was founded in Los Angeles, California, in 1962 by a group of parents who had participated in a symposium on human sexuality.

It was named after René Guyon, a former French judge who served on the Supreme Court of Thailand for 30 years and who, apart from traditional judicial work, wrote on sexual ethics in his work The Ethics of Sexual Acts. Guyon had previously advocated for adult-child sex.

According to Mary DeYoung, the group has called for statutory rape laws to be abolished. It argued that parents should be able to allow their children to engage in sexual acts with adults. The group has counseled parents who are reluctant, yet open, to that view. The entity's motto was "sex before eight, or else it's too late."

The group's president Tim O'Hara, in a 1977 hearing before the U.S. House Education Subcommittee on Healthy Families and Communities, stated that the organization had 5,000 members in the country. It has been defunct since the mid-1980s.

== See also ==
- Pedophile advocacy groups
