= North American Man/Boy Love Association =

American pedophilia advocacy organization

- A NAMBLA logo. The capital M and lowercase b symbolize a man and a boy.
- Founded: December 2, 1978; 47 years ago
- Founder: David Thorstad
- Type: Unincorporated association
- Purpose: Pedophilia and pederasty activism
- Location(s): New York City and San Francisco
- Region served: North America
- Method: Removing age-of-consent laws

The North American Man/Boy Love Association (NAMBLA, stylized as NAMbLA) is a pedophilia and pederasty advocacy organization in the United States. It works to abolish age-of-consent laws criminalizing adult sexual involvement with minors and campaigns for the release of men who have been jailed for sexual contacts with minors that did not involve what it considers coercion.

The group no longer holds regular national meetings, and as of the late 1990s—to avoid local police infiltration—the organization discouraged the formation of local chapters. Around 1995, an undercover detective discovered there were 1,100 people on the organization's rolls. NAMBLA was the largest group in International Pedophile and Child Emancipation (IPCE), an international pro-pedophile activist organization. Since then, the organization has dwindled to only a handful of people, with many members joining online pedophile networks, according to Xavier Von Erck, director of operations at the anti-pedophile organization Perverted-Justice. As of 2005, a newspaper report stated that NAMBLA was based in New York City and San Francisco.

== History ==
Events such as Anita Bryant's 1977 "Save Our Children" campaign and a police raid of a Toronto-area newspaper, The Body Politic, for publishing an article by Gerald Hannon sympathetic to "boy-love" set the stage for the founding of NAMBLA.

In December 1977, police raided a house in the Boston suburb Revere. Twenty-four men were arrested and indicted on over 100 felony counts of the statutory rape of boys aged eight to fifteen. Suffolk County district attorney Garrett H. Byrne found the men had used drugs and video games to lure the boys into a house, where they photographed them as they engaged in sexual activity. The men were members of a "sex ring"; Byrne said the arrest was "the tip of the iceberg". Commenting on this issue, Boston magazine described NAMBLA as "the most despised group of men in America", which was "founded mostly by eccentric, boy-loving leftists". The "Boston-Boise Committee", a gay rights organization, was formed in response to these events (which they termed the "Boston witch-hunt"), allegedly in order to promote solidarity amongst gay men, saying in an official leaflet that: "The closet is weak. There is strength in unity and openness." NAMBLA's founding was inspired by this organization. It was co-founded by gay-rights activist and socialist David Thorstad.

In 1982, a NAMBLA member was falsely linked to the disappearance of Etan Patz. Although the accusation was groundless, the negative publicity was disastrous to the organization. NAMBLA published a book A Witchhunt Foiled: The FBI vs. NAMBLA, which documented these events. In testimony before the United States Senate, NAMBLA was exonerated from criminal activities; it said, "It is the pedophile with no organized affiliations who is the real threat to children".

Mike Echols, the author of I Know My First Name Is Steven, infiltrated NAMBLA and recorded his observations in his book, which was published in 1991. Echols published the names, addresses and telephone numbers of eighty suspected NAMBLA members on his website, which led to death threats being made to people who were not members of the organization.

Onell R. Soto, a San Diego Union-Tribune writer, wrote in February 2005, "Law enforcement officials and mental health professionals say that while NAMBLA's membership numbers are small, the group has a dangerous ripple effect through the Internet by sanctioning the behavior of those who would abuse children".

=== ILGA controversy ===
In 1993, the International Lesbian and Gay Association (ILGA) achieved United Nations consultative status. NAMBLA's membership in ILGA drew heavy criticism and caused the suspension of ILGA. Many gay organizations called for the ILGA to dissolve ties with NAMBLA. Republican Senator Jesse Helms proposed a bill to withhold US$119 million in UN contributions until U.S. President Bill Clinton could certify that no UN agency grants any official status to organizations that condoned pedophilia. The bill was unanimously approved by Congress and signed into law by Clinton in April 1994.

In 1994, ILGA expelled NAMBLA—the first U.S.-based organization to be a member—as well as Vereniging Martijn and Project Truth, because they were judged to be "organizations with a predominant aim of supporting or promoting pedophilia". Although ILGA removed NAMBLA, the UN reversed its decision to grant ILGA special consultative status. Repeated attempts by ILGA to regain special status with the UN succeeded in 2006.

Partially in response to the NAMBLA situation, Gregory King of the Human Rights Campaign later said, "NAMBLA is not a gay organization ... they are not part of our community and we thoroughly reject their efforts to insinuate that pedophilia is an issue related to gay and lesbian civil rights". NAMBLA said, "man/boy love is by definition homosexual", that "the Western homosexual tradition from Socrates to Wilde to Gide ... [and] many non Western homo sexualities from New Guinea and Persia to the Zulu and the Japanese" were formed by pederasty, that "man/boy lovers are part of the gay movement and central to gay history and culture", and that "homosexuals denying that it is 'not gay' to be attracted to adolescent boys are just as ludicrous as heterosexuals saying it's 'not heterosexual' to be attracted to adolescent girls".

=== Curley v. NAMBLA ===
In 2000, a Boston couple, Robert and Barbara Curley, sued NAMBLA for the wrongful death of their son. According to the suit, defendants Charles Jaynes and Salvatore Sicari, who were convicted of murdering the Curleys' son Jeffrey, "stalked ... tortured, murdered and mutilated [his] body on or about October 1, 1997. Upon information and belief immediately prior to said acts, Charles Jaynes accessed NAMBLA's website at the Boston Public Library." The lawsuit said, "NAMBLA serves as a conduit for an underground network of pedophiles in the United States who use their NAMBLA association and contacts therein and the Internet to obtain and promote pedophile activity". Jaynes wrote in his diary, "This was a turning point in discovery of myself ... NAMBLA's Bulletin helped me to become aware of my own sexuality and acceptance of it ... ".

Citing cases in which NAMBLA members were convicted of sexual offenses against children, Larry Frisoli, the attorney representing the Curleys, said the organization is a "training ground" for adults who wish to seduce children, in which men exchange strategies to find and groom child sex partners. Frisoli also said NAMBLA has sold on its website "The Rape and Escape Manual", which gave details about the avoidance of capture and prosecution. The American Civil Liberties Union (ACLU) stepped in to defend NAMBLA as a free speech matter; it won a dismissal because NAMBLA is organized as an unincorporated association rather than a corporation. John Reinstein, director of the ACLU Massachusetts, said although NAMBLA "may extol conduct which is currently illegal", there was nothing on its website that "advocated or incited the commission of any illegal acts, including murder or rape".

A NAMBLA founder said the case would "break our backs, even if we win, which we will". Media reports from 2006 said that for practical purposes the group no longer exists and that it consists only of a website maintained by a few enthusiasts. The Curleys continued the suit as a wrongful death action against individual NAMBLA members, some of whom were active in the group's leadership. Targets of the wrongful death suits included NAMBLA co-founder David Thorstad. The lawsuit was dropped in April 2008 after a judge ruled that a key witness was not competent to testify.

== Support ==
Allen Ginsberg, poet and father of the Beat Generation, was an affiliated member of NAMBLA. Claiming to have joined the organization "in defense of free speech", Ginsberg said: "Attacks on NAMBLA stink of politics, witchhunting for profit, humorlessness, vanity, anger and ignorance ... I'm a member of NAMBLA because I love boys too—everybody does, who has a little humanity". He appeared in Chicken Hawk: Men Who Love Boys, produced and directed by Adi Sideman, a documentary in which members of NAMBLA gave interviews and presented defenses of the organization.

Pat Califia argued that politics played an important role in the gay community's rejection of NAMBLA. Califia has since withdrawn much of his earlier support for the association while still maintaining that discussing an issue does not constitute criminal activity.

Camille Paglia, feminist academic and social critic, signed a manifesto supporting the group in 1993. In 1994, Paglia supported lowering the legal age of consent to fourteen. She noted in a 1995 interview with pro-pedophile activist Bill Andriette "I fail to see what is wrong with erotic fondling with any age." In a 1997 Salon column, Paglia expressed the view that male pedophilia correlates with the heights of a civilization, stating "I have repeatedly protested the lynch-mob hysteria that dogs the issue of man-boy love. In Sexual Personae, I argued that male pedophilia is intricately intertwined with the cardinal moments of Western civilization." Paglia noted in several interviews, as well as Sexual Personae, that she supports the legalization of certain forms of child pornography. She later had a change of heart on the matter. In an interview for Radio New Zealand's Saturday Morning show, conducted on April 28, 2018, by Kim Hill, Paglia was asked, "Are you a libertarian on the issue of pedophilia?", to which she replied

In terms of the present day, I think it's absolutely impossible to think we could reproduce the Athenian code of pedophilia, of boy-love, that was central to culture at that time. ... We must protect children, and I feel that very very strongly. The age of consent for sexual interactions between a boy and an older man is obviously disputed, at what point that should be. I used to think that fourteen (the way it is in some places in the world) was adequate. I no longer think that. I think young people need greater protection than that. ... This is one of those areas that we must confine to the realm of imagination and the history of the arts.

=== Feigned support ===
In a 2017 protest at Columbia University against Mike Cernovich, an unidentified individual raised a pro-pedophilia banner showing logos from NAMBLA and some leftist organizations (all denying knowledge of any such cooperation). Fact-checking organizations consider this a false flag operation as alt-right personalities were quick to repost the photo without caveat and because NAMBLA had largely ceased operation by 2016. A similar 4chan hoax in 2018 connected NAMBLA with TED, following a controversial TEDx presentation—notably unvetted by the TED organization—referring to pedophilia as an "unchangeable sexual orientation".

== Opposition ==
The first documented opposition to NAMBLA from LGBTQ organizations occurred at the conference that organized the first gay march on Washington in 1979.

In 1980, a group called the Lesbian Caucus distributed a flyer urging women to split from the annual New York City Gay Pride March, because according to the group, the organizing committee had been dominated by NAMBLA and its supporters. The next year, after some lesbians threatened to picket, the Cornell University group Gay People at Cornell (Gay PAC) rescinded its invitation to NAMBLA co-founder David Thorstad to be the keynote speaker at the annual May Gay Festival. In the following years, gay rights groups tried to block NAMBLA's participation in gay pride parades, prompting leading gay rights figure Harry Hay to wear a sign proclaiming "NAMBLA walks with me" as he participated in a 1986 gay pride march in Los Angeles.

By the mid-1980s, NAMBLA was virtually alone in its positions and found itself politically isolated. Support for "groups perceived as being on the fringe of the gay community," such as NAMBLA, vanished in the process.

In 1994, Stonewall 25, a New York LGBTQ rights group, voted to ban NAMBLA from its international march on the United Nations in June of that year. The same year, NAMBLA was again banned from the march commemorating Stonewall. Instead, members of NAMBLA and the Gay Liberation Front formed their own competing march called "The Spirit of Stonewall". The Gay & Lesbian Alliance Against Defamation (GLAAD) adopted a document called "Position Statement Regarding NAMBLA", which said GLAAD "deplores the North American Man Boy Love Association's (NAMBLA) goals, which include advocacy for sex between adult men and boys and the removal of legal protections for children. These goals constitute a form of child abuse and are repugnant to GLAAD."

That year, the Board of Directors of the National Gay and Lesbian Task Force (NGLTF) adopted a resolution on NAMBLA that said, "NGLTF condemns all abuse of minors, both sexual and any other kind, perpetrated by adults. Accordingly, NGLTF condemns the organizational goals of NAMBLA and any other such organization."

In 2000 in New York, a teacher was fired for his association with NAMBLA. There were no criminal charges or complaints about his conduct in class.

In April 2013, the hacktivist group Anonymous prevented NAMBLA's website from being accessed as part of an operation dubbed "Operation Alice Day". The timing of the attack coincided with Alice Day, a Pedophilia Pride Day celebrated by a small group of pedophiles and their supporters on April 25.

== Associated individuals ==
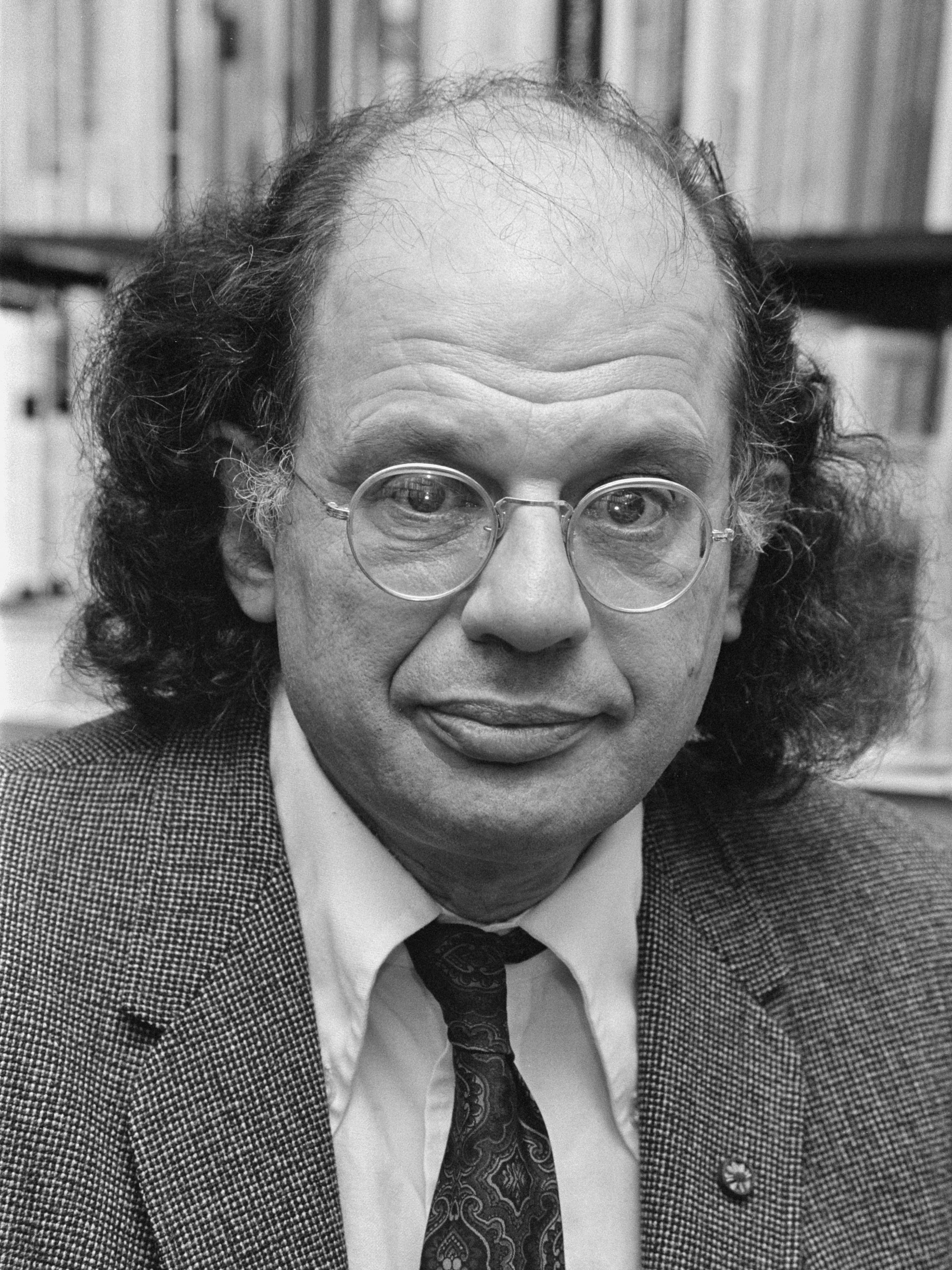
Allen Ginsberg was a member of NAMBLA

- Bill Andriette, journalist. He joined NAMBLA at the age of 15 and edited the NAMBLA Bulletin for six years.
- Allen Ginsberg was a defender of NAMBLA and a member.
- Harry Hay, prominent LGBTQ rights activist. Hay supported NAMBLA's inclusion in gay pride parades and publicly addressed their meetings in support of the organization.
- Alan J. Horowitz, MD, convicted sex offender, ordained Orthodox rabbi, and psychiatrist. He specialized in working with adolescents, graduated magna cum laude from Harvard University, and earned a Ph.D. and medical degree from Duke University. Infamous for being the subject of a worldwide manhunt, Horowitz was known as "NAMBLA Rabbi".
- David Thorstad, founding member.
- Walter Breen, convicted sex offender. He wrote a book, Greek Love, and published a journal, The International Journal of Greek Love, both under the pseudonym "J.Z. Eglinton".
- Peter Lamborn Wilson, also known as Hakim Bey, wrote for NAMBLA's newsletter and endorsed pedophilia.

== See also ==
- Age disparity in sexual relationships
- Chickenhawk (gay slang)
- List of pedophile advocacy organizations
- Paedophile Information Exchange
- Party for Neighbourly Love, Freedom and Diversity
- Pedophile Group
- René Guyon Society
- Vereniging Martijn
