= International Lesbian, Gay, Bisexual, Trans and Intersex Association =

International umbrella organization for LGBTI organizations

- Abbreviation: ILGA World
- Formation: August 1978; 48 years ago
- Type: Nonprofit
- Legal status: UN Ecosoc Consultative Status
- Purpose: LGBTI (lesbian, gay, bisexual, transgender and intersex) rights
- Headquarters: Geneva, Switzerland
- Region served: 170 countries and territories
- Members: 2,000 organisations in 170 countries and territories
- Official language: English and Spanish
- Co-Secretaries General: Kimberly Frost and Yuri Guaiana
- Executive Director: Julia Ehrt
- Website: ilga.org

The International Lesbian, Gay, Bisexual, Trans and Intersex Association (ILGA World) is an LGBTQ+ rights organization.

It participates in a multitude of agendas within the United Nations, such as creating visibility for LGBTQ+ issues by conducting advocacy and outreach at the Human Rights Council, working with members to help their government improve LGBTI rights, ensuring LGBTI members are not forgotten in international law, and advocating for LBTI women's issues at the Commission on the Status of Women.

== History ==
The International Lesbian and Gay Association was founded in 1978 by activists from the United Kingdom, Ireland, Australia, the United States, and elsewhere. Finding it difficult to repeal the criminalization of homosexuality based on the common law tradition, the activists adopted a human rights based framing and focused on international courts, especially the European Court of Human Rights as it was easier to access. ILGA World was involved in the Dudgeon v. United Kingdom (1981) and Norris v. Ireland (1988) cases that led to the repeal of laws criminalizing homosexuality in Northern Ireland and the Republic of Ireland. At the same time, it worked on cases related to unequal ages of consent, military service, transgender rights, asylum and housing rights, but these did not lead to a successful outcome.

The Coventry conference also called upon Amnesty International (AI) to take up the issue of persecution of lesbians and gays. After a 13-year campaign AI made the human rights of lesbians and gays part of its mandate in 1991 and, following the Brazilian Resolution, now advocates for LGBT rights on the international level.

ILGA World obtained consultative status at the United Nations Economic and Social Council (ECOSOC) in mid-1993. Statements were made in the name of ILGA in the 1993 and 1994 sessions of the United Nations Sub-Commission on Prevention of Discrimination and Protection of Minorities and in the 1994 session of the United Nations Commission on Human Rights. ILGA World's NGO status was suspended in September 1994 due to the group's ties with pro-pedophilia organizations such as the North American Man/Boy Love Association. According to then ILGA Secretary-General Hans Hjerpekjon, NAMBLA had officially affiliated with ILGA early in the group's history when it was loosely structured and lacked any formal admission criteria, and had not withdrawn despite ILGA adopting a resolution condemning pedophilia. In June 1994, these groups were expelled from the organization. Later applications for ECOSOC consulatative status were declined in 2002 and 2006, with ILGA alleging external influence from Egypt and the Organization of Islamic Cooperation in the latter instance. In June 2011, the ECOSOC finally granted consultative status to ILGA after a 29 to 14 vote, despite strong opposition from African and Islamic countries. Consultative status gives the ILGA World the ability to attend and speak at UN meetings and participate in Human Rights Council proceedings.

ILGA World, formerly known as International Lesbian and Gay Association, adopted its current full title, the "International Lesbian, Gay, Bisexual, Trans and Intersex Association", in 2008. In 2019, following its World Conference in Wellington, New Zealand, the organisation's membership approved to further update the name into "ILGA World". ILGA has grown to include over 2,600 organizations from over 170 countries and territories to fight for equal rights for lesbian, gay, bisexual, trans and intersex people. ILGA was involved in getting the World Health Organization to drop homosexuality from its list of illnesses.

On 29 October 2024, the ILGA World cancelled a bid from Israeli member organization Aguda, due to be voted on at the 2024 World Conference in Cape Town, to hold an upcoming Conference in 2026 or 2027 in Tel Aviv, following protests from South African delegates and member organizations over human rights and apartheid concerns. Aguda's membership in ILGA World was suspended and placed under review. Prior to the announcement, an emergency motion requesting the dismissal of the bid had been signed by over 70 member organizations worldwide. ILGA World had previously made a statement on 22 October regarding concern over Aguda's bid in which it stated that it did not formally endorse any host proposals until they were voted on by membership, and reaffirming its opposition to the Gaza war and to human rights violations. Aguda, expressing disappointment over the decision, stated its intention to appeal the suspension, while its chairwoman also stated that it had "zero intentions of groveling or begging". One year afterwards, on 1 May 2025, ILGA World lifted the suspension by majority vote, follows an investigation and said that it “took into account that requiring member organizations to take a public stance on their government positions and actions, and holding them accountable for not doing so, would create a precedent that could be harmful to our membership in many countries.”.

In January 2026, it became known that ILGA World was declared undesirable in Russia.

== Structure ==
ILGA World consists of six regional organizations (Pan African ILGA, ILGA Asia, ILGA-Europe, ILGA LAC (Latin America & the Caribbean), ILGA North America and ILGA Oceania) as well as five steering committees (Bisexual, Intersex, Trans, Women's and Youth). ILGA World's Executive Board is led by two co-Secretaries General, and includes one chair from each steering committee and two representatives from each region. Member organizations may register to become members and send delegates to the regional organizations.

=== Conferences ===
According to its constitution, ILGA World has a world conference in which all of its member organisations can attend. The world conference normally sets the time and place for the next conference. However, the Executive Board has used its power under the constitution to set an alternative venue, in the event the venue originally set becomes unviable, as was the case in 2008, when the originally chosen venue of Quebec had to be abandoned due to difficulties encountered by the local organizing committee in raising the necessary funds and the conference had to be held in Vienna instead. The 2010 ILGA World Conference took place in São Paulo, Brazil, the 2012 Conference took place in Stockholm, and the 2014 Conference took place in Mexico City.

- 1978: Coventry
- 1979: Amsterdam/Bergen
- 1980: Barcelona/Santa Cristina d'Aro
- 1981: Turin
- 1982: Washington, D.C.
- 1983: Vienna
- 1984: Helsinki
- 1985: Toronto
- 1986: Copenhagen
- 1987: Cologne
- 1988: Oslo
- 1989: Vienna
- 1990: Stockholm
- 1991: Acapulco
- 1992: Paris
- 1993: Barcelona
- 1994: New York City
- 1995: Rio de Janeiro
- 1997: Cologne
- 1999: Johannesburg
- 2000: Rome
- 2001: Oakland
- 2003: Manila
- 2006: Geneva
- 2008: Vienna
- 2010: São Paulo
- 2012: Stockholm
- 2014: Mexico City
- 2016: Bangkok
- 2019: Wellington
- 2022: Los Angeles/Long Beach
- 2024: Cape Town

Protests often made the conferences that the organization held more dramatic and having more negative attention then would've been wanted. A problem encountered was financial in nature which recently came to a head when an ILGA World conference actually had to be postponed because of lack of funding. In 2022, ILGA held its first world conference since the beginning of the COVID-19 pandemic in Long Beach, California.

=== International Intersex Forum ===
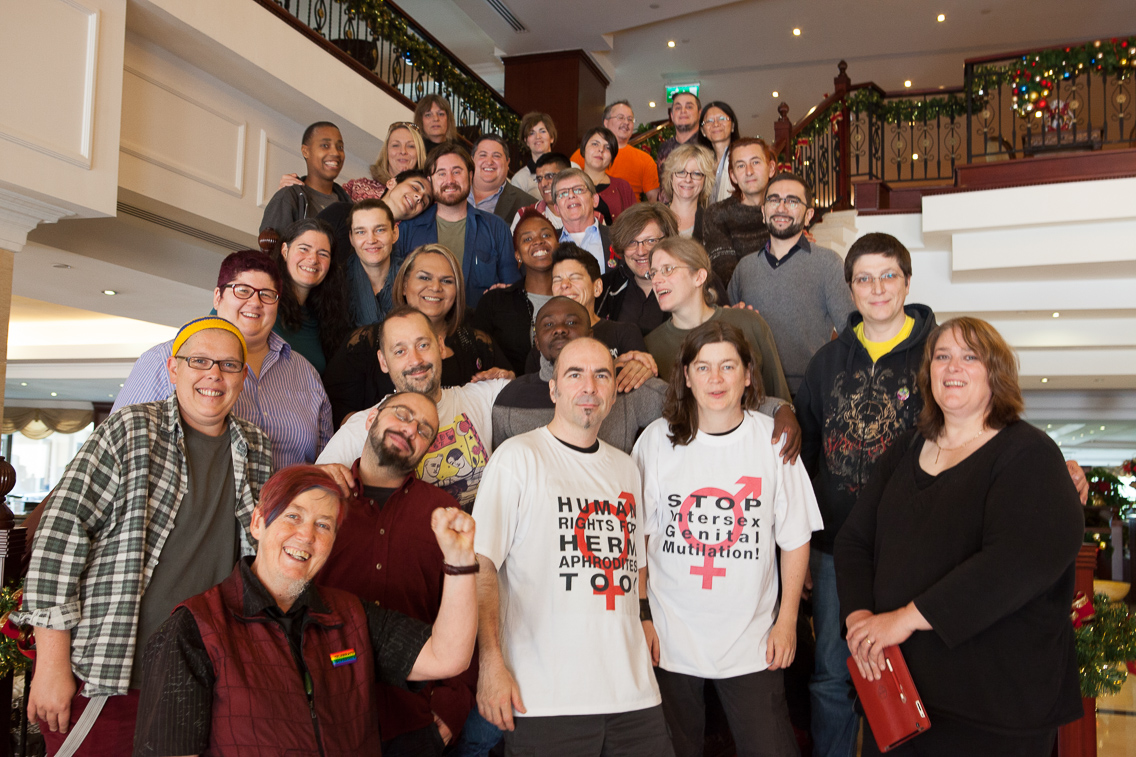
Third International Intersex Forum, Malta, December 2013

With a move to include intersex people in its remit, ILGA World and ILGA-Europe have sponsored the only international gathering of intersex activists and organisations. The International Intersex Forum has taken place annually since 2011.

The third forum was held in Malta with 34 people representing 30 organisations "from all continents". The closing statement affirmed the existence of intersex people, reaffirmed "the principles of the First and Second International Intersex Fora and extend the demands aiming to end discrimination against intersex people and to ensure the right of bodily integrity, physical autonomy and self-determination". For the first time, participants made a statement on birth registrations, in addition to other human rights issues.

== Funding ==
ILGA World's main source of income are donations from governments, organizations, private foundations, amongst the contribution of individuals. In 2020, the total income of ILGA World amounted to 2,213,268 CHF.

== International Pride Awards ==
ILGA World, in association with the United Nations Development Programme (UNDP), launched the International Pride Awards as a global award recognising contributions to LGBTIQ equality.

The inaugural awards were presented in 2024 in South Africa, followed by the second edition in 2026 at the WorldPride Human Rights Conference in Amsterdam.

The awards are presented in five categories:

1. Movement Building in the Face of Hostility: Ruslan Savolainen (2024); COC Nederland (2026).

2. Celebrating Diverse Lives: Immani da Silva (2024); Aggie Dennett Harmon (2026).

3. Emerging Leader: Aaditya Rai (2024); Mmapaseka Steve Letsike (2026).

4. Lifelong Pursuit of Equality: Sonia Corrêa (2024); Marcela Dimonty (2026).

5. Extraordinary Ally: Lize Ehlers (2024); Dr Satendra Singh (2026).

== Reports ==
=== State-Sponsored Homophobia ===
In 2011, ILGA World released its State-Sponsored Homophobia Report and map that brings to light 75 countries that still criminalize same-sex relationships between two consenting adults. These countries are mainly in Africa and in Asia.

In 2016, ILGA World released an updated version of the State-Sponsored Homophobia Report. The report found that "same-sex sexual acts" are illegal in 72 countries. These countries are 37% of the States in the United Nations. Of these 72 countries, 33 are in Africa, 23 are in Asia, 11 are in the Americas, and six are in Oceania.

Historian Samuel Clowes Huneke criticized ILGA World maps for showing most Western and non-Western countries in different colors, stating that while "This division probably make sense to the casual observer... queer scholars and activists have noted that it also has colonial overtones".

=== Curbing Deception ===
In February 2020, ILGA World launched Curbing Deception - A Comprehensive Global Survey on Legal Restrictions of 'Conversion Therapies'. This research report examines laws at both national and subnational levels that prohibit efforts to change sexual orientation, gender identity, and gender expression. Additionally, the report delves into a wide range of techniques historically and currently employed in an attempt to modify the sexual orientation of lesbians, gays, and bisexuals, impede transgender youth from transitioning, induce detransitioning in transgender individuals, or enforce adherence to societal stereotypes of masculinity and femininity regarding gender expression and roles.

=== Our Identities under Arrest ===
Our Identities under Arrest is the first publication specifically focusing on the enforcement of laws that criminalize consensual same-sex sexual acts and diverse gender expressions at a global level. It goes beyond the black letter law to track how these provisions are effectively enforced. The first edition was published in December 2021 and it reviewed over 900 instances in which law enforcement authorities have subjected LGBTQ+ and gender-diverse individuals to fines, arbitrary arrests, prosecutions, corporal punishments, imprisonments, and potentially even the death penalty.

The report provides evidence revealing the significant underreporting of arrests and prosecutions across different countries. It highlights the notable gap between official records on enforcement published by certain governments (such as Morocco, Uzbekistan, Cameroon, and Sri Lanka) and the number of instances documented through alternative sources collected by ILGA World for this report. The report also found that judicial prosecution is a poor indicator to assess levels of enforcement, as arrests and detentions without formal judicial proceedings are the predominant methods of enforcing criminalizing provisions. In many countries, individuals can be detained for extended periods, ranging from several days to weeks or even months, without any form of judicial or administrative review.

The report also highlights the fluctuating nature of the enforcement of criminalizing provisions, which can vary in frequency and intensity over time, with periods characterized by a significant increase in documented instances, followed by periods with no recorded or documented cases of enforcement. The report found that in many criminalizing countries, authorities and law enforcement officials sporadically enforce these provisions in ways that are often unpredictable. Even countries that are considered "safe" or where little information on enforcement is available can experience sudden and unexpected shifts in their approach to these provisions.

=== Global Attitudes Survey ===
In 2016, ILGA World published its 2016 Global Attitudes Survey on LGBTI People. The principal subject surveyed was attitudes about "sexual orientation".

== See also ==
- Pan Africa ILGA
- European Lesbian* Conference
- International Lesbian Information Service (ILIS)
- International Lesbian, Gay, Bisexual, Transgender & Intersex Law Association
- LGBTQ rights by country or territory
- LGBTQ social movements
