= René Guyon =

French jurist and author (1876–1963)

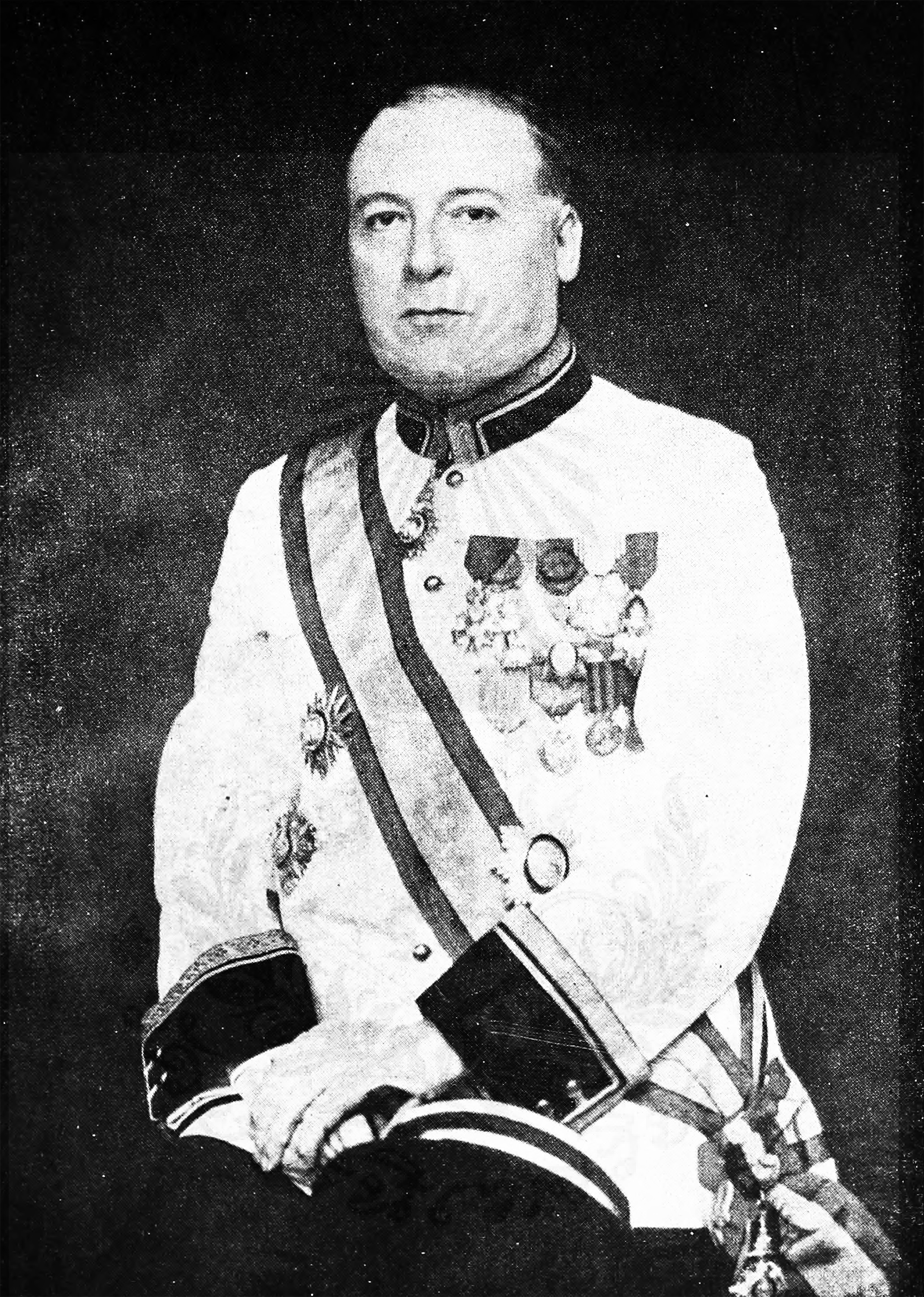
René Charles Guyon

René Charles Marie Guyon (/ɡwɪˈjɔːn/; French: [gɥi.jɔ̃]; 27 May 1876 – 1963) was a French jurist, best known for having written upon the topic of sexual ethics, particularly in his work The Ethics of Sexual Acts.

René Guyon was born at Sedan, Ardennes, and was involved in writing legal codes for Siam (present-day Thailand) and was the head judge of the supreme court of that country, where he was given the Thai name Phichan Bunyong (Thai: พิชาญ บุลยง). He died in 1963 in Bangkok.

Guyon advocated for sex between adults and children. The René Guyon Society, a now-defunct pro-pedophile organization, was named after him, though he did not found the society nor was he involved with it.

== Works ==
- "Human Rights and the Denial of Sexual Freedom" (1951)
- The Ethics of Sexual Acts (La légitimité des actes sexuels), reprinted at the University Press of the Pacific (2001), ISBN 0-89875-369-4
- La liberté sexuelle
