= Vereniging Martijn =

1982–2012 Dutch pro-pedophilia association

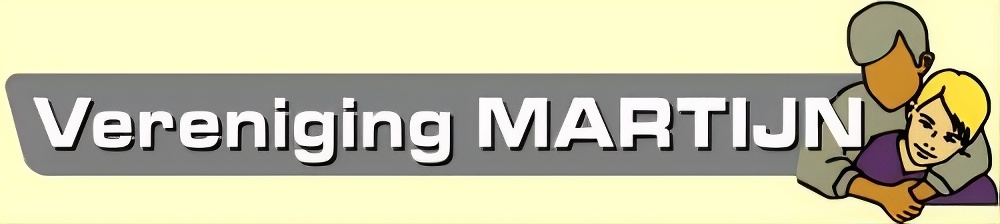
- Formation: 1982; 44 years ago
- Founded at: Hoogeveen, Netherlands
- Dissolved: 27 June 2012; 14 years ago
- Leader: Ad van den Berg
- Website: Official website at the Wayback Machine (archived 10 March 2011)

Vereniging Martijn (Dutch pronunciation: [vəˈreːnəɣɪŋ mɑrˈtɛin]; "Martijn Association"; stylized as MARTIJN) was a Dutch association that advocated the societal acceptance of pedophilia and legalization of sexual relationships between adults and children.

== Establishment ==
The organization began in 1984. It claimed to fight for "the social and societal acceptance of child-adult relationships", emphasising what they called the "consent of both child and adult" and the "freedom for the child to withdraw from the relationship". It claimed to be in favour of "objective, scientifically verifiable truth and against political terror and discrimination."

== OK Magazine ==
From 1986 until 2006, the group published OK Magazine, available only through the mail and not in shops, featuring essays, letters, interviews and photographs of scantily clad or naked children, mostly boys.

== Opposition ==
An article on the Associated Press stated that group was seen as "widely reviled" in the country. In 2003, Vereniging MARTIJN faced opposition by the Actiecomité Stop MARTIJN (Action Committee Stop MARTIJN), which organized demonstrations against them. Formed and led by Michiel Smit of the New Right, Florens van der Kooi of the NNP, as well as Inge Bleecke of Moeders tegen Pedofilie (Mothers against Pedophilia). A demonstration by Smit was cancelled by the mayor of Rotterdam after an anti-fascist group threatend to disrupt it.

== Photographs of Princess Amalia ==
The organization was in the news in October 2007 when it was learned that photographs of Princess Catharina-Amalia, the three year-old daughter of Willem-Alexander, Prince of Orange and his wife Princess Maxima, were on display on the website's forum. The Prince went to court to request a €50,000 fine and the removal of the photos from the website. The court agreed that the photos must be removed, and imposed a fine of €5,000 to be paid every time photos of children of the royal family are placed on the site again. The organisation had to pay €1,235 in costs.

== Police investigations ==
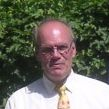
Ad van den Berg

The home of the organization's president, Ad van den Berg, was raided by police in October 2010; downloads of illegal material had been traced back to Van den Berg's internet connection. It was announced in March 2011 that large quantities of child pornography were found among the confiscated material, and even more material, including computers, was confiscated when Van den Berg was arrested on 29 March.

Suspects in the Amsterdam sex case, an investigation into the abuse of tens of children in Amsterdam kindergartens, were members of MARTIJN.

== Priests' involvement ==
On 20 May 2011, Herman Spronck, the head of the Dutch arm of the Salesian Catholic order, confirmed to RTL Nieuws that a priest under him had been on the board of MARTIJN until the Van den Berg raids. He added, "Of course we reject this and distance ourselves from this personal initiative." RTL obtained interviews both with Spronck and the priest (73-year-old "Father Van B.") in which the two defended adult-child sex as not always damaging. The priest concerned had prior convictions for child sexual abuse. The provincial for the Salesians, Jos Claes, opened disciplinary procedures against Spronck.

== Disbandment ==
On 18 June 2011, the Ministry of Security and Justice announced that the association's activities were not illegal. Crimes committed by its members could not be attributed to the association and as such the organisation could not be prosecuted, banned or disbanded.

On 27 June 2012, a Dutch court in Assen ruled that the group was illegal and ordered the group to cease activities and disband immediately. The judge stated that the group's actions and statements regarding sexual contact between adults and children were in conflict with the accepted norms and values of Dutch society. In his statement, the judge emphasised the overriding need to protect children. However, in April 2013, a higher court overturned this decision, upholding the Martijn club's right to freedom of association. On 18 April 2014, the Supreme Court overturned the acquittal and reinstated the trial judge's order. In 2015, an appeal by the association to the European Court for Human Rights (ECHR) was rejected.

== See also ==
- List of pedophile advocacy organizations
- Child pornography laws in the Netherlands
- Dutch Society for Sexual Reform
- Party for Neighbourly Love, Freedom and Diversity
- North American Man/Boy Love Association
- Edward Brongersma
- Joop Wilhelmus
