= Sex offender registry =

Government system to track sexual criminals

A sex offender registry is a system in various countries designed to allow government authorities to keep track of the activities of sex offenders, including those who have completed their criminal sentences.

Sex offender registration is usually accompanied by residential address notification requirements. In many jurisdictions, registered sex offenders are subject to additional restrictions, including on housing. Those on parole or probation may be subject to restrictions that do not apply to other parolees or probationers. These may include (or have been proposed to include) restrictions on being in the presence of underage persons (those below the age of majority), living in proximity to a school or day care center, owning toys or items targeted towards children, or using the Internet.

Sex offender registries exist in many English-speaking countries, including Australia, Canada, New Zealand, the United States, Trinidad and Tobago, Jamaica, South Africa, the United Kingdom, and Ireland. The United States is the only country that allows full public access to the sex offender registry; Canada allows public access to limited information on high risk offenders; all other countries in the English-speaking world have sex offender registries only accessible by law enforcement.

In offense-based systems, registration is required when a person is convicted (or, in some jurisdictions, adjudicated delinquent, found not guilty by reason of insanity, or found not criminally responsible) under one of the listed offenses requiring registration.

== Sex offender registries by country ==
=== Australia ===
The Australian National Child Offender Register (ANCOR) is a web-based system that is used in all states and territories.

Authorized police use ANCOR to monitor persons convicted of child sex offences and other specified offences once they have been released from custody, or after sentencing in the event a non-custodial sentence is imposed.

An offender is required to register as a sex offender within seven days of release or sentencing, and thereafter report all relevant details to police for:

- eight years, if convicted of one Class 2 offence;
- 15 years, if convicted of one Class 1 offence or two Class 2 offences;
- the remainder of their life, if convicted of two or more Class 1 offences, three or more Class 2 offences, one Class 1 offence and one or more Class 2 offences, or of one or more offences of persistent sexual abuse of a child.

Juveniles who are required to register as sex offenders are required to report all relevant details to police for four years, 7½ years, or 15 years.

These above periods are maxima in Tasmania, which allows for any lesser reporting period as is fixed by the court.

On 1 March 2011, there were 12,596 registered offenders across Australia.

On 31 December 2025 Queensland legislation establishing the state's first public child sex offender register, Daniel's Law. The law is named in honour of Daniel Morcombe, a 13-year-old Sunshine Coast boy abducted and murdered in 2003 by a convicted sex offender. The register was introduced to Queensland Parliament in August 2025 and launched by the state government in the end of 2025.

=== Canada ===
Canada's National Sex Offender Registry (NSOR) came into force on 15 December 2004, with the passing of the Sex Offender Information Registration Act (SOIR Act). The public does not have access to the registry.

In 2026, the public High Risk Child Sex Offender Database was launched by the Royal Canadian Mounted Police. It acts as a centralized listing of offenders deemed to be of high risk and only contains information that has been previously released to the public by a police service, judicial court or government agency. This service is different from the full registry, which remains only accessible to law enforcement.

==== Ontario ====
Since 2001, the Province of Ontario operates its own sex offender registry concurrently with the federal registry. Unlike the federal registry which has an opt-out provision if an offender can convince a judge they are not a threat, the Ontario registry has no such provision. As a result, individuals who have been convicted of a designated offence at any time after 2001, and relocate to Ontario, are obligated to register for a period of at least 10 years. The registration period begins on the day the ex-offender relocates to Ontario. In 2025, Premier Doug Ford stated his intention to make parts of Ontario's registry accessible to the public.

=== China ===
Since 2019, China announced plans to build national database of sex offenders against minors and issued new guidelines for educators, those found sexually harassing students may face a lifetime ban from teaching. Minhang, Shanghai introduced its own sex offender registration system by 2020.

In 2021, China announced mandatory reporting system. Plans to create nationwide sex offender registry for schools and universities in China are currently under consideration.

=== India ===
India began its sex offender registry in September 2018. The registry is administered by the National Crime Records Bureau. Since its inception its reported to have over 450,000 people to begin with. It can be accessed only by law enforcement agencies and has names, addresses, photographs, fingerprints, DNA samples, and PAN and Aadhaar numbers of convicted sex offenders.

=== Ireland ===
Under the 2001 Sex Offenders Act and, Sex Offenders Amendment Act 2023, all those convicted of certain sexual offenses in Ireland are obliged to notify the Garda Síochána within 3 days their name and address. They must also notify the Garda of any changes to this information or if they intend to stay somewhere other than their registered address for more than 3 days (including if they are traveling abroad). Individuals are subject to these registration requirements for varying durations, based on a sliding scale of the severity of the sentence they received. This scale is as follows:

| Sentence | Notification period |
|---|---|
| Suspended or non-custodial | 5 years |
| 6 months or less | 7 years |
| 6 months to 2 years | 10 years |
| More than 2 years | Indefinitely |

=== South Korea ===
South Korea implemented sex offender registry system by 2000 and managed by the Ministry of Justice. In addition, South Korean government has also implemented more measures such as mandatory electronic monitoring for convicted child sex offenders and disclosure of their information upon release.

=== New Zealand ===
The New Zealand Government planned to introduce a sex offenders register by the end of 2014. It is managed by the New Zealand Police and information is shared between the police, Child, Youth and Family, the Department of Corrections, the Ministry of Social Development, and the Department of Building and Housing—government agencies which deal with child safety. Like the Australian and British registers, the New Zealand sex offenders register is not accessible to the general public but only to officials with security clearance. It also includes individuals who have been granted name suppression. This proposed register received support from both the Fifth National Government and the opposition Labour Party. However political lobby group the Sensible Sentencing Trust criticised the register for its lack of public access.

On 4 August 2014, the New Zealand Cabinet formally approved the establishment of a sex offenders register. According to the Minister of Police and Corrections Anne Tolley, Cabinet has agreed to allocate $35.5 million over the next ten years for the technology component of the register and initial ICT work is underway as of 14 August 2014. The sex offenders' register was expected to be operational by 2016 once enabling legislation ws passed and changes were made to the Corrections Act to enable information sharing. On 14 October 2016, the New Zealand Government formally established the Child Sex Offender Register (CSO Register) under the Child Protection (Child Sex Offender Government Agency Registration) Act 2016. The CSO Register is administrated by the police with the support of the Department of Corrections. The general public does not have access to the CSO Register. Only Police and Corrections personnel monitoring convicted child sex offenders have access to the database.

=== South Africa ===
The National Register for Sex Offenders was established in terms of the Criminal Law (Sexual Offences and Related Matters) Amendment Act, 2007. It records the details of anyone convicted of a sexual offence against a child or a mentally disabled person. The public does not have access to the registry; it is available to employers of people who work with children or mentally disabled people, to authorities responsible for licensing institutions that care for children or mentally disabled people, and to those responsible for approving foster care and adoptions. People listed on the register are prohibited from working with children or mentally disabled people, from managing institutions that care for children or mentally disabled people, and from being foster parents or adoptive parents.

=== Trinidad and Tobago ===
The Sexual Offences Act Chapter 11:28 Part III provides for Notification Requirements for Sex Offenders. This Sex Offenders Registry is only accessible to the Police Service and other branches of government. There are several gaps in this policy noted by members of the Caribbean Committee against Sex Crimes, most notably that the registry only deals with offenses committed within the Jurisdiction of Trinidad and Tobago. Persons who are registered Sex Offenders from other jurisdictions are not registered when they immigrate or are deported to Trinidad and Tobago.

On 13 September 2019, Trinidad and Tobago passed THE SEXUAL OFFENCES (AMENDMENT) BILL, 2019 which will allow the High Court discretion to sentence sex offenders to be placed on a public registry available on a website.

Section 48 of the amendment provides for public access to an online sex offenders registry, the court under section 49(4)c may make an order providing for a sex offender to be published on the website established in Section 48.

Trinidad and Tobago is now the smallest country in the world to adopt any form of Public Sex Offender Registration law.

=== United Kingdom ===
In the United Kingdom the Violent and Sex Offender Register (ViSOR) is a database of records of those required to register with the Police under the Sexual Offences Act 2003, those jailed for more than 12 months for violent offences, and unconvicted people thought to be at risk of offending. The Register is managed by the National Crime Agency and can be accessed by police, National Probation Service and HM Prison Service personnel.

=== United States ===
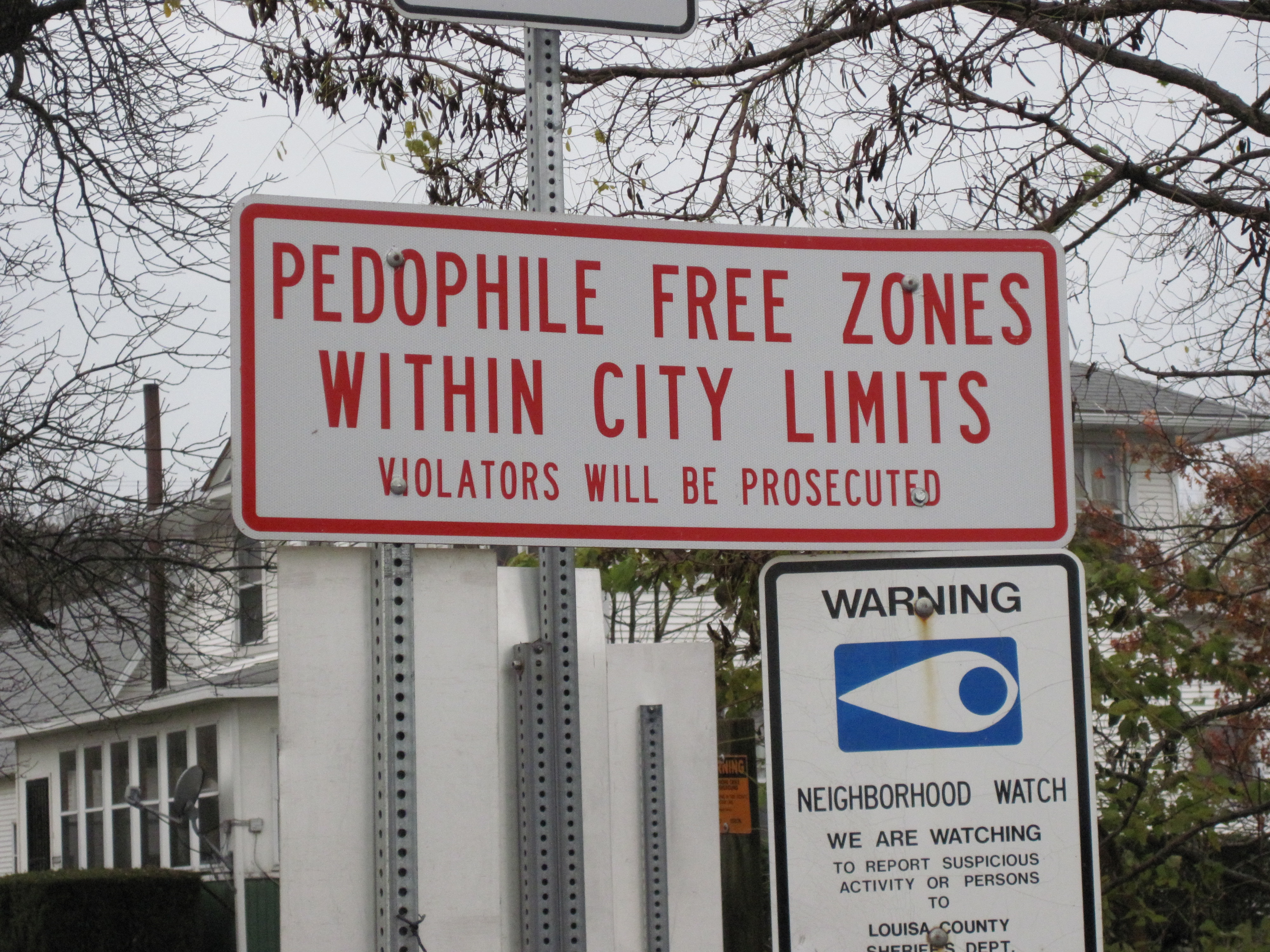
Sign at the limits of Wapello, Iowa; sex offender-free districts appeared as a result of Megan's Law.

In the U.S. federal system, persons registered are put into a tier program based on the offense they were convicted of. Risk-based systems have been proposed but not implemented. In the United States, the vast majority of the states apply offense-based registries, leaving the actual risk level of the offender and severity of the offense uncertain. The few U.S. states applying risk-based systems are pressured by the U.S. federal government to adopt offense-based systems in accordance with Adam Walsh Child Protection and Safety Act. Studies have shown that actuarial risk assessment instruments consistently outperform the offense-based system mandated by federal law. Consequently, the effectiveness of offense-based registries has been questioned by professionals, and there is evidence suggesting that such registries are counterproductive.

Some aspects of the current sex offender registries in the United States have been widely criticized by civil rights organizations Human Rights Watch and the ACLU, professional organizations Association for the Treatment of Sexual Abusers and Association of Criminal Defense Lawyers, reformist groups Reform Sex Offender Laws, Inc., Women Against Registry and USA FAIR, and by child safety advocate Patty Wetterling, the Chair of National Center for Missing & Exploited Children. There are virtually no studies finding U.S. registries effective, prompting some researchers to call them pointless, many even calling them counterproductive, arguing that they increase the rate of re-offense. In 2022, despite opposition from the Department of Justice, many states' attorneys-general, and NCMEC, the American Law Institute approved a revision to the Model Penal Code which included elimination of the registry for most offenses.

Sex offender registries in the United States consist of federal and state level systems designed to collect information of convicted sex offenders for law enforcement and public notification purposes. All 50 states and District of Columbia maintain registries that are open to public via sex offender registration websites, although some registered sex offenders are visible to law enforcement only. According to NCMEC, as of 2015 there were 843,260 registered sex offenders in the United States. Registrants have to periodically appear in person to their local law enforcement for purposes of collecting their personal information, such as photograph, fingerprints, name, scars, tattoos, living address, place of employment and vehicle information.

Information pertaining to names, addresses, physical description and vehicles are made public via official websites. In addition, registrants are often subject to restrictions that bar loitering, working or living within exclusion zones that sometimes cover entire cities and have forced registrants into encampments, such as the Julia Tuttle Causeway sex offender colony.

Anthropology professor Roger Lancaster has called the restrictions "tantamount to practices of banishment" that he deems disproportional, noting that registries include not just the "worst of the worst", but also "adults who supplied pornography to teenage minors; young schoolteachers who foolishly fell in love with one of their students; men who urinated in public, or were caught having sex in remote areas of public parks after dark." In many instances, individuals have pleaded guilty to an offense like urinating in public decades ago, not realizing the result would be their placement on a sex offender registry, and all of the restrictions that come with it.

Depending on jurisdiction, offenses requiring registration range in their severity from public urination or children and teenagers experimenting with their peers, to violent predatory sexual offenses. In some states non-sexual offenses such as unlawful imprisonment may require sex offender registration. According to Human Rights Watch, children as young as 9 have been placed on the registry for sexually experimenting with their peers. Juvenile convicts account for as much as 25 percent of the registrants. The federal Adam Walsh Act pressured states to register juveniles by tying federal funding to the degree to which state registries comply with the federal law's classification system for sex offenders.

States apply differing sets of criteria dictating which offenders are made visible to public. Some states scientifically evaluate the future risk of the offender and hide low-risk offenders from public. In other states, offenders are categorized according to the tier level related to statute of conviction. Duration of registration vary usually from 10 years to life depending on the state legislation and tier/risk category. Some states exclude low tier offenders from public registries while in others, all offenders are publicly listed. Some states offer possibility to petition to be removed from the registry under certain circumstances.

A majority of states apply systems based on conviction offenses only, where sex offender registration is mandatory if person pleads or is found guilty of violating any of the listed offenses. Under these systems, the sentencing judge does not sentence the convict into sex offender registry and cannot usually use judicial discretion to forgo registration requirement, even if they think the registration would be unreasonable, taking into account mitigating factors pertaining to individual cases. Instead, registration is a mandatory collateral consequence of criminal conviction. Due to this feature, laws target a wide range of behaviors and tend to treat all offenders the same. Civil right groups, law reform activists, academics, some child safety advocates, politicians and law enforcement officials think that current laws often target the wrong people, swaying attention away from high-risk sex offenders, while severely impacting lives of all registrants, and their families, attempting to re-integrate to society.

The Supreme Court of the United States has upheld sex offender registration laws twice, in two respects. Several challenges to some parts of state level sex offender laws have succeeded, however.

== Application to offenses other than felony sexual offenses ==
In the United States, sex offender registration has been applied to crimes other than rape, child molestation, and child pornography offenses and is sometimes applied to certain non-sexual offenses.

In Connecticut, those with state convictions for certain misdemeanors have to register, including public indecency in violation of C.G.S. § 53a-186, provided the court finds the victim was under 18, and sexual assault, fourth degree, in violation of C.G.S. § 53a-73a.

In New York and various other states, crimes that society does not necessarily view as sexual in nature are also considered to be registerable sex offenses, such as kidnapping, "sexual misconduct", unlawful imprisonment, and in some cases "sexually motivated offenses" (such as assault, burglary, etc.) that are not categorized as sexual offenses unless the court determines that the offense was committed pursuant to the offender's own sexual gratification. In New York specifically, kidnapping and unlawful imprisonment are registerable offenses only if the victim is under 17 and the offender is not a parent of the victim.

In Kentucky, all sex offenders who move into the state and are required to register in their previous home states are required to register with Kentucky for life, even if they were not required to register for life in their previous residence.

== Public disclosure of sex offender information ==
Currently, only the United States allows, and more often than not requires public disclosure of offender information, regardless of individual risk. Other countries do not make sex offender information public, unless the risk assessment has been conducted and the offender has been determined to pose a high risk of re-offending.

=== In the United States ===
In some localities in the United States, the lists of all sex offenders are made available to the public: for example, through the newspapers, community notification, or the Internet. However, in other localities, the complete lists are not available to the general public but are known to the police. In the United States offenders are often classified in three categories: Level (tier) I, Level II, and Level III offenders, information is usually accessible related to that level (information being more accessible to the public for higher level offenders). In some US jurisdictions, the level of offender is reflecting the evaluated recidivism risk of the individual offender, while in others, the level is designated merely by the virtue of conviction, without assessing the risk level posed by the offender.

In general, in states applying risk-based registry schemes, low-risk (Tier I) offenders are often excluded from the public disclosure. In some states only the highest risk (Tier III) offenders are subject to public disclosure, while some states also include moderate-risk (Tier II) offenders in public websites.

In SORNA compliant states, only Tier I registrants may be excluded from public disclosure, but since SORNA merely sets the minimum set of rules that states must follow, many SORNA compliant states have adopted stricter system and have opted to disclose information of all tiers. Some states have disclosed some of Tier I offenders, while in some states all Tier I offenders are excluded from public disclosure.

Just like states differ with respect to disclosure of information regarding different Tiers/Levels, they also differ with respect to classifying offenses into tiers. Thus, identical offenses committed in different states could produce very different outcomes in terms of public disclosure and registration period. Offense classified as Tier I offense in one state with no public disclosure, might be classified as Tier II or Tier III offense in another, leading to considerably longer registration period and public disclosure. These disparities in state legislation have caused unexpected problems to some registrants when moving from state to another, finding themselves subject to public disclosure on their destination state's sex offender website, and longer registration periods (sometimes for life), even though they originally were excluded from public registry and required to register for a shorter period.

Some states appear to apply "catch-all" statutes for former registrants moving into their jurisdiction, requiring registration and public posting of information, even when the person has completed their original registration period. At least one state (Illinois) reclassifies all registrants moving in the state into the highest possible tier (Sexual Predator), regardless of the original tier of the person, leading to a lifetime registration requirement and being publicly labelled as a "Sexual Predator". As noted previously, Kentucky requires lifetime registration for all currently registered individuals who move into the state.

Determining the tier level and whether or not a person would be subject to public disclosure, when relocating to another state, can be close to impossible without consulting an attorney or officials responsible for managing registration in the destination state, due to constantly changing laws and vagueness in some states legislative language.

While these disparities in level of public disclosure among different states might cause unexpected problems after registration, they have also caused some registrants to move into locations where public disclosure of lower level offenders is not permitted, in order to avoid public persecution and other adverse effects of public disclosure they were experiencing in their original location.

== Additional restrictions beyond public notice ==
Sex offenders on parole or probation in the United States are generally subject to the same restrictions as other parolees and probationers.

Sex offenders who have completed probation or parole may also be subject to restrictions above and beyond those of most felons. In some jurisdictions, they cannot live within a certain distance of places children or families gather. Such places are usually schools, worship centers, and parks, but could also include public venues (stadiums), airports, apartments, malls, major retail stores, college campuses, and certain neighborhoods (unless for essential business). In some U.S. states, they may also be barred from voting after a sentence has been completed and, at the federal level, barred from owning firearms, like all felons.

Some U.S. states have Civic Confinement laws, which allow very-high-risk sex offenders to be placed in secure facilities, "in many ways like prisons", where they are supposed to be offered treatment and regularly reevaluated for possible release. In practice, most states with Civil Commitment centers rarely release anyone. Texas has not released anyone in the 15 years since the program was started. In 2015, in response to a class action lawsuit, a Federal judge ruled Minnesota's Civil Commitment program to be unconstitutional, both for not providing effective treatment and for not fully releasing anyone since the program was started in 1994.

The U.S. state of Missouri now restricts the activities of registered sex offenders on Halloween, requiring them to avoid Halloween-related contact with children and remain at their registered home address from 5 p.m. to 10:30 p.m., unless they are required to work that evening. Regardless of whether they are at work, offenders must extinguish all outside residential lighting and post a sign stating, "No candy or treats at this residence".

In the United Kingdom, anyone convicted of any criminal offense cannot work in the legal, medical, teaching, or nursing professions. List 99 includes people convicted of sex offenses barred from working in education and social work, though it also includes people convicted of theft, fraud, corruption, assault, and drugs offenses.

Many social media platforms such as Facebook and Instagram prohibit convicted sex offenders from using their websites.

== Effectiveness and consequences ==
The vast majority of sexual offense victims are known to the offender—including friends, family, or other trusted adults such as teachers. This is contrary to media depictions of stranger danger, where strangers assault, molest, or kidnap people, particularly children, who are unknown to them. Thus, despite the public awareness of the whereabouts of convicted sex offenders, there has been little evidence to back the claim that mandatory registration has made society safer. According to ATSA, only in the states that utilize empirically derived risk assessment procedures and publicly identify only high risk offenders, has community notification demonstrated some effectiveness. The majority of U.S states do not utilize risk assessment tools when determining one's inclusion on the registry, although studies have shown that actuarial risk assessment instruments, which are created by putting together risk factors found by research to correlate with re-offending, consistently outperform the offense based systems.

Studies almost always show that residency restrictions increase offenders' recidivism rates by increasing offender homelessness and increasing instability in a sex offender's life. According to a Department of Justice study, 5.3% of sex offenders who were released from prison in 1994 were arrested for a new sex offense after 3 years. Robbers, arsonists and property crime committers (all of which have a recidivism rate of 60–70 percent after 3 years) were the most likely to re-offend group. Despite the public perception of sex offenders as having high recidivism, sex offenders had the second lowest recidivism rate, after only murderers, but sex offenders were about four times more likely than non-sex offenders to be arrested for a sexual offense after their discharge from prison. A later study done by the Department of Justice showed an even lower sex offender recidivism rate of about 2.1 percent after 3 years. In the late 2000s, a study showed that Indiana sex offenders have recidivism of about 1.03% after 3 years. Studies consistently show sex offender recidivism rates of 1–4% after 3 years, recidivism is usually at about 5–10% after a long follow up (such as a 10–25 year follow up).

A study by professors from Columbia University and the University of Michigan found that having police-only sex offender registries (e.g., Britain, Canada, Australia) significantly reduces sex offender recidivism, but making information about sex offenders publicly available significantly increases recidivism rates. This is because making sex offender information public increases offender stress and also makes the thought of returning to prison less threatening, as some sex offenders may feel returning to prison is not significantly worse than being on the public registry. Some sex offenders may come to view their central identity as being that of a sex offender due to the registry, and the more a sex offender views themselves as being a criminal the more likely they are to reoffend. However, the study also found that making sex offender registration publicly available may deter some potential first time sex offenders from committing an offense that would get them on the registry in the first place. The thought of getting on the sex offender registry may or may not deter non-sex offenders from committing sex crimes.

A 2008 study found no evidence that New York's registry or notification laws reduced sexual offenses by rapists, child molesters, sexual recidivists, or first-time sex offenders.

A study by University of Chicago graduate student Amanda Agan compared sex offender recidivism rates in states where sex offenders were required to register in 1994 with states where they were not required to register in 1994. The results of the study were that sex offender recidivism was, in fact, slightly lower in states where sex offenders were not required to register. This made Agan question whether creating sex offender registries was a rational idea. The study also showed that blocks in Washington DC where sex offenders lived did not have higher molestation rates than blocks where sex offenders did not live.

In at least two instances, convicted sex offenders were murdered after their information was made available over the Internet. The spouse, children and other family members of a sex offender often have negative consequences as a result of having a family member on the registry. For example, residency restrictions will make it harder for a sex offender's spouse and children, not just a sex offender themselves, to find housing. Residency restrictions may even cause a sex offender's family to be homeless. Sex offenders' spouses and children can also face harassment and financial hardship as a result of their loved one's sex offender status. More than half of the children of sex offenders say that fellow students treat them worse due to a parent's RSO status.

The Human Rights Watch organization criticized these laws in a 146-page report published in 2007, and in another report in 2013.

=== Registration and homelessness ===
People who are registered in offender databases are usually required to notify the government when they change their place of residence. This notification requirement is problematic in cases where the registered offender is homeless.

The state of Washington is among those that have special provisions in their registration code covering homeless offenders, but not all states have such provisions. A November 2006 Maryland Court of Appeals ruling exempts homeless persons from that state's registration requirements, which has prompted a drive to compose new laws covering this contingency.

News reports in 2007 revealed that some registered sex offenders were living outside or under the Julia Tuttle Causeway in Miami, Florida because Miami-Dade County ordinances, which are more restrictive than Florida's state laws, made it virtually impossible for them to find housing. The colony at the causeway grew to as many as 140 registrants living there as of July 2009, but eventually became a political embarrassment and was disbanded in April 2010, when the residents moved into acceptable housing in the area. However, many have lapsed back into homelessness, sleeping alongside railroad tracks.

As of 2013 Suffolk County, New York, which had imposed onerous restrictions on sex offenders exceeding those required by New York state law, was faced with a situation where 40 sex offenders were living in two cramped trailers located in isolated locations. This situation had been created by the county in 2007 as a solution to the problem of housing sex offenders.

=== Child perpetrators ===
In 2017, an Associated Press investigation found that for every adult-on-child offence, there are seven child-on-child sex offences. These crimes are rarely reported in the media or prosecuted since it is usually not noticed due to the lack of adult supervision. In cases where a child-on-child abuse has been reported the Child Advocacy Center (CAC) helps the victims with their recovery as well as educate the child so there is no further abuse. In 2019, the CAC reported that 20-25% of their cases were child-on-child abuse and with treatment 98% of them did not repeat it again.

However, in 2013, the Human Rights Watch conducted an investigation regarding the excessive punishments and death penalties of the United States where it was found that child perpetrators experience very harsh punishments, which according to the Adam Walsh Child Protection and Safety Act, jurisdictions are required to register juveniles convicted of sex offenses on a national, public online registry. In some jurisdictions, consenting teenage couples in possession of each other's nude photographs have also been charged with possessing child pornography and forced to register as sex offenders under mandatory sentencing requirements. For instance, according to the Michigan Penal Code (750.145c) the penalties for sexual activity or material applies to any person who knowingly possesses, distributes, promotes or finances any child sexually abusive material, as well, as anyone who persuades, coerces, or knowingly allows a child (person less than 18 years of age) to participate in sexually abusive activity with intention to make child pornography, this includes the person sending the nude photograph, as well as the person receiving them.

== See also ==
- Circles of Support and Accountability
- Sarah's Law
- United States Marshals Service
- United States Center for SafeSport
- NARSOL
- Alliance for Constitutional Sex Offense Laws
