= Movement to reform sex offender laws in the United States =

The movement to reform sex offender laws in the United States describes the efforts of individuals and organizations to change state laws requiring sex offender registries in the United States.

Proposed reforms fall into two broad categories: advocacy for reform of statutory rape laws that may require a teenager to register as a sex offender for sexting or consensual sexual acts involving another teen, on the one hand, and broader efforts to modify sex offender registration laws based upon what advocates see as disproportionate impact on the lives of convicted offenders compared to the public benefits derived, on the other.

== Arguments ==
A number of arguments have been raised in support of the idea that reform is needed. For example, indiscriminate placement of offenders in the sex offender registry may undermine their ability to rehabilitate because of social stigma and other hardships related to sex offender registration. Broad sex offender registration requirements may also disproportionately affect younger offenders particularly when applied to crimes such as sexting or consensual underage sex.

Academics have also noted a lack of good research showing these laws actually prevent sex crimes. On the one hand, sex crimes tend to be perpetrated by a small number of repeat offenders, making it hard to draw conclusions about the effect of these laws on recidivism for most offenders. A 2011 study looking at crime records concluded that while registries themselves may reduce recidivism rates, publication of those registries does not appear to have a similar effect.

Proposals include making registries available for law enforcement only, and empowering officials to use greater judgment in determining who should be required to register. They point to collateral consequences of sex offender registration, such as social stigma, unemployment, homelessness and vigilante attacks, which may extend also to the families of registrants.

Particular criticism has been leveled at the decisions of the U.S. Supreme Court. Law professor Catherine Carpenter, and Amy E. Beverlin, a J.D. candidate, wrote in 2012 that sex offender registration laws, initially grounded in rational bases, spiraled into what they characterized as "super-registration schemes". They argued that, even if initial registration schemes were constitutional, they grew into something that was unconstitutionally punitive. The article posits that U.S. Supreme Court decisions in Smith v. Doe and Connecticut Dept. of Public Safety v. Doe upholding the registration schemes as civil regulations led to runaway legislation that has become "unmoored from its initial constitutional grounding" By leaving such schemes immune to substantive due process and procedural due process requirements normally associated with criminal laws, they argue, legislators were left free "to draft increasingly harsh registration and notification schemes to please an electorate that subsists on a steady diet of fear".

Proponents of sex offender registries argue that registration requirements have real utility because, among other things, sex offenders are likely to re-offend and registration can assist police in locating re-offenders. Reform opponents have also argued that opposition to registration is based on the assumption that to be effective, measures must work every time, thus undervaluing small reductions. They also claim there is evidence registries do reduce sex crime.

== Activism ==
The reform effort involves more than 50 state level organizations, with at least one group operating in each state. The National Association for Rational Sexual Offense Laws (RSOL) arranges yearly national conferences to discuss sex offender legislation, and makes its presence known at conferences of the National Association of Criminal Defense Lawyers. Their annual meetings can be controversial, including criticism of a welcome letter sent by the mayor of Houston, Texas to the organizers of the 2023 meeting "applaud[ing] its restorative justice efforts on behalf of marginalized citizens." The mayor's office subsequently distanced itself from the letter.

RSOL state affiliates have challenged ordinances governing sex offenders in federal court. During 2014 over 20 municipalities in California were sued by RSOL. Their efforts in California culminated, in March 2015, when Supreme Court of California declared residency restrictions unconstitutional citing their unfairness and counterproductive effects. Similar lawsuits by the activists have forced some Texas towns to ease their residency restrictions. Other efforts include peaceful demonstrations, challenging the laws in courts and educating the public and legislators about facts of sexual offending and the consequences of current legislation.

Human Rights Watch has also advocated for reforms, as has the ACLU. and some of its state-level affiliates, and some child safety advocates, some of whom argue for restrictions on who may be placed upon a list of registered sex offenders, and when the public should have access to sex offender registries.

In April 2015 Women Against Registry announced that it has begun gathering information and participants for two class action lawsuits to be filed in United States federal court. One of the lawsuits is intended to be on behalf of registered sex offenders, and the second on behalf of families of registered sex offenders. In 2016 Alliance for Constitutional Sex Offense Laws sued the government for the unique identifier planned to be printed on passports of some registrants.

== See also ==
- Alliance for Constitutional Sex Offense Laws
- Florida Action Committee
- National Association for Rational Sexual Offense Laws
- Illinois Voices for Reform
- Women Against Registry
- Nebraskans Unafraid
