= Sex offender registries in the United States =

In the United States, sex offender registries exist at both the federal and state levels. The federal registry is known as the National Sex Offender Public Website (NSOPW) and integrates data in all state, territorial, and tribal registries provided by offenders required to register. Registries contain information about persons convicted of sexual offenses for law enforcement and public notification purposes. All 50 states and the District of Columbia maintain sex offender registries that are open to the public via websites; most information on offenders is visible to the public. Public disclosure of offender information varies between the states depending on offenders' designated tier, which may also vary from state to state, or risk assessment result. According to NCMEC, as of 2016 there were 861,837 registered sex offenders in United States.

The majority of states and the federal government apply systems based on conviction offenses only, where registration requirement is triggered as a consequence of finding of guilt, or pleading guilty, to a sex offense regardless of the actual gravity of the crime. The trial judge typically can not exercise judicial discretion concerning registration. Depending on jurisdiction, offenses requiring registration range in their severity from public urination or adolescent sexual experimentation with peers, to violent sex offenses. In some states offenses such as unlawful imprisonment may require sex offender registration. According to Human Rights Watch, children as young as 9 have been placed on the registry; juvenile offenders account for 25 percent of registrants. In some states, the length of the registration period is determined by the offense or assessed risk level; in others all registration is for life. Some states allow removal from the registry under certain specific, limited circumstances. Information of juvenile offenders is withheld for law enforcement but may be made public after their 18th birthday.

Sex Offender Registration and Notification (SORN) has been studied for its impact on the rates of sexual offense recidivism, with the majority of studies demonstrating no impact. The Supreme Court of the United States has upheld sex offender registration laws both times such laws have been examined by them. Several challenges on parts of state level legislation have been honored by the courts. Legal scholars have challenged the rationale behind the Supreme Court rulings. Civil rights organizations such as NARSOL, ACSOL and ACLU promote reform of the legislation.

== History ==
In 1947, California became the first state in the United States to have a sex offender registration program. C. Don Field was prompted by the Black Dahlia murder case to introduce a bill calling for the formation of a sex offender registry; California became the first U.S. state to make this mandatory. In 1990, Washington state began community notification of its most dangerous sex offenders, making it the first state to ever make any sex offender information publicly available. Prior to 1994, only a few states required convicted sex offenders to register their addresses with local law enforcement. The 1990s saw the emergence of several cases of brutal violent sexual offenses against children. Crimes like those of Westley Allan Dodd, Earl Kenneth Shriner and Jesse Timmendequas were highly publicized. As a result, public policies began to focus on protecting public from stranger danger. Since the early 1990s, several state and federal laws, often named after victims, have been enacted as a response to public outrage generated by highly publicized, but statistically very rare, violent predatory sex crimes against children by strangers.

=== Jacob Wetterling Act of 1994 ===
In 1989, 11-year-old Jacob Wetterling was abducted from a street in St. Joseph, Minnesota. His fate was unknown until 2016 when his remains were discovered just outside Paynesville, Minnesota some 30 miles from where he was taken. Jacob's mother, Patty Wetterling, current chair of National Center for Missing and Exploited Children, led a community effort to implement a sex offender registration requirement in Minnesota and, subsequently, nationally.

In 1994, Congress passed the Jacob Wetterling Crimes Against Children and Sexually Violent Offender Registration Act. If states failed to comply, the states would forfeit 10% of federal funds from the Omnibus Crime Control and Safe Streets Act. The act required each state to create a registry of offenders convicted of qualifying sex offenses and certain other offenses against children and to track offenders by confirming their place of residence annually for ten years after their release into the community or quarterly for the rest of their lives if the sex offender was convicted of a violent sex crime. States had a certain time period to enact the legislation, along with guidelines established by the Attorney General. The registration information collected was treated as private data viewable by law enforcement personnel only, although law enforcement agencies were allowed to release relevant information that was deemed necessary to protect the public concerning a specific person required to register.

Another high-profile case, abuse and murder of Megan Kanka led to modification of Jacob Wetterling Act. The subsequent laws forcing changes to the sex offenders registries in all 50 states have since troubled Patty Wetterling and she has been vocal about her opposition to including children on the registry as well as allowing full access to the public. In an interview with reporter Madeleine Baran, Wetterling stated, "No more victims, that's the goal. But we let our emotions run away from achieving that goal." In lamenting how we treat sex offenders she stated, "You're screwed. You will not get a job, you will not find housing. This is on your record forever, good luck." She believes that by not allowing sex offenders who have served their time to reintegrate to society we do more harm than good. "I've turned 180 from where I was."

=== Megan's Law of 1996 ===
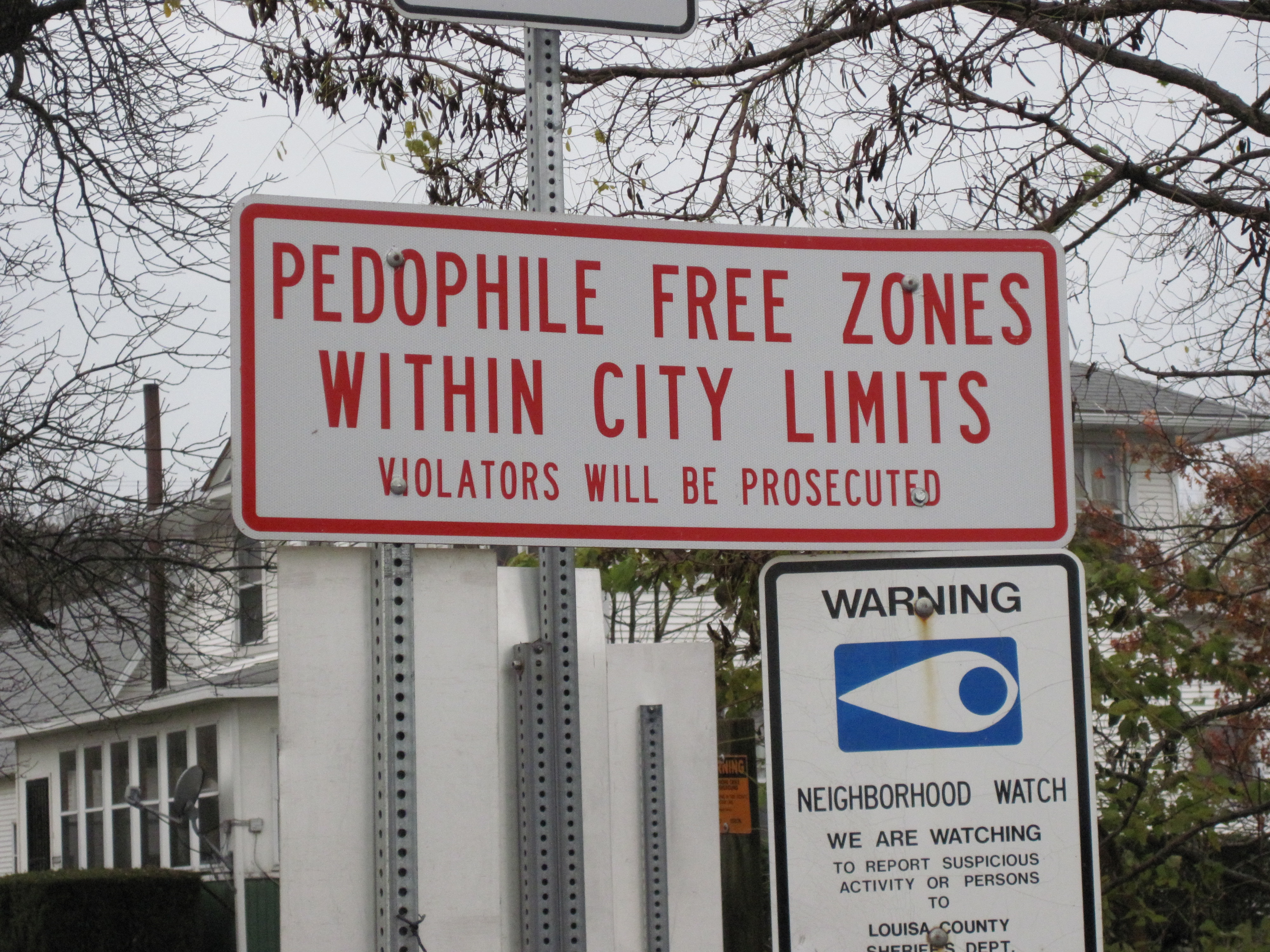
Sign at the limits of Wapello, Iowa; sex offender-free districts appeared as a result of Megan's Law.

In 1994, 7-year-old Megan Kanka from Hamilton Township, Mercer County, New Jersey was raped and killed by a recidivist sex offender. Jesse Timmendequas, who had been convicted of two previous sex crimes against children, lured Megan in his house and raped and killed her. Megan's mother, Maureen Kanka, started to lobby to change the laws, arguing that registration established by the Wetterling Act was insufficient for community protection. Maureen Kanka's goal was to mandate community notification, which under the Wetterling Act had been at the discretion of law enforcement. She said that if she had known that a sex offender lived across the street, Megan would still be alive. In 1994, New Jersey enacted Megan's Law. In 1996, President Bill Clinton enacted a federal version of Megan's Law, as an amendment to the Jacob Wetterling Act. The amendment required all states to implement Registration and Community Notification Laws by the end of 1997. Prior to Megan's death, only 5 states had laws requiring sex offenders to register their personal information with law enforcement. On August 5, 1996 Massachusetts was the last state to enact its version of Megan's Law.

=== Amber Hagerman Child Protection Act Law of 1996 ===
President Bill Clinton signed the Amber Hagerman Child Protection Act Law into law in October 1996, creating the Amber alert system and the national sex offender registry.

=== Adam Walsh Act of 2006 ===
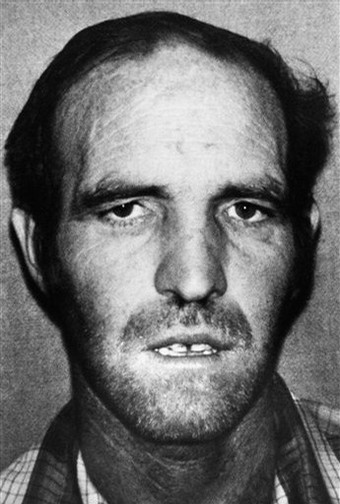
Ottis Toole, suspected of killing Adam Walsh but never convicted.

The most comprehensive legislation related to the supervision and management of sex offenders is the Adam Walsh Act (AWA), named after Adam Walsh. In 1981, the six-year-old Walsh was kidnapped from a Florida shopping mall. His remains were discovered two weeks later, and Ottis Toole was suspected but never charged or convicted of the crime. The AWA was signed on the 25th anniversary of his abduction. Efforts to establish a national registry were led by John Walsh, Adam's father.

One of the significant components of the AWA is the Sex Offender Registration and Notification Act (SORNA). SORNA provides uniform minimum guidelines for registration of sex offenders, regardless of the state they live in. SORNA requires states to widen the number of covered offenses and to include certain classes of juvenile offenders. Prior to SORNA, states were granted latitude in the methods to differentiate offender management levels. Whereas many states had adopted to use structured risk assessment tools classification to distinguish potential "high risk" from "low risk" individuals, SORNA mandates such distinctions to be made solely on the basis of the governing offense.

States are allowed, and often do, exceed the minimum requirements. Scholars have raised cautions about the classification system required under Adam Walsh Act being possibly less sophisticated than risk-based approach previously adopted in certain states.

Extension in number of covered offenses and making the amendments apply retroactively under SORNA requirements expanded the registries by as much as 500% in some states. All states were required to comply with SORNA minimum guidelines by July 2009 or risk losing 10% of their funding through the Byrne program. As of April 2014, the Justice Department reported only 17 states, three territories and 63 tribes had substantially implemented requirements of the Adam Walsh Act.

== Registration ==
Sex offenders must periodically report in person to their local law enforcement agency and furnish their address, and list of other information such as place of employment and email addresses. The offenders are photographed and fingerprinted by law enforcement, and in some cases DNA information is also collected. Registration period depends on the classification level and the law of the governing jurisdiction.

== Classification of offenders ==
States apply varied methods of classifying registrants. Identical offenses committed in different states may produce different outcomes in terms of public disclosure and registration period. An offender classified as level/tier I offender in one state, with no public notification requirement, might be classified as tier II or tier III offender in another. Sources of variation are diverse, but may be viewed over three dimensions — how classes of registrants are distinguished from one another, the criteria used in the classification process, and the processes applied in classification decisions.

The first point of divergence is how states distinguish their registrants. At one end are the states operating single-tier systems that treat registrants equally with respect to reporting, registration duration, notification, and related factors. Alternatively, some states use multi-tier systems, usually with two or three categories that are supposed to reflect presumed public safety risk and, in turn, required levels of attention from law enforcement and the public. Depending on state, registration and notification systems may have special provisions for juveniles, habitual offenders or those deemed "sexual predators" by virtue of certain standards.

The second dimension is the criteria employed in the classification decision. States running offense-based systems use the conviction offense or the number of prior offenses as the criteria for tier assignment. Other jurisdictions utilize various risk assessments that consider factors that scientific research has linked to sexual recidivism risk, such as age, number of prior sex offenses, victim gender, relationship to the victim, and indicators of psychopathy and deviant sexual arousal. Finally, some states use a hybrid of offense-based and risk-assessment-based systems for classification. For example, Colorado law requires minimum terms of registration based on the conviction offense for which the registrant was convicted or adjudicated but also uses a risk assessment for identifying sexually violent predators — a limited population deemed to be dangerous and subject to more extensive requirements.

Third, states distinguishing among registrants use differing systems and processes in establishing tier designations. In general, offense-based classification systems are used for their simplicity and uniformity. They allow classification decisions to be made via administrative or judicial processes. Risk-assessment-based systems, which employ actuarial risk assessment instruments and in some cases clinical assessments, require more of personnel involvement in the process. Some states, like Massachusetts and Colorado, utilize multidisciplinary review boards or judicial discretion to establish registrant tiers or sexual predator status.

In some states, such as Kentucky, Florida, and Illinois, all sex offenders who move into the state and are required to register in their previous home states are required to register for life, regardless of their registration period in previous residence. Illinois reclassifies all registrants moving in as a "Sexual Predator".

== Public notification ==
States apply differing sets of criteria to determine which registration information is available to the public. In a few states, a judge determines the risk level of the offender, or scientific risk assessment tools are used; information on low-risk offenders may be available to law enforcement only. In other states, all sex offenders are treated equally, and all registration information is available to the public on a state Internet site. Information of juvenile offenders are withheld for law enforcement but may be made public after their 18th birthday.

Under federal SORNA, only tier I registrants may be excluded from public disclosure, with exemption of those convicted of "specified offense against a minor." Since SORNA merely sets the minimum set of rules the states must follow, many SORNA compliant states have opted to disclose information of all tiers.

Disparities in state legislation have caused some registrants moving across state lines becoming subject to public disclosure and longer registration periods under the destination state's laws. These disparities have also prompted some registrants to move from one state to another in order to avoid stricter rules of their original state.

== Exclusion zones ==
External image
- City wide map of exclusion zones in Milwaukee prior to September 23, 2017. Red and orange highlights denoted the areas where certain registered sex offenders could not reside within the city

Laws restricting where registered sex offenders may live or work have become increasingly common since 2005. At least 30 states have enacted statewide residency restrictions prohibiting registrants from living within certain distances of schools, parks, day-cares, school bus stops, or other places where children may congregate. Distance requirements range from 500 to 2,500 feet (150 to 760 m), but most start at least 1,000 ft (300 m) from designated boundaries. In addition, hundreds of counties and municipalities have passed local ordinances exceeding the state requirements, and some local communities have created exclusion zones around churches, pet stores, movie theaters, libraries, playgrounds, tourist attractions or other "recreational facilities" such as stadiums, airports, auditoriums, swimming pools, skating rinks and gymnasiums, regardless of whether publicly or privately owned. Although restrictions are usually tied to distances from areas where children congregate, most states also apply exclusion zones to offenders whose crimes did not involve children. In a 2007 report, Human Rights Watch identified only four states limiting restrictions to those convicted of sex crimes involving minors. The report also found that laws preclude registrants from homeless shelters within restriction areas. In 2005, some localities in Florida banned sex offenders from public hurricane shelters during the 2005 Atlantic hurricane season. In 2007, Tampa, Florida's city council considered banning registrants from moving in the city.

Restrictions may effectively cover entire cities, leaving only small areas where affected convicts can live. Residency restrictions in California in 2006 covered more than 97% of rental housing area in San Diego County. In an attempt to banish registrants from living in communities, some localities have built small "pocket parks" intended to drive registrants out of the area. In 2007, journalists reported that registered sex offenders were living under the Julia Tuttle Causeway in Miami, Florida because the state laws and Miami-Dade County ordinances banned them from living elsewhere. Encampment of 140 registrants is known as Julia Tuttle Causeway sex offender colony. The colony generated international coverage and criticism around the country. The colony was disbanded in 2010 when the city found acceptable housing in the area for the registrants, but reports five years later indicated that some registrants were still living on streets or alongside railroad tracks. As of 2013 Suffolk County, New York, was faced with a situation where 40 sex offenders were living in two cramped trailers, which were regularly moved to new locations depending on changing restrictions.

== Effectiveness ==
Evidence to support the effectiveness of public sex offender registries is limited and mixed. Majority of research results do not find statistically significant shift in sexual offense trends following the implementation of sex offender registration and notification (SORN) regimes. A few studies indicate that sexual recidivism may have been lowered by SORN policies, while a few have found statistically significant increase in sex crimes following SORN implementation. According to the Office of Justice Programs' SMART Office, sex offender registration and notification requirements arguably have been implemented in the absence of empirical evidence regarding their effectiveness.

According to SMART Office, there is no empirical support for the effectiveness of residence restrictions. In fact, a number of negative unintended consequences have been empirically identified that may aggravate rather than mitigate offender risk.

== Debate ==
According to a 2007 study, the majority of the general public perceives sex offender recidivism to be very high and views offenders as a homogeneous group regarding that risk. Consequently, the study found that a majority of the public endorses broad community notification and related policies. Proponents of the public registries and residency restrictions believe them to be useful tools to protect themselves and their children from sexual victimization.

Critics of the laws point to the lack of evidence to support the effectiveness of sex offender registration policies. They call the laws too harsh and unfair for adversely affecting the lives of registrants decades after completing their initial sentence, and for affecting their families as well. Critics say that registries are overly broad as they reach to non-violent offenses, such as sexting or consensual teen sex, and fail to distinguish those who are not a danger to society from predatory offenders.

Former Supervisory Special Agent of the FBI Kenneth V. Lanning argues that registration should be offender-based instead of offense-based: "A sex-offender registry that does not distinguish between the total pattern of behavior of a 50-year-old man who violently raped a 6-year-old girl and an 18-year-old boy who had 'compliant' sexual intercourse with his girlfriend a few weeks prior to her 16th birthday is misguided. The offense an offender is technically found or pleads guilty to may not truly reflect his dangerousness and risk level".

Some lawmakers recognize problems in the laws. However, they are reluctant to aim for reforms because of political opposition and being viewed as lessening the child safety laws.

These perceived problems in legislation have prompted a growing grass-roots movement to reform sex offender laws in the United States.

== Constitutionality ==
Sex offender registration and community notification laws have been challenged on a number of constitutional and other bases, generating a substantial amount of case law. Those challenging the statutes have claimed violations of ex post facto, due process, cruel and unusual punishment, equal protection and search and seizure. The Supreme Court of the United States has upheld the laws. In 2002, in Connecticut Dept. of Public Safety v. Doe the U.S. Supreme Court affirmed public disclosure of sex offender information. In 2003, in Smith v. Doe, the Supreme Court upheld Alaska's registration statute, reasoning that sex offender registration is a civil measure reasonably designed to protect public safety, not a punishment, which can be applied ex post facto. However, law scholars argue that even if the registration schemes were initially constitutional they have, in their current form, become unconstitutionally burdensome and unmoored from their constitutional grounds. A study published in the fall of 2015 found that statistics cited by Justice Anthony Kennedy in two U.S. Supreme Court cases commonly cited in decisions upholding the constitutionality of sex offender policies were unfounded. Several challenges to state level sex offender laws have been honored after hearing at the state level. However, in 2017 the Pennsylvania Supreme Court determined that SORNA violates ex post facto when retroactively applied.

In September 2017 a federal judge found that the Colorado registry is unconstitutional under the cruel and unusual punishment clause of the United States Constitution as applied to three plaintiffs.

== Impact on registrants and their families ==
Sex offender registration and community notification (SORN) laws carry costs in the form of collateral consequences for both sex offenders and their families, including difficulties in relationships and maintaining employment, public recognition, harassment, attacks, difficulties finding and maintaining suitable housing, as well as an inability to take part in expected parental duties, such as going to school functions. Negative effects of collateral consequences on offenders are expected to contribute to known risk factors, and to offenders failing to register, and to the related potential for re-offending.

Family members of sex offenders often experience isolation, hopelessness and depression. U.S. federal law prohibits anyone who is required to register as a sex offender for life in any state from participating in the Housing Choice Voucher Program (Section 8) or any similar federal housing programs, such as public housing.

== See also ==
- American sex offenders
- Child sexual abuse
- Circles of Support and Accountability
- Miracle Village
- Pervert Park
- Sarah's Law
- United States Center for SafeSport
