= 2006 California Proposition 83 =

Proposition 83 of 2006 (also known as the Sexual Predator Punishment and Control Act: Jessica's Law or simply, Jessica's Law) was a statute enacted by 70% of California voters on November 7, 2006, authored by State Senator George Runner (R-Antelope Valley) and State Assemblywoman Sharon Runner (R-Antelope Valley). It was proposed by means of the initiative process as a version of the Jessica's Law proposals that had been considered in other states.

== Provisions ==
The Act was a lengthy and complex measure that made many changes to the California Penal Code and the Welfare and Institutions Code. Its provisions increased the penalties for sex offenders, broadened the definition of certain sexual offenses, eliminated good time credits for early release of certain offenders, prohibited probation for certain crimes, extended parole for some offenses, increased court-imposed fees on sex offenders and provided for lifelong GPS monitoring of high risk sex offenders. The law also barred convicted sex offenders from living within 2,000 feet of a school or any place where children gather—effectively blocking them from living in the vast majority of the areas of large California cities, until the provision was found unconstitutional by Supreme Court of California in March 2015. Under the law, a sex offender with a minimum of one victim and any previous criminal history may be civilly committed for an indefinite period.

== Initiative campaign ==
The law was sponsored by husband and wife legislators State Senator George Runner (R-Antelope Valley) and State Assemblywoman Sharon Runner (R-Antelope Valley). It was supported by Governor Schwarzenegger and law enforcement throughout the state. California Attorneys for Criminal Justice (a criminal defense attorneys association) opposed Proposition 83 and wrote the opposing argument for the voter pamphlet. They argued the restrictions would cause problems with finding a place of residence for freed convicts.

== Result of vote ==
Proposition 83
Choice	Votes	%
For	5,926,800	70.47
Against	2,483,597	29.53
Total	8,410,397	100.00

Proposition 83 results by county Yes: 80–90%; 70–80%; 60–70%; 50–60%; No: 50–60%

== Enforcement ==
In November 2006, enforcement of the new law was initially blocked in four counties by U.S. District Judge Susan Illston who ruled in a lawsuit filed by an existing offender based on its retroactive nature. However, three months later, U.S. District Judge Jeffrey White dismissed that lawsuit. In 2010, the Supreme Court of California ruled that the residency requirements of Jessica's Law could be applied retroactively. On September 12, 2012, a state appeals court blocked enforcement of the residency requirements of Jessica's Law for all paroled sex offenders in San Diego County, affirming a lower court ruling, stating that it was an unconstitutional blanket condition of parole that "limits the housing choices of all sex offenders identically, without regard to the type of victim or the risk of reoffending." During 2014 RSOL's Californian chapter CA RSOL sued over 20 municipalities in federal court over sex offender ordinances causing at least 44 other municipalities to either repeal or quit enforcing their ordinances in order to avoid litigation. In March 2015 Supreme Court of California deemed blanket residency restrictions unconstitutional citing their counterproductive effect and unfairness.

The California Department of Corrections and Rehabilitation (CDCR) has stated that every registered sex offender paroled after the law's enactment in 2006 is wearing a GPS device. However, CDCR is responsible for only 11% of California's sex offenders statewide, and "only a fraction of the state's registered sex offenders wear a GPS unit".
