= National Association for Rational Sexual Offense Laws =

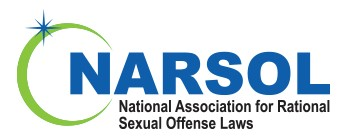
- Abbreviation: NARSOL
- Formation: 2007
- Founded at: Boston, Massachusetts
- Type: Non-profit corporation
- Purpose: Civil rights advocacy, Reforming sex offender registry laws
- Headquarters: Raleigh, North Carolina
- Chair: Robin Vander Wall
- Executive Director: Brenda Jones
- Website: https://narsol.org
- Formerly called: RSOL, Reform Sex Offender Laws

The National Association for Rational Sexual Offense Laws (NARSOL) is an organization headquartered in Raleigh, North Carolina with operations based in Albuquerque, New Mexico and with affiliated organizations, advocates, and contacts in the vast majority of states. NARSOL and its affiliates are part of a movement to reform sexual offense laws in the United States. NARSOL has generated media attention by arranging national conferences in multiple cities including Boston, Albuquerque, Los Angeles, Dallas, Atlanta, Cleveland, Houston, and Raleigh, and by being involved in numerous lawsuits challenging the constitutionality of sex offender registration and notification laws.

== Positions ==
While NARSOL believes that offenders should be held accountable in court of law, it criticizes current sex offender registry laws in the United States. NARSOL asserts that current sex offender laws are not based on scientific evidence. Organizations such as Association for the Treatment of Sexual Abusers have presented similar critiques.

NARSOL asserts that while sex offender registries in the United States were originally well-intentioned and only meant for the most dangerous sex offenders, their reach has widened over time to include other offenses such as teen sexting and consensual relations between young people. Among other assertions, they also argue that sex offender registry requirements are unconstitutional when they are extended beyond an individual's sentence.

== Support Assistance ==
NARSOL is an advocacy organization, not a support organization. Additionally, NARSOL is not a legal organization and is unable to provide legal advice or help with individual legal cases or issues. NARSOL encourages the development of Fearless Groups, which are dynamic self-sustaining support groups.

NARSOL publishes a newsletter called the Digest.

NARSOL also has a number of other online resources such as "NARSOL in Action" which is a YouTube Podcast series with updates about national litigation, and "Resources" which is an online reference site for legal counsel, news and events, educational resources, employment resources, financial resources and other support groups.

== Lawsuits ==
NARSOL's former Californian chapter, CA RSOL, challenged ordinances governing registered sex offenders in federal court across the state of California. During 2014 over 20 municipalities were sued by CA RSOL. As of October 11, 15 of the lawsuits had been settled, 38 cities had avoided litigation by revoking their sex offender ordinances, and 6 cities had chosen to discontinue enforcing the ordinances. At the time, sex offender ordinances were under review in 18 additional cities. These efforts culminated in March 2015 when Supreme Court of California declared residency restrictions unconstitutional citing their unfairness and counterproductive effects. Similar lawsuits by the RSOL's Texas chapter forced some Texas towns to ease their residency restrictions in early 2016.

NARSOL's Maryland chapter, FAIR (Families Advocating Intelligent Registries) has played a significant role in reversing the retroactive application of registry laws in the state of Maryland. They were part of the Amicus Curiae cited in the March 2013 Court of Appeals decision Doe v. DPSCS which declared that Maryland's existing sex offender registry laws are punitive in effect, and therefore could not constitutionally be applied retroactively to persons whose crimes pre-dated registration. This decision was further solidified in 2014 with the "Doe 2" decision.

== Affiliated organizations ==
- Alliance for Constitutional Sex Offense Laws
- Arizonans for Rational Sex Offense Laws
- Arkansas Time After Time
- Coalition for Sexual Offense Restoration
- CT for One Standard of Justice
- Delaware Advocates for the Reform of Sexual Offense Laws
- Florida Action Committee
- Illinois Voices for Reform
- Indiana Voices aka Indiana RSOL
- Iowans Unafraid
- Maryland Families Advocating Intelligent Registries
- Michigan Citizens for Justice
- Minnesota for Our Rights
- North Carolina RSOL
- Ohio RSOL
- Oklahoma for Rational Sexual Offense Laws
- Oklahoma Voices
- Oregon Voices
- Pennsylvania Association for Rational Sex Offense Laws
- Restore Georgia Coalition
- South Carolinians for Rational Sex Offense Laws
- Texas Voices for Reason and Justice
- Safer Virginia
- West Virginians for Rational Sexual Offense Laws

== See also ==
- Women Against Registry
- Constitutionality of sex offender registries in the United States
- Effectiveness of sex offender registration policies in the United States
- List of criminal justice reform organizations in the United States
- Sex offender registry
