= Counterproductive =

Counterproductive is anything that is more of an "obstacle" than a help in the achieving of a productive project or an objective.

- Counterproductive norms: A situation that prevents a group, organization, or other collective entities from performing or accomplishing its originally stated function.
- Counterproductive work behavior: Employee behavior that goes against the goals of an organization.
