= Illinois Voices for Reform =

Illinois Voices for Reform, Inc.
- Formation: 2009
- Type: Non-profit organization
- Headquarters: Dekalb, Illinois
- Founder: Tonia Maloney
- Executive Director: Will Mingus
- Website: www.ilvoices.com

Illinois Voices for Reform is a non-profit advocacy and support organization for Illinois sex offenders and their families. Founded in 2010, it is dedicated to providing education on issues affecting sex offenders to the public and to legislators. Illinois Voices for Reform is an affiliate organization of the National Association for Rational Sexual Offense Laws (NARSOL), and is one of the more than 50 organizations nationwide movement to reform sex offender laws in the United States.

== Advocacy ==
Illinois Voices for Reform says that current laws unfairly stigmatize young and low-risk offenders, such as those engaging in consensual teenage sex or sexting. They believe that laws should be based on research and empirical evidence of what works, and that "feel good" laws based on public hysteria surrounding high-profile, but rare cases waste taxpayer dollars, violate the rights of individuals, and can actually undermine public safety. The group has voiced its concern over laws that do not differentiate between violent and non-violent offenders to Illinois General Assembly. Accordingly, the group heavily objected to Illinois adopting the federal Adam Walsh Act. Recently, Illinois Voices for Justice has opposed a sex offender workplace registry bill that was introduced in the Illinois Senate in March 2015. They have also spoken out about police staff shortages that can make it difficult to comply with registration requirements.

== See also ==
- Alliance for Constitutional Sex Offense Laws
- Women Against Registry
