= Women Against Registry =

American non-profit organization

- Type: Non-profit organization
- Headquarters: Arnold, Missouri
- President: Meaghan Ybos
- Website: womenagainstregistry.org

Women Against Registry (W.A.R.) is a U.S. non-profit organization, based in Arnold, Missouri, which works to obtain changes in laws affecting sex offenders. Most W.A.R. members are mothers, wives, girlfriends, and other family members of persons convicted of a sexual offense. W.A.R. advocates the abolition of sex offender registries altogether, but also wants officials to be more judicious in deciding who poses a risk, instead of the current policies applied to all offenders indiscriminately.

== Purpose ==
The organization is focused on fostering awareness of the collateral damage suffered by the families of registrants. It asserts that while there is no evidence to support the effectiveness of public sex offender registries in deterring sexual crime, the registrants, their children, spouses, and other family members, numbering in the hundreds of thousands, suffer daily harassment, social exclusion, depression, anxiety, and even vigilante attacks; this contributes to the destruction of families. W.A.R. opposes current mandatory laws governing sex offender registration and monitoring, which take away judicial discretion of courts as to whether an offender must register. W.A.R. believes that monitoring should happen only when found appropriate by a judge as part of the sentencing process.

W.A.R. aims to educate lawmakers and society about the discrimination that family members of registered offenders face, through press releases, peaceful demonstrations, and attending the National Conference of State Legislatures. W.A.R. opposes public disclosure of registrants' information, arguing that after the offender has served his or her sentence and is leading a law-abiding life, his information should not be displayed on public websites. It notes that a public registry serves as a "hit-list" for vigilante attacks, and subject the children of even the most petty offenders to serious adverse consequences.

== Federal class action lawsuits ==
In April 2015 Women Against Registry announced that it has begun gathering information and participants for two class action lawsuits to be filed in United States federal court. One of the lawsuits is intended to be on behalf of registered sex offenders, and the second on behalf of families of registered sex offenders. According to W.A.R., both suits are to be filed in the United States 8th District Federal Court.

== Support Hotline ==
Women Against Registry operates a support hotline in collaboration with National Association for Rational Sexual Offense Laws and the Sex Offender Solutions & Education Network (SOSEN) to provide hope and support to registrants, their family members, and friends affected by the collateral damage caused by the sex offender registry. It is staffed by volunteers. The support hotline was originally an initiative of RSOL, but it is currently funded and operated by W.A.R..

== See also ==
- Alliance for Constitutional Sex Offense Laws
- Florida Action Committee
- Illinois Voices for Reform
- National Association for Rational Sexual Offense Laws
