= Sex offender =

Person who has committed a sex crime

A sex offender (sexual offender, sex abuser, or sexual abuser) is a person who has committed a sex crime. What constitutes a sex crime differs by culture and legal jurisdiction. The majority of convicted sex offenders have convictions for crimes of a sexual nature; however, some sex offenders have simply violated a law contained in a sexual category. Some of the serious crimes which result in a mandatory sex-offender classification are sexual assault, statutory rape, bestiality, child sexual abuse, incest, and rape.

Some sex offenders are deemed too dangerous to society to be released and are subjected to civil confinement – indefinite continuing incarceration, which is supposed to, but does not always, provide meaningful treatment to the offender. Sex offender registration laws in the United States may also classify less serious offenses as sexual offenses requiring sex offender registration. In some states public urination, having sex on a beach, or unlawful imprisonment of a minor also constitute sexual offenses.

== Overview ==
In looking at various types of offenses, an example of a digital obscenity offense is child pornography. In the modern world of technology, many jurisdictions are reforming their laws to prevent the over-prosecution of sex offenders and focusing on crimes involving a victim. The term sexual predator is often used to describe a sex offender or any of the "tier offenders"; however, only the category just below sexually violent sexual predator is reserved for a severe or repeated sex offender: sexual predator.

In the United States, the Adam Walsh Act (AWA) proposed to provide funding to each jurisdiction which would agree to incorporate its Act into their law. In the few jurisdictions accepting the agreement, there are Tier I, Tier II, or Tier III sex offenders. Individuals convicted of petty crimes not covered by the AWA are still liable to abide by the previous regulations denoting them as a sex offender (or habitual sex offender, sexual predator, sexually violent sexual predator, or child-victim offender).

In the United States, the United Kingdom, and other countries, a convicted sex offender is often required to register with the respective jurisdiction's sex offender registry. In the U.S., registry databases are often open to the public. Sexual offenders are sometimes classified by level. The highest-level offenders generally must register for their entire lives; low-level offenders may only need to register for a period of time.

== Recidivism ==
The level of recidivism in sexual offenders varies by surveys and by the types of sex offense. Some surveys reported it is lower than is commonly believed. However, according to the Office of Justice Programs (OJP) of the United States Department of Justice, observed recidivism rates of sex offenders are underestimates of actual reoffending. This is due to reasons such as the frequency with which sex crimes are not reported to police, the disparity between the number of sex offenses reported and those solved by arrest, and the disproportionate attrition of certain sex offenses and sex offenders within the criminal justice system. For example, Grotpeter and Elliot (2002) found that only 2.5% of sexual assaults and 10% of serious sexual assaults resulted in an arrest.

A 2002 study by the OJP following 9,691 male sex offenders released from prisons in 15 US states in 1994 indicated that within the first 3 years following their release, rearrest and reconviction rates for new sex offenses were 5.3 and 3.5 percent, respectively; that is, about 1 in 19 of released sex offenders were arrested within three years for another sex crime. The same study found that during the same 3 years from release, 68 percent of released non-sex offenders were re-arrested for any crime (and 47.8 percent reconvicted), while 43 percent of the released sex offenders were rearrested for any crime (and 24 percent reconvicted).

According to the OJP, the recidivism rate for sex offenders has been shown to be lower than any other crime except murder in New York State. Another report from the OJP which studied the recidivism of prisoners released in 1994 in 15 states (accounting for two-thirds of all prisoners released in the United States that year) reached the same conclusion. The recidivism rate for chikans and voyeurs is considerably higher than for other sex offenses, according to the Crime White Paper 2015 published by the Ministry of Justice of Japan. The survey reported 85.0% of the molesters and 64.9% of the voyeurs had a prior conviction for a sex offense.

Of released sex offenders who allegedly committed another sex crime, 40 percent perpetrated the new offense within a year or less from their prison discharge. Within three years of release, 2.5 percent of released rapists were rearrested for another rape, and 1.2 percent of those who had served time for homicide were arrested for a new homicide. Sex offenders were about four times more likely than non-sex offenders to be arrested for another sex crime after their discharge from prison (5.3 percent of sex offenders, versus 1.3 percent of non-sex offenders). In 1991, an estimated 24 percent of those serving time for rape and 19 percent of those serving time for sexual assault had been on probation (or parole) at the time of the offense for which they were in state prison.

Approximately 4,300 child molesters were released from prisons in 15 U.S. states in 1994. An estimated 3.3 percent of these 4,300 were rearrested for another sex crime against a child within 3 years of release from prison. Among child molesters released from prison in 1994, 60 percent had been in prison for molesting a child 13 years old or younger. The median age of victims of those imprisoned for sexual assault was less than 13 years old; the median age of rape victims was about 22 years. Child molesters were, on average, five years older than violent offenders who committed their crimes against adults. Nearly 25 percent of child molesters were age 40 or older, but about 10 percent of inmates with adult victims were in that age group.

=== Risk assessment ===
Various methods can be used to assess individual sex offenders' recidivism risk. Some risk assessment tools consider factors that have been empirically linked by research to sexual recidivism risk. These factors include biological and demographic markers, criminogenic correlates, behavioral and developmental indicators, and clinical markers that have been shown to be associated with reoffending. However, the quality of the studies that link various factors to sexual recidivism risk vary widely in terms of methodological rigor. For example, some studies link certain factors to sexual recidivism risk through clinical anecdotal evidence, which are sometimes criticized as less methodologically rigorous than other studies have used empirical approaches, including experimental methods.

There are at least four classifications of structured sexual recidivism risk assessment tools: empirical actuarial, mechanical, adjusted actuarial, and structured professional judgement. Of these classifications, empirical actuarial tools are the most methodologically rigorous because they contain explicit empirical risk factors, defined in advance, that are combined mechanically using explicitly defined guidelines into a score or risk category, and then linked to a recidivism probability estimate. Structured professional judgement (SPJ) tools are among the least methodologically rigorous risk assessment tools, because these tools specify items to be considered, and ultimately the clinician subjectively integrates the factors to reach assessment conclusions like "low," "moderate", or "high" risk. Furthermore, clinicians may also use unstructured sexual recidivism risk assessments, where they do not use any structured guidelines to aid in their risk assessment.

Researchers and practitioners consider some factors as "static", in that they do not change with time, such as number of prior sex offenses, victim gender, and deviant sexual arousal, and some other factors as "dynamic", such as an offender's compliance with supervision and treatment. By examining both types of factors, a more complete picture of the offender's risk can emerge, compared with static or dynamic factors used alone.

There is no single assessment tool that clinicians must use for assessing sexual recidivism risk, but there are tools that are widely used, such as the Static-99R. The Static-99R is the most popular actuarial scale in the United States.} The Static-99R is a 10-item scale for ranking a sex offender's relative risk of sexual recidivism compared other offenders. This scale is based on demographic and criminal history data, for example, age at release and number of prior sex offenses. Researchers have shown that the Static-99R is valid across a wide range of individuals (in terms of demographics, such as race/ethnicity). However, the Static-99R has only a modest ability to discriminate correctly between sex offenders and non sex offenders. This means that a randomly selected sex offender would be correctly classified as higher risk than a randomly selected non sex offender with "modest" accuracy. In addition, the Static-99R does not account for every factor that makes a sex offender more likely to reoffend. Despite these shortcomings, the Static-99R is arguably the highest quality tool, in terms of methodological rigor, that is widely available to clinicians to assess sex offender risk of recidivism.

== Post-incarceration registries and restrictions ==
A sex offender registry is a system in place in a number of jurisdictions designed to allow authorities to keep track of the residence and activity of sex offenders (including those released from prison). In some jurisdictions (especially in the United States), information in the registry is made available to the public via a website or other means. In many jurisdictions, registered sex offenders are subject to additional restrictions (including housing). Those on parole (or probation) may be subject to restrictions not applicable to other parolees or probationers. These include restrictions on being in the presence of minors, living in proximity to a school or daycare center, owning toys (or other items of interest to minors), or receiving a mark on their passport that informs authorities of destination countries for international travel. Israel's sex offender registry is accessible only to security officials, rather than to the general public.

Megan's Law, in the U.S., is designed to sanction sex offenders and reduce their recidivism rate. The law is enacted and enforced on a state-by-state basis. Most states also restrict where convicted sex offenders can live after their release, prohibiting residency within a designated distance of schools and daycare centers (usually 1,000–2,000 feet (300–610 m)). Guided by the 2007 Adam Walsh Child Protection and Safety Act, sex offenders must avoid such areas as schools, bus stops, gyms, recreation centers, playgrounds, parks, swimming pools, libraries, nursing homes, and places of worship by 500 to 2,500 feet (150 to 760 m). However, residence stipulations vary from state to state. Some states (such as Arkansas, Illinois, Washington and Idaho) do not require sex offenders to move from their residences if a forbidden facility is built or a law is enacted after the offender takes up residency. Many aspects of the laws are criticised by reformists and civil right groups like NARSOL and Human Rights Watch, and treatment professionals such as ATSA.

Committing to a residence requires a convicted sex offender to be notified of registration regulations by local law enforcement if convicted after January 1, 2005. The offender must act upon the notification within five business days of receipt. If and when an offender is released from incarceration, they must confirm their registration status within five business days. Registration data includes the offender's sex, height, weight, date of birth, identifying characteristics (if any), statutes violated, fingerprints and a current photograph. An offender's email addresses, chat room IDs and instant-messaging aliases must be surrendered to authorities. In Colorado, an offender must re-register when moving to a new address, changing their legal name, employment, volunteer activity, identifying information used online or enrollment status at a post-secondary educational institution. A web-based registration list may be found on county websites, which identifies adult convicted sex offenders who are sexually violent predators convicted of felony sexual acts, crimes of violence or failure to register as required. Legally, "any person who is a sexually violent predator and any person who is convicted as an adult...has a duty to register for the remainder of his or her natural life". Exceptions to this include deferred sentencing for the offense or petition of the court for termination of registration.

== Therapies and treatment ==
Behavior modification programs have been shown to reduce recidivism in sex offenders. Often, such programs use principles of applied behavior analysis. Two such approaches from this line of research have promise. The first uses operant conditioning approaches (which use reward and punishment to train new behavior, such as problem-solving) and the second uses respondent conditioning procedures, such as aversion therapy. Many of the behaviorism programs use covert sensitization and/or odor aversion: both are forms of aversion therapy, which have had ethical challenges. Such programs are effective in lowering recidivism by 15–18 percent. The use of aversion therapy remains controversial, and is an ethical issue related to the professional practice of behavior analysis. In 2007, the Texas State Auditor released a report showing that sex offenders who completed the Texas Sex Offender Treatment Program (SOTP) were 61 percent less likely to commit a new crime.

Chemical castration is used in some countries and U.S. states to treat male sex offenders. Unlike physical castration, it is reversible by stopping the medication. For male sex offenders with severe or extreme paraphilias, physical castration appears to be effective. It results in a 20-year re-offense rate of less than 2.3 percent (versus 80 percent in the untreated control group), according to a large 1963 study involving a total of 1036 sex offenders by the German researcher A. Langelüddeke. This was much lower than otherwise expected, compared with overall sex offender recidivism rates.

Several selective serotonin reuptake inhibitor-class antidepressant drugs (including fluoxetine and sertraline) have been known to reduce libido and produce sexual dysfunction as a side-effect. In the United Kingdom, use of these properties to intentionally lower the libido is an off-label use, but evidence is being gathered to support SSRI prescription for on-label use with sex offenders. Experiments have been conducted in which patients were divided into an unmedicated group, a group treated with the anti-androgen cyproterone acetate (CPA) which is used for chemical castration, and another treated with selective serotonin reuptake inhibitor-class antidepressant drugs (including fluoxetine and sertraline). Not only did medicated patients have lower SCS scores than unmedicated ones, the SSRI-treated group had lower scores than the CPA-treated group. As of 2026, a randomized controlled trial sponsored by Nottingham Trent University is underway to directly investigate and evaluate fluoxetine for this purpose ("Fluoxetine Assisted Sexual Arousal Reduction" or FASAR).

== Association with moral panics ==
It is argued that in the U.S., sex offenders have been selected as the new realization of moral panics about sex, stranger danger, and national paranoia, the new folk devils or boogeymen. People convicted of any sex crime are "transformed into a concept of evil, which is then personified as a group of faceless, terrifying, and predatory devils", who are, contrary to scientific evidence, perceived as a constant threat, habitually waiting for an opportunity to attack. Consequently, sex offenders are brought up by media on Halloween, despite the fact that there has never been a recorded case of abduction or abuse by a registered sex offender on Halloween.

Academics, treatment professionals, and law reform groups such as National Association for Rational Sexual Offense Laws and Women Against Registry criticize current sex offender laws as based on media-driven moral panic and "public emotion", rather than a real attempt to protect society. This can motivate legislators to pass knee-jerk laws to address public hysteria, echoing a "populist punitiveness" perspective. Many lawmakers feel that they will attract votes by appearing to be "tough on sex offenders". One discrepancy pointed out by critics is that John Walsh, father of Adam Walsh and supporter of the Adam Walsh Act, has admitted having a relationship with a 16-year-old girl while being in his early 20s and aware of age of consent being 17 in New York, meaning that, had he been convicted, John Walsh himself could be required to register as a sex offender. Since passage of the Adam Walsh Act, Walsh himself has criticized the law, stating "You can't paint sex offenders with a broad brush."

Critics point out that contrary to media depictions, abductions by predatory offenders are very rare and 93% of child sexual abuse is committed by someone the child knows: a family member, a family friend or someone in a position of authority. According to the U.S. Department of Justice, sex offender recidivism is 5.3%, the lowest for any type of crime except homicide.

Critics say that, while originally aimed at the worst offenders, as a result of moral panic the laws have gone through series of amendments, many named after the victim of a highly publicized predatory offense, expanding the scope of the laws to low-level offenders, and treating them the same as predatory offenders, leading to the disproportionate punishment of being placed on a public sex offender registry, with the consequent restrictions on movement, employment, and housing. As a result of this persistent media narrative of sex offenders, this panic is being preserved, leading legislators to make registration mandatory for all sex offences, without the possibility of judicial discretion for less dangerous offenders.

== See also ==
- United States National Sex Offenders Public Registry
- Jacob Wetterling Crimes Against Children and Sexually Violent Offender Registration Act
- Jessica's Law
- To Catch a Predator

== Works cited ==
- Bradford, J.M.W. (1999). "The Paraphilias, Obsessive Compulsive Spectrum Disorder, and the Treatment of Sexually Deviant Behaviour". Psychiatric Quarterly. 70 (3): 209–219. doi:10.1023/A:1022099026059. PMID 10457546.
- Fox, Kathryn J. (March 2013). "Incurable Sex Offenders, Lousy Judges & The Media: Moral Panic Sustenance in the Age of New Media". American Journal of Criminal Justice. 38 (1): 160–181. doi:10.1007/s12103-012-9154-6. ISSN 1066-2316.
- Hanson, R. Karl; Morton-Bourgon, Kelly E. (2009). "The accuracy of recidivism risk assessments for sexual offenders: A meta-analysis of 118 prediction studies". Psychological Assessment. 21 (1): 1–21. doi:10.1037/a0014421. ISSN 1939-134X. PMID 19290762.
- Knowles, Jon (2019). How Sex Got Screwed Up: The Ghosts that Haunt Our Sexual Pleasure - Book Two. Vernon Press. ISBN 9781622736928.
- Hanson, R. Karl (March 1998). "What do we know about sex offender risk assessment?". Psychology, Public Policy, and Law. 4 (1–2): 50–72. doi:10.1037/1076-8971.4.1-2.50. ISSN 1939-1528.
- Helmus, L. Maaike (June 2018). "Sex Offender Risk Assessment: Where Are We and Where Are We Going?". Current Psychiatry Reports. 20 (6): 46. doi:10.1007/s11920-018-0909-8. ISSN 1523-3812. PMID 29779064.
- Levenson, Jill S.; Brannon, Yolanda N.; Fortney, Timothy; Baker, Juanita (December 2007). "Public Perceptions About Sex Offenders and Community Protection Policies". Analyses of Social Issues and Public Policy. 7 (1): 137–161. doi:10.1111/j.1530-2415.2007.00119.x. ISSN 1529-7489.
- Maguire, Mary; Singer, Jennie Kaufman (November 2011). "A False Sense of Security: Moral Panic Driven Sex Offender Legislation". Critical Criminology. 19 (4): 301–312. doi:10.1007/s10612-010-9127-3. ISSN 1205-8629.
- Marshall, W.L.; Jones, Robin; Ward, Tony; Johnston, Peter; Barbaree, H.E. (January 1991). "Treatment outcome with sex offenders". Clinical Psychology Review. 11 (4): 465–485. doi:10.1016/0272-7358(91)90119-F.
- Mcalinden, Anne-Marie (1 May 2006). "Managing risk: From regulation to the reintegration of sexual offenders". Criminology and Criminal Justice. 6 (2): 201. doi:10.1177/1748895806062981. S2CID 145256781.
- Melton, Gary B.; Petrila, John; Poythress, Norman G.; Slobogin, Christopher; Otto, Randy K.; Mossman, Douglas; Condie, Lois O. (2017-12-04). Psychological Evaluations for the Courts, Fourth Edition: A Handbook for Mental Health Professionals and Lawyers. Guilford Publications. ISBN 978-1-4625-3553-8.
- Nezu, Christine Maguth; Fiore, Alicia A.; Nezu, Arthur M. (2006). "Problem solving treatment for intellectually disabled sex offenders". International Journal of Behavioral Consultation and Therapy. 2 (2): 266–276. doi:10.1037/h0100781. ISSN 1555-7855.
- Phenix, Amy; Fernandez, Yolanda; Harris, Andrew J. R.; Helmus, Maaike; Hanson, R. Karl; Thornton, David (2017). Static-99R Coding Rules Revised – 2016 (PDF). Public Safety Canada.
- Rea, Jerry A.; Williams, Dean; Saunders, Kathryn J.; Dixon, Michael; Wright, Kasey; Spradlin, Joseph E. (2003). "Covert sensitization: A generalization analysis in the laboratory and natural environment through the use of a portable-penile plethysmograph". The Behavior Analyst Today. 4 (2): 192–201. doi:10.1037/h0100119. ISSN 1539-4352.
- Walker, Bela (19 January 2011). "Essay: Deciphering Risk: Sex Offender Statutes and Moral Panic in a Risk Society". The University of Baltimore Law Review. 40 (2).
- Walsh, John; Walsh, Susan (2008). Tears of rage: from grieving father to crusader for justice: the untold story of the Adam Walsh case. New York: Pocket Books. ISBN 978-1439136348.
- Wright, Richard G. (2014). Sex offender laws: failed policies, new directions (2 ed.). Springer Publishing Company. ISBN 978-0826196712.
