= Jessica's Law =

2005 Florida law on victim rights

Florida State Legislature
- Full name: An act relating to sexual predators and sexual offenders; providing a popular name; amending s. 775.21, F.S.; revising criteria for sexual predator designation, extending period for petition to remove sexual predator designation; creating s. 775.235, F.S.; prohibiting the harboring of a sexual predator or sexual offender; providing criminal penalties; amending s. 921.141, F.S.; creating an aggravating circumstance pertaining to sexual predators for purposes of imposing the death penalty; amending s. 947.1405, F.S.; requiring sexual offenders and sexual predators on conditional release to be placed on electronic monitoring; creating s. 947.1406, F.S.; providing requirements for electronic monitoring of sexual offenders and sexual predators on conditional release; amending s. 948.30, F.S.; requiring sexual offenders and sexual predators on community control or probation to be placed on electronic monitoring; amending s. 948.11, F.S.; providing requirements for electronic monitoring of sexual offenders and sexual predators on community control or probation; providing an effective date.
- Introduced: April 1, 2005
- House voted: April 22, 2005 (115-0)
- Senate voted: April 21, 2005 (40-0)
- Signed into law: May 2, 2005
- Sponsor: Criminal Justice Committee
- Governor: Jeb Bush
- Code: Florida Statutes
- Bill: HB 1887
- Website: Florida House website

Status: Current legislation

Jessica's Law is the informal name given to a 2005 Florida law, as well as laws in several other states, designed to protect potential victims and reduce a sexual offender's ability to re-offend which includes a mandatory minimum sentence of 25 years in prison and lifetime electronic monitoring when the victim is less than 12 years old. A version of Jessica's Law, known as the Jessica Lunsford Act, was introduced at the federal level in 2005 but was never enacted into law by Congress.

The name is also used by the media to designate all legislation and potential legislation in other states modeled after the Florida law. Forty-two states have introduced such legislation since Florida's law was passed.

The law is named after Jessica Lunsford, a 9 year old Florida girl who was kidnapped, raped, and murdered in February 2005 by John Couey, a previously convicted sex offender. Public outrage over this case spurred Florida officials to introduce this legislation. Among the key provisions of the law was classifying lewd or lascivious molestation on a person under the age of 12 as a life felony, and a mandatory minimum sentence of 25 years in prison and lifetime electronic monitoring of persons 18 and older convicted of lewd or lascivious molestation against a victim less than 12 years old. Lewd or lascivious molestation is defined as "A person who intentionally touches in a lewd or lascivious manner the breasts, genitals, genital area, or buttocks, or the clothing covering them,... or forces or entices a person to so touch the perpetrator." The statute also requires that if an offender is sentenced to a term of years, he or she must be given lifetime probation following the imprisonment. In Florida, another charge, capital sexual battery is defined as: A person 18 years of age or older who commits sexual battery upon, or in an attempt to commit sexual battery injures the sexual organs of, a person less than 12 years of age commits a capital felony. Sexual battery is defined as oral, anal, or vaginal penetration by, or union with, the sexual organ of another or the anal or vaginal penetration of another by any other object, except for bonafide medical purposes. The charge of capital sexual battery carries a mandatory sentence of life in prison without parole.

== Jessica Lunsford Act ==
The Jessica Lunsford Act (H.R. 1505 of the 109th Congress), was a proposed federal law in the United States — modeled after the Florida state law — which, if adopted, would have mandated more stringent tracking of released sex offenders.

=== Bill objectives ===
The bill, if passed, would have greatly reduced federal grant money under the Violent Crime Control and Law Enforcement Act of 1994 (42 U.S.C. § 14071) and Omnibus Crime Control and Safe Streets Act of 1968 (42 U.S.C. § 3765) to any U.S. State that failed to conform its sex offender registration laws to the following:

- Sex offenders would have been required to wear Global Positioning System devices on their ankles for five years following their release from prison, or for life for those deemed sexual predators, to better enable law enforcement personnel to track their whereabouts. The costs of tracking and monitoring offenders would have been absorbed by each State.
- States would have been required to mail sex offender registration forms at least twice per year, at random times, to verify registrants' addresses. Any registrants who did not respond within 10 days would have to be considered non-compliant.

The bill was introduced by U.S. Republican Congresswoman Ginny Brown-Waite from Florida on April 6, 2005. It had 107 cosponsors and was referred to a subcommittee of the House Judiciary Committee, but it was never voted upon (either by any committee or the full Congress), and it died when the 109th Congress finally adjourned.

=== Impact on offender's family members ===
Advocates for convicted sex offenders claim that the civil rights of convicted persons and their non-offending family members is forever affected, long after the punishment has ended. Internet publication of sex offenders' home addresses continues to be upheld by the court in the name of public safety, although a series of vigilante-type murders in Maine in April 2006 have brought new concerns of misuse of the registry and for the safety of non-offending family members by private parties. Missouri civil rights attorney Arthur Benson currently awaits a decision from the Missouri Supreme Court regarding the Sex Offenders Registration and Notification Act (SORNA) litigation, Jane Doe I, et al. v. Thomas Phillips et al. which "contends the act violates substantive due process rights and equal protection rights because it infringes on fundamental liberty rights, imposes a lifetime stigma, has no express purpose and, even if it serves a compelling interest, is not narrowly tailored or rationally related to that interest. They assert that, if the act is deemed to be criminal in nature, it violates the prohibition against ex post facto laws because it imposes an additional punishment, thereby altering the consequences for a crime for which they already have been sentenced."

== See also ==
- California Proposition 83 (2006)
- Penile plethysmography
- Megan's Law
- Sarah's Law
- Clare's Law
