= Interrupted time series =

Method of analysis involving tracking a long-term period around an intervention

Interrupted time series analysis (ITS), sometimes known as quasi-experimental time series analysis, is a method of statistical analysis involving tracking a long-term period before and after a point of intervention to assess the intervention's effects. The time series refers to the data over the period, while the interruption is the intervention, which is a controlled external influence or set of influences. Effects of the intervention are evaluated by changes in the level and slope of the time series and statistical significance of the intervention parameters. Interrupted time series design is the design of experiments based on the interrupted time series approach.

The method is used in various areas of research, such as:

- political science: impact of changes in laws on the behavior of people; (e.g., Effectiveness of sex offender registration policies in the United States)
- economics: impact of changes in credit controls on borrowing behavior;
- sociology: impact of experiments in income maintenance on the behavior of participants in welfare programs;
- history: impact of major historical events on the behavior of those affected by the events;
- psychology: impact of expressing emotional experiences on online content;
- medicine: in medical research, medical treatment is an intervention whose effect are to be studied. The effect of the intervention can be measured with interrupted time series.
- marketing research: to analyze the effect of "designed market interventions" (e.g., advertising) on sales.
- environmental sciences: impacts of human activities on environmental quality and ecosystem dynamics (e.g., forest logging on local climate).

== See also ==
- Quasi-experimental design
- Segmented regression
