= Close case =

In the law, a close case is generally defined as a ruling that could conceivably be decided in more than one way. Various scholars have attempted to articulate criteria for identifying close cases, and commentators have observed that reliance upon precedent established in close cases leads to the gradual expansion of legal doctrines.

== Identifying close cases ==
Although some scholars have suggested that "a close case is in the eye of the beholder", other scholars have attempted to articulate specific criteria for identifying close cases. Maureen Armoor, for example, defines close cases as "the articulable outer limit of judicial discretion that most closely approximates the phenomenological experience of a sitting judge, in particular the dimension of discretion called into play when a judge is uncertain about an outcome". Ward Farnsworth, the dean of the University of Texas School of Law, suggested that close cases could be defined as either "cases close enough to provoke dissent" or cases that "are flexible enough to comfortably admit of more than one reading". Likewise, a 1980 comment in the Stanford Law Review defined close cases as appellate decisions that generated multiple dissenting opinions.

== Consequences of close cases ==
Northwestern University Professor of Law John E. Coons observed, "Under a system of winner-take-all the one-sided result reached upon principle in the close case must continue to trouble the conscience of the law".

Judge Guido Calabresi, a former dean of Yale Law School, noted that close cases create a "slippery slope", and the "next close case comes up and the precedent [established in the last close case] is applied: same thing, same thumb on the scale, same decision". Calabresi argued that this process ultimately leads to the ongoing expansion of doctrine that was originally established only on a narrow basis. Additionally, Farnsworth has argued that judges often resolve close cases "according to beliefs the judges bring to the case that don’t owe much to law".

== See also ==
- Judicial discretion
- Scope of review
