= Effectiveness of sex offender registration policies in the United States =

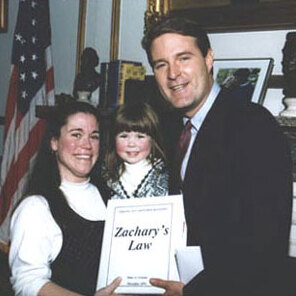
Governor of Indiana Evan Bayh marks the passage of "Zachary's Law", which requires a statewide Sex Offender Registry, with Sandy Snider, whose son Zachary Snyder was sexually abused and murdered by a neighbor

Sex offender registration and notification (SORN) laws in the United States are widely accepted, with supporters believing that disclosing the location of sex offenders residence improves the public's ability to guard themselves and their children from sexual victimization. Despite this wide public acceptance, empirical observations do not uniformly support this belief.

Critics argue that the statistics do not reveal a statistically significant shift in sexual offense trends following the implementation of sex offender registration and notification (SORN) regimes. A few studies indicate that sexual recidivism may have been lowered by SORN policies, while a few have found statistically significant increase in sex crimes following SORN implementation.

== Effectiveness of registration and notification ==
According to the Office of Justice Programs' SMART Office, sex offender registration and notification requirements arguably have been implemented in the absence of empirical evidence regarding their effectiveness.

According to Association for the Treatment of Sexual Abusers, the states (e.g. Minnesota, Washington) where community notification has indicated some effectiveness employ empirically derived sex offender risk assessment procedures and apply public notification only on high risk offenders. Some policies — especially residency restrictions and community notification — may adversely impact on public safety due to the obstacles they create to successful reintegration of an offender.

It has been suggested that sex offender registration and notification (SORN) policies may be a specific deterrent for sex offenders; that it would facilitate sex offender awareness, monitoring, and apprehension; and that it would in the end help prevent sex offenses—particularly repeat sex offenses—from occurring. While these hypotheses were not empirically tested prior to the implementation of SORN requirements, a significant body of research using various methods has since examined the impact of SORN, particularly in relation to recidivism.

Prescott and Rockoff (2011) found that Sex Offender Registration policies in the United States were effective at reducing crime by providing general deterrence. The study found that non public registration policies were effective in reducing sex crime arrests due to enhanced police monitoring of existing offenders. However public registration was found to cause an increased rate of recidivism among Sex Offenders on the public register. There is considerable debate among academics as to how "Effectiveness" should be defined. Many see the increased rate of recidivism among registered offenders as a failure; others point to the deterrent effect of Sex Offender Registration and Notification Laws (SORN) as being evidence of success.

=== Interrupted time series analysis studies ===
One research method employed to assess the effectiveness of SORN for adult sexual offenders is interrupted time series analysis, which essentially examines an outcome of interest using many observations before and after the implementation of a specific intervention. Several interrupted time series analyses assessing SORN have been completed in recent years.

A study done in University of Chicago Law School compared data on over 9,000 sex offenders released from prison in 1994. About half of those offenders were released into states where they needed to register, while the other half did not need to register. The study found little difference in the two groups' propensity to re-offend. In fact, those released into states without registration laws were slightly less likely to re-offend. The study also showed that blocks in Washington DC where sex offenders lived did not have higher rate of sex crimes nor overall crimes. The study concluded that registered sex offenders do not appear to have lower rates of recidivism than those sex offenders who are not required to register, and that knowing where a sex offender lives does not reveal where sex crimes, or other crimes, will take place.

A study conducted in University of Michigan Law School in 2008, distinguishing between the effects of registration (police- only) and community notification (public registries), analyzed Uniform Crime Reports (UCR) data from 15 states over more than 10 years. The study found evidence that police-only registration laws reduce the frequency of reported sex offenses, particularly when the number of registrants is large but making the registry information available to the broader public may "backfire", leading to higher overall rates of sex crime. An average-size registry was estimated to decrease crime by approximately 1.21 sex offenses per 10,000 people, which correspond to 13 percent reduction on average. This drop in crime was found to benefit local victims (acquaintances, neighbors, and victims of known offenders, as well as possibly family members, friends, and significant others). The study found no evidence that registration had any effect to the level of crime against strangers. The same study found that notification laws may affect sex offense frequency, although not in a way as lawmakers intended. Notification laws were found to reduce the number of sex offenses when the size of the registry is small but these benefits disappear when more offenders are made subject to notification requirements. Making the registration information public was found to increase the number of sex offenses by more than 1.57 percent. The authors concluded that providing information on convicted sex offenders to local authorities may be beneficial as this increases monitoring and likelihood of punishment for recidivism, which translates to lower rate of recidivism as predicted in simple model of criminal behavior. By making the same information public offenders become more likely to commit crimes because the associated psychological, social, or financial costs make crime-free life relatively less attractive.

A similar analysis focused on the impact of SORN on rape in 10 states. Using Uniform Crime Report (UCR) data on rapes reported to the police as the outcome measure, the study found that statistically significant reductions in reported rape occurred following the implementation of SORN in 3 of the 10 states (Hawaii, Idaho, and Ohio). In six states (Arkansas, Connecticut, Nebraska, Nevada, Oklahoma, and West Virginia), no significant change was observed following SORN implementation, and one state (California) actually had a statistically significant increase in sex crimes following SORN implementation. Based on the varied findings, the authors concluded there was no systematic influence of SORN on the rate of reported rape.

Several studies have examined the impact of SORN in individual states. For example, in South Carolina, adult sex crimes were compared to nonsexual assault and robbery crimes pre- and post-SORN implementation (N=194,575, of which 19,060 were sex crime arrests). Data were examined for 1990 through 2005. SORN implementation occurred in 1995. The study found that the sex crime rate declined by 11 percent from pre- to post-SORN while the rates of assault and robbery did not, suggesting the possibility that SORN was a deterrent to sex crimes.

A number of state studies did not find evidence that SORN implementation positively impacted the rate of sexual offending or recidivism. One of these studies was also focused on South Carolina. In the South Carolina study that did not find evidence of a positive SORN effect, recidivism was examined in the context of registration status for 6,064 male offenders convicted of at least one sex crime in that state between 1990 and 2004. The study found that registration status did not predict recidivism.

Another state study taking place in New York analyzed sex crime, assault, robbery, burglary, and larceny arrests from 1986 through 2006. Study results indicated that the implementation of the state's sex offender registry did not decrease the rearrest rate for convicted sex offenders, deter non-registered offenders from offending, or decrease the overall rate of sex crimes. It was also noted that 94.1 percent of child molestation arrests were for first-time sex offenders.

An analysis that focused on South Carolina juveniles who committed sexual offenses between 1990 and 2004 (N = 1275) found that 7.5 percent were charged with a new sex offense and 2.5 percent were adjudicated for a new sex offense during a 9-year follow-up period. More importantly, the researchers found that registration was not associated with sexual recidivism; however, nonsexual, nonassault recidivism (defined as a new charge) significantly decreased for those on the registry.

A meta-study by professor Kristen M. Zgoba from Florida International University and Meghan A. Mitchell from the University of Central Florida found 18 studies that had been done on the effectiveness of sex offender registration and notification laws by September 2021. Of these 18 studies, 7 studies concluded that registration and notification laws decreased recidivism, 5 studies concluded that registration and notification laws increased recidivism, and 6 studies concluded that registration and notification laws did not either increase or decrease recidivism.

=== Studies employing a comparison group ===
Several state-level studies have not found evidence of a positive SORN effect. For example, in an Iowa study, a group of sex offenders subject to registry requirement (n = 233) who were also under legal supervision were compared to a matched group of preregistry sex offenders not under supervision (n = 201). In a 4.3-year followup, the registry group sexually recidivated (defined as a new sex crime conviction) at a rate of 3 percent, compared to the nonregistry group's 3.5-percent recidivism rate. This difference was not statistically significant. However, when the recidivism rates of parolees and probationers were compared, the researchers found that registration requirements may have had more of an impact on parolees.

In New Jersey, researchers compared the recidivism rates of offenders subject to SORN with those of offenders who were not subject to this strategy (n = 550). Based on a 6.5-year follow-up period, offenders subject to SORN recidivated at a rate of 7 percent, compared to 11 percent for offenders who were not subject to SORN; however, these differences were not found to be statistically significant.

In Wisconsin, the recidivism rates of sex offenders subject to registration and extensive notification between 1997 and 1999 (n = 47) were compared with those of sex offenders who had limited notification requirements (n = 166). No statistically significant differences in sex crime rearrest rates over a 4-year follow-up period were found, as 19 percent of the extensive notification group sexually recidivated, compared to 12 percent for the limited notification group.

Similar findings were reported in a Washington state study. Again, the recidivism rates of sex offenders subject to SORN (n = 139) were compared with those of sex offenders not subject to SORN. Based on a 54-month followup, sex offenders subject to SORN were found to have a sex crime rearrest rate of 19 percent while the rate for the non-SORN group was 22 percent, a difference that is not statistically significant.

In a study of New York sex offenders pre- and post-community notification (N = 10,592), researchers found no significant differences in sexual (7 percent) or general (46.6 percent) rearrest rates based on an 8.2-year follow-up period.

One study finding a positive effect examined the recidivism of 8,359 sexual offenders in Washington state. Some of those offenders were subject to SORN, while others were not because SORN requirements were not yet in place. The study found that the sex offenders subject to SORN sexually recidivated (defined as a new Washington state conviction for a felony sex crime) at a 2-percent rate, while the pre-SORN group recidivated at a 7-percent rate.

In Minnesota, a law requiring community notification on high-risk offenders was implemented in 1997. To examine the relationship between community notification and recidivism, the Minnesota Department of Corrections conducted a study comparing differences between three groups. A notification group consisted of 155 Level 3 ("high public risk") sex offenders. This group was subject to broad community notification after release from Minnesota prisons between 1997 and 2002. Two control groups were compared with this notification group. The first control group—prenotification—was built using a statistical matching technique and consisted of 125 offenders released between 1990-1997 who likely would have been assigned to Level 3, and would have been subject to community notification had the law been at place at the time of their release. A second control group—non-notification—consisted of offenders assigned to Level 1 and Level 2 who were released between 1997-2002 and not subject to broad community notification. The sexual re-conviction rates within a 3-year period for the notification, pre-notification and non-notification groups was found to be 3.2%, 32.8% and 9.6%, respectively. The authors concluded that these results suggest a community notification system based on tiered risk-management has an effect of reducing recidivism, although they noted that part of the effect might arise from heightened penalties and post-release supervision, improved treatment, or unmeasured historical factors unique to the 1990-1996 period. They further concluded that applying community notification to low-risk offenders would hinder their ability for successful community re-entry, and probably would not produce appreciable reduction in sexual recidivism given the low base rate (5-7% within 3 years) of recidivism in that sample.

== Effectiveness of registration requirements for juvenile offenders ==
A majority of states have some kind of registration for juveniles adjudicated delinquent of sex offenses. The vast majority of those states require registration and public notification for juveniles transferred for trial and convicted as an adult. In a review of UCR sex crime arrest data from 47 states for 1994 through 2009, a statistically significant decrease in the rate of sex crime arrest in either juvenile registration states or juvenile notification states after implementation of SORN policies was not found.

== Effectiveness of residency restrictions ==
Some SORN laws regulate where sex offenders are permitted to live. According to Office of Justice Programs' SMART Office, there is no empirical support for the effectiveness of residence restrictions. In fact, a number of negative unintended consequences have been empirically identified, including loss of housing, loss of support systems, and financial hardship that may aggravate rather than mitigate offender risk. In addition, residence restrictions lead to the displacement and clustering of sex offenders into other areas, particularly rural areas.
