= Judicial discretion =

Judicial discretion is the power of the judiciary to make some legal decisions according to its discretion. Under the doctrine of the separation of powers, the ability of judges to exercise discretion is an aspect of judicial independence. When appropriate, judicial discretion allows a judge to decide a legal case or matter within a range of possible decisions.

However, when the exercise of discretion goes beyond constraints that are set down by legislation, binding precedent, or a constitution, the court may be abusing its discretion and undermining the rule of law. In that case, the decision of the court may be ultra vires and sometimes characterized as judicial activism.

== Analysis ==
In 1824, US Chief Justice John Marshall wrote the following on judicial discretion:

Judicial power, as contradistinguished from the power of the laws, has no existence. Courts are the mere instruments of the law, and can will nothing. When they are said to exercise a discretion, it is a mere legal discretion, a discretion to be exercised in discerning the course prescribed by law; and, when that is discerned, it is the duty of the court to follow it. Judicial power is never exercised for the purpose of giving effect to the will of the judge, always for the purpose of giving effect to the will of the legislature; or, in other words, to the will of the law.

Concerns with regard to recidivism and other law-and-order issues have led to the introduction of mandatory sentencing. For example, three-strikes laws and most US sex offender registry laws are examples of laws carrying severe consequences and not leaving room for sentencing judges to consider the actual gravity of the offense, thus significantly limiting judicial discretion in sentencing.

The introduction of mandatory minimum sentences in criminal law is often viewed as a shift of judicial power from judges to prosecutors, who can affect the length of the potential sentence by their charging decision such as by filing charges on the lesser included offense and by dropping the charges carrying mandatory minimum sentences.

Mandatory sentencing laws have been particularly popular among legislators in the United States. That has provoked the formation of non-profit organizations such as Families Against Mandatory Minimums, Women Against Registry, and the National Association for Rational Sexual Offense Laws, which lobby for the reinstatement of judicial discretion in criminal sentencing.

== See also ==
- Aharon Barak
- Close case
- Political bias
- Sentencing disparity
