= Constitutionality of sex offender registries in the United States =

Constitutional issue of United States law

The constitutionality of sex offender registries in the United States has been challenged on a number of state and federal constitutional grounds. While the Supreme Court of the United States has twice upheld sex offender registration laws, in 2015 it vacated a requirement that an offender submit to lifetime ankle-bracelet monitoring, finding it was a Fourth Amendment search that was later ruled constitutionally unreasonable by the state court.

State constitutional challenges to certain aspects of registration laws have generally been more successful, although the grounds vary by state.

== Federal law ==
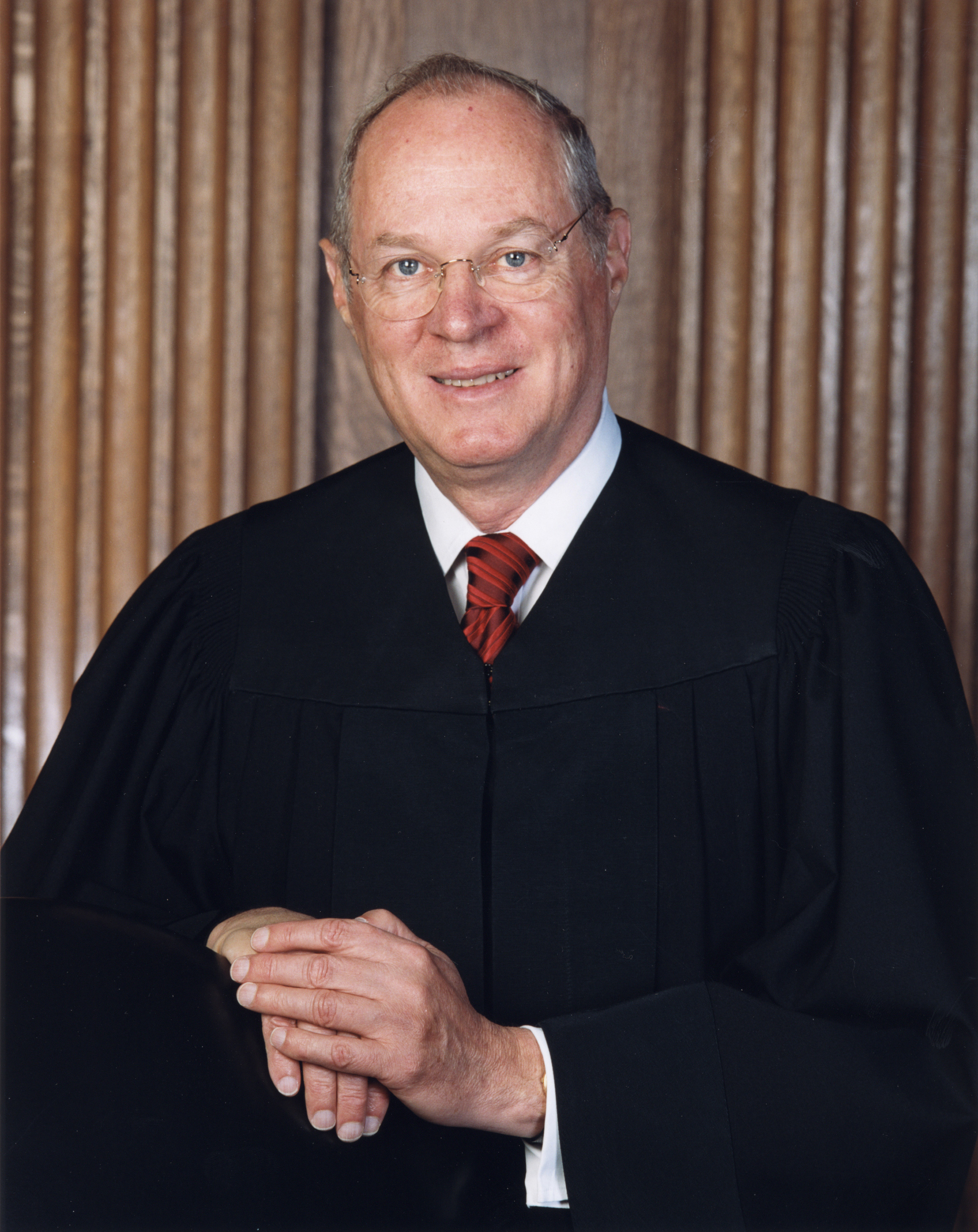
Anthony Kennedy, Associate Justice of the Supreme Court of the United States

Challenges under U.S. federal law have claimed violations of the ex post facto, due process, cruel and unusual punishment, equal protection and search and seizure provisions of the United States Constitution. U.S. Supreme Court decisions have rejected broad challenges to the registration and notification laws. Limited challenges on federal law grounds, in particular objections to GPS tracking and restrictions on use of social media, have been more successful.

In McKune v. Lile, 536 U.S. 24, 33 (2002), the Supreme Court upheld a Kansas law that imposed harsher sentences on offenders who refused to participate in a prison treatment program. Writing in a 5-4 plurality opinion, Justice Kennedy said sex offenders pose "frightening and high risk of recidivism", which, "of untreated offenders has been estimated to be as high as 80%."

In Connecticut Dept. of Public Safety v. Doe (2002) the Court upheld laws in Alaska and Connecticut mandating public disclosure of sex offender information.

The following year, in Smith v. Doe, 538 U.S. 84 (2003), the Supreme Court upheld Alaska's registration statute, reasoning that sex offender registration is civil measure reasonably designed to protect public safety, not a punishment, which can be applied ex post facto. It also said Connecticut's sex-offender registration statute did not violate offenders' procedural due process of rights, but "expresse[d] no opinion as to whether the State's law violates substantive due process principles." As sex offender registration is a civil matter, not punishment, the Court ruled 6–3 it was not an unconstitutional ex post facto law. Justices John Paul Stevens, Ruth Bader Ginsburg, and Stephen Breyer dissented. Justice Kennedy maintained his earlier position from McKune v. Lile, writing

Alaska could conclude that a conviction for a sex offense provides evidence of substantial risk of recidivism. The legislature’s findings are consistent with grave concerns over the high rate of recidivism among convicted sex offenders and their dangerousness as a class. The risk of recidivism posed by sex offenders is "frightening and high." McKune v. Lile, 536 U. S. 24, 34 (2002)...

— Justice Anthony Kennedy, Smith v. Doe, 538 U.S. 84 (2003)

In 2015, in Grady v. North Carolina, 575 U.S. 306 (2015), the U.S. Supreme Court vacated a North Carolina law that required lifetime satellite-based ankle bracelet monitoring of a recidivist sex offender post-release. The court reasoned that such a law was a Fourth Amendment search and remanded the issue to the North Carolina court for a decision on whether the search was unreasonable. On remand, the North Carolina Supreme Court held that the monitoring program was an unreasonable search, saying that offenders did not, by virtue of their status as recidivists, forfeit their rights to bodily integrity and freedom from search.

In 2017, in Packingham v. North Carolina, 582 U.S. 98 (2017), the Supreme Court held that another North Carolina statute, which prohibited registered sex offenders from using social media websites, was an unconstitutional restriction of freedom of speech under the First Amendment to the U.S. Constitution.

=== Criticism of data relied upon by the Supreme Court ===
The data relied on by Justice Kennedy has been criticized by scholars and others. According to a 2015 study by law professor Ira Mark Ellman and consultant Tara Ellman, certain statistics cited by Justice Kennedy are "false 'facts'". Ellman noted that in McKune v. Lile the solicitor general cited only one source for its claim "that the recidivism rate of untreated offenders has been estimated to be as high as 80%." The source for the claim was the U.S. Department of Justice, National Institute of Corrections, A Practitioner’s Guide to Treating the Incarcerated Male Sex Offender, released in 1988. The study found the practitioner's guide itself cites only one source, from "a mass market magazine aimed at a lay audience", and that source relied upon an unsupported assertion by a treatment program counselor who was neither a scholar nor an expert in sex offender recidivism. Furthermore, the article was about a counseling program the counselor had run in Oregon prison, not about sex crime recidivism. The Ellman study concluded that claims of high re-offense rates among all sex offenders, and the effectiveness of counseling programs in reducing it, were merely "unsupported assertion[s] of someone without research expertise who made his living selling such counseling programs to prisons", and that use by the Supreme Court in McKune v. Lile was irresponsible.

=== Fifth Circuit commerce clause arguments ===
In United States v. Kebodeaux (5th Cir., 2012), the United States Fifth Circuit Court of Appeals rejected the argument that federal sex offender registry requirements could be based upon the commerce clause to the United States Constitution.

== State court rulings ==
=== Alaska ===
On 25 July 2008, the Alaska Supreme Court ruled that the Alaska Sex Offender Registration Act's registration violated the ex post facto clause of the state's constitution and ruled that the requirement does not apply to persons who committed their crimes before the act became effective on 10 August 1994.

=== California ===
The California Supreme Court ruled on 2 March 2015 that a state law barring sex offenders from living within 2,000 feet of a school or park is unconstitutional. The ruling immediately affects only San Diego County, where the case originated. The court found that in San Diego County, the 2,000-feet rule meant that less than 3 percent of multi-unit housing was available to offenders. Additionally, federal law banned anyone in a state database of sex offenders from receiving federal housing subsidies after June 2001.

=== Florida ===
Florida passed a law that mandates law enforcement to notify the public of "sexual predators". This has led to some law enforcement agencies placing large red signs in front of the homes of serious sex offenders stating the name of the person and that they live at that address. Florida is one of the most restrictive states in the US when it comes to sex offender laws.

=== Hawaii ===
In State v. Bani, 36 P.3d 1255 (Haw. 2001), the Hawaii State Supreme Court held that Hawaii's sex offender registration statute violated the due process clause of the Constitution of Hawaii, ruling that it deprived potential registrants "of a protected liberty interest without due process of law". The Court reasoned that the sex offender law authorized "public notification of (the potential registrant's) status as a convicted sex offender without notice, an opportunity to be heard, or any preliminary determination of whether and to what extent (he) actually represents a danger to society".

=== Maryland ===
In 2013 The Maryland Court of Appeals, the highest court of Maryland, declared that the state could not require the registration of people who committed their crimes before October 1995, when the database was established.

=== Michigan ===
U.S. District Court Judge Robert Cleland issued a ruling March 31, 2015 striking down four portions of Michigan's Sex Offender Registry Act, calling them unconstitutional. A ruling stated the "geographic exclusion zones" in the Sex Offender Registry Act, such as student safety areas that stretch for 1,000 feet around schools, are unconstitutional. Judge Cleland also stated law enforcement does not have strong enough guidelines to know how to measure the 1,000-foot exclusion zone around schools. Neither sex offenders or law enforcement have the tools or data to determine the zones.

On appeal the Sixth Circuit ruled that Michigan's 2006 amendments (which created the "geographic exclusion zones") and 2011 amendments which enhanced reporting requirements violated prohibitions against retroactive (ex post facto) laws. The Supreme Court then denied cert on appeal. In 2019 Judge Cleland gave legislature 90 days to rewrite the laws, which they did not. In February, 2020 Judge Cleland again gave the legislature 90 days to make the laws constitutional and ruled that the current law would be null and void to all pre 2011 registrants after that date if the legislature fails to act.

In September 2026 the Michigan Supreme Court ruled that the 2011 amendments were an unconstitutional retroactive punishment when applied to people who committed their crimes prior to 2011, despite a 2021 Michigan law purporting to extend the requirements to them. This resulted in more than 20,000 registrants being removed from the list including former university and gymnastics association doctor Larry Nassar. This followed an earlier 2026 ruling permitting such registrants to apply to set aside their convictions for violating the laws.

=== Missouri ===
Many successful challenges to sex offender registration laws in the United States have been in Missouri because of a unique provision in the Missouri Constitution (Article I, Section 13) prohibiting laws "retrospective in [their] operation".

In Doe v. Phillips, 194 S.W.3d 837 (Mo. banc 2006), the Supreme Court of Missouri held that the Missouri Constitution did not allow the state to place anyone on the registry who had been convicted or pleaded guilty to a registrable offense before the sex offender registration law went into effect on 1 January 1995 and remanded the case for further consideration in light of that holding. On remand, the Jackson County Circuit Court entered an injunction ordering that the applicable individuals be removed from the published sex offender list. Defendant Colonel James Keathley appealed that order to the Missouri Court of Appeals in Kansas City, which affirmed the injunction on 1 April 2008. Keathley filed an appeal with the Supreme Court of Missouri.

In response to these rulings, in 2007, several Missouri state Senators proposed an amendment to the Missouri Constitution that would exempt sex offender registration laws from the ban on retrospective civil laws. The proposed amendment passed the State Senate unanimously but was not passed by the Missouri House of Representatives before the end of the 2007 legislative session. The same constitutional amendment was proposed in and passed by the Missouri Senate again in 2008, but also was not passed by the House of Representatives by the end of that year's legislative session. As a result, the decisions of the Missouri courts prohibiting the retrospective application of sex offender laws remained intact.

The Missouri Supreme Court ruled on Keathley's appeal (Doe v. Phillips now styled Doe v. Keathley) on 16 June 2009. The Court held that the Missouri Constitution's provision prohibiting laws retrospective in operation no longer exempts individuals from registration if they are subject to the independent Federal obligation created under the Sexual Offenders Registration and Notification Act (SORNA), 42 U.S.C. § 16913. As a result, many offenders who were previously exempt under the Court's 2006 holding in Doe v. Phillips were once again required to register.

On 12 January 2010, Cole County Circuit Judge Richard Callahan ruled that individuals who plead guilty to a sex offense are not required to register under Federal Law and thus are not required to register in Missouri if the date of their plea was prior to the passage of the Missouri registration law.

=== New York ===
Local governments in New York cannot restrict where registered sex offenders can live, according to a ruling by the state's highest court published 31 May 2015. Under New York law, only level 3 offenders and those on probation or parole are prohibited from being within 1,000 feet of school grounds or a day care center.

=== North Carolina ===
§ 14-202.5 banned use of commercial social networking Web sites by sex offenders. Potentially this means that a registered offender could be charged by authorities for use of Google or other public internet sites. On August 20, 2013, the North Carolina Court of Appeals struck down the law, saying it is too vague, and violates free speech. On August 30, 2013, the NC Supreme Court grants NC Attorney General Roy Cooper's request for a stay of Court of Appeals ruling. That stay was granted but no other outcome from that stay has moved forward. The U.S. Supreme Court struck down this law in Packingham v. North Carolina.

=== Ohio ===
In 2012, the Supreme Court of Ohio found automatic lifetime registration for juveniles to be unconstitutional.

Ohio Supreme Court has also ruled the Ohio version of Adam Walsh Act to be punitive, rather than a civil regulatory measure. This decision barred retroactive application of Ohio's Adam Walsh Act to those whose crimes predated the law's enactment.

=== Pennsylvania ===
In December 2014 the Pennsylvania Supreme Court ruled that Pennsylvania's sex offender registry for juvenile offenders was unconstitutional. In a 5-1 decision, the court concluded that the state, by making an "irrebuttable presumption" about adults' behavior based on crimes they committed as teens, violated their constitutional right to due process.

In July 2017, the Pennsylvania Supreme Court further ruled that Pennsylvania's retroactive application of SORNA penalties violated the ex post facto provisions of both the United States and Pennsylvania Constitution and additionally violated the Pennsylvania Constitutional protected freedom of reputation. As a result, SORNA is currently not enforceable in the State of Pennsylvania.
