= Public urination =

Act of urinating in a public space

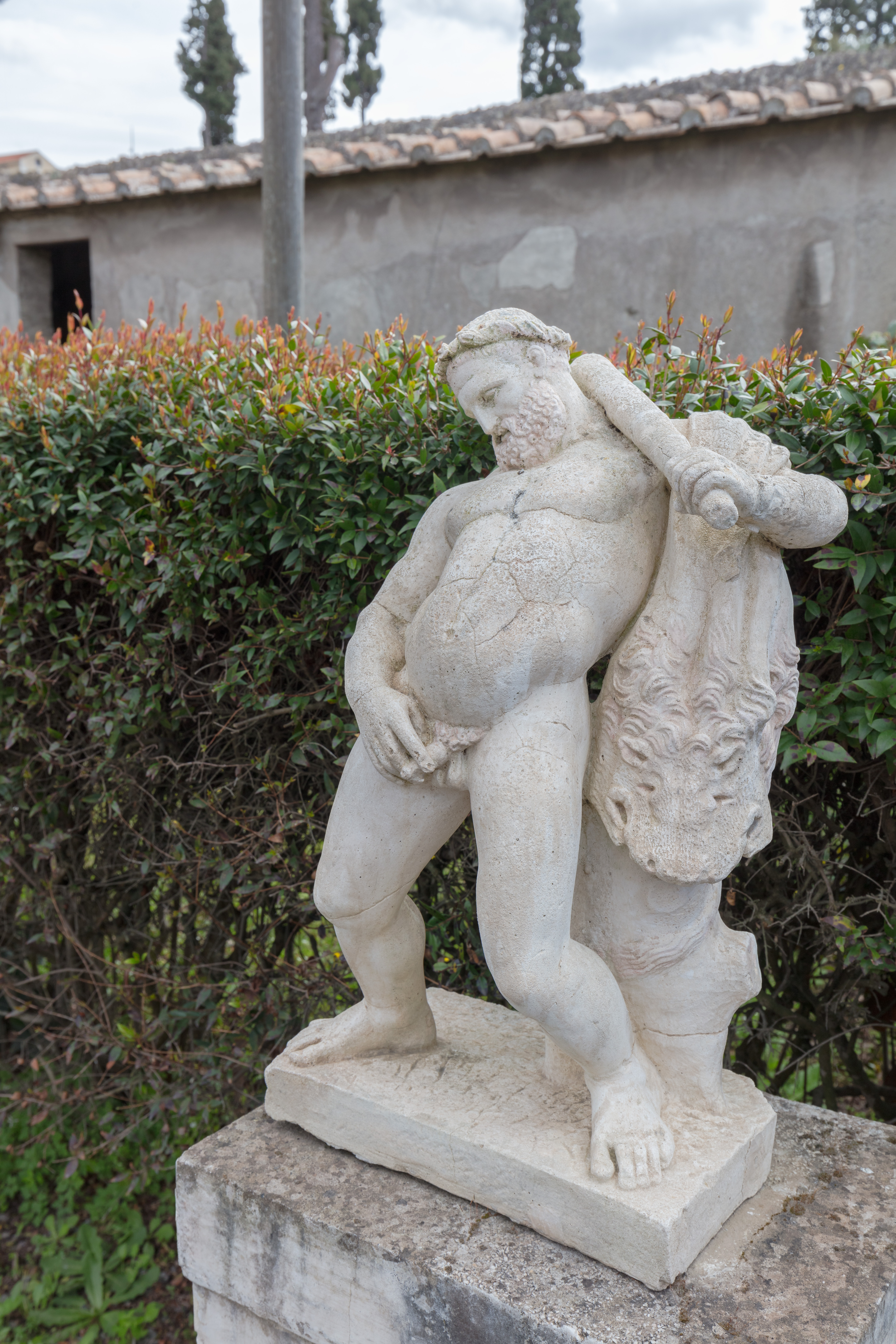
Urinating Uranus, Casa dei Cervi in Herculaneum

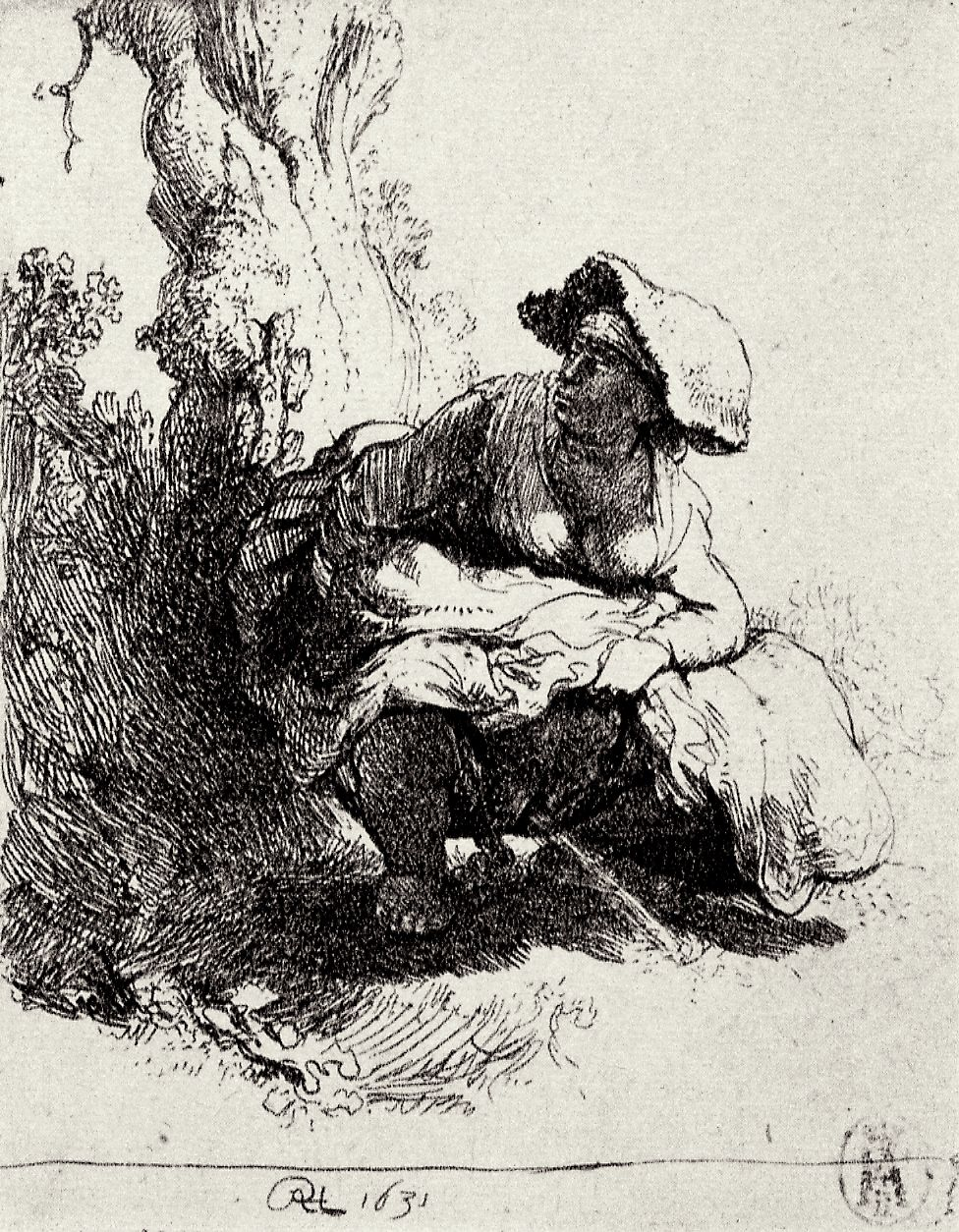
Urinating woman, Rembrandt, 1631

Public urination refers to urinating in a public space without using designated facilities such as toilets or urinals. This includes urinating against trees, lamp posts, house walls, doorways, or gardens. In modern times, public urination is increasingly frowned upon and is penalized in many countries.

== Treatment ==
=== Austria ===
In Austria, public urination is penalized as an indecency offense. In Vienna, a fine of up to 700 euros can be imposed.

=== France ===
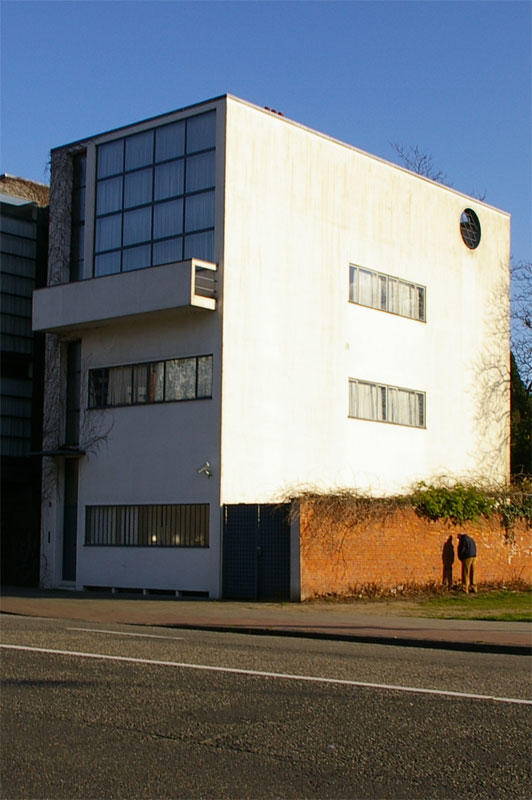
A urinating man relief at Maison Guiette in Antwerp

In Paris, a fine of 68 euros was introduced in 2017. A total of 5,381 men and a few women were fined.

=== Germany ===
Public urination is considered an administrative offense under § 118 of the Ordnungswidrigkeitengesetz, classified as a "public nuisance": "Whoever commits a grossly improper act that is likely to harass or endanger the public and disturb public order." The amount of the fine depends on the penalty catalogues of local authorities.

Some municipalities increase fines for specific occasions, such as Carnival, Oktoberfest, or other public celebrations.

In some cases, public urination can be classified as public indecency, which is a criminal offense under § 183a of the German Criminal Code:

Whoever publicly engages in sexual acts and thereby intentionally or knowingly causes offense shall be punished with imprisonment of up to one year or a fine, unless the act is punishable under § 183."

Minors under the age of 14 are not criminally responsible and can only be reprimanded.

In one case, a man who urinated on a beach at night in July 2022 was acquitted in 2023 by the Lübeck Court because he was only vaguely visible and no one felt harassed:

Since no harassment of the public can be based on shame, contamination, or odor, the act is protected by the general freedom of action under Article 2, Paragraph 1 of the German Constitution and is ultimately a natural human behavior. Humans under the vast sky have no fewer rights than a deer in the forest, a hare in the field, or a seal on the shore of the Baltic Sea."

=== India ===
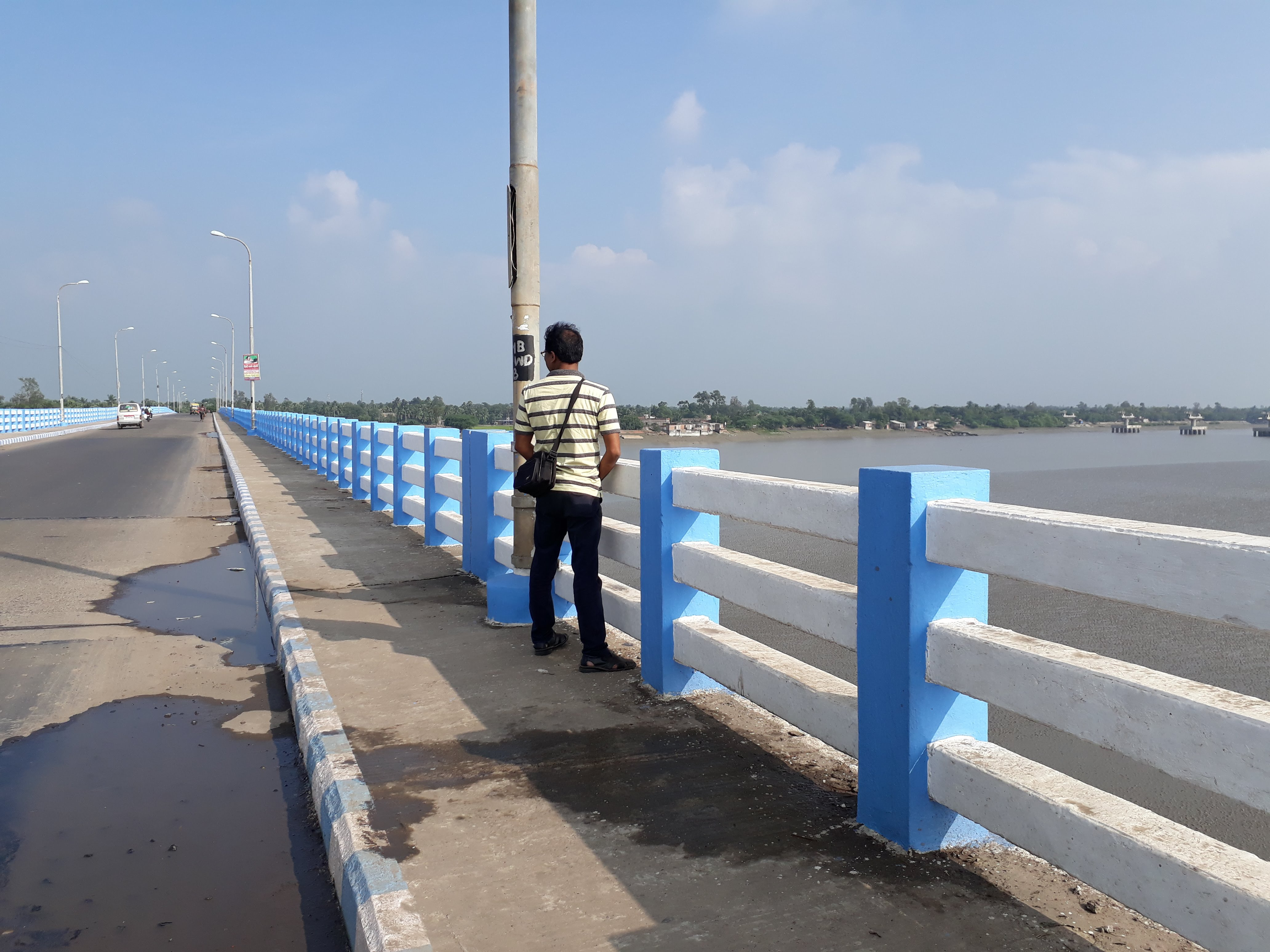
Public urination on a river bridge in India

Public urination is a punishable offense in India under public nuisance laws, primarily Section 292 of the Indian Penal Code (IPC) and in similar section of Bharatiya Nyaya Sanhita (BNS).

=== The Netherlands ===
In The Netherlands, public urination in undesignated places is called "wildplassen." It is prohibited in many places under the APV, The fine for this offense is 160 euros. However, it is often not punishable outside of built-up areas as the local regulations usually only apply to cover the built-up area. Under the Police Penalty Order F 185, "relieving oneself outside a designated facility/place on or near the road within built-up areas".

After years of protests by women convicted of urinating on the street, the city of Amsterdam committed to investing four million euros in public toilets for women.

=== United Kingdom ===
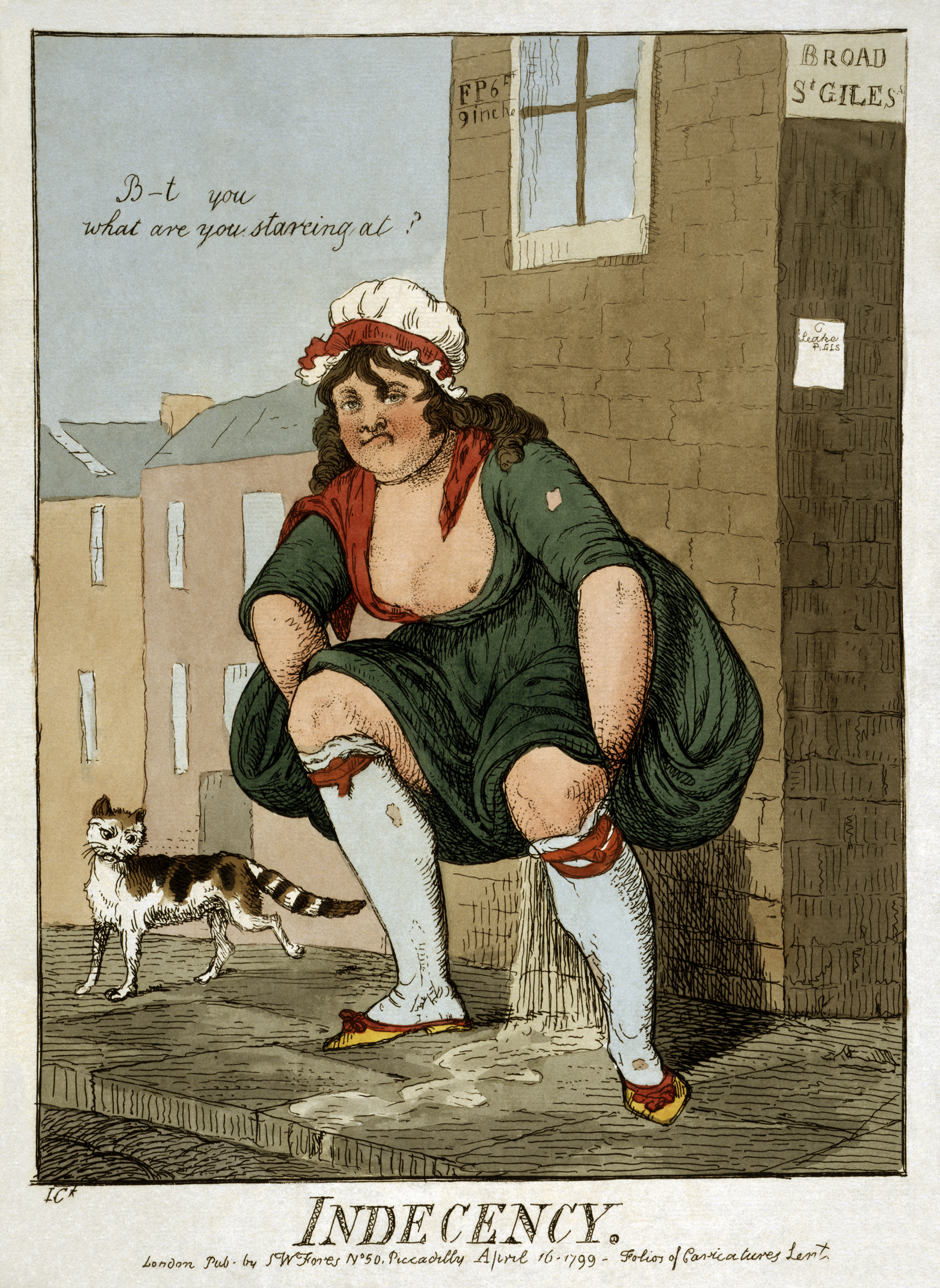
Caricature "Indecency. Blast you, what are you staring at?", April 16, 1799

In England and Wales, "disorderly behavior" related to public urination is punishable under the Public Order Act 1986. At the same time, the UK has seen a significant decline in public toilet facilities.

=== United States ===
While public urination is not explicitly illegal in all U.S. states, it can often fall into various categories and penalties depending on local jurisdiction.

=== Hong Kong SAR ===
Public urination is a summary offence under section 8(1) of the Public Cleansing and Prevention of Nuisances Regulation (Cap 132BK):

"No person shall obey the call of nature—

(a) in any street, public place or place exposed to the public view; or

(b) in any common part of a building other than a toilet or water closet."

The penalty is a fine.
