= Alliance for Constitutional Sex Offense Laws =

Nonprofit civil rights organisation

- Type: Non-profit corporation
- Purpose: Civil rights advocacy, Reforming sex offender registry laws
- Headquarters: Sacramento, California
- Executive Director: Janice Bellucci
- Website: https://all4consolaws.org

Alliance for Constitutional Sex Offense Laws (ACSOL) is a nonprofit civil rights, legal reform, and support organization, in Sacramento, California. ACSOL advocates for the protection of the constitution by restoring the rights of those required to register as sex offenders, and their families. ACSOL was formerly known as California Reform Sex Offender Laws (CA RSOL).

== Activism ==
ACSOL is active in legislation and played a significant role in the recent passage of the Tiered Registry Law, SB 384, which allows some, but not all, registrants to petition for removal from the state's sex offender registry. ACSOL is currently involved in a legislative effort to alter the Tiered Registry Law by changing key provisions of that law that would expand the number of registrants eligible to petition for removal. ACSOL also monitors bills introduced in the legislature that could harm registrants and their families and opposes all such bills.

In addition to its legislative efforts, ACSOL engages in legal battles challenging local Halloween ordinances, and proximity and residency restrictions aimed at registrants in federal court across the state of California. Due to lawsuits, registrants in California who are not on parole or probation are no longer required to post a sign on the front door of their residence on Halloween.

Due to the proximity restrictions lawsuits, registrants in California are currently allowed to visit public and private places throughout the state. In 2015, ACSOL began a series of lawsuits in state of California soon after the California Supreme Court ruled San Diego residency restrictions unconstitutional. As of August, more than 100 lawsuits have been filed across the state.

ACSOL is currently serving as a plaintiff in a lawsuit challenging federal SORNA regulations that places significant burdens on registrants, such as requiring some registrants to register more than once a year although state law only requires annual registration. The lawsuit was initiated by the Pacific Legal Foundation in federal district court. The judge in that case has issued a preliminary injunction that prohibits the federal government from enforcing the regulations in the state of California.

In 2016 ACSOL participated in a challenge to the International Megan's Law (IML), passed by Congress and signed into law by President Obama, in February 2016. The lawsuit was filed on February 9, 2016, but was dismissed by the United States District Court.

== See also ==
- National Association for Rational Sexual Offense Laws
- Women Against Registry
- Illinois Voices for Reform
