= Association for the Treatment and Prevention of Sexual Abuse =

American non-profit organization

The Association for the Treatment and Prevention of Sexual Abuse (ATSA) is an international, multi-disciplinary, non-profit organization with a stated goal of making society safer by preventing sexual abuse. ATSA promotes sound research, evidence-based practice, informed public policy, and collaborative community strategies that lead to the effective assessment, treatment, and management of individuals who sexually abuse or are at risk to abuse. ATSA sets ethical and practice standards for treatment providers, and provides referrals. The association was incorporated in 1985 and has its headquarters in Beaverton, Oregon, United States.

== Description ==
ATSA is an international organization of more than 3,000 members in approximately 20 countries. Chapters are located throughout the United States and in Utrecht, Netherlands. Members include researchers, treatment providers, corrections officials, attorneys, law enforcement officers, and students. It is focused on the prevention of sexual abuse through effective treatment and management of sex offenders.

ATSA hosts the world's largest annual conference and leading educational venue for individuals working on issues related to the research, treatment, and management of sexual abuse. Conference locations vary each year.

In 2022, the organization changed its name from the "Association for the Treatment of Sexual Abusers" to the "Association for the Treatment and Prevention of Sexual Abuse".

== Publications ==
The official journal of ATSA is Sexual Abuse, produced eight times a year.

According to the Institute for Scientific Information, the peer-reviewed journal's 2018 impact factor was 3.433, ranking among the top 58 tracked journals in criminology and penology.

The journal typically receives 100–150 manuscript submissions annually from researchers and practitioners in 25–30 countries and has an acceptance rate of approximately 25 percent.

== See also ==
- List of sexology organizations
