= 2006 United States House of Representatives election ratings =

Predictions for select races in the 2006 U.S. House elections

The 2006 United States House of Representatives elections were held on November 7, 2006, with early voting taking place in some states in the weeks preceding that date. Voters chose representatives from all 435 congressional districts across each of the 50 U.S. states. Non-voting delegates from the District of Columbia and three of the four inhabited U.S. territories were also elected. These elections took place halfway through the second term of Republican President George W. Bush. The winners served in the 110th United States Congress, with seats apportioned among the states based on the 2000 United States census. On Election Day, Republicans had held a House majority since January 1995 as a result of the 2006 elections.

== Summary of analyses ==
Below is a table summarizing various non-partisan election analyses. Although the nomenclature varies slightly, the categories can be understood as follows:
"Safe" — the race was not expected to become competitive.
"Favored" — the race was not competitive, but might become competitive if new political factors intervened.
"Leans" — the race was competitive, but one candidate had a clear advantage.
"Tossup" — neither candidate had a clear advantage.

Source	Safe Democratic	Democratic Favored	Leans Democratic	Tossup	Leans Republican	Republican Favored	Safe Republican
CQPolitics.com as of Nov 6	182 Democratic Seats	16 Democratic seats 1 Republican seat	5 Democratic seats 9 Republican seats	23 Republican seats	20 Republican seats	22 Republican seats	157 Republican seats
Cook Political Report as of Nov 6	182 Democratic Seats	13 Democratic seats	6 Democratic seats 5 Republican seats	1 Democratic seat 38 Republican seats	12 Republican seats	13 Republican seats	165 Republican seats
Larry Sabato's Crystal Ball as of Nov 6 (← and → show trends)	193 Democratic seats	6 Democratic seats 1→ 3 Republican seats	4 Democratic seats 1→ 26 Republican seats ←5	(none)	31 Republican seats ←10 - 3→	10 Republican seats	162 Republican seats
Majority Watch (final) as of Oct 30	198 seats	24 seats	18 seats	2 seats	10 seats	6 seats	177 seats
Rothenberg Political Report (← and → show trends) as of Nov. 6	197 Democratic seats	1 Democratic seat 3 Republican seats	1 Democratic seats 6 Republican seats	3 Democratic seats ←3; 37 Republican seats ←8 10→	3 Republican seats	8 Republican seats	166 Republican seats
Electoral-vote.com as of Nov. 6	203 Democratic seats 36 Republican seats			1 Republican seat	195 Republican seats		
Ed Fitzgerald's survey of polls as of Nov. 6	227 seats			4 seats	204 seats		

== Election ratings ==
The following table rates the competitiveness of selected races from around the country according to noted political analysts. Races not included should be considered safe for the incumbent's party.

District	CPVI	Incumbent	Previous result	Cook November 6, 2006	Rothenberg November 6, 2006	Sabato November 6, 2006	RCP November 6, 2006	CQ Politics November 7, 2006	Winner
Arizona 1	R+2	Rick Renzi (R)	58.54% R	Tossup	Tilt R	Tilt R	Lean R	Tossup	Rick Renzi (R)
Arizona 5	R+4	J. D. Hayworth (R)	59.50% R	Tossup	Tilt D (flip)	Tilt D (flip)	Tossup	Tossup	Harry Mitchell (D)
Arizona 8	R+1	Jim Kolbe (R) (retiring)	60.36% R	Lean D (flip)	Likely D (flip)	Likely D (flip)	Lean D (flip)	Likely D (flip)	Gabby Giffords (D)
California 4	R+11	John Doolittle (R)	65.39% R	Lean R	Tilt R	Lean R	Lean R	Lean R	John Doolittle (R)
California 11	R+3	Richard Pombo (R)	61.23% R	Tossup	Tossup	Tilt D (flip)	Tossup	Lean R	Jerry McNerney (D)
California 50	R+5	Brian Bilbray (R)	49.30% R	Lean R	Likely R	Lean R	Safe R	Lean R	Brian Bilbray (R)
Colorado 3	R+6	John Salazar (D)	50.55% D	Likely D	Safe D	Safe D	Safe D	Likely D	John Salazar (D)
Colorado 4	R+9	Marilyn Musgrave (R)	51.05% R	Tossup	Tilt R	Tilt D (flip)	Lean R	Lean R	Marilyn Musgrave (R)
Colorado 5	R+16	Joel Hefley (R) (retiring)	70.54% R	Lean R	Likely R	Lean R	Safe R	Likely R	Doug Lamborn (R)
Colorado 6	R+10	Tom Tancredo (R)	59.48% R	Safe R	Safe R	Likely R	Safe R	Safe R	Tom Tancredo (R)
Colorado 7	D+2	Bob Beauprez (R) (retiring) (Note: Retired to run for Governor)	54.72% R	Lean D (flip)	Likely D (flip)	Likely D (flip)	Lean D (flip)	Lean D (flip)	Ed Perlmutter (D)
Connecticut 2	D+8	Rob Simmons (R)	54.22% R	Tossup	Tossup	Tilt D (flip)	Lean R	Lean R	Joe Courtney (D)
Connecticut 4	D+5	Chris Shays (R)	52.43% R	Tossup	Tossup	Tilt D (flip)	Tossup	Tossup	Chris Shays (R)
Connecticut 5	D+4	Nancy Johnson (R)	59.79% R	Tossup	Tilt D (flip)	Tilt D (flip)	Tossup	Tossup	Chris Murphy (D)
Florida 8	R+3	Ric Keller (R)	60.52% R	Likely R	Safe R	Likely R	Safe R	Likely R	Ric Keller (R)
Florida 9	R+4	Michael Bilirakis (R)	100.00% R	Likely R	Safe R	Likely R	Safe R	Likely R	Gus Bilirakis (R)
Florida 13	R+4	Katherine Harris (R) (retiring) (Note: Retired to run for senate)	55.30% R	Tossup	Tilt D (flip)	Lean D (flip)	Tossup	Tossup	Vern Buchanan (R)
Florida 16	R+2	Vacant (Note: Incumbent Mark Foley (Republican) resigned in September 2006, seat left vacant until the next congress.)	68.04% R	Tossup	Tossup	Tilt D (flip)	Lean D (flip)	Lean D (flip)	Tim Mahoney (D)
Florida 22	D+4	Clay Shaw (R)	62.79% R	Tossup	Tossup	Tilt D (flip)	Lean R	Tossup	Ron Klein (D)
Georgia 8	R+8	Jim Marshall (D)	62.88% D	Lean D	Tilt D	Lean D	Tossup	Lean D	Jim Marshall (D)
Georgia 12	D+2	John Barrow (D)	51.81% D	Likely D	Tilt D	Tilt D	Tossup	Lean D	John Barrow (D)
Idaho 1	R+19	Butch Otter (R) (retiring)	69.55% R	Tossup	Tilt R	Tilt D (flip)	Lean R	Lean R	Bill Sali (R)
Illinois 6	R+3	Henry Hyde (R) (retiring)	55.83% R	Tossup	Tossup	Tilt D (flip)	Tossup	Tossup	Peter Roskam (R)
Illinois 8	R+5	Melissa Bean (D)	51.70% D	Lean D	Tilt D	Lean D	Lean D	Lean D	Melissa Bean (D)
Illinois 10	D+4	Mark Kirk (R)	64.14% R	Likely R	Safe R	Lean R	Safe R	Likely R	Mark Kirk (R)
Illinois 17	D+5	Lane Evans (D) (retiring)	60.68% D	Likely D	Safe D	Safe D	Safe D	Likely D	Phil Hare (D)
Indiana 2	R+4	Chris Chocola (R)	54.17% R	Tossup	Lean D (flip)	Lean D (flip)	Tossup	Tossup	Joe Donnelly (D)
Indiana 3	R+16	Mark Souder (R)	69.21% R	Likely R	Safe R	Likely R	Safe R	Likely R	Mark Souder (R)
Indiana 7	D+9	Julia Carson (D)	54.35% D	Likely D	Safe D	Likely D	Lean D	Likely D	Julia Carson (D)
Indiana 8	R+9	John Hostettler (R)	53.37% R	Tossup	Likely D (flip)	Likely D (flip)	Lean D (flip)	Lean D (flip)	Brad Ellsworth (D)
Indiana 9	R+7	Mike Sodrel (R)	49.46% R	Tossup	Tilt D (flip)	Tilt D (flip)	Tossup	Tossup	Baron Hill (D)
Iowa 1	D+5	Jim Nussle (R) (retiring)	55.18% R	Lean D (flip)	Lean D (flip)	Lean D (flip)	Lean D (flip)	Lean D (flip)	Bruce Braley (D)
Iowa 2	D+7	Jim Leach (R)	58.96% R	Likely R	Safe R	Lean R	Safe R	Likely R	Dave Loebsack (D)
Iowa 3	D+1	Leonard Boswell (D)	55.25% D	Lean D	Lean D	Lean D	Lean D	Lean D	Leonard Boswell (D)
Kansas 2	R+7	Jim Ryun (R)	56.15% R	Tossup	Tossup	Tilt R	Safe R	Likely R	Nancy Boyda (D)
Kansas 3	R+4	Dennis Moore (D)	54.82% D	Likely D	Safe D	Safe D	Safe D	Likely D	Dennis Moore (D)
Kentucky 2	R+13	Ron Lewis (R)	67.92% R	Lean R	Likely R	Lean R	Safe R	Lean R	Ron Lewis (R)
Kentucky 3	D+2	Anne Northup (R)	60.26% R	Tossup	Tilt R	Tilt R	Tossup	Lean R	John Yarmuth (D)
Kentucky 4	R+12	Geoff Davis (R)	54.40% R	Lean R	Tilt R	Tilt D (flip)	Lean R	Lean R	Geoff Davis (R)
Louisiana 2	D+28	William Jefferson (D)	79.01% D	Likely D	Safe D	Safe D	Safe D	Safe D	William Jefferson (D)
Louisiana 3	R+5	Charlie Melançon (D)	50.25% D	Lean D	Safe D	Likely D	Safe D	Likely D	Charlie Melançon (D)
Louisiana 7	R+7	Charles Boustany (R)	54.96% R	Safe R	Safe R	Safe R	Safe R	Likely R	Charles Boustany (R)
Maryland 3	D+7	Ben Cardin (D) (retiring)	63.44% D	Safe D	Safe D	Safe D	Safe D	Likely D	John Sarbanes (D)
Maryland 6	R+13	Roscoe Bartlett (R)	67.45% R	Safe R	Safe R	Safe R	Safe R	Likely R	Roscoe Bartlett (R)
Michigan 7	R+2	Joe Schwarz (R) (lost renomination)	58.36% R	Likely R	Safe R	Likely R	Safe R	Likely R	Tim Walberg (R)
Michigan 8	R+2	Mike Rogers (R)	61.08% R	Safe R	Safe R	Safe R	Safe R	Likely R	Mike Rogers (R)
Minnesota 1	R+1	Gil Gutknecht (R)	59.65% R	Tossup	Tossup	Tilt R	Lean R	Lean R	Tim Walz (D)
Minnesota 2	R+3	John Kline (R)	56.42% R	Safe R	Safe R	Likely R	Safe R	Likely R	John Kline (R)
Minnesota 6	R+5	Mark Kennedy (R) (retiring)	54.03% R	Tossup	Tossup	Tilt R	Lean R	Tossup	Michele Bachmann (R)
Nebraska 1	R+11	Jeff Fortenberry (R)	54.23% R	Safe R	Safe R	Safe R	Safe R	Lean R	Jeff Fortenberry (R)
Nebraska 3	R+24	Tom Osborne (R) (retiring)	87.45% R	Lean R	Likely R	Tilt R	Safe R	Lean R	Adrian Smith (R)
Nevada 2	R+8	Jim Gibbons (R) (retiring)	66.15% R	Lean R	Likely R	Lean R	Lean R	Lean R	Dean Heller (R)
Nevada 3	D+1	Jon Porter (R)	54.46% R	Tossup	Tilt R	Tilt R	Lean R	Lean R	Jon Porter (R)
New Hampshire 1	Even	Jeb Bradley (R)	63.40% R	Likely R	Safe R	Likely R	Safe R	Likely R	Carol Shea-Porter (D)
New Hampshire 2	D+3	Charles Bass (R)	58.33% R	Tossup	Tilt D (flip)	Tilt D (flip)	Tossup	Tossup	Paul Hodes (D)
New Jersey 5	R+4	Scott Garrett (R)	57.57% R	Safe R	Safe R	Safe R	Safe R	Likely R	Scott Garrett (R)
New Jersey 7	R+1	Mike Ferguson (R)	56.88% R	Lean R	Lean R	Lean R	Safe R	Lean R	Mike Ferguson (R)
New Mexico 1	D+2	Heather Wilson (R)	54.44% R	Tossup	Tossup	Tilt D (flip)	Tossup	Tossup	Heather Wilson (R)
New York 3	D+2	Peter King (R)	62.96% R	Likely R	Likely R	Likely R	Safe R	Likely R	Peter King (R)
New York 13	D+1	Vito Fossella (R)	58.99% R	Safe R	Safe R	Safe R	Safe R	Likely R	Vito Fossella (R)
New York 19	R+1	Sue Kelly (R)	66.74% R	Lean R	Likely R	Tilt R	Lean R	Lean R	John Hall (D)
New York 20	R+3	John E. Sweeney (R)	65.83% R	Tossup	Tilt D (flip)	Tilt D (flip)	Lean D (flip)	Tossup	Kirsten Gillibrand (D)
New York 24	R+1	Sherwood Boehlert (R) (retiring)	56.89% R	Lean D (flip)	Tilt D (flip)	Lean D (flip)	Lean D (flip)	Tossup	Mike Arcuri (D)
New York 25	D+3	James T. Walsh (R)	90.39% R	Lean R	Tilt R	Tilt R	Lean R	Lean R	James T. Walsh (R)
New York 26	R+3	Thomas M. Reynolds (R)	55.63% R	Tossup	Tossup	Tilt R	Lean R	Lean D (flip)	Thomas M. Reynolds (R)
New York 29	R+5	Randy Kuhl (R)	50.66% R	Lean R	Tilt R	Lean R	Lean R	Lean R	Randy Kuhl (R)
North Carolina 8	R+3	Robin Hayes (R)	55.54% R	Likely R	Safe R	Lean R	Safe R	Likely R	Robin Hayes (R)
North Carolina 11	R+7	Charles Taylor (R)	54.90% R	Lean D (flip)	Tilt D (flip)	Lean D (flip)	Lean D (flip)	Tossup	Heath Shuler (D)
North Carolina 13	D+2	Brad Miller (D)	58.79% D	Safe D	Safe D	Safe D	Safe D	Likely D	Brad Miller (D)
Ohio 1	R+1	Steve Chabot (R)	59.87% R	Tossup	Tossup	Tilt R	Tossup	Tossup	Steve Chabot (R)
Ohio 2	R+13	Jean Schmidt (R)	51.63% R	Tossup	Tossup	Tilt D (flip)	Tossup	Tossup	Jean Schmidt (R)
Ohio 6	Even	Ted Strickland (D) (retiring)	100.00% D	Likely D	Safe D	Likely D	Safe D	Likely D	Charlie Wilson (D)
Ohio 12	R+1	Pat Tiberi (R)	61.96% R	Likely R	Lean R	Likely R	Safe R	Likely R	Pat Tiberi (R)
Ohio 13	D+6	Sherrod Brown (D) (retiring)	67.43% D	Likely D	Safe D	Safe D	Safe D	Likely D	Betty Sutton (D)
Ohio 15	R+1	Deborah Pryce (R)	60.02% R	Tossup	Lean D (flip)	Tilt D (flip)	Lean D (flip)	Tossup	Deborah Pryce (R)
Ohio 18	R+6	Vacant (Note: Incumbent Bob Ney (Republican) resigned in November 2006, seat left vacant until the next congress.)	66.16% R	Lean D (flip)	Lean D (flip)	Lean D (flip)	Lean D (flip)	Lean D (flip)	Zack Space (D)
Oregon 5	D+1	Darlene Hooley (D)	52.86% D	Likely D	Safe D	Safe D	Safe D	Likely D	Darlene Hooley (D)
Pennsylvania 4	R+3	Melissa Hart (R)	63.08% R	Tossup	Tossup	Tilt R	Lean R	Lean R	Jason Altmire (D)
Pennsylvania 6	D+2	Jim Gerlach (R)	51.01% R	Tossup	Tossup	Lean D (flip)	Tossup	Tossup	Jim Gerlach (R)
Pennsylvania 7	D+4	Curt Weldon (R)	58.76% R	Tossup	Lean D (flip)	Lean D (flip)	Lean D (flip)	Lean D (flip)	Joe Sestak (D)
Pennsylvania 8	D+3	Mike Fitzpatrick (R)	55.31% R	Tossup	Tossup	Tilt R	Lean R	Tossup	Patrick Murphy (D)
Pennsylvania 10	R+8	Don Sherwood (R)	92.84% R	Tossup	Lean D (flip)	Lean D (flip)	Lean D (flip)	Lean D (flip)	Chris Carney (D)
South Carolina 5	R+6	John Spratt (D)	63.05% D	Likely D	Safe D	Safe D	Safe D	Likely D	John Spratt (D)
Texas 17	R+18	Chet Edwards (D)	51.20% D	Likely D	Safe D	Likely D	Safe D	Likely D	Chet Edwards (D)
Texas 22	R+15	Vacant (Note: Incumbent Tom DeLay (Republican) resigned in June 2006, Shelley Sekula-Gibbs (R) won a simultaneous special election to fill the remainder of DeLay's term.)	55.16% R	Tossup	Tossup	Tilt D (flip)	Lean D (flip)	Lean D (flip)	Nick Lampson (D)
Texas 23	R+4	Henry Bonilla (R)	69.26% R	Lean R	Lean R	Lean R	Safe R	Likely R	Ciro Rodriguez (D)
Utah 2	R+17	Jim Matheson (D)	54.76% D	Likely D	Safe D	Safe D	Safe D	Likely D	Jim Matheson (D)
Vermont at-large	D+8	Bernie Sanders (I) (retiring)	67.46% I	Lean D (flip)	Likely D (flip)	Likely D (flip)	Lean D (flip)	Lean D (flip)	Peter Welch (D)
Virginia 2	R+6	Thelma Drake (R)	55.14% R	Tossup	Tossup	Tilt R	Lean R	Lean R	Thelma Drake (R)
Virginia 11	R+5	Frank Wolf (R)	63.25% R	Likely R	Safe R	Lean R	Safe R	Likely R	Frank Wolf (R)
Washington 2	D+3	Rick Larsen (D)	63.91 D	Likely D	Safe D	Safe D	Safe D	Likely D	Rick Larsen (D)
Washington 5	R+7	Cathy McMorris (R)	59.68% R	Likely R	Safe R	Lean R	Safe R	Likely R	Cathy McMorris (R)
Washington 8	D+2	Dave Reichert (R)	51.50% R	Lean R	Tilt R	Tilt R	Lean R	Tossup	Dave Reichert (R)
West Virginia 1	R+6	Alan Mollohan (D)	67.78% D	Likely D	Safe D	Likely D	Safe D	Likely D	Alan Mollohan (D)
West Virginia 2	R+5	Shelley Moore Capito (R)	57.46% R	Likely R	Safe R	Likely R	Safe R	Likely R	Shelley Moore Capito (R)
Wisconsin 8	Even	Mark Green (R) (retiring)	70.16% R	Tossup	Tossup	Tilt R	Lean R	Tossup	Steve Kagen (D)
Wyoming at-large	R+19	Barbara Cubin (R)	55.32% R	Tossup	Likely R	Tilt R	Safe R	Tossup	Barbara Cubin (R)
Overall				D - 207; R - 189; 39 tossups	D - 220; R - 196; 19 tossups	D - 233; R - 202	D - 214; R - 205; 16 tossups	D - 213; R - 199; 23 tossups	D - 233; R - 202

== Polling map - November 6, 2006 ==
The map below shows the latest polling information as of November 6, 2006, for House races. No party polls included. Darker colors indicate stronger support. Where no polls were available, last year's election results were used. If two polls tied for most recent, the longer poll was used.

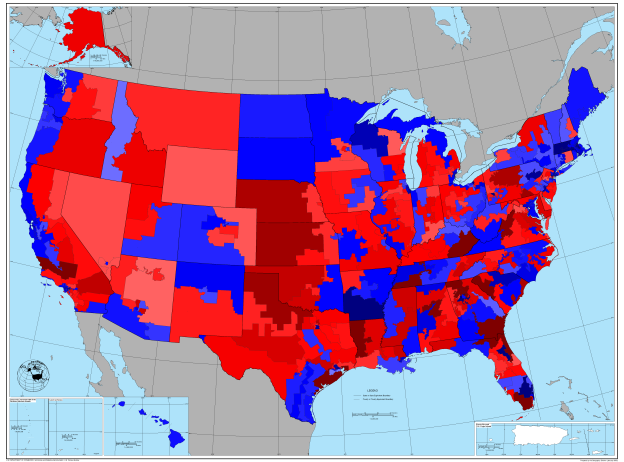
