= Ted Van Der Meid =

Theodore J. Van Der Meid (born September 1, 1955, and died March 19, 2018), was Counsel/Director of Floor Operations, Office of the Speaker, serving Speaker Dennis Hastert in the United States Congress. He has joined the law firm of McKenna Long & Aldridge, to handle issues relating to ethics, Congressional investigations and compliance.

== Counsel/Director of Floor Operations ==
As Counsel/Director of Floor Operations, he coordinated all legal and ethical issues for the Speaker. He also worked with the House Counsel, Legislative Counsel, Law Revision Counsel, and Parliamentarian. As Director of Floor Operations for the Speaker, he oversaw the daily operations of the House floor working with the Majority Leader's Office, Majority Whip's Office, and the House Rules Committee. He also coordinated all institutional operations of the House on behalf of the Speaker working with the Clerk, Chief Administrative Officer, Sergeant at Arms, Office of Emergency Planning, Preparedness, and Operations, the Architect of the Capitol and well as contingency operations of the House. He also advised the Speaker on committee assignments for Republican Members.

In addition, he was Staff Director and Chief Counsel to the House Committee on Standards of Official Conduct (House Ethics Committee), General Counsel to the Office of Republican Leader, Robert Michel (R-IL), Legislative Director to Rep. Jan Meyers (R-KS), and Budget Associate to Rep. Lynn Martin (R-IL).

== Controversies ==
=== Gingrich ===
In the mid-1990s, Van Der Meid was Chief Counsel to the committee investigating inconsistent statements by Newt Gingrich.

=== Congressional Security and Corruption Probe ===
According to Congressional Quarterly, in 2005 Van Der Meid blocked investigators looking into possible mismanagement, including bid rigging and kickbacks, at a secret service office. Congressional Quarterly reported:

Ronald Garant and a second Appropriations Committee investigator who asked not to be identified said Van Der Meid engaged in "screaming matches" with investigators and told at least one aide not to talk to them. Van Der Meid also prohibited investigators from visiting certain sites to check up on the effectiveness of the work, the investigators said.

=== Mark Foley scandal ===
Van Der Meid is alleged to be one of the subjects in the office of Dennis Hastert who were told about the activities of Mark Foley in the Mark Foley congressional page incident.

== See also ==
- House Office Building Commission
- Scott B. Palmer
- Timothy M. Kennedy (politician)
