= Tom Rooney (Florida politician) =

American politician (born 1970)

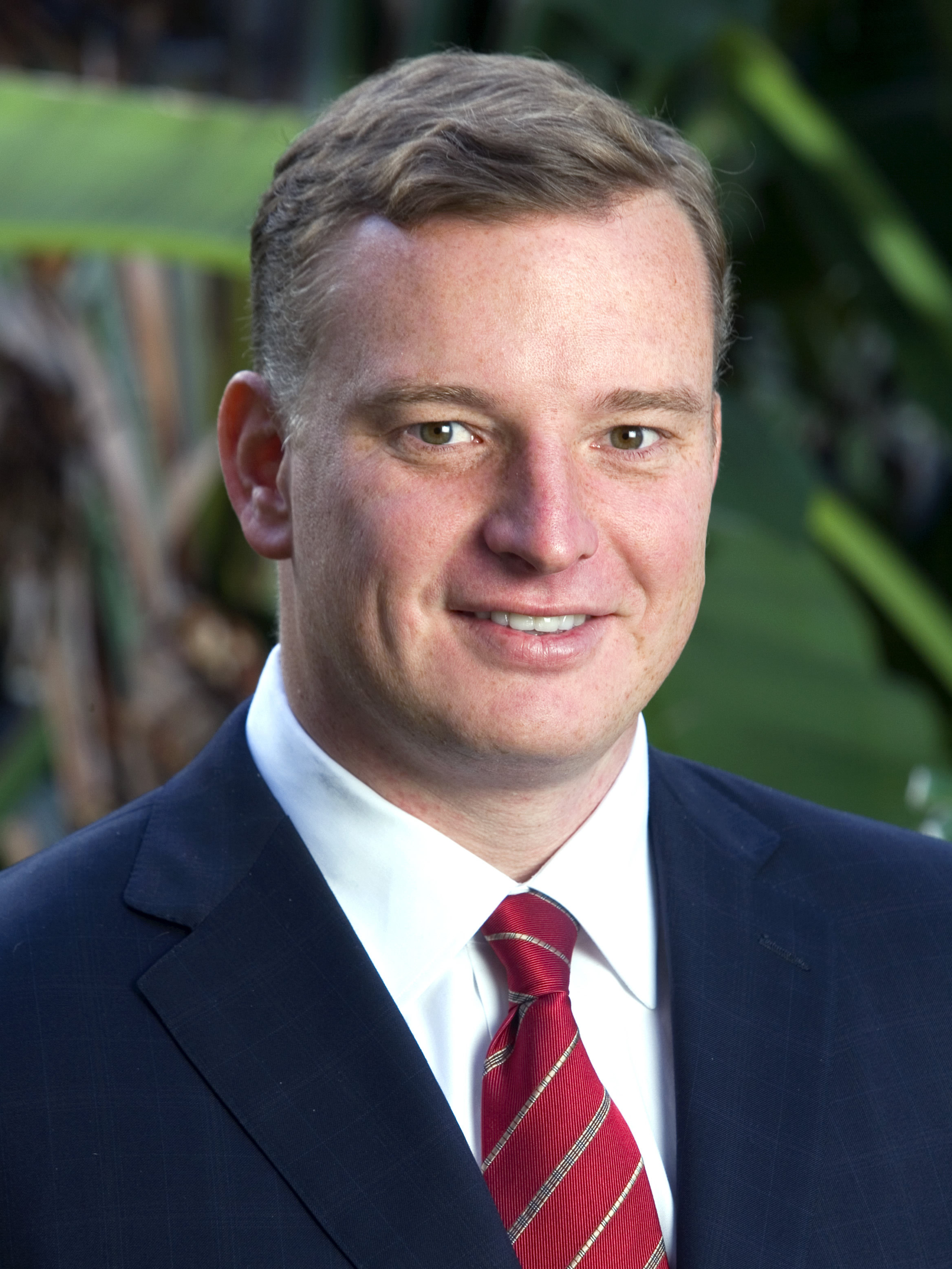
- Official portrait, 2009

Member of the U.S. House of Representatives from Florida
- In office January 3, 2009 – January 3, 2019
- Preceded by: Tim Mahoney
- Succeeded by: Greg Steube
- Constituency: 16th district (2009–2013); 17th district (2013–2019)

Personal details
- Born: Thomas Joseph Rooney; November 21, 1970 (age 55) Philadelphia, Pennsylvania, U.S.
- Party: Republican
- Spouse: Tara Lombardi (m. 1997)
- Children: 3
- Relatives: Art Rooney (grandfather); Kate Mara (cousin); Rooney Mara (cousin)
- Education: Syracuse University (attended); Washington and Jefferson College (BA); University of Florida (MA); University of Miami (JD)

Military service
- Branch/service: United States Army
- Years of service: 2000–2004 (active); 2004–2008 (reserve)
- Rank: Captain
- Unit: Army Judge Advocate General's Corps
- Awards: Army Commendation Medal (2)

Thomas Joseph Rooney (born November 21, 1970) is an American politician who served as a U.S. representative from Florida from 2009 to 2019. He represented Florida's 16th congressional district from 2009 to 2013 and Florida's 17th congressional district from 2013 to 2019. He is a member of the Republican Party.

Rooney announced in February 2018 that he would retire from Congress and would not seek re-election in 2018.

He serves as President and Chief Executive Officer of the National Thoroughbred Racing Association.

== Early life and education ==
Rooney was born in Philadelphia, Pennsylvania. When Tom was 14, his father, Patrick J. Rooney Sr., moved with the family to Palm Beach Gardens, Florida where they owned a dog track and gambling business.

He graduated from the Benjamin School in North Palm Beach, Florida in 1989. In college, Rooney played football for Syracuse University and Washington & Jefferson College outside Pittsburgh where he earned his B.A. in English Literature. He was a member of Lambda Chi Alpha fraternity.

Rooney attended the University of Florida, where he received an M.A. in Political Science. He attended the University of Miami School of Law, where he received his J.D. and met his wife, Tara Lombardi. They became members of The Florida Bar in 1999.

He is not related to fellow Republican representative Francis Rooney.

== Military career ==
After law school, both Rooney and his wife joined the U.S. Army JAG Corps. In 2001, Tom and Tara, along with their newborn son, were stationed at Fort Hood on 9/11. Rooney spent more than four years on Active Duty in the United States Army JAG Corps. He served as Special Assistant U.S Attorney at Fort Hood in Texas, prosecuting all civilian crimes on post. Rooney also served in the 1st Cavalry Division.

In 2002, Rooney began teaching Constitutional and Criminal Law as an Asst. Prof. in the Dept. of Law at the United States Military Academy at West Point, New York. He received two Army Commendation Medals for his service. Tom and Tara Rooney each completed active duty with the rank of captain.

During his active duty time in the JAG Corps, he served with fellow future Congressman Patrick Murphy, a Democrat from Pennsylvania who was the first Iraq War veteran elected to the U.S. Congress.

== Early political career ==
As his first job out of college, Tom Rooney worked for U.S. Senator Connie Mack III, who had worked with Tom's father, Patrick J. Rooney Sr., at one time. Rooney started in Senator Mack's mailroom: "We opened every letter and that's where I learned what people's issues were. It really helped shape a blank slate in my life." After getting his Master's degree, he returned to Florida, where he went to work as an Assistant Attorney General. While working as a criminal prosecutor for Attorney General Charlie Crist, he joined the Board of Directors with "The Children's Place at Home Safe," a Palm Beach County shelter that helps abused, neglected, and abandoned children. In 2005, Rooney was named CEO of Home Safe; because of his work there, Governor Jeb Bush appointed him to the Children's Services Council of Palm Beach County Board of Directors in January 2006. After his second year as director, Rooney returned to the Board of Directors of Children's Place and resumed his practice of law in Stuart, Florida with the law firm of Kramer, Sopko & Levenstein, P.A. He is a graduate of Leadership Palm Beach County.

== U.S. House of Representatives ==
=== Elections ===
2008

Rooney challenged Democratic incumbent Tim Mahoney. Mahoney had narrowly won the Republican-leaning district in 2006, after five-term incumbent Mark Foley abruptly resigned under a cloud of scandal. Since Foley resigned a little more than a month before the election, Florida election law required Foley's name to remain on the general election ballot, with votes for him being transferred to his replacement, State Representative Joe Negron. It was widely believed that this significantly undermined Negron's chances, as many voters would be reluctant to cast a ballot in Foley's name.

Given Mahoney's narrow margin of victory, coupled with the unusual circumstances surrounding the 2006 election and this district's Republican bent, the 16th District was viewed as one of Republicans' best opportunities to take a congressional seat from the Democrats in 2008. In the Republican Party primary, Rooney was endorsed by Florida's Governor, Charlie Crist, and defeated State Representative Gayle Harrell and investment banker Hal Valeche. Mahoney, aided by incumbency and having burnished his image as a moderate Blue Dog Democrat, consistently led Rooney in polls throughout the 2008 election cycle until mid-October 2008, when it was revealed that Mahoney, who had promoted a family values image and campaigned against corruption in contrast to the disgraced Foley, had engaged in multiple extramarital affairs and secretly paid off his mistresses to conceal them. This revelation shifted the race decisively in Rooney's favor, even causing the Palm Beach Post to take the rare step of rescinding its previous endorsement of Mahoney and endorsing Rooney instead.

2010

Rooney ran unopposed in the Republican primary. In the general election, he defeated Democratic nominee Jim Horn and write-in candidate William Dean.

2012

For his first two terms, Rooney represented a district stretching from the Treasure Coast through the Everglades to Port Charlotte on the other side of the state. Redistricting, however, saw the 16th renumbered as the 18th District and made significantly more compact. It lost most of its heavily Republican western portion to the new 17th District, which stretched from the Everglades to the outer suburbs of Tampa. Rooney opted to run for reelection in the 17th. He retained roughly one-third of his previous constituents. Most of them lived in the western portion of the old 16th. He sold his home in Tequesta, which remained in the 18th, and bought a home in Okeechobee as his official residence in the new 17th.

In the August 14 Republican primary—the real contest in this heavily Republican district—Rooney faced Joe Arnold, a Republican state committeeman for Okeechobee County and member of the school board. Rooney defeated Arnold in a landslide, getting 74% of vote. Rooney ran in the general election against a retired airline pilot, Democrat William Bronson (formerly an unsuccessful Republican candidate in Massachusetts and Georgia) as well as Socialist Workers Party write-in candidate Tom Baumann (who ran unsuccessful campaigns in Minnesota and Manhattan).

Rooney received endorsements in Florida from Agriculture Commissioner Adam Putnam, U.S. Sen. Marco Rubio, U.S. Reps. Allen West and Dennis A. Ross as well as from the NRA Political Victory Fund. In their Saturday, October 13, edition the Tampa Bay Times recommended Tom Rooney for the District 17 seat, and on October 19, The Tampa Tribune endorsed him. The Bradenton Herald recommended Rooney on 26 October.

2014

Rooney faced off against Democratic nominee Will Bronson in the November 4, 2014, general election and won with 63.2% of the vote.

2016

Rooney faced off against Democratic nominee April Freeman in the November 8, 2016, general election and won with 61.8% of the vote.

=== Tenure ===
One of the first bills Rooney introduced in the House was to prevent any money being spent to bring prisoners to Florida from the Guantanamo Bay detention camp. Another was a bill he co-sponsored to try to reduce the number of military veteran suicides by mandating mental health screenings for returning troops. Although that bill did not pass, the military eventually adopted the reforms Rooney asked for. Rooney has been recognized by the city of Stuart, Florida for his efforts to prevent veteran suicides.

Rooney sponsored a bill to name a federal courthouse under construction in Fort Pierce in honor of a St. Lucie County rancher, and former Florida Supreme Court Chief Justice Alto Adams. Rooney's bill was approved by the House in September 2009, but was not passed by the Senate until September 2012, when the new courthouse had been open for eight months.

Since 2009, Rooney has personally presented Congressional Award medals to young people in his district.

In April 2011, House Speaker John Boehner, R-Ohio, traveled to Iraq with Rooney and four other members, who met with Prime Minister Nouri al-Maliki and Ambassador James Franklin Jeffrey. Rooney said that they discussed with Maliki how the United States and Iraq might interact diplomatically after the U.S. troop withdrawal scheduled for December of that year.

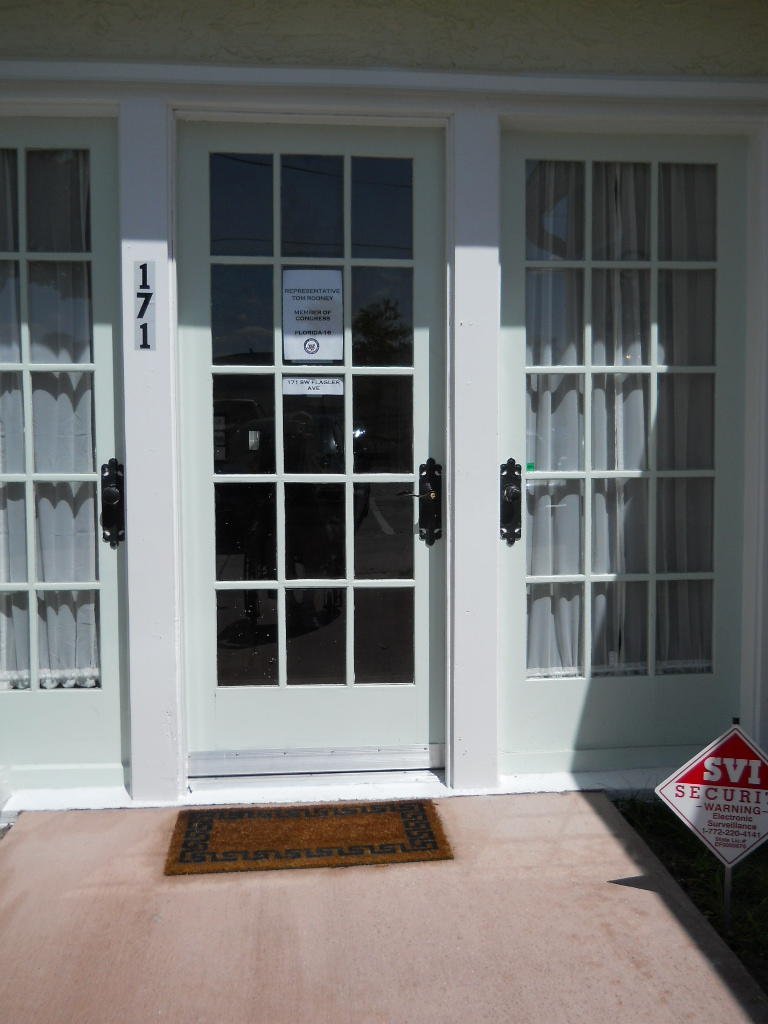
Stuart, Florida office of Congressman Tom Rooney

On the evening of February 19, 2012, a man crashed his pickup truck into Rooney's Stuart, Florida office. No one was inside the building at the time. The man claimed he tried to park in front of the building, but instead of pressing the brake, accidentally pressed the accelerator. The driver was cited for careless driving by the Stuart Police Department.

Rooney, as Chairman of the House Agriculture Subcommittee on Livestock, Dairy and Poultry, introduced the Defense of Environment and Property Act in March 2012. This act would make changes to federal water regulations and prevent some prosecutions of farmers and landowners by the United States Environmental Protection Agency and the United States Army Corps of Engineers. In response to an expansion of federal power to regulate wetlands in a 2011 EPA and Army Corps document that redefined "navigable waters," the Rooney bill defines navigable waters to exclude "wetlands without a continuous surface connection" to a body of water. The Rooney bill is a companion to a Senate bill introduced by U.S. Senator Rand Paul.

==== Libya ====
A June 2011 bill to defund U.S. operations in Libya was written by Rooney, but defeated on the floor of the House because 89 Republicans voted against it. Rooney accepted responsibility for defeat of the bill, which was in competition with a non-binding resolution to deny President Barack Obama authority to wage war against Libya, saying "It was my bill. You can blame me. I think we tried to limit funds so our kids weren't in harm's way but not leave NATO on their own. People either wanted all or they wanted nothing."

On 13 September 2012, Rooney said that Obama should be blamed for attacks on U.S. embassies in the Middle East because the violence, and the deaths of four Americans in the U.S. Consulate attack in Benghazi, was foreseeable: "We supported the rebels without taking into account their individual values or motives, and without understanding their ability or plan to govern. We helped these individuals topple a dictator, but then stood on the sidelines as radical extremists assumed power. It should come as no surprise that these movements in the region have given way to violent, anti-American actions."

==== District switch with Allen West ====
Although most of the voters in Rooney's old 16th District were in the new 18th District, in January 2012 Rooney announced that he would run for the neighboring 17th Congressional District seat, while Allen West declared in the new 18th. Redistricting had made West's old 22nd District, which already had a modest Democratic lean, even more Democratic, and West wanted to run in a friendlier district. As previously mentioned, Rooney's former district had been made somewhat friendlier to Democrats, and he opted to run in a more conservative district that included a large chunk of his old district's western portion.

In announcing his decision to run for reelection in Rooney's Congressional district, Allen West said:

I have always believed the state of Florida would be best served by having both Congressman Tom Rooney and myself in the House of Representatives working to solve our nation's most pressing problems. I have never wavered from my vision; to work to create jobs, restrain federal government spending, reduce America's ever increasing national debt, and provide for a strong national defense to ensure a safer and more prosperous future for our children and grandchildren. Congressman Rooney is a statesman and has been an honorable public servant to the constituents of Florida's 16th Congressional district. It is my goal to continue the success Congressman Rooney has had in Florida's 16th Congressional district in the newly proposed 18th district.

==== Committee assignments ====
- Committee on Agriculture
  - Subcommittee on Livestock, Dairy, and Poultry (Chair)
  - Subcommittee on Nutrition and Horticulture
- Committee on Armed Services
  - Subcommittee on Tactical Air and Land Forces
  - Subcommittee on Military Personnel
  - Subcommittee on Oversight and Investigations
- Permanent Select Committee on Intelligence
- Republican Study Committee

=== Caucus memberships ===
- Congressional Arts Caucus
- United States Congressional International Conservation Caucus
- U.S.-Japan Caucus

== Post-congressional career ==
In June 2023, Maryland Governor Wes Moore appointed Rooney to the Maryland Thoroughbred Racetrack Operating Authority after being nominated by the Maryland Horse Breeders Association. The racetrack operating authority will be dissolved on June 30, 2025.

== Political positions ==
Rooney had a score of 71% from Heritage Action regarding his conservative voting record, which is above the Republican House average.

Rooney favored agricultural subsidies, including crop insurance and sugar price supports, so that food production in this country can better compete with other countries that provide government subsidies to their farmers. Rooney explained that "I don't want our country to depend on Mexico for our food, and I don't want Florida to lose agriculture jobs that we really need."

=== F-35 alternative engine ===
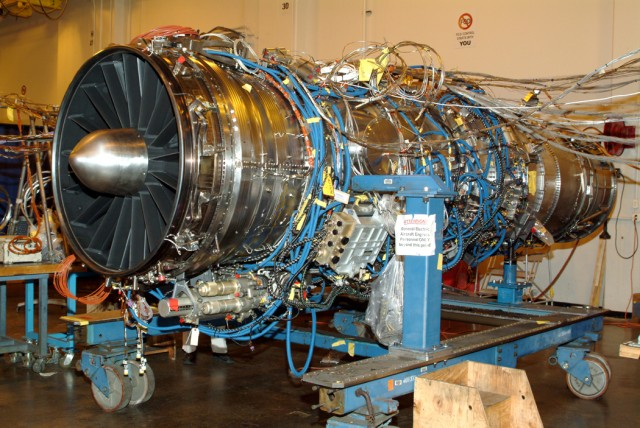
GE/Rolls-Royce engine for F-35

Rooney fought to remove spending for an alternate engine program (built by GE Aviation and Rolls-Royce plc) for the F-35 Joint Strike Fighter. The Pentagon had already taken the position that having a single contractor (Pratt & Whitney) will save money. "The Pentagon has said repeatedly that they do not want it and do not need it, and the American taxpayers certainly cannot afford it," Rooney said.

Rooney sponsored an amendment to the 2012 House spending bill to end funding for the extra engine of the F-35 Joint Strike Fighter, which passed with support from freshman members of the Tea Party Caucus. In December 2011 GE abandoned self-funding to continue development of its alternate engine, finally ending the project. Rooney said that the decision by GE "will finally remove any risk that taxpayers may be saddled with the costs of sustaining an extra engine in the future."

=== Terrorism ===
Rooney criticised Justin Amash in May 2012, accusing the Michigan Republican of wanting to "coddle foreign enemy combatants" because he proposed an amendment to the National Defense Authorization Act (NDAA) to stop the military from indefinitely detaining suspected terrorists who were caught in the United States. Amash and Congressman Adam Smith said they worried about civil liberties and the constitutionality of allowing indefinite detention of U.S. residents suspected of being terrorists. A Rooney press release said that "the Amash amendment sacrifices our national security in order to coddle foreign enemy combatants. Never in our nation's history have we granted enemy combatants who attack our homeland during a time of war the same rights and privileges of American citizens, but that's exactly what the Amash amendment would do." Rooney's press release was criticised in turn by a statement from Ron Paul's Campaign for Liberty which accused Rooney of being "disgracefully dishonest."

Finally, Rooney issued a statement of support for a competing amendment to the NDAA by congressmen Jeff Landry, Louie Gohmert and Scott Rigell: "The Landry/Gohmert/Rigell amendment explicitly re-affirms and protects the constitutional rights of American citizens, and states clearly that no citizens' constitutional rights can be denied under the provisions of the defense bill... While it's critical that we protect the rights of American citizens, we should absolutely not exploit legitimate concerns in a misguided effort to extend our rights and privileges to foreign terrorists who attack our homeland." The Amash/Smith amendment was defeated and the Landry/Gohmert/Rigell amendment was adopted, both by large margins.

=== Muslim Brotherhood controversy ===
On June 13, 2012, Rooney was one of five members of Congress (including Michele Bachmann, Trent Franks, Louie Gohmert and Lynn Westmoreland) to send letters to the Inspectors General of the Office of the Director of National Intelligence, the Department of Defense, the Department of Homeland Security, the Department of Justice and the Department of State seeking investigations into what they claimed was the U.S. government's involvement with the Muslim Brotherhood.

One of the letters in particular to Ambassador Harold W. Geisel, the Deputy Inspector General of the United States Department of State, used the Department's Deputy Chief of Staff, Huma Abedin, as an example of the undue influence. The letter said that Abedin "has three family members–her late father, her mother and her brother–connected to Muslim Brotherhood operatives and/or organizations," referring to a study by the Center for Security Policy.

Republican Senators John McCain, Lindsey Graham, and Scott Brown, as well as Bachmann's former campaign chief Ed Rollins defended Abedin against these allegations. Speaker of the House John Boehner told reporters: "I don't know Huma. But from everything that I do know of her, she has a sterling character, and I think accusations like this being thrown around are pretty dangerous." Congressman Mike Simpson condemned the letter as a revival of McCarthyism, telling the Idaho Statesman: "Unfortunately, it's not just Michele. The public says, 'There go those Republicans again.' It's a bad reflection on all Republicans. I can't believe the other four members she got to sign the letter with her. Amazing... That doesn't reflect the House Republican Caucus."

An editorial in Scripps Treasure Coast Newspapers also brought up the ghost of McCarthyism, explicitly pronouncing disappointment in Rooney. On the other hand, Newt Gingrich argued in favor of investigation into the Muslim Brotherhood, characterizing Rooney and the rest as the "National Security Five." Columnist Cal Thomas shrugged off the specter of McCarthyism, and said that the real possibility of infiltration by Islamic extremists deserves to be investigated.

Responding to her critics, Bachmann said that "The concerns I have and my colleagues have are real," and "We cannot elevate political correctness over national security." Rooney expressed similar concerns: "As a member of the House Armed Services and Intelligence committees, my top priority is ensuring the security of our nation." And that "I regret that Mrs. Abedin has become the media focus of this story, because the intention of the letters was to bring greater attention to the legitimate national security risk." A couple of months later, Rooney admitted that it was an unfortunate mistake to include Mrs. Abedin: "What got lost was a legitimate question, for the sake of using Congressman (Anthony) Weiner's wife and Sec. Clinton's assistant's name specifically in a letter."

During an October campaign stop in Florida to support Mitt Romney, John McCain acknowledged that Rooney and Bachmann had realized that including Abedin's name in the letter to the State Department was a mistake. McCain then softened his earlier criticism from the Senate floor, saying "I'm concerned, and they're concerned and I agree with them, about the influence of the Muslim Brotherhood. I'm not saying all members of the Muslim Brotherhood are extremists, but I am saying there are some extremists that are members of the Muslim Brotherhood. ... There is definitely a threat of radical Muslim extremism, some of whom are Muslim Brotherhood—not all, by far."

=== Tax reform ===
Rooney voted in favor of the Tax Cuts and Jobs Act of 2017. The bill includes disaster relief aid for Florida citrus growers who suffered loss due to Hurricane Irma, which Rooney calls a "big win."

=== Gun policy ===
Rooney characterizes himself as a "champion for Second Amendment rights," saying that the right to bear arms is "one of our most sacred rights."

As of 2017, Rooney has an "A−" rating from the NRA Political Victory Fund, indicating a voting record that is generally pro-gun rights.

As a Congressman, Rooney has voted in favor of several pieces of legislation to expand gun rights, including a yes vote on H. R. 38 (the Concealed Carry Reciprocity Act), which would enable concealed carry reciprocity among all States if and when it is signed into law. Of the Act, Rooney said, "Just as a driver's license would be recognized in another state, a person who is legally permitted to carry a concealed handgun for their or their loved ones' own protection should have that ability anywhere in our nation."

In March 2017, Rooney voted in favor of the Veterans Second Amendment Protection Act, which, if signed into law, will allow veterans who are considered "mentally incompetent" to purchase ammunition and firearms unless declared a danger by a judge. Rooney also voted in favor of H.J.Res.40, which successfully used the Congressional Review Act to block implementation of an Obama-era Amendment to the NICS Improvement Amendments Act of 2007 that was aimed at preventing the mentally-infirm from legally purchasing firearms.

In 2015, Rooney signed a letter to the Bureau of Alcohol, Tobacco, Firearms and Explosives objecting to a proposed ban of a certain rifle cartridge due to its armor-piercing capabilities. In the letter, it states that "the idea that Congress intended LEOPA to ban one of the preeminent rifle cartridges in use by Americans for legitimate purposes is preposterous." The attempt to ban the cartridges was abandoned shortly thereafter.

Rooney opened up more about his opinions on gun lobbyist groups after his February 2018 announcement that he would not be seeking reelection. Rooney stated that even supporting a bump stock ban after the 2017 Las Vegas shooting was akin to "political suicide" and that "the NRA has an extremely sophisticated ability to either help you or hurt you from being able to continue to call yourself 'Congressman.'"

Rooney also questioned the role of AR-15 style rifles in society, saying "What is the purpose of that gun, especially one with a bump stock on it?"

== Personal life ==
Tom Rooney is a grandson of Pittsburgh Steelers founder Art Rooney Sr., the cousin of Pittsburgh Steelers owner Art Rooney II, and a first cousin, once removed, of actresses Kate Mara and Rooney Mara.

Rooney's younger brother, Brian J. Rooney, has a seat on the Pittsburgh Steelers Board of Directors which was previously held by their father. Brian, a veteran of the Iraq War, is a Deputy Director of Michigan Department of Human Services, and was a candidate in 2010 for Congress in Michigan's 7th congressional district. Tom's older brother, Patrick Rooney, Jr., serves in the Florida House of Representatives in District 83.

Tom, Tara and their three sons (Tommy, Sean, Seamus) formerly split their time between Tequesta, Florida and Washington, D.C. Rooney decided to run in the new District 17, and he promised to move into that district, but told The Ledger that he and his wife had not yet decided on which city. Rooney planned to move to Charlotte County, but he said that "I'm leaving where I grew up. That's the hardest thing." Charlotte County has the largest percentage of voters in the newly-drawn district, and includes the city of Punta Gorda (where Rooney has his campaign office and one of his Congressional offices) as well as the larger, but unincorporated Port Charlotte as well as other unincorporated communities. The Rooneys ended up selling their Tequesta home and purchasing a home in Okeechobee.

=== Palm Beach Kennel Club ===
Tom's grandfather, Art Rooney, bought the Palm Beach Kennel Club in West Palm Beach in 1969 and his father ran the business as president from 1984 until recently, when his brother, Patrick J. Rooney Jr., became president of the club. Tom Rooney lists ownership of stock in family businesses in his congressional financial disclosure form. Rooney has said that he has neither operational nor ownership responsibilities, and the stock is part of a trust with his children as beneficiaries. In 2010, Rooney stood at 346th place in terms of net worth among the members of the U.S. House.

The Palm Beach Kennel Club serves the product of yet another family business, Rooney's Old Irish Ale. The Palm Beach County Commission has approved a referendum for the November 2012 ballot to decide whether slot machines will be allowed at the Palm Beach Kennel Club. Tom's cousin Joe Rooney is a spokesman for, as well as Co-Chair and Treasurer of the coalition supporting the Palm Beach County slot machines referendum. Other Florida counties have put slot machine referendums on the November ballot, but Attorney General Pam Bondi issued an opinion that current state law does not allow slots outside of Miami-Dade and Broward counties. Joe Rooney said Palm Beach County will have several paths to follow if the referendum succeeds, including legislation and legal action.

== Movies ==
In 2014, Rooney made a cameo appearance as a farmer in Walt Before Mickey starring Thomas Ian Nicholas, Jon Heder, and Armando Gutierrez.

U.S. House of Representatives
Preceded by Tim Mahoney	Member of the U.S. House of Representatives from Florida's 16th congressional district 2009–2013	Succeeded by Vern Buchanan
Preceded by Frederica Wilson	Member of the U.S. House of Representatives from Florida's 17th congressional district 2013–2019	Succeeded by Greg Steube
U.S. order of precedence (ceremonial)
Preceded by Adam Putnam as Former U.S. Representative	Order of precedence of the United States as Former U.S. Representative	Succeeded by Nick Lampson as Former U.S. Representative
