= Scott B. Palmer =

American congressional aide

Scott B. Palmer (born November 22, 1950) is a former United States congressional aide. He was the chief of staff to United States Representative Dennis Hastert (R-Illinois), the former Speaker of the House in the U.S. House of Representatives.

Palmer attended Aurora University in Aurora, Illinois, from which he received a B.A. degree in history in 1972 and a Master's degree in management in 1983. From 1972 until 1984, he worked for Aurora University.

Palmer was Hastert's Chief of Staff from Hastert's initial election to the U.S. House in 1986 until the former Speaker's retirement in 2007. He also worked on Hastert's campaign staff since Hastert's first run for the Illinois House of Representatives in 1980. He, Hastert and Hastert's Chief of Staff, Mike Stokke, shared a town house in Washington, D.C.

On October 4, 2006, in the midst of the Mark Foley scandal, Palmer publicly denied the assertion by Kirk Fordham, the onetime Chief of Staff for former U.S. Representative Mark Foley, that Fordham had told Palmer about Foley's inappropriate contacts with male pages in 2003 or earlier and had asked Palmer to intervene. Palmer released a statement that day that read, in full: "What Kirk Fordham said did not happen."

Palmer testified under oath in front of the House Ethics Committee on October 23, 2006, regarding his knowledge of the Mark Foley scandal.
