= Kirk Fordham =

American political consultant

Kirk Fordham is Assistant Vice President of Member and Board Engagement for the National Association of Manufacturers.

Fordham spent 18 years working on Capitol Hill and later worked for several philanthropists on a range of conservation, civil rights, and gun violence prevention public affairs campaigns.

Among them, he was the Executive Director of Gill Action, a Denver-based political and advocacy organization leading efforts to ensure equality for LGBT individuals and their families. Fordham led efforts to fund state-based campaigns to legalize same-sex marriage in the United States, cultivating and expanding a network of major donors organized at Gill Action's invitation-only, Political OutGiving conferences.

Previously, Fordham w as CEO of the Miami-based Everglades Foundation.

At the Everglades Foundation, Fordham has overseen the organization's efforts to advance a wide range of massive restoration projects to protect the greater Everglades ecosystem and the water supply for most of South Florida..

Fordham has led lobbying efforts in Tallahassee and Washington, DC to secure funding for the multi-decade restoration initiative that is important to the Florida business community, including large tourism, boating and recreational and fishing industries. Everglades restoration has broad public support in Florida among both political parties, according to a number of public opinion surveys.

Fordham, working with a number of conservation and business groups, played a prominent role advocating for the acquisition of over 26,000 acres of sugar cane fields from U.S. Sugar Corporation after Governor Charlie Crist proposed a complete buyout of the corporation. The land will be used to treat pollution-laden water that flows from the agricultural fields into the Everglades, according to Fordham and other state officials.

In recent years, a number of large restoration projects have broken ground after being funded by both the Army Corps of Engineers and the state of Florida.

Prior to his work at the Everglades Foundation, he was on the staff of various U.S. Republican Party politicians. Fordham was largely unknown outside of Florida and Washington until he was confronted with the fallout from the Mark Foley scandal.

Fordham had worked for Foley, as his chief of staff and campaign manager from 1995 to 2004. Later, he was chief of staff to U.S. Representative Thomas M. Reynolds (R-NY), who, in 2006, was also the chair of the National Republican Congressional Committee.

== Early life and career ==
Fordham is a native of Rochester, New York. He graduated from Greece Olympia High School in Greece, New York, before earning a BA in Government and Politics from the University of Maryland, College Park.

Fordham got his start in politics as an intern for his congressman, Republican Fred J. Eckert. He worked for then Rep. James Inhofe from 1990 to 1994 as his Legislative Director and Deputy Chief of Staff. In 1994 he managed the first congressional campaign of Foley, became his chief of staff, and worked with him for 10 years.

From January 2004 to January 2005 he was the finance director for Senator Mel Martinez.

In December 2006, Fordham launched his own public affairs and government relations firm, called Rock Creek Strategies.

In January 2008, Fordham was hired as the new CEO of the Everglades Foundation, based in Miami, Florida.

On March 1, 2012, Gill Action announced Fordham as its new Executive Director. Upon hearing the news, Rep. Debbie Wasserman Schultz, chair of the Democratic National Committee, said: “Kirk practices a bi-partisan approach to problem-solving that has earned him the respect of many friends on both sides of the aisle. As we continue our march forward to protect the right of every LGBT person to enjoy every opportunity this nation has to offer, I look forward to working with Kirk to build on the progress that has been made by groups like Gill Action.”

Rick Palacio, chairman of the Colorado Democratic Party said: “As someone who has known and worked with him in Washington, I can say with confidence that Kirk is one of the most decent, honorable people one could work with–and a sharp political operative to boot. Kirk knows what Coloradans have always known, that lasting progress comes as a result of a collaborative process and desire for a common good. Tim Gill is fortunate to have him as part of his team.”

== Fordham's Orchestration of Mark Foley's Resignation ==
Fordham, with a decade-plus working relationship with Foley, and close personal friends of Foley and his sister, emerged as a central player in the events leading up to the Congressman's resignation.

When ABC news was about to break the story on Foley's instant messages, Fordham offered ABC News a deal, asking that they delay publishing explicit messages from Foley to pages, in exchange for an exclusive story on Foley's resignation. After it became public, Fordham was then instrumental in working with his boss, Rep. Tom Reynolds, in arranging Foley's resignation. Fordham noted that he had raised the issue with the staff of Speaker of the House Dennis Hastert more than three years prior—before Fordham left his post as Foley's aide in January 2004—but that little had been done. Hastert's Chief of Staff Scott Palmer denied this assertion.

In December 2006, The House Ethics Committee released their report on the Foley scandal and found Fordham's testimony to be credible . The report suggested Fordham had been truthful when he testified he had informed Palmer of Foley's inappropriate behavior toward young male staffers and pages. At the same time, the ethics report indicates that Hastert and Palmer may not have been truthful about their handling of the Foley matter, although the committee did not formally reprimand them.
