= Florida's 16th congressional district =

U.S. House district for Florida

Coordinates: 27°18′23″N 82°25′34″W

- Map of district boundaries
- Representative: Vern Buchanan; R–Sarasota
- Area: 1,664 mi^{2} (4,310 km^{2})
- Distribution: 94.26% urban; 5.74% rural
- Population (2025): 894,621
- Median household income: $95,797
- Ethnicity: 59.8% White; 21.6% Hispanic; 11.1% Black; 3.8% Two or more races; 2.9% Asian; 0.8% other
- Cook PVI: R+6

Florida's 16th congressional district is an electoral district for the U.S. Congress which encompasses eastern Hillsborough County and the entirety of Manatee County. In the 2020 redistricting cycle, the district was drawn out of Sarasota and Sarasota County to include more of Tampa's eastern suburbs, including Riverview and parts of Brandon south of Florida State Road 60.

The district is currently represented by Republican Vern Buchanan.

The 16th district was created as a result of the redistricting cycle after the 1980 census.

When the Florida legislature redistricted in 2002 after the 2000 U.S. census, a federal court described the boundaries of the 16th congressional district and the interlocking 23rd congressional district as an example of gerrymandering and a "raw exercise of majority legislative power".

From 2013 to 2017, the district includes Sarasota County and most of Manatee County. After court-ordered redistricting for the 2016 elections, the district was moved northwards to include southern Hillsborough County, while southern Sarasota County was moved into the 17th district.

== Recent election results from statewide races ==
Year	Office	Results
2008	President	McCain 53% - 46%
2010	Senate	Rubio 50% - 14%
2010	Governor	Scott 56% - 44%
2010	Attorney General	Bondi 61% - 34%
2010	Chief Financial Officer	Atwater 61% - 31%
2012	President	Romney 55% - 45%
2012	Senate	Nelson 52% - 48%
2014	Governor	Scott 55% - 45%
2016	President	Trump 54% - 41%
2016	Senate	Rubio 56% - 39%
2018	Senate	Scott 55% - 45%
2018	Governor	DeSantis 54% - 44%
2018	Attorney General	Moody 58% - 40%
2018	Chief Financial Officer	Patronis 57% - 43%
2020	President	Trump 54% - 45%
2022	Senate	Rubio 60% - 39%
2022	Governor	DeSantis 61% - 38%
2022	Attorney General	Moody 63% - 37%
2022	Chief Financial Officer	Patronis 62% - 38%
2024	President	Trump 57% - 42%
2024	Senate	Scott 57% - 42%

== Composition ==
For the 118th and successive Congresses (based on redistricting following the 2020 census), the district contains all or portions of the following counties and communities: Hillsborough County (14)

Apollo Beach (part; also 14th), Balm, Bloomingdale, Brandon (part; also 15th), Fish Hawk, Gibsonton (part; also 14th), Riverview, Ruskin, Sun City Center, Valrico (part; also 15th), Wimauma

Manatee County (16)

All 16 communities

== List of members representing the district ==
Representative	Party	Years	Cong ress	Electoral history	District location
District created January 3, 1983
Lawrence Smith (Hollywood)	Democratic	January 3, 1983 – January 3, 1993	98th 99th 100th 101st 102nd	Elected in 1982. Re-elected in 1984. Re-elected in 1986. Re-elected in 1988. Re-elected in 1990. Retired.	
Tom Lewis (Palm Beach Gardens)	Republican	January 3, 1993 – January 3, 1995	103rd	Redistricted from the 12th district and re-elected in 1992. Retired.	1993–2003 [data missing]
Mark Foley (Jupiter)	Republican	January 3, 1995 – September 29, 2006	104th 105th 106th 107th 108th 109th	Elected in 1994. Re-elected in 1996. Re-elected in 1998. Re-elected in 2000. Re-elected in 2002. Re-elected in 2004. Resigned.	1993–2003 [data missing]
Mark Foley (Jupiter)	Republican	January 3, 1995 – September 29, 2006	104th 105th 106th 107th 108th 109th	Elected in 1994. Re-elected in 1996. Re-elected in 1998. Re-elected in 2000. Re-elected in 2002. Re-elected in 2004. Resigned.	2003–2013
Vacant		September 29, 2006 – January 3, 2007	109th		2003–2013
Tim Mahoney (Venus)	Democratic	January 3, 2007 – January 3, 2009	110th	Elected in 2006. Lost re-election.	2003–2013
Tom Rooney (Tequesta)	Republican	January 3, 2009 – January 3, 2013	111th 112th	Elected in 2008. Re-elected in 2010. Redistricted to the 17th district.	2003–2013
Vern Buchanan (Sarasota)	Republican	January 3, 2013 – present	113th 114th 115th 116th 117th 118th 119th	Redistricted from the 13th district and re-elected in 2012. Re-elected in 2014. Re-elected in 2016. Re-elected in 2018. Re-elected in 2020. Re-elected in 2022. Re-elected in 2024. Retiring at the end of term.	2013–2017
Vern Buchanan (Sarasota)	Republican	January 3, 2013 – present	113th 114th 115th 116th 117th 118th 119th	Redistricted from the 13th district and re-elected in 2012. Re-elected in 2014. Re-elected in 2016. Re-elected in 2018. Re-elected in 2020. Re-elected in 2022. Re-elected in 2024. Retiring at the end of term.	2017–2023
Vern Buchanan (Sarasota)	Republican	January 3, 2013 – present	113th 114th 115th 116th 117th 118th 119th	Redistricted from the 13th district and re-elected in 2012. Re-elected in 2014. Re-elected in 2016. Re-elected in 2018. Re-elected in 2020. Re-elected in 2022. Re-elected in 2024. Retiring at the end of term.	2023–2027
Sydney Gruters (Sarasota)	Republican	Assuming office on January 3, 2027		Elected in 2026.	2023–2027

== Election results ==
=== 2002 ===
Florida's 16th Congressional District Election (2002)
Party	Candidate	Votes	%
Republican	Mark Foley*	176,171	78.88
Constitution	Jack McLain	47,169	21.12
Total votes		223,340	100.00
Republican hold			

=== 2004 ===
Florida's 16th Congressional District Election (2004)
Party	Candidate	Votes	%
Republican	Mark Foley*	215,563	68.04
Democratic	Jeff Fisher	101,247	31.96
Total votes		316,810	100.00
Republican hold			

=== 2006 ===
Florida's 16th Congressional District Election (2006)
Party	Candidate	Votes	%
Democratic	Tim Mahoney	115,832	49.55
Republican	Mark Foley* (Joe Negron)	111,415	47.66
Independent	Emmie Lee Ross	6,526	2.79
Total votes		223,799	100.00
Democratic gain from Republican			

- The seat became vacant after Foley's sudden resignation on September 29, 2006, after it became public that he had sent inappropriate emails to male teenage former congressional pages. Foley's resignation occurred too late under Florida law to take his name off the ballot. Therefore, Foley's name remained on the ballot, but votes cast for him went to his replacement, State Representative Joe Negron, who would have been duly elected had Foley won the November 7, 2006 election. Since Mahoney won the election, the question did not arise.

=== 2008 ===
Florida's 16th Congressional District Election (2008)
Party	Candidate	Votes	%
Republican	Tom Rooney	209,847	60.10
Democratic	Tim Mahoney*	139,329	39.90
Total votes		349,176	100.00
Republican gain from Democratic			

- Incumbent Tim Mahoney ran for reelection in 2008. His opponent was Tom Rooney, a former JAG officer, Special Assistant United States Attorney, and professor at the United States Military Academy. Rooney is also the grandson of the founder of the Pittsburgh Steelers. While Mahoney was initially favored, after the scandal involving his mistress, the race shifted toward "likely Republican" on the Cook Political Report.

=== 2010 ===
Florida's 16th Congressional District Election (2010)
Party	Candidate	Votes	%
Republican	Tom Rooney*	162,285	66.85
Democratic	Jim Horn	80,327	33.09
No party	Others	151	0.06
Total votes		242,763	100.00
Republican hold			

=== 2012 ===
Florida's 16th Congressional District Election (2012)
Party	Candidate	Votes	%
Republican	Vern Buchanan*	187,147	53.6
Democratic	Keith Fitzgerald	161,929	46.4
Total votes		349,076	100.00
Republican hold			

=== 2014 ===
Florida's 16th Congressional District Election (2014)
Party	Candidate	Votes	%
Republican	Vern Buchanan*	168,990	61.6
Democratic	Henry Lawrence	105,357	38.4
Total votes		274,347	100.00
Republican hold			

=== 2016 ===
Florida's 16th Congressional District Election (2016)
Party	Candidate	Votes	%
Republican	Vern Buchanan*	230,654	59.8
Democratic	Jan Schneider	155,262	40.2
Total votes		385,916	100.00
Republican hold			

=== 2018 ===
Florida's 16th Congressional District Election (2018)
Party	Candidate	Votes	%	±%
Republican	Vern Buchanan*	197,483	54.56%	▼5.21%
Democratic	David Shapiro	164,463	45.44%	▲5.21%
Total votes		361,946	100.00%	▼6.21%
Majority		33,020	9.12%	▼10.4%
Republican hold				

=== 2020 ===
2020 United States House of Representatives elections in Florida
Party	Candidate	Votes	%
Republican	Vern Buchanan (incumbent)	269,001	55.50%
Democratic	Margaret Good	215,683	44.50%
Total votes		484,684	100.0
Republican hold			

=== 2022 ===
2022 United States House of Representatives elections in Florida
Party	Candidate	Votes	%
Republican	Vern Buchanan (incumbent)	189,762	62.15%
Democratic	Jan Schneider	115,575	37.85%
Total votes		305,337	100.0
Republican hold			

=== 2024 ===
2024 United States House of Representatives elections in Florida
Party	Candidate	Votes	%
Republican	Vern Buchanan (incumbent)	247,516	59.48%
Democratic	Jan Schneider	168,625	40.52%
Total votes		416,141	100.0
Republican hold			
