= Frederick J. Marshall =

American judge (1951–2023)

Justice of the New York State Supreme Court from the 8th Judicial district
- In office January 1, 2000 – May 31, 2022

Member of the Erie County Legislature from the 13th district
- In office January 1, 1989 – January 1, 2000
- Preceded by: Thomas M. Reynolds
- Succeeded by: Steven P. McCarville

Personal details
- Born: July 28, 1951 Buffalo, New York, U.S.
- Died: January 3, 2023 (aged 71) Elma, New York, U.S.
- Party: Republican
- Spouse: Judy Gordhamer
- Children: 7
- Education: Buffalo State College; University at Buffalo Law School
- Occupation: Attorney

Frederick J. Marshall (July 28, 1951 – January 3, 2023) was an American jurist who was a justice of the New York State Supreme Court. An attorney and politician in the Buffalo, New York area before moving to the bench, Marshall was a former Minority Leader of the Erie County Legislature. Marshall was the son of the late New York State Supreme Court Justice Frederick M. Marshall. His brother Philip M. Marshall served as the Village Justice in the Buffalo suburb of Orchard Park, New York. Frederick J. Marshall died from non-Hodgkin lymphoma on January 3, 2023, at the age of 71.
