= Tim Mahoney =

American politician (born 1956)

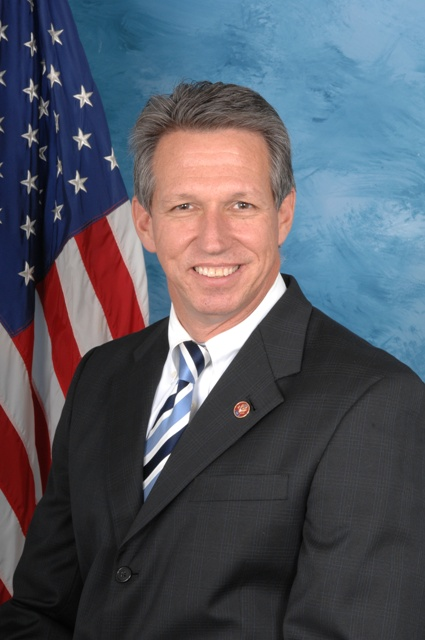
- Official portrait, 2007

Member of the U.S. House of Representatives from Florida's 16th district
- In office January 3, 2007 – January 3, 2009
- Preceded by: Mark Foley
- Succeeded by: Tom Rooney

Personal details
- Born: Timothy Edward Mahoney; August 16, 1956 (age 70) Aurora, Illinois, U.S.
- Party: Republican (before 2005); Democratic (2005–present)
- Spouse: Terry Mahoney (divorced)
- Education: West Virginia University (BA); George Washington University (MBA)

Timothy Edward Mahoney (born August 16, 1956) is an American politician and businessman who served as the U.S. representative for Florida's 16th congressional district from 2007 to 2009. A member of the Democratic Party, he was elected in November 2006 after his opponent, six-term Republican incumbent Mark Foley, resigned on September 29, 2006, after questions were raised about an email exchange with a congressional page.

Mahoney was born in Aurora, located in Kane County, Illinois, but was raised in Summit, New Jersey. He received a Bachelor of Arts degree in computer science and business from West Virginia University in 1978 and a Master of Business Administration from George Washington University in 1983. After graduating university, Mahoney became a computer executive working for Tecmar. In 1986, he moved to Florida, where he became president of Rodime. He co-founded Union Atlantic, LLC, in 1995, and in 1998, he bought vfinance.com, a website for entrepreneurs, and merged the two. Mahoney served as chairman and COO of vFinance, and also formed the Center for Innovative Entrepreneurship, a nonprofit organization centered around measuring the impact of "innovative entrepreneurship" on the economy.

In 2006, Mahoney ran for U.S. Congress to represent Florida's 16th congressional district as a Democrat, challenging the incumbent Representative, Republican Mark Foley, in what was initially rated as a safe seat for Foley. After Foley was forced to resign due to a scandal involving him sending sexual messages to a congressional page, the race became more competitive, and Mahoney narrowly beat the replacement nominee, state representative Joe Negron, in the November election, with 49.55% of the vote. Mahoney was sworn in on January 3, 2007, to the 110th Congress. While in Congress, Mahoney joined the moderate Blue Dog Coalition and New Democrat Coalition groups, and has been described as a moderate and conservative Democrat.

In October 2008, media outlets began reporting allegations that Mahoney paid hush money to a mistress to conceal an extramarital affair. Mahoney's wife filed for divorce in October 2008, and Mahoney, running for re-election, lost the November 4 election to Republican nominee Tom Rooney by 20 points. Mahoney left office in January 2009, and continues to reside in Palm Beach Gardens.

== Early life, education, and career ==
Mahoney was born in Aurora, Illinois on August 16, 1956, the son of an AT&T computer programmer. He grew up in Summit, New Jersey, and graduated from Summit High School in 1974. Mahoney obtained a Bachelor of Arts degree in computer science and business from West Virginia University in 1978 and a Master of Business Administration degree from George Washington University in 1983.

After graduating university, Mahoney began his career in the computer business. After seven years, he attained wealth when a company he was working for, Tecmar, which sold personal computer accessories, was sold. In 1986, he moved to Florida and became president of Rodime Systems, a division of Rodime Inc. Rodime, for which Mahoney was also vice president of marketing and sales, manufactured disc drives that were packaged for the retail market by Rodime Systems. Rodime's manufacturing plant was relocated to Singapore in 1989, and Mahoney sold Rodime Systems. In 1995, Mahoney and his business partner, Lenny Sokolow, started Union Atlantic, LLC, a venture capital firm. His inability to get the firm listed on vfinance.com, a website for venture capitalists, led him and Sokolow to purchase the website in 1998 for $100,000, merging it with Union Atlantic.

After purchasing the website, Mahoney served as chairman and chief operating officer of vFinance, Inc., which he expanded into a venture capital and financial services firm located in Boca Raton. The company initially grew quickly after buying several other broker-dealer and financial services customers, including its acquisition of Sterling Financial Investment Group. vFinance employed more than 200 workers in 30 offices around the U.S. and managed greater than $1 billion in assets. Mahoney continued to upgrade the website, and added numerous features which customers could use. Sokolow replaced Mahoney as chairman and COO in 2007, and vFinance eventually merged with National Holdings Corporation.

Mahoney also co-founded and served as president of the Center for Innovative Entrepreneurship (CIE), a nonprofit organization.

== U.S. House of Representatives (2007–2009) ==
Mahoney, who was inspired by Ronald Reagan to originally become a Republican, switched his party affiliation to the Democratic Party in 2005, although still holding his conservative viewpoints, due to alleged "disillusionment" while in the GOP.

=== Elections ===
==== 2006 ====
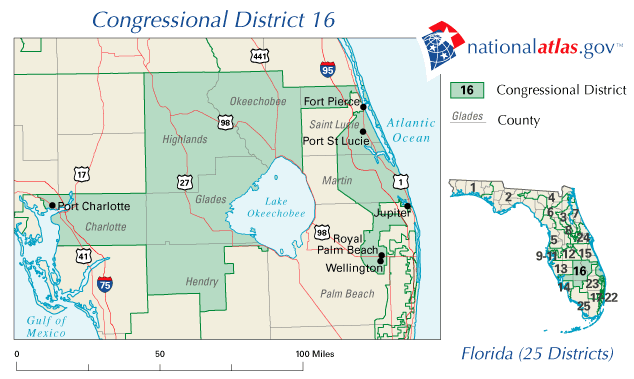
Florida's 16th congressional district from 2003 to 2013

Mahoney ran for Congress as a first-time political candidate in 2006 to represent Florida's 16th congressional district. The district comprised eight counties, including part of Palm Beach County and St. Lucie County. Mahoney said that he decided to run largely due to frustration with Congressional Republicans and the Bush administration. Mahoney was unopposed in the September 5 Democratic primary election. In the general election, Mahoney faced six-term Republican incumbent Mark Foley, who had represented the district since 1995 and went unopposed in the Republican primary. In 2006, 42% of the voters in this district were registered Republicans, and 36% were registered Democrats, with the district having a CPVI of R+2. George W. Bush won the district with 54% of the vote, a margin of greater than 8% over Democratic nominee John Kerry, in the 2004 presidential election. In the previous 2004 election for the seat, Foley won with 68% of the vote over the Democratic challenger. Mahoney was behind Foley in polls for the race, and trailed by double digits, despite spending almost $400,000 of his own money in the race. At the time, the race was not expected to be competitive, with Foley predicted to win easily over Mahoney.

During the campaign, Mahoney ran on a platform of moderation, including describing Ronald Reagan as a "hero" and describing himself as a "conservative Christian". Mahoney stated that there was a need to reduce abortions without fully banning them, and also said that he favored repealing the estate tax and opposed further gun restriction laws. Mahoney ran as a conservative "common sense" businessman and stated that he was "as conservative as you can get", but said that the Republican Party had been "hijacked by a very radical group of people" who he didn't believe represented Republican values. Mahoney also criticized Foley's voting record and his support of the Bush administration's positions, including their policies on the Iraq War and government spending. In August, Mahoney was endorsed by General Wesley Clark, a former candidate for president of the United States in the 2004 election. Mahoney also filed a lawsuit against the Foley campaign for what he called "misleading" television advertisements about his business career.

On September 28, 2006, ABC News reported that Foley had sent email messages, from his personal AOL account, to a then-16-year-old former congressional page, asking the page to send a photo of himself to Foley, among other things that were overtly sexual in nature. The messages showed Foley, under the username "Maf54", trying to meet the teenage page, as well as referencing the page's sexual orientation. Mahoney called for an investigation into the matter, and Foley resigned the next day. Foley's resignation gave Democrats an opportunity of taking the seat, and the race quickly became more competitive. Mahoney denied allegations that his staff was responsible for the leaks. After the scandal became public, Mahoney starting campaigning on a platform to restore integrity and dignity to the seat and reduce corruption in Washington. Mahoney's campaign included the slogan "Restoring America's values begins at home." Mahoney became the favorite to win the seat, and was endorsed by numerous high-profile Democrats, including Mark Warner and John Kerry, who campaigned with Mahoney. Mahoney's campaign also released a 30-second television advertisement titled "Graham Man" featuring former governor of Florida and U.S. senator Bob Graham, which was cut before the scandal broke, but aired promptly after. Mahoney quickly rose to the top of the polls, and gained a lead of 7 points. Congressional Quarterly (CQ) shifted the race from safe Republican to tossup, and eventually to favoring Mahoney.

External videos
- Florida 16th Congressional District Midterm Election, October 4, 2006, C-SPAN

Foley's resignation originally left Mahoney without a Republican opponent in the election. However, on October 2, 2006, the Florida Republican Party Executive Committee selected Joe Negron, a member of the Florida House of Representatives from the 82nd district and former candidate for Florida Attorney General, as Mahoney's new opponent. Under Florida law, Negron's name did not appear on the ballot; he only received votes cast for Foley, whose name remained on the ballot. The Florida Democratic Party filed an emergency injunction to prevent elections supervisors from placing signs at polling places stating that a vote for Foley would go to Negron, arguing that it would violate state laws that prohibit the soliciting of voters. Negron ran on a campaign which reminded voters to "Punch Foley for Joe", and said that the district's voters would not be "defined by the disgraceful actions" of Foley. Mahoney's campaign sought to portray Negron as a political insider who favored insurers over homeowners. Mahoney generally avoided the Foley scandal while campaigning, saying that he "wish[ed] the best for [Foley]" and all people involved. Mahoney was endorsed by the Sarasota Herald-Tribune, citing his successful business career and his moderate policies. However, while Mahoney still led in the polls, multiple predictors changed their ratings from favoring Mahoney to tossup. On election day, Mahoney narrowly defeated Negron with a plurality of 49.55%, a margin of 4,417 votes and 1.89 percentage points, with Independent candidate Emmie Lee Ross taking 2.79 percent of the vote. While Negron carried most of the more conservative areas of the district near Fort Myers, Mahoney carried the two largest counties in the district, Palm Beach and St. Lucie counties, by a combined margin of 10,723 votes, far more than the actual margin of victory. Negron called Mahoney to congratulate him, and publicly conceded to his supporters at the Hutchinson Island Marriott. Mahoney gathered his supporters at the Jupiter Beach Resort & Spa, where he held his victory celebration.

Mahoney was sworn in on January 3, 2007, to the 110th U.S. Congress.

==== 2008 ====
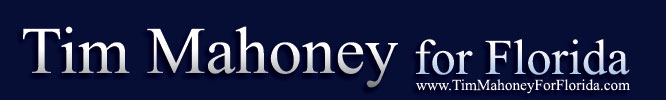
Mahoney's re-election campaign logo

Mahoney ran for re-election to Congress in 2008, and went unopposed in the Democratic primary. Mahoney faced Republican challenger Tom Rooney in the general election. Rooney defeated State Representative Gayle Harrell and former Palm Beach Gardens councilman Hal Valeche in the Republican primary. Mahoney had been a top target for defeat in 2008, due to the district's Republican voting history, and was seen as the only Democrat from South Florida to be vulnerable to defeat. However, Mahoney initially led in surveys of the race. At one point in the campaign, Mahoney was shown to have a 20-point lead in the polls. In September 2008, a poll of 400 likely voters conducted by Rooney's campaign showed Mahoney with a 48 to 41 point lead over Rooney with a margin of error of 4 points.

Revelations of his extramarital affair severely hampered his re-election chances. House Speaker Nancy Pelosi called for a House Ethics Committee investigation concerning the matter. Mahoney said he requested an ethics investigation as well, stating that the allegations were "based on hearsay" but his constituents "need a full accounting". Two days later, CQ Politics changed their forecast on the race from "No Clear Favorite" to "Leans Republican". Mahoney pulled out of attending a debate with his opponent due to the organizers refusing to prohibit television media from covering the event, leaving Rooney as the sole candidate at the debate. Due to his conservative positions on gun rights, Mahoney was endorsed by the National Rifle Association of America. In light of the scandal, Democratic Pennsylvania State Representative Timothy S. Mahoney issued a press release explaining that he was not involved in an extramarital affair, due to both politicians' similar names. Mahoney raised over $3 million, and spent $2,756,453 on the race. However, in the November election, Mahoney was soundly defeated by former assistant state Attorney General Tom Rooney. Mahoney won only 40% of the vote to Rooney's 60%, the largest margin of defeat for an incumbent in the 2008 cycle.

=== Political positions ===
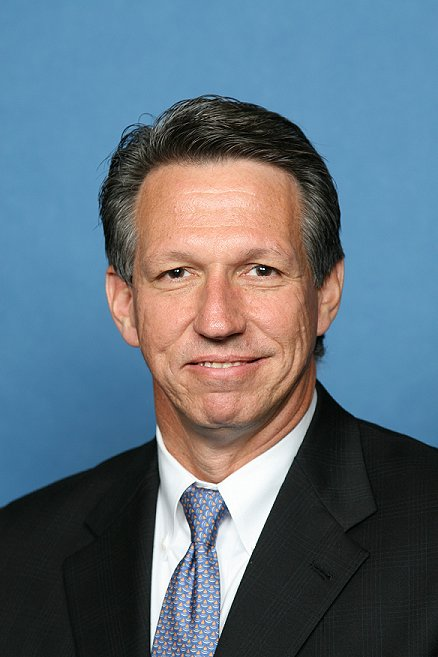
Mahoney's freshman congressional portrait

Mahoney was generally considered to be a moderate Democrat, and he considered himself to be a conservative Democrat. His positions are described below:

- Homeland Security: Supports screening of all cargo containers entering American ports, and increased funding for first responders.
- Immigration: Supports increased border security.
- Seniors: Opposed to Social Security Privatization. Supports reforming Medicare's Part D Prescription Drug Program.
- Environment: Advocate of preserving Florida Everglades from unregulated development. Supports Comprehensive Everglades Restoration Project.
- Insurance: Supports guaranteed disaster insurance for high-risk areas. Advocate of national catastrophic fund on Financial Services Committee.
- Supported the Farm, Nutrition and Bioenergy Act of 2007.

He was a member of the Blue Dog Coalition, a group of Democratic members of Congress known for moderate to conservative stances, especially on fiscal issues. Mahoney also was a member of the New Democrat Coalition, a centrist group of Democrats in Congress.

On September 29, 2008, Mahoney voted for the Emergency Economic Stabilization Act of 2008.

=== Committee assignments ===
- Committee on Financial Services
  - Subcommittee on Capital Markets, Insurance, and Government-Sponsored Enterprises
  - Subcommittee on Financial Institutions and Consumer Credit
- Committee on Agriculture
  - Subcommittee on Horticulture and Organic Agriculture
  - Subcommittee on Livestock, Dairy, and Poultry

=== Caucus memberships ===
- Blue Dog Coalition
- New Democrat Coalition

== Electoral history ==
Florida's 16th congressional district election, 2006
Party	Candidate	Votes	%
Democratic	Tim Mahoney	115,832	49.55
Republican	Mark Foley	111,415	47.66
Independent	Emmie Lee Ross	6,526	2.79
Total votes		223,799	100.00
Democratic gain from Republican			

Florida's 16th congressional district election, 2008
Party	Candidate	Votes	%
Republican	Tom Rooney	209,874	60.1
Democratic	Tim Mahoney (incumbent)	139,373	39.9
Total votes		349,247	100.00
Republican gain from Democratic			

== Post-congressional career ==
Mahoney hinted at a potential run for his former seat in the 2010 elections against Tom Rooney, stating that he was "seriously thinking about doing it" and that he "learned a lot of lessons". However, Mahoney ultimately decided not to run, stating that he would instead work with the Democratic Party to "elect moderate Democrats who will work for the people of Florida" and defeat Republicans in the state. Rooney was re-elected against Democrat Jim Horn in 2010 by a margin of 33.7%.

In March 2013, Mahoney, along with fellow Congressmen Allen Boyd and Mike Arcuri, formed Cannae Policy Group, LLC, a government affairs firm located in Washington, D.C. The firm takes its name from the Cannae Tactic, a strategic military move which involves a double pincer movement that was originally used in the Battle of Cannae. Mahoney also is owner and founder of Caribou, LLC, an advisory firm which he founded in 2009, and has served on the board of directors of Agrify, a developer of growing solutions for indoor cannabis & hemp cultivation, since December 17, 2020.

In 2021, Mahoney wrote an op-ed published in the Treasure Coast Newspapers in which he stated that congressmen Bill Posey, Brian Mast, and other Republicans in Congress should apologize and resign for "sedition" related to attempts to overturn the 2020 United States presidential election and the 2021 storming of the United States Capitol. Regarding former president Donald Trump's residency at Mar-a-Lago, Mahoney stated that Trump should "live up to his agreement" set in 1993, which prohibited permanent residence at the club.

== Personal life ==
Mahoney has a home in Palm Beach Gardens, though he was described in the official House roll as residing in Venus. He also owns a cattle ranch in southern Highlands County. He is divorced and has a daughter named Bailey Mahoney, a former scholarship equestrian athlete at Oklahoma State University who now practices law in Denver, Colorado after earning a Juris Doctor degree from the University of Denver College of Law, as well as 2 other children, Vivian and JJ. Mahoney, a Methodist, describes himself as a "fundamental Christian". Mahoney and his wife Terry were members of the Venus United Methodist Church, located in Venus.

=== Divorce ===
After news of his extramarital affair was revealed, Mahoney's wife, Terry Ellen Mahoney, filed for divorce on October 20, 2008, less than a month before Mahoney lost re-election to Congress. The divorce was finalized in 2010, with Mahoney and his wife splitting $2.83 million in assets, and Mahoney keeping their property in the PGA National Resort and Spa, which he used as his residence while in Congress, with his wife keeping their property in Oklahoma.

== Controversies ==
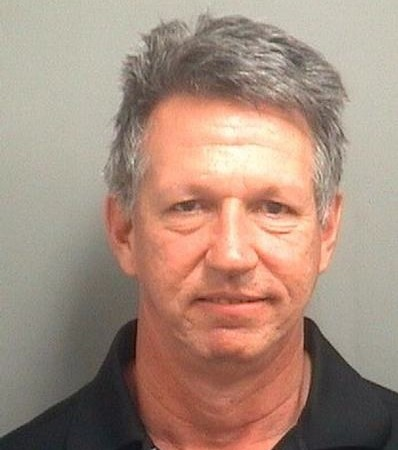
Mahoney's mugshot

=== Residency scandal ===
On September 18, 2008, the Capitol Hill newspaper Roll Call ran an article questioning Mahoney's residency status. It alleged that Mahoney had registered to vote at "a horse barn" for the purposes of having residency in his congressional district, while his primary residence was actually in another district. The issue came to light after Mahoney missed a rent payment on his Capitol Hill apartment in July 2007. The case itself was dismissed on September 6, 2007. While Mahoney's opponent, Tom Rooney, attempted to make light of the allegations, the attack proved ineffective after Democrats revealed that Rooney himself was registered to vote at a dog track. While members of the House are only required to live in the state they wish to represent, it has become a strong convention that they live in or near the district they represent as well.

=== Sex scandals ===
On October 13, 2008, ABC News reported that Mahoney had agreed to a $121,000 payment to a former mistress who worked on his staff and was threatening to sue him. Because Mahoney won this seat in 2006 after a sex scandal forced the incumbent to resign, several considered it ironic that a sex scandal of his own coming to light a month before the election, especially since he first campaigned against such corruption. Some professional political pundits, including Charlie Cook, reclassified the race as "Leans" or "Likely Republican." The FBI investigated whether Mahoney hired the first mistress and put her on the federal payroll in order for her to keep their affair secret.

Mahoney admitted to having "numerous" affairs, stating that he had "certainly more than two." Mahoney's wife Terry filed for divorce in Palm Beach County court on October 20, 2008.

=== 2011 arrest ===
On August 6, 2011, Mahoney was booked into the Palm Beach County jail and charged with a DUI offense after being found asleep in his car by a North Palm Beach police officer at around 3:00 a.m. According to jail records, Mahoney was booked at 7:12 a.m. and was released at 11:15 a.m. on his own recognizance. Regarding the arrest, Mahoney said "I got arrested for DUI last night and it's regrettable," and also stated to reporters "I'd like to thank law enforcement for all they do. They do an outstanding job." Mahoney said that he planned to plead innocent due to his "conscious decision not to drive."

== See also ==
- List of federal political sex scandals in the United States
- List of United States representatives who served a single term

== Notes ==
U.S. House of Representatives
Preceded by Mark Foley	Member of the U.S. House of Representatives from Florida's 16th congressional district 2007–2009	Succeeded by Tom Rooney
U.S. order of precedence (ceremonial)
Preceded by Peter Meijer as Former U.S. Representative	Order of precedence of the United States as Former U.S. Representative	Succeeded by Suzanne Kosmas as Former U.S. Representative
