= Thomas M. Reynolds =

American politician (born 1950)

Tom Reynolds
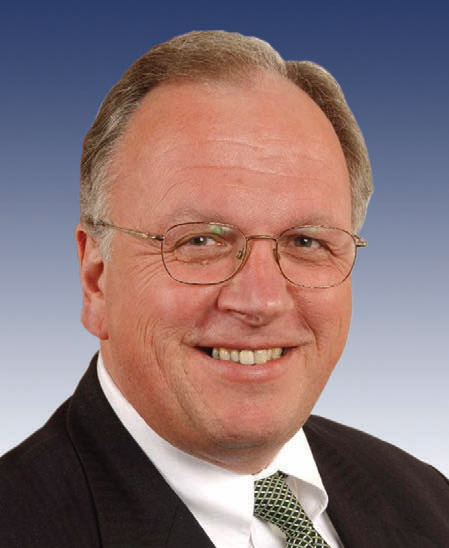

Member of the U.S. House of Representatives from New York
- In office January 3, 1999 – January 3, 2009
- Preceded by: Bill Paxon
- Succeeded by: Chris Lee
- Constituency: 27th district (1999–2003); 26th district (2003–2009)

Minority Leader of the New York State Assembly
- In office June 30, 1995 – March 2, 1998
- Preceded by: Clarence D. Rappleyea Jr.
- Succeeded by: John Faso

Member of the New York State Assembly from the 147th district
- In office January 1, 1989 – December 31, 1998
- Preceded by: Bill Paxon
- Succeeded by: Daniel Burling

Member of the Erie County Legislature from the 13th district
- In office 1983–1988
- Preceded by: Ronald P. Bennett
- Succeeded by: Frederick J. Marshall

Personal details
- Born: September 3, 1950 (age 76) Bellefonte, Pennsylvania, U.S.
- Party: Republican
- Spouse: Donna Reynolds
- Children: 4
- Education: Kent State University (attended)

Military service
- Allegiance: United States
- Branch/service: United States Air Force
- Years of service: 1970–1976
- Unit: New York Air National Guard
- Reynolds's voice Reynolds supporting a House resolution recognizing National Farm Safety and Health Week. Recorded September 22, 2004

Thomas M. Reynolds (born September 3, 1950) is an American politician from the U.S. state of New York, formerly representing the state's 27th and 26th congressional districts in the United States House of Representatives. Reynolds was chairman of the National Republican Congressional Committee, the official Republican House campaign organization, for the 2006 election cycle. He retired amid scandal at the end of the 110th Congress. He was cleared of any wrongdoing by the House Committee on Standards of Official Conduct. Chris Lee was elected to succeed him.

== Early life ==
Reynolds was born in Bellefonte, Pennsylvania, and graduated from the Springville-Griffith Institute. He served in the New York Air National Guard from 1970 to 1976.

He entered politics as a Republican, and was elected to the Concord, New York, town board in 1974, and to the Erie County legislature in 1982. He was a member of the New York State Assembly (147th D.) from 1989 to 1998, sitting in the 188th, 189th, 190th, 191st and 192nd New York State Legislatures. He was Minority Leader from June 1995 to March 1998.

== U.S. House of Representatives ==
=== 1998 election ===
Reynolds ran for the House in 1998 after Bill Paxon was forced out of his leadership role in the House Republican leadership ranks because of his role in a coup attempt against Newt Gingrich. Paxon endorsed Reynolds, who had managed several of his past campaigns, as his successor. There was controversy because Reynolds did not live in Paxon's district; his Springville home was in the neighboring district of fellow Republican Jack Quinn, who was running for his own reelection. Reynolds would not move into the district until eight months after the election when he purchased a home in Clarence, near Amherst, one of the larger towns in the seven-county district.

=== Committee assignments ===
- Ways and Means Committee
  - Subcommittee on Select Revenue Measures
  - Subcommittee on Trade

=== Political positions ===
Reynolds had a conservative voting record in Congress. His 83 percent rating from the American Conservative Union tied him with Peter T. King of Long Island as the third-most conservative among the state's 29 Representatives as of the 110th Congress. Only Representatives Randy Kuhl (92%) and Vito Fossella (84%) received higher ratings. Reynolds is on record as a member of the American Legislative Exchange Council (ALEC).

=== Re-elections ===
In the 2000 round of redistricting, a special master proposed a plan that would have made his district slightly more Democratic. Although Republicans would have still held a plurality, the plan would have left Reynolds vulnerable to a primary with a moderate Republican. According to one political strategist, Reynolds and his allies in Washington wanted a district that would let him vote "like a Southern conservative". With the help of Vice President Dick Cheney, Reynolds pressured the state legislature to gerrymander his district so that it closely resembled his former territory.

He was handily reelected from this reconfigured district in 2002. In 2004, his opponent was millionaire industrialist Jack Davis. Reynolds won by 12 points, an unusually close margin given that he had won with 72% of the vote two years earlier. In 2006 Reynolds again defeated Davis by 4% of the vote amid the Mark Foley page scandal.

== Retirement and lobbying career ==
On March 20, 2008, Reynolds announced he would not run for a sixth term: "it was time to take up new challenges". Aside from fallout from the scandal regarding U.S. Representative Mark Foley (R-FL), another factor was thought to be revelations that a former NRCC treasurer had embezzled hundreds of thousands of dollars from the committee treasury while Reynolds chaired it. According to the New York Daily News political reporter Elizabeth Benjamin, the NRCC was never independently audited during Reynolds' three-year tenure as its chairman.

Reynolds was the 29th Republican incumbent to announce he would not run again in 2008. Despite the perception that Reynolds had the district redrawn to protect him, it is actually a somewhat marginal district on paper; it has a Cook Partisan Voting Index of R+3.

In 2017, Reynolds joined Washington, D.C., lobbying firm Holland and Knight as a senior policy advisor.

== National Republican Congressional Committee ==
Reynolds served as chairman of the National Republican Congressional Committee from 2003 to 2006. During the 2004 House elections the Republicans gained three seats to increase their majority to 232. The 2006 House election saw a Republican loss of 30 seats, losing the majority to the Democrats.

== 2006 House page scandal ==
Rodney Alexander (R-Louisiana), the sponsor of a House page (from his district) who received e-mails from Representative Mark Foley, told reporters that he learned of the e-mails from the page's family in November 2005. Alexander said the family did not want the matter pursued. Alexander said he passed information that Foley had appeared overly friendly first to Majority Leader John Boehner, and later to Reynolds, chairman of the National Republican Congressional Committee. Carl Forti, a spokesman for the GOP campaign organization, said Reynolds also was told by Alexander that the parents did not want to pursue the matter and that they did not want a large-scale investigation.

Reynolds later issued a statement that he had spoken with House Speaker Dennis Hastert about the matter early in 2006. According to The Washington Post, "Republican insiders said Reynolds spoke out because he was angry that Hastert appeared willing to let him take the blame for the party leadership's silence." Hastert did not "explicitly recall" that conversation but said he did not dispute it.

On October 2, Reynolds held a press conference on the matter, from Buffalo at Daemen College while surrounded by numerous children of his adult supporters. He said he took the Foley matter to his "supervisor" as soon as he found out about it. Reynolds claimed that he had no knowledge of any sexual conversations or e-mails between Foley and the page until after it was disclosed in the media.

Soon after, he made a televised campaign advertisement stating that he had had no knowledge of the depth of Foley's transgressions until afterwards. In December 2006, Reynolds was largely exonerated by the Republican-controlled House Committee on Standards of Official Conduct, which probed the Foley case. The Rochester Democrat and Chronicle reported in its December 9 edition that "Rep. Tom Reynolds told the truth when he said he told House Speaker Dennis Hastert about ex-Rep. Mark Foley's questionable e-mails to congressional pages, the House ethics committee has concluded", while the Associated Press reported "the House ethics committee on Friday cleared Rep. Thomas Reynolds and his ex-chief of staff Kirk Fordham of wrongdoing in the congressional page scandal."

On page 76 of its report, the committee reported they had uncovered that "the communications directors for both the House Democratic Caucus and the Democratic Congressional Campaign Committee also had copies of the e-mails in the fall of 2005", months prior to Reynolds' knowledge of the incident. During the 2006 campaign, Republicans charged that Democrats had prior knowledge of Foley's inappropriate e-mails with a House page. Democrats, including DCCC Chairman Rahm Emanuel, denied the accusation.

New York State Assembly
Preceded by Clarence Rappleyea	Minority Leader of the New York Assembly; 1995–1998	Succeeded by John Faso
U.S. House of Representatives
Preceded by Bill Paxon	Member of the U.S. House of Representatives from New York's 27th congressional district 1999–2003	Succeeded by Jack Quinn
Preceded by Maurice Hinchey	Member of the U.S. House of Representatives from New York's 26th congressional district 2003–2009	Succeeded by Chris Lee
Party political offices
Preceded by Thomas M. Davis	Chair of the National Republican Congressional Committee; 2003–2009	Succeeded by Tom Cole
U.S. order of precedence (ceremonial)
Preceded by Bill Paxon as Former U.S. Representative	Order of precedence of the United States as Former U.S. Representative	Succeeded by Tom Reed as Former U.S. Representative
