= Mark Foley scandal =

Political scandal

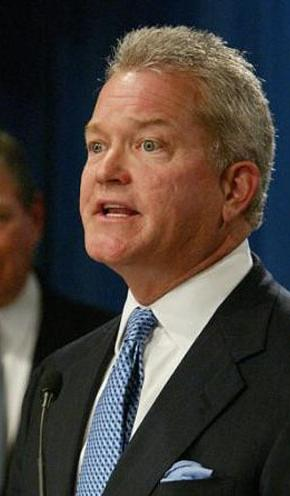
Mark Foley

The Mark Foley scandal, which broke in late September 2006, centered on solicitous emails and sexually suggestive instant messages sent by Mark Foley, a Republican member of the United States House of Representatives from Florida, to teenage boys who had formerly served as congressional pages. Investigation was closed by the Florida Department of Law Enforcement (FDLE) on September 19, 2008, citing insufficient evidence to pursue criminal charges as both "Congress and Mr. Foley denied us access to critical data," according to FDLE Commissioner Gerald Bailey. The scandal grew to encompass the response of the Republican congressional leadership to previous complaints about Foley's contacts with the pages and inconsistencies in the leaders' public statements. There were also allegations that another Republican congressman, Jim Kolbe, had improper conduct with at least two teenage male pages, but federal investigators absolved Kolbe of any wrongdoing in the case.

The scandal led to Foley's resignation from Congress on September 29, 2006. In some quarters, the scandal is believed to have contributed to the Republican Party's loss of control over Congress in the 2006 midterm elections, as well as the end of House Speaker Dennis Hastert's leadership of the House Republicans. Kirk Fordham, chief of staff to Rep. Tom Reynolds and former chief of staff for Foley, also resigned as a result of the scandal.

Newsweek's June 7, 2010, issue's Back Story listed Foley, among others, as a prominent conservative politician who had a record of anti-gay legislation and yet was later caught in a gay sex scandal.

The questionable conversations, which took place between 1995 and 2005, were investigated by the FBI for possible criminal violations. In September 2008, Florida officials investigating Foley decided not to charge him, citing a lack of evidence and the expiration of the statute of limitations. The House Ethics Committee investigated the response of the House Republican leadership and their staff to earlier warnings about Foley's conduct, some of which went back several years. In early October 2006, two news organizations anonymously quoted former pages who said that they had sexual liaisons with Foley after turning 18 and 21. During this time, Foley was chairman of the House Caucus on Missing and Exploited Children, which introduced legislation targeting sexual predators and created stricter guidelines for tracking them.

== Messages ==
=== Emails ===
In 2005, Foley sent five emails to a 16-year-old former page from Monroe, Louisiana who had been sponsored by Rep. Rodney Alexander (R–LA). They were the first messages to be made public in the scandal. Among other things, Foley asked the page for his photo, his age and birthday, how school was going for him, and what he wanted for a birthday present. Foley also observed that another male page (to whom he had also written) was "in really great shape ... i am just finished riding my bike on a 25 mile journey ..." The page forwarded the emails to a colleague in Alexander's office, saying "this really freaked me out", and described Foley's request for a photo by repeating the word "sick" 13 times in a row. The page asked his colleague "if you can, please tell Rodney [Alexander] about this", and additionally mentioned a female page who had been warned about a congressman who "hit on" interns.

ABC News reported on October 5 that in 2002, Foley emailed one page with an invitation to stay at the congressman's home in exchange for oral sex. The page, who was 17 years-old at the time, declined the offer. The same report stated that he emailed another with a request for a photograph of his erect penis. Another former page reported that he saw sexually explicit emails sent to one page from his page class of 2001–2002, and learned of "three or four" pages from that class who received similar emails.

=== Instant messages ===
After the initial story on the emails, other pages contacted ABC and The Washington Post, providing transcripts of sexually explicit instant messaging (IM) conversations from 2003 that Foley had with two pages who were under the age of 18 at the time. The Washington Post reported it had received its copies of the same IMs from a page who had served on Capitol Hill with the two pages to whom they had been addressed.

Another former page, Tyson Vivyan, said that he had received "sexually suggestive" messages from Foley in 1997, a month after he left the page program. A page from the class of 1998 also reported receiving explicit IMs from Foley. A page from the class of 2000 reported he chatted with Foley during the Congressman's 2000 visit to the page dormitory, and afterwards, he began receiving e-mails and IMs from Foley, which became explicit immediately after his 18th birthday.

=== Sources of messages and chronology ===
In November 2005, the initial five e-mails were leaked out of Alexander's office, after the recipient (a page whom Alexander sponsored) reported them to the Congressman.

Two Florida newspapers, the St. Petersburg Times and Miami Herald, and the Fox News Channel acquired copies of these e-mails in November 2005, but decided not to publish a story. According to an editor at the St. Petersburg Times, they received the e-mails from a source in Alexander's office.

The St. Petersburg Times editors decided the exchange was probably just "friendly chit-chat". Nonetheless, they assigned two reporters to investigate in November 2005. The recipient of the e-mail refused to cooperate with the reporters, and no other pages they interviewed had complaints about correspondence with Foley. The Times revisited their investigation "more than once", ultimately choosing not to break the story.

Ken Silverstein, an editor at Harper's Magazine, said that he received copies of the five e-mails in May 2006 from a "Democratic operative". Silverstein subsequently wrote a story on the e-mails, which was cancelled due to a lack of absolute proof that Foley was anything more than "creepy". He said that his source "was not working in concert with the national Democratic Party" but was "genuinely disgusted" by Foley's behavior. Silverstein himself passed the information to other media organizations after cancelling the story.

In July 2006, a paid Republican Congressional staffer sent copies of the e-mails to several Washington media organizations through an intermediary. The organization Citizens for Responsibility and Ethics in Washington (CREW) said it received copies of the e-mails on July 21 and turned them over to the FBI that same day.

In August 2006, ABC News reporter Brian Ross received the initial e-mails from a Republican source but did not write a story for over a month because he was working on other stories.

On September 24, 2006, the e-mails were released by Lane Hudson on his anonymous blog Stop Sex Predators. Hudson was at the time employed by the Human Rights Campaign (HRC). When the HRC found out about Hudson's activity during the week of October 25, 2006, it publicly fired him for misusing its resources.

The political humor blog Wonkette drew readers' attention to the posted e-mails on September 27. The next day, September 28, Ross reported on the e-mails which he had received in August.

After that initial story, two sources brought copies of more explicit instant messages to ABC News and The Washington Post. Both were former pages – the first was a Republican who would "never vote for a Democrat", and the second was a Democrat from the same class as the two pages who received the messages.

On November 20, 2015, it was revealed that Zack Stanton, a congressional page from 2001 until 2002, was the source of the transcripts provided to ABC and The Washington Post.

== Physical contact ==
In early October 2006, two news organizations anonymously quoted former pages as saying that they had sexual liaisons with Foley after they turned 18 and 21, respectively.

=== Visits and meetings ===
On at least two different occasions, one in the summer of 2000 and one in 2002 or 2003, Foley allegedly visited the dormitory where pages live. On the first occasion, he drove up in his BMW automobile during a nighttime "mixer" party. Students came out of the dorm to talk with him and were warned away by an adult supervisor in the page program, who shooed them back inside.

In the second visit, Newsweek reported that Foley showed up at the dormitory after the 10 P.M. curfew, apparently drunk, and attempted to enter the building. He was reportedly turned away by a security guard.

Other meetings include a dinner with one former page, then 17, after which he invited the youth back to his hotel room and "touched his leg", and a visit by two pages in 1997 to Foley's Washington condo where they consumed pizza and soda. Another page reported that Foley repeatedly invited him out for ice cream.

=== Sexual liaisons ===
Though Foley is not alleged to have engaged in sexual relations with pages during the time of their service, he allegedly had, on at least two occasions, sexual relationships with ex-pages.

In communications with one of the pages, who chose to remain anonymous, Foley appeared to emphasize that while he assessed the attractions and orientation of pages, he waited until they had left the program to engage the youth in erotic activities: "I always knew you were a player but I don't fool around with pages."

The Los Angeles Times contacted the anonymous former page, according to a report in the paper on October 8, "after others identified him as someone whose contacts with Foley went beyond graphic messages." The page said that after leaving the page program, he began receiving instant messages from Maf54, Mark Foley's chat username, that quickly became provocative in nature. According to the Times:

In the messages, Maf54 described how years earlier, he had looked to see whether the former page had an erection in his tight white pants while the then-teenager was working near the congressman. Maf54 also speculated about the sexual attributes of other males in the same page class, including the observation that one young man was "well hung." ...

In one 2000 message, Maf54 inquired about the length and direction of the youth's erection.

"I always thought you were gay," Maf54 commented.

"Is it obvious?" the former page asked.

The ex-page said that in the fall of 2000, when he was 21 years old, he engaged in sexual intercourse with Foley at the congressman's Washington residence. According to the former page's account, "[t]he two had wine and pizza on a backyard patio and then retired to a spare bedroom."

Another former page told ABC News that Foley arranged a sexual liaison with him but only after he turned 18.

== Foley's response ==
After the initial e-mails had been publicized, Foley's office confirmed that Foley had sent the messages but said they were innocuous, and accused his election opponent of orchestrating a smear.

Shortly after being questioned by ABC about the more explicit IMs – and before they had been publicly revealed – Foley resigned from Congress. The congressman issued a statement, saying, "I am deeply sorry and I apologize for letting down my family and the people of Florida I have had the privilege to represent."

Kirk Fordham, chief of staff to representative and National Republican Congressional Committee chairman Tom Reynolds of New York, and former chief of staff to Foley, said that he was with Foley when ABC confronted him with the explicit IMs. Fordham said that he asked Foley if they were authentic, and that Foley replied, "Probably." According to Newsweek, Foley "knew he was finished." Fordham then visited GOP headquarters to inform Hastert and Reynolds; he returned with a one-sentence resignation letter that Foley signed. A short time later, Foley submitted his resignation to Governor Jeb Bush and left the capital.

Once the scandal broke in full, Foley had virtually no chance of staying in Congress. Hastert and Reynolds let it be known that if Foley did not sign the resignation letter, they would have sought his expulsion from the House. Polls showed him losing badly to his Democratic challenger, businessman Tim Mahoney.

On October 2, Foley checked himself into a rehabilitation clinic for alcoholism. On October 3, Foley's lawyer stated, "Mark Foley has never, ever had inappropriate sexual contact with a minor in his life. He is absolutely, positively not a pedophile." He also stated that Foley himself was a victim of sexual assault by an unnamed clergyman as a child, that the inappropriate conversations were the result of a secret alcohol problem and primarily occurred while Foley was intoxicated, and that Foley is gay. Previously, when confronted with speculations that he was gay, Foley labeled them "revolting and unforgivable". However, Foley's sexuality had been an open secret in Washington for many years.

== Alleged molestation of Foley ==
After demands to do so, Foley privately identified the priest he alleged had abused him as a child. However, the public revelation of his identity, Anthony Mercieca, a 69-year-old Catholic priest now living in Malta, came through the investigative reporting of the Sarasota Herald-Tribune.

Parallel to Foley's disclosure, Mercieca held several interviews in which he described a two-year relationship with Foley from when the youth was a 13-year-old altar boy at Sacred Heart Roman Catholic Church in Lake Worth, Florida, until he was 15. He told the Sarasota Herald-Tribune about a number of intimate occasions that the priest claimed "Foley might perceive as sexually inappropriate", such as "massaging Foley while the boy was naked, skinny-dipping together at a secluded lake in Lake Worth and being naked in the same room on overnight trips." Mercieca hinted at an even more intimate event, which he claimed took place while he was under the influence of tranquilizers and alcohol, and which he could not clearly recollect, and that he taught Foley "some wrong things" related to sex, which he did not specify.

In a separate AP interview, he recounted that: "We were friends and trusted each other as brothers and loved each other as brothers. It was not what you call intercourse ... There was no rape or anything ... Maybe light touches here or there." He told a Florida TV station that it was not abuse, which is against someone's will: "He seemed to like it, you know? So it was sort of more like a spontaneous thing." The Archdiocese of Miami issued a statement apologizing to Foley for "the hurt he experienced" from the priest's "morally reprehensible" actions, and suspended Mercieca's faculties.

According to Mercieca, he had last seen Foley at a dinner meeting 18 years before, in a restaurant in Lake Worth. When asked whether he had anything to say to Foley, Mercieca said, "Remember the good times we had together, you know, and how well we enjoyed each other's company." He added, "Don't keep dwelling on this thing, you know?" Mercieca could not be prosecuted for his activities with Foley because the relevant statutes of limitations had expired, and the Palm Beach County state attorney's office "cannot conduct an investigation because Foley has declined to press charges."

A childhood friend of Foley's, Jon Ombres, confirmed the close friendship between the two, and suggested that there may have been a second priest, sexually interested in youths and with whom Foley was on good terms, active in the parish at that time. As of October 25, Mercieca faced new accusations, leveled by a former altar boy who claims having been abused by him in the seventies at the age of twelve. Mercieca, speaking through his lawyer, denied the second accusation, claiming that it is "at best as a figment of the imagination and at worst a malicious fabrication." On July 18, 2007, the Roman Catholic Archdiocese of Miami settled a lawsuit brought against it by the former altar boy. The terms of the settlement were not disclosed. The lawsuit had sought more than $10,000,000 in damages.

== Other Congressmen ==
As an apparent result of the Foley scandal, allegations of inappropriate contact with pages have been made against other congressmen.

=== Jim Kolbe ===
Two allegations were made against another Republican congressman, Jim Kolbe. The first to be made public involves a 1996 rafting trip Kolbe took on the Colorado River with two recently graduated, 17-year-old male pages, as well as Kolbe's sister, five of his staffers, and Gary Cummins, the deputy superintendent of the Grand Canyon National Park at the time. An anonymous participant told NBC that he was "creeped out" by the attention Kolbe paid to one of the pages, adding that Kolbe did a lot of "fawning, petting and touching" on the teenager's arms, shoulders, and back. The page in question declined to address that statement, telling NBC, "I just don't want to get into this ... because I might possibly be considered for a job in the administration." He did say that he had a "blast" on the trip and did not report anything improper to his parents or page officials afterward.

On the day that the Justice Department investigation of the first allegation was made public, October 12, 2006, Kolbe's spokeswoman Korenna Cline said that his office had not been contacted by the Justice Department or House Ethics Committee. She then resigned abruptly, saying "I have decided to pursue another job opportunity and today is my last day."

In the second allegation, a page told the FBI and House Clerk's office that he was "uncomfortable with a particular social encounter" including physical contact that occurred in 2001 when he and Kolbe were alone. The page was 16 at the time and had not reported the incident.

These allegations were also the topic of a conference call between the members of the House Page Review Board, which referred the matter to the House Ethics Committee since it did not have jurisdiction over Congressmen.

Trandahl, speaking as the former House Clerk, reportedly stated that Kolbe was one of a small group of "problem members" of Congress who frequently socialized with House pages in inappropriate ways.

=== Unnamed congressman ===
Congressman Jerry Weller (R-IL) sent the House Page Board and House Ethics Committee a report that a page he sponsored was "inappropriately invited to a social function by another congressman." He declined to make any further details public.

== Congress ==
Other leaders whose roles have been criticized include Reynolds, John Boehner, John Shimkus, Ken Mehlman, and Sue W. Kelly.

Also significant in the scandal is the office of Clerk of the House of Representatives, the chief administrative officer of the United States House of Representatives. The Clerk is responsible for the effective administration of all personnel matters, including those relating to the House pages. The two Clerks of the House during the scandal were Jeff Trandahl and Karen Haas; the latter was elevated to the position from being floor assistant for Hastert after Trandahl resigned on November 18, 2005.

=== Knowledge before September 2006 ===
At least 13 Republican Congressmen or congressional staffers acknowledged that they knew of the five initial e-mails before they were made public: Majority Leader John Boehner (Ohio); Reynolds; Alexander and John Shimkus (Ill.) (Chairman of the House Page Board); Hastert, Mike Stokke, Ted Van Der Meid, and Tim Kennedy in Hastert's office; Paula Nowakowski, Boehner's chief of staff; Trandahl; Royal Alexander, Alexander's chief of staff (no relation) and another Alexander staffer, Danielle Savoy, Fordham; Kolbe, and Kolbe's staffer.

While at first no Democratic congressman or staffers were shown to have had such knowledge, later investigation suggested that the House Democratic Caucus and the Democratic Congressional Campaign Committee were also aware of the initial emails.

==== 1995–1999 ====
Kurt Wolfe, the journalist who first outed Foley in The Advocate in 1996, said that one of the original independent sources he found to corroborate Foley's orientation was an ex-page. An adult by the time of his meeting with Wolfe, he described having been "the recipient of many inappropriate sexual communications from Foley" while a minor. Wolfe contacted Foley's office for comment, and was rebuffed. Nevertheless, he asserts about Foley's staff: "They were notified."

Several current and former congressional employees recalled Foley approaching young male pages at parties, going back many years, and say that warnings about him were commonly passed around. Generally speaking, he was "known to be extraordinarily friendly in a way that made some [pages] uncomfortable." According to Mark Beck-Heyman, who served as a Republican page in summer 1995, "Almost the first day I got there I was warned. It was no secret that Foley had a special interest in male pages." He alleged that many people on Capitol Hill, including Republican staffers, "have known for over 11 years about what was going on and chose to do nothing." Tony Perkins, president of the conservative Family Research Council, said on MSNBC that "I've had people now on staff that used to be pages, and it was widely known to watch out for him, that he liked boys ... so pages were warned to watch out for him."

==== 2000–2004 ====
On October 9, The Washington Post reported that in 2000, a former page showed Kolbe messages from Foley that made the page feel uncomfortable. According to The Washington Post, these messages were sexually explicit, a characterization that Kolbe's press secretary denied. The Washington Post reported that Kolbe confronted Foley about the messages. Kolbe's press secretary said that unspecified "corrective action" was taken. Kolbe later said that the former page, whom Kolbe had sponsored, told him of a "creepy" e-mail from Foley, but did not show it to him. Kolbe said that, through his staff, he passed the complaint on to Trandahl and to Foley's office. Kolbe said that he did not confront Foley about the matter and that he recalled that the incident had taken place later than 2000.

Another page, Matthew Loraditch, stated that, when he served in 2001, pages had been warned to "watch out for Congressman Mark Foley," though he later softened his description of the warning.

Newsweek reported that in 2002 or 2003, Foley showed up at the pages' dormitory after the 10 P.M. curfew, apparently drunk, and attempted to enter the building. He was reportedly turned away by a security guard. Newsweek stated that Trandahl notified Fordham (then Foley's chief of staff and later Congressman Tom Reynolds' chief of staff) and that Fordham, in turn, contacted Scott B. Palmer, Hastert's chief of staff, describing Foley's behavior generally but not mentioning the incident at the pages' dormitory. This account further stated that Fordham followed up a couple of days later with Palmer, who replied that he had "informed the Speaker" and "dealt with it" by talking to Foley directly.

Testifying under oath before a House ethics committee panel, Fordham said that months before he left Foley's office in January 2004, he had told Hastert's office about the conduct by Mark Foley with male teenage pages. Palmer has categorically denied that meeting between him and Fordham ever took place: "What Kirk Fordham says happened did not happen." However, on October 6 a second congressional staffer corroborated Fordham's version of the events, claiming that in 2003 a meeting took place between Palmer and Foley, specifically to discuss complaints about his behavior towards pages.

Trandahl, testifying to a closed session of the House Ethics Committee, reportedly also confirmed that Hastert's office was notified of Foley's behavior in 2003. He stated that he regularly updated Hastert's counsel and floor manager, Ted Van Der Meid, about a "problem group of members and staff who spent too much time socializing with pages outside of official duties." One member of the group was Foley.

==== 2005–2006 ====
Representative Rodney Alexander (R-LA) stated that he learned of the five initial e-mails from Foley to the 16-year-old page from Louisiana in the fall of 2005, after a news reporter brought the matter to his attention. Alexander spoke to the boy's parents, who did not wish to pursue the matter beyond stopping the e-mails. Alexander's chief of staff met with Mike Stokke, Hastert's deputy chief of staff in the fall of 2005. They met with Trandahl. Contradictory statements have made it unclear whether they actually read the e-mails. Trandahl then met with Shimkus, and Shimkus and Trandahl met privately with Foley, and Shimkus told him to cease contact with the page. The other two congressional representatives on the House Page Committee (including the only Democrat) were not informed, and no formal investigative or disciplinary action was taken.

After testifying in closed session before the House Ethics Committee, Representative Alexander also announced that "There are many people who know what we know, and have known it for a lot longer period of time than we've known." He did not name names publicly, however.

In the spring of 2006, Representative Alexander mentioned the case to Boehner, who referred him to Representative Reynolds (R-NY), chairman of the National Republican Congressional Committee. Both Reynolds and Boehner say that they notified Hastert; he says he can't recall that and questions whether it is true.

When the story became public, Hastert said that he had learned of the e-mails only when the news broke in late September 2006. Reynolds said on September 30 that he had spoken with Hastert about the matter early in 2006 after being approached by Alexander to discuss the matter. According to The Washington Post, "Republican insiders said Reynolds spoke out because he was angry that Hastert appeared willing to let him take the blame for the party leadership's silence." Hastert's office said that Hastert did not "explicitly recall" that conversation but said he did not dispute it.

Boehner told The Washington Post that he had learned of the emails in the spring. Boehner initially said that he informed Hastert, and that Hastert assured him "we're taking care of it." After Hastert denied knowledge to the press, Boehner retracted his statement, stating that he could not recall the conversation. Boehner later stated that he was "99 percent" sure he had informed Hastert.

=== House Page Board ===
A board consisting of three House members and two congressional staffers, chaired by Shimkus, supervises the House page program. The staffers, who are automatic members, are the House Clerk and the House Sergeant At Arms.

Although Shimkus was aware of the five initially reported e-mails in 2005, he did not inform the rest of the board aside from Trandahl. Shimkus said he "was asked to keep this in confidence" because the parents of the page didn't want the incident publicized. The other two representatives on the board, Dale Kildee (D-MI) and Shelley Moore Capito (R-WV) did not find out about them until the scandal broke in October 2006. Kildee said that he was "very upset" that he had not been informed of the e-mails. He said, "I should have been told. The whole House Page Board should have been told." Capito said that she would have recommended stronger action had she been made aware of the original e-mails.

There are separate supervisors for the Republican and Democratic pages. Peggy Sampson has supervised Republican pages since 1986, and several former pages say that she warned them about Mark Foley. Wren Ivester is the supervisor of Democratic pages. No Democratic pages have said they were warned about Foley, and several contacted by ABC News said they had not been told about him. Both supervisors testified before a closed session of the House Ethics Committee on October 11, 2006.

On October 16, 2006, the Board held a conference call to discuss allegations in the Kolbe incident in 1996 (discussed above).

=== Role of Leadership members ===
==== Dennis Hastert ====
Hastert claimed at first that he had learned of the e-mails only when the news broke on September 29, 2006 and repeated this declaration on October 5. Two other top leaders in the House, Boehner and Reynolds, however, have stated that they told Hastert about the Foley emails in the spring of 2006. Boehner added that Hastert replied that the complaint "had been taken care of", and confirmed his account under oath before the House Ethics Committee. A September 30 statement by the Speaker's office said that Hastert did not "explicitly recall" the conversation with Reynolds but "has no reason to dispute" it.

Hastert's office concedes, in its own chronology, that his top staffers Mike Stokke (deputy chief of staff), Ted Van Der Meid (legal counsel) and a lower placed assistant named Tim Kennedy were told about the Foley emails by Rep. Alexander's chief of staff in November 2005. They deny that Scott Palmer knew about the emails until they were made public, though. Hastert is unusually close to his top staffers; he lives with Palmer and Stokke, who have worked for him for decades, and they commute back to Illinois together on weekends.

Fordham, who had been Foley's chief of staff until January 2004, and chief of staff to Congressman Reynolds from 2005 until he resigned on October 4, 2006, said that he told Scott Palmer about Foley's interest in pages in 2003, that Palmer met with Foley, and that Hastert knew about the meeting. Palmer replied that "What Kirk Fordham said did not happen", but on October 6 a second congressional staffer corroborated Fordham's account, claiming that a 2003 meeting took place between Palmer and Foley specifically to discuss complaints about his behavior towards pages.

At an October 2 press conference, Hastert called the IMs "vile and repulsive." He also said that had Foley not resigned, he would have demanded his expulsion from the House. He also condemned Foley for misleading him, Shimkus and the organizations with whom he'd worked to strengthen laws against exploiting children. Hastert requested a criminal investigation of the explicit IMs, but not of the earlier, less explicit e-mails exchanged between Foley and the page sponsored by Alexander. The following day, on The Rush Limbaugh Show Hastert claimed that leadership "took care of Mr. Foley. We found out about it and asked him to resign. He did resign."

On October 3, The Washington Times called for Hastert's resignation as Speaker over his handling of the scandal. Prominent conservatives also called for Hastert's resignation, such as David Bossie, president of Citizens United; conservative columnist Richard Viguerie; and conservative columnist Michael Reagan, son of former President Ronald Reagan. Hastert has rebuffed these calls to resign, arguing he did nothing wrong and is committed to investigating the scandal and leading Congress. Boehner also defended Hastert in a letter to the editor of The Washington Times. A conference call on October 2 with about 100 House Republicans had no calls for a resignation.

On October 5, Hastert accepted responsibility for the scandal but refused to step down. He said, "I haven't done anything wrong" and re-affirmed that he had only recently learned about any problems involving Foley and the pages: "I learned of this last Friday ... I don't know who knew what or when – that's why we've asked for an investigation."

In October 2015, Hastert entered a guilty plea to a felony related to his structuring of bank withdrawals to avoid bank reporting requirements. Hastert admitted that this financial misconduct was related to "hush money" payments to underage male victims of Hastert's sexual assaults, which occurred over a period of decades when Hastert worked as a high school teacher and wrestling coach.

==== Tom Reynolds ====
Reynolds issued a statement that he had spoken with Hastert about the matter early in 2006. According to The Washington Post, "Republican insiders said Reynolds spoke out because he was angry that Hastert appeared willing to let him take the blame for the party leadership's silence." Hastert did not "explicitly recall" that conversation but said he did not dispute it.

Reynolds commented on his role in the events, "I don't think I went wrong at all ... I don't know what else I could have done."

The question of Reynolds's role in the scandal nearly cost him his seat in the November 2006 election. According to conservative columnist Robert Novak, Reynolds convinced a reluctant Foley to run for re-election even after finding out about his questionable e-mails. Reynolds also contributed $5,000 to Foley's re-election fund, apparently after finding out about his behavior. Indeed, Reynolds won reelection by only four percentage points despite representing a district that had been altered specifically to protect him.

On October 4, 2006, Fordham, Reynolds's chief of staff, resigned after newspapers reported that he had asked ABC News not to report the text of the sexually explicit instant messages. ABC reported that Fordham had offered to give them an exclusive on the resignation if they withheld the text of the IMs. Fordham had previously served as Foley's chief of staff. Hastert's spokesman replied, "What Kirk Fordham said never happened."

It has been reported that prior to the public scandal, Reynolds, together with Karl Rove, urged Foley to run for reelection in 2006, despite Foley's reluctance.

==== John Shimkus ====
Shimkus said "that in late-2005 he learned – through information passed along by Alexander's office – about an e-mail exchange in which Foley asked about the youngster's well-being after Hurricane Katrina and requested a photograph." Shimkus advised Foley not to contact the boy again, and Foley assured him he would not. Shimkus did not share the information with Reps. Kildee or Capito, the other members of the Page Board.

Shimkus later described Foley as a "slimeball", and regretted not pressing further. Unlike Reynolds, he had little difficulty winning re-election.

==== John Boehner ====
Boehner told The Washington Post that he learned of the inappropriate contact in the spring. Boehner initially said that he informed Hastert, and that Hastert assured him "we're taking care of it." After Hastert denied knowledge of this conversation, Boehner retracted, saying that he could not recall it. On October 3, Boehner once again recanted, this time telling a radio interviewer "I believe I talked to the Speaker and he told me it had been taken care of."

== Investigations ==
=== House Ethics Committee ===
Late on September 29, 2006, House Minority Leader Nancy Pelosi (D-CA) offered a resolution to direct the House Ethics Committee to create a subcommittee to investigate Foley and the Republican leadership. Boehner moved to immediately refer Pelosi's resolution to the Ethics Committee without further debate and the House unanimously agreed.

On October 5, 2006, the House Ethics Committee met and established a subcommittee to investigate the page sex scandal. The House subcommittee was composed of Representatives Doc Hastings (R-WA), Howard Berman (D-CA), Judy Biggert (R-IL), and Stephanie Tubbs Jones (D-OH). Former FBI Director Louis Freeh was retained as a special advisor. The committee opened an expansive investigation into the unfolding scandal on 5 October 2006 by approving nearly four dozen subpoenas for witnesses and documents.

The Ethics Committee had no power over Foley, as he was no longer a member of Congress at its formation. As a result, the committee's stated focus was on the "conduct of House members, officers and staff related to information concerning improper conduct involving members and current and former pages".

On December 8, 2006, the committee reported the investigation's conclusion, finding Hastert and other Republican leaders negligent, but not in violation of any House rules. The panel did not recommend any sanctions for their failure to stop Foley. The investigation validated Trandahl's and Fordham's reports and concluded that Hastert's chief of staff first learned of Foley's conduct in 2002 or 2003, and that Hastert's chief counsel had been aware of concerns for nearly a decade.

=== Justice Department ===
On October 13, 2006, a Justice Department spokesman confirmed that they had opened a preliminary investigation of the official rafting trip taken in 1996 by Kolbe with two 17 year-old former pages.

On October 1, 2006 in a letter to U.S. Attorney General Alberto Gonzales, Hastert requested an investigation into Foley's actions, specifically into the explicit IMs that had recently surfaced. Hastert's letter also requested investigation of persons who knew or had possession of these messages but did not report them to the appropriate authorities. That day, the FBI stated that it was assessing whether any federal laws had been violated.

On July 21, 2006, the director of the organization Citizens for Responsibility and Ethics in Washington (CREW) received copies of the e-mails from one of her staff members, who had received it two days earlier. On that day, CREW turned over the e-mails to the FBI; however, the FBI found insufficient grounds to open a criminal investigation. After the scandal broke, CREW criticized the FBI's lack of action. An anonymous source in the FBI told The Washington Post that CREW was their original source for the e-mails but had provided only heavily redacted copies, even after a request for complete copies, and would not identify their source. The FBI source also alleged that CREW had held the emails since April before turning them over. However, the department spokesman would not comment on the record. CREW's executive director, Melanie Sloan, replied that they had provided unedited e-mails to the FBI, and that her original e-mails to the FBI proved that. She formally requested that the Justice Department's Inspector General investigate the FBI's assertions.

The resulting Inspector General's report concluded that (1) CREW had received the emails in July and turned them over to the FBI within two days; (2) the FBI's decision not to pursue charges against Foley based on the initial emails did not constitute misconduct; but (3) the FBI probably should have referred the case to the House Page Board or other authorities based on what they received.

== Responses ==
Mark Foley's actions were almost universally condemned. The actions and inactions of Hastert and other members of the Republican House leadership were widely condemned by Democrats and some Republicans. On September 29, 2006, Rep. Pelosi (D-CA) criticized Republican leaders, who, she said, "have known of the egregious behavior of Congressman Mark Foley, yet were prepared to adjourn [Congress] tonight without an Ethics Committee investigation." DCCC Chairman Rahm Emanuel noted that Alexander had first gone to Reynolds, who was in charge of political operations, and said, "That's to protect a member [of Congress], not to protect a child." When Foley's sexually explicit instant messages became public, a few members of the Republican Party condemned his actions. They voted unanimously with House Democrats to refer the matter to the House Ethics Committee for investigation. Speaker of the House Dennis Hastert also demanded a criminal investigation by writing the Attorney General asking for a full investigation both into Foley's actions and into the possibility that earlier clues were not properly acted upon by Congressional officials, representatives, the media, and the FBI.

Some members of the gay community voiced concerns over media coverage of the Mark Foley scandal, since the scandal linked homosexuality and pederasty, while others condemn the media's complicity in permitting Foley to remain closeted. Many Republican candidates had announced that they were either returning contributions from Foley's campaign or contributing any Foley money received in the last several years to charity. The NRCC, however, has opted to keep a $100,000 contribution made to it by Foley in July 2006, after the first, "overly friendly" e-mails had become known to House Republican leaders. Carl Forti, an NRCC spokesman, has said the campaign organization would gladly accept the $2.7 million campaign war chest that Foley controlled upon his resignation, should Foley choose to turn it over. On October 5, 2006, the parents of the former page from Louisiana, who initially complained about the e-mails to Rep. Alexander, issued a public statement. They described their son's actions as courageous, and described him as a hero for reporting the e-mails. They supported Alexander, calling his conduct "beyond reproach". They complained about media harassment, and asked to be left alone, requesting respect for their privacy.

== Political impact ==
=== Post-scandal polls and commentary ===
A Time poll reported that two-thirds of those aware of the scandal believe that the Republican leadership in Congress attempted a cover-up. According to Fox News, an internal Republican poll conducted in the wake of the scandal shows potentially disastrous election results for Congressional Republicans if Hastert remains as Speaker of the House. The unnamed Republican source is quoted as saying "The data suggests Americans have bailed on the speaker, and the difference could be between a 20 seat loss and 50 seat loss." For Democrats to regain control of the House, they had to post a net gain of 15 seats in the 2006 midterm elections.

The National Review, a conservative magazine, called the scandal helpful for Democrats campaigning to regain control of one or both houses of Congress, and said it could have a greater impact than the Jack Abramoff scandals since "a GOP pederasty scandal" is thought to resonate more strongly with the public than one involving the purchase of favors.

On October 3, the Washington Times called for Hastert's resignation as Speaker over his handling of the scandal. Other prominent conservatives called for Hastert's resignation, such as David Bossie, president of Citizens United; conservative columnist Richard Viguerie; and conservative columnist Michael Reagan, a son of former President Ronald Reagan.

A Pew Research Center poll released on October 5 indicated no significant change in registered voters' party support; before and after the scandal broke, Democrats had 51 percent support in the upcoming congressional elections, while Republicans had 38 percent support. In later polls, however, Republicans hemorrhaged support; a USA Today/Gallup survey published October 10 showed Democrats enjoying a 23-point advantage over Republicans, with an 11-point gain for Democrats, and a 12-point loss for Republicans, since a poll released on September 17.

An October 5, 2006 public opinion poll found that 27% of American thought Hastert should remain Speaker, with 43% thinking he should resign from Congress entirely.

On October 6, political scientist and analyst Stuart Rothenberg wrote that the scandal may have helped to "set the stage for a blowout of cosmic proportions next month" in the November elections. University of Virginia political scientist Larry Sabato, on October 5, wrote in the Crystal Ball that "the congressional page scandal [had] joined leaked reports of poor progress in Iraq and Bob Woodward's portrayal of President Bush as a clueless war wager to deliver Bush and Republicans their worst, most catastrophic week of 2006."

=== Effect in Foley's district ===
In Florida, State Representative Joe Negron was picked to fill Foley's spot in the November elections. The Democratic nominee for the seat was Tim Mahoney. Florida law prohibited Foley's name from being removed from the ballot at the time of his withdrawal from the race, but Republicans hoped that voters would recognize that a vote for Foley would transfer to Negron as a substitute candidate. Nevertheless, Boehner noted that because of the procedures in Florida, "to vote for this candidate, you have to vote for Mark Foley. How many people are going to hold their nose to do that?" Negron used the slogan, "Punch Foley for Joe", having the double meaning of officially voting for Foley in order to really elect Negron as well as evoking images of physically striking the offending member of Congress. Foley's Republican-held seat was regarded as unlikely to change hands before the scandal broke, but CQPolitics changed its rating of the race from Safe Republican – where it had stood since July – to Leans Democratic in early-October. On Election Day, Mahoney won the seat.

=== Effect in Reynolds's district ===
Reynolds, the head of the NRCC, who knew of some Foley e-mails before the scandal became public, released an ad apologizing to his constituents. He was thought to have a safe seat. Shortly before the scandal broke, a SurveyUSA poll found Reynolds' Democratic challenger Jack Davis unexpectedly trailing by only two percentage points (43%-45%), a statistical tie. A subsequent SurveyUSA poll taken a week after the first poll show Davis now leading 50-45, outside of either poll's margin of error. A Zogby telephone poll conducted on October 4–5, after the scandal had been in the news for a week, found Reynolds trailing 33-48. Nevertheless, Reynolds won the race.

=== Effect on other congressional races ===
Within a week of the scandal breaking, five candidates ran campaign ads in reaction to the scandal. Democratic House candidates Patty Wetterling in Minnesota's 6th District, Mary Jo Kilroy in Ohio's 15th, Maxine Moul in Nebraska's 1st district, and Baron Hill in Indiana's 9th came out with ads connecting their opponents to the Republican leadership and, by association, Mark Foley.

== Page program ==
On October 2, 2006, Representative Ray LaHood (R-IL) called for the page program to be temporarily suspended. He stated that "this is a flawed program. The fact that a member of Congress is sending e-mails to a page and that he can get away with it [shows that] obviously there are problems." Two more Representatives, Jon Porter (R-NV) and Kay Granger (R-TX) also supported LaHood's recommendation to suspend the page program until an outside team could evaluate its security protocol. Hastert announced on October 5, 2006 that he was launching an investigation to evaluate and make improvements to the page program.

== Legal issues ==
Foley, as chair of the House Caucus on Missing and Exploited Children, was an expert on law concerning sex with minors. His pursuit of young former pages, in many cases, carefully avoided illegality.

=== Age of consent ===
In the vast majority of states of the United States, the overall age of majority is either 18 years of age or higher. However, age of consent for sex is almost always lower than the overall age of majority, and varies by state (it is 16 in the District of Columbia and either 16 or 17 in 36 other states).

The e-mail that first came to light was sent to a 16-year-old former page in Louisiana, where the age of consent is 17. However, the age of consent is relevant only in cases where there has been physical, sexual contact. Foley has not been accused of any such contact with this youth, and has specifically denied sexual contact with any minor through his lawyer. On another occasion he offered a narrower denial of "inappropriate sexual contact with a minor".

The minimum age for House pages is 16. Two former pages have told news organizations that Foley arranged sexual liaisons with them but only after they turned 18 and 21 respectively. On October 19, anonymous law enforcement sources said that FBI interviews with at least 40 former pages involved in the case had not found evidence of any sex crimes by Mark Foley. The FBI identified a pattern where Foley began courting the pages at age 16 or 17 but waited until they turned 18 to have sex.

In the state of Florida, the age of consent on the internet and in person is 18. If Foley were convicted of breaking the law in Florida, he would be a sex offender, although the Constitutionality of such a law is probably in dispute in light of issues dealing with interstate commerce and the challenge in having one age of consent law for sex.

=== Sexual communications with minors ===
Legislation that Mark Foley helped enact, the Adam Walsh Child Protection and Safety Act, covers certain Internet communications with minors under 18. Federal law makes it a crime to solicit sex with a minor below the age of consent. However, federal law does not prohibit an individual from engaging in explicit, sexual communications with a minor per se.

Some state laws criminalize certain communications with minors, even in the absence of physical sexual contact. In Florida, which Foley represented in Congress, the age of consent is 18 and attempts to seduce a minor are illegal. Louisiana makes it a felony to have sexually explicit communications over the Internet with anyone under 17. California has a law against sending sexually suggestive communications to anyone under 18.

The initially publicized explicit IMs were made with two pages or former pages beginning when they were 16 or 17, and continuing until after their 18th birthdays. One of the pages told the FBI that his contacts with Foley led to two meetings, including a dinner in San Diego in October 2002, when the page was 17. After dinner, the page said, Foley invited him back to his hotel room and "touched his leg", but nothing untoward happened beyond that in a 20-minute visit.

=== Alcohol use ===
In one instant message conversation, Foley appears to invite a minor to his house to consume alcohol. It is unknown if this ever happened, but it is a crime to provide alcohol to a person under the legal drinking age. In the District of Columbia, the law states that "anyone who purchases or furnishes alcohol to a [person below the drinking age] faces a fine of up to $1,000 and/or imprisonment for up to 180 days." In addition, an individual under the age of 21 is prohibited in the District of Columbia from consuming alcoholic beverages.

=== No charges ===
Almost two years after Foley abruptly resigned over sexually explicit messages he sent to a teenage House page, law enforcement authorities in Florida concluded there was insufficient evidence to charge him with breaking Florida laws.

== See also ==
- 1983 congressional page sex scandal
- Reaction formation
- United States House election, 2006
