= Mark Foley =

American politician (born 1954)

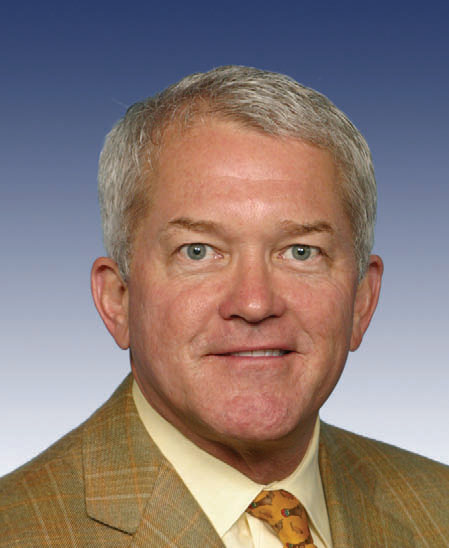
- Foley c. 2005

Member of the U.S. House of Representatives from Florida's 16th district
- In office January 3, 1995 – September 29, 2006
- Preceded by: Tom Lewis
- Succeeded by: Tim Mahoney

Member of the Florida Senate from the 35th district
- In office November 1992 – November 1994
- Preceded by: Jack D. Gordon
- Succeeded by: Tom Rossin

Member of the Florida House of Representatives from the 85th district
- In office November 1990 – November 1992
- Preceded by: Frank Messersmith
- Succeeded by: Mimi McAndrews

Personal details
- Born: Mark Adam Foley; September 8, 1954 (age 72) Newton, Massachusetts, U.S.
- Party: Republican
- Domestic partner: Layne Nisenbaum (m. 1984; died 2012)
- Education: Palm Beach State College

Mark Adam Foley (born September 8, 1954) is an American former politician who served as a member of the United States House of Representatives. He served from 1995 until 2006, representing the 16th District of Florida as a member of the Republican Party, before resigning due to revelations that he had sent sexually explicit messages to teenaged boys who had served as congressional pages in what came to be known as the Mark Foley scandal.

Foley resigned from Congress on September 29, 2006, acting on a request by the Republican leadership after allegations surfaced that he had sent suggestive emails, as well as sexually explicit instant messages, to teenage boys who had formerly served and were at that time serving as Congressional pages. As a result of the disclosures, the Federal Bureau of Investigation (FBI) and the Florida Department of Law Enforcement conducted investigations of the messages to find possible criminal charges. Each ended with no criminal finding. In the case of the Florida Department of Law Enforcement, FDLE commissioner Gerald Bailey with the closure of the case stated that the "FDLE conducted as thorough and comprehensive investigation as possible considering Congress and Mr. Foley denied us access to critical data." The House Ethics Committee also conducted an investigation into the response of the House Republican leadership and their staff to possible earlier warnings of Foley's conduct.

== Early career ==
Foley was born in Newton, Massachusetts, the son of Frances and Edward Joseph Foley Jr., a teacher and civic activist. Foley served in the Florida House of Representatives 1990–1992 and then in the Florida State Senate 1993–1994.

== Congressional career ==
=== Early House career ===
Foley was elected to the U.S. House in 1994 with 58 percent of the vote, defeating Democrat John Comerford. He was re-elected in 1996 with 64 percent of the vote against Democrat Jim Stuber and again in 1998 (this time without opposition). He was re-elected in 2000 with 60 percent of the vote against Democrat Jean Elliott Brown and Reform Party candidate John McGuire. Constitution Party candidate Jack McLain was his only opponent in 2002. He was re-elected in 2002 with 79 percent of the vote and in 2004 with 68 percent of the vote.

Foley was a moderate Republican. He spent most of his tenure in Congress as a member of the powerful House Ways and Means Committee. He was also the first public figure to imply that Vice President Al Gore claimed to have invented the Internet. On March 12, 1999, Reuters reported Foley as saying, "The Vice President is mistaken. The only thing he has ever invented is another tax. He did not invent the Internet but he sure did tax it."

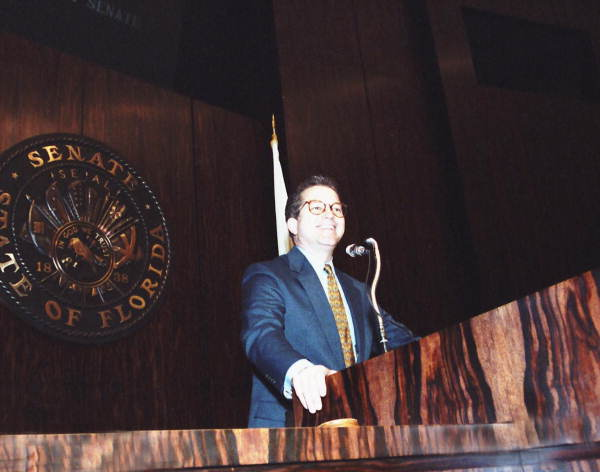
Foley in 1994

In late 2000, Foley played a large role in aiding George W. Bush during the Presidential election recount controversy in Florida.

In 2006, Foley was a member of the Republican House leadership, serving as deputy whip.

=== Senate campaign ===
In 2003, Foley was widely considered the Republican front-runner for Bob Graham's Senate seat, especially after Graham had announced his retirement. However, longstanding rumors surfaced that Foley was either homosexual or bisexual and was in a long-term homosexual relationship. The story was initially published only in local and gay press; then the New Times broke the story in the mainstream press. Other alternative press rivals, including the New York Press, then addressed the topic. Foley held a press conference to denounce the "revolting" rumors and stated that his sexual orientation was unimportant, but did not specifically deny the rumors. A few weeks later, he withdrew his candidacy, saying his father's battle with cancer had caused him to reassess his perspective on life (the seat was later won by Republican Mel Martinez). Foley had raised $3 million in campaign contributions before withdrawing.

=== Actions in Congress ===
==== Legislation regarding pornography and sexual offenses ====
In the House, Foley was one of the foremost opponents of child pornography. Foley had served as chairman of the House Caucus on Missing and Exploited Children. He introduced a bill, coined the "Child Modeling Exploitation Prevention Act of 2002" to outlaw websites featuring sexually suggestive images of preteen children, saying that "these websites are nothing more than a fix for pedophiles." As it was written, the bill would have prohibited commercial photography of children and it failed due to the unmanageable burden it would have presented to the legitimate entertainment industry. In June 2003 he wrote letters to the governor and attorney general of Florida, asking them to review the legality of a program for teenagers of a Lake Como nudist resort in Land o' Lakes, Florida.

Foley's legislation to change federal sex offender laws was supported by the National Center for Missing and Exploited Children, America's Most Wanted host John Walsh and a number of victims' rights groups. President Bush signed it into law as part of the Adam Walsh Child Protection and Safety Act of 2006.

Foley also succeeded in getting a law passed that allows volunteer youth-serving organizations like the Boy Scouts of America and Boys and Girls Clubs to have access to FBI fingerprint background checks.

=== Other social issues ===
Foley's stances on many social issues differ from his party's leadership. Although he is Catholic, Foley was a member of The Republican Majority For Choice, which does not believe there should be any restriction on abortion. He has, however, advocated alternatives such as adoption and sexual abstinence. He also supported the Patriot Act, the death penalty and strict sentencing for hate crimes. Foley was a member of Christine Todd Whitman's It's My Party Too and the Republican Main Street Partnership. According to the National Journal's calculations, in 2005, Foley's voting record on social policy issues was moderate.

==== Other domestic issues ====
Foley helped secure the first-ever financial commitment from Congress for the preservation of Florida's Everglades.

Foley helped pass legislation that expedites the deportation of non-violent criminal aliens serving their sentences in federal prisons; and helped eliminate federal prohibitions on notifying a campus community when a student commits a violent crime.

Foley worked to pass legislation to help surviving heirs of Holocaust victims who have been unable to collect on life insurance policies owed to them.

== Scandal and resignation ==
On September 28, 2006, ABC News Chief Investigative Correspondent Brian Ross reported that in 2005, Foley had sent email messages from his personal AOL account to a former Congressional page, asking the page to send a photo of himself to Foley, among other things. Foley's office confirmed that Foley had sent the messages but said it has a practice of asking for photos of individuals who may ask for recommendations and that the page had requested a recommendation.

The original news report prompted another page to come forward and on September 29, 2006, ABC News reported that it had seen excerpts of sexually explicit instant messages allegedly sent by Foley. The instant messages made repeated references to sexual organs and acts.

Kirk Fordham, chief of staff to Tom Reynolds (chairman of the fundraising National Republican Congressional Committee) and former chief of staff to Foley, said that he was with Foley on September 29, 2006, when ABC confronted him with the explicit messages before they were publicized. Fordham then informed Reynolds and Speaker of the House Dennis Hastert; he returned with a one-sentence resignation letter that Foley signed. Hastert and Reynolds made it clear that if Foley didn't resign, he would be expelled from the House. That same day, Foley tendered his resignation to Hastert as well as Florida Governor Jeb Bush. Foley said in a statement, "I am deeply sorry and I apologize for letting down my family and the people of Florida I have had the privilege to represent." Once the news report became more widely known, Foley's chances of retaining his seat in Congress were limited. Hastert said in an October 2 press conference that he would have demanded Foley's expulsion from the House had he tried to stay in office. (Ironically, Hastert himself was described by a Federal District Court judge as a "serial child molester" and jailed in 2016 for illegally structuring bank withdrawals in an attempt to hide his own sexual abuse of four high school boys during his pre-Congressional career). Even if Foley had tried to get his seat back, polls showed him losing badly to his Democratic opponent, Tim Mahoney.

More pages came forward, alleging a history of inappropriate conduct by Foley dating back at least 10 years. Foley had been warned about the matter in 2005 by another House Republican and the House Clerk. Through his lawyer, Foley insisted he was not a pedophile and asserted that he had not "had contact" with a minor.

Foley also explained that he had a drinking problem and had made the communications while intoxicated. He checked himself into a rehab clinic on October 2, 2006. His lawyer revealed that Foley claimed he was molested by a clergyman when he was between the ages of 13 and 15 adding that "Mark Foley wants you to know he is a gay man." Federal authorities said the explicit messages could result in Foley's prosecution, under some of the same laws he helped to enact.

Foley resigned from the U.S. Congress on Friday, September 29, 2006.

There was widespread criticism of Republican leaders for their response to earlier warnings and inconsistencies in their statements. In particular, many called for Hastert to resign, including some conservative voices such as the editorial page of The Washington Times.

On October 19, 2006, the Sarasota Herald-Tribune stated that a disgraced abusive homosexual Catholic priest named Anthony Mercieca told the newspaper about an intimate two-year relationship he had with Foley when the congressman was a teenage altar boy living in Lake Worth, Florida. The priest is retired and living in Malta. He acknowledged getting naked in saunas and possible "light touching", but denied contact of a sexual nature.

Florida officials closed the investigation of Foley, stating they found "insufficient evidence" to file criminal charges since the page was over the age of consent (16).

== November 2006 election ==
Shortly after Foley resigned, the Republican Party of Florida named State Representative Joe Negron to run as the Republican replacement candidate to face Mahoney. In accordance with Florida election law, Foley's name remained on the ballot. Votes cast for Foley in the November election counted towards Negron's total. Mahoney called for a full investigation of Foley's actions. Foley's district had been held by Republicans since its creation in 1973 (it was the 10th District until 1983 and the 12th District until 1993.) In an effort to use the scandal to his benefit, Negron used the slogan "Punch Foley for Joe!", instructing voters to "punch" Foley's name on the ballot to chastise him and support Negron.

Negron narrowly lost the election to Tim Mahoney. Negron had 47.7 percent and Mahoney had 49.5 percent. The seat fell back into Republican hands in the 111th Congress with the 2008 election of Tom Rooney.

== Post-congressional life ==
After leaving Congress, Foley entered the real estate business in Palm Beach, Florida. He also came out publicly and was in a relationship with Palm Beach dermatologist Layne Nisenbaum until Nisenbaum's death in 2012. On September 22, 2009, Foley debuted as host of his own radio show, "Foley on Politics", on Seaview AM 960 in North Palm Beach, Florida.

After several years removed from the public eye, Foley resurfaced as a supporter of Donald Trump during the 2016 presidential election, appearing behind him in a crowd at one of his rallies.

== Electoral history ==
Florida's 16th congressional district: Results 1994–2006
Year	Democrat	Votes	%	Republican	Votes	%	Third party	Party	Votes	%
1994	John Comerford	88,653	42%	Mark Foley	122,760	58%				
1996	Jim Stuber	98,827	36%	Mark Foley	175,714	64%				
1998	(no candidate)			Mark Foley^{1}						
2000	Jean Elliott Brown	108,782	37%	Mark Foley	176,153	60%	John McGuire^{2}	Reform	7,556	3%
2002	(no candidate)			Mark Foley	176,171	79%	Jack McLain	Constitution	47,169	21%
2004	Jeff Fisher	101,247	32%	Mark Foley	215,563	68%				
2006	Tim Mahoney	115,832	50%	Joe Negron^{3}	111,415	48%	Emmie Ross	None	6,526	3%

^{1}According to Florida law, the names of those with no opposition are not printed on the ballot and no totals need be submitted.
^{2}Write-in and minor candidate notes: In 2000, write-ins received 9 votes.
^{3}Mark Foley's name was the one on the ballot, however, as noted above.

== See also ==
- Ego-dystonic sexual orientation
- List of federal political sex scandals in the United States
- List of federal political scandals in the United States
- List of LGBT members of the United States Congress

U.S. House of Representatives
Preceded by Tom Lewis	Member of the U.S. House of Representatives from Florida's 16th congressional district 1995–2006	Succeeded by Tim Mahoney
U.S. order of precedence (ceremonial)
Preceded by Karen Thurman as Former U.S. Representative	Order of precedence of the United States as Former U.S. Representative	Succeeded by Jim Davis as Former U.S. Representative
