= Missing children panic =

American moral panic

The missing children panic (1979 – mid 1980s) was a moral panic concerning child abduction and murder by strangers in the United States. The event was triggered after the abduction of Etan Patz in 1979 and the kidnapping and murder of Adam Walsh in 1981, with subsequent media reports exaggerating and misrepresenting child abduction statistics. The panic popularized the misleading claim that 1.5 million children per year disappeared or were abducted in the United States, introduced the stranger danger narrative into public discourse and intensified tropes relating to the sexual predation and murder of boys by homosexuals in American culture, especially after the publicization of gay serial killers Ottis Toole, John Wayne Gacy and Randy Kraft.

Amid the event, a nationwide campaign against child abduction in the United States led to U.S. president Ronald Reagan signing the Missing Children Act (1982) and the Missing Children's Assistance Act (1984), that founded the national system for recording missing persons in 1982 and the National Center for Missing & Exploited Children in 1984.

The panic also led to the production of multiple child sexual abuse-themed movies, documentaries and television shows, including Adam (1983), Something about Amelia (1984), Kids Don't Tell (1985), The Atlanta Child Murders (1985), Children of the Night (1985), When the Bough Breaks (1986) and Nightmare on Elm Street (1984), the last of which featured fictional child killer character Freddy Krueger. It also popularized the usage of milk cartons to publicize cases of missing children. Public interest on the topic of missing children started to decrease after 1985.

== History ==
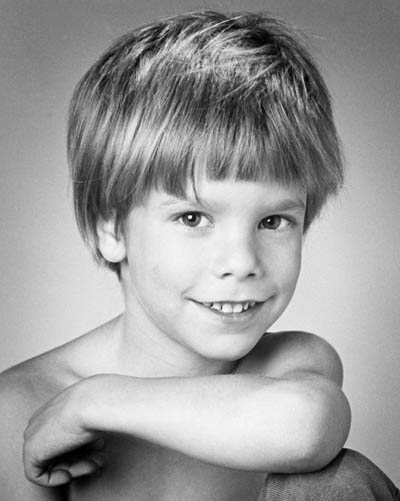
Patz in 1978

Although child abduction cases have been registered for centuries in United States history, reports about children being abducted by strangers rarely reached national attention before the 1980s. Following the abduction of Etan Patz on his way to school in 1979, and subsequently the kidnapping and murder of Adam Walsh in 1981, public interest in the topic began to increase. The same phenomenon happened in parallel in the United Kingdom, where sensational media coverage of the topic led the public to assume that child abduction and murder rates were increasing in Britain as well. In the United States, claims were recurringly made that 1.5 million children disappeared per year in the country.

In 1982, U.S. president Ronald Reagan signed the Missing Children Act. Two years later, he signed the Missing Children's Assistance Act, which founded the National Center for Missing & Exploited Children.

Despite the panic having popularized the trope of very young boys being abducted by strangers, forensic statistics have shown that over 95% of cases of "missing children" involved runaways instead of kidnappings, and that most cases of "nonfamily abductions" involved teenage girls, with the NISMART reporting that 69% of "stereotypical kidnappings" involved girls instead of boys. And despite claims that thousands or over a million children went missing each year, statistics have also shown that "only" a few hundred children are abducted by strangers in any given year. Furthermore, public perceptions of the missing children issue were further distorted by the general public's failure to distinguish stranger abductions from parental abductions.

By the mid-1980s, opinion polls reported an increased public awareness of child molestation, kidnapping and pornography among the general public. Public interest on the topic of missing children started to decrease after 1985.

== Cultural effects ==
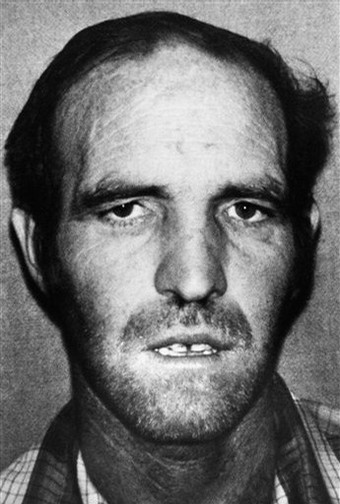
Toole in 1983

Public anxiety and news media reports about child abductions, which mainly focused on young boys being kidnapped and sexually assaulted by adult males, fueled the trope of "predatory homosexuals" in the 1980s, especially after gay serial killer Ottis Elwood Toole confessed to murdering Walsh in 1983. In 1984, U.S. senator Mitch McConnell, then working as a judge, blamed the increase of "child tragedies" on the openness of "homosexual activities" of the time.

The missing children panic popularized the "stranger danger" narrative in American culture, which was communicated through popular children's and adult's entertainment. It also popularized the placement of missing children's pictures on milk cartons.

In 1983, Reagan marked May 25, the day of Patz's disappearance, as the National Missing Children's Day.

=== Media productions ===
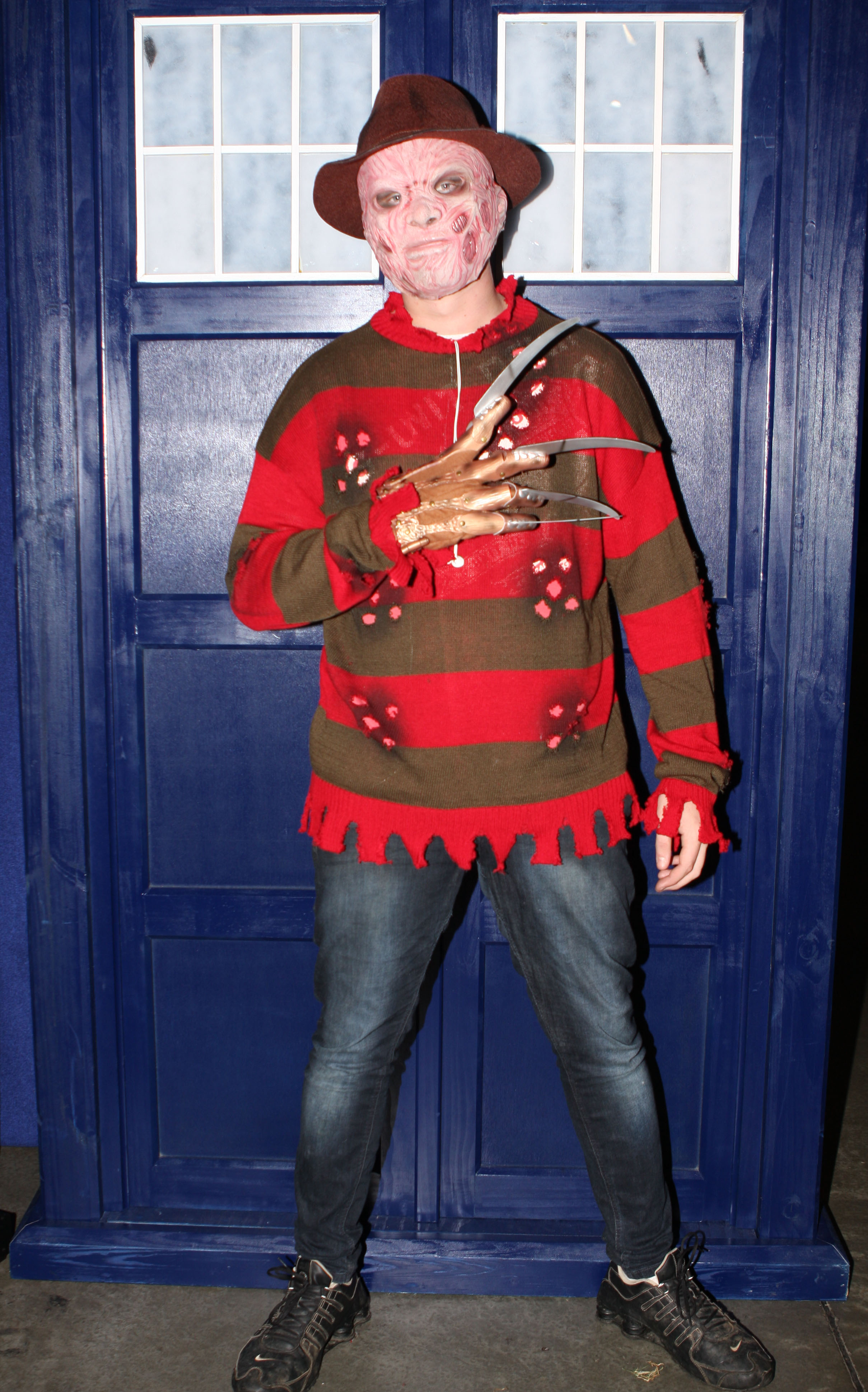
Freddy Krueger cosplayer at a pop culture event, 2014

Amid multiple televised reports of missing children cases, the 1980s saw an increase of TV news programs styled after the tabloid press, as well as true-crime shows that often failed to distinguish facts from fiction. A new wave of child sexual abuse-themed shows then started airing on television, including the NBC-produced Silent Shame (1984), Something about Amelia (1984), Kids Don't Tell (1985), The Atlanta Child Murders (1985), Children of the Night (1985), The Children of Times Square (1985), South Bronx Heroes (1986). Two movies centered on apprehending pedophiles, When the Bough Breaks and A Child's Cry, were released in 1986. In 1984, Nightmare on Elm Street was released, featuring fictional character Freddy Krueger, a demonic child molester who resurrected after being killed by a group of vigilantes.

In 1983, a TV docudrama titled Adam, which documented Walsh family's activism for increasing child abduction awareness, reached an estimated audience of 38-50 million people in October of the same year before airing again in 1984. The first airing of the show featured an appearance from then-president Ronald Reagan at its conclusion, who said "maybe your eyes can bring them home" to the viewing audience as photographs of fifty-four missing children appeared behind him.

In children's entertainment, popular children's authors Stan and Jan Berenstain released The Berenstain Bears Learn About Strangers in 1985, and fictional character Winnie-the-Pooh was depicted avoiding strangers in Too Smart for Strangers (1985).

== See also ==
- Child abduction scare of 2002
- Satanic panic
- Poisoned candy myths
- Missing-children milk carton
- Mods and rockers
- Black Horror on the Rhine
- Cadet scandal
