= Michael Baisden =

American entertainer

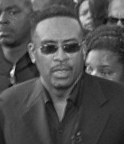
- Born: Chicago, Illinois, U.S.
- Presenting career
- Show: The Michael Baisden Show
- Network: AURN
- Show: Baisden After Dark
- Network: TV One
- Country: United States of America
- Website: http://www.michaelbaisden.com

Michael Baisden is the former host of The Michael Baisden Show. The show was syndicated by Baisden Media Group in partnership with SupeRadio and AURN (American Urban Radio Networks). The show airs weekday afternoons. The show was previously syndicated by Cumulus Media and was heard in over 78 media markets nationwide with over 8 million listeners daily. His media career began when he left his job driving trains in Chicago to self-publish Never Satisfied, and began touring the country selling books out of the trunk of his car.

Baisden is a NY Times best-selling author with over 2 million books in print, hosted two national television shows, and has produced three films.

== Producer and filmmaker ==
Baisden has produced: two national stage plays (based on Baisden's novels); Love Lust & Lies, an award-winning documentary dealing with relationships and sexuality based on the perspectives of people of color; two seminar tapes, Relationship Seminar and Men Have Issues Too; and a web-based community portal. In 2011 Baisden produced, wrote, and directed the documentary Do Women Know What They Want?

== Motivational speaker ==
Baisden has toured the US as a motivational speaker with his Love, Lust & Lies Relationship Seminar Series. As well as numerous national Baisden Live Tours, he has also produced international Island Jam events in Jamaica.

== Radio career ==
Baisden got his start in radio as an unpaid afternoon drive-time host for 98.7 KISS FM in New York City, taking the station rating from number nine to number one in the time slot. The show debuted nationally in 2005.

Baisden's show recently returned to national radio in January 2017. The flagship station for the show was WALR-FM (Kiss 104.1 FM) in Atlanta, Georgia once the show was returned to national radio, but on November 27 of the same year, WALR-FM revamped its line-up and started producing local shows therefore getting rid of all syndicated shows.

=== Baisden After Dark ===
In 2007-08, Baisden hosted and co-produced Baisden After Dark, a late-night television talk show series on TV One. The show featured comedian George Willborn and musician Morris Day, who conducted the house band.

== Social activism and community leadership ==
On September 20, 2007, Baisden spearheaded the Jena Six March in Jena, Louisiana. In January 2008, he endorsed Barack Obama for president of the United States.

=== Michael Baisden Foundation ===
The Michael Baisden Foundation is a non-profit organization formed to promote literacy and to provide mentors for at-risk youths.

The Michael Baisden Foundation's various projects include:

- Jena Six March
- Free Clinics
- One Million Mentors National Campaign to Save Our Kids
- Gospel for Teens / Mama Foundation Auditions - Honorary Judge
- Partnership with Black and Missing Foundation
- Mentoring Brothers partnership with Big Brothers Big Sisters & Black Fraternities

== Appearances ==
- 6th Annual Jazz in the Gardens - Host
- Soul Train Awards - Presenter
- Heart and Soul Magazine Awards - Presenter
- CNN's Black in America, 2008
- 39th Annual NAACP Image Awards - Presenter

== Awards ==
- Dr. Martin Luther King Jr. Keepers of the Dream Award
- Key to the City, Shreveport, LA
- Key to the City, Alexandria, LA
- Key to the City, Dallas, TX
- Key to the City Florence, AL
- Key to the City Patterson, LA
- Mayor's Key - Columbia, SC
- The NCNW Savannah Youth Section 2010 Mir Award - Savannah, GA
- Key to the City - Columbus, GA
- Columbus, Georgia Proclamation - Friday, March 12, 2010 "Michael Baisden 'One Million Mentors' Day"
- City of Mobile, Alabama Proclamation - Wednesday, March 10, 2010 as "Michael Baisden Day"
- Black Achievers Determined to be Different (BADD) Certificate of Membership - "The BADD Men Brotherhood"
- Honorary Mayor-President of the city of Baton Rouge, Parish of East Baton Rouge - February 25, 2010
- Honorary Citizen of the City of Florence, Alabama
- Key to the City - Florence, LA
- Key to the City - Mobile, AL
- Key to the City - Tampa, FL
- Key to the City - Morgan City, LA
- Key to the City - Lafayette City, LA
- Key to the City - Monroe, LA
- Key to the City - Baton Rouge, LA
- I Make the Difference Award
- City of Orlando, FL Proclamation - "March 4, 2010 as 'One Million Mentor's Campaign to Save Our Kids' Day"
- Congratulations and Commendation from State Rep. Herbert B. Dixon - Louisiana House of Representatives
- Key to the City, St. Mary Parish - Louisiana
- Mentoring Brothers In Action Inspiration Award Presented by Big Brothers Big Sisters and Max Miller, Big Brothers Big Sisters Co-Chief Executive Officer

== Books ==
- Raise Your Hand If You Have Issues (2014)
- Maintenance Man II (2012)
- The Maintenance Man Collectors Edition (2012)
- Do Men Know What They Want? (2011)
- God's Gift to Women (2003)
- Men Cry In The Dark (1999)
- Never Satisfied How & Why Men Cheat (1997)
