= Missing person =

Person who has disappeared and whose status as alive or dead cannot be confirmed

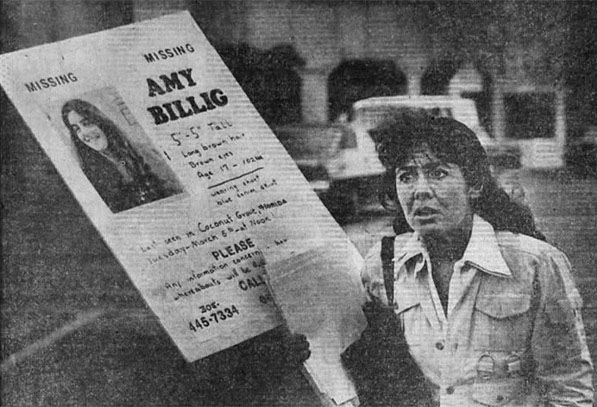
Susan Billig, mother of Amy Billig, holds a placard appealing for information regarding her daughter nine days after her disappearance.

A missing person is a person who has disappeared and whose status as alive or dead cannot be confirmed as their location and condition are unknown. A person may go missing through a voluntary disappearance, or else due to an accident, crime, or death in a location where they cannot be found (such as at sea), or many other reasons. In most parts of the world, a missing person will usually be found quickly. Criminal abductions are some of the most widely reported missing person cases.

By contrast, some missing person cases remain unresolved for many years. Laws related to these cases are often complex since, in many jurisdictions, relatives and third parties may not deal with a person's assets until their death is considered proven by law and a formal death certificate issued. The situation, uncertainties, and lack of closure or a funeral resulting when a person goes missing may be extremely painful with long-lasting effects on family and friends.

== Reasons ==
People disappear for a variety of reasons. Some choose to intentionally disappear, for others disappearance is accidental (e.g. getting lost) or it is forced on them (abduction/imprisonment).

Reasons for disappearing may include:

- To escape domestic abuse.
- Leaving home to live in an unknown place under a new identity.
- Becoming the victim of kidnapping.
- Seizure by the government authorities (Military, law enforcement, government) and imprisoned / detained indefinitely
- Suicide in a remote location or under an assumed name
- Victim of murder (body disguised, destroyed, or hidden).
- Mental illness or other ailments such as Alzheimer's disease
- Death by natural causes
- Becoming lost accidentally in remote areas.
- Sold into slavery, serfdom, sexual servitude, or other unfree labor.
- To avoid discovery of a crime or apprehension by law-enforcement authorities.
- Joining a cult or other religious organization that forbids contact with the outside world.
- To avoid war or persecution during a genocide.
- As a consequence of war – e.g. missing in action, impressment, collateral damage
- To escape famine or natural disaster.
- Death by floods, flash floods, debris flows, hurricanes, tsunamis and tornadoes.
- Aviation accident where no wreckage is found or ship wreck where no wreckage is found
- Desertion during war or absent without leave (AWOL).
- To avoid conscription.
- To avoid paying debts.

== Legal aspects ==
A common misconception is that a person must be absent for at least 24 hours before being legally classed as missing, but this is rarely the case. Law enforcement agencies often stress that the case should be reported as early as possible. In fact, it is extremely crucial to report a missing person as soon as possible. This is in order to take immediate action in the vital first 48 hours after a person is declared missing. In these 48 hours, the police will be able to interview any eyewitnesses and get any suspect descriptions while it is still fresh in their minds. In most common law jurisdictions, a missing person can be declared dead in absentia (or "legally dead") after seven years. This time frame may be reduced in certain cases.

== Searches ==
In most countries, the police are the default agency for leading an investigation into a missing person case. Disappearances at sea are a general exception, as these require a specialized agency such as a coast guard. In many countries, such as the United States, voluntary search and rescue teams can be called out to assist the police in the search. Rescue agencies such as fire departments, mountain rescue and cave rescue may also participate in cases that require their specialized resources. Police forces such as Lancashire Constabulary stress the need to try to find the person quickly, to assess how vulnerable the person is, and to search places that the person may have links to.

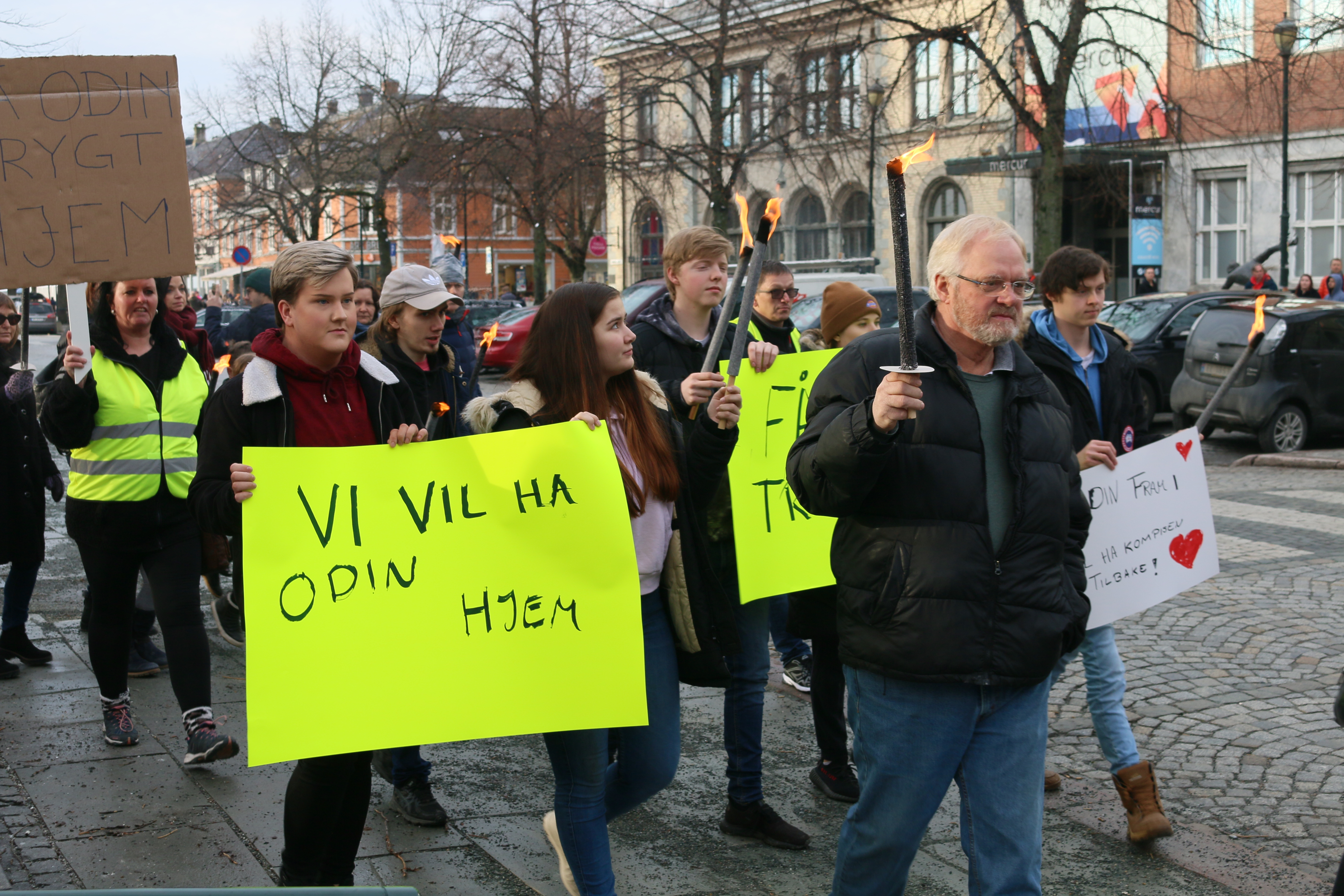
Torchlight procession on 23 of February 2019 in Trondheim, Norway for the search of missing boy Odin Andre Hagen Jacobsen who has been missing since 18 November 2018. The people protest to demand from the police to strengthen their efforts and for the media to give the case more coverage.

== Media coverage ==
=== Ethnicity and socioeconomic status ===
An alleged racial disparity between the American news media response when a white individual goes missing and when a black individual goes missing has been proposed by some. According to Seong-Jae Min & John C. Feaster, throughout history the news media has provided white individuals, particularly affluent women, more comprehensive news coverage than people of color (missing white woman syndrome). The authors have noted that while a correlation has been established, they have no clear causation. They suggest that the socioeconomic status or attractiveness of a child may also influence their chances of appearing in the news media.

American journalist Howard Kurtz, best known for his analysis of the media, supported the conclusion that a person's race and socioeconomic status impacted media coverage. He gave the kidnappings of Elizabeth Smart and Alexis Patterson as an example—when Smart, a young affluent Caucasian girl from Utah, went missing, the media coverage was worldwide. After several months of searching, she was found alive. In comparison, when Patterson, a young black girl from Wisconsin, went missing, she received only local news coverage and is still missing to this day.

Within the U.S., there are several organizations that bring awareness and equality to missing people of color, such as the Black and Missing Foundation, a non-profit organization founded in 2008. The Black and Missing Foundation's goal is to provide resources to families of missing people of color and educate minority groups on personal safety. Our Black Girls, a non-profit run by Erika Marie, shares the stories of missing and murdered women of color. Deidra Robey leads a non-profit organization called Black and Missing but not Forgotten, which provides assistance in spreading awareness about missing persons.

It has also been speculated by Kristen Gilchrist that, in Canadian news media, Aboriginal women receive three and a half times less coverage than white women. Their articles were found to be shorter and less detailed—with an average word count for white women of 713 compared to 518 for Aboriginal women—and less likely to be front-page news. Depictions of the Aboriginals were also described by Gilchrist as more "detached" in tone.

=== Emphasis on stranger kidnappings ===
Some of the most widely covered missing person cases have been kidnappings of children by strangers; however these instances are rare. In most parts of the world, criminal abductions make up only a small percentage of missing person cases and, in turn, most of these abductions are by someone who knows the child (such as a non-custodial parent). A child staying too long with a non-custodial parent can be enough to qualify as an abduction. During the year 1999 in the United States, there were an estimated 800,000 reported missing children cases. Of these, 203,900 children were reported as the victims of family abductions and 58,200 of non-family abductions. However, only 115 were the result of a "stereotypical" kidnapping by a stranger or a slight acquaintance to the child, who abducted them with the intent to murder, hold permanently or for ransom. This number aligns with confirmed 38 non-familial abductions that triggered an Amber alert in 2018.

== International statistics and efforts ==
The Wall Street Journal reported in 2012 that: "It is estimated that some 8 million children go missing around the world each year." The BBC News reported that of the children who go missing worldwide, "while usually the child is found quickly the ordeal can sometimes last months, even years." The issue of child disappearances is increasingly recognized as a concern for national and international policy makers especially in cross border abduction cases, organized child trafficking and child pornography as well as the transient nature of unaccompanied minors seeking asylum.

According to the UNHCR, over 15,000 unaccompanied and separated children claimed asylum in the European Union, Norway and Switzerland in 2009. The precarious situation of these children makes them particularly vulnerable to human rights abuses, rendering their protection critical, given the high risks to which they are exposed. Most of these children are boys aged 14 years and over, with diverse ethnic, cultural, religious and social backgrounds mainly originating from Afghanistan, Somalia, Angola, the Democratic Republic of Congo, Eritrea and Iraq.

Among exploiters taking advantage of the children, are sometimes their own relatives who gain benefit in the form of social or family allowances. According to research done by Frontex, some types of threats faced by unaccompanied migrant minors include sexual exploitation in terms of pornography, prostitution and the internet; economic exploitation including forced donation of organs; criminal exploitation including drug smuggling and child trafficking including forced marriage and begging.

Criminal networks are heavily involved with human trafficking to the EU and this includes also exploitation of minors as manpower in the sex trade and other criminal activities. According to a 2007 UNICEF report on Child Trafficking in Europe, 2 million children are being trafficked in Europe every year. Child trafficking occurs in virtually all countries in Europe. There is no clear-cut distinction between countries of origin and destination in Europe. Trafficking in children has been perceived mainly in connection with sexual exploitation, but the reality is much more complex. Children in Europe are also trafficked for exploitation through labor, domestic servitude, begging, criminal activities and other exploitative purposes.

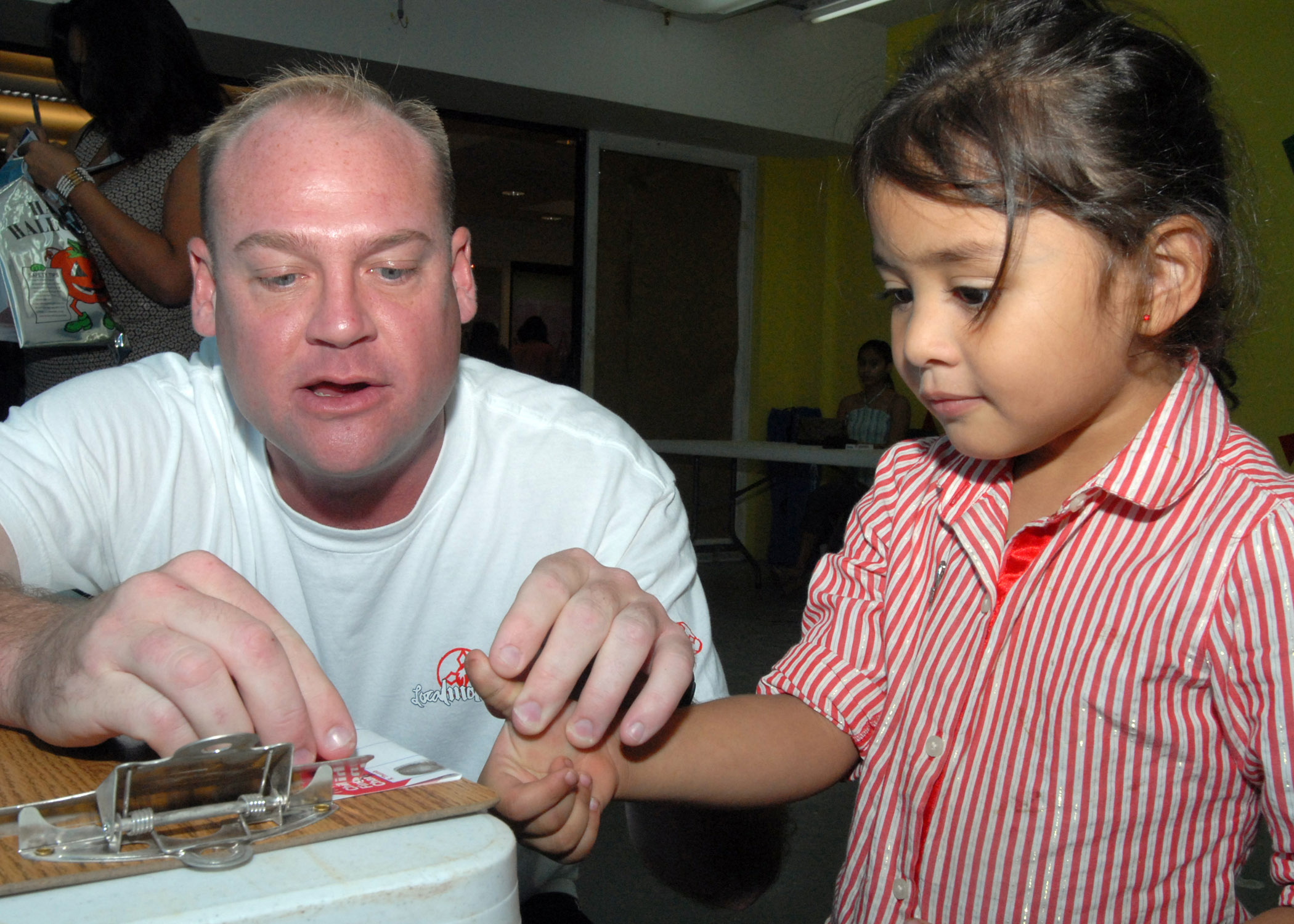
A sailor assigned to Naval Computer Telecommunications Station (NCTS) Guam, fingerprints Alexis Kosak during the 11th annual Project KidCare event held at Agana Shopping Center. The project's goal is to assist local authorities with locating and recovering missing children and inform the public about ways to prevent child abduction.

In the report, UNICEF also warns that there is a dramatic absence of harmonized and systematic data collection, analysis and dissemination at all levels without which countries lack important evidence that informs national policies and responses. Missing Children Europe, the European federation for missing children, aims to meet this need. The CRM system is expected to have a clear impact on the way hotlines are able to work together and collect data on the problem of missing children.

The British Asylum Screening Unit estimated that 60% of the unaccompanied minors accommodated in social care centres in the UK go missing and are not found again. In the UK these open centres, from where minors are able to call their traffickers, act as 'human markets' for the facilitators and traffickers who generally collect their prey within 24 hours of arrival in the UK. According to the CIA out of the 800,000 people trafficked annually across national borders in the world, up to 50% are minors.

The United Nations is operating a Commission on Missing Persons that serves as an international coordination center and provides also statistical material regarding missing persons worldwide. The International Red Cross and Red Crescent Movement strives to clarify the fate and whereabouts of missing persons when loss of contact is due to armed conflict or other situations of violence; natural or man-made disaster; migration and in other situations of humanitarian need. It is also supporting the families of missing persons to rebuild their social lives and find emotional well-being.

== Laws and statistics by country ==
=== Austria ===
Austria has a competence center for missing persons. The police records the missing person's data, which is stored in the Austrian Search System (EKIS) and (automatically) in the Schengen Information System (SIS). In 2016, a total of 8,887 cases were processed and stored in the EKIS. Of these, 6,322 cases involved EU citizens, except for 44 resolved, and 2,565 non-EU citizens, except for 264 resolved. As of October 1, 2017, a total of 1,300 people were reported missing in Austria: 349 were women, 198 of whom were minors; 951 were male, of whom 597 were minors. The number of EU citizens who were stored in the EKIS as missing was between 400 and 500 at all times mentioned in 2015 to 2017. In 2017, 10,000 missing person reports were filed in Austria. As of May 1, 2018, 1,267 people had been reported missing, including 746 children and young people. Only 505 came from EU countries.

In January 2019, 1037 people were recorded as missing in the EKIS, in January 2020 884 people. Between 2016 and 2019, 85 percent of missing persons cases were resolved within a week, 95 percent within a month, 97 percent within six months and 98 percent within a year. In 2019, the KAP published a search in only 13 cases, the result of which was: eight alive, three dead, two still missing. The legal status of missing persons in Austria is regulated by the Declaration of Death Act (Todeserklärungsgesetz).

=== Australia ===
Over 305,000 people were reported missing in Australia from 2008 to 2015, which is estimated to be one person reported missing every 18 minutes. Around 38,159 missing person reports are made on average every year in Australia.

=== Canada ===
Royal Canadian Mounted Police missing child statistics for a ten-year period show a total of 60,582 missing children in 2007.

=== France ===
The file named Fichier des personnes recherchées (FPR) is a data collection of the French national police. It is also under the jurisdiction of the Ministry of the Interior and the Ministry of Defence.

=== Ireland ===
On May 26, 2002, a monument to missing persons was unveiled in County Kilkenny, Ireland by President Mary McAleese. It was the first monument of its kind in the world.

=== Jamaica ===
The founder of Jamaica's Hear the Children's Cry, child-rights advocate Betty Ann Blaine, asked the government to introduce missing-children legislation in Jamaica. She said in May 2015: "Jamaica is facing a crisis of missing children. Every single month, we have approximately 150 reports of children who go missing. That is a crisis because we are only 2.7 million people." She said her organization would work with the International Centre for Missing & Exploited Children (ICMEC) to recommend a model law to the Parliament of Jamaica.

=== Japan ===
It has been estimated that 100,000 Japanese people disappear annually. The term jōhatsu refers to people in Japan who purposely vanish from their established lives without a trace.

=== Latin America ===
In the 1970s and 1980s, almost all South American countries were ruled for a long time by right-wing military dictatorships. Most of them violently suppressed the opposition, usually with the secret kidnapping of unwanted people by unnamed members of the security forces.

While the families reported the disappearances, the victims were unjustly imprisoned, tortured and finally killed. In Argentina, they were loaded onto a plane and thrown into the sea. During the Argentina's military dictatorship (1976–1983), almost 30,000 people disappeared in this way, permanently and without leaving any trace.

=== Russia ===
During the Soviet era, forced disappearances of political opposition were commonplace, including imprisonment in gulags, torture, executions, and scientific experimentation.

According to a report by the Russian news agency TASS released in 2018, between 70,000 and 100,000 people go missing in Russia every year. About 25% of missing persons cases remain unsolved.

=== Switzerland ===
The cantonal police are responsible for reports of disappearances, which do not have specialized sections on the matter. The complaint can be filed one year after an event that can be linked to a danger to life or five years after the last sign of life of the interested person. If the person found by the authorities is of age, they can only inform other people with her consent.

Police search and emergency room costs are usually charged in part or in full to the applicants. Helicopter searches are particularly expensive. The insurance covers the costs if the situation was not caused by gross negligence, if there is a risk of death and if there is a reasonable chance of survival.

A relatively large number of people are lost in Switzerland due to accidents in alpine sports. In the event of melting glaciers, the police have issued instructions on how to deal with the bodies: photograph the finds, mark them, write down the coordinates and, if there is a risk that the finds or their location may not be found a second time, they must be picked up and delivered to the nearest police station.

=== United Kingdom ===
In the United Kingdom, The Huffington Post reported in 2012, over 140,000 children go missing each year, as calculated by the Child Exploitation and Online Protection Centre (CEOP) of the United Kingdom's National Crime Agency.

=== United States ===
Statistical information on missing persons in the US is provided by annual National Crime Information Center (NCIC) "Missing Person and Unidentified Person Statistics", annual Amber alert reports (minors only) and a comprehensive 2002 NISMART–2 study (covering children missing in year 1999). Amber alerts are reserved for confirmed abductions, where the child is at risk of serious injury or death. In 2018, 161 such alerts were issued, concerning 203 children. Of those 161 cases, 23 were found to be hoaxes or unfounded (minor was not missing), 92 were familial abductions, 38 were non-familial abductions and remaining 8 were runaways, lost, injured or unclassified. As of early 2019, 11 children were still missing and 7 were found deceased, with remaining children having been recovered. Notably, even though all states have operational AMBER program, 16 did not issue any alerts in 2018.

National Incidence Studies of Missing, Abducted, Runaway, and Thrownaway Children (NISMART–2) study by the U.S. Office of Juvenile Justice and Delinquency Prevention from 2002 comprehensively described missing children cases for year 1999. Data in the study was derived from a Law Enforcement Study, National Household Surveys of both Adult Caretakers and Youth (telephone interviews) and a Juvenile Facilities Study. The study considered a child missing when its whereabouts were unknown to the primary caretaker, with the result that the caretaker was alarmed for at least 1 hour and tried to locate the child. The estimated number of "caretaker missing children (reported and not reported)" was around 1.3 million, with about 800 thousand missing children estimated to have been reported. The estimated number of 800,000 missing children reports has been widely circulated in the popular press. The study's population included all approximately 70 million children in the US under the age of 18.

The 1,300,000 number is further broken down into approximately 33,000 nonfamily abductions, 117,000 family abductions, 629,000 runaway/thrownaway cases, 198,000 lost/injured, and 375,000 "benign explanations". The estimated number of nonfamily abductions is noted in the report to be "based on extremely small sample of cases" with 95% confidence interval of 2,000–64,000. While nonfamily abductions are defined as occurring when a nonfamily perpetrator takes a child by the use of physical force or threat of bodily harm, only 115 are considered stereotypical kidnappings, in which the child is detained overnight, transported at least 50 miles, held for ransom, abducted with intent to keep the child permanently, or killed. By the time the study data were collected, 99.8% of 1.3 million caretaker missing children had been returned home alive or located. Only 0.2% percent or 2,500 had not, the vast majority of which were runaways from institutions.

The United States' National Crime Information Center (NCIC) of the Federal Bureau of Investigation, mandated by the National Child Search Assistance Act, maintains its own "Missing Person File" to which local police report people for whom they are searching. The NCIC "Missing Person File" does have a category that is entitled "Juvenile" or "EMJ" (for: Enter Missing Person – Juvenile), but that category does not reflect the total number of all juveniles reported missing to the NCIC, for whom local police are searching. The NCIC also uses its own classification criteria; it does not use the above NISMART definitions of what constitutes a missing child. The NCIC data is limited to individuals who have been reported to the NCIC as missing, and are being searched for, by local police. In addition, the EMJ category does not contain all reports of juveniles who have been reported missing to the NCIC.

While the EMJ category holds records of some of the juveniles reported missing, the totals for the EMJ category excludes those juveniles recorded missing but who "have a proven physical or mental disability ... are missing under circumstances indicating that they may be in physical danger ... are missing after a catastrophe ... [or] are missing under circumstances indicating their disappearance may not have been voluntary". In 2013, the NCIC entered 445,214 "EMJ" reports (440,625 in the EMJ category under the age of 18; but 462,567 under the age of 18 in all categories, and 494,372 under the age of 21 in all categories), and NCIC's total reports numbered 627,911.

Of the children under age 18, a total of 4,883 reports were classified as "missing under circumstances indicating that the disappearance may not have been voluntary, i.e., abduction or kidnapping" (9,572 under age 21), and an additional 9,617 as "missing under circumstances indicating that his/her physical safety may be in danger" (15,163 under age 21). The total missing person records entered into NCIC were 661,593 in 2012, 678,860 in 2011 (550,424 of whom were under 21), 692,944 in 2010 (531,928 of whom were under 18, and 565,692 of whom were under 21), and 719,558 in 2009. A total of 630,990 records were cleared or canceled during 2013. At end-of-year 2013, NCIC had 84,136 still-active missing person records, with 33,849 (40.2%) being of juveniles under 18, and 9,706 (11.5%) being of juveniles between 18 and 20.

Each state has its own separate laws regarding publishing information about missing persons, with many states or counties posting alerts through official channels such as police websites.

=== European Union ===
116 000 is the European hotline for missing children active in all 27 countries of the EU as well as Albania, Serbia, Switzerland, Ukraine and the United Kingdom. The hotline was an initiative pushed for by Missing Children Europe, the European federation for missing and sexually exploited children. The Council of Europe estimates that about one in five children in Europe are victims of some form of sexual violence. In 70% to 85% of cases, the abuser is somebody the child knows and trusts. Child sexual violence can take many forms: sexual abuse within the family circle, child pornography and prostitution, corruption, solicitation via Internet and sexual assault by peers. In some of the cases, with no other available option, children flee their homes and care institutions, in search of a better and safer life.

Of the 50–60% of child runaways reported by the 116 000 European missing children hotline network, one in six are assumed to rough sleep on the run, one in eight resort to stealing to survive and one in four children are at serious risk of some form of abuse. The number of rough sleeping children across Europe is on the rise. These runaways fall into vulnerable situations of sexual abuse, alcohol abuse and drug abuse leading to depression. Runaways are 9 times likelier to have suicidal tendencies than other children. The Children's Society published a report in 2011 on recommendations to the government to keep child runaways safe.

== See also ==
- Code Adam
- Cold case
- International Centre for Missing & Exploited Children § Global Missing Children's Network
- International child abduction
- International Commission on Missing Persons
- International Day of the Disappeared
- Lists of people who disappeared
- Mattie's Call
- National Center for Missing & Exploited Children
- National Missing Children's Day
- Unreported missing
- The Vanished (podcast)
