= Missing-children milk carton =

Milk cartons showing a photo of a missing child

Missing-children milk cartons were public service advertisements printed on milk cartons by the National Child Safety Council in the United States. The cartons were distributed from December 1984 until the mid-1990s with intention to spread awareness on missing childrens' cases.

== History ==
Julie and Stanley Patz, the parents of Etan Patz, in 1985

During the late 1970s and 1980s in the United States, missing child cases garnered a great deal of news media attention. Chief among these were the disappearance of Etan Patz (1979) and the kidnapping and murder of Adam Walsh (1981), whose story was told in the 1983 television movie, Adam. These reports developed into a type of moral panic called "stranger danger". In 1984, the National Center for Missing and Exploited Children was founded.

In September 1984, Anderson Erickson Dairy in Des Moines, Iowa, began printing the photographs of two boys — Johnny Gosch and Eugene Martin — who went missing while delivering newspapers for the Des Moines Register. A similar milk-carton advertising program for missing children launched in Chicago, Illinois, with support from the police and statewide in California with support from the government.

In December 1984/January 1985, the nonprofit National Child Safety Council began a nationwide program called the Missing Children Milk Carton Program in the United States of putting photos of missing children on milk cartons. By March 1985, 700 of 1600 independent dairies in the United States had adopted the practice of publishing photos of missing children on milk cartons.

Etan Patz was one of the first missing children, and perhaps the most famous of them, to be sought with this strategy. In 1979, when the six-year-old boy went missing on the way to the schoolbus in Manhattan, there had been no system in the United States for tracking missing children nationwide. In 1985, Patz's photo was printed on milk cartons so that consumers purchasing milk at retail markets could be encouraged to look for the missing child.

=== Decline of use ===
The practice had begun to fade by the late 1980s and became obsolete when the Amber alert system was created in 1996. Today, AMBER Alerts use technology including notifications to mobile phones to give up-to-date information about potential child abductions.

Yvonne Jewkes and Travis Linnemann write in Media and Crime in the U.S.:

[T]he 'milk carton kids' campaign proved only marginally successful in helping to locate missing children (neither Patz nor Gosch nor Martin has been found), and was eventually abandoned as paper cartons were replaced by plastic jugs [...]

One of the more recent appearances of a face on a milk carton was when 16-year-old Molly Bish disappeared from her lifeguarding job in Massachusetts in 2000. Her parents became active in raising awareness about missing children. The girl's remains were found three years later, five miles from where she disappeared.

== Criticism ==
=== Overstating risk ===
The campaigns brought attention to the idea of "stranger danger". However, most of the abducted children pictured on milk cartons during the 1980s were taken by a noncustodial divorced parent, not a stranger.

=== Racially biased ===
Standup comedian Eddie Griffin performed a "White Kids on Milk Cartons" routine based on his recollection that the children featured on the cartons were usually White. This is not representative of the demographics of missing children. In 1997, while making up only 15 percent of the U.S. child population, Black (non-Hispanic) children were 42 percent of all nonfamily abductions. Hispanic children too were slightly more likely to be victimized this way than average, making up 16 percent of the population but 23 percent of nonfamily abductions. By contrast, White (non-Hispanic) children, at 65 percent of the population, were 35 percent of the nonfamily abductions. Natalie Wilson, cofounder of the Black and Missing Foundation, told Essence Magazine in 2014: "In the field, I've seen a majority of black missing children classified as runaways, who don't get Amber Alerts."

=== Legal issues ===
"There were some legal issues that arose in the mid-1980s about who could post a child's photo on a milk carton", said Donna Linder, Executive Director of Child Find of America.

=== Emotionally distressing ===
In the late 1980s, the pediatrician Benjamin Spock said that the cartons terrified small children at the breakfast table with the implication that they may also be abducted.

=== No data to track success ===
It is hard to say how successful these advertisements were, since "nobody kept any hard, verifiable numbers on the program as a whole." "What it did was raise the level of awareness," said Johnny Gosch's mother. "It didn't necessarily bring us tips or leads we could actually use."

=== Motivated by tax breaks ===
Historian Adam Garfinkle suggested a financial motive: "For many years companies got 'public service' tax breaks by putting pictures of 'missing children' on milk cartons."

== See also ==
- The Face on the Milk Carton, a 1990 novel featuring this concept that was the basis for a made-for-TV movie in 1995
- Wanted poster, a similar concept for seeking criminals
- Missing white woman syndrome
- Missing children panic
- List of photographs considered the most important
