= Ottis Toole =

American serial killer (1947–1996)

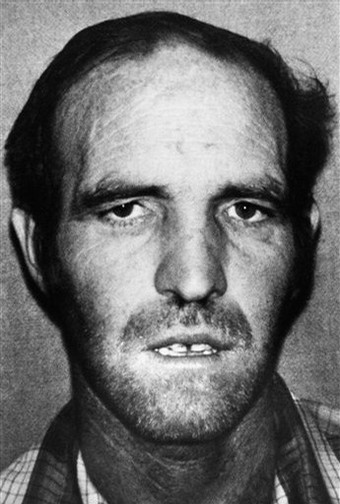
- Toole in a 1983 mugshot taken shortly after his arrest
- Born: Ottis Elwood Toole; March 5, 1947; Jacksonville, Florida, U.S.
- Died: September 15, 1996 (aged 49); Raiford, Florida, U.S.
- Resting place: Florida State Prison Cemetery, Starke, Florida, United States
- Occupations: Prostitute and vagrant
- Spouse: Novella Henry
- Convictions: Murder (6 counts); Arson
- Penalty: Two death sentences plus four life sentences, commuted to six life sentences without the possibility of parole (murder convictions); 20 years in prison (arson conviction)

Details
- Span of crimes: 1961–1983
- Country: United States
- States: Michigan, Florida and Texas
- Killed: 6 convicted, 1 suspected, hundreds more claimed
- Date apprehended: June 15, 1983
- Imprisoned at: Florida State Prison

Ottis Elwood Toole (March 5, 1947 – September 15, 1996) was an American serial killer who was convicted of six counts of murder. Like his companion Henry Lee Lucas, Toole made confessions which resulted in murder convictions, and which he later recanted. The discrediting of the case against Lucas for crimes for which Toole had offered corroborating statements created doubts as to whether either was a genuine serial killer or, as Hugh Aynesworth suggested, both were merely compliant interviewees whom police used to clear unsolved murders from the books.

Toole received two death sentences, but on appeal, they were commuted to life imprisonment. He died in his cell from cirrhosis, at age 49. Police attributed the 1981 murder of Adam Walsh to Toole on the basis of recanted statements. Lucas had backed Toole's confession to the Walsh murder, claiming that he had been in possession of the victim's severed head, though Lucas had a reputation for false confessions.

== Early life ==
Ottis Toole was born and raised in Jacksonville, Florida. Toole's father was an alcoholic who abandoned him, while his abusive mother would dress him in girls' clothing and call him Susan. He was sexually abused as a child by many close relatives and acquaintances, including his older sister and a next-door neighbor. He also claimed to have been physically beaten by his brothers. He stated that his maternal grandmother was a Satanist who exposed him to various Satanic practices and rituals in his youth, including graverobbing. Toole claimed this abuse began when he revealed his homosexuality to his family.

Toole was often classified as having a mild intellectual disability, with an intelligence quotient (IQ) of 75. He also had epilepsy, which resulted in frequent grand mal seizures. Throughout Toole's childhood, he frequently ran away from home and often slept in abandoned houses. He was a serial arsonist from a young age and was sexually aroused by fire.

In the documentary Death Diploma, Toole stated that he was forced to have sex with a friend of his father's when he was five years old. He felt he knew that he was gay when he was 10 years old and that he had a sexual relationship with a neighborhood boy when he was 12. Toole dropped out of school in the ninth grade and began visiting gay bars. He also stated he had been a prostitute as a teenager and that he became obsessed with gay pornography at some point.

Toole stated that he committed his first murder at the age of 14, after being propositioned for sex by a traveling salesman. Toole ran over the salesman with his own car. Toole was first arrested at the age of 17 in August 1965 for loitering.

Much of the information about Toole's activities between 1966 and 1973 is unclear, but authorities believe that he began drifting around the Southwestern United States and that he supported himself by prostitution and panhandling. While living in Nebraska, Toole was one of the prime suspects in the 1974 murder of 24-year-old Patricia Webb. Shortly after, he left Nebraska and briefly settled in Boulder, Colorado. One month later, he became a prime suspect in the homicide of 31-year-old Ellen Holman, who was murdered on October 14, 1974. With many accusations being made against him, Toole left Boulder and headed back to Jacksonville.

In early 1975, Toole returned to Jacksonville after drifting and hitchhiking through the American South. On January 14, 1976, he married a woman 25 years his senior. She left him three days later, after discovering his homosexuality. Toole later said during an interview that his marriage was a tactic meant to conceal his true sexuality.

== Murders and imprisonment ==
Lucas (left) and Toole together

In 1976, Toole met Henry Lee Lucas at a Jacksonville soup kitchen, and they likely developed a sexual relationship. Toole later claimed to have accompanied Lucas in 108 murders, sometimes committed at the behest of a cult called "The Hands of Death". Police, however, discounted the uncorroborated claims about the cult's existence.

On January 4, 1982, Toole barricaded 65-year-old George Sonnenberg in a boarding house where he was living in Jacksonville and set the house on fire. Sonnenberg died a week later of injuries he sustained in the fire. In April 1983, Toole was arrested for an unrelated arson incident in Jacksonville. Toole confessed to the crime and was sentenced to 20 years in prison. Toole signed a confession stating that he and Sonnenberg had begun a sexual relationship and, after the two had an argument, Toole set Sonnenberg's home on fire.

Two months later, in June, Lucas was arrested for unlawful possession of a firearm. It was then that Lucas began boasting about the murderous rampage orchestrated by the two. At first, Toole had denied involvement but later began backing up Lucas's confessions. Lucas also backed Toole's confession to the murder of Adam Walsh. Journalist Hugh Aynesworth and others investigated for articles that appeared in The Dallas Times Herald. It was calculated that Lucas would have had to use his 13-year-old Ford station wagon to cover 11,000 miles (18,000 kilometers) in one month, i.e., around 370 miles (600 km) per day, to have committed the crimes police attributed to him. Lucas became widely regarded as a compliant interviewee who was used by police to clear up unsolved murders that he had not been involved in, aided by Toole giving false statements in collaboration.

During Toole's trial for murdering George Sonnenberg, Toole claimed that he did not light the home on fire and only signed the confession so he would be extradited back to Jacksonville. On April 28, 1984, a jury found Toole guilty of first degree murder and sentenced him to death. Later that year, Toole was found guilty of the February 1983 strangulation murder of a 19-year-old Tallahassee, Florida woman, and received a second death sentence; on appeal, however, both sentences were later commuted to life in prison.

After his incarceration, Toole pleaded guilty to four more Jacksonville murders in 1991 and received four more life sentences. The murders of which Toole was ultimately convicted were those of John McDaniel, Jerilyn Peoples, Brenda Burton, Ruby McCary, George Sonnenberg and Ada Johnson, all of whom were killed in Florida between 1980 and 1983.

=== Murder of Adam Walsh ===
On October 21, 1983, while he was imprisoned for two unrelated murders, Toole confessed to the 1981 murder of six-year-old Adam Walsh. A few weeks after Toole made the confession, however, police officers who were investigating the case announced that they had lost Toole's impounded car and machete. John Walsh, Adam's father, continues to believe that Toole was guilty. On December 16, 2008, 27 years after the 1981 murder, Hollywood, Florida, police announced Toole as the murderer, and the Adam Walsh case was closed. The police did not reveal any new physical evidence and pointed out that they still had no DNA evidence.

Toole claimed that he picked Walsh up in a Sears mall parking lot. Toole stated that Walsh came willingly because he offered Walsh candy and toys. Walsh soon wanted to go home and began to cry. Toole said that he then punched Walsh in the face. Walsh started to cry again, and according to Toole, he began to "wallop" Walsh, knocking him out. Toole eventually pulled over in a rural area and decapitated Walsh with a machete. He drove around with Walsh's head for several days, forgot about it, and, after he rediscovered it, he tossed it into a nearby canal. Police officers inexplicably lost Toole's impounded car and its bloodstained carpeting, hindering their ability to proceed with the investigation into Adam Walsh's murder.

=== Other confessions ===
In 1984, Toole confessed to two unsolved northwest Florida slayings, including one of the I-10 murders. During an interview, he admitted to killing 18-year-old David Schallart, a hitchhiker who he picked up east of Pensacola. Schallart's body, bearing five gunshot wounds in the left side of the head, was found on February 6, 1980, approximately 125 feet (38 meters) off I-10's eastbound lane, five miles (8.0 km) east of Chipley. The second confession involved the death of 20-year-old Ada Johnson. Toole confessed that he shot her in the head on a road outside of Fort Walton Beach after kidnapping her at gunpoint at a Tallahassee nightclub. Psychiatrists Dr. Urbina and Dr. Sanches testified at Toole's 1984 Florida Supreme Court appeal that he was extremely impulsive and exhibited antisocial behavior as a result of a personality disorder and that he was a pyromaniac. The court found sufficient evidence that Toole could be diagnosed with antisocial personality disorder.

Hollywood, Florida Police Chief Chadwick Wagner said that Toole had been the prime suspect all along, but he went on to admit that although Toole's case was weak, he could have been charged during the original investigation of it. Wagner acknowledged the fact that many mistakes were made by the department and apologized to the Walsh family on its behalf. Wagner also acknowledged the fact that the lack of new evidence and the inability of Toole to defend himself could provide room for skeptics to doubt Toole's guilt, saying, "If you're looking for that magic wand, that one piece of evidence, it's not there." However, after the police reexamined previously uncorrelated evidence, they and the Walsh family were both satisfied with the new report and the existing evidence which only points to Ottis Toole.

== Death ==
Toole died of cirrhosis at the Florida State Prison on September 15, 1996, at the age of 49. His body went unclaimed, and he was buried in the Florida State Prison cemetery.

== See also ==
- List of serial killers in the United States
- List of serial killers by number of victims
