= Victims' Rights Amendment =

Proposed constitutional amendment

In the United States, the Victims' Rights Amendment is a provision which has been included in some states' constitutions, proposed for other states, and additionally has been proposed for inclusion in the United States Constitution. Its provisions vary from state to state but are usually somewhat similar. There are likewise competing versions of the proposed federal amendment.

== The Victims' Rights Movement ==
The Victims' Rights Movement began as a response to the spread of two beliefs. The first was the perception that the legal system was more concerned with the protection of the constitutional rights of criminal offenders and alleged offenders than they were the victims of their offenses. This was especially inflamed by numerous lawsuits alleging unconstitutional conditions in many U.S. jails and prisons, and a strong emphasis on the education and rehabilitation of those who were incarcerated, especially beginning in the late 1960s and 1970s. Advocates of the movement wanted to see affirmative help for crime victims to be at least as extensive as that provided to the offenders, and for victims to receive compensation from offenders whenever this was practicable. The second stimulus was the spread of the belief, bolstered by prominent stories in the media, that the number of released or paroled offenders returning to attack their original victims or victims' families was increasing, in some cases in retaliation for having reported the original offense.

Most states' victims' rights amendments provide for the prosecutors to stay in touch with the victims and their families during all stages of prosecution, and to stay in touch with them post-conviction to advise them of events such as parole hearings, applications for pardons or other forms of executive clemency or relief, and similar news. They may require that any pay received by an offender while incarcerated go at least in part to compensate the victims, and that royalties to any creative works such as books, screenplays or similar works created by the offender judged to be derived from the events of the offense be assigned to the victims (though these latter requirements have been challenged as a violation of the constitutional guarantee of free speech).

== The Federal Amendment ==
The federal victims' rights amendments which have been proposed are similar to the above. The primary contention, and perhaps the main reason that to this point they remain only proposals, is whether they will apply only to federal offenses and the federal system or will mandate all states to adopt similar provisions (the version advocated by at least one very high-profile advocate, John Walsh, host of America's Most Wanted). This second version is offensive to many otherwise conservative "law and order" members of United States Congress because they deem it to be violative of another principle important to conservatives, that of federalism. Advocates of both sides are adamant on their version, and for this reason neither has been passed by either house of Congress as of 2019.

== Text of the Victims' Rights Amendment ==
House Joint Resolution 106, introduced on March 26, 2012, by Reps. Trent Franks (R-AZ 02) and Jim Costa (D-CA 20), failed to pass committee or be voted on. The bill reads as follows:

Section 1. The rights of a crime victim to fairness, respect, and dignity, being capable of protection without denying the constitutional rights of the accused, shall not be denied or abridged by the United States or any State. The crime victim shall, moreover, have the rights to reasonable notice of, and shall not be excluded from, public proceedings relating to the offense, to be heard at any release, plea, sentencing, or other such proceeding involving any right established by this article, to proceedings free from unreasonable delay, to reasonable notice of the release or escape of the accused, to due consideration of the crime victim's safety, and to restitution. The crime victim or the crime victim's lawful representative has standing to fully assert and enforce these rights in any court. Nothing in this article provides grounds for a new trial or any claim for damages and no person accused of the conduct described in section 2 of this article may obtain any form of relief.

Section 2. For purposes of this article, a crime victim includes any person against whom the criminal offense is committed or who is directly harmed by the commission of an act, which, if committed by a competent adult, would constitute a crime.

Section 3. This article shall be inoperative unless it has been ratified as an amendment to the Constitution by the legislatures of three-fourths of the several States within 14 years after the date of its submission to the States by the Congress. This article shall take effect on the 180th day after the date of its ratification.''

There have been several previous versions of the Victims' Rights Amendment. The text of one version reads as follows:

Section 1. Victims of crimes of violence and other crimes that Congress and the States may define by law pursuant to section 3, shall have the rights to notice of and not to be excluded from all public proceedings relating to the crime; to be heard if present and to submit a statement at a public pre-trial or trial proceeding to determine a release from custody, an acceptance of a negotiated plea, or a sentence; to these rights at a parole proceeding to the extent they are afforded to the convicted offender; to notice of a release pursuant to a public or parole proceeding or an escape; to a final disposition free from unreasonable delay; to an order of restitution from the convicted offender; to have the safety of the victim considered in determining a release from custody; and to notice of the rights established by this article.

Section 2. The victim shall have standing to assert the rights established by this article; however, nothing in this article shall provide grounds for the victim to challenge a charging decision or a conviction, obtain a stay of trial, or compel a new trial; nor shall anything in this article give rise to a claim for damages against the United States, a State, a political subdivision, or a public official; nor shall anything in this article provide grounds for the accused or convicted offender to obtain any form of relief.

Section 3. The Congress and the States shall have the power to enforce this article within their respective federal and state jurisdictions by appropriate legislation, including the power to enact exceptions when required for compelling reasons of public safety.

Section 4. The rights established by this article shall be applicable to all proceedings occurring after ratification of this article.

Section 5. The rights established by this article shall apply in all federal, state, military, and juvenile justice proceedings, and shall also apply to victims in the District of Columbia, and any commonwealth, territory, or possession of the United States.
