= Code Adam =

Missing-child safety program

Code Adam logo

Code Adam is a missing-child safety program in the United States and Canada, originally created by Walmart retail stores in 1994. This type of alert is generally regarded as having been named in memory of Adam Walsh, the 6-year-old son of John Walsh (the host of Fox's America's Most Wanted).

Adam was abducted from a Sears department store in Hollywood, Florida in 1981. A search was undertaken by Adam's mother, grandmother, and store employees, and public address calls were made for him every 10 to 15 minutes. After approximately 90 minutes of fruitless searching, local law enforcement was called. Sixteen days later, Adam's severed head was found; his body was never recovered.

Today, many department stores, retail shops, shopping malls, supermarkets, amusement parks, hospitals, and museums participate in the Code Adam program. Legislation enacted by Congress in 2003 now mandates that all federal office buildings and base or post exchanges (BX or PX) on military bases adopt the program. Walmart, along with the National Center for Missing & Exploited Children (NCMEC) and the departments of several state Attorneys General, have offered to assist in training workshops in order for other companies to implement the program.

== Process ==
Companies that do implement the program generally place a Code Adam decal at the front of the business. Employees at these businesses are trained to take the following steps, according to the National Center for Missing & Exploited Children:

1. If a visitor reports a child is missing, a detailed description of the child is obtained, which should include their name, age, hair color, eye color, approximate height and weight, clothing, and a photo if the visitor has one. Care is paid to the shoes, as they are harder to change than clothing.
2. The employee goes to the nearest in-house telephone and pages Code Adam, describing the child's physical features and clothing. The visitor will be directed to the entrance to help identify the child. Following the business's Code Adam plan, some employees will monitor entrances and note down potentially useful information, while others search the business in sections. All employees will ask children for their names, and if the adult accompanying them is their parent. If an adult is seen attempting to leave with a child, employees must not physically intervene, to prevent putting the child or others at risk of immediate harm.
3. Other than cashiers, all employees search likely hiding places for the missing child.
4. The police are immediately called.
5. If the child is located and appears to be lost or unharmed, their identity is verified.
6. If the child is located with an adult that is not their parent or guardian, reasonable efforts will be employed to delay the departure of the adult without endangering staff or customer.
7. After the child is either positively identified and reunited with their guardian or all collected information has been turned over to the police, an employee will page store-wide again to cancel the Code Adam.

== See also ==
- Adam Walsh Child Protection and Safety Act
- Amber alert
- Hospital emergency codes
- Lockdown
