= Stranger Danger: Family Values, Childhood, and the American Carceral State =

2020 book

- Author: Paul M. Renfro
- Language: English
- Subject: 20th century American history, stranger danger
- Publisher: Oxford University Press
- Publication date: 2020
- Pages: 312 pp
- ISBN: 0190914017

Stranger Danger: Family Values, Childhood, and the American Carceral State is a 2020 history book by American historian Paul M. Renfro. The book investigates the development of the "interlocking myths of stranger danger" in the 1970s and 1980s and their effects on American law and culture, including their influence over family values and social attitudes toward LGBT people.
