= Anderson Erickson Dairy =

Dairy in Iowa

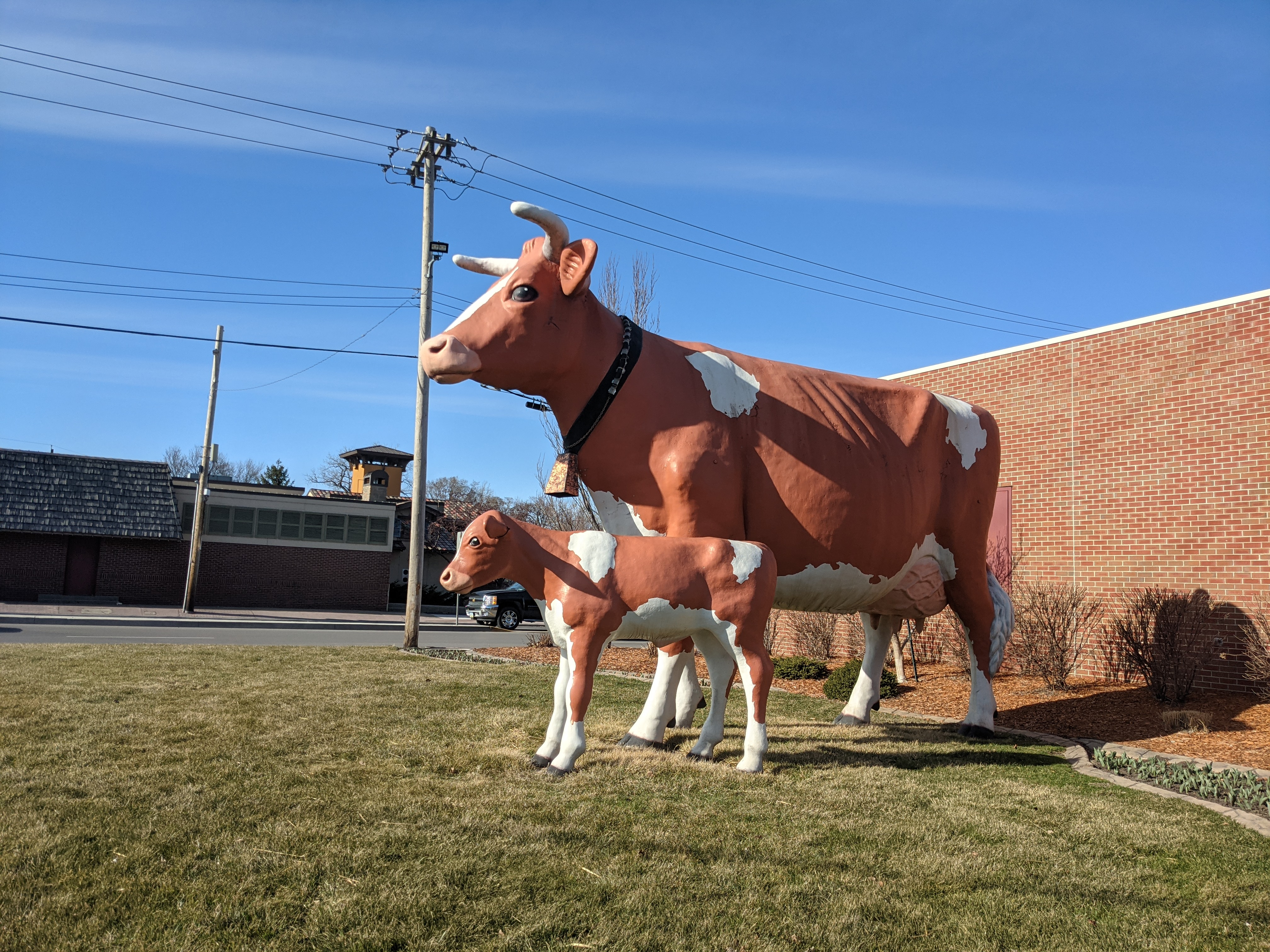
- Annie the cow and Eric her calf, two fiberglass cow sculptures outside of the AE dairy in east Des Moines, Iowa
- Type: Private
- Industry: Dairy
- Founded: 1930
- Founder: Iver Erickson, Bill Anderson
- Headquarters: Des Moines, Iowa, United States
- Key people: Miriam Erickson Brown (CEO), James W. Erickson (chairman)
- Products: Milk, Yogurt, Cottage Cheese, Sour Cream, Dips, Egg Nog, Ice Cream Mix, Orange Juice, Lemonade
- Revenue: $117.1 million
- Number of employees: 520
- Website: www.aedairy.com

The Anderson Erickson Dairy (AE) is the largest independently owned dairy in Iowa. Headquartered in Des Moines, it was founded in June 1930 during the Great Depression by Iver Erickson and Bill Anderson. After eight years in business, Anderson sold his interest in the company and moved to Minnesota, leaving Erickson with complete ownership of the company. By 2004 the family-owned company was the 73rd largest dairy by sales in the United States. As of 2025, it was still run by descendants of Iver Erickson.

Starting in 1930, AE offered early-morning home delivery of milk, in glass bottles. For the first two decades home deliveries were made seven days a week, because many customers did not own refrigerators. Empty bottles were picked up by the milkman, washed at the dairy and refilled for the next delivery. Additional dairy products were gradually added to the delivery service, and at the service's peak in the early 1950s, AE had about 150 delivery routes scattered around Iowa. Home delivery had dwindled to just two routes serving 350 customers by the end of the 20th century, and the service was ended in 2001.

The AE dairy was the first to print photographs of missing children on milk cartons. This began in September 1984, following the disappearance of two Iowa paperboys, Johnny Gosch and Eugene Martin. The practice of spreading information about missing children in this way would later be replicated across the nation.

In 2020, the AE dairy received a multimillion-dollar loan under the provisions of the CARES Act economic stimulus bill.

== Cow sculptures ==
A large pair of Guernsey cow sculptures is located outside of the corporate headquarters, at the intersection of East University Avenue and Hubbell Avenue. The 14-foot-tall cow, named Annie, weighs 2500 pounds, and her calf Eric weighs 200 pounds. Both are constructed from steel and fiberglass, and the pair are a landmark in east Des Moines. The cow statue has been in place since the 1960s, and the calf was added in the 1970s.
