= Murder of Adam Walsh =

1981 child murder in Hollywood, Florida, US

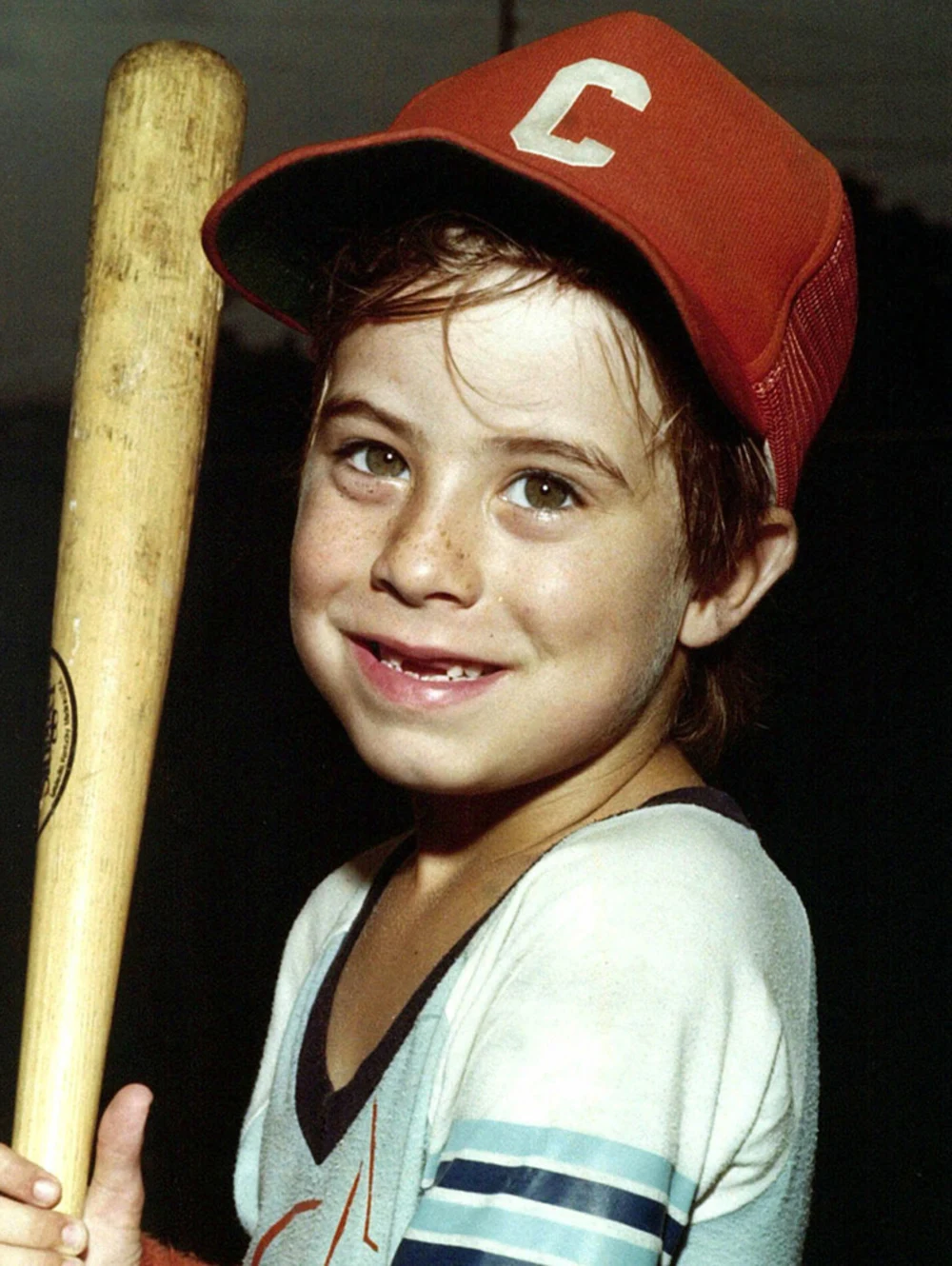
- Adam Walsh
- Location: Indian River County, Florida, U.S.
- Date: c. July 27, 1981; 45 years ago
- Attack type: Child murder by strangulation, beheading, child abduction, kidnapping
- Victim: Adam John Walsh
- Motive: Unknown
- Inquiry: Investigation concluded in December 2008
- Accused: Ottis Toole (confessed, later recanted confession; died 1996)

Adam John Walsh (November 14, 1974 – c. July 27, 1981) was an American child who was abducted from a Sears department store at the Hollywood Mall in Hollywood, Florida, on July 27, 1981. His severed head was found two weeks later in a drainage canal alongside Highway 60/Yeehaw Junction in rural Indian River County, Florida. Walsh's death garnered national interest and became the basis for the 1983 television film Adam, seen by 38 million people in its original airing.

Adam's father, John Walsh, became an advocate for victims of violent crimes and was the host of the television program America's Most Wanted. He has also hosted The Hunt with John Walsh and In Pursuit with John Walsh.

Convicted serial killer Ottis Toole confessed to Adam's murder, but was never convicted of the crime because evidence was reportedly lost and Toole later recanted his confession. Toole died in prison of liver failure on September 15, 1996. No new evidence has come to light since then, and police announced in December 2008 that the Walsh case was closed and that they were satisfied that Toole was the killer.

== Case history ==
=== Kidnapping and murder ===
On the afternoon of July 27, 1981, Adam accompanied his mother Revé Drew on a shopping trip to the Hollywood Mall (today Hollywood Hills Plaza) in Hollywood, Florida (26°00′46″N 80°10′30″W). They went to Sears, entering through the north entrance. Revé intended to inquire about a lamp that was on sale and left Adam at a kiosk with Atari 2600 video games on display, where several other boys were taking turns playing them. Revé completed her business in the lamp department around 12:15 p.m. She said that she returned to find that Adam and the other boys had disappeared. A store manager informed her that a scuffle had broken out over whose turn it was at the kiosk, and a security guard demanded that the boys leave the store. The security guard asked the older boys if their parents were in the store, and they said that they were not. Adam's parents later conjectured that their son had been too shy to speak to the security guard, who presumed that he was in the company of the other boys and made him leave by the same door by which the boys had entered (the Sears west entrance). His parents believe that after the other boys dispersed, he was left alone outside the store at an exit unfamiliar to him. Meanwhile, unable to find Adam in the toy department, Revé had him paged over the public address system and continued to look for him throughout the store. By coincidence, she ran into her mother-in-law Jean, who helped her search for him. After more than 90 minutes of searching and paging failed to locate Adam, Revé called the Hollywood Police at 1:55 p.m.

On August 10, a severed head was found in a drainage canal alongside the Florida Turnpike near Vero Beach, almost 130 miles (210 kilometres) from Hollywood, by detective Ralph E. Latimer Jr. and a deputy of the Indian River County sheriff's office. Indian River County and St. Lucie County divers searched the canal. The next morning, Revé and her husband, Adam's father, John Walsh, appeared on national television saying that they still hoped that Adam was alive. A US$100,000 (equivalent to $354,136 in 2025) reward was posted for Adam's safe return. Soon after, the recovered remains were identified as Adam's.

The coroner ruled that the cause of Adam's death was asphyxiation. The state of the remains suggested that Adam had died several days before the discovery of his head. The rest of his body was never recovered. The head itself was kept in the morgue until the case's closure in 2008.

=== Investigation ===
John and Revé believed that the Hollywood police department had botched the treatment of Adam's disappearance, first with the missing person investigation, and then with the murder investigation.

After some investigation, police eventually concluded that Adam was abducted by a drifter named Ottis Toole near the front exterior of Sears after being instructed to leave by a security guard. Toole said that he had lured Adam into his white 1971 Cadillac Sedan de Ville (which had a damaged right bumper) with promises of toys and candy, then proceeded to drive north on Interstate 95 toward his home in Jacksonville. According to Toole, Adam, at first docile and compliant, began to panic as they drove on. Toole punched him in the face, but as this just made the situation worse, he then "walloped him unconscious." While Adam was unconscious, Toole drove north on the Florida Turnpike to a deserted service road just north of the Radebaugh Road overpass along the St. Lucie County-Indian River County line. (27°33′35″N 80°39′47″W). When Toole realized that Adam was still breathing, he strangled him to death with a seat belt, dragged him out of the car and decapitated him with a machete. Toole also claimed to have incinerated the body in an old refrigerator when he returned to Jacksonville. He claimed that he wanted to make Adam his adopted son, but that was not deemed feasible. The source of the blood found in Toole's car could not be identified. The police ultimately lost the bloodstained carpet from the car, the machete said to have been used to decapitate Adam and, eventually, the car itself. Toole, a confidant of convicted serial killer Henry Lee Lucas, repeatedly confessed and then retracted accounts of his involvement.

Toole was never charged in Adam's case, although he provided seemingly accurate descriptions as to how he committed the crime. The 2019 Netflix miniseries The Confession Killer shows footage of Toole apparently being fed information from interrogators and he later confessed to several cases in which he had no involvement. Several witnesses also placed Toole in the Hollywood area in the days leading up to Adam's disappearance. In September 1996, Toole died in prison of cirrhosis at age 49 while serving a life sentence for other crimes. Later, his niece told John Walsh that he made a deathbed confession to Adam's murder. His confession was viewed as unreliable, as he and Lucas confessed to or implicated themselves in more than 200 homicides. Most of Lucas's confessions were later revealed to have been false, having been coerced by the Texas Rangers.

In 1997, Hollywood police chief Rick Stone conducted an exhaustive review of Adam's case after the release of John's book Tears of Rage. At the time, Stone was a 22-year veteran of the Dallas, Texas, and Wichita, Kansas, police departments and had been appointed Hollywood's chief of police in the previous year. Although the crime happened 16 years before the time of his review, he provided an analysis of the evidence, including a review of taped interrogations of Toole by Hollywood detective Mark Smith. Stone says that his review found evidence "beyond a reasonable doubt" that Toole murdered Adam. Stone noted that both Toole and Lucas were notorious for confessing to crimes that they had committed and then recanting.

In 2007, according to allegations that earned widespread publicity, Jeffrey Dahmer, who was arrested in Wisconsin in 1991 after killing more than a dozen men and boys, was also named as a suspect in Adam's murder. Dahmer's father called the America's Most Wanted hotline soon after his son's arrest to claim that he believed that his son was a pedophile. Dahmer was living in Miami Beach at the time of Walsh's murder, and two eyewitnesses placed him at the mall on the day that Adam was abducted. One claimed to have seen a strange man walking into the toy department. The other said that he saw a young, blond man with a protruding chin throw a struggling child into a blue van and speed off. Both witnesses recognized the man they had seen as Dahmer when pictures of him were released in the newspapers after his arrest. Reports revealed that the delivery shop where Dahmer worked had a blue van at the time. He preyed on young men and boys (the youngest being eight years older than Adam), and his modus operandi included severing his victims' heads. When he was interviewed about Adam Walsh in 1992, Dahmer repeatedly denied his involvement in the crime, even stating, "I've told you everything—how I killed them, how I cooked them, who I ate. Why wouldn't I tell you if I did it to someone else?" However, it has been reported that Dahmer believed he would be killed in prison as a pedophile if he confessed to Walsh's murder. After this rumor surfaced, John Walsh stated that he had "seen no evidence" linking Adam's abduction and murder to those that were committed by Dahmer.

On December 16, 2008, Hollywood police chief Chad Wagner, with Adam's parents present, made the announcement that the case was now closed. An external review of the case had been conducted and police announced that they were satisfied that Toole was the murderer.

== Legacy ==
=== Children found ===
The television film Adam premiered on October 10, 1983. The film was based on Walsh's kidnapping and murder, and it attracted 38 million viewers on its first airing. Each of its three broadcasts in 1983, 1984, and 1985 were followed by pictures and descriptions of missing children. A hotline was also created to take calls that may have materialized into leads for investigators. The pictures and hotline were credited with finding 13 of the 55 children shown. American rapper Bizzy Bone, who was abducted by his stepfather as a child, was reunited with his mother after a babysitter recognized a photo of him during the broadcast.

=== Laws and organizations for missing children ===
In 1984, the U.S. Congress passed the Missing Children's Assistance Act, owing in part to the advocacy of the Walshes and other parents of missing children. It allowed the formation of the National Center for Missing & Exploited Children (NCMEC).

The Code Adam program for helping lost children in department stores is named in Adam's memory. The U.S. Congress passed the Adam Walsh Child Protection and Safety Act on July 25, 2006, and President George W. Bush signed it into law on July 27. The signing ceremony took place on the South Lawn of the White House, attended by Adam's parents. The bill institutes a national database of convicted child molesters, and increases penalties for sexual and violent offenses against children. It also creates a RICO cause of action for child predators and those who conspire with them.

The Adam Walsh Reauthorization Act of 2016, which provides budgetary allotments to continue programs passed in the 2006 Act, was incorporated into H.R. 5578, the Survivors' Bill of Rights Act of 2016, and was enacted and signed by President Obama on October 7, 2016.

=== Societal effects ===
The publicity that surrounded Adam's case and the widely watched television movie Adam also created what was described as a mid-1980s missing children panic over stranger abductions. Richard Moran, a criminologist at Mount Holyoke College says: "[The case] created a nation of petrified kids and paranoid parents. Kids used to be able to go out and organize a stickball game, and now all playdates and the social lives of children are arranged and controlled by the parents...the fear still lingers today." Early estimates by the NCMEC would state that as many as 20,000 children a year were abducted by strangers, and public service spots relayed the perceived danger. A 1986 Pulitzer Prize exposé discussed a "numbers gap" between the claimed number and other statistics, such as that the FBI investigated a total of 67 abductions by total strangers in 1984. By 1988, even as the NCMEC lowered annual estimates of stranger abductions by 80%, "early estimates had a life of their own." A 1990 study of child abductions found that 99% of them were family-related. Between 2000 and 2015, the number of missing children ultimately killed decreased, partially attributed to the emergence of technologies such as mobile phones that allow calls for help.

== See also ==
- List of kidnappings
- List of solved missing person cases (1980s)
- Free-range parenting - A reaction to the paranoia of the missing children panic
