= Stranger danger =

Idea that all strangers could be dangerous

Stranger danger is a concept warning that all strangers can potentially be dangerous. The phrase originated in the 1960s and is intended to encapsulate the danger associated with adults whom children do not know. The phrase found widespread usage in the United States and United Kingdom in 1979 with high profile child abduction case Etan Patz, who was the first of many photos of missing children to appear on a milk carton. Many books, films, and public service announcements have been devoted to helping children remember this advice.

Although there are other dangers such as kidnapping for ransom, the main threat with which stranger danger campaigns are concerned is child sexual abuse. Portrayals in the news media have tended to reinforce public fears of strangers as potential pedophiles, despite sexual abuse of children being more likely to occur in families. In the early 2000s the emphasis of such campaigns shifted somewhat, to reflect the risk of abuse by persons known to the child.

== Proposition ==
Although there are other dangers such as kidnapping for ransom, the main threat with which stranger danger campaigns are concerned is sexual abuse. In the early 2000s, the emphasis of such campaigns shifted somewhat, to reflect the risk of abuse by persons known to the child. Common phrases children will hear include:

- Do not trust strangers.
- Do not talk to strangers.
- Do not walk with strangers.
- Do not go anywhere with strangers.
- Do not accept anything from strangers; this includes gifts, food, drinks and sweets.
- Do not talk to strangers even if they ask for directions, ask you to pet their dog or tell you a parent has been injured or in an accident.
- If a stranger approaches you, tell a trusted adult. There are other things you can do like ignoring them and consulting a trusted adult.
- Do not enter a stranger's vehicle or home.
- If a stranger approaches you near your school, return to your school immediately and tell a staff member or a family member.
- Do not communicate with strangers through text messages on cellular phones or e-mail on the computer. If strangers attempt to contact you through messages on cellular phones or e-mail on the computer, tell the police, a parent, or any other trusted adult.
- Your body is your private property. No one else has the right to touch it. (Exceptions include when the child requires hygiene assistance from trusted members of their family. Medical professionals, with parental approval, are allowed to touch the child's body for medical purposes.)

Some proponents of teaching stranger danger propose telling children that it is safe to talk to strangers in circumstances where the child is in danger, such as if the child is lost or injured. In such circumstances, avoiding potentially helpful strangers could, itself, be dangerous. Conversely, others propose teaching children never to approach others without parental permission. This admonishment extends to not entering a car, even if the child recognizes the driver.

== Child identification ==
In addition to stranger danger warnings, programs from the Federal Bureau of Investigation, local law enforcement agencies and other organizations offer free fingerprinting services usually done in schools, childcare centers, shopping malls, fairs, and festivals. Parents/guardians are provided with child identification sheets to use in cases of child abduction and other emergencies. Child identification sheets include the child's fingerprints, photo and other personal data. Neither the FBI nor any other law enforcement agency retains this information. DNA samples are also provided to parents.

== Legislation ==
In the wake of the July 2011 murder of Leiby Kletzky, New York City Councilman David Greenfield said he would propose "Leiby's Law", a bill under which businesses could volunteer to be designated as safe places for children who are lost or otherwise in trouble. Employees would undergo background checks and business owners would put a green sticker in their store windows so children would know the business is a safe place to get help. On August 16, 2011, the Brooklyn District Attorney's office announced a similar program called "Safe Stop". As of August 2011, 76 stores had signed up to display a green "Safe Haven" sticker in their windows to help lost children.

== Degree of risk ==
Media stories have often exaggerated the risk of "stranger danger" by emphasizing rare and isolated incidents. Especially regarding child sexual abuse, the greatest risk comes from members of the child's family. Nevertheless, "stranger danger" is more likely to be the focus of news headlines and education campaigns.

According to the U.S. Department of Justice, most missing children are runaways, and 99% of abducted children are taken by relatives, typically a noncustodial father. In response to these statistics, the National Center for Missing and Exploited Children has reversed their campaign focusing on "stranger danger".

Constantly warning children of possible danger in the form of strangers has also been criticised for unnecessarily spreading mistrust, especially when considering that (for example) in the US, about 800,000 children are reported at least temporarily missing every year, yet only 115 "become victims of what is viewed as classic stranger abductions". Only 10 percent of the child victimizers in violent crimes are strangers, and sex offenses are the crimes least likely to involve strangers as perpetrators.

A 2002 study looked at the nearly 800,000 minors who had been reported missing over a one-year period. Many were runaways. About 25 percent were family abductions, about 7 percent were nonfamily abductions, and only 115 – about 1 in 10,000 of all children reported missing – were "stereotypical kidnappings", defined in one study as "a nonfamily abduction perpetrated by a slight acquaintance or stranger in which a child is detained overnight, transported at least 50 miles, held for ransom or abducted with the intent to keep the child permanently, or killed". Journalist Stephen J. Dubner, co-author of Freakonomics, referred to this statistic as an example of his point that "most people are pretty terrible at risk assessment. They tend to overstate the risk of dramatic and unlikely events at the expense of more common and boring (if equally devastating) events."

In circumstances where the child is in danger for other reasons, avoiding strangers (who might help) could in fact be dangerous itself, such as in the case of an 11-year-old Boy Scout who avoided rescue searchers because he feared they may want to "steal" him.

According to the University of New Hampshire's Crimes Against Children Research Center, "stranger danger" disproportionately increases fear of strangers in comparison to fear of abusers known to the child. This is because humans have to operate on the basis of trust and reciprocity with acquaintances and it is difficult to view acquaintances as threatening or to fear them.

== Effects on children and families ==
The notion of "stranger danger" has been criticized for positioning children as passive objects of potential threat which allows adults to justify their means of controlling or isolating children. Gill Valentine argues that producing misleading or exaggerated messages about "stranger danger" results in the notion that public spaces are naturally adult spaces where children must be constantly protected, or where they do not belong at all.

Exaggerated fears of "stranger danger" have caused many parents to limit children's ability to be physically and socially active, such as by exploring their neighborhood unsupervised; for example, fewer parents allow children to walk to school alone than in the past. This increased tendency to keep children indoors has resulted in an alleged nature deficit disorder in children.

== In the United Kingdom ==
In the United Kingdom, stranger danger has long been a key theme in the safety of children. The potential danger of a child being abused or killed by a stranger has been seen as a major factor in children having less freedom from the mid 20th century onwards, although factors including other crimes as well as increased road traffic (increasing the risk of being run over) have also been deemed as factors in parents becoming more protective of their children in more recent years.

The conviction of Ian Brady and Myra Hindley of the Moors murders in 1966 was seen by many as the event which led to parents allowing their children less freedom, as well as making parents and children more alert of the fact that there are dangerous women as well as dangerous men. The brother of one of Brady and Hindley's victims recalled many years later that his murdered brother had been regularly warned not to accept sweets or lifts from strange men, but had never been told not to speak to or go anywhere with a strange woman, as few people at the time were aware that a strange woman could be potentially as dangerous as a strange man. Although child murders were already frequently reported in Britain before the Moors murders came to light, the fact that a woman was involved was a factor in the case becoming so high profile in the media and public eye, and remained so in the years ahead, despite the vast number of other high-profile murder cases which made the headlines. The first of Brady and Hindley's five known victims, Pauline Reade, was even a neighbour of Myra Hindley. The other four victims, however, were all unknown to Brady and Hindley.

In more recent years, "stranger danger" killings of children, including that of at least four young girls by Robert Black during the 1980s, and that of Sarah Payne in West Sussex in July 2000, may have led parents to become increasingly protective of their children, as well as prompting parents and teachers to make children more alert of the dangers of strangers. Black was a stranger who lured his victims from different parts of Britain while working as a lorry driver, while Sarah Payne's killer Roy Whiting was not known to the victim or to any of her family, who had confirmed this to the police when Sarah Payne was still missing and Whiting was first identified as a possible suspect. The murder of James Bulger in 1993 has also been cited as part of this phenomenon, although in that case the toddler involved was killed by a pair of older children rather than an adult. In the aftermath of Bulger's murder, in "a survey of parents by the children's organisation, Kidscape, 97% of respondents put abduction as their biggest worry, ahead of traffic accidents, glue-sniffing and AIDS."

However, statistics by government and police bodies have shown that "stranger danger" abductions of children are extremely rare, and murders in these circumstances rarer still, and that the overwhelming majority of cases of child abuse and murder were committed by someone who was known to the child.

The Soham murders in Cambridgeshire, where two 10-year-old girls were found dead two weeks after their disappearance in August 2002, are a notable example – the killer of the girls, Ian Huntley, was known to both of his victims, and his role as a local school caretaker portrayed him as a man with a position of trust who would not appear to be a likely danger to children whether known to them or not. The police had even mentioned to the media while the girls were still missing that they may have been abducted by someone who was known to them. Huntley was arrested some 12 hours before the bodies of the two girls were found, although until this development the disappearance of the girls might have been judged by the majority of the public and the media as a typical "stranger danger" abduction. Subsequent child murders, including those of Tia Sharp in South London and April Jones (whose body has never been found) in Mid Wales during 2012, were also proven to have been committed by a killer who was known to the victim – in the case of Tia Sharp, the murderer was a family member.

There have also been cases of murder where the victim was an older child or teenager whose greater freedom (compared to the average younger child) made it impossible for the police to determine whether the killer was definitely known to the victim. A notable example is Amanda Dowler, the Surrey teenager who disappeared in March 2002 and whose remains were found in Hampshire six months later. Levi Bellfield, already serving life imprisonment for two other murders, was found guilty of her murder nearly a decade later, and police said that she may have known Bellfield as he was the step-father of one of her friends at school. In 2005, 15-year-old Rochelle Holness was murdered and dismembered by her distant neighbour John McGrady on a high-rise council estate in South London, but as with the case of Amanda Dowler, police were unable to confirm whether Rochelle Holness knew her killer.

Such is the rarity of "stranger danger" abductions and killings of children in the United Kingdom that in May 2015, an online video portraying the dangers of strangers and potential abduction situations was in fact condemned by critics, due to these crimes being so rare. Indeed, the murder of Sarah Payne 15 years earlier may very well have been the most recent murder of a pre-teen child by a stranger in Britain.

== See also ==
- Alterity
- Anxiety
- Aporophobia
- Charley Says
- Evolutionary psychology
- Free-range parenting
- Online predator
- Opposition to immigration
- Stranger Danger: Family Values, Childhood, and the American Carceral State (2020 book)
- Xenophobia
