= NISMART =

NISMART or the National Incidence Studies of Missing, Abducted, Runaway and Throwaway Children, was a research project supported by the United States Department of Justice. It was enacted to address the 1984 Missing Children's Assistance Act (Pub.L. 98-473). This required the Office of Juvenile Justice and Delinquency Prevention (OJJDP) to conduct periodic national incidence studies to determine the actual number of children reported missing and the number recovered. The first study, NISMART-1 in 1988 categorized the various missing children reports and estimated the number of missing and recovered children in each. In 1999, a second study dubbed NISMART-2 was initiated.

A federal grant of $1 million for NISMART-3 was announced by the Office of Juvenile Justice and Delinquency Prevention in 2010.

== See also ==
- Child abduction
- Kidnapping
