= Hollywood Police Department (Florida) =

Law enforcement agency serving Hollywood, Florida

Coordinates: 26.0105°N 80.1748°W

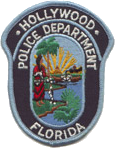
- Patch of the Hollywood Police Department
- Common name: Hollywood P.D.
- Abbreviation: HPD

Agency overview
- Formed: 1925

Jurisdictional structure
- Operations jurisdiction: Hollywood, Florida, United States

Operational structure
- Agency executives: Jeffrey Devlin, Chief of Police; Nicole Coffin, Assistant Chief of Police; Steven Bolger, Assistant Chief of Police; Paul Laskowski, Assistant Chief of Police

Website
- http://www.hollywoodpolice.org/

The Hollywood Police Department (HPD) is a full-service agency servicing a population of 160,511 in 27 square miles (70 km^{2}) of the municipality of Hollywood, Florida. At full strength, the department has 350 sworn law-enforcement officers.

== History ==
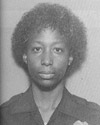
Frankie Mae Shivers, murdered in the line of duty in 1982

The police department was established on December 8, 1925, along with the town itself. The department had seven chiefs in its first year of existence as the city council appointed inexperienced locals with little interest in the work.

On September 17, 1926, a massive hurricane destroyed most of the town. The local National Guard unit protected the city as the department was devastated. Captain Clare Stout headed this operation and became chief of the department less than three years later.

The Great Depression hit the town hard. By 1931, policemen were forced to drive their own cars on patrol and pay in part for their uniforms. The next year, the city was unable to meet payroll and issued letters of credit in lieu of salaries.

The number of police officers on the force varied wildly during this period. The department was understaffed, underpaid and led by chiefs who lacked professional training. During this period, the city became a base for organized crime. Despite the legal prohibition of alcohol, many illegal bars and casinos operated undisturbed by the police. "Lucky" Luciano and Meyer Lansky ran their operations from Hollywood. These activities continued into the postwar era, despite periodic attempts by the state to suppress them. Between 1947 and 1951, United States senator Estes Kefauver and the Miami Herald highlighted local corruption and vice. This led to increased pressure that drove the biggest operations to Las Vegas and nearby Cuba.

In September 1980 an unknown number of police officers called in sick as a work action. The department's own website reports that in the 1980s many officers were more concerned with their side jobs as security guards than with their work with the department.

In January 1986, Richard Witt became chief of police. He had served 26 years with the Miami Police Department. He was the first chief of police with professional experience and few connections to the moneyed interests in the city.

Police Chief Rick Stone was brought in to try to reform the troubled and scandal-plagued department in 1996. He filed a RICO (Racketeer Influenced Corrupt Organization) lawsuit on April 13, 2000, against the Broward County Police Benevolent Association (a chapter of the statewide Florida Police Benevolent Association) and two union bosses, who were also members of the Hollywood Police Department.

In 2007, several Hollywood Police Department officers were implicated in a wide-reaching corruption investigation by the FBI, and a few officers turned state's evidence in order to reduce their potential sentences. Four officers were jailed for trafficking in heroin.

In 2009, five Hollywood Police Department officers were accused of trying to cover up a crash involving one of their own officers by lying on police reports. Officer Dewey Pressley is clearly heard on video to "draw little Disney here.." the report and as saying, "if I have to bend the rules to protect a cop I'm gonna." The audio from the incident was recorded by dashboard camera, and was reportedly full of vulgar language. On January 7, 2010, Police Chief Chad Wagner fired five officers involved in the incident. The officers were by that point in their sixth month of paid leave. On April 10, 2012, Officer Joel Francisco was sentenced to ninety days in jail after he pleaded guilty in the original accident. He had been talking on his phone when he hit the other car with his official vehicle. His record shows eight traffic accidents in his twelve years with the department. One other former Hollywood officer, Dewey Pressley, is appealing a ninety-day sentence.

On December 28, 2010, Officer Jonathan Commella beat and tasered Arben Bajra while he was handcuffed. Bajra's skull was fractured in the attack and he suffered permanent impairment. Commella had mistaken Bajra for someone else. No charges were brought against either man. In November 2013, the department paid Bajra $195,000. Commella had by then moved on to be a deputy of the Broward County Sheriff.

In 2012, the department began to use computer software to call numbers on commercial signs left on roadsides in the city. It reported as much as an eighty percent decrease in these small "snipe signs" in the city limits.

In March 2015, the city paid $240,000 to settle a police brutality lawsuit. The suit alleged that five police officers beat up a man and planted drugs on him. At the man's criminal trial, the officers testified he had ground his own face into the pavement. The case was dismissed. At about the same time, the department lost its state accreditation.

According to a 2017 report by the county inspector general, "The lack of oversight and accountability facilitated the theft of $137,609 and 1,096 pills from the Hollywood Police Department's custody prior to January 2012," but nobody was held criminally liable as a result.

Local news reported in February 2023 that footage from a surveillance camera that had been recently released shows Hollywood Police officers dragging a 69-year-old man they had shot into the victim's condominium's building's elevator. Reporter Rosh Lowe wrote that the police was actively investigating the case.

=== Innovations ===
The department has been credited for a number of innovative improvements in law enforcement efficiency and professionalism. For example, the Hollywood PD was one of the first departments in the state of Florida to mandate college degrees as a prerequisite for promotion to higher ranks, resulting in a number of command personnel receiving graduate and law degrees. It established a formalized field training officer program to properly orient new police officers. It was also among the first to incorporate Community Service Officers to handle routine calls for service including the investigation of traffic accidents not involving criminal conduct thereby freeing up sworn officers to handle more important criminal calls. It was also one of the first departments in Florida to adopt a full set of written policies and procedures, including a detailed use of force policy. It took advantage of advances in technology by acquiring a sophisticated computerized records system that incorporated a dial-in telephone system of recording police reports for transcription by high speed typists as well as an 800-megahertz trunked radio system with mobile data terminals. The computerized records system also provided for standardized computerized probable cause affidavits that greatly improved the accuracy and legal merit of arrests by ensuring that all required elements of any charged crime were included in the arrest affidavit. It was also one of the first departments to acquire a FATS machine to train officers in shoot/don't shoot scenarios. One of the highlights of this reputation for a high degree of professionalism and technical competence was that over ten ranking members of the department went on to become the chief of police at other law enforcement agencies, in some cases winning their jobs over well over one hundred other potential candidates for those jobs.

== Chiefs of police ==
Name	Date Appointed	Notes
Virgil Wright	December 8, 1925	Resigned the next day
George Bausweine	January 15, 1926	
Larry Walsh	March 31, 1926	Interim
CC Freeman	July 5, 1926	
"Big Bill" Adams	October 5, 1926	
Joe Valley	June 12, 1926	The town's first detective
Clare Stout	March 22, 1929	
Arthur M. Wittkamp	October 6, 1930	Fired
James Camphart	August 1, 1936	
EW Christian	September 2, 1940	
James Camphart	November 16, 1941	reappointed
James Lane	September 28, 1943	Acting
Philip A Thompson	February 4, 1947	Died in office
Woody Malphurs	December 28, 1965	
"Bud" Naylon	November 1, 1970	
Sam Martin	June 28, 1974	
Dick Witt	January 16, 1986	
Rick Stone	October 1, 1996	
Jim Scarberry	January 26, 1999	During this period, the department was under FBI investigation.
Chadwick Wagner	November 3, 2007	
Vincent Affanato		Interim Chief
Frank G. Fernandez	August 13, 2013	Resigned to take position for the City of Coral Gables
Tomas Sanchez	July 10, 2015	
Chris O'Brien	February 26, 2018	
Jeffery Devlin	January, 2024	

== Organization ==
The police headquarters is located at 401 S. Park Road in Hollywood. The headquarters officially opened at this location on Thursday, August 27, 2026.

The department is divided into two bureaus:

- Investigations and Support Services Bureau, run by the Assistant Chief includes:
  - Criminal Investigations Division
  - Support Services Division
  - Professional Standards Division
- Patrol Services Bureau, includes:
  - Patrol Division
  - Special Operations Division
  - Neighborhood Services Division

== Fallen officers ==
- Officer Owen Coleman, January 25, 1926
- Officer Henry T. Minard, November 18, 1972
- Officer Byron W. Riley, August 30, 1973
- Officer Phillip C. Yourman, August 30, 1973
- Officer Frankie M. Shivers, September 6, 1982
- Officer Alex Del Rio, November 22, 2008
- Officer Yandy Chirino, October 18, 2021
