= Black and Missing Foundation =

Non-profit organization for assisting families of missing people of color

The Black and Missing Foundation, Inc. (BAMFI) is a non-profit that addresses the disparity in media coverage and law enforcement response to missing persons of color in the United States. BAMFI's mission includes raising awareness through social media, community events, and media collaborations, and advocating for systemic change. The foundation highlights the disproportionate number of missing persons of color and the lack of media attention due to systemic racism and stereotypes. It was founded in 2008 by Derrica Wilson, a former law enforcement officer, and Natalie Wilson, a public relations specialist. Notable collaborations include features on HBOs "Black and Missing" and segments with "Access Hollywood".
