= Hollywood, Florida =

City in Florida, United States

- City
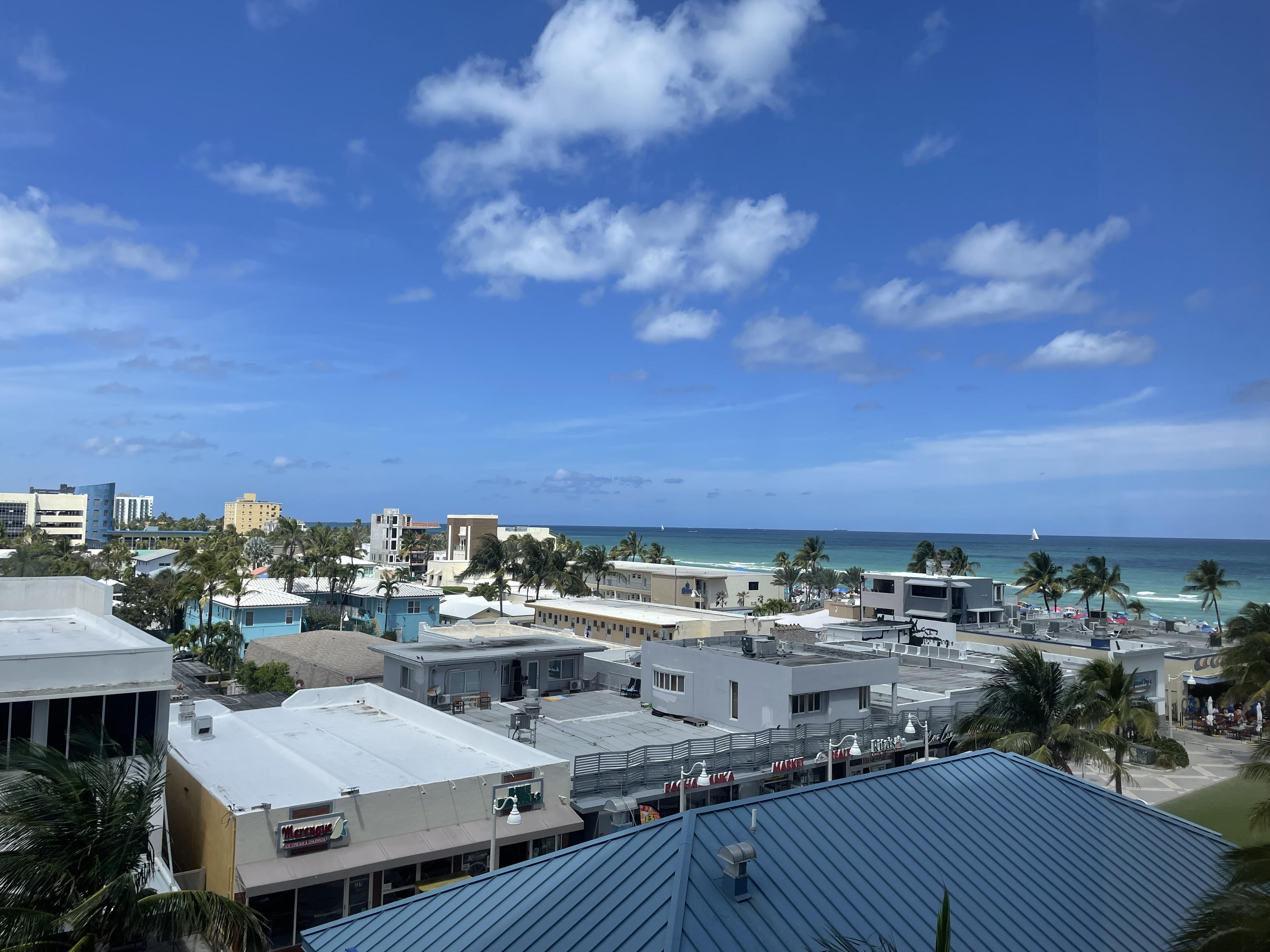
- Skyline

- Flag Seal
- Nickname: Diamond of the Gold Coast
- Location of Hollywood in Florida
- Coordinates: 26°01′49″N 80°09′23″W
- Country: United States
- State: Florida
- County: Broward
- Founded: February 18, 1921
- Incorporated: November 28, 1925
- Named for: Hollywood, Los Angeles

Government
  - Type: Commission-manager
  - Mayor: Josh Levy

Area
  - Total: 30.78 sq mi (79.71 km^{2})
  - Land: 27.25 sq mi (70.58 km^{2})
  - Water: 3.53 sq mi (9.13 km^{2}) 11.23%
- Elevation: 13 ft (4.0 m)

Population (2020)
  - Total: 153,067
  - Estimate (2022): 152,650
  - Rank: 176th in the United States; 12th in Florida
  - Density: 5,601.6/sq mi (2,162.79/km^{2})
- Time zone: UTC−5 (EST)
  - Summer (DST): UTC−4 (EDT)
- ZIP codes: 33004, 33009, 33019-33021, 33023, 33024, 33312, 33314, 33316
- Area codes: 954, 754
- FIPS code: 12-32000
- GNIS feature ID: 2404719
- Website: hollywoodfl.org

Hollywood is a city in Broward County, Florida, United States. It is a suburb in the Miami metropolitan area. The population of Hollywood was 153,067 as of 2020, making it the third-largest city in Broward County.

== History ==
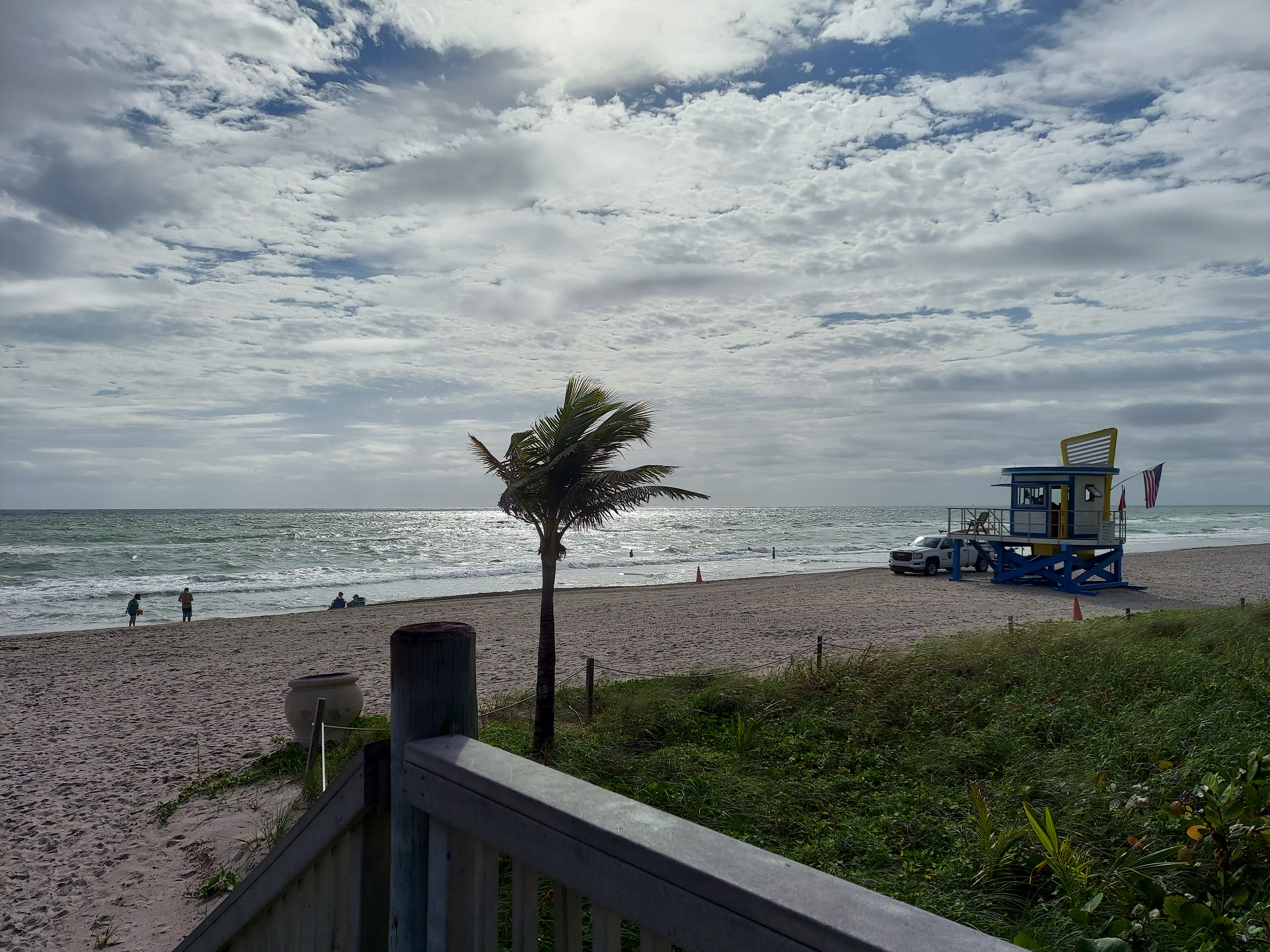
Hollywood Beach during the COVID-19 pandemic in late October 2020,

In 1920, Joseph Young was elected the first mayor in 1925. The town quickly became home to northerners known as "snowbirds", who fled south during the winter and returned north during the summer. By 1960, Hollywood had more than 2,400 hotel units and 12,170 single-family homes.

The Florida guide, published by the Federal Writers' Project, describes the development of Hollywood, an early example of the planned communities that proliferated in Florida during the real-estate boom of the 1920s:

During the early days of development here, 1,500 trucks and tractors were engaged in clearing land and grading streets; two yacht basins, designed by General George Washington Goethals, chief engineer in the construction of the Panama Canal, were dredged and connected with the Intracoastal Waterway. A large power plant was installed, and when the city lights went on for the first time, ships at sea reported that Miami was on fire, and their radio alarms and the red glow in the sky brought people to the rescue from miles around.

Hollywood was severely damaged by the 1926 Miami hurricane; local newspapers reported that it was second only to Miami in losses from the storm.

Hurricane Irma hit Florida in 2017, causing damage and power outages in Hollywood. 12 residents of the Rehabilitation Center at Hollywood Hills died of heat exposure. Four nursing-home staff were charged with negligence and manslaughter. Charges were dropped against the 3 nurses and the nursing home chief was acquitted.

=== Timeline ===
- 1921 – Hollywood by the Sea platted on land of Joseph Wesley Young
- 1925
  - Hollywood incorporated
  - Hollywood Police Department established
  - Joseph Wesley Young House built
- 1926
  - September 18: 1926 Miami hurricane demolished city
- 1932 – Riverside Military Academy Hollywood campus established
- 1935 – Fiesta Tropicale began
- 1948 – Broward County International Airport opened
- 1957
  - Seminole Tribe of Florida gained official recognition by the federal government, with tribal headquarters located in Hollywood.
  - McArthur High School opened
- 1958 – Diplomat Hotel
- 1975 – Art and Culture Center of Hollywood opened
- 1981
  - July 27: Murder of Adam Walsh
  - "U.S. Supreme Court affirms Tribe's right to high-stakes bingo at Hollywood in Seminole Tribe of Florida vs. Butterworth"
- 1997 – New Times Broward-Palm Beach newspaper began publication
- 2004 – Seminole Hard Rock Hotel & Casino Hollywood in business
- 2010 – Population: 140,768
- 2019 – Seminole Hard Rock Hotel & Casino Hollywood guitar shaped hotel opened, with pool and manmade lake

== Geography ==
According to the United States Census Bureau, the city has an area of 30.8 square miles (80 km^{2}), of which 3.46 square miles (9 km^{2}) are covered by water (11.23%).

Hollywood is in southeastern Broward County, and includes about 5 to 6 miles (8.0 to 9.7 km) of Atlantic Ocean beach, interrupted briefly by a portion deeded to Dania Beach.

=== Climate ===
Hollywood has a tropical rainforest climate (Köppen climate classification Af), with long, hot, humid, and rainy summers and short, warm, and dry winters.

Climate data for Hollywood, Florida, 1991–2020 normals, extremes 2000–present
Month	Jan	Feb	Mar	Apr	May	Jun	Jul	Aug	Sep	Oct	Nov	Dec	Year
Record high °F (°C)	87 (31)	88 (31)	91 (33)	96 (36)	98 (37)	98 (37)	97 (36)	97 (36)	95 (35)	93 (34)	91 (33)	90 (32)	98 (37)
Mean maximum °F (°C)	84.7 (29.3)	85.7 (29.8)	87.7 (30.9)	89.2 (31.8)	90.5 (32.5)	92.1 (33.4)	93.4 (34.1)	93.3 (34.1)	92.4 (33.6)	91.1 (32.8)	87.1 (30.6)	86.0 (30.0)	94.7 (34.8)
Mean daily maximum °F (°C)	76.1 (24.5)	77.2 (25.1)	78.9 (26.1)	82.0 (27.8)	84.6 (29.2)	87.7 (30.9)	89.6 (32.0)	89.9 (32.2)	88.1 (31.2)	85.1 (29.5)	81.0 (27.2)	78.0 (25.6)	83.2 (28.4)
Daily mean °F (°C)	67.6 (19.8)	68.9 (20.5)	70.9 (21.6)	75.0 (23.9)	78.2 (25.7)	81.3 (27.4)	82.9 (28.3)	83.3 (28.5)	82.0 (27.8)	79.0 (26.1)	73.9 (23.3)	70.1 (21.2)	76.1 (24.5)
Mean daily minimum °F (°C)	59.2 (15.1)	60.5 (15.8)	63.0 (17.2)	67.9 (19.9)	71.7 (22.1)	74.8 (23.8)	76.2 (24.6)	76.7 (24.8)	75.8 (24.3)	72.8 (22.7)	66.7 (19.3)	62.2 (16.8)	69.0 (20.6)
Mean minimum °F (°C)	42.9 (6.1)	45.5 (7.5)	50.3 (10.2)	57.5 (14.2)	64.6 (18.1)	70.6 (21.4)	71.9 (22.2)	72.5 (22.5)	71.9 (22.2)	63.2 (17.3)	53.4 (11.9)	49.5 (9.7)	40.3 (4.6)
Record low °F (°C)	34 (1)	35 (2)	40 (4)	49 (9)	56 (13)	63 (17)	64 (18)	69 (21)	65 (18)	52 (11)	46 (8)	34 (1)	34 (1)
Average precipitation inches (mm)	2.82 (72)	2.75 (70)	3.41 (87)	3.35 (85)	6.60 (168)	8.84 (225)	6.74 (171)	7.46 (189)	8.67 (220)	8.22 (209)	3.72 (94)	2.46 (62)	65.04 (1,652)
Average precipitation days (≥ 0.01 in)	7.2	6.1	6.3	6.9	10.4	14.4	15.4	15.4	16.0	12.8	9.8	8.2	128.9
Source: NOAA (mean maxima/minima 2006–2020)

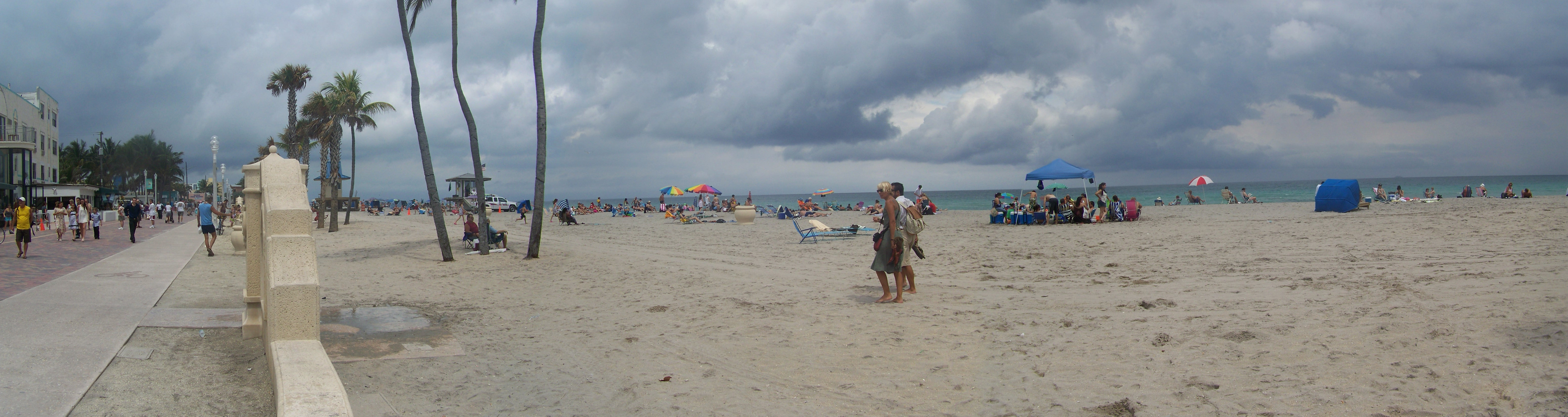
Hollywood Beach in March 2008

== Demographics ==
Historical population
Census	Pop.	Note	%±
1930	2,869		—
1940	6,239		117.5%
1950	14,351		130.0%
1960	35,237		145.5%
1970	106,873		203.3%
1980	121,323		13.5%
1990	121,697		0.3%
2000	139,357		14.5%
2010	140,768		1.0%
2020	153,067		8.7%
2022 (est.)	152,650	▼	−0.3%
U.S. Decennial Census; 1960–1970 1980 1990; 2000 2010 2020 2022

Historical racial composition	2020	2010	2000	1990	1980
White (non-Hispanic)	37.2%	47.5%	61.6%	78.5%	90.0%
Hispanic or Latino	39.9%	32.6%	22.5%	11.9%	5.3%
Black or African American (non-Hispanic)	16.5%	15.4%	11.5%	8.1%	4.0%
Asian and Pacific Islander (non-Hispanic)	2.6%	2.4%	2.0%	1.2%	0.8%
Native American (non-Hispanic)	0.2%	0.2%	0.2%	0.2%	0.8%
Some other race (non-Hispanic)	0.9%	0.4%	0.3%	0.1%	0.8%
Two or more races (non-Hispanic)	2.8%	1.5%	1.9%	N/A	N/A
Population	153,067	140,768	139,357	121,697	121,323

Demographic characteristics	2020	2010	2000	1990	1980
Households	72,585	71,070	68,426	52,904	50,764
Persons per household	2.11	1.98	2.04	2.30	2.39
Sex Ratio	94.9	96.1	94.1	90.0	87.8
Ages 0–17	19.1%	20.3%	21.3%	19.1%	19.8%
Ages 18–64	62.8%	64.6%	61.4%	57.8%	55.0%
Ages 65 +	18.1%	15.1%	17.3%	23.1%	25.1%
Median age	42.6	41.1	39.2	40.1	43.1
Population	153,067	140,768	139,357	121,697	121,323

Economic indicators
2017–21 American Community Survey	Hollywood	Broward County	Florida
Median income	$32,371	$36,222	$34,367
Median household income	$56,912	$64,522	$61,777
Poverty Rate	12.4%	12.4%	13.1%
High school diploma	88.2%	90.0%	89.0%
Bachelor's degree	29.9%	34.3%	31.5%
Advanced degree	12.2%	13.1%	11.7%

Language spoken at home (Note: Language spoken at home among residents at least five years old; only languages (or language groups) which at least 2% of residents have spoken at any time since 1980 are mentioned)	2015 (Note: Refers to 2013–2017 American Community Survey data; the last Decennial Census where language data was collected was in the 2000 census)	2010 (Note: Refers to 2008–2012 American Community Survey data; the last Decennial Census where language data was collected was in the 2000 census)	2000	1990	1980
English	52.5%	56.9%	66.5%	78.1%	85.1%
Spanish or Spanish Creole	33.9%	30.2%	21.5%	11.1%	4.7%
French or Haitian Creole	4.8%	4.5%	3.5%	2.7%	1.4%
Italian	N/A (Note: Not counted separately; aggregated into "Other" category)	0.6%	1.1%	1.9%	2.8%
Other Languages	8.8%	7.8%	7.4%	6.2%	6.0%

Nativity	2015 (Note: Refers to 2013–2017 American Community Survey data; the last Decennial Census where foreign-born population data was collected was in the 2000 census)	2010 (Note: Refers to 2008–2012 American Community Survey data; the last Decennial Census where foreign-born population data was collected was in the 2000 census)	2000	1990	1980
% population native-born	64.8%	66.8%	73.7%	82.2%	86.4%
... born in the United States	61.0%	63.2%	70.2%	79.5%	85.1%
... born in Puerto Rico or Island Areas	2.3%	2.4%	2.6%	1.8%	1.3%
... born to American parents abroad	1.4%	1.2%	1.0%	0.9%	1.3%
% population foreign-born (Note: Only countries of birth which at least 1.5% of residents were born in at any time since 1980 are mentioned)	35.2%	33.2%	26.3%	17.8%	13.6%
... born in Cuba	5.0%	3.8%	2.8%	2.1%	1.5%
... born in Colombia	3.6%	3.2%	2.8%	0.8%	N/A
... born in Haiti	2.5%	2.4%	1.1%	0.4%	N/A
... born in Jamaica	2.2%	2.3%	2.0%	0.8%	0.3%
... born in Peru	1.8%	2.0%	1.1%	0.4%	N/A
... born in the Dominican Republic	1.7%	1.4%	0.9%	0.4%	0.1%
... born in Canada	1.3%	1.2%	1.9%	1.9%	1.6%
... born in other countries	17.1%	16.9%	13.7%	11.0%	10.1%

As of 2000, Hollywood had the 75th-highest percentage of Cuban residents in the U.S., at 4.23% of its population, and the 65th-highest percentage of Colombian residents in the US, at 2.26% (tied with both the town and village of Mount Kisco, New York.) It also had the 57th-highest percentage of Peruvian residents in the US, at 1.05% (tied with Locust Valley, New York), and the 20th-highest percentage of Romanian residents in the US, at 1.1% (tied with several other areas).

== Economy ==
Before it dissolved, Commodore Cruise Line and its subsidiary Crown Cruise Line were headquartered in Hollywood.

Aerospace and electronics parts manufacturer HEICO is headquartered in Hollywood.

Since 1991, the Invicta Watch Group, a manufacturer and marketer of timepieces and writing instruments, has been headquartered in Hollywood, where it also operates its customer-service call center.

== Public facilities ==
Hollywood's public schools are operated by the Broward County Public Schools. The public high schools are Hollywood Hills High School, McArthur High School, South Broward High School, and Sheridan Technical College and High School.

There is a Hollywood Police Department.

== Notable people ==
- Davey Allison (1961–1993), racing driver
- Jayne Atkinson (born 1959), actress
- Herbert L. Becker (born 1951), magician
- Steve Blake (born 1980), basketball player
- Lauren Book (born 1984), politician
- Ethan Bortnick (born 2000), pianist
- Chris Britton (born 1982), baseball player
- Marquise Brown (born 1997), American football player
- Janice Dickinson (born 1955), model and television personality
- Joe DiMaggio (1914–1999), baseball player
- Mike Donald (born 1955), professional golfer
- Scotty Emerick (born 1973), singer-songwriter
- Seth Gabel (born 1980 or 1981), actor
- Josh Gad (born 1981), actor
- Matt Gaetz (born 1982), U.S. representative for Florida
- Adam Gaynor (born 1963), guitarist
- Alan Gelfand (born 1963), skateboarder, racing driver and entrepreneur
- Michael Heverly, model
- Rosemary Homeister Jr. (born 1972), jockey
- Erasmus James (born 1982), American football player
- Evan Jenne (born 1977), politician
- Victoria Justice (born 1993), actress, model and singer
- Abraham Katz (1926–2013), diplomat
- Joe Klink (born 1962), baseball player
- Veronica Lake (1922–1973), actress
- Bethany Joy Lenz (born 1981), actress and musician
- Ricardo López (1975–1996), stalker who attempted to murder Björk with a letter bomb
- Jeff Marx (born 1970), composer and lyricist
- Oddibe McDowell (born 1962), baseball player
- Bryant McFadden (born 1981), American football player
- Danny McManus (born 1965), American football player
- Fred Melamed (born 1956), actor
- Tracy Melchior (born 1973), actress
- Camila Mendes (born 1994), actress
- Billy Mitchell (born 1965), video game player
- Michael Mizrachi (born 1981), poker player
- Mike Napoli (born 1981), baseball player
- Nick Page (born 2002), American Olympic freestyle skier
- Norman Reedus (born 1969), actor and model
- Moshe Reuven, rapper and entrepreneur
- Ian Richards (born 1975), judge
- Patti Rizzo (born 1960), golfer
- Jon Pernell Roberts (1948–2011), drug trafficker
- Latrice Royale (born 1972), drag queen
- Jabaal Sheard (born 1989), American football player
- Joe Trohman (born 1984), musician
- John Walsh (born 1945), television producer
- Scott Weinger (born 1975), actor
- Robert Wexler (born 1961), politician
- Lorenzo White (born 1966), American football player

== In popular culture ==
The television game show Hollywood Squares taped a week of shows at the historic Diplomat Hotel in 1987 and featured aerial footage shot over Hollywood, Florida.

Episode 15 of season six of the HBO crime drama The Sopranos featured scenes shot in the vicinity of the Hollywood Beach Marriott along Carolina Street.

The comedy series Big Time in Hollywood, FL is set in Hollywood.

== Sister cities ==
Hollywood's sister cities are:

- Baia Mare, Romania
- Ciudad de la Costa, Uruguay
- Diego Bautista Urbaneja, Venezuela
- Guatemala City, Guatemala
- Herzliya, Israel
- Higüey, Dominican Republic
- Laayoune, Morocco
- Vlorë, Albania

== Bibliography ==
- Ory Mazar Nergal, ed. (1980). "Hollywood, FL". Encyclopedia of American Cities. New York: E.P. Dutton. OL 4120668M.
- C. Richard Roberts (2002). Hollywood. Images of America. Charleston, South Carolina: Arcadia. ISBN 978-0-7385-1482-6.
- Florida, DK Eyewitness Travel Guides, 2004, pg. 132
- Paul T. Hellmann (2006). "Florida: Hollywood". Historical Gazetteer of the United States. Taylor & Francis. ISBN 1-135-94859-3.
- Joan Mickelson (2013). Joseph W. Young, Jr., and the City Beautiful: A Biography of the Founder of Hollywood, Florida. McFarland. ISBN 978-0-7864-6880-5.
