= Nick Lampson =

American politician (born 1945)

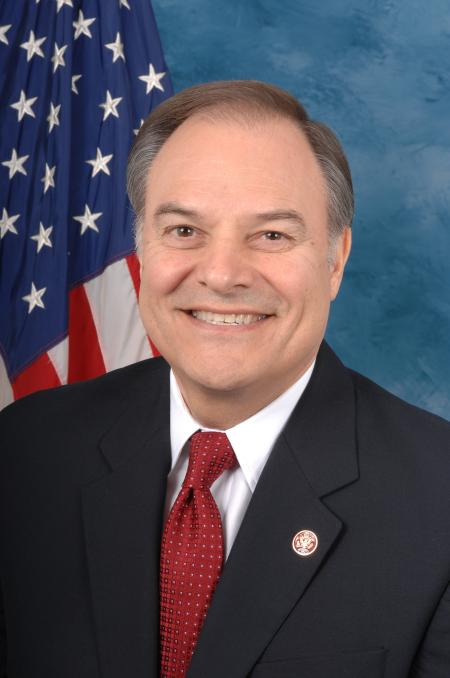

Member of the U.S. House of Representatives from Texas
- In office January 3, 2007 – January 3, 2009
- Preceded by: Shelley Sekula-Gibbs
- Succeeded by: Pete Olson
- Constituency: 22nd district
- In office January 3, 1997 – January 3, 2005
- Preceded by: Steve Stockman
- Succeeded by: Ted Poe (redistricted)
- Constituency: 9th district

Personal details
- Born: Nicholas Valentino Lampson; February 14, 1945 (age 81) Beaumont, Texas, U.S.
- Party: Democratic
- Spouse: Susan Floyd
- Children: 2
- Education: Lamar University (BS, MEd)

Nicholas Valentino Lampson (born February 14, 1945) is an American politician who represented Texas's 22nd congressional district from 2007 to 2009 and Texas's 9th congressional district before that from 1997 to 2005.

== Early life, education, and early political career ==
Lampson was born on February 14, 1945, in Beaumont, Texas, one of six children. His grandparents came to the United States from Italy and settled in Stafford, Texas, where they owned farms and were founding members of their church. His parents grew up, met, and married in Fort Bend County. Lampson's mother and father eventually moved to Beaumont, where he was born.

Lampson is one of six children born to a welder and a homemaker. His father died when he was 12 years old, and Lampson took his first job at that young age sweeping floors to supplement the family's income. Lampson's mother received $19 per month from Social Security as long as he stayed in school. This money helped his family stay together in those difficult years. This would later influence his commitment to protecting Social Security.

=== Education ===
Though Lampson's mother had only a fifth grade education, she encouraged her children in school, and all six graduated from college with at least one degree. His mother earned her GED on her 80th birthday. Lampson earned a Bachelor of Science degree in biology and a master's degree in education from Lamar University, where he was a member of the Pi Kappa Alpha fraternity. He taught high school science at Hebert High School in Beaumont. An inner calling to be of service to others, and the experience of interning with Congressman Jack Brooks in 1969, led him to seek public office.

=== Early political career ===
In 1976, Lampson was elected tax assessor-collector for Jefferson County and served nearly twenty years. He instituted an emphasis on customer service, successfully pushed for major upgrades in computer technology, and reduced the cost of collecting taxes by $3 million a year.

He resigned from his post in order to run for congress.

== First period in Congress (1997–2005) ==
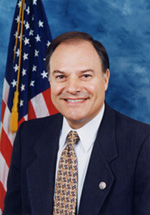
Lampson during the 108th Congress

=== Elections ===
1996

In the 1996 election, Lampson decided to run for a seat in the U.S. House of Representatives representing Texas's 9th congressional district. The incumbent was Republican U.S. Congressman Steve Stockman, who was a freshman in congress. The district had been represented by Democrat Jack Brooks for 42 years, but Brooks had been one of the most prominent Democratic incumbents to lose re-election in the "Republican Revolution" of 1994, which brought the House under the control of Republicans for the first time since the 83rd United States Congress following the 1952 elections. Lampson won the Democratic primary with 69% of the vote. In the general election, he defeated Stockman 53%-47%.

1998

He won re-election to a second term against Republican Tom Cottar 64%-36%.

2000

He won re-election to a third term against Republican Paul Williams 59%-40%.

2002

He won re-election to a fourth term against Republican Paul Williams 59%-40%.

2004

Lampson was one of the prime targets of a controversial mid-decade redistricting in 2003. His district was renumbered as the 2nd district. Galveston, which along with Beaumont had anchored the district and its previous incarnations for over a century, was moved into the neighboring 14th District. Much of Galveston County and the portion of Houston including NASA's Johnson Space Center (which had been part of the 9th since 1967) were drawn into DeLay's 22nd District. They were replaced by several heavily Republican areas north and east of Houston.

In the 2004 election, Lampson opted to run for reelection in the 2nd District. His Republican opponent was Ted Poe, a longtime district court judge in Harris County, home to most of Houston. Poe defeated Lampson, 56%-43%. Though Beaumont and Jefferson County gave Lampson a majority, he was swamped in the Harris County portion of the district, which supported Poe with 70% of the vote. He was one of several Democratic incumbents that were successfully removed from office as a direct result of Tom Delay's controversial mid-decade redistricting plan.

== Second period in Congress (2007–2009) ==
=== Elections ===
==== 2006 ====
On May 4, 2005, Lampson announced his candidacy in Texas's 22nd congressional district, which had been held by DeLay for 20 years. In the 2003 redistricting, DeLay drew much of Lampson's former territory into his own 22nd district, including part of Galveston County (but not Galveston city) and the Johnson Space Center. Lampson had briefly considered a so-called "kamikaze" run against DeLay. He moved to Stafford, a city halfway between Houston and Sugar Land, where his grandparents immigrated to from Italy.

Conservative media pundits criticized Lampson's decision to run in the 22nd. Fred Barnes of Fox News Channel called him "a carpetbagger" who "moved into" DeLay's district. However, Lampson had represented all of the 22nd's portion of Galveston County, as well as part of its share of Houston, during his first stint in Congress. Also, as mentioned above, he had family connections in the district.

The 22nd had long been considered a solidly Republican district, with a Cook Partisan Voting Index of R+15. A Democratic presidential candidate had not carried the district since the Texan Lyndon B. Johnson defeated Barry Goldwater in the 1964 election. Democrats had not held the congressional seat since after the 1978 election. The 2008 presidential candidate Ron Paul had held the seat as a Republican before DeLay took over in 1985. Historically, among districts in the Houston area, only the 7th District has been considered more Republican.

DeLay, who was then the House Majority Leader, was seen as vulnerable. He had only won re-election by 14 points in 2004 against a relatively unknown Democrat who spent virtually no money—an unusually close margin for a party leader. Many experts believed that as a result of DeLay's attempts to make the other Houston-area districts more Republican, his own district was more competitive than the one he had represented for his first 10 terms in Congress. Most importantly, DeLay had been investigated for corruption and was indicted on conspiracy and money laundering charges. DeLay denied all allegations and a Texas judge dismissed the former charge in late 2006; still, this damaged DeLay's credibility in the campaign.

On April 4, 2006, DeLay withdrew his candidacy for the upcoming November midterm elections in the face of questions about his ethics; he cited troubling poll numbers as the reason. Lampson announced on August 17, 2006, that three major police associations had endorsed him: the National Association of Police Organizations, the International Union of Police Associations, and the Texas State Police Coalition.

Texas Governor Rick Perry announced on August 29, 2006, that a special election would take place for the balance of DeLay's 11th term, coinciding with the general election on November 7, 2006. This meant that voters voted once in the special election for a candidate to fill DeLay's seat during the lame-duck session of the 109th Congress, and voted a second time for a candidate to represent the district in the 109th Congress. Lampson ran only for the full term, facing Republican Houston City Councilwoman Shelley Sekula-Gibbs.

On September 22, 2006, The Hotline ranked Texas' 22nd Congressional District House race as third (up from a previous ranking of fifth) in a list of the top 30 House races in the country. Additionally, other traditionally conservative organizations backed Lampson's candidacy. The National Rifle Association and the Veterans of Foreign Wars both supported Lampson in the 2006 election.

Three national political journals—the Cook Political Report, Larry Sabato's Crystal Ball, and Congressional Quarterly—rated the race as Leans Democratic. On October 30, 2006, a Zogby poll commissioned by the Houston Chronicle-KHOU-TV was released, showing the write-in candidate, Sekula-Gibbs, at 27.9 percent and Lampson at 36 percent, with nearly 25 percent still undecided.

Lampson defeated Sekula-Gibbs in the November 7 election, 52% to 42%, with the remaining 6 percent going to Libertarian Bob Smither. He officially returned to Congress on January 4, 2007. But, DeLay was still on the ballot as the official Republican candidate (Democrats successfully sued to prevent Sekula-Gibbs' from replacing DeLay on the ballot, forcing her to run a write-in campaign). Meanwhile, Sekula-Gibbs ran unopposed in the special election. This caused confusion for many voters, who were told repeatedly "write in Sekula-Gibbs" but then found her name on the ballot. This resulted in a large (but unreleased) number of excluded votes for Tom DeLay in the general election. Numerous ballots were discarded, including all straight-party votes and direct votes for DeLay. This caused a small outcry of resentment from supporters of Sekula-Gibbs, who felt the election was stolen and their votes disfranchised.

The two elections held on the same day resulted in Sekula-Gibbs winning to serve the last two months of DeLay's term, while Lampson won the seat for a full term, starting in January 2007.

==== 2008 ====
Lampson faced reelection in 2008 against Pete Olson, an attorney and a former aide to Senators Phil Gramm and John Cornyn. Despite the perception that the district was more competitive than the one DeLay represented for his first 10 terms, the 22nd was considered a heavily Republican district. It gave Bush 64 percent of the vote in 2004. By most accounts, it was one of the few realistic chances for a Republican challenger to unseat a Democrat in what was forecast to be a bleak year for Republicans.

Olson and Lampson agreed to a debate on the issues on October 20, 2008, in Rosenberg, Texas.

An October 22, 2008, poll by John Zogby and the Houston Chronicle said that Olson had a 17-point lead over Lampson.

On October 30, 2008, Larry Sabato predicted Lampson's Congressional race to be a "Republican Pick Up" with Olson defeating Lampson.

On November 4, 2008, Olson defeated Lampson with 52% of the vote to Lampson's 45%. Lampson carried the Galveston County portion of the district, but could not overcome a 15,900-vote deficit in Harris County.

== Committee assignments ==
- Committee on Agriculture
  - Subcommittee on Nutrition, Oversight, and Department Operations
  - Subcommittee on Livestock, Dairy, and Poultry
- Committee on Transportation and Infrastructure
  - Subcommittee on Aviation
  - Subcommittee on Highways and Transit
  - Subcommittee on Economic Development, Public Buildings and Emergency Management
  - Subcommittee on Railroads, Pipelines, and Hazardous Materials
  - Subcommittee on Water Resources and Environment
- Committee on Science, Space, and Technology
  - Subcommittee on Energy (chair)
  - Subcommittee on Space and Aeronautics (Ranking Member)

== Tenure ==
=== Missing and exploited children ===
In the spring of 1997, 12-year-old Laura Kate Smither of Friendswood, Texas, was abducted while she was out jogging. Despite efforts by the community and law enforcement her body was found two and a half weeks later.

The devastation felt by the Smither family and the determination of the volunteers inspired Lampson to establish the first-ever United States House Caucus on Missing and Exploited Children. Its purpose is to raise awareness of missing and exploited children matters, develop legislation, and support policies that protect children from abduction, exploitation, and abuse. The caucus has played a significant role in promoting the welfare of children and has worked on various initiatives to strengthen child protection laws, improve law enforcement efforts in cases involving missing and exploited children, and provide support and resources to the families of victims. Caucus members pushed through passage of legislation including the Protection of Children From Sexual Predators Act of 1998, Child Abuse Prevention and Enforcement Act of 2000, AMBER Alert System, Code Adam Act, Protecting Our Children Comes First Act of 2007, and the Adam Walsh Child Protection and Safety Act. It became the largest bi-partisan, issue-based caucus in the House and inspired the creation of an identical caucus in the Senate.

Lampson authored the Protecting Our Children Comes First Act of 2007. It passed the House and Senate. It was signed into law by President Bush on June 3, 2008.

He introduced and passed the SAFE Act of 2007 in the House. Its intent was to amend the federal criminal code to expand the reporting requirements with respect to violations of laws prohibiting sexual exploitation of children and child pornography. It died in the Senate. Provisions of the bill were adopted in the PROTECT Our Children Act of 2008 and signed into law.

Lampson worked closely with the National Center for Missing & Exploited Children and became known as a tireless advocate for their interests on Capitol Hill.

=== Transportation and infrastructure ===
Lampson won support for numerous projects benefiting Southeast Texas, including the Neches River Salt Water Barrier, funding for improving areas of the Gulf Intracoastal Waterway, port upgrades, and coastal and beach improvement projects. Other notable projects that he secured federal funding for include the Galveston Causeway, Galveston Island Trolley expansion, NASA 1 Bypass Freeway, and major renovations to the Ellington Field Joint Reserve Base's fire station.

He co-sponsored the Transportation Equity Act for the 21st Century. The landmark legislation affirmed President Clinton's key priorities: improving safety, protecting public health and the environment, and creating opportunity for all Americans.

Following the September 11 attacks, Lampson played a key role in passing Aviation Security legislation as a member of the Subcommittee on Aviation including the Aviation and Transportation Security Act. The bill created a new Transportation Security Administration.

He voted for the Maritime Transportation Antiterrorism Act.

He co-sponsored the Pipeline Safety Improvement Act of 2002.

Lampson included language in the U.S. Troop Readiness, Veterans' Care, Katrina Recovery, and Iraq Accountability Appropriations Act of 2007 waiving the local funding match required under the Stafford Act. It passed unanimously through the House Committee on Transportation and Infrastructure, and allowed Texas communities to qualify for disaster assistance programs, providing a savings to the State of Texas totaling upwards of $40 million.

=== NASA, the Johnson Space Center, and Human Space Flight ===
Lampson's congressional district included the Johnson Space Center in Houston, Texas. He established a reputation as a vocal advocate of the International Space Station, human space flights, and increased federal funding in support of NASA.

In 2002 and 2003, he introduced the Space Exploration Act, a bill to establish long-term goals for NASA and the nation's space program. This bill was largely adopted as policy by the Bush Administration in 2004.

In 2007, he secured more than $300 million in additional federal funding for NASA.

In 2008, twelve house members led by Lampson successfully urged House leaders to add $2 billion to NASA's budget in The National Aeronautics and Space Administration Authorization Act of 2008. The total budget was $20.2 billion. The additional funding allowed for a Space Shuttle flight to deliver the Alpha Magnetic Spectrometer to the International Space Station. The project measures antimatter in cosmic rays and searches for evidence of dark matter. Samuel C. Ting, Nobel prize winning physicist, is the lead researcher on the project. The budget increase also accelerated the development of the Orion Crew Exploration Vehicle (CEV) and Ares I Crew Launch Vehicle (CLV), which would replace the Space Shuttle.

Additional legislation supported by Lampson includes the National Aeronautics and Space Administration Authorization Act of 2000, the Commercial Space Transportation Competitiveness Act of 2000, the NASA Flexibility Act of 2004, the U.S. Commercial Space Launch Amendments Act of 2004, and the National Aeronautics and Space Administration Authorization Act of 2008.

He introduced the Amendment to the Iran Nonproliferation Act of 2003, seeking to allow NASA to help Russia purchase additional Soyuz and Progress vehicles if the President notifies Congress they are needed to ensure the safety of the crew aboard the International Space Station and to maintain its operational viability while the Space Shuttle fleet is grounded; it influenced the Bush administration's policy and led to passage of the Iran Nonproliferation Amendments Act of 2005.

Lampson was instrumental in passage of the U.S. Commercial Space Launch Amendments Act of 2004. It provided guidelines for regulating the safety of commercial human spaceflight in the United States under the oversight of the Federal Aviation Administration. It also paved the way for commercial space tourism. The bill's author, Congressman Dana Rohrabacher, credited Lampson among two other colleagues for being able to get this legislation passed.

=== Foreign affairs and travel ===
Lampson participated in the NATO Parliamentary Assembly and served as chairman of the Congressional Study Group on Germany, an inter-parliamentary assembly between the German Bundestag and the U.S. House of Representatives.

He was involved in the effort to expand NATO to include all of the Baltic States following the dissolution of the USSR. Traveling to each of the countries, he served as a delegate to help determine their membership eligibility.

The abduction of American children by a non-custodial parent and failure of countries such as Germany in honoring The Hague Convention on the Civil Aspects of International Child Abduction was an issue pressed by Lampson. He authored a concurrent resolution agreed to in the House and Senate calling on allied nations to "comply fully with both the letter and the spirit of their international legal obligations under the Convention to ensure their compliance to honor their commitments and return wrongfully abducted children to their place of habitual residence, and ensure parental access rights by removing obstacles to the exercise of those rights." Germany re-evaluated their non-compliance and put in place additional measures to honor the enforcement of international treaties compelling them to intervene in the return of abducted children to their country of origin.

Lampson was a member of the Cuba Working Group and a proponent of lifting trade embargoes. He co-sponsored the Cuban Food and Medicine Security Act of 1999, Bridges to the Cuban People Act of 2001, Freedom to Travel to Cuba Act of 2002, Export Freedom to Cuba Act of 2003, Bridges to the Cuban People Act of 2003, and Agricultural Export Facilitation Act of 2007.

In 1999, he traveled to Cuba with Southeast Texas rice farmers to meet President Fidel Castro and his government in an attempt to call for renewed agricultural trade between the United States and Cuba. Before a 1960s trade embargo, Cuba imported virtually all of its rice from the U.S. The members of the delegation played a major role in getting a landmark law signed by President Clinton the very next year: the Trade Sanctions Reform and Export Enhancement Act of 2000. For the first time in decades, it opened the door to modest trade with Cuba. As of 2016, that law has led to more than $5 billion in American exports to Cuba. In 2002, Lampson helped facilitate a deal to allow 30,000 metric tons of grain to be shipped to Cuba from the Port of Galveston for the first time in forty years.

In 2003, he traveled to Germany as part of a congressional delegation meeting with the German Bundestag. Part of the trip included a stop at Landstuhl Regional Medical Center, where he visited with wounded U.S. servicemen and women.

In 2008, he traveled to Afghanistan, Pakistan and India with Senator Ben Nelson, Congressman Allen Boyd, and Congressman Tim Mahoney. They met with Afghan President Hamid Karzai and Pakistani President Pervez Musharraf

== Political positions ==
The National Journal ranked Lampson as the most conservative Democrat in Texas. Rated as more conservative than 53 percent of House members and more liberal than 47 percent, he ranked as the sixth-most-conservative Democrat overall, behind lawmakers from Georgia, Mississippi and Oklahoma in 2008.

=== Abortion ===
Lampson generally favored abortion rights but opposed "partial-birth" abortion. His position on abortion was that it is a personal matter.

He voted in favor of a ban on partial birth/late term abortions.

In 2004, Lampson was one of forty-eight Catholic members of Congress that signed a letter to the cardinal archbishop of Washington, D.C., saying the threats by some bishops to deny communion to politicians who support abortion rights were "deeply hurtful," counterproductive and "miring the Church in partisan politics."

During his tenure, he averaged a 66% rating by NARAL Pro-Choice America.

=== Energy ===
Lampson believed in balanced energy policies supporting both traditional fossil fuel activities and viable renewable energy sources. He encouraged research and development in new energy technologies.

Lampson was an original co-sponsor of the United States-India Nuclear Cooperation Approval and Nonproliferation Enhancement Act. It formalized President Bush and Prime Minister Manmohan Singh's commitment in which India agreed to separate its civil and military nuclear facilities and to place all its civil nuclear facilities under International Atomic Energy Agency (IAEA) safeguards and, in exchange, the United States agreed to work toward a full civil nuclear alliance with India. It enhanced cooperation in using nuclear energy and reduced the danger of nuclear proliferation.

He introduced the Industrial Energy Efficiency Research and Development Act of 2007. It sought to support research and development of new industrial processes and technologies that optimize energy efficiency and environmental performance, utilize diverse sources of energy, and increase economic competitiveness. The bill passed the House but died in the Senate.

=== Iraq ===
Lampson voted in favor of authorizing the use of military force against Iraq in 2002 following the 9/11 terrorist attacks. In a 2019 statement on Facebook, Lampson expressed regret voting for the invasion into Iraq and believed the Bush administration misled Congress.

He voted in favor of referring a House resolution entitled "H.Res.1258 - Impeaching George W. Bush, President of the United States, of high crimes and misdemeanors" to the Judiciary Committee.

He was one of fifteen Democrats that voted against a bill that set a time table of withdrawing troops from Iraq by December 2008.

=== Clinton Impeachment ===
Lampson voted in favor of an Impeachment inquiry against Bill Clinton in 1998. He was one of only 31 Democrats to cross party lines to support it; they were referred to as "The group of 31". Half of the defectors were members of the Blue Dog coalition, a group of Democrats who represent the center of the political spectrum. Lampson ultimately voted against the Impeachment of Bill Clinton.

== Later career ==
=== 2012 Congressional election ===
After 14th District U.S. Congressman Ron Paul decided that he would not run for re-election to Congress in order to focus on his presidential campaign, Lampson filed papers to run for Congress in that 14th District. The 14th had been shifted well to the east in redistricting, and now included roughly 85 percent of the territory Lampson had represented during his first stint in Congress. Notably, Beaumont and Galveston, the largest cities in Lampson's old district, were now in the 14th. Lampson won the May 29, 2012 primary with 83.23% of the vote and faced State Rep. Randy Weber in the November 6th general election. Lampson was defeated by Weber on November 6, 2012, by a 53% to 45% margin. Lampson only carried his home county of Jefferson County and was unable to overcome the partisan lean of a district that was significantly redder than the territory he had previously represented.

=== 2018 judicial election ===
Lampson ran for county judge of Jefferson County in 2018. His opponent was Republican incumbent Jeff R. Branick. The election was held on November 6, 2018. He lost the election, 50.63% to 49.37%, a margin of 949 votes. Governor Greg Abbott, Senator Ted Cruz, and Sean Hannity made public appearances in Jefferson County in order to rally support for the vulnerable incumbent, who had switched to the Republican Party a year earlier. Lampson was endorsed by the Beaumont Enterprise. He focused his campaign on securing relief for victims of Hurricane Harvey and diversifying the economic development of Jefferson County.

=== Other work ===
Lampson has worked on seniors' issues at the local and national levels as a director of the Area Agency on Aging. He served as a delegate to the 1995 White House Conference on Aging. He is active with local organizations such as the American Heart Association, Land Manor (a rehabilitation facility), and the Young Men's Business League. He is a member of the Pi Kappa Alpha fraternity. He was chair of the 1995 Bishop's Faith Appeal at the Diocese of Beaumont.

== Awards and honors ==
In 2019, Austria's Habsburg family honored Lampson with the "Medal of Friendship" in recognition of his work as a leading advocate for the NASA space program, the relationships he built with international partners, and his overall commitment to peace.

In 2012, Lampson was honored as one of the "Legends of Galveston" at the Hilton Galveston Island Resort.

In 2008, Lampson was honored by the U.S. Chamber of Commerce with their prestigious "Spirit of Enterprise Award" in recognition of his pro-business voting record. During the same year he was the recipient of the National Federation of Independent Business (NFIB) Guardian of Small Business Award in recognition of his strong voting record and his efforts to increase business opportunities, reduce taxes, and eliminate overly burdensome taxes in the 110th Congress.

In 2004, the National Center for Missing and Exploited Children honored Lampson with the Congressional Leadership Award in recognition of his commitment to protecting American children. National television network Court TV honored Lampson with its first annual “Keep America Safe” award for his work on child safety issues.

The Laura Recovery Center honored Lampson with the Triangle of Trust Award. The award goes to individuals and organizations that have shown commitment to a relationship among law enforcement, communities and families of missing children.

In 2002, the Houston Chronicle ranked Lampson #1 in constituent services among all other Houston area congressmen.

The Bay Area Houston Economic Partnership honored Lampson with its prestigious Quasar Award for Exceptional Leadership in Economic Development in 1997.

He was recognized as the Outstanding Young Man of Beaumont in 1978 by the Texas Jaycees.

== Personal life ==
Lampson is married to Susan Floyd-Lampson, a retired special education teacher and former Ms. Port Arthur. They have two daughters, Hillary and Stephanie, and six grandchildren. He and his family reside in their hometown of Beaumont. He is a former healthcare executive and currently consults for tech and energy companies. He is a lifelong resident of Southeast Texas and a second-generation Italian-American.

Lampson underwent a successful quadruple bypass surgery on March 25, 2007, at the Texas Heart Institute. He is a Roman Catholic.

== Electoral history ==
Texas's 9th congressional district: Results 1996–2002
Year	Democrat	Votes	Pct	Republican	Votes	Pct	3rd Party	Party	Votes	Pct
1996	Nick Lampson *	83,782	44%	Steve Stockman *	88,171	46%	Geraldine Sam	Democratic	17,887	9%
1996	Nick Lampson	59,225	53%	Steve Stockman	52,870	47%				
1998	Nick Lampson	86,055	64%	Tom Cottar	49,107	36%				
2000	Nick Lampson	130,143	59%	Paul Williams	87,165	40%	F. Charles Knipp	Libertarian	2,508	1%
2002	Nick Lampson	86,710	59%	Paul Williams	59,635	40%	Dean L. Tucker	Libertarian	1,613	1%

* The 1996 election took place in two parts: an open special primary election on November 5, 1996, concurrent with the general election, followed by a runoff between the two highest vote-getters that took place on December 10, 1996 (as neither Lampson nor Stockman gained 50% of the vote). This was because a three-judge court of the U.S. District Court for the Southern District of Texas redrew the boundaries of districts 18, 29, and 30, and redrew portions of districts 3, 5, 6, 7, 8, 9, 22, 24, 25, and 26. The District Court further ordered that the candidates in these districts who have filed by August 30, 1996, and been certified by September 5, 1996, would compete in the open primary special election due to the lack of time for a normal primary. See Bush v. Vera.

Texas's 2nd congressional district: 2004 results
Year	Democrat	Votes	Pct	Republican	Votes	Pct	3rd Party	Party	Votes	Pct
2004	Nick Lampson	108,156	43%	Ted Poe	139,951	56%	Sandra Leigh Saulsbury	Libertarian	3,931	2%

Texas's 22nd congressional district: Results 2006–2008
Year	Democrat	Votes	Pct	Republican	Votes	Pct	3rd Party	Party	Votes	Pct	3rd Party	Party	Votes	Pct	
2006	(no candidate)			Shelley Sekula-Gibbs	76,924	62%	Bob Smither	Libertarian	23,425	19%	Steve Stockman	Republican	13,600	11%	*
2006	Nick Lampson	76,775	52%	(no candidate)			Shelley Sekula-Gibbs	Write-in	61,938	42%	Bob Smither	Libertarian	9,009	6%	*
2008	Nick Lampson	139,879	45%	Pete Olson	161,600	52%	John Wieder	Libertarian	6,823	2%					

*Write-in and minor candidate notes: In the 2006 special election for the remaining two months of DeLay's term, Republican Don Richardson received 7,405 votes and Republican Giannibicego Hoa Tran received 2,568 votes. In the 2006 general election, Don Richardson received 428 votes and Joe Reasbeck received 89 votes.

U.S. House of Representatives
Preceded by Steve Stockman	Member of the U.S. House of Representatives from Texas's 9th congressional district 1997–2005	Succeeded by Al Green
Preceded by Shelley Sekula-Gibbs	Member of the U.S. House of Representatives from Texas's 22nd congressional district 2007–2009	Succeeded by Pete Olson
U.S. order of precedence (ceremonial)
Preceded by Tom Rooney as Former U.S. Representative	Order of precedence of the United States as Former U.S. Representative	Succeeded by Bill Flores as Former U.S. Representative
