= Jury fees =

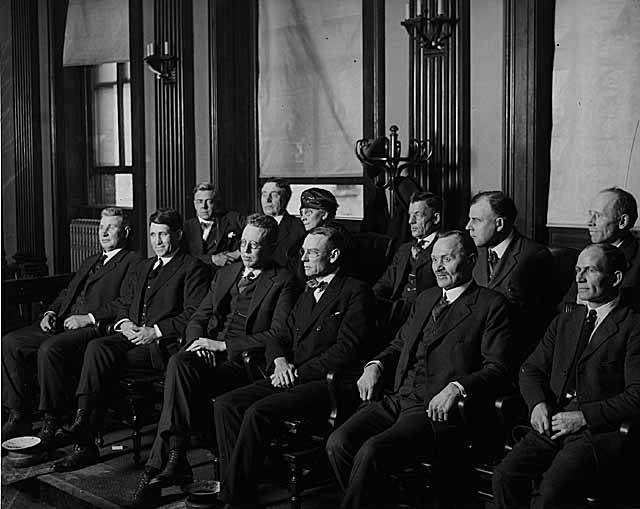
Federal grand jury in the Roy Olmstead bootlegging case in Seattle (1926).

Jury fees refer to the compensation provided to individuals serving as jurors. These fees are intended to offset the personal expenses incurred during jury service, though they often do not equate to standard employment wages.

== Australia ==
=== Federal court ===
Jurors serving in the Federal Court of Australia are entitled to an attendance fee and may claim travel allowances.

=== State courts ===
Each state and territory administers its own jury system. For example:

- New South Wales — Jurors receive A$106.3 per day for the first ten days. From the eleventh day onward, employed jurors receive A$247.4 per day, while unemployed jurors continue to receive A$106.3106.30 per day. Additionally, a travel allowance of A$0.307 per kilometer is provided.
- Queensland — Individuals summoned but not selected for a jury panel receive A$47.95 per day. Empaneled jurors earn A$143.4 per day, with an additional A$47.95 per day after the 20th weekday of service.
- Western Australia — Employers are required to continue paying the usual wages or salary to employees, regardless of their employment status (full-time, part-time, or casual), during jury service.

=== Employer obligations ===
Under the Fair Work Act 2009, full-time and part-time employees are entitled to ‘make-up pay’ for the first ten days of jury service. This ensures employees receive their usual base pay, with employers compensating the difference between the jury duty payment and the employee’s standard earnings. Casual employees are generally excluded from this entitlement.

State-specific legislation may impose additional obligations. For example, in New South Wales, employers are required to pay employees for the first ten days of jury service; this obligation does not extend to casual employees.

=== Taxation of jury fees ===
Attendance fees paid to employed jurors are considered assessable income and must be declared in tax returns, unless the fees are remitted to the employer.

== Canada ==
In Canada, each jurisdiction establishes its own policies regarding daily fees, employer obligations, and expense reimbursements.

=== Provincial laws ===
==== British Columbia ====
Jurors in British Columbia receive compensation based on the duration of their service:

- First 10 days: $20 per day
- Days 11 to 49: $60 per day
- Day 50 onward: $100 per day

Jurors may also be reimbursed for specific expenses, including parking, travel, and childcare, upon submission of receipts.

==== Ontario ====
Effective October 1, 2025, jury pay in Ontario is $125 per day from Day 1. Employers are not required to pay their employees while they are serving on juries. Some employers may choose to continue wages voluntarily.

Prior to October 1, 2025, juror compensation was structured as follows:

- First 10 days: Unpaid
- Days 11 to 49: $40 per day
- Day 50 onward: $100 per day

This pay scale had not changed since 1989 and was criticized for making it difficult for many potential jurors to serve, resulting in them requesting exemptions for reasons of financial hardship.

==== Nova Scotia ====
Jurors in Nova Scotia receive $40 per day for each day of service as well as reimbursement for travel expenses at a rate of 20 cents per kilometer and for parking costs.

== United Kingdom ==
=== Loss of earnings and care costs ===
Jurors can claim compensation for loss of earnings and certain care expenses, with amounts determined by the duration of daily court attendance and the length of service.

- First 10 days of service: Up to £64.95 per day for attendance exceeding 4 hours and up to £32.47 per day for attendance of 4 hours or less.
- After 10 days working days: Up to £129.91 per day for attendance exceeding 4 hours and up to £64.95 per day for attendance of 4 hours or less.

=== Travel expenses ===
Jurors are reimbursed for travel expenses incurred while commuting to court, with reimbursement rates depending on the mode of transportation.

- Public transport: Full cost of bus or standard-class train tickets
- Private vehicle: Mileage allowance of 31.4p per mile for cars and motorcycles
- Bicycle: Allowance of 9.6p per mile
- Taxi: Reimbursement of fare, subject to prior court approval

=== Subsistence allowance ===
To cover meals and refreshments during court attendance, jurors may claim a subsistence allowance based on the duration spent at court each day.

- Up to £5.71 per day for attendance up to 10 hours
- Up to £12.17 per day for attendance exceeding 10 hours

=== Employer obligations ===
Employers are not obligated to provide compensation during an employee’s jury service. If an employer chooses not to pay, the employee can claim a loss of earnings allowance from the court. Employers must complete a Certificate of Loss of Earnings.

== United States ==
=== Federal court ===
At the federal level, jurors receive an attendance fee of $50 per day for their service. This rate applies to both petit jurors, who serve on trial juries, and grand jurors, who participate in grand jury proceedings. For petit jurors serving more than ten days on a trial, the presiding judge has the discretion to increase the daily compensation to $60. Similarly, grand jurors may receive up to $60 per day after 45 days of service. Federal employees, excluding those working for the U.S. Postal Service, continue to receive their regular salaries during jury service and are not eligible for the standard juror attendance fee.

In addition to attendance fees, federal jurors are reimbursed for reasonable transportation expenses, including mileage and, in some instances, parking fees. If jurors are required to stay overnight due to the distance from the courthouse or the length of proceedings, they may also receive a subsistence allowance to cover meals and lodging.

=== State jury fees ===
Jury fees at the state level vary significantly across different jurisdictions, with each state establishing its own compensation rates and policies. For example, as of recent data, California compensates jurors at $15 per day starting from the second day of service, while New York provides $40 per day. Some states, such as Illinois and South Carolina, do not have a standardized statewide juror pay rate, leading to variations at the county or municipal levels.

Jury Fees and Employer Obligations by State
State	Daily Jury Fee	Employer Paid Time Off Requirement
Alabama	$40	Yes
Alaska	$25	No
Arizona	$12	No
Arkansas	$50	No
California	$15	No
Colorado	$50	Yes
Connecticut	$50	Yes
Delaware	$20	No
District of Columbia	$30	Yes
Florida	$30	No
Georgia	$50	No
Hawaii	$30	No
Idaho	$10	No
Illinois	—	No
Indiana	$15	No
Iowa	$30	No
Kansas	$10	No
Kentucky	$12.50	No
Louisiana	$25	Yes
Maine	$15	No
Maryland	$15	No
Massachusetts	$50	Yes
Michigan	$12.50	No
Minnesota	$20	No
Mississippi	$5	No
Missouri	$6	No
Montana	$12	No
Nebraska	$35	Yes
Nevada	$40	No
New Hampshire	$10	No
New Jersey	$5	No
New Mexico	$7.50	No
New York	$40	No
North Carolina	$12	No
North Dakota	$25	No
Ohio	$10	No
Oklahoma	$20	No
Oregon	$10	No
Pennsylvania	$25	No
Rhode Island	$15	No
South Carolina	—	No
South Dakota	$50	No
Tennessee	$10	Yes
Texas	$20	No
Utah	$18.50	No
Vermont	$30	No
Virginia	$30	No
West Virginia	$15	No
Wisconsin	$16	No
Wyoming	$40	No

=== Employer obligations ===
There is no federal mandate requiring employers to continue paying employees during their jury duty. Some states have enacted laws obligating employers to provide paid leave for jury service, while others leave this decision to the employer’s discretion.

== Other countries ==
Jury systems and associated fees vary globally. Some countries, such as South Africa, have abolished jury trials altogether. In nations like France and Germany, lay judges participate alongside professional judges, but traditional juries are uncommon.
