= Olmstead v. United States =

1928 United States Supreme Court case

- Supreme Court of the United States

Argued February 20–21, 1928 Decided June 4, 1928
- Full case name: Olmstead et al. v. United States; Green et al. v. United States; McInnis v. United States.
- Citations: 277 U.S. 438 (more) 48 S. Ct. 564; 67 L. Ed. 785; 1923 U.S. LEXIS 2588; 24 A.L.R. 1238

Case history
- Prior: Defendants convicted, 5 F.2d 712 (W.D. Wash. 1925); affirmed, 19 F.2d 842 (9th Cir. 1927)
- Subsequent: None

Holding
- The Fourth Amendment's proscription on unreasonable search and seizure did not apply to telephone wiretaps.

Court membership
- Chief Justice William H. Taft Associate Justices Oliver W. Holmes Jr. · Willis Van Devanter; James C. McReynolds · Louis Brandeis; George Sutherland · Pierce Butler; Edward T. Sanford · Harlan F. Stone

Case opinions
- Majority: Taft, joined by Van Devanter, McReynolds, Sutherland, Sanford
- Dissent: Holmes
- Dissent: Brandeis
- Dissent: Butler
- Dissent: Stone

Laws applied
- U.S. Const. amends. IV, V
- Overruled by
- Katz v. United States, 389 U.S. 347 (1967)

Olmstead v. United States, 277 U.S. 438 (1928), was a decision of the Supreme Court of the United States, on the matter of whether wiretapping of private telephone conversations, conducted by federal agents without a search warrant with recordings subsequently used as evidence, constituted a violation of the target’s rights under the Fourth and Fifth Amendments of the U.S. Constitution. In a 5–4 decision, the Court held that the constitutional rights of a wiretapping target have not been violated.

In an influential dissent, Justice Louis Brandeis stated that, "[The Founding Fathers] conferred, as against the Government, the right to be let alone – the most comprehensive of rights, and the right most valued by civilized men. To protect that right, every unjustifiable intrusion by the Government upon the privacy of the individual, whatever the means employed, must be deemed a violation of the Fourth Amendment."

This decision was overturned by Katz v. United States in 1967.

== Background ==
=== Seizure of evidence ===
Until 1914, the American judicial system largely followed the precepts of English common law on matters pertaining to the validity of introducing evidence in criminal trials. In most cases, the general philosophy was that the process to obtain the evidence had little to do with its admissibility in court. The only limiting factor was that police agents could not break the law when seizing the evidence.

In 1914, in the landmark case Weeks v. United States, the Supreme Court held unanimously that illegal seizure of items from a private residence was a violation of the Fourth Amendment, and established the exclusionary rule that prohibits admission of illegally obtained evidence in federal courts. Because the Bill of Rights did not at the time extend to the states, such a prohibition applied only to federal agents and covered only federal trials. It was not until the Supreme Court ruling in Mapp v. Ohio (1961) that the exclusionary rule was extended to state law enforcement officers as well.

=== Olmstead's complaint ===
The Olmstead case included several petitioners, one of whom was Roy Olmstead, who challenged their criminal convictions, arguing that the use of evidence obtained from wiretapped private telephone conversations amounted to a violation of the Fourth and Fifth Amendments.

The petitioners were convicted in the mid-1920s for conspiracy to violate the National Prohibition Act by unlawfully possessing, transporting, and selling alcohol. The evidence provided by the wiretapped telephone conversations disclosed "a conspiracy of amazing magnitude" to engage in bootlegging, involving the employment of some fifty persons; with the use of sea vessels for transportation, an underground storage facility in Seattle, and the maintenance of a central office fully equipped with executives, bookkeepers, salesmen, and an attorney.

Olmstead was the general manager of this bootlegging operation. The information that led to the conspiracy charges was largely obtained by four federal Prohibition officers who were able to intercept messages on his and other conspirators' telephones. No laws were violated in installing the wiretapping equipment, as the officers did not trespass upon either the homes or the offices of the defendants; instead, the equipment was placed in the streets near the houses and in the basement of their office building. The wiretapping went on for several months, and the records revealed significant details on the business transactions of the petitioners and their employees. Stenographic notes were made of the conversations, and their accuracy was affirmed by government witnesses.

Olmstead and the others were convicted on their criminal charges in Washington State in 1925 and sentenced to prison terms. They appealed their convictions with an argument of Constitutional violations; their first attempt at the Ninth Circuit Court of Appeals was unsuccessful. That decision was then appealed to the U.S. Supreme Court.

== Opinion of the court ==
Chief Justice William Howard Taft delivered the Opinion of the Court. Taft examined "perhaps the most important" precedent, Weeks v. United States, which involved a conviction for using the mail to transport lottery tickets. Taft wrote that per this precedent, the Fourth Amendment forbade the introduction of evidence in court if it had been obtained in violation of the amendment. This interpretation complies with the historical purpose of the Fourth Amendment, as it was intended to prevent the use of governmental force to search and seize a citizen’s personal property and effects.

However, Taft held that the United States did not consider telephone conversations to be protected as much as mailed and sealed letters: "The amendment does not forbid what was done here. There was no searching. There was no seizure. The evidence was secured by the use of the sense of hearing and that only. There was no entry of the houses or offices of the defendants." A search and seizure needed to occur physically on the defendants' premises; wiretapping did not because it took place on a publicly available telephone network that people used voluntarily. Taft pointed out that one can talk with another at a great distance via telephone, and suggested that, because the connecting wires were not in the petitioners’ houses or offices, they could not be subjected to the protections of the Fourth Amendment.

Taft suggested that Congress may extend such protections to telephone conversations by passing legislation that would prohibit their use in federal criminal trials. Until such legislation is passed, however, "the courts may not adopt such a policy by attributing an enlarged and unusual meaning to the Fourth Amendment," as there are no precedents that permit the Fourth Amendment to apply as a viable defense in cases where there had been no official search and seizure of the person, his papers, tangible material effects, or an actual physical invasion of property. Taft concluded that such wiretapping as occurred in this case did not amount to a search or seizure within the meaning of the Fourth Amendment.

=== Brandeis's dissent ===
Associate Justice Louis Brandeis wrote a dissenting opinion that became influential in later years. Brandeis noted that the government made no attempt to defend the methods employed by federal agents, and in fact conceded that wiretapping would be unreasonable if it were deemed a search or seizure. Brandeis attacked the proposition that expanding the Fourth Amendment to include protection of telephone conversations was inappropriate. At the time of the adoption of the Fourth and Fifth Amendments, he wrote, “force and violence” were the only means by which the government could compel self-incrimination.

However, with ongoing technological advances, the government had gained the ability to invade privacy in more subtle ways; furthermore, there is no reason to think that the rate of such technological advances would slow down. Brandeis argued that the mail is a public service furnished by the government, and the telephone is "a public service furnished by its authority." He concluded that there is no difference between a private telephone conversation and a sealed letter. In fact, "the evil incident to invasion of the privacy of the telephone is far greater than that involved in tampering with the mails." Brandeis concluded that the convictions against Olmstead and the others should be reversed due to the use of inadmissible evidence, while the government had invaded their privacy: “Can it be that the Constitution affords no protection against such invasions of individual security?”

Later commentators often made use of Brandeis's statement that "if the government becomes a lawbreaker, it breeds contempt for law; it invites every man to become a law unto himself; it invites anarchy. To declare that in the administration of the criminal law the end justifies the means—to declare that the government may commit crimes in order to secure the conviction of a private criminal—would bring terrible retribution. Against that pernicious doctrine this court should resolutely set its face." This passage was quoted by Timothy McVeigh at his 1997 trial for the bombing of the Federal Building in Oklahoma City.

In 2018, the "famous dissent" by Brandeis was cited affirmatively by the Supreme Court in Carpenter v. United States for the proposition that the courts are obligated to ensure that the "progress of science" does not erode Fourth Amendment protections as "subtler and more far-reaching means of invading privacy... become available to the Government".

== Impact ==
After his failed appeals, Roy Olmstead spent his 4-year prison sentence at the McNeil Island Correctional Institute in Washington State. He then became a carpenter. On December 25, 1935, President Franklin Delano Roosevelt granted him a full presidential pardon. Besides restoring his constitutional rights, the pardon remitted his court costs. Eventually, Olmstead became a well-known Christian Science practitioner who worked with prison inmates on an anti-alcoholism agenda until his death in 1966 at age 79.

In the year after Olmstead's death, the Supreme Court vacated his conviction via the Katz v. United States ruling, in which the nearly 40 year-old Olmstead precedent was overturned via a new interpretation of the Fourth Amendment as applicable "to certain areas or to tangible objects" beyond basic police searches of a suspect's home.

== See also ==
- List of United States Supreme Court cases, volume 277
