= Pitt Island (disambiguation) =

Pitt Island may refer to the following islands:

- Pitt Island, Chatham Archipelago, New Zealand
- Pitt Island (Canada), British Columbia, Canada
- Pitt Island (Washington), Puget Sound, Washington, United States
