= Kevin Coe =

American rapist (1947–2025)

Kevin Coe (born Frederick Harlan Coe, February 2, 1947 – December 3, 2025) was an American convicted rapist from Spokane, Washington, often referred to in the news media as the South Hill Rapist. As of May 2008, Coe was still a suspect in dozens of rapes, the number of which is unusually large; his convictions received an unusual amount of attention from appeals courts. His mother, Ruth, was convicted of hiring a hitman against Judge George Sheilds and Prosecutor Donald Brockett at her son's trial following his conviction. The bizarre relationship between Coe and his mother became the subject of a nonfiction book, Son: A Psychopath and his Victims, by the crime author Jack Olsen.

On July 31, 1982, Coe legally changed his first name to Kevin, a preference by which he had been known.

== Background, arrest and trial ==
Frederick Harlan Coe was born on February 2, 1947. During the wave of sexual assaults perpetrated in Spokane between 1978 and 1981, many involved an extreme level of physical injury to the victims. Due to a distinctive "signature", a gloved fist or fingers rammed in the mouth and throat of his victims, police suspected the rapes to be the work of a single offender, whom the media soon dubbed the South Hill Rapist.

In 1981, after a school custodian observed a car illegally parked in a bus drop-off zone during the time a rape occurred, police traced the vehicle registration to Gordon Coe, the managing editor of the Spokane Chronicle. The senior Coe was in charge of a program to receive tips on the rapist's identity. Gordon was ruled out due to his age; his son, Frederick — who later legally changed his name to Kevin — a former Las Vegas radio announcer and unsuccessful real estate agent, had the use of the car. Police placed a tracking device on the younger Coe's car and discovered that, in addition to targeting lone female joggers, he was apparently stalking city buses for victims. After several victims identified him in photo lineups, Coe was arrested on six charges of first-degree rape, although authorities believe he was actually responsible for numerous incidents of voyeurism, indecent exposure, indecent assaults and at least 43 rapes. One of Coe's victims was former KREM-TV and KING-TV meteorologist and former KHQ-TV anchor, Shelly Monahan, but her case was not one of the six; she underwent hypnosis, but was not able to identify her attacker.

Coe was originally put on trial in 1981 and convicted on four of the six charges of rape. The case was a strong circumstantial one: in addition to positive identification given by the six victims, Coe had received speeding tickets in the same areas right after the rapes occurred; his blood type matched that left at the scene; and like the rapist, he was a secretor, meaning his blood type showed up in his bodily fluids. Coe's alibi was that he was either having breakfast or dining with his parents during the time the attacks occurred, or else, as his socialite mother Ruth testified, teaming up with her in a mother-and-son vigilante squad to follow local buses in order to try to capture the real rapist themselves.

At sentencing, a psychiatrist hired by the defense testified that Coe had confessed to the sixth rape; this did nothing to reduce his consecutive sentences, which amounted to life plus 75 years. Coe would later recant this, claiming he had concocted the story thinking he would be sentenced to a psychosexual treatment center instead of prison.

In June 1984, three years after Coe's trial, the Washington Supreme Court tossed out all of his convictions, because many of the victims had been hypnotized before formally identifying him, in the hope of providing more details to the rapist's identity. Coe was released on bail for a year before the new proceeding, where he was retried on the four counts for which he had been convicted, and was convicted again on three and sentenced to life plus 55 years. His appeal of the new convictions also made it all the way to the Washington Supreme Court, which in 1985 overturned two and upheld one, where his accuser clearly saw his face during the attack, so there had been no need to hypnotize her.

== Ruth Coe's arrest ==
Three months after her son was convicted, Ruth Coe was arrested for trying to solicit the murder or maiming of her son's prosecutor and judge. She was convicted the next year and served several months in jail.

Her husband, Gordon, whose newspaper career was ended by the circumstances surrounding his son's conviction, called his wife's arrest a "clear case of entrapment".

Ruth Coe died in 1996 in Henderson, Nevada, aged 75; she was survived by her husband, son, and daughter. Gordon Coe died in 1999.

== Confinement history ==
Coe served the entire 25 years of his sentence at Walla Walla State Penitentiary. Maintaining his innocence, he did not attend any prison counseling programs. Coe became eligible for parole in 1992, but never applied.

In 1990, Washington passed the Community Protection Act, a "civil commitment" statute that allows the state to indefinitely retain dangerous sexually violent predators even after their criminal sentences ended. If found guilty by a jury of possessing a "mental defect" that makes them likely to reoffend, offenders are sent to the Special Commitment Center on McNeil Island, where they receive treatment for mental disorders linked to sexual deviancy. Prosecutors attempted to apply this statute to Coe; on December 22, 2007, a judge postponed the trial until his sentence was due for completion in September 2008.

While preparing for the hearing, a new search of the Spokane Police's evidence room turned up a box containing a rape kit slide with DNA, which was a match to Coe. However, the DNA evidence that matched Coe's was not for any of the other rape convictions that had been overturned, but for the rape for which he had just served time. Upon the completion of his prison sentence, Coe was transferred to McNeil Island to await the civil commit trial, which began on September 15, 2008. On October 15, 2008, the prosecution and defense rested their case. The next day, after several hours of deliberation, the jury decided that the prosecution had proven beyond reasonable doubt that Coe was a violent sexual predator; he was committed to McNeil Island indefinitely.

As of March 24, 2011, as reported in The Spokesman-Review, Coe's appeal of the trial proceeding to be civilly committed as a sexual predator was denied:

... 23 victims identified Coe as their attacker in crimes that occurred during the decade leading up to Coe's 1981 arrest. She [Psychologist Amy Phenix] enumerated another 30 sex crimes in which the victims could not identify their attacker, but said she believed Coe was the perpetrator because of similarities to the other attacks.

Coe was diagnosed with mixed personality disorder with narcissistic, histrionic and antisocial features. Coe also received a score of 25.3 on the Psychopathy Checklist, with nearly all of the core personality traits of psychopathy indicated.

== Release and death ==
In January 2025, Coe's attorney petitioned for his release from McNeil Island due to his deteriorating health, noting that he suffered from severe depression, stroke, and heart disease, resulting in mobility restrictions that required a walker. Coe requested release to a home in Spanaway. On October 2, a judge in Spokane ordered his release. State officials initially stated he would be placed in an adult home in Federal Way, Washington, but the King County Sheriff's Office later stated that due to "pushback" from that community he would be placed in Auburn, Washington.

Coe died on December 3, 2025, just two months after his release from prison, at the age of 78.

== See also ==
1995 Okinawa rape incident
