= Frederick Coe =

Frederick Coe may refer to:

- Fred Coe (1914–1979), American television producer and director
- Frederick Augustus Coe (1838–1929), English iron works manager
- Kevin Coe (born 1947), American convicted rapist, born and became notable under the name Frederick Harlan Coe
