= Kansas v. Crane =

- Supreme Court of the United States

Argued October 30, 2001 Decided January 22, 2002
- Full case name: Kansas, Petitioner v. Michael T. Crane
- Docket no.: 00-957
- Citations: 534 U.S. 407 (more) 122 S. Ct. 867; 151 L. Ed. 2d 856
- Argument: Oral argument

Holding
- The Constitution does not permit commitment of the type of dangerous sexual offender considered in Hendricks without a determination that the offender lacks self control.

Court membership
- Chief Justice William Rehnquist Associate Justices John P. Stevens · Sandra Day O'Connor; Antonin Scalia · Anthony Kennedy; David Souter · Clarence Thomas; Ruth Bader Ginsburg · Stephen Breyer

Case opinions
- Majority: Breyer, joined by Rehnquist, Stevens, O'Connor, Kennedy, Souter, Ginsburg
- Dissent: Scalia, joined by Thomas

Laws applied
- U.S. Const. amend. VIII

Kansas v. Crane, 534 U.S. 407 (2002), is a United States Supreme Court case in which the Court upheld the Kansas Sexually Violent Predator Act (SVPA) as consistent with substantive due process. The Court clarified that its earlier holding in Kansas v. Hendricks (1997) did not set forth a requirement of total or complete lack of control, but it noted that the US Constitution does not permit commitment of a sex offender without some lack-of-control determination.

== Background ==
Michael Crane pleaded guilty to aggravated sexual battery for two incidents on the same day in 1993. In the first, Crane exposed himself to a tanning salon attendant. Half an hour later, Crane exposed himself to the clerk in a video store, demanded her to perform oral sex on him, threatened to rape her, and left. After Crane's guilty plea, the state petitioned to have Crane evaluated and adjudicated a sexual predator under Kansas's SVPA, which permits the civil detention of a person convicted of any of several listed sexual offenses if it can be proven beyond a reasonable doubt that he suffers from a "mental abnormality," a disorder affecting his "emotional or volitional capacity which predisposes the person to commit sexually violent offenses," or a "personality disorder," either of "which makes the person likely to engage in repeat acts of sexual violence." Kan. Stat. Ann. §§59-29a02(a), (b) (2000 Cum. Supp.).

Several psychologists examined Crane and diagnosed him with exhibitionism and antisocial personality disorder. One psychologist concluded that the two diagnoses in combination placed Crane within the listed sexual disorders covered by the SVPA, "cit[ing] the increasing frequency of incidents involving [respondent], increasing intensity of the incidents, [respondent's] increasing disregard for the rights of others, and his increasing daring and aggressiveness." Another psychologist testified that Crane's behavior was marked by "impulsivity or failure to plan ahead," indicating his unlawfulness "was a combination of willful and uncontrollable behavior," id., at 584-585, 7 P. 3d, at 290. The state's experts agreed, however, that "[r]espondent's mental disorder does not impair his volitional control to the degree he cannot control his dangerous behavior." Id., at 581, 7 P. 3d, at 288.

Crane moved for a summary judgment which was denied by the trial court and gave jury instructions to the terms of the statute. Id., at 581, 7 P. 3d, at 287-288. The jury found that Crane was a sexual predator as defined by the SVPA. The Kansas Supreme Court reversed, holding the SVPA unconstitutional as Crane had only a personality disorder, rather than a volitional impairment. For such a person, it held, the state must show not merely a likelihood that the defendant would engage in repeat acts of sexual violence but also an inability to control violent behavior, based on Kansas v. Hendricks (1997).

== Decision ==
The court decided in a split 7–2 opinion that the Constitution does not permit commitment of the type of dangerous sexual offender that was considered in Hendricks without any lack-of-control evaluation. It concluded that the Kansas Supreme Court interpreted Kansas v. Hendricks too restrictively when it ruled that a sexual offender who has only an emotional or personality disorder, not a volitional impairment, must be found not to have the ability to control dangerous behavior.

The required standard of proof had to be sufficient to make the distinction between a dangerous sexual offender whose serious mental illness or abnormality made him eligible for civil commitment from the "dangerous but typical recidivist" offender convicted in an ordinary criminal case. However, the Court concluded that an absolute finding of lack of control was not necessary since otherwise, there would be a risk of barring the civil commitment of some highly-dangerous persons suffering severe mental abnormalities.

== Significance ==
This ruling made it substantially more difficult for States to place sex offenders in civil confinement after they've served their sentence.

== See also ==
- United States v. Comstock (2010)
- List of United States Supreme Court cases, volume 534
- List of United States Supreme Court cases
