= Gertrude Island =

Island in Washington, United States

Coordinates: 47°13′04″N 122°39′36″W

Gertrude Island is an island off of McNeil Island in the US state of Washington, named for the nearby village of Gertrude. It is located inside of Still Harbor, a small harbor on the northeastern banks of McNeil Island. The entire island is owned by the McNeil Island Correctional Facility.
