= Adam Walsh Child Protection and Safety Act =

U.S. federal statute

- Long title: An Act to protect children from sexual exploitation and violent crime, to prevent child abuse and child pornography, to promote internet safety, and to honor the memory of Adam Walsh and other child crime victims.
- Enacted by: the 109th United States Congress

Citations
- Public law: Pub.L. 109-248

Codification
- Titles amended: 34
- U.S.C. sections created: § 20911 et seq.

Legislative history
- Introduced in the House as H.R.4472 by Jim Sensenbrenner (R–WI) on December 8, 2005; Passed the House on March 8, 2006 (unanimous voice vote); Passed the Senate on July 20, 2006 (unanimous voice vote); Signed into law by President George W. Bush on July 27, 2006

United States Supreme Court cases
- United States v. Comstock, 560 U.S. 126 (2010); Carr v. United States, 560 U.S. 438 (2010); United States v. Juvenile Male, 564 U.S. 932 (2011); Reynolds v. United States, 565 U.S. 432 (2012); United States v. Kebodeaux, 570 U.S. 387 (2013); Nichols v. United States, No. 15-5238, 578 U.S. ___ (2016); Gundy v. United States, No. 17-6086, 588 U.S. ___ (2019); Alaska v. Wright, No. 20-940, 593 U.S. ___ (2021)

The Adam Walsh Child Protection and Safety Act is a federal statute that was signed into law by U.S. President George W. Bush on July 27, 2006. The Walsh Act organizes sex offenders into three tiers according to the crime committed, and mandates that Tier 3 offenders (the most serious tier) update their whereabouts every three months with lifetime registration requirements. Tier 2 offenders must update their whereabouts every six months with 25 years of registration, and Tier 1 offenders must update their whereabouts every year with 15 years of registration. Failure to register and update information is a felony under the law. States are required to publicly disclose information of Tier 2 and Tier 3 offenders, at minimum. It also contains civil commitment provisions for sexually dangerous people.

The Act also organizes all state and territory sex offender registries into one searchable national database and instructs each state and territory to apply identical criteria for posting offender data on the internet (i.e., offender's name, address, date of birth, place of employment, photograph, etc.). The Act was named after Adam Walsh, an American boy who was abducted from a Florida shopping mall in 1981 and later found murdered, his case remained unsolved for nearly 30 years.

As of 2024, the Justice Department reports that 18 states, 137 tribes and 4 territories have substantially implemented requirements of the Adam Walsh Act.

== History ==
The Adam Walsh Act emerged from Congress following the passage of separate bills in the House and Senate (H.R. 3132 and S. 1086 respectively). The Act is also known as the Sex Offender Registration and Notification Act (SORNA), the majority of the provisions of which were originally enacted under the Public Health and Welfare statutes at 42 U.S.C. § 16911 et seq, but were reclassified to the Crime Control and Law Enforcement statutes at 34 U.S.C. § 20911 in 2018. The act's provisions fall into four categories: a revised sex offender registration system, child and sex related amendments to federal criminal and procedure, child protective grant programs, and other initiatives designed to prevent and punish sex offenders and those who victimize children.

The sex offender registration provisions replace the Jacob Wetterling Act provisions with a statutory scheme under which states are required to modify their registration systems in accordance with federal requirements at the risk of losing 10% of their Byrne program law enforcement assistance funds. The act seeks to close gaps in the prior system, provide more information on a wider range of offenders, and make the information more readily available to the public and law enforcement officials.

In the area of federal criminal law and procedure, the act enlarges the kidnapping statute, increases the number of federal capital offenses, enhances the mandatory minimum terms of imprisonment and other penalties that attend various federal sex offenses, establishes a civil commitment procedure for federal sex offenders, authorizes random searches as a condition for sex offender probation and supervised release, outlaws internet date drug trafficking, permits the victims of state crimes to participate in related federal habeas corpus proceedings, and eliminates the statute of limitations for certain sex offenses and crimes committed against children.

The act revives the authorization of appropriations under the Police Athletic Youth Enrichment Act among its other grant provisions and requires the establishment of a national child abuse registry among its other child safety initiatives.

The Act also establishes a post-conviction civil commitment scheme. Section 4248 of the Act contains the Commitment Provision, which authorizes the federal government to initiate commitment proceedings with respect to any federal prisoner in the custody of the Bureau of Prisons. Under this provision, even prisoners who have never been previously charged with or convicted of a sex crime may be civilly committed after completing their entire prison sentence. Prior to Supreme Court review, the federal Circuit courts were split on the question of whether Congress had the authority to enact this provision. On May 17, 2010, the Supreme Court upheld the law, ruling in United States v. Comstock that the Civil Commitment Provision was within Congress's authority.

At the time of passage, at least 100,000 of more than a half million sex offenders in the United States and the District of Columbia were said to be 'missing' and unregistered as required by law. The act allocated federal funding to assist states in maintaining and improving these programs so a comprehensive system for tracking sex offenders and alerting communities would be developed. The Adam Walsh Child Protection and Safety Act was signed on the 25th anniversary of the abduction of Adam Walsh from a shopping mall in Florida; Walsh was found murdered 16 days after his abduction in 1981. Adam's father John Walsh, founder of the National Center for Missing and Exploited Children (NCMEC), was joined by other children's advocates to mount an aggressive campaign to get the bill passed into law. As part of the campaign, Walsh was joined by Congressman Jim Sensenbrenner, representatives from the NCMEC, and other victims' advocates and parents. These included Patty Wetterling, children's advocate from Minnesota and mother of Jacob Wetterling, who was abducted and murdered in October 1989; Mark Lunsford, whose daughter Jessica was killed in Florida in 2005; Linda Walker, the mother of North Dakota college student Dru Sjodin who was kidnapped and murdered by a released Minnesota sex offender in November 2003; and Erin Runnion, whose five-year-old daughter Samantha Runnion was raped and killed in California in 2002.

In 2019, the U.S. Supreme Court heard oral arguments in the case of United States v. Haymond, in which the U.S. Court of Appeals for the 10th Circuit had overturned a provision of the Adam Walsh Act that established a five-year mandatory minimum prison sentence, and a possible life without parole sentence, for sex offenders who, in a revocation hearing before a judge, are found by a preponderance of the evidence to have committed new sex offenses while on supervised release.

On June 26, 2019, the Supreme Court ruled in a 5–4 decision in United States v. Haymond that the defendant's Fifth and Sixth amendment rights to a trial by jury were violated. This shifted the burden of proof from preponderance of the evidence to beyond a reasonable doubt.

== Legal applications ==
- Gives the U.S. Attorney General the authority to apply the law retroactively.
- Gives a federal Judge the ability to civilly commit individuals who are in the custody of the federal prison system if it is proven that the individual (1) has engaged or attempted to engage in sexually violent conduct or child molestation; (2) suffers from a serious mental illness, abnormality, or disorder; and, (3) as a result, would have serious difficulty refraining from sexually violent conduct or child molestation if released. A hearing is available to the involuntarily committed individual every six months to reconsider their commitment status if requested by counsel or the person in the federal treatment program.
- Establishes a national database which will incorporate the use of DNA evidence collection and DNA registry and tracking of convicted sex offenders with Global Positioning System technology.
- The law defines and requires a three-tier classification system for sex offenders, based on offense committed, replacing the older system based on risk of re-offence.
- Tier 1 sex offenders are required to register for 10–15 years; tier 2 for 25 years and tier 3 offenders must register for 25 years to life.
- Increases the mandatory minimum incarceration period of 25 years for kidnapping or maiming a child and 30 years for sex with a child younger than 12 or for sexually assaulting a child between 13 and 17 years old.
- Allows courts to expand definition of sex crimes requiring registration through broad residual clause.
- Increases the penalties for sex trafficking of children and child prostitution.
- Widens federal funding to assist local law enforcement in tracking sexual exploitation of minors on the internet.
- Creates a national child abuse/neglect registry to protect children from being placed into the care of or adopted by people convicted of child abuse or child neglect.
- Limits the defense access to examine child exploitation material which is the subject of a charge, such that examination may only be conducted in a government building.

== Registration requirements ==
Registration requirements are defined by the type of offense the person was convicted of. Sex offenders are classified into three tiers, with offenders in certain tiers having the option to ask for a registration reduction hearing to request their registration time be reduced after having a clean record for a prescribed minimum period, an offender's record is considered to be clean if they have met all of the following conditions: (A) not been convicted of a crime where the sentence was greater than one year in jail; (B) not been convicted of any sex offense; (C) successfully completed all supervised release, parole & probation requirements; (D) successfully completed a sex offender treatment program that has been certified by their state of residence or the Attorney General. Tier 3 offenders are required to register for life, with the exception of offenders adjudicated as a juvenile delinquent, who can request a registration reduction hearing if they have maintained a clean record for 25 years after release from juvenile detention. Tier 2 offenders are required to register for 25 years after release from incarceration. Tier 1 offenders are required to register for 15 years after release, they can request a registration reduction hearing after maintaining a clean record for 10 years. Tier I registrants may be excluded from internet database, with exemption of those convicted of "specified offense against a minor".

Sex offenders that are 14 years of age or older at the time of the crime are required to register if they fit into the most serious tier (Tier 3), or were tried as adults.

== State registration requirements ==
While states have to abide by the federal general guidelines for sex offender level registration requirements, the actual requirements can vary from state to state, with some being stricter and others more lenient.

For example in the state of New York, Level 1 offenders are required to register for 20 years after release, with no option to petition the court for a reduction, they must update their address with local law enforcement yearly and report in person every three years to have an updated photo taken. Level 2 offenders are required to register for life, though they can petition the courts to be removed from the registry after 30 years with a clean record; they must report in person yearly to update their address and have their photo updated every three years. Level 3 offenders must register for life, and must report in person every 90 days to update their address and have their photo updated every year. Offenders can also petition the court to have their risk level modified; a district attorney may also make this request. New York also has additional designations that can be added to offenders of each level, offenders can be designated as a sexual predator, a sexually violent predator, or a predicate sex offender; an offender designated as one of those is required to register for life regardless of their registry level.

An example of a state where registration requirements are more lenient is Oregon, with their system working a bit differently. Sex offenders of all levels are required to register for life, however level 3 offenders can also request to be reclassified to level 2, and level 2 reclassified to level 1, if certain conditions are met. Offenders can only be considered for removal from the registry if they are a level 1 offender at the time of request. Level 1 offenders can request to be removed from the registry if the following conditions are met: (A) it has been 5 years since the successful completion of all post-release supervision requirements including parole, probation & sex offender treatment programs; (B) if they were previously classified as a level 2 offender, at least 5 years since they were reclassified as a level 1 offender; (C) have never been convicted of the following crimes: rape in the first degree, sodomy in the first degree, unlawful sexual penetration in the first degree, kidnapping in the first degree when committed with the intent to commit one of the aforementioned crimes or where victim was under 18; burglary in the first degree when committed with the intent to commit any felony sex crime; aggravated murder, murder in the first degree, murder in the second degree, manslaughter in the first degree, manslaughter in the second degree, or the attempted commission of any of those crimes that involved the commission of a misdemeanor or felony sex crime; (D) have never been convicted of a subsequent violent felony or violent class A misdemeanor (E) have never been classified as a level 3 predatory sexual offender, or a level 3 violent sexual offender; (F) were deemed to be a danger to others by a Psychiatric Security Review Board; (G) have never been convicted of a federal sex crime, or a sex crime in another state, that does not permit a petition for relief from reporting as a sex offender; and finally (H) must live, work, or go to school in the state of Oregon to file a petition for relief.

== Megan Nicole Kanka and Alexandra Nicole Zapp community notification program ==
The act also included a requirement for law enforcement to notify certain people and agencies when a sex offender registers or updates their registry within the vicinity of their residence. The program was named after Megan Nicole Kanka, a seven-year-old-girl from New Jersey who was lured by her neighbor, 33-year-old Jesse Timmendequas, into his house where he raped and murdered her by strangulation in 1994, unknown to Megan's parents Timmendequas had two prior convictions for aggravated sexual abuse of a five-year-old girl in 1979 and of a seven-year-old girl in 1981. Alexandra Nicole Zapp was a 30-year old woman from Portland, Oregon who was working in Boston. On July 18, 2002 she stopped at a rest area in Bridgewater, Massachusetts and was cornered in the women's restroom by Paul Leahy, a 40 year old repeat sex offender who stabbed her in the chest six times, an off-duty Massachusetts State Trooper heard Alex's scream and arrested Leahy while he was attacking her, but too late to save her life. Both Megan and Alex were killed by predicate sex offenders which the local law enforcement and community had no knowledge of.

The notification program is enacted at 34 U.S.C. §20923. It requires that immediately after a sex offender registers or updates a registration, the agency the offender registers with shall provide the information about that offender to the following:

- The Attorney General, who shall upload that information to the National Sex Offender Registry.
- The appropriate local law enforcement agencies, including city police, county sheriff & state police, and any school and public housing agency, in each area in which the individual lives, works or is a student.
  - Each of the previously mentioned agencies and institutions in the jurisdiction where the offender lives, works, or goes to school from or to which a change in residence, employment or student status occurs.
- Any local agency responsible for conducting background checks for employment or firearm purchases.
- Any and all local child welfare and social service agencies.
- Any and all volunteer programs or organizations where contact with minors or vulnerable persons might occur.
- Any organization, company, or individual who requests such notification as directed by state and federal law.
- Any individuals, and their immediate family, who were a victim of the offender, if the offender is classified as a level 3 offender, or a sexual predator or violent sexual predator.

== Effects ==
In some states the Adam Walsh Act (AWA) effectively expanded the registries as much as 500%. Since its enactment, critics have expressed concerns about the act's scope and breadth. Several sex offenders were prosecuted under its regulations before any state adopted AWA. This has resulted in one life sentence for failure to register, due to the offender being homeless and not being able to maintain a physical address. The Adam Walsh Act requires anyone convicted of a sex crime to register as a sex offender where it will be posted on the internet for all to see.

A study conducted in Ohio found that retroactive AWA reclassification increased the number of offenders and altered their placement in management categories. Prior to implementation of AWA in Ohio 76% of adult and 88% of juvenile offenders were designated on the least restrictive category or did not have to register at all, while only 20% of adults and 5% of juveniles were classified as "sexual predators", the most restrictive category. Following reclassification this basic pattern was reversed, with 13% of adults and 22% of juveniles placed in Tier 1, 31% of adults and 32% of juveniles placed in Tier 2, and 55% of adults and 46% of juveniles placed in the highest and most restrictive Tier 3. 41% of adults and 43% of juveniles previously in lowest category and 59% of adults and 45% of juveniles who were not previously registered at all were assigned to Tier 3.

However, the Ohio Supreme Court in 2010 ruled that the Adam Walsh Act as enacted in Ohio does not apply retroactively to individuals who committed their crimes prior to its effective date of January 1, 2008.

The Federal Record Keeping and Labeling Requirements Laws have been attached to this bill (18 U.S.C. 2257). In regard to pornography, this will extend the responsibility of keeping record of performers, to verify they are above age, to “secondary producers,” along with primary producers.

== Influence on visa process ==
A collateral effect of the new legislation was its implications on the United States Permanent Resident Card process. Until January 2007, U.S. nationals living abroad who married a local and intended to obtain green cards for their spouse and any immediate family members were able to initiate and complete the majority of the application process at the local U.S. Embassy/Consulate. However, because of the newly enhanced background check and criminal history data trail requirements, the new law had initially been interpreted by the Bureau of Consular Affairs and USCIS as leaving Consular officers ill-equipped to fully handle the I-130 adjudication process. Thus, as of January 2007, I-130 petitions, supporting documentation, or fee payments could no longer be completed in the country of the foreign national.

However, the government reversed this decision only two months later. Due to a significant number of complaints from applicants about the resulting processing delays and from immigration officials about the large amount of paperwork that came with the centralization of the process, the visa petitioning process for immediate relatives of US citizens was resumed at U.S. embassies on March 21, 2007. However, all embassies were required to add a 6-month residency requirement for the US Citizen to file an application directly.

The Act also for the first time limits the rights of citizens or permanent residents to petition to immigrate their spouse or other relatives to the U.S. if the petitioner has a listed child sex abuse conviction. If that is the case, then the petition cannot be approved unless the Department of Homeland Security determines in its unreviewable discretion that there is no risk of harm to the beneficiary or derivative beneficiary.

For Adam Walsh Act Immigration cases, the citizen must submit evidence beyond a reasonable doubt that he or she poses no risk to the beneficiary. The UCIS wants information all known factors that are relevant for determining whether petitioner poses any risk to the safety and well-being of the beneficiary including Certified evaluations by psychiatrists, clinical psychologists, or clinical social workers that attest to the degree of the petitioner’s rehabilitation or behavior modification; such evaluations should include an assessment by the author/clinician concerning whether the petitioner continues to pose a risk.

== See also ==
- National Center for Missing and Exploited Children
- Senate Caucus on Missing, Exploited and Runaway Children
- House Caucus on Missing and Exploited Children
