= Donald Brockett =

American lawyer (1936–2025)

Donald C. Brockett (July 8, 1936 – November 14, 2025) was an American attorney in the state of Washington. He was the Prosecuting Attorney of Spokane County, Washington. He is prominently known as the prosecuting attorney in the 1981 rape trial of Kevin Coe. After Coe was convicted of a series of rapes in Spokane's South Hill neighborhood, Spokane County Superior Court Judge George Shields sentenced him to a Life sentence, plus 75 years. Three months later, Coe's mother was arrested for attempting to solicit a "hit man" to murder Shields and make Brockett an "addlepated vegetable in diapers for the rest of his life". The rape case became the subject of Jack Olson's book, Son: A Psychopath and his Victims, which was later adapted into the 1991 film, Sins of the Mother (1991 TV film). After his retirement, Brockett served as an attorney with the Spokane law firm of Phillabaum, Ledlin, Matthews & Sheldin, PLLC. By 2015, Brockett was retired from law practice.

== Background ==
Brockett was born in Chicago, Illinois on July 8, 1936. When he was six years old, the family moved to Los Angeles and then Santa Barbara, California, before arriving in Spokane in 1947. He attended Lewis and Clark High School, graduating in 1954, and Gonzaga University School of Law, graduating with a Bachelor of Laws (LLB) in 1961. He was married to the former Jean Corigliano, and together they had five children. As of 2015 they had 13 grandchildren and 9 great-grandchildren.

On January 8, 1987, Brockett's daughter was reported missing after failing to return to the Ellensburg, Washington, airport in a Cessna 150 that she and her friend had rented. After families and friends of the two women continued searching, the plane was found two months later, and Lisa Brockett and her friend Christine Karstetter, who was flying the plane, were found dead in the wreckage in a rugged ravine located 15 miles from the Ellensburg airport.

Brockett died November 14, 2025, at the age of 89.

== Career ==
Following his graduation from Gonzaga Law School in 1961, Brockett became a Spokane County Deputy Prosecuting Attorney, serving in that capacity until 1969. Upon the 1969 retirement of the incumbent Prosecuting Attorney George Kain, Brockett was appointed by the Spokane County Board of Commissioners to replace Kain as the Prosecuting Attorney. He was subsequently elected to the position by voters in 1970. He was re-elected several times as he continued to serve in this capacity until the end of 1994, when he retired. He entered private practice with Phillabaum, Ledlin, Matthews & Sheldon, PLLC in 1997.

=== Prominent cases and book ===
Brockett was involved in the cases of Kevin Coe, Billy Worl, Al Hegge, and three death penalty cases. He argued many cases in the Supreme and Appellate courts of Washington and argued a case, Aldinger v. Howard, 427 U.S. 1, (1976) in the United States Supreme Court. In 2015, he published the book "The Tyrannical Rule of the U.S. Supreme Court, How the Court has violated the Constitution."
