= United States v. Comstock =

- Supreme Court of the United States

Argued January 12, 2010 Decided May 17, 2010
- Full case name: United States, Petitioner v. Graydon Earl Comstock, Jr., et al.
- Docket no.: 08-1224
- Citations: 560 U.S. 126 (more) 130 S. Ct. 1949; 176 L. Ed. 2d 878
- Argument: Oral argument

Case history
- Prior: 507 F. Supp. 2d 522 (E.D.N.C. 2007); affirmed, 551 F.3d 274 (4th Cir. 2009); cert. granted, 557 U.S. 918 (2009).
- Subsequent: On remand, 627 F.3d 513 (4th Cir. 2010).

Holding
- The federal government may order the civil commitment of a mentally ill, sexually dangerous person beyond the conclusion of his federal sentence.

Court membership
- Chief Justice John Roberts Associate Justices John P. Stevens · Antonin Scalia; Anthony Kennedy · Clarence Thomas; Ruth Bader Ginsburg · Stephen Breyer; Samuel Alito · Sonia Sotomayor

Case opinions
- Majority: Breyer, joined by Roberts, Stevens, Ginsburg, Sotomayor
- Concurrence: Kennedy (in judgment)
- Concurrence: Alito (in judgment)
- Dissent: Thomas, joined by Scalia (all but Part III–A–1–b)

United States v. Comstock, 560 U.S. 126 (2010), was a decision by the Supreme Court of the United States, which held that the federal government has authority under the Necessary and Proper Clause to require the civil commitment of individuals already in Federal custody. The practice, introduced by the Adam Walsh Child Protection and Safety Act, was upheld against a challenge that it fell outside the enumerated powers granted to Congress by the Constitution. The decision did not rule on any other aspect of the law's constitutionality, because only the particular issue of Congressional authority was properly before the Court.

== Background ==
Six days before Graydon Earl Comstock was to have completed a 37-month sentence for receiving child pornography, Attorney General Alberto R. Gonzales certified that Comstock was a sexually dangerous person. The law that Attorney General Gonzales was applying was ruled unconstitutional by lower courts on the grounds it exceeded Congress's constitutional authority. Argued in January 2010 by Solicitor General Elena Kagan, the position of the United States was that the Necessary and Proper Clause gave Congress the power to enact the law.

== Decision ==
Stephen Breyer delivered the opinion of the Court, which decided that the Necessary and Proper Clause permitted Congress to enact such a provision. John Roberts, John Paul Stevens, Ruth Bader Ginsburg, and Sonia Sotomayor joined Breyer's opinion. Anthony Kennedy and Samuel Alito filed opinions concurring in the judgment. Clarence Thomas filed a dissenting opinion in which Antonin Scalia joined in all but Part III–A–1–b.

=== Five considerations ===
The Court said: "We base this conclusion on five considerations, taken together."

1. The Necessary and Proper Clause grants Congress broad power to enact laws that are "rationally related" and "reasonably adapted" to executing the other enumerated powers.
2. The statute at issue "constitutes a modest addition" to related statutes that have existed for many decades.
3. The statute in question reasonably extends the longstanding policy to cover the mentally ill and sexually dangerous persons already in federal custody.
4. The statute properly accounts for state interests by ending the federal government's role "with respect to an individual covered by the statute" whenever a state requests.
5. The statute is narrowly tailored to address only the legitimate federal interest.

== See also ==
- United States federal laws governing defendants with mental diseases or defects
- Kansas v. Hendricks (1997)
- Kansas v. Crane (2002)
