= List of United States Supreme Court cases, volume 277 =

Supreme Court of the United States
- Interactive map of Supreme Court of the United States
- 38°53′26″N 77°00′16″W
- Established: March 4, 1789; 236 years ago
- Location: Washington, D.C.
- Coordinates: 38°53′26″N 77°00′16″W
- Composition method: Presidential nomination with Senate confirmation
- Authorised by: Constitution of the United States, Art. III, § 1
- Judge term length: life tenure, subject to impeachment and removal
- Number of positions: 9 (by statute)
- Website: supremecourt.gov

This is a list of cases reported in volume 277 of United States Reports, decided by the Supreme Court of the United States in 1928.

== Justices of the Supreme Court at the time of volume 277 U.S. ==
The Supreme Court is established by Article III, Section 1 of the Constitution of the United States, which says: "The judicial Power of the United States, shall be vested in one supreme Court . . .". The size of the Court is not specified; the Constitution leaves it to Congress to set the number of justices. Under the Judiciary Act of 1789 Congress originally fixed the number of justices at six (one chief justice and five associate justices). Since 1789 Congress has varied the size of the Court from six to seven, nine, ten, and back to nine justices (always including one chief justice).

When the cases in volume 277 were decided the Court comprised the following nine members:

| Portrait | Justice | Office | Home State | Succeeded | Date confirmed by the Senate (Vote) | Tenure on Supreme Court |
|---|---|---|---|---|---|---|
| | William Howard Taft | Chief Justice | Connecticut | Edward Douglass White | June 30, 1921 (Acclamation) | July 11, 1921 – February 3, 1930 (Retired) |
| | Oliver Wendell Holmes Jr. | Associate Justice | Massachusetts | Horace Gray | December 4, 1902 (Acclamation) | December 8, 1902 – January 12, 1932 (Retired) |
| | Willis Van Devanter | Associate Justice | Wyoming | Edward Douglass White (as Associate Justice) | December 15, 1910 (Acclamation) | January 3, 1911 – June 2, 1937 (Retired) |
| | James Clark McReynolds | Associate Justice | Tennessee | Horace Harmon Lurton | August 29, 1914 (44–6) | October 12, 1914 – January 31, 1941 (Retired) |
| | Louis Brandeis | Associate Justice | Massachusetts | Joseph Rucker Lamar | June 1, 1916 (47–22) | June 5, 1916 – February 13, 1939 (Retired) |
| | George Sutherland | Associate Justice | Utah | John Hessin Clarke | September 5, 1922 (Acclamation) | October 2, 1922 – January 17, 1938 (Retired) |
| | Pierce Butler | Associate Justice | Minnesota | William R. Day | December 21, 1922 (61–8) | January 2, 1923 – November 16, 1939 (Died) |
| | Edward Terry Sanford | Associate Justice | Tennessee | Mahlon Pitney | January 29, 1923 (Acclamation) | February 19, 1923 – March 8, 1930 (Died) |
| | Harlan F. Stone | Associate Justice | New York | Joseph McKenna | February 5, 1925 (71–6) | March 2, 1925 – July 2, 1941 (Continued as chief justice) |

== Notable Case in 277 U.S. ==
=== Olmstead v. United States ===
In Olmstead v. United States, 277 U.S. 438 (1928), the Supreme Court reviewed whether the use of wiretapped private telephone conversations, obtained by federal agents without judicial approval and subsequently used as evidence, constituted a violation of the defendant's rights provided by the Fourth and Fifth Amendments. The Court held that neither the Fourth Amendment nor the Fifth Amendment rights of the defendant were violated. This decision was overturned by Katz v. United States in 1967.

== Citation style ==
Under the Judiciary Act of 1789 the federal court structure at the time comprised District Courts, which had general trial jurisdiction; Circuit Courts, which had mixed trial and appellate (from the US District Courts) jurisdiction; and the United States Supreme Court, which had appellate jurisdiction over the federal District and Circuit courts—and for certain issues over state courts. The Supreme Court also had limited original jurisdiction (i.e., in which cases could be filed directly with the Supreme Court without first having been heard by a lower federal or state court). There were one or more federal District Courts and/or Circuit Courts in each state, territory, or other geographical region.

The Judiciary Act of 1891 created the United States Courts of Appeals and reassigned the jurisdiction of most routine appeals from the district and circuit courts to these appellate courts. The Act created nine new courts that were originally known as the "United States Circuit Courts of Appeals." The new courts had jurisdiction over most appeals of lower court decisions. The Supreme Court could review either legal issues that a court of appeals certified or decisions of court of appeals by writ of certiorari. On January 1, 1912, the effective date of the Judicial Code of 1911, the old Circuit Courts were abolished, with their remaining trial court jurisdiction transferred to the U.S. District Courts.

Bluebook citation style is used for case names, citations, and jurisdictions.

- "# Cir." = United States Court of Appeals
  - e.g., "3d Cir." = United States Court of Appeals for the Third Circuit
- "D." = United States District Court for the District of . . .
  - e.g.,"D. Mass." = United States District Court for the District of Massachusetts
- "E." = Eastern; "M." = Middle; "N." = Northern; "S." = Southern; "W." = Western
  - e.g.,"M.D. Ala." = United States District Court for the Middle District of Alabama
- "Ct. Cl." = United States Court of Claims
- The abbreviation of a state's name alone indicates the highest appellate court in that state's judiciary at the time.
  - e.g.,"Pa." = Supreme Court of Pennsylvania
  - e.g.,"Me." = Supreme Judicial Court of Maine

== List of cases in volume 277 U.S. ==
| Case Name | Page and year | Opinion of the Court | Concurring opinion(s) | Dissenting opinion(s) | Lower Court | Disposition |
|---|---|---|---|---|---|---|
| Blodgett v. Silberman | 1 (1928) | Taft | none | none | Conn. Super. Ct. | multiple |
| Williams v. Great Southern Lumber Company | 19 (1928) | Sanford | none | none | 5th Cir. | affirmed |
| Brooke v. City of Norfolk | 27 (1928) | Holmes | none | none | Va. | reversed |
| Coffin Brothers and Company v. Bennett | 29 (1928) | Holmes | none | none | Ga. | affirmed |
| Louisville Gas and Electric Company v. Coleman | 32 (1928) | Sutherland | none | Holmes; Brandeis | Ky. | reversed |
| City of Gainesville v. Brown-Crummer Investment Company | 54 (1928) | Taft | none | none | 5th Cir. | reversed |
| Dugan v. Ohio | 61 (1928) | Taft | none | none | Ohio | affirmed |
| Compania de Navegacion Interior, S.A. v. Fireman's Fund Insurance Company | 66 (1928) | Taft | none | none | 5th Cir. | reversed |
| Gaines v. Washington | 81 (1928) | Taft | none | none | Wash. | dismissed |
| Ferry v. Ramsey | 88 (1928) | Holmes | none | Sutherland | Kan. | affirmed |
| L.P. Larson, Jr., Company v. W. Wrigley, Jr., Company | 97 (1928) | Holmes | none | none | 7th Cir. | reversed |
| King Manufacturing Company v. City of Augusta | 100 (1928) | VanDevanter | none | Brandeis | Ga. | affirmed |
| Sultan Railway and Timber Company v. Department of Labor and Industries of Washington | 135 (1928) | VanDevanter | none | Brandeis | Wash. | affirmed |
| Hamburg-American Line Terminal and Navigation Company v. United States | 138 (1928) | McReynolds | none | none | Ct. Cl. | reversed |
| Long v. Rockwood | 142 (1928) | McReynolds | none | Holmes | Mass. Super. Ct. | affirmed |
| Plamals v. Steamship "Pinar Del Rio" | 151 (1928) | McReynolds | none | none | 2d Cir. | affirmed |
| St. Louis Southwestern Railway Company v. Nattin | 157 (1928) | McReynolds | none | none | W.D. La. | affirmed |
| Standard Pipe Line Company v. Miller County Highway and Bridge District | 160 (1928) | McReynolds | none | none | 8th Cir. | reversed |
| Sprout v. City of South Bend | 163 (1928) | Brandeis | none | none | Ind. | reversed |
| Great Northern Railroad Company v. United States | 172 (1928) | Brandeis | none | none | D. Minn. | affirmed |
| Nectow v. City of Cambridge | 183 (1928) | Sutherland | none | none | Mass. | reversed |
| Springer v. Government of the Philippine Islands | 189 (1928) | Sutherland | none | Holmes; McReynolds | Phil. | affirmed |
| Federal Intermediate Credit Bank of Columbia, South Carolina v. Mitchell | 213 (1928) | Butler | none | none | 4th Cir. | reversed |
| Panhandle Oil Company v. Mississippi ex rel. Knox | 218 (1928) | Butler | none | Holmes; McReynolds | Miss. | reversed |
| Buzynski v. Luckenbach Steamship Company, Inc. | 226 (1928) | Sanford | none | none | 5th Cir. | reversed |
| United States v. Goldman | 229 (1928) | Sanford | none | none | S.D. Ohio | reversed |
| Reinecke v. Gardner | 239 (1928) | Stone | none | none | 7th Cir. | certification |
| Holland Furniture Company v. Perkins Glue Company | 245 (1928) | Stone | none | none | 6th Cir. | reversed |
| Jenkins v. National Surety Company | 258 (1928) | Stone | none | none | 8th Cir. | reversed |
| Ex parte Williams | 267 (1928) | Brandeis | none | none | D. Neb. | mandamus denied |
| Willing v. Chicago Auditorium Association | 274 (1928) | Brandeis | Stone | none | 7th Cir. | reversed |
| Baltimore and Ohio Railroad Company v. United States | 291 (1928) | Butler | none | none | N.D. Ill. | reversed |
| McCoy v. Shaw | 302 (1928) | Sanford | none | none | Okla. | dismissed |
| Southern Pacific Company v. Haglund | 304 (1928) | Sanford | none | none | 9th Cir. | affirmed |
| Stipcich v. Metropolitan Life Insurance Company | 311 (1928) | Stone | none | none | 9th Cir. | reversed |
| The Malcolm Baxter, Jr. | 323 (1928) | Stone | none | none | 2d Cir. | affirmed |
| Mellon, Director General of Railroads v. Goodyear | 335 (1928) | McReynolds | none | none | Kan. | reversed |
| Midland National Bank of Minneapolis v. Dakota Life Insurance Company | 346 (1928) | Brandeis | none | none | 8th Cir. | reversed |
| Ribnik v. McBride | 350 (1928) | Sutherland | Sanford | Stone | N.J. | reversed |
| Reed v. Delaware County | 376 (1928) | Butler | none | none | 3d Cir. | affirmed |
| Quaker City Cab Company v. Pennsylvania | 389 (1928) | Butler | none | Holmes; Brandeis; Stone | Pa. | reversed |
| National Leather Company v. Massachusetts | 413 (1928) | Sanford | none | McReynolds | Mass. | affirmed |
| Sisseton and Wahpeton Bands of Sioux Indians v. United States | 424 (1928) | Stone | none | none | Ct. Cl. | affirmed |
| Olmstead v. United States | 438 (1928) | Taft | none | Brandeis; Holmes; Butler; Stone | 9th Cir. | affirmed |
| Kinney-Coastal Oil Company v. Kieffer | 488 (1928) | VanDevanter | none | none | 8th Cir. | reversed |
| National Life Insurance Company v. United States | 508 (1928) | McReynolds | none | Brandeis; Stone | Ct. Cl. | reversed |
| Hemphill v. Orloff | 537 (1928) | McReynolds | none | none | Mich. | affirmed |
| Williamsport Wire Rope Company v. United States | 551 (1928) | Brandeis | none | none | Ct. Cl. | affirmed |
| Ex parte Collins | 565 (1928) | Brandeis | none | none | D. Ariz. | mandamus denied |
