= Kansas v. Hendricks =

- Supreme Court of the United States

Argued December 10, 1996 Decided June 23, 1997
- Full case name: Kansas v. Leroy Hendricks
- Citations: 521 U.S. 346 (more) 117 S. Ct. 2072; 138 L. Ed. 2d 501
- Argument: Oral argument

Case history
- Prior: In re Hendricks, 259 Kan. 246, 912 P.2d 129 (1996); cert. granted, 518 U.S. 1004 (1996).

Holding
- Reverses Kansas Supreme Court and agrees with the state's procedures for the indefinite civil commitment procedures for sex offenders meeting the definition of a "mental abnormality" upon release from prison

Court membership
- Chief Justice William Rehnquist Associate Justices John P. Stevens · Sandra Day O'Connor; Antonin Scalia · Anthony Kennedy; David Souter · Clarence Thomas; Ruth Bader Ginsburg · Stephen Breyer

Case opinions
- Majority: Thomas, joined by Rehnquist, O'Connor, Scalia, Kennedy
- Dissent: Breyer, joined by Stevens, Souter, Ginsburg

Laws applied
- Due Process, Miscellaneous; Criminal Procedure, Ex Post Facto

Kansas v. Hendricks, 521 U.S. 346 (1997), was a United States Supreme Court case in which the Court set forth procedures for the indefinite civil commitment of prisoners who are convicted of a sex offense and are deemed by the state to be dangerous because of a mental abnormality.

== Background ==
Under Kansas's Sexually Violent Predator Act (Act), any person who has a "mental abnormality" or "personality disorder" and so is likely to engage in "predatory acts of sexual violence" may be indefinitely confined. Leroy Hendricks and Tim Quinn had extensive histories of sexually abusing children. When they were due to be released from prison, Kansas filed a petition under the Act in state court to involuntarily commit Hendricks and Quinn. Hendricks and Quinn challenged the constitutionality of the Act and requested a trial by jury, which the court granted. Hendricks and Quinn testified during the trial that they agreed with the diagnosis by the state psychiatrist that they suffer from pedophilia and admitted that they continued to experience uncontrollable sexual desires for children when under extreme stress. The jury decided that they qualified as sexually violent predators. Since pedophilia is defined as a mental abnormality under the Act, the court ordered that Hendricks be civilly committed.

Hendricks appealed the validity of his commitment to the Kansas Supreme Court and claimed that the state was unconstitutionally using ex post facto and double jeopardy law . The state court ruled that the Act was invalid on the grounds that the condition of "mental abnormality" did not satisfy the "substantive" due process requirement that involuntary civil commitment must be based on the finding of the presence of a "mental illness." It did not address the claims of ex post facto and of double jeopardy.

The United States Supreme Court granted Kansas certiorari.

== Decision ==
The Supreme Court ruled against Hendricks in a 5–4 decision. It agreed with the Act's procedures and the definition of a "mental abnormality" as a "congenital or acquired condition affecting the emotional or volitional capacity which predisposes the person to commit sexually violent offenses to the degree that such person is a menace to the health and safety of others." It agreed with Kansas that the Act limits persons eligible for confinement to persons who are not able to control their dangerousness.

Further, the Court decided the Act does not violate the Constitution's double jeopardy prohibition or the ban on ex post facto law because the Act does not establish criminal proceedings and so involuntary confinement under it is not punishment. Because the Act is civil, Hendricks' confinement under the Act is not a second prosecution or double jeopardy. Finally, the Court said the Act is not considered punitive if it fails to offer treatment for an untreatable condition.

== Reaction ==
Some commenters have observed that the decision could be interpreted to expand involuntary civil commitment for people with personality disorders to allow for the indefinite detention of large numbers of criminals:

"[T]he precommitment requirement of a 'mental abnormality' or 'personality disorder' is consistent with the requirements of ... other statutes that we have upheld in that it narrows the class of persons eligible for confinement to those who are unable to control their dangerousness."

== Subsequent developments ==
In the subsequent Kansas v. Crane (2002), this decision was upheld for an individual that suffered from exhibitionism and antisocial personality disorder.

== See also ==
- List of United States Supreme Court cases, volume 521
- List of United States Supreme Court cases
- Lists of United States Supreme Court cases by volume
- Smith v. Doe (2003)
- United States v. Comstock (2010)
