= Earl Kenneth Shriner =

American sex offender and child murderer

Earl Kenneth Shriner (born 1950) is an American criminal who in 1990 was convicted of attempted first degree murder, first degree rape and first degree assault of seven-year-old Ryan Alan Hade and sentenced to 131 years' imprisonment.

== Criminal record ==
Shriner, who was described by criminologist Michael Petrunik as "a slightly retarded man with a bizarre physical appearance", had a long history of sadistic sexual assaults but only one conviction. Petrunik explained, "Shriner was in the community without supervision because his sentence had expired and a judge had ruled that he did not meet the stringent 'imminent danger' criteria necessary for commitment under the State's mental health laws."

In 1966, 16-year-old Shriner was detained on suspicion of strangling a seven-year-old girl. He instead led police to the body of a developmentally disabled 15-year-old girl whom he had also strangled. He was sentenced to ten years but committed as a "defective delinquent" to a hospital and not convicted of a crime. Between 1977 and 1987, while serving a 10-year sentence for abducting and assaulting two 16-year-old girls, Shriner repeatedly disclosed fantasies and detailed plans of how he would kidnap, confine, and torture his victims.

== Reactions ==
=== Sexually violent predator legislation ===
In May 1989, Shriner committed his final sexual assault. The attack, in which Shriner raped and emasculated 7-year-old Ryan Alan Hade, caused widespread outrage and is one of the catalysts for the creation of laws allowing indefinite confinement of sex offenders. Outraged citizens formed victims' advocacy group the Tennis Shoe Brigade. The group, named for its demand that the public be free to walk the streets in safety, rallied for toughening the laws and pressured Washington governor Booth Gardner. The Washington state legislature unanimously enacted the first "sexual predator" law, allowing perpetrators of any sexual crime to be imprisoned indefinitely if experts attest they have a "mental abnormality" indicating high risk of future sex offenses. A pivotal part of the state's 1990 Community Protection Act, this legislation was adopted by many other U.S. states. Many were outraged that Shriner, a dangerous sexual predator, had been allowed to live in anonymity prior to the attack on Hade and some thought that it could have been avoided if locals had been aware of Shriner's criminal history. As a result, the Community Protection Act created the state's sex offender registry, the first of its kind available to the public, and required community notification of the presence of the state's most dangerous sex offenders.

=== Animal abuse ===
Shriner was also cited by PETA in their campaign against animal abuse as an example of notorious criminals that started torturing animals long before turning to children. The Animals' Voice describes him as "being widely known in his neighborhood as the man who put firecrackers in dogs' rectums and strung up cats".

== See also ==
- Special Commitment Center
- Sex offender registries in the United States
