= Pitt Passage =

Coordinates: 47°12′55.5″N 122°43′18.7″W

Pitt Passage is a strait, in the southern of part of Puget Sound in the U.S. state of Washington. Entirely within Pierce County, Pitt Passage separates Key Peninsula from McNeil Island. Pitt Island lies in the passage.

Pitt Passage was named Pit Passage by Charles Wilkes during the Wilkes Expedition of 1838–1842.
