= United States House Caucus on Missing and Exploited Children =

The House Caucus on Missing and Exploited Children (HCMEC) was formed in order to assist the National Center for Missing and Exploited Children (NCMEC) and coordinate United States federal legislation preventing child abduction and exploitation of children, including prosecution for possession of online pornography and solicitation of minors for sexual activity. According to statistics from the U.S. Department of Justice, of the estimated 24 million child Internet users, one in five children online is sexually solicited, yet only one in four of these tells a parent or guardian.

This caucus raises awareness the problem of missing children and works to prevent future abductions. The Caucus has initiated community, state, and national efforts to combat the growth of child abduction and exploitation throughout the country - like the Amber Alert, Code Adam, Know the Rules and other programs.

== History ==
As of 2006, the Caucus is led by co-chairman and Co-founder Bud Cramer, Democrat from Alabama's 5th congressional district. The Caucus was subsequently led by Nick Lampson upon his reelection in 2007. The Caucus was established by Nick Lampson, a member of Congress from Texas.

A vacancy for a Republican co-chairperson was created upon the resignation of Congressman Mark Foley (R-FL), on September 29, 2006. Foley had resigned at the beginning of a scandal alleging he had sent inappropriate emails and instant messages to former congressional pages.

== Legislation ==
H.R. 3132 The Sex Offender Registration and Notification Act of 2005 was legislation introduced by in the US House of Representatives, by Congressman Foley and co-sponsored by Rep. Cramer, in order to increase and tighten tracking of sex offenders and provide standards for notifying the public about these predators. This legislation advanced in several forms: H. Res. 436, H.R. 3133: Sex Offender Registration and Notification Act, H.R. 4472: Adam Walsh Child Protection and Safety Act of..., and H.R. 4905: Sex Offender Registration and Notification Act. HR 3132 received 88 cosponsors and was forwarded to the Senate on September 15, 2005, where it became S1086.

The bill eventually became law as the Adam Walsh Child Protection and Safety Act of 2006, and was signed July 27, 2006 by President George W. Bush on the 25th anniversary of Adam Walsh's death.

== See also ==
- Senate Caucus on Missing, Exploited and Runaway Children (SCMERC)
- John Walsh
- Patty Wetterling
- Sex offender registries in the United States
