= Nectow v. City of Cambridge =

Coordinates: 42.35553°N 71.10967°W

- Supreme Court of the United States

Argued April 19, 1928 Decided May 14, 1928
- Full case name: Nectow v. City of Cambridge
- Citations: 277 U.S. 183 (more) 48 S. Ct. 447; 72 L. Ed. 842

Case history
- Prior: Appeal from Supreme Judicial Court of Massachusetts

Holding
- The governmental power to interfere by zoning regulations with the general rights of the land owner by restricting the character of his use cannot be imposed if it does not bear a substantial relation to the public health, safety, morals, or general welfare.

Court membership
- Chief Justice William H. Taft Associate Justices Oliver W. Holmes Jr. · Willis Van Devanter; James C. McReynolds · Louis Brandeis; George Sutherland · Pierce Butler; Edward T. Sanford · Harlan F. Stone

Case opinion
- Majority: Sutherland, joined by unanimous

Laws applied
- U.S. Const. amend. XIV

Nectow v. City of Cambridge, 277 U.S. 183 (1928), was a United States Supreme Court case regarding the practice of zoning and its effects on property rights.

The Supreme Court reversed a Massachusetts Supreme Judicial Court ruling and found the invasion of the plaintiff's property rights were "serious and highly injurious," by a new city zoning ordinance, and that the placement of the locus of the zoning ordinance would not promote the health, safety, convenience or general welfare of inhabitants. Nectow v. City of Cambridge, along with Euclid v. Ambler, was an early and influential case regarding the relatively new practice of zoning, and constituted the Supreme Court's case law on zoning until 1974.

== Facts ==
In 1860, Alvan Clark & Sons purchased a tract of land in Cambridge, Massachusetts, on which they built a telescope lens manufacturing plant and two family homes. Cambridge, like other American cities at the time, did not have a zoning code restricting economic activity to specific districts, allowing the Clarks to put residential and industrial facilities in the same tract. To Clark family homes lined the western side of the residential district of Cambridgeport. To the south, the Ford Motor Company built the Cambridge Assembly plant in 1913. During the Clarks' tenure, the lens factory was one of many small-scale industrial businesses in Cambridgeport.

In 1920, Saul Nectow purchased the entire 140,000-square-foot (3.2-acre) tract. Nectow had no specific plan for the site, but intended to resell the property to a new industrial enterprise for redevelopment. In 1921 and 1925, he demolished the Clark houses in anticipation of redevelopment.

The City of Cambridge established its first zoning ordinance in 1924. The new ordinance restricted the Nectow property, occupied by the Clark family homesteads, to residential uses. A purchaser had agreed to buy the entire tract from Nectow, but withdrew the offer when the new zoning encumbered the residential portion of the tract. Nectow sued to enjoin the city for a regulatory taking that reduced the value of his property.
