= Ryan Alan Hade =

American sexual assault victim

Ryan Alan Hade (c. August 21, 1981 – June 9, 2005) was an American sexual assault victim from Tacoma, Washington. On May 20, 1989, he was raped, emasculated, stabbed and left for dead in a vacant lot. Earl Kenneth Shriner was convicted of the attack and sentenced to 131 years in prison. Shriner had a long history of sexual assault charges spanning 25 years. The case has been cited as one of the catalysts for new US laws allowing indefinite confinement of sex offenders. Hade, who survived the attack by Shriner, died in a vehicular accident. The vacant lot where Hade was attacked was later turned into a park and was renamed Ryan's Park after his death.
