= National Sex Offender Registry =

Canadian legal data base

The National Sex Offender Registry (NSOR) is a Canadian legal data base designed to monitor convicted sex offenders living in the country. It came into force on December 15, 2004, with the passing of the Sex Offender Information Registration Act (SOIR Act) Significant amendments to the original legislation came into force in September 2008, and on April 15, 2011. Access is limited to law officials and not available to the general public.

Any offender who is convicted of a primary designated sexual offence (e.g. sexual assault, sexual interference, possession of child pornography, etc.) will be ordered by the court, at the time of sentencing or within 90 days thereafter, to register with the registration site that serves the area of their main residence. A person so ordered must register within 7 days, or if they are incarcerated for their crime, within 7 days from their release date. The information that is collected from the offender is confidential, and is not available to the public.

The main purpose of Canada's NSOR is to assist a police officer who is investigating, or to help prevent, a crime of a sexual nature. NSOR analysts can provide the most current information available about a suspect who is already a registered sex offender, or can search the NSOR database for possible suspects in sexual offence cases where the offender is unknown.

The NSOR database also contains details concerning many sex offenders who were convicted and sentenced prior to December 15, 2004, referred to as "retrospective" offenders. The criteria for this group was that they must have still been serving an active portion of their sentence on the date that the SOIR Act came into force (i.e. still incarcerated) on probation, or on parole. These retrospective offenders were tracked down by various law enforcement authorities, and were served with a Notice that they were required to register for the NSOR after a one-year grace period. The last day of that grace period was December 15, 2005.

Anyone required to register with Canada's National Sex Offender Registry is required to comply with the following obligations:

1. to register with their registration site once a year. The registration site is usually the police agency that serves the area where the offender's main residence is located, although this description varies somewhat by province or territory;
2. to advise their registration site, within 7 days, of any change of name;
3. to advise their registration site, within 7 days, of any change of address or change of employment;
4. to advise their registration site, within 7 days, of any absence from their main address that will be for at least 7 consecutive days. They must advise of their date of departure, their actual or estimated date of return, and of the address(es) where they will be while absent. In addition, the offender is required to advise the registration site, within 7 days of their return to their residence, of their actual date of return.

An Order or Notice requires an offender to comply with the SOIR Act for a term of either 10 years, 20 years, or life. The term is determined by the maximum possible penalty the offender could have received for the offence for which he/she was sentenced. Also, if the offender has a previous conviction for any sexual offence (it does not have to be the same sexual offence for which they're now being sentenced), or if they are convicted of more than one primary designated offence, or if they're already under a previously-issued Order or Notice, the minimum term that will apply is life.

Since April 15, 2011, individuals who return to Canada and who have been convicted of a sexual offence outside of the country, must report this fact within 7 days to the nearest police force. Depending on the nature of the offence, they may receive notice that their name will be added to the NSOR, and that they will be required to comply with the same reporting obligations under the SOIR Act.
