= Special Commitment Center =

Commitment center for sex offenders in Washington, US

Coordinates: 47.2143°N 122.6865°W

The Special Commitment Center (SCC) in the US state of Washington is a post-prison-sentence treatment institution for people designated as sexually violent predators, located on McNeil Island.

Civil commitment is the subject of controversy because it allows the involuntary civil confinement of a sex offender after the court's sentence has been fulfilled.

== History ==
Washington State's 1990 Community Protection Act was meant to address limitations in involuntary-commitment law and institutions by allowing indefinite, involuntary civil commitment of violent sexual offenders who meet specified criteria. The previous system managed only short-term treatment of persons with serious mental disorders—with the intent of quickly returning them to the community. The Act uniquely applies to violent sexual offenders who meet the less stringent criteria of a personality disorder or mental abnormality which is believed to make them likely to offend again. Under this law, "sexually violent predators" are defined as people with a history of sexually violent crime and "personality disorders and/or mental abnormalities which are unamenable to existing mental illness treatment modalities and those conditions render them likely to engage in sexually violent behavior", targeting strangers, or establishing relationships specifically for the purpose of victimization, if released into the community. "Mental abnormalities" and "personality disorders" typically refer to DSM-IV diagnoses, which are established through structured interviews with the subject.

The Special Commitment Center was established in April 1990 to manage those committed under the Act. In the beginning, the SCC managed only six people; that number grew at a rate of about 22 persons per year. In late 2001, a temporary Secure Community Transition Facility (SCTF) was established in order to comply with legislation that allowed court-ordered conditional releases. In 2003, SCTF was moved to its present permanent location in the North Complex on McNeil Island. In May 2004, in the same complex, the SCC opened a dedicated facility known as the Total Confinement Facility to house confined residents.

== Controversy ==
In 2001, the Washington State Supreme Court ruled that the rights of two residents were violated because during their commitment proceedings they were not allowed to present evidence that a less restrictive treatment alternative would have been more effective than total confinement. Since the decision, several residents in total confinement were allowed to move to private residences or halfway houses.

Residents of the Special Commitment Center receive $1 to $3 per hour for work performed while in the program. A lawsuit has been filed by one of the inmates contesting that—because the Special Commitment Center is a civil treatment program and not a prison—residents should be guaranteed minimum wage under federal law.

== Commitment process ==
Washington State law requires an End of Sentence Review Committee to review every sex offender before release from prison. The committee, chaired by the Department of Corrections, rates an offender on a scale from 1 to 3 according to their likelihood of re-offending. The rating sets the level of supervision that a person requires after release.

If the committee finds that a person meets the legal definition of "sexually violent predator," they refer their case to the Special Commitment Center. The prosecutor's office of the convicting county receives permission to petition for the person's commitment to the center. The SCC houses the person until a judge holds a probable cause hearing. If the judge finds probable cause, the SCC confines the person indefinitely. Otherwise, they are released.

After civil commitment, a person has the right to an annual progress review by the court. A conditional release is granted only if the court finds it to be in the best interests of the person, and conditions can be imposed to adequately protect the community. To be released, a person must be put under the care of a treatment provider that will provide regular updates to the court, and be placed in housing under conditions that allow authorities to be notified if they leave without authorization.

== Facilities ==
=== Total Confinement Facility ===
Located on McNeil Island, North Complex. Houses residents restricted to total confinement. The facility has beds for 228 men and 4 women. An adjacent building contains 80 beds for low-maintenance residents. There are plans to increase capacity to 398 beds.

=== Secure Community Transition Facility in Pierce County ===
Located on McNeil Island, North Complex. Houses residents who have received court-ordered conditional releases. Contains 24 beds.

=== Secure Community Transition Facility in King County ===
Located in South Seattle. Houses residents who have received court-ordered conditional releases. Contains 12 beds.

== Lawsuits by residents ==
In September 2017, about 200 residents filed a lawsuit concerning the quality of the water at the McNeil Island facility; they had not been provided with bottled water. The lawsuit alleged that their water (tap water), often cloudy and brown, was contaminated with fecal matter and chemicals, caused stomach pain and skin rashes (from showering), and had been blamed for unexplained deaths.

However, testing done on the water showed that it passed all quality standards required by the State of Washington. Residents are given bottled water with each meal.

== See also ==
- Jimmy Ryce Involuntary Civil Commitment for Sexually Violent Predators' Treatment And Care Act
