= Pitt Island (Washington) =

Coordinates: 47°13′23″N 122°42′56″W

Pitt Island is a small island astride Pitt Passage in Puget Sound, located in Pierce County, Washington, United States.
