= Sexually violent predator laws =

US state laws that confine dangerous sex offenders for public protection

Some jurisdictions may commit certain types of dangerous sex offenders to state-run detention facilities following the completion of their sentence if that person has a "mental abnormality" or personality disorder that makes the person likely to engage in sexual offenses if not confined in a secure facility. In the United States, twenty states, the federal government, and the District of Columbia have a version of these commitment laws, which are referred to as "Sexually Violent Predator" (SVP) or "Sexually Dangerous Persons" laws.

Generally speaking, SVP laws have three elements: that the person has been convicted of a sexually violent offense (a term that is defined in applicable statutes), that the person has a mental abnormality and/or personality disorder, which causes their serious difficulty controlling their sexually violent behavior, and that this mental abnormality and/or personality disorder makes the person likely to engage in predatory acts of sexual violence if not confined in a secure facility.

A "mental abnormality" is a legal term that is not identical to a mental disorder, though experts generally refer to diagnoses contained in the Diagnostic and Statistical Manual of Mental Disorders (DSM) as evidence of a mental abnormality.

In most cases, commitment as an SVP is indefinite; however, once a person is committed, the confining agency is constitutionally required to conduct periodic reviews of that person's mental condition. If the committed person's condition changes enough to no longer meet the commitment criteria, they must be released. In some circumstances, committed persons can be released to court-monitored conditional releases to less restrictive alternative placements (LRAs).

== History ==
In 1990, the first SVP law was established in the state of Washington, following two high-profile sexual assaults and murders by Earl Kenneth Shriner and Gene Kane. In response to the attacks, Helen Harlow—the mother of Earl Shriner's victim—formed a group known as The Tennis Shoe Brigade in order to pressure the state government to change the laws related to sex offenders. Washington Governor Booth Gardner formed the Task Force on Community Protection to consider possible solutions.

While the Task Force deliberated, serial killer Westley Allan Dodd kidnapped, raped, and murdered three young boys in Vancouver, Washington, for which he was executed by hanging. The state legislature, following the recommendation of the Task Force, enacted the Community Protection Act of 1990.

The United States Supreme Court declared the "civil commitment" of former sex offenders was "civil" and non-punitive as the high court's justices presumed as true the state's empirical claim that it had a means of identifying a class of individuals, labeled by the state "sexually violent predators", who were "extremely dangerous" due to their "likelihood of engaging in repeat acts of predatory sexual violence [being] high" (Kansas v. Hendricks (1997) 521 U.S. 346, 351).

In order for the imprisoning of these individuals, without new crimes having been committed, the U.S. Supreme Court indicated that states must be able to make a distinction, between (i) the class of sex offenders who must be released after having completed their prison sentences and (ii) those who could be "civilly" detained, as this later class (unlike the former) is made up of individuals who suffered from "mental abnormalities" which caused them to have "serious difficulty in controlling behavior", thus making them distinguishable "from the dangerous but typical recidivist" that must be released (Kansas v. Crane (2002) 534 U.S. 407, 413).

Data culled over the several years these schemes have been in place have systematically demonstrated that "Sexually Violent Predator" laws were imprisoning individuals who had not been rationally differentiated from typical recidivists or from individuals who were among the overwhelming majority of former sex offenders who would not ever reoffend. ("Do Sexually Violent Predator Laws Violate Double Jeopardy or Substantive Due Process? An Empirical Inquiry", Prof. Tama Rice Lave, Brooklyn Law Review, 2013) One federal court judge surmised in 2015 that Minnesota's Sexually Violent Predator law seemed to be one not directed at any legitimate governmental purpose; rather it seemed to be designed to punish a politically unpopular class of individuals not constitutionally subject to punishment (Karsjens, et al. v. Minnesota Department of Human Services, et al., United States District Court, District of Minnesota, Case No. 11-3659 (DFW/JJK))?

As of 2010, 20 states and the District of Columbia have enacted laws similar to Washington's. The Federal Government established its sex offender commitment process when it passed the Adam Walsh Child Protection and Safety Act.

== Civil confinement ==
Civil confinement is the formal legal process by which persons convicted of certain sexual offenses (generally violent sex offenders) may be subject to involuntary commitment upon completion of a prison sentence, and is a potential penalty of sexually violent predator laws.

=== Process ===
Although the exact details of the legal process may vary from state to state, the United States Supreme Court reviewed and upheld as constitutional a statutory process adopted in Kansas. See Kansas v. Hendricks, 521 U.S. 346 (1997). There, civil confinement proceedings could be initiated against "any person who has been convicted of or charged with a sexually violent offense and who suffers from a mental abnormality or personality disorder which makes the person likely to engage in the predatory acts of sexual violence." Many of those terms were themselves defined in the statute, including "mental abnormality," defined as "congenital or acquired condition affecting the emotional or volitional capacity which predisposes the person to commit sexually violent offenses in a degree constituting such person a menace to the health and safety of others." See Kansas v. Hendricks, 521 U.S. 346 (1997).

If a prison identified an inmate who was about to be released but potentially fit this definition, the prison authorities were required to notify the local prosecutor of the impending release. The prosecutor was then required to decide whether to petition for commitment. The court would then have to determine whether probable cause existed to support the inmate's status as a "sexually violent predator," and, upon such a determination, order the inmate to be psychologically evaluated. The psychological evaluation would then form the basis of a further trial to determine whether the inmate qualified as a violent sexual predator. Upon such a determination, the inmate would be subject to involuntary commitment at a medical facility until such time as his mental abnormality had changed and it was safe to release him. See Kansas v. Hendricks, 521 U.S. 346, 353 (1997). The court would then be required to conduct an annual review of the determination, and the inmate would always be allowed to petition for freedom under the same standards.

The Supreme Court concluded that this process met previously established standards of constitutional substantive due process governing voluntary confinement, did not constitute double jeopardy because the proceedings were civil rather than criminal, and was not an ex post facto law for the same reason. Id. at 353–371. In a following case, the United States Supreme Court clarified that the government must demonstrate that the inmate has at least a serious lack of ability to control his behavior. Kansas v. Crane 534 U.S. 407 (2002). The Supreme Court has also determined that Congress has the authority to pass a similar law affecting federal prisoners. United States v. Comstock, 560 U.S. 126 (2010).

Twenty states have civil commitment facilities, as of 2018.

== Controversy ==
As with civil commitment generally, civil confinement is a controversial implementation of state power. Detractors point to the prospect of indefinite detention without due process of law. Proponents cite public safety.

State legislatures who have decided to adopt civil confinement statutes have expressed the intent of the laws in their enactments. One example is the State of Washington, which explained:

The legislature finds that a small but extremely dangerous group of sexually violent predators exist who do not have a mental disease or defect that renders them appropriate for the existing involuntary treatment act . . . which is intended to be a short-term civil commitment system that is primarily designed to provide short-term treatment to individuals with serious mental disorders and then return them to the community. In contrast to persons appropriate for civil commitment . . . sexually violent predators generally have personality disorders and/or mental abnormalities which are unamenable to existing mental illness treatment modalities and those conditions render them likely to engage in sexually violent behavior. The legislature further finds that sex offenders' likelihood of engaging in repeat acts of predatory sexual violence is high. The existing involuntary commitment act . . . is inadequate to address the risk to reoffend because during confinement these offenders do not have access to potential victims and therefore they will not engage in an overt act during confinement as required by the involuntary treatment act for continued confinement. The legislature further finds that the prognosis for curing sexually violent offenders is poor, the treatment needs of this population are very long term, and the treatment modalities for this population are very different than the traditional treatment modalities for people appropriate for commitment under the involuntary treatment act.

== Legal challenges ==
In 1997, the U.S. Supreme Court upheld the constitutionality of SVP laws in Kansas v. Hendricks. In doing so, the United States Supreme Court declared the "civil commitment" of former sex offenders was "civil" and non-punitive as the High Court's justices presumed as true the state's empirical claim that it had a means of identifying a class of individuals—those to whom the state referred as "sexually violent predators"—who were "extremely dangerous" due to their "likelihood of engaging in repeat acts of predatory sexual violence [being] high." (Kansas v. Hendricks (1997) 521 U.S. 346, 351)

In the High Court's analysis of whether the scheme served the traditionally punitive role of deterrence, the court further empirically assumed the targeted class of individuals could not be deterred – thus severe volitional impairment was required. (Kansas v. Hendricks (1997) 521 U.S. 346, 362–363) The High Court was confident that "the confinement's duration [was] linked to the stated purposed of the commitment, namely, to hold the person until his mental abnormality no longer causes him to be a threat to others." (Kansas v. Hendricks (1997) 521 U.S. 346, 363) The distinction, between (i) the class of sex offenders who must be released after having completed their prison sentences and (ii) those who could be "civilly" detained, was believed to have been that the later class was made up of individuals who suffered from mental abnormalities which caused them to have "serious difficulty in controlling behavior", thus making them distinguishable "from the dangerous but typical recidivist" that must be released. (Kansas v. Crane (2002) 534 U.S. 407, 413)

In both Hendricks and Crane the state was given deferential preference in asserting its factual findings regarding this so-called "sexually violent predator" class which it claimed was identifiable and distinguishable, as noted above, from recidivists who may be dangerous, but who were not subject to severe volitional impairment problems caused as a result of their mental abnormality. Recent data has indicated that the High Court's faith in the state's factual findings was misplaced. Data indicates that the states that have implemented sexually violent predator laws have failed to distinguish between those who truly have mental abnormalities that cause them to have severe volitional impairment likely to lead to reoffending from both the typical recidivist as well as the overwhelming majority of former sex offenders who will never reoffend.

== See also ==
- California Proposition 83 (2006)
- Category:Civil commitment of sex offenders
- Imprisonment for public protection (England and Wales)
- Preventive detention
- Recidivism
- Sex offender
- Sex offender registry
  - Sex offender registries in the United States
- Sexual predator
- Smith v. Doe
- United States v. Comstock
