= McNeil Island =

Island in Washington State, US

Coordinates: 47.215°N 122.69°W

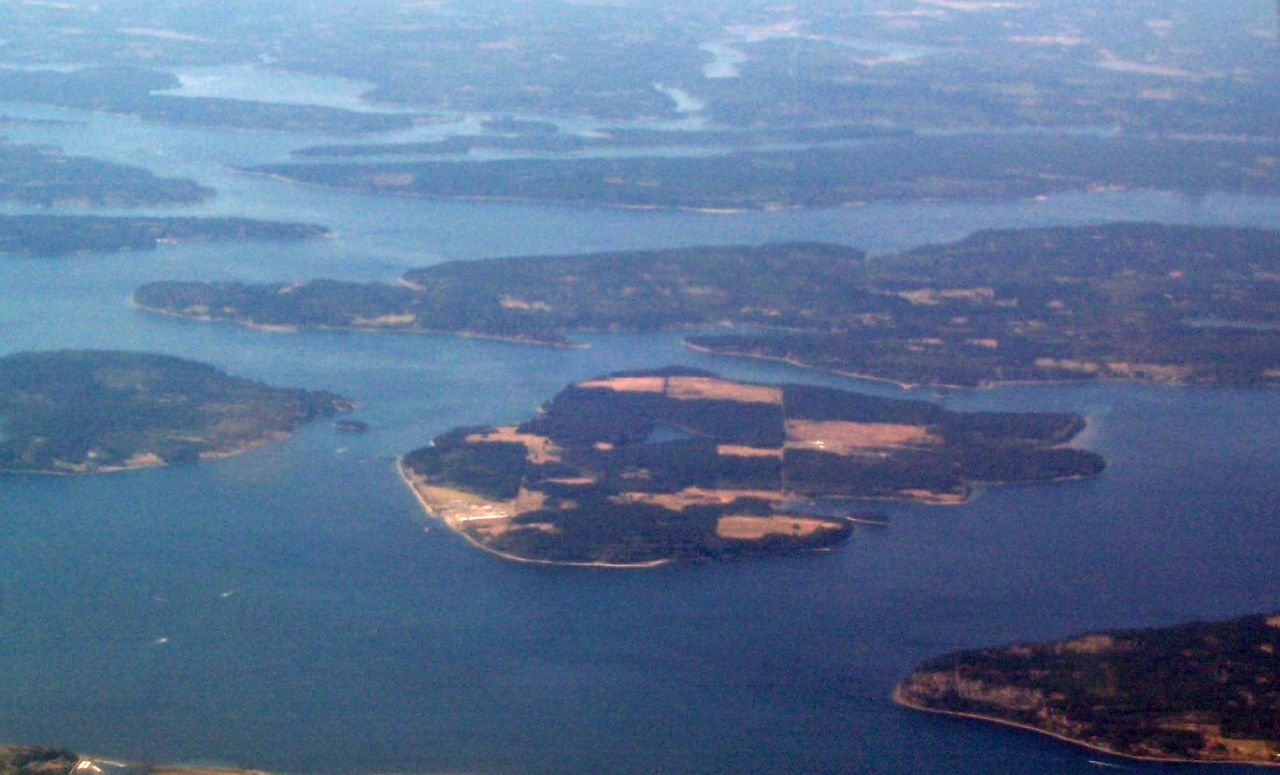
- Aerial image of McNeil Island (foreground) seen from the east

- Location within Washington (state) Location within the United States

Geography
- Location: Puget Sound

Administration
- United States
- State: Washington
- County: Pierce County

McNeil Island is an island in the Northwestern United States, in south Puget Sound southwest of Tacoma, Washington. With a land area of 6.63 square miles (17.2 km^{2}), it lies in an area of many inhabited small islands, including Anderson Island to the south across Balch Passage, and Fox Island to the north across Carr Inlet. To the west, McNeil Island is separated from Key Peninsula by Pitt Passage. The Washington mainland lies to the east, across the south basin of Puget Sound.

The island has been owned and administered by the government of the state of Washington since early 1840s when it was seized from the aboriginal Steilacoom people; it was the location of a federal penitentiary for over a century, from 1875 to 1981. It was turned over to the Washington State Department of Corrections and became the McNeil Island Corrections Center, until it closed in 2011. It was the last remaining island prison in the country to be accessible only by air and sea. (Note: Rikers Island in New York City is a jail (short-term holding facility run by the city) and not a prison (long-term holding facility run by the state). The Rikers Island Bridge opened in 1966.)

In November 2010, the state announced closure plans for 2011, saving $14 million. A detention center for violent sexual offenders remains on the island.

The McNeil Island Historical Society was chartered in 2010 shortly after the closing of the prison for the purpose of educating the public about, and preserving the rich history of, McNeil Island.

== History ==
The island was part of the territory of the Steilacoom people, a Coast Salish tribe.

It was named in 1841 by Charles Wilkes in honor of Captain William Henry McNeill of the Hudson's Bay Company, who greeted Wilkes upon the arrival of the United States Exploring Expedition at Fort Nisqually in southern Puget Sound. Wilkes’ misspelling was never corrected.

The Robert A. Inskip expedition of 1846 named the island Duntze, after Captain John A. Duntze of the Royal Navy. In 1847, during the British map reorganization project, Henry Kellett restored the earlier name McNeil.

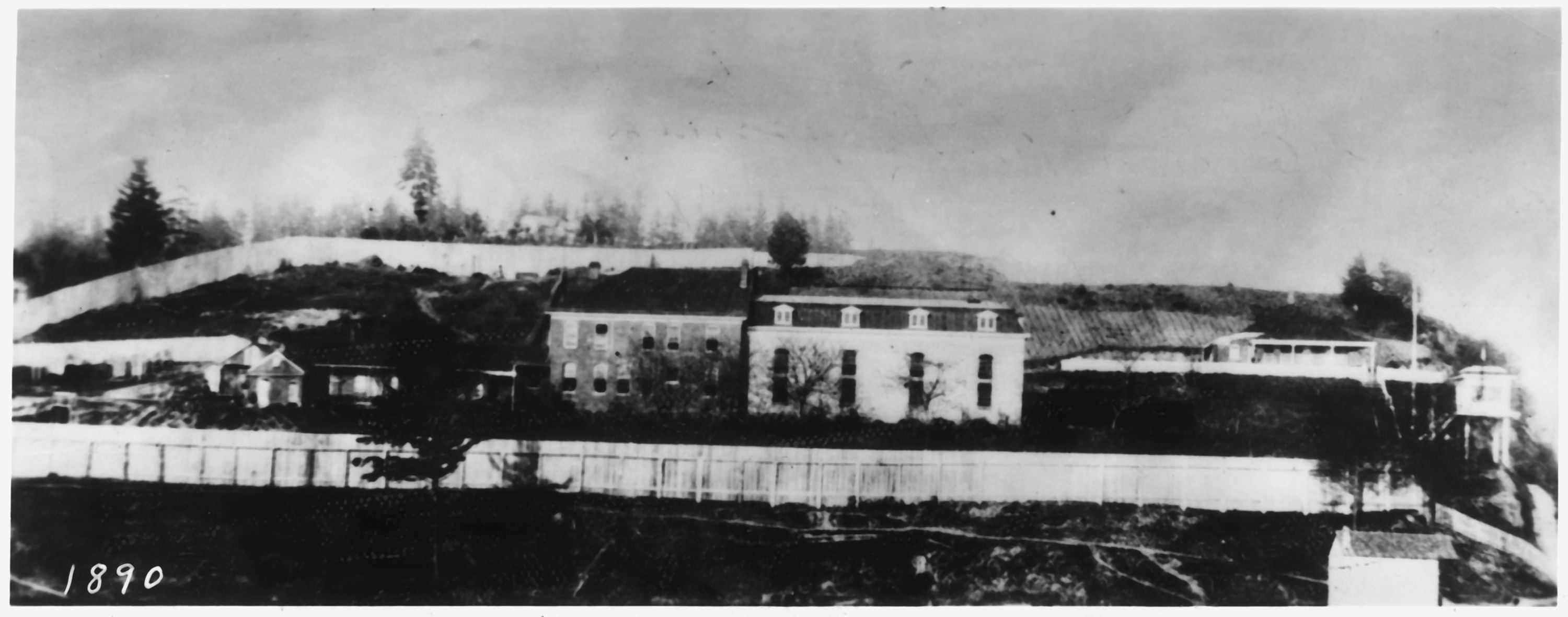
McNeil Island Prison c. 1890

The U.S. government bought land on McNeil Island in 1870 and opened a federal penitentiary there in 1875. The federal government accumulated parcels of land adjacent to the penitentiary, and by 1937, it had purchased all the land on the island and compelled its last residents to leave.

The federal penitentiary's most famous inmates were probably Robert Stroud, the "Birdman of Alcatraz", who was held there from 1909 to 1912; Charles Manson, who before inspiring Helter Skelter in killing Sharon Tate and others in 1969, was an inmate from 1961 to 1966 for trying to cash a forged government check; and Alvin Karpis, who was transferred to McNeil Island in 1962, from Alcatraz as a result of its impending closure, to complete his sentence. Karpis, who was labeled the FBI's Public Enemy #1 at the time of his capture in 1936, was the point man for the Barker–Karpis gang that committed kidnappings and numerous bank robberies while operating throughout the Midwest in the early 1930s. Northwest bootlegger Roy Olmstead was also an inmate for four years until his release on May 12, 1931.

During World War II, eighty-five Japanese Americans who had resisted the draft to protest their wartime confinement, including civil rights activist Gordon Hirabayashi, were sentenced to prison terms at McNeil; all were pardoned by President Harry S. Truman in 1947.

The state of Washington acquired the penitentiary from the federal government in 1981. It was called McNeil Island Corrections Center (MICC) until 2011, when it became the Special Commitment Center for violent sexual criminals.

A post office called Bee was established in 1895 and remained in operation until 1919. Local beekeeping operations caused the name to be selected.

A post office called Gertrude was established on the island in 1900 and remained in operation until 1936. The community takes its name from nearby Gertrude Island.

A video posted to YouTube channel Vagrant Holiday in 2020 shows him exploring the island along with commentary.

=== McNeil Island Cemetery and Prison ===
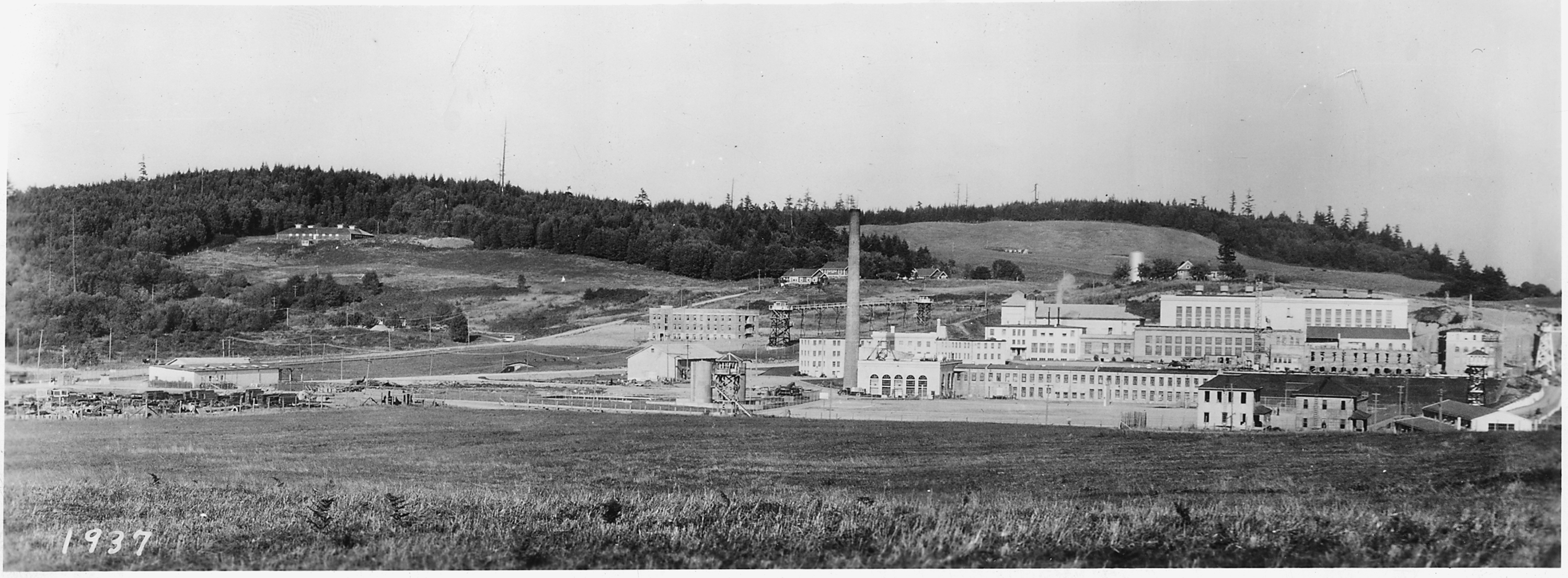
McNeil Island Penitentiary in 1937

Land for the McNeil Island Cemetery was donated by island pioneers, Eric Nyberg and his wife Martha. The first of many burials was in October 1905. When the island's residents were forced to leave in 1936, the cemetery was closed; all remains were exhumed and reburied in cemeteries on the mainland.

At the time of its closing, McNeil was the only prison left in North America that was accessible only by boat or air. It remains the site of the state's primary Special Commitment Center (SCC), where sexually violent predators are indefinitely committed for treatment after completing their standard prison sentences. In addition to the main building that held the majority of inmates, an annex on the opposite side of the island housed low-risk inmates, and those who were scheduled for release. During the 1800s, it was once a military encampment as well as a military prison for a short time. At one point, the prison was almost self-sustaining in terms of agricultural products, including its dairy farm; all these elements were manned and operated by the inmates.

McNeil was long threatened with closing due to the high cost of operating the prison; an announcement in late 2010 said the prison would close in 2011. The prison's remaining 500 low-risk inmates were integrated into other state prisons. The prison officially closed on April 1, 2011.

== Population ==
As of October 2018 the population was 214, all civilly committed former prison inmates.

While the prison was operational, the island had a population well over a thousand residents (1,516 as of the 2000 census), the majority of which were incarcerated in MICC prison. There were about 100 non-prisoners living on the island composing about 40 families, each with at least one family member employed at MICC. The homes were subsidized by the DOC at a greatly reduced rent.

== Transportation ==
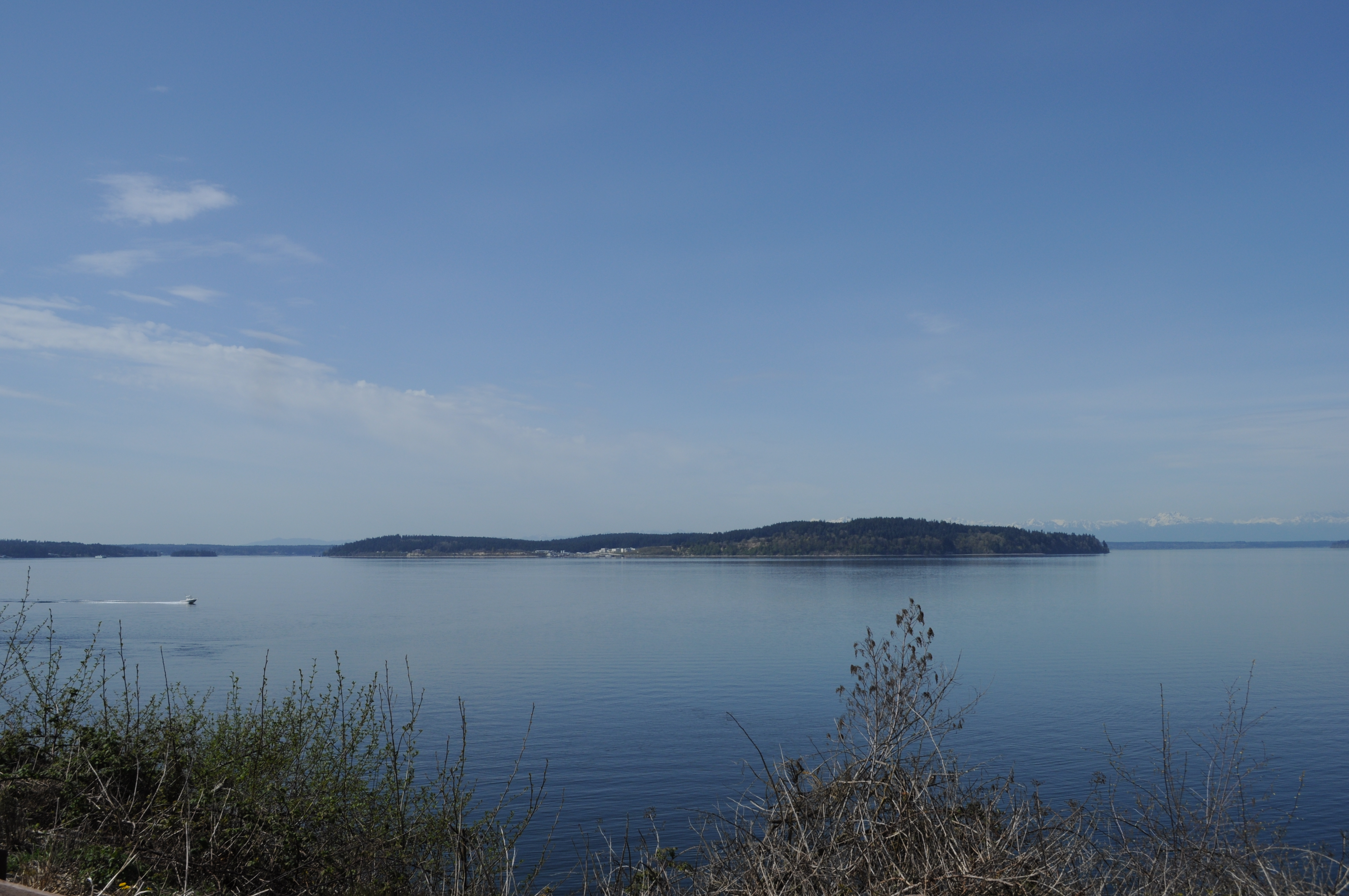
McNeil Island from Steilacoom

A small passenger-only ferry was for registered visitors, departing Steilacoom Dock every two hours. The state also supplies emergency speed-boat services for the civilly committed.

In 1934, McNeil Island was linked by ferry service with Steilacoom, Anderson Island and Longbranch, Washington. Separate federal or state-owned ferries under the prison administration connected McNeil Island with Steilacoom. The Washington State Department of Corrections continues to operate passenger ferry and barge service to McNeil Island to service DSHS's Special Commitment Center.

== In popular culture ==
- In Tom Robbins' 1980 novel Still Life With Woodpecker, the perspective character Bernard Mickey Wrangle was sentenced to the penitentiary on McNeil Island for blowing up the chemistry department of a university in Madison, Wisconsin.
- In the 1995 Michael Mann movie Heat, Robert De Niro's character is revealed to have spent time as a prisoner at McNeil Island.
- In the movie Three Fugitives, Nick Nolte's character (Lucas) is released from McNeil Island prison at the beginning of the film.
- In the ninth episode of the first season of the podcast Tanis, the editor talks about Charles Manson's trip to the prison.
