= Roy Olmstead =

American bootlegger (1886–1966)

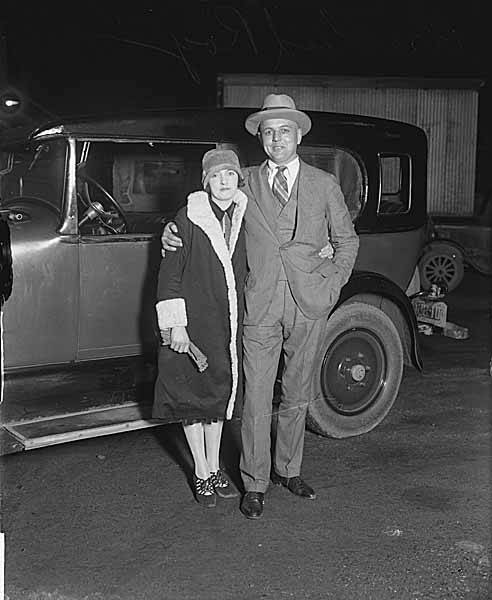
- Roy Olmstead with wife Elise, 1925
- Born: September 18, 1886; Beaver City, Nebraska, US
- Died: April 30, 1966 (aged 79); Seattle, Washington, US
- Occupations: Policeman, then bootlegger
- Status: Served term, later Pardoned
- Allegiance: King County Bootleggers
- Motive: Money making business of supplying the Pacific Northwest with good liquor
- Conviction: February 20, 1926 (age 39)
- Criminal charges: Violating the National Prohibition Act and for conspiracy
- Penalty: 4 years hard labor; $8000 fine

Roy Olmstead (September 18, 1886 – April 30, 1966) was an American bootlegger who operated in the Pacific Northwest during the American Prohibition era. A former lieutenant in the Seattle Police Department, he initiated alcohol smuggling of Canadian whiskey from Vancouver by boats through the Puget Sound to trucks in Washington while still serving in the department. After his arrest for this offense, he was dismissed from law enforcement and pursued the illegal importation and distribution of alcohol as a full-time and lucrative endeavor. He later set up a sober living out of his home in Seattle. Eventually, the first case of wiretapping in American history of his phones provided sufficient evidence for his arrest and prosecution, despite an appeal that reached the Supreme Court regarding the legality of the wiretap.

== Biography ==
=== Early life ===
Born in 1886 to farmers John and Sarah Olmstead, in Beaver City, Nebraska, Roy moved to Seattle, Washington, in 1904. Working in the Moran Brothers Co. shipyard before joining the Seattle Police Department on May 16, 1907, he was promoted to sergeant on April 5, 1910. His brothers Frank and Ralph were also on the Seattle force. Seattle police chief Joe Warren (1858–1934) was impressed with Sgt. Olmstead's intelligence and professionalism; appointing him Acting Lieutenant in 1917, with the promotion made permanent on January 22, 1919.

=== Bootlegging operations ===
When Washington State prohibited the manufacturing and selling of alcohol in 1916, the police force began raiding bootleg operations. Olmstead, noting the potential for profit, began his own bootlegging operation while still a policeman. On March 22, 1920, Olmstead was identified driving around a roadblock set by Prohibition Bureau agents raiding a rum-running operation. He was fired from the force and paid a fine of $500, but now could devote his full attention to his smuggling operations.

He ran his illegal operation like a business and before long he became one of the largest employers in Puget Sound. Known on the West Coast as "the Good Bootlegger", Olmstead did not engage in the practice of diluting his contraband with toxic industrial grade chemicals in order to increase his profits, selling only bonded liquor imported from Canada. To most other bootleggers, smuggling alcohol was but one facet of their criminal organization, and many were involved in prostitution, gambling, gun-running, and narcotics trafficking. Olmstead did not engage in these activities, and many did not regard him as a "true criminal" as a result. Despite the risks involved in rum-running, Olmstead did not allow his employees to carry firearms, telling his men he would rather lose a shipment of liquor than a life.

In August 1924, after his divorce from his first wife Caliste Viola Cottle came through, Olmstead married Elise Caroline Parché (aka Campbell), a Londoner who had worked for British Intelligence during World War I.

=== KFQX radio ===
In early October 1924, Roy and Elise Olmstead started radio station KFQX, with the assistance of inventor Al Hubbard. Studios were built in the Smith Tower, but were seldom used. For the most part, Elise ran the station. Typical of stations of the time, it had a variety format. The most popular program was "Aunt Vivian," where Mrs. Olmstead as "Aunt Vivian" read bedtime stories for children, beginning at 7:15 at night. This led to a popular legend that Elise inserted coded language into her stories as signals for her husband's bootlegging network, for example pick up and drop-off locations. Elise was broadcasting from her home as usual on November 17, 1924, when the home was raided by government agents and KFQX was put off the air.

After the raid, the station was leased to Birt Fisher, who changed the call letters to KTCL. After Olmstead's liquor trial ended, he sold the station to Vincent Kraft who changed the call sign to KXA and moved the frequency from 570 to 770. The radio station later became an ABC affiliate.

=== Olmstead v. United States ===
Largely on the basis of evidence obtained through police wiretapping of his telephone, Olmstead was arrested and tried for conspiracy to violate the National Prohibition Act. A Federal grand jury returned a two-count indictment against Roy Olmstead and 89 other defendants on January 19, 1925, with the trial ending on February 20, 1926, with the conviction of 21 defendants including Roy Olmstead and his attorney, Jerry Finch. Olmstead was sentenced to four years with hard labor and fined $8,000; Finch receiving a sentence of two years and a fine of $500. Other defendants' sentences ranged from 15 months to three years, with fines; defendants who cooperated and testified for the government, received one-year sentences. Olmstead appealed his case, arguing that the incriminating wiretapping evidence, which had been obtained without a warrant, constituted a violation of his constitutional rights to privacy and against self-incrimination. However, in February 1928 the Supreme Court upheld the conviction in the landmark case of Olmstead v. United States.

=== Prison and later life ===
Olmstead spent his four-year prison sentence at the McNeil Island Correctional Institute, and was released on May 12, 1931, with the Seattle Post-Intelligencer reporting: "He got the usual time off for good behavior, but aside from this, he served his full term plus thirty days for the $8,000 fine assessed against him." He moved back to Seattle to be with his wife and daughter, Patricia (aka Patsy), where he worked as an insecticides salesman and fumigator. On December 25, 1935, President Franklin D. Roosevelt granted him a full presidential pardon. Besides restoring his constitutional rights, the pardon remitted $100,000 the IRS claimed he owed in unpaid liquor taxes.

While in prison, Olmstead became a Christian Science practitioner and a carpenter, later working with prison inmates in the Puget Sound area on an anti-alcoholism agenda. He was a vibrant and active community member for his remaining years, teaching Sunday school and visiting prisoners in the King County Jail every Monday morning. Olmstead and his wife separated in 1940, citing personal and religious differences, and they divorced in 1943. Roy Olmstead died April 30, 1966, at the age of 79.

== See also ==
- List of people pardoned or granted clemency by the president of the United States
