= Senate Caucus on Missing, Exploited and Runaway Children =

The Senate Caucus on Missing, Exploited and Runaway Children (SCMERC) was formed in the United States of America in April, 2003, in order to assist the National Center for Missing and Exploited Children (NCMEC). It coordinates federal legislation preventing child abduction and exploitation of children, including prosecution for possession of online pornography, solicitation of minors for sexual activity, and a federal approach to dealing with registered sex offenders. According to statistics from the U.S. Department of Justice, of the estimated 24 million child Internet users, one in five children online is sexually solicited, yet only one in four of these tells a parent or guardian.

H.R. 3132 The Sex Offender Registration and Notification Act of 2005 was legislation introduced by in the US House of Representatives, by Congressman James F. Sensenbrenner, Jr. (R-WI), in order to increase and tighten tracking of sex offenders and provide standards for notifying the public about these predators. This legislation advanced in several forms: H. Res. 436, H.R. 3133: Sex Offender Registration and Notification Act, H.R. 4472: Adam Walsh Child Protection and Safety Act of..., and H.R. 4905: Sex Offender Registration and Notification Act. HR 3132 received 88 cosponsors and was forwarded to the Senate on September 15, 2005, where it became S1086.

The bill eventually became law as the Child Safety and Protection Act of 2006, and was signed July 27, 2006, on the 25th anniversary of Adam Walsh's death.

== Membership ==
The Senate Caucus on Missing, Exploited and Runaway Children is bipartisan.

=== Founding members ===
- Senator Mike DeWine (R-OH), Co-chair
- Senator Blanche Lincoln (D-AR), Co-chair
- Senator Richard Shelby (R-AL), Co-chair
- Senator Lamar Alexander (R-TN)
- Senator Bob Bennett (R-UT)
- Senator Joe Biden (D-DE)
- Senator Mike Crapo (R-ID)
- Senator Christopher Dodd (D-CT)
- Senator Charles Grassley (R-IA)
- Senator Orrin Hatch (R-UT)
- Senator Kay Bailey Hutchison (R-TX)
- Senator Patrick Leahy (D-VT)
- Senator Mitch McConnell (R-KY)
- Senator Mark Pryor (D-AR)
- Senator Charles Schumer (D-NY)
- Senator George Voinovich (R-OH)

=== Members ===
- Senator Hillary Clinton (D-NY)
- Senator Johnny Isakson (R-GA)
- Senator Ted Kennedy (D-MA)

== See also ==
- Adam Walsh Child Protection and Safety Act
- House Caucus on Missing and Exploited Children
- John Walsh
- Patty Wetterling
- Sex offender registries in the United States
- Bud Cramer
- Mark Foley
