= Legal status of fictional pornography depicting minors =

Legal frameworks around fictional pornography depicting minors vary depending on country and nature of the material involved. Laws against production, distribution, and consumption of child pornography generally separate images into three categories: real, pseudo, and virtual. Pseudo-photographic child pornography is produced by digitally manipulating non-sexual images of real minors to make pornographic material (for example, deepfake pornography). Virtual child pornography depicts purely fictional characters, including drawn (for example, lolicon and shotacon works) or digitally (AI) generated. "Fictional pornography depicting minors", as covered in this article, includes these latter two categories, whose legalities vary by jurisdiction, and often differ with each other and with the legality of real child pornography.

Some analysts have argued whether or not cartoon pornography that depicts minors is a victimless crime. Laws have been enacted to criminalize "obscene images of children, no matter how they are made", typically under the belief that such materials may incite real-world instances of child sex abuse. Currently, countries that have made it illegal to possess as well as create and distribute sexual images of fictional characters who are described as, or appear to be, under the age of eighteen include New Zealand, Australia (strictest in the world), Brazil, Canada, South Africa, South Korea, and the United Kingdom.

== Arguments for and against legal regulation around the world ==
There is debate over whether cartoon pornography such as comics, illustrations, or anime that sexually depicts purely fictional minor characters or young-looking fictional adults actually leads to sexual crimes against minors, and whether legally regulating such content constitutes a violation of freedom of expression and artistic creation which even democracies tried to outlaw such fictional.

=== Opinions in opposition of legal regulation ===
Cultural anthropologist Patrick W. Galbraith based his research on Japan's crime statistics, showing that sexual abuse of minors has decreased in Japan since the spread of lolicon media increased in the 1960s and 1970s, argued that cartoon pornographic images do not necessarily influence crime.

A 2012 report by the Sexologisk Klinik for the Danish government claimed that there is no evidence that individuals that view cartoons and drawings depicting fictitious child sexual abuse are more likely to engage in child sexual abuse in the real world.

=== Opinions in favour of legal regulation ===
Those in favour of legally regulating that cartoon pornographies, argue that simple comparison of crime statistics is meaningless due to the possibility of actual crimes that are not captured in statistics, and that there are cases that actually led to sexual abuse against child because of such creations, such as Tsutomu Miyazaki's case.

Legal scholar Hiroshi Nakasatomi argues that lolicon material can distort consumers' sexual desires and induce crime, a view shared by the non-profit organization CASPAR, whose founder Kondo Mitsue argues that "freedom of expression does not allow for the depiction of little girls being violently raped, depriving them of their basic human rights".

Some critics, such as the non-profit organization Lighthouse, argue that lolicon works can be used for sexual grooming, and that they encourage a culture which accepts sexual abuse of children.

Feminist critic Kuniko Funabashi argues that the themes of lolicon material contribute to sexual violence by portraying girls passively and by "presenting the female body as the man's possession".

== Jurisdictions where fictional pornography depicting minors is illegal ==
=== Australia ===
All sexualized depictions of people under the age of 18 are illegal in Australia, with the country being notably strict in regards to fictional and simulated depictions of sexual imagery including children.

Australia has the RC rating which severe bans or censor many video games, films, or animation that depict young-looking explict girls, as well as having stricter airport checks for all electronics and devices, even if the media found on them did came from any online websites or social media such as YouTube, X, Telegram or Pixiv, which results in thousands of arrests every year.

In December 2008, a man from Sydney was convicted of possessing child pornography after sexually explicit pictures of underage characters from The Simpsons were found on his computer. The New South Wales Supreme Court upheld a Local Court decision that the animated Simpsons characters "depicted", and thus "could be considered", real people.

=== Canada ===
Canadian laws addressing child pornography are set out in Part V of the Canadian Criminal Code, dealing with Sexual Offences, Public Morals and Disorderly Conduct: Offences Tending to Corrupt Morals. Section 163.1 of the Code, enacted in 1993, defines child pornography to include "a visual representation, whether or not it was made by electronic or mechanical means", that "shows a person who is or is depicted as being under the age of eighteen years and is engaged in or is depicted as engaged in explicit sexual activity", or "the dominant characteristic of which is the depiction, for a sexual purpose, of a sexual organ or the anal region of a person under the age of eighteen years". The definitive Supreme Court of Canada decision, R. v. Sharpe, interprets the statute to include purely fictional material even when no real children were involved in its production. Some cases in the media have shown that section 163.1 has been applied to written and audiovisual material as well.

There have been at least three major cases brought up against the possession of fictional pornography within the last two decades. In April 2010 visiting American citizen Ryan Matheson (also known as Brandon X) was arrested in Ottawa for bringing erotica based on Lyrical Nanoha. By October 2011 he was charged with possession and importation of child pornography and faced a minimum of 1 year in prison. The next case occurred in 2014 where a man from Nova Scotia was sentenced to 90 days after pleading guilty of possessing mostly anime images. Roy Franklyn Newcombe, 70, pleaded guilty to the charge after a NSCAD student found a USB thumb drive with sexually explicit images and videos at a computer lab in April 2014. There was no indication the images involved local people or had been manufactured by Newcombe. Most of the 20 images were anime, although a few appeared to be of real girls between five and 13 years old. The most recent case occurred in Alberta when on February 19, 2015, the Canada Border Services Agency intercepted a parcel and arrested its recipient on March 27. Based on the box art of a sculpture being shipped to him, four charges were pressed: possession/distribution, mailing obscene matter, and smuggling prohibited goods. These charges were withdrawn as part of a plea deal when the accused agreed to a peace bond.

=== Ecuador ===
The possession, storing, fabrication, or distribution of child pornography or any other kind of sexually explicit pedophilic material, including fictional erotica (drawn, written, animated, etc.), is illegal under Ecuadorian law.

=== Estonia ===
Fictional child pornography of any form (drawn, written etc.) is illegal in Estonia per article 178 of the Penal Code. This law does not apply to Estonian citizens who legally commit the offense abroad and as of 2021 nobody has yet been charged for fictional child pornography. Precedent exists to exclude written material with literary value ("literary work" and "pornographic work" are defined differently under law), while current law remains unclear on visual art of artistic value like classical painting or manga as no precedent exists. Real pornography with underage-looking adult actors remains technically legal.

=== France ===
Since a reform of the French penal code, introduced in 2013, producing or distributing drawings that represent a minor aged less than 15 years old is considered the same as producing real child pornography and is punishable by up to five years' imprisonment and a €75,000 fine, even if the drawings are not meant to be distributed. French cartoonist Bastien Vivès faced controversy over works like Petit Paul and La Décharge mentale, which depict sexual acts involving minors, leading to a 2023 prosecution for “creating and distributing pornographic images of minors”. Under Article 227-23 of the French Penal Code, even fictional images depicting sexual conduct of children under 15 are illegal. Although the 2025 court halted proceedings citing lack of jurisdiction and no substantive trial occurred, the case has become a significant example in France of the legal boundaries between artistic freedom and child protection.

=== Ireland ===
Virtual child pornography is illegal in Ireland per the Child Trafficking and Pornography Act of 1998 which includes "any visual representation". The country has strict laws when it comes to child abuse material, even if it does not contain any "real children".

=== Italy ===
Virtual child pornography is punished with up to a third of the sanctions for real-life child pornography. Virtual images include images, or parts of images, produced and modified with software from actual photos of minors, where the quality makes it so that fake situations are manipulated to appear realistic. Under this law, fictional child pornography is also considered illegal.

Though on a recent sentence it has been observed that the conduct of those who hold this type of child pornography material prefigures an impedimental crime where the anticipation of protection appears difficult to justify due to the lack of victims, thus creating a potential friction with the principle of offensiveness in relationship with the Italian constitution and therefore making it not punishable by the law.

=== New Zealand ===
In New Zealand, the Films, Videos, and Publications Classification Act 1993 classifies a publication as "objectionable" if it "promotes or supports, or tends to promote or support, the exploitation of children, or young persons, or both, for sexual purposes". Making, distribution, import, or copying or possession of objectionable material for the purposes of distribution are offences punishable (in the case of an individual) by a fine of up to NZ$10,000 on strict liability, and ten years in prison if the offence is committed knowingly.

In December 2004, the Office of Film and Literature Classification determined that Puni Puni Poemy—which depicts nude children in sexual situations, though not usually thought of as pornographic by fans—was objectionable under the Act and therefore illegal to publish in New Zealand. A subsequent appeal failed, and the series remained banned until 2021, when it was passed uncut with an R16 rating.

In April 2013, Ronald Clark was jailed for possession of anime that depicts sex between elves, pixies, and other fantasy creatures. It was ruled as obscene and he was jailed for three months following the trial. Clark was previously convicted for indecently assaulting a teenage boy and his lawyer noted that ethical issues complicated the case.

=== Poland ===
Since the 2008 amendment to the Polish Penal Code, simulated child pornography has been forbidden in Poland. Article 202 § 4b penalizes the production, dissemination, presentation, storage or possession of pornographic content depicting the created or processed image of a minor under the age of 18 participating in a sexual activity. The perpetrator shall be subject to a fine, the penalty of restriction of liberty or deprivation of liberty for up to 2 years.

This law faced criticism from legal experts. Maciej Wrześniewski questioned the legitimacy of this article, arguing that "it is not possible to unquestionably confirm the age of a depicted person—since such a person does not in fact exist". This opinion was shared by Maciej Szmit, who called the whole article "unfortunately worded". According to the Polish prosecution authorities, if the age of a depicted person is in question, a court may appoint anthropological experts to determine it.

From 2009 to 2018, 152 people were indicted under Article 202 § 4b. From 2008 to 2020, there were 23 people found guilty under Article 202 § 4b (as a primary crime). It is unknown in how many cases, if any, the judgment concerned drawn pornography, as this law is also used for pseudo-photographic child pornography, such as when photographs of children's faces are pasted onto sexually explicit images of adults' bodies.

One of the cases where the discussed Article 202 § 4b of Polish Penal Code was used in court was the case of a painter Krzysztof Kuszej. In 2011, Kuszej was charged with committing a number of prohibited acts, including "presenting processed images of minors engaging in sexual acts with intent to sell on an online auction website". 21 pieces of artwork depicting sexual acts between children and priests were secured from the artist's studio. The artist argued in court, that his art is a social commentary on subject of Catholic Church sexual abuse cases, and his artistic measures were adequate for the problem. The expert witness in art history commissioned by the court, Izabela Kowalczyk, stated that these works were art rather than pornography. According to the expert, Kuszej's images do not seduce viewers and their message against child sexual abuse is apparent. Contrary to the expert witness's opinion, the court ruled that the defendant's works did indeed include pornographic content involving minors. However, according to the court, the artist's intent was not to promote the presentation of such content, but only to showcase his position on the condemnation of child sexual abuse. The court found that the artist did not identify his work with child pornography or its dissemination. The defendant could not be proven guilty of committing the crime intentionally, and the court acquitted him of all charges.

=== Russia ===
Paragraph 1 of Article 242.1 of the Criminal Code of the Russian Federation makes it illegal to create, acquire, store, and/or move across the Russian border (including through the Internet) pornographic pictures of minors for the purpose of distribution. This law also applies to drawings depicting minors, as in January 2019, a court in Bryansk sentenced a woman to three years in prison for posting erotic drawings on her webpage. In January 2020, the Russian appellate court overturned Michelle's original conviction, finding that there were procedural injustices in the initial trial and ordered a retrial. Subsequently, Michelle was released, and the case was sent back to the Bryansk Regional Court for reconsideration.

=== South Africa ===
With the promulgation of the Films and Publications Amendment Bill in September 2003, a broad range of simulated child pornography became illegal in South Africa. For the purposes of the act, any image or description of a person "real or simulated" who is depicted or described as being under the age of 18 years and engaged in sexual conduct, broadly defined, constitutes "child pornography". Under the act, anyone is guilty of an offence punishable by up to ten years' imprisonment if he or she possesses, creates, produces, imports, exports, broadcasts, or in any way takes steps to procure or access child pornography.

=== South Korea ===
The Supreme Court of South Korea ruled on November 8, 2019, that sexually explicit anime and manga depicting minors are child pornography, overturning a previous decision by a lower court. According to The Korea Herald, the decision was made as a result of the prosecution of a 45-year-old man, known only by his surname "Lim", who had previously been arrested and convicted for illegally sharing pornography for profit between May 2010 and April 2013. Though Lim was sharing adult animations depicting teenage characters, Lim was initially found guilty solely of sharing pornography for personal profit by both the first and high courts. The court found it unreasonable to convict Lim of disseminating child pornography based on the schoolgirl uniforms and young appearance of the characters featured in the animations. Lim was fined ₩5,000,000 ($4,300 USD) for this conviction. However, the Supreme Court overturned this previous ruling, declaring that, despite the mature themes being presented, the characters were considered to be underage based on the clothing and the context of the animations as considered from "the perspective of a common individual of our society".

=== Switzerland ===
"Pornographic documents, sound or visual recordings, depictions or other items of a similar nature or pornographic performances" showing "non-genuine sexual acts with minors" are illegal according to art. 197 of the Swiss Criminal Code and liable to a custodial sentence not exceeding three years or to a monetary penalty. Purely fictional virtual child pornography—in this case, drawings and paintings— seemed to remain legal by Swiss law. New cases however complicate the matter, as contrary to the previous case a man was found guilty and fined under this law in 2021. Though it is noteworthy that he possessed real images as well. In addition, the expert body of the Swiss Crime Prevention states that even depictions in comics and manga would be illegal under the current law.

Swiss otaku “Melonpan” attended Comiket and mailed about 30 kilograms (around 66 pounds) of doujinshi — most of them with “loli” themes — back to Switzerland. His package was seized by customs, and he was questioned about it. He shared the process on Twitter, saying he feared harsh punishment (he had previously been fired from his job over his connection to erotic works). After some discussions, customs officers ultimately acknowledged that the materials were purely drawn works with no real people involved. He later posted photos on Twitter showing what appeared to be the returned books. The incident has often been cited to illustrate how different countries treat sexualized depictions of fictional underage characters, with places like Canada and the UK having taken stricter criminal measures in similar cases.

=== United Arab Emirates ===
In the United Arab Emirates, articles 1 and 36 of the Federal Decree-Law No. 34 of 2021 on Countering Rumors and Cybercrimes define and provide punishment for "child pornographic materials". The law was passed in September 2021 and came into force in January 2022 with the publishing of Gazette No. 712. Article 1 of the law defines "child pornography" as "the produc[tion], display, dissemination, possession, or circulation of a photo, movie, or a drawing through any means of communication, social networks, or any other means or tool that shows the child involved in a dishonorable situation in a sexual act or show whether real, fictional or simulated". The Khaleej Times summarized the law by stating that "[child pornographic] materials include photographs, recordings, drawings or any actual, virtual or simulated sexual acts with a juvenile under the age of 18".

Article 36 of the Law provides that the willful possession of any child pornographic materials by the use of an information service, network, website, or information technology equipment is punishable with imprisonment for not less than 6 months or a fine of not less than 150,000 or more than 1,000,000 AED. The UAE Public Prosecution Office has stated on Instagram that drawings are covered under the law.

=== United Kingdom ===
In the United Kingdom, the Coroners and Justice Act 2009 (which took effect in April 2010), made the possession of fictional pornography involving minors illegal. The Act's provisions only apply in Wales, England, and Northern Ireland, but do not apply in Scotland.

==== History ====
In 2006, the government was giving close consideration to the issues and options regarding cartoon pornography, according to Vernon Coaker. On December 13, 2006, Home Secretary John Reid announced that the Cabinet was discussing how to ban computer-generated images of child abuse—including cartoons and graphic illustrations of abuse—after pressure from children's charities. The government published a consultation on April 2, 2007, announcing plans to create a new offence of possessing a computer-generated picture, cartoon or drawing with a penalty of three years in prison and an unlimited fine.

The children's charity NCH stated that "this is a welcome announcement which makes a clear statement that drawings or computer-generated images of child abuse are as unacceptable as a photograph". Others stated that the intended law would limit artistic expression, patrol peoples' imaginations, and that it is safer for pedophiles' fantasies "to be enacted in their computers or imaginations [rather] than in reality".

The current law was foreshadowed in May 2008, when the government announced plans to criminalise all non-realistic sexual images depicting minors. These plans became part of the Coroners and Justice Act 2009, sections 62–68, and came into force on April 6, 2010. The definition of a "child" in the Act included depictions of 16- and 17-year-olds who are over the age of consent in the UK, as well as any adults where the "predominant impression conveyed" is of a person under the age of 18. The law was condemned by a coalition of graphic artists, publishers, and MPs, who feared it would criminalise graphic novels such as Lost Girls and Watchmen.

The government claimed that publication or supply of such material could be illegal under the Obscene Publications Act, if a jury would consider it to have a tendency to "deprave and corrupt". However, the Act as passed makes no reference to the "deprave and corrupt" test.

In October 2014, Robul Hoque was convicted of possessing up to 400 explicit manga images involving fictional children, in the UK's first prosecution of its kind. He received a 9-month suspended sentence.

== Jurisdictions where fictional pornography depicting minors is legal ==
=== Colombia ===
The Supreme Court of Justice of Colombia ruled in 2018 that "artificial child pornography" is not a crime. This applies to non nude photographs, drawings, animation, and situations that do not involve actual abuse. The penal code was modified afterwards by adding the word "real" when referring to representations.

=== Denmark ===
There are no laws in Denmark which prohibit pornographic drawings of children, but it has recently been outlawed if produced in the form of an erotic doll. Results of a Danish government study done in 2012 failed to show how reading cartoons depicting child pornography will lead to actual child abuse.

=== Finland ===
Producing and distributing pornography which realistically or factually depicts a child—basically photographic images—is illegal in Finland and punishable by a fine or up to two years' imprisonment. Possession of such pornography is punishable by a fine or imprisonment for up to one year.

Realistic and factual visual depiction of a child appearing in sexual acts is defined as it having "been produced in a situation in which a child has actually been the object of sexually offensive conduct and realistic, if it resembles in a misleading manner a picture or a visual recording produced through photography or in another corresponding manner of a situation in which a child is the object of sexually offensive conduct".

Purely fantasy-based virtual child pornography—in this case, drawings and paintings—remains legal by Finnish law because it has no connection to a real abuse situation; also, such depictions may serve informational or artistic purposes which can make even reality-based images legal.

=== Germany ===
In principle, the regulations in Chapter 13 of the German Criminal Law for offenses against sexual self-determination also prevent the public advocation and the degradation of minors as sexual objects. The distribution of child pornography, defined as pornography relating to "sexual acts performed by, on or in the presence of a person under 14 years of age (child), the reproduction of a child in a state of full or partial undress in an unnaturally sexual pose, or the sexually provocative reproduction of a child's bare genitalia or bare buttocks", is criminalized with a penalty of imprisonment. However, with regards to possession, only material depicting actual or realistic acts is criminalized. For reproductions of persons over 14 but under 18 years (youth pornography), the penalty for distribution is imprisonment or a fine.

Nevertheless, due to the guaranteed freedom of art, fictional works were officially deemed legal or can be checked by a legal opinion. According to German legal information websites, acquisition and possession of fictional pornography depicting minors where it is immediately apparent that the content is purely of fictional nature, such as cartoons and comics or anime and manga, are not prosecuted against unless it is not readily distinguishable whether the depiction is computer-generated or real. The Federal Court of Justice also made clear that the criminal offense "should remain limited" to cases "in which an actual event is reproduced through video film, film or photo". On the other hand, it did not regard the sanction of the regulation as fulfilled in the case of "child pornographic novels, drawings and cartoons", because, according to the ruling, their possession does not contribute to children being abused as "actors" in pornographic recordings.

=== Japan ===
All forms of fictional pornography depicting minors and young-looking characters (such as lolicon, shotacon) are legal in Japan as long as genitalia is censored in accordance with Article 175 of the Criminal Code which prohibits obscenity. The last law proposed against it was introduced on May 27, 2013, by the Liberal Democratic Party, the New Komei Party and the Japan Restoration Party that would have made possession of sexual images of individuals under 18 illegal with a fine of 1 million yen (about US$10,437) and less than a year in jail. The Japanese Democratic Party, along with several industry associations involved in anime and manga, protested against the bill, saying "while they appreciate that the bill protects children, it will also restrict freedom of expression". The law was ultimately passed in June 2014 after the regulation of lolicon anime/manga was removed from the bill. This new law went into full effect in 2015 banning real life child pornography.

Supporters of regulating simulated pornography in Japan claim to advocate human rights and children's rights such as the UN Convention on the Rights of the Child. Opponents such as the Japan Federation of Bar Associations also claim to advocate for the rights of children, pointing out the decreasing numbers in sexually motivated crimes are due to simulated materials providing an outlet to those who would otherwise seek material depicting actual children. Arguments made against a ban include manga creator and artist Ken Akamatsu who stated that "There is also no scientific evidence to prove that so-called 'harmful media' increases crime". The use of the term 'drawings', as written in the 1999 bill regarding the ban on child pornography, has been argued as ambiguous.

=== Mexico ===
In Mexico any speech related to sexual preferences (such as fictional art) is protected under the legislation from Articles 13(3) that provides "the right of expression may not be restricted by indirect methods or means, such as the abuse of government or private controls over newsprint, radio broadcasting frequencies, or equipment used in the dissemination of information, or by any other means tending to impede the communication and circulation of ideas and opinions" and the Article 1 that provides "Any form of discrimination, motivated by [...] sexual preferences, status or any other which attempt on human dignity or seeks to annul or diminish the rights and liberties of the people, is prohibited".

Furthermore, there is a council obligated to protect sexual preference rights. On 29 April 2003 the Federal Law to Prevent and Eliminate Discrimination was passed, gives rise to the creation of the National Council to Prevent Discrimination (Consejo Nacional para Prevenir la Discriminación, CONAPRED), which is in charge of "develop[ing] actions to protect all citizens from every distinction or exclusion based on [...] sexual preferences, marital status or any other, that prevents or annuls the acknowledgement or the exercise of the rights and the real equality of opportunities of persons".

== Jurisdictions with a legal gray area regarding fictional pornography depicting minors ==
=== Argentina ===
Possession of child pornography is illegal in Argentina with prison sentences between three and six years. Before a modification on the Penal Code was promulgated on April 23, 2018, the law did not prohibit the mere possession, but other activities such as production, financing, trading, and distribution were punishable by imprisonment ranging from 6 months to 4 years. The law is unclear though when it comes to drawings or artistic representations.

ICMEC and UNICEF claimed Argentina only criminalize images involving real children.

=== Austria ===
Photorealistic (lit. "close to reality") depictions are prohibited, and are treated as regular child pornography. The definition of "reality" as with other countries that cite the same reasoning is not defined.

=== Brazil ===
Brazilian law prohibits the production, sale, distribution, possession, and other forms of dealing with material depicting sexual violence against children or adolescents. Under the Code of Minors (Estatuto da Criança e do Adolescente), a child is a person under the age of 12, while an adolescent is a person between the ages of 12 and 17. Until 2026, art. 241-E was generally understood as requiring the involvement or representation of a real child or adolescent. As a result, purely fictional drawings, 3D artwork, and other graphic representations of fictional minors, including the Japanese manga/hentai subgenres commonly known as lolicon and shotacon, were generally considered outside the scope of Brazil's child-pornography offenses. This changed on 6 August 2026 with the enactment of Laws 15,211/2025 (Digital Code of Minors) and 15,487/2026. The amended art. 241-E expressly defines material or content involving sexual violence against children or adolescents as any representation, by any means, involving a child or adolescent, "real or fictitious", including digitally produced, manipulated, or generated images. The provision applies where the representation depicts sexual activity, contains nudity for a sexual or libidinous purpose, or otherwise presents the depicted minor in a sexual or libidinous context. Anime, manga, or animations are in a legal gray area as the law does not mention them and these laws were specifically enforced to target AI deepfakes, even though if taken literally the law refers to any fictional depictions whatsoever.

The original article 241 of ECA referred to scenes of explicit sex involving children or adolescents. In 2003, it was amended to include any pornographic depiction. The Brazilian judiciary later ruled that any sexual content, even without explicit nudity, is to be included under this law.

=== Chile ===
In Chile, the possession of lolicon and similar material is not penalized by law. In particular, the 2011 update of Law No. 20.526 of the penal code differentiates the concept of "pseudopornografía infantil" (child pseudopornography) and "pornografía seudoinfantil" (pseudochild pornography), defined as that content that "uses graphics processing programs that allow combining two images into one, making pornographic representations of adults simulate the participation of minors", with respect to virtual, drawn, simulated or artificial child pornography.

It indicates that the first type is where the captured image or voice of a minor is used and through virtual manipulations it is incorporated into a pornographic production, so as to make it appear that the minor actually participated in the sexual actions shown. The second type consists of the creation by computer means and without using the image or voice of a person, pornographic images or sounds.

In addition, the bill stipulates that it "deals only with the first form referred to since it is in it where the privacy of a minor is violated", thus penalizing pseudo-pornography child pornography along with actual child pornography, but excluding virtual, drawn or simulated child pornography.

=== Netherlands ===
As of October 1, 2024, article 252 of the Dutch criminal code has replaced the former article 240b. At present article 252 of the Dutch criminal code reads:

"Anyone who spreads, sells, openly exhibits, manufactures, imports, transports, exports, acquires, possesses, or accesses by any means, a visual display of a sexual nature, or with an unmistakable sexual scope in which a person who seemingly has not yet reached the age of eighteen years old, is involved, or appears to be involved, will be punished with a prison sentence of up to six years, or a fine of the fifth category (up to €82,000).

The article, or any adjacent articles, makes no distinction between a real or fictional 'visual display', and no further mention is made of fictional works, 3D renders, or AI-generated content. However, the use of the word 'person' in the article could be interpreted to say that the article only applies to 'visual displays' of real people, as the definition of a 'person' in Dutch law is generally used to refer to real-world human beings of flesh and blood, not fictional characters.

Furthermore, in an instruction document from the public prosecutor's office, it is explicitly stated that the new article is not intended to change the scope of the previous article (240b). As such the precedent set by the 2010 and 2013 cases mentioned below are still relevant to the context of the new article.

==== Relevant cases ====
In a 2010 case, after viewing the images in question, which were created on a computer, the court opined that the virtual child pornography images did not fall under criminal law. "All images can be termed as pornographic (three dimensional) cartoons, animations, or drawings. The court concludes that it is immediately obvious to the average viewer that the event is not real and that the images are manipulated images and not realistic".

In 2013, the Supreme Court of the Netherlands ruled that "a realistic depiction of a non-existent child in the sense that the depiction is indistinguishable from real" is illegal, but that when "the persons depicted are 'not real children' and that for 'the average viewer (and also children) ... it soon becomes apparent that these are manipulated images'", such depictions are not illegal. The court arrived at this verdict due to the wording in the law, stating that the "or appears to be involved" section of the article could not be proven for works that can be immediately identified as fictional. The court further noted that the lawmaker did not intend for this phrase to criminalize all such depictions, rather only depictions that are indistinguishable from reality. As such the court noted that every such image should be judged on its individual merits.

==== Legality ====
While the 2013 ruling appears to set a precedent for legality of fictional pornography depicting minors, both the official government website and the official Dutch police website state that such depictions are illegal across the board. In practice any ambiguous material will be judged on a case-by-case basis, and the more realistic the material appears to be, the more likely it is to be declared illegal. However, at present no clear assessment can be made about the overall legality.

=== Spain ===
Spain allows drawn pornography which does not resemble real children, including cartoons, manga or similar representations, as the law does not consider them to be properly 'realistic images'. The Attorney General's Office considers that only extremely realistic images should be pursued. "In order to avoid undue extensions of the concept of child pornography, the concept of 'realistic images' must be interpreted restrictively. According to the Dictionary of the Royal Spanish Academy 'realist' means that which 'tries to adjust to reality'. Therefore, 'realistic images' will be images close to the reality which they try to imitate". However, images that are too realistic, even paintings, are strictly prohibited due to the law of European Union. This can be understood as images that cannot be distinguished from children in reality by normal people.

=== Sweden ===
Any images or videos that depict children in a pornographic context are to be considered child pornography in Sweden, even if they are drawings. A "child" is defined as a "person" who is either under the age of 18 or who has not passed puberty.

These laws have been recorded in the media being put into play in Uppsala: the district court punished a man with a monetary fine and probation for possession of manga-style images. This was appealed and taken to the Court of Appeal. In court, Judge Fredrik Wersäll stated that a "person" (as in the definition of a "child") is a human being. The man possessing the illustrations, as well as his lawyer, stated that a comic character is not a person (a comic character is a comic character and nothing else) and that a person does not have cat ears, giant eyes, or a tail and that a person has a nose. Some of the pictures featured illustrations of characters with these unusual body parts. The prosecutor and an expert on child pornography argued that these body parts had no effect and that the comic characters indeed were persons. As examples of what is not a person, the child pornography expert mentioned The Simpsons and Donald Duck. The Court of Appeal upheld the former verdict, for 39 of the 51 pictures, and the monetary fine was reduced. It was immediately further appealed to the Supreme Court. While the Prosecutor General agreed with the verdict of the Court of Appeal, he still recommended that the Supreme Court hear the case, to clarify the issue, and the Supreme Court decided to do so. On June 15, 2012, the Supreme Court found him not guilty. They decided that the images were not realistic and could not be mistaken for real children, and that they therefore could not be counted as exceptions to the constitutional law of freedom of speech. One picture was still considered realistic enough to be defined as child pornography according to Swedish law. However, his possession of it was considered defensible through his occupation as a professional expert of Japanese culture, particularly manga.

=== Taiwan ===
The Child and Youth Sexual Exploitation Prevention Act (兒童及少年性剝削防制條例) introduced in 1995 forbids any child pornography in Taiwan. Since the law did not discuss whether the law should forbid pornography depicting minors or not, Taiwanese courts in practice did not punish pornography depicting minors mostly, although punishing cases do exist.

In January 2023, Taiwan introduced an amendment to Article 2 of the act, which defines sexual exploitation as:

[F]ilming, producing, distributing, broadcasting, delivering, publicly displaying, or selling any sexual image or video of a child or a youth, or any drawing, audio recording, or any other item of a child or a youth that is sexually relevant and, by objective standards, arouses sexual desire or shame...

From December 2023, several websites received removal requests from the Institute of Watch Internet Network (iWIN網路內容防護機構) under the act for publicly displaying fictional child pornography. Due to anime and manga having a huge influence on Taiwanese content creators' creating styles and the high consumption of anime and manga, the requests sparked controversies among the Internet and local content creators. Several legislators of the Legislative Yuan questioned the law's legality to fictional creations. Japanese politician Ken Akamatsu also expressed his concern about the controversies. In May 2024, the Ministry of Health and Welfare released an interpretation, limiting the definition of "images of a child or a youth" to those who are based on real minors, or realistic generative AI, excluding completely fictional anime and manga from the definition.

Opinions on regulating fictional pornography depicting minors are mixed. Chen Yi-lin (陳逸玲), the secretary general of a child protection group ECPAT Taiwan (台灣展翅協會), believed that Optional Protocol on the Sale of Children, Child Prostitution and Child Pornography, in which the Child and Youth Sexual Exploitation Prevention Act follows, includes regulating fictional pornography depicting minors and allowing them will promote real child pornography, thus should regulate. Liu Chia-hao (劉佳豪), the general director of ACG Occupational Union (臺北市動漫企劃人員職業工會), says there's no research or evidence can prove that fictional pornography depicting minors promotes real child pornography. Legal scholar Hsieh Yu-wei (謝煜偉) expressed his concern that the regulation will cause court judgments to be too arbitrary. Hsieh also indicates the mixed opinions on regulation may cause controversies in the near future.

=== United States ===
==== 1973–2002 ====
In the United States, pornography is generally protected as a form of personal expression, and thus governed by the First Amendment to the Constitution. Where pornography ceases to be protected expression is when it fails the Miller obscenity test, as the Supreme Court of the United States held in 1973 in Miller v. California. Another case, New York v. Ferber (1982), held that if pornography depicts real child abuse or a real child victim, as a result of photographing a live performance for instance, then it is not protected speech (regardless of whether the material is obscene under the test).

In 1996, the U.S. Congress introduced the Child Pornography Prevention Act of 1996 (CPPA) to update the types of pornographic media featuring minors considered illegal under U.S. federal law. In 2002, the United States Supreme Court ruled in Ashcroft v. Free Speech Coalition that two provisions of the CPPA were facially invalid due to being overbroad in banning materials that are neither obscene under Miller, nor produced via the exploitation of real children as in Ferber. In doing so, the case also reaffirmed Ferber while acknowledging the state of things under Miller.

==== 2003–2007: PROTECT Act ====
In response to Ashcroft v. Free Speech Coalition, Congress passed the PROTECT Act of 2003 (also dubbed the Amber Alert Law) which was signed into law on April 30, 2003, by American president George W. Bush. The PROTECT Act adjusted its language to meet the parameters of the Miller, Ferber, and Ashcroft decisions. The Act was careful to separate cases of virtual pornography depicting minors into two different categories of law: child pornography law and obscenity law. In regards to child pornography law, the Act modified the previous wording of "appears to be a minor" with "indistinguishable from that of a minor" phrasing. This definition does not apply to depictions that are drawings, cartoons, sculptures, or paintings depicting minors or adults. Furthermore, there exists an affirmative defense to a child pornography charge that applies if the depiction was of a real person and the real person was an adult (18 or over) at the time the visual depiction was created, or if the visual depiction did not involve any actual minors. This affirmative defense does not apply to child pornography created via morphing, namely depictions "created, adapted, or modified to appear that an identifiable minor is engaging in sexually explicit conduct".

The PROTECT Act also enacted 18 U.S.C. § 1466A into U.S. obscenity law:

Section 1466A of Title 18, United States Code, makes it illegal for any person to knowingly produce, distribute, receive, or possess with intent to transfer or distribute visual representations, such as drawings, cartoons, or paintings that appear to depict minors engaged in sexually explicit conduct and are deemed obscene.

Thus, virtual and drawn pornographic depictions of minors may still be found to violate federal obscenity law. The obscenity law further states in section C "It is not a required element of any offense under this section that the minor depicted actually exist".

The constitutionality of statutes governing non-child pornography is determined by the three-prong Miller test. If material is found obscene under the Miller test, then it is not protected by the First Amendment. Under the Miller test, whether material is obscene is determined by:

- Whether "the average person, applying contemporary community standards", would find that the work, taken as a whole, appeals to the prurient interest,
- Whether the work depicts or describes, in a patently offensive way, sexual conduct or excretory functions specifically defined by applicable state law,
- Whether the work, taken as a whole, lacks serious literary, artistic, political, or scientific value.

By the statute's own terms, the law does not make all fictional child pornography illegal, only that found to be "obscene" or "lacking in serious value". The mere possession of said images is not a violation of the law unless it can be proven that they were transmitted through a common carrier, such as the mail or the Internet, transported across state lines, or of an amount that showed intent to distribute. There is also an affirmative defense made for possession of no more than two images with "reasonable steps to destroy" the images or reporting and turning over the images to law enforcement.

The first major case occurred in December 2005, when Dwight Whorley was convicted in Richmond, Virginia under 18 U.S.C. 1466A for using a Virginia Employment Commission computer to receive and distribute "obscene Japanese anime cartoons that graphically depicted prepubescent female children being forced to engage in genital-genital and oral-genital intercourse with adult males". On December 18, 2008, the Fourth Circuit Court of Appeals affirmed the conviction, consisting of 20 years' imprisonment. Whorley appealed to the Supreme Court, but was denied certiorari, meaning the appeal was not heard.

Brian Dalton was convicted in Ohio for possessing child pornography based on fictional child sexual abuse content in his private diary, but his conviction was later overturned because his defense attorney failed to raise a First Amendment free speech defense. The court ultimately ruled that the fictional content in his private writings is protected by free speech and does not constitute a crime. This case became a landmark as the first in the U.S. to convict and then overturn a conviction based on privately created written material, highlighting the legal balance between protecting free expression and preventing child exploitation.

In 2003, the Illinois Supreme Court ruled in *People v. Alexander* that the state law prohibiting the possession and distribution of computer-generated virtual child pornography was unconstitutional because it failed to distinguish between real children and virtual images, making the law overly broad and infringing on free speech rights. The court severed the offending provisions and remanded the case to the lower court for further proceedings, emphasizing the need for laws to balance protecting children with constitutional rights in the face of technological advancements.

==== 2008–present ====
18 U.S.C. § 1466A has faced legal challenges regarding its modifications to obscenity law. In particular, the provisions of the law that establish an alternative obscenity test to the Miller standard have been challenged. In October 2008, a 38-year-old Iowa comic collector named Christopher Handley was prosecuted for possession of explicit lolicon manga. The judge ruled that two parts of the act that were broader than the Miller standard, 1466A a(2) and b(2), were unconstitutionally overbroad as applied to this case, but Handley still faced an obscenity charge. Handley was convicted in May 2009 after he entered a guilty plea at the recommendation of his attorney, believing that the jury would not acquit him of the obscenity charges.

A later ruling in United States v. Dean (2011) called the overbreadth ruling into question because the Handley case failed to prove that 1466A a(2) and b(2) were substantially overbroad on their face; Dean was convicted under the sections previously deemed unconstitutional due to the fact that the overbroadth claim in Handley was an as-applied overbroadth challenge, and was therefore limited to the facts and circumstances of that case, whereas in Dean the defendant was charged under 1466A a(2) for possession of material constituting actual child pornography, which does not require a finding of obscenity, and was read to fall within the language of the relevant statute. The facts of this case precluded Dean from satisfying the substantive due process requirements to satisfy a proper facial challenge against the relevant statutes.

At the state level, some states have laws that explicitly prohibit cartoon pornography and similar depictions, while others have only vague laws on such content. In California such depictions specifically do not fall under state child pornography laws, while in Utah they are explicitly banned. However, there are legal arguments that state laws criminalizing such works are invalid in the wake of Ashcroft, and some judges have rejected these laws on constitutional grounds. Accordingly, the Illinois Supreme Court in 2003 ruled that a statute criminalizing virtual child pornography was unconstitutional per the ruling in Ashcroft. On a federal level, works depicting minors that offend contemporary community standards and are "patently offensive" while lacking "serious literary, artistic, political, or scientific value"—that is, found to be "obscene" in a court of law—continue to stand as illegal, but only if the conditions for obscenity discussed above are met: mere possession of these works continues to be legal. Legal professor Reza Banakar has since stated that "serious artistic value" is very difficult to evaluate, and that the legal task of evaluating the lack of such value cannot be executed objectively.

Because United States obscenity law determines what is obscene by reference to local standards on a case-by-case basis, the legality of drawn or fictitious pornography depicting minors is ultimately left in a gray area much like other forms of alternative pornography. Some states pay less mind to the contents of such materials and determine obscenity based on time and place an offense may occur, while others may have strict, well-defined standards for what a community may be allowed to find appropriate. Others only may have vague laws or definitions which are only used to allow the government to prosecute recidivist offenders on both a federal and state level.

In May 2025, Texas Senate Bill 20, also known as the "Stopping AI-Generated Child Pornography Act" passed by the Texas Legislature on May 28, 2025, unanimously in both chambers, and was signed into law by Governor Greg Abbott on June 20, 2025. The law, which went into effect on September 1, 2025, creates new criminal offenses for those who possess, promote, or view visual material deemed obscene, which is said to depict an underage person, under age 18, whether it is an actual person, animated or cartoon depiction, or an image of someone created through computer software or artificial intelligence. The law gives Texas police more provisions to restrict artificial intelligence-created child pornography, and those charged with this felony offense could go to state jail, but this could be elevated if the person charged as a prior conviction, of a $10,000 fine and two years in prison. Critics described the law as unconstitutional, saying it violated the Free Speech Clause of the First Amendment which prohibits abridgement of freedom of speech and the press, including the legal precedent set in Ashcroft v. Free Speech Coalition. The Comic Book Legal Defense Fund vowed to support those wrongly accused under the law. Much of the controversy regarding S.B. 20 involves the broad language pertaining to "obscene" pornographic images as including A.I.-created, animated, and cartoon depictions, with some critics arguing it could have a chilling effect on anime, manga, graphic novels, and other media produced, distributed, or created within Texas.

==== Cases ====
At least nine cases have been publicized by the mainstream media or documented since the 2008 Iowa ruling or made publicly available, in six of these cases the perpetrator either had a prior criminal record, or was also involved with real-life child pornography which contributed to the charges.

Karen Fletcher is a writer from Pennsylvania, USA, who was federally prosecuted in 2006 and pleaded guilty in 2008 for publishing fictional stories involving child sexual abuse and violence on her subscription-based website. The court ruled that her works met the legal standard for obscenity and sentenced her to five years of probation and a fine, sparking widespread debate about the boundaries between free speech and child protection.

In October 2010, when a 33-year-old man from Idaho named Steven Kutzner entered into a plea agreement concerning images of child characters from the American animated television show The Simpsons engaged in sexual acts. The incident was identified, and reported to U.S. authorities by German federal police who were able to obtain Kutzner's IP address. This particular address contained a known file from which actual child pornography was being shared. A subsequent forensic investigation uncovered "six hundred and thirty two (632) image files, seventy (70) of which were animated images graphically depicting minors engaging in sex acts", "five hundred and twenty-four (524) pornographic image files, most of which depict what appears to be teenaged females", and "more than eight thousand files containing images of child erotica involving younger children, many of them prepubescent".

In November 2011, Joseph Audette, a 30-year-old computer network administrator from Surry, Maine, was arrested after his username was linked to child pornography sites. In this instance a search inside Audette's home also uncovered "anime child pornography". A judge eventually lifted all bond restrictions placed on him as Audette was never formally charged after his arrest.

In People v. Gerber (2011, 196 Cal.App.4th 368), the California Court of Appeal overturned a conviction against a father who digitally pasted his 13-year-old daughter's face onto adult pornographic images. The court ruled that this did not violate California Penal Code §311.11, which criminalizes possession of child pornography involving a real minor "personally engaging" in sexual conduct. Since the images were digitally manipulated and did not depict the actual child involved in any sexual activity, the court held that they did not meet the legal definition of child pornography. The decision aligned with the U.S. Supreme Court's ruling in Ashcroft v. Free Speech Coalition (2002), reaffirming that purely virtual or fictional content—without the involvement of real minors—is protected by the First Amendment.

In late January 2013, after being reported by his wife, a 36-year-old man named Christian Bee in Monett, Missouri entered a plea bargain for possession of cartoons depicting child pornography, with the U.S. attorney's office for the Western District of Missouri recommending a 3-year prison sentence without parole. The office in conjunction with the Southwest Missouri Cyber Crimes Task Force argued that the "Incest Comics" on Bee's computer "clearly lack any literary, artistic, political, or scientific value". Bee was originally indicted for possession of actual child pornography, but, as part of a plea deal, that charge was modified to the offense of possession of "incest comics".

Danny Borgos, an inmate at FCI Seagoville already serving a sentence for possession of child pornography, was found "with a paginated series of drawings, consisting of 37 pages in a comic or coloring book-style format, three girls between the ages of 6 and 11 'engaging in sexually explicit conduct during a 2014 search. Borgos, who pled guilty on the advice of counsel and was sentenced to a consecutive 10-year term of imprisonment, attempted to challenge the judgment in 2017 with a post-conviction petition. Borgos argued that the drawn pictures should be "considered art, not obscene". However, referencing the factual basis for his guilty plea, the reviewing judge observed that Borgos had "confessed that these visual depictions ... [comprised] a 'bunch of drawings of children having sexual intercourse and an adult male sexually assaulting three little girls'", implicating the definition of child pornography established by the United States Congress in 18 U.S.C. § 2256(2)(A). Because Borgos had admitted to the obscene nature of the fictional images, his conviction under 18 U.S.C. § 1466A(b)(1) and 1466A(d)(5) for "Possession of Obscene Visual Representations of the Sexual Abuse of Children" was not vulnerable to collateral attack.

In May 2015, John R. Farrar, a federal inmate serving his sentence for a prior conviction for actual child pornography possession in 2007, was found with "seven hand-drawn images depicting the [sexual] exploitation of minor females" as well as "two hand-written books, describing sexual abuse of minors" on his workbench, and was indicted for six of the images, given the 10 year minimum sentence, extending his overall prison time by about 4 years, despite his no contest plea in the initial trial, he attempted to appeal the sentence under the pretense the images were not obscene and that his sentence violated the Eight Amendment, his appeal was shot down.

On July 11, 2017, David R. Buie, who was under supervised release for a prior conviction relating to crimes involving the sexual victimization of actual minors, was reported by staff at his local library, and subsequently indicted under 1466A(b)(1), for printing a full-color drawing that depicted a boy engaging in sex with adults that appear to be his parents, Buie appealed the decision under the pretense that (b)(1) is vague, overbroad, and encroached on protected speech, the appeal was rejected and he given the sentence of 121 months (or 10 years) and a lifetime of supervised release, which he also appealed.

On May 18, 2018, a registered sex offender from Newport News, Virginia was sentenced to over 19 years in prison for the attempted receipt of obscene images, obstruction of justice, destruction of evidence, and sex offender penalties. Elmer E. Eychaner, III (aged 46) was described as having a significant history of sexual offenses involving minors. He had most recently been convicted in 2008 for child pornography crimes in federal court. During this instance Eychaner requested a laptop to search for a better job while on federal supervision. He instead violated the terms of his supervision by using the computer to look up obscene anime cartoon images depicting the sexual abuse of minors.

Thomas Alan Arthur, who lived in Terlingua, Texas and operated a website by the name of "Mr. Double", in which several thousand authors had submitted over 25,000 stories depicting the rape, murder, and sexual abuse of children through a manually-reviewed form, had his residence raided in November 2019 and himself indicted and later charged in October 2020 with: two counts of producing, distributing, receiving, and possessing an obscene visual depiction of a minor engaged in sexually explicit conduct, five counts of using an interactive computer service to transport obscene matters, and one count of engaging in the business of selling or transferring obscene matters. During the trial, Circuit Judge, James L. Dennis, dissented from the ruling and asked for a new trial, arguing that the exclusion of Arthur's expert of choice; Dr. David Ley, had affected the ruling, and proposed the possibility that an expert like Dr. Ley could've testified of the "therapeutic benefits for some individuals suffering pedophilic disorder" of the Erotica that Arthur had on his website.

Jesse Fernando Perez was found guilty on August 7, 2023, for producing and possessing obscene visual representations of the sexual abuse of children in FCI Petersburg, a low-medium security federal prison, violating 1466A(a)(1) and (b)(1). Perez was sentenced to 10 years. Perez appealed to acquit, arguing FCI Petersburg was not part of the territories the United States had jurisdiction over and arguing that his convictions are unconstitutional; his appeal was denied.

The Arkansas Supreme Court overturned 11 convictions against Jeremy Lewis related to “distributing, possessing, or viewing” child pornography under Ark. Code § 5-27-602. The Court found that the images in question were computer-generated (CGI) and did not depict or incorporate the image of an actual child. Even though the law prohibits possession of “computer-generated images” under § 5-27-602(a)(2), the statute is limited to images that depict or incorporate a *natural person under 17 years old* engaging in sexually explicit conduct. Because there was no evidence that the CGI images actually showed a minor (or incorporated an image of one), Lewis's convictions on those 11 counts were reversed for failure of proof.

In the Indiana case Grecco v. State (2024), the defendant was charged under state child pornography laws for possessing Japanese anime-style images depicting fictional minors in sexual situations. However, the Court of Appeals ultimately ruled the defendant not guilty, finding that the images did not involve real children and, though disturbing, were protected as fictional artistic expression under the First Amendment. Citing the U.S. Supreme Court's decision in Ashcroft v. Free Speech Coalition, the court affirmed that purely fictional or computer-generated child pornography does not constitute a crime. This case established a significant legal precedent in Indiana that fictional content alone does not violate child pornography laws.

== See also ==
- Artistic freedom
- Moral panic
- Censorship
- Freedom of speech
- Pornography laws by region
- Simulated child pornography
- Victimless crime
- Gamer's dilemma
