= John Feldmeier =

American lawyer

John Phillip Feldmeier
- Born: March 16, 1966 (age 60); Columbus, Ohio
- Education: Ohio Dominican University (B.A.); Capital University (J.D.); Miami University (Ph.D.)
- Occupation: Attorney

John Phillip Feldmeier is an attorney with the Cincinnati, Ohio law firm of Sirkin, Kinsley, & Nazzarine (a spin-off of the now-dissolved Sirkin, Pinales, & Schwartz LLP), where he practices in the areas of criminal defense and first amendment litigation. He served as co-counsel for the Free Speech Coalition, along with H. Louis Sirkin and Laura A. Abrams, in Ashcroft v. Free Speech Coalition, in which the United States Supreme Court struck down the "appears to be a minor" and "conveys the impression of a minor" provisions of the Child Pornography Prevention Act of 1996. Feldmeier represented Beth Lewis in the Ohio Supreme Court case concerning attorney–client privilege in connection to the Erica Baker missing child investigation. In 2003, he testified before the United States House Judiciary Subcommittee on Crime, Terrorism, and Homeland Security regarding the Child Obscenity and Pornography Prevention Act of 2003, part of the PROTECT Act of 2003. In 2007, Feldmeier authored a friend-of-the-court brief on behalf of the Free Speech Coalition in the U.S. v Williams case, the contents of which were the subject of much of the focus of the opinions of both the majority and dissent.

He also has served in the past as an adjunct professor at Miami University, where he taught constitutional law, and he currently holds the position of associate professor of political science at Wright State University. He is a board member of the Greater Cincinnati Criminal Defense Lawyers Association and an active member of the National Association of Criminal Defense Lawyers.

== Biography ==
Feldmeier attended Groveport Madison High School in Columbus, Ohio, and after graduating pursued his college degree at the Ohio Dominican University. He graduated magna cum laude in 1988 with a degree in political science.

Feldmeier received his J.D. from Capital University Law School in 1991. While at Capital, he was a member of the Delta Theta Phi law fraternity and also served as a member of the Capital University Law Review. He received his Ph.D. from Miami University in 1996. After serving as an attorney with the Ohio Ethics Commission, he joined Sirkin, Pinales, & Schwartz LLP in 1997.

=== Notable cases ===
- Ashcroft v. Free Speech Coalition
- United States v. Williams – Filed Amicus Brief
- State v. Doe, 101 Ohio St.3d 170, 2004-Ohio-705

== Publications ==
=== Books ===
- Hall, Daniel, and John P Feldmeier. Constitutional Values: Governmental Power and Individual Freedoms. Prentice Hall, 2009. ISBN 978-0-13-171769-5.

=== Articles ===
- "Close Enough for Government Work: An Examination of Congressional Efforts to Reduce the Government's Burden of Proof in Child Pornography Cases", N. Ky. L. Rev., (2003) 30: 205
- "Virtual Crime, Real Time: Criminalizing Depictions of Virtual Reality", Politics in Action, 2nd ed., McGraw Hill (2001)
- "Federalism and Full Faith and Credit: Must States Recognize Out-of-State Same-Sex Marriages?". Publius: The Journal of Federalism. 1995. doi:10.1093/oxfordjournals.pubjof.a038216.
- "Fetal Politics: The Implementation and Impact of UAW v. Johnson Controls", Southeastern Political Review (1995)
- "United States v. Verdugo-Urquidez: Constitutional Alchemy of the Fourth Amendment", Capital University Law Review, Vol. 20-2 (1991)
- The exception to the rule: Public policy exceptions to the Full Faith and Credit Clause and their role in American federalism, Miami University DAI-A 57/11, p. 4906, May 1997
