= Simulated child pornography =

Pornography with simulated child involvement

Simulated child pornography is child pornography depicting humans who appear to be minors, but which is produced without direct involvement of minors.

== Types ==
Types of this form of pornography include:

- Fully computer-generated imagery
- Adults made to look like children
- Drawings or animations that depict sexual acts involving minors but are not intended to look real
- Modified photographs of adults
- Modified photographs of real children

=== Virtual child pornography ===
In the United Kingdom, the Coroners and Justice Act of April 2009 (c. 2) created a new offence in England, Wales, and Northern Ireland of possession of a prohibited image of a minor. This act makes cartoon/virtual pornography depicting minors illegal in England, Wales, and Northern Ireland. Since Scotland has its own legal system, the Coroners and Justice Act does not apply. This act did not replace the 1978 act, extended in 1994, since that covered "pseudo-photographs"—images that appear to be photographs. In 2008 it was further extended to cover tracings and other works derived from photographs or pseudo-photographs. A prohibited cartoon/virtual image is one which involves a minor in situations which are pornographic and "grossly offensive, disgusting or otherwise of an obscene character". Prior to this, although not explicitly in the statutes, the law was interpreted to apply to cartoon/virtual images, though only where the images are realistic and indistinguishable from photographs. The new law, however, covered images whether or not they are realistic.

Child pornography is unlawful in the United States. In New York v. Ferber, the U.S. Supreme Court held that it is not protected by the First Amendment, and even if not obscene, it is not considered protected speech. In Ashcroft v. Free Speech Coalition, 535 U.S. 234 (2002), however, the Supreme Court held that child pornography that is produced without using an actual minor (computer-generated images, for example) is protected by the First Amendment if not found to be obscene. This decision allowing virtual child pornography in the U.S. has had international consequences. For example, French virtual child pornography producers have moved their files to servers in the United States because of its wider free speech protection. Subsequent to Ashcroft, however, the federal PROTECT Act of 2003 provides that any realistic-appearing computer-generated depiction that is indistinguishable from a depiction of an actual minor in sexual situations or engaging in sexual acts is illegal under 18 U.S.C. § 2252A.

In Canada, the Supreme Court of Canada ruled in 1992 that obscene pornography was not protected expression in R v Butler, stating that while a direct causal link from obscenity to real world harm may be "difficult, if not impossible, to establish" it was reasonable to presume a causal link to "changes in attitudes and beliefs". The following year, the 34th Canadian Parliament led by Prime Minister Kim Campbell made child pornography and its fictional artworks a crime in 1993, both to be charged with the same severity. Following the 2001 Supreme Court trial R v Sharpe, Chief Justice Beverley McLachlin continued to maintain that "Parliament was justified in concluding that visual works of the imagination would harm children". The following year, the 37th Canadian Parliament led by Prime Minister Jean Chretien criminalized online access to child pornography, including fictional representations as well.

In the Australian state of Victoria, it is illegal to publish imagery that "describes or depicts a person who is, or appears to be, a minor engaging in sexual activity or depicted in an indecent sexual manner or context".

=== Cartoon images ===
The hentai subgenres known as lolicon and shotacon have been the subject of much controversy regarding impact on child sexual abuse. Pornographic parody images of popular cartoon characters, known as Rule 34, have also been challenged around the world. Images depicting underage The Simpsons characters have been of particular concern in Australia and in the United States.

In the Czech Republic, a study showed that rates of "offending declined following the legalization of all types of pornography."

In Canada, federal government committee findings of "adults who use the materials to persuade other children to engage in similar conduct" has been used to justify the prohibition of sexual depictions of children, whether their production involves child abuse or not. In response, the Canadian Civil Liberties Association (CCLA) argued that the fictional pornography itself is not to blame when any item could be used as a tool for grooming by child molesters, stating that "pedophiles have been known to resort to candy as well". The CCLA further argued that outlawing all items that could possibly be abused would be undesirable. In October 2005, 26-year-old Gordon Chin was the first Canadian to be convicted for possession and importation of cartoon child pornography and sentenced to prison for eighteen months.

In the United States, child pornography laws do not apply to drawings, cartoons, sculptures, and paintings of minors in sexual situations under 18 U.S.C. § 2256. However, they remain subject to obscenity laws if they do not pass the Miller test and are potentially illegal under 18 U.S.C. § 1466A. The PROTECT Act includes prohibitions against illustrations, including computer-generated illustrations, that are to be found obscene in a court of law. Previous provisions outlawing virtual child pornography in the Child Pornography Prevention Act of 1996 had been ruled unconstitutional by the U.S. Supreme Court in its 2002 decision, Ashcroft v. Free Speech Coalition. The PROTECT ACT attached an obscenity requirement under the Miller test or a variant obscenity test to overcome this limitation.

The subgenres have also been made illegal in some countries, like the United Kingdom and South Korea.

== Second Life controversy ==
In 2007, the virtual world online computer game Second Life banned what its operator describes as "sexual 'ageplay', i.e., depictions of or engagement in sexual conduct with avatars that resemble children". The ban prohibits the use of childlike avatars in any sexual contexts or areas, and prohibits the placement of sexualized graphics or other objects in any "children's areas" such as virtual playgrounds within the game environment. Those Second Life residents who are caught ageplaying are given a warning stating that their actions are considered "broadly offensive" within the Second Life community and that "the depiction of sexual activity involving minors may violate real-world laws in some areas."

Second Life is not the only community facing virtual child pornography allegations. In 2007, World of Warcraft banned the player organization "Abhorrent Taboo", because the organization allowed player characters to engage sexually with role-playing children and real ones.

== See also ==
- Child erotica
- Child pornography laws in Canada
- Child Pornography Prevention Act of 1996
- Relationship between child pornography and child sexual abuse
- Simulated child pornography in the United States
- Legal status of fictional pornography depicting minors

== Bibliography ==
- Brey, P., "Virtual Reality and Computer Simulation," in Himma and Tavani (2008), pp. 361–384.
