= United States v. Handley =

2008 United States federal court case

- Court: United States District Court for the Southern District of Iowa
- Full case name: United States of America v. Christopher S. Handley
- Decided: July 2, 2008
- Docket nos.: 1:07-cr-00030
- Citation: 564 F. Supp. 2d 996

Court membership
- Judge sitting: James E. Gritzner

United States v. Handley, 564 F. Supp. 2d 996 (2008), was a court case in the United States District Court for the Southern District of Iowa involving obscenity charges stemming from the importation of manga featuring pornographic depictions of fictional minors.

Although Handley ultimately pled guilty, District Judge James E. Gritzner ruled that 18 U.S.C. § 1466A(a)(2) and 18 U.S.C. § 1466A(b)(2) were constitutionally infirm because those subsections restrict protected speech and do not require the visual depictions be obscene. He also held that the determination of what constituted obscenity under 18 U.S.C. § 1466A(a)(1) and 18 U.S.C. § 1466A(b)(1) was to be made by the trier of fact. Referring to previous U.S. Supreme Court cases on obscenity and child pornography, he held, "Free Speech Coalition made clear that banned material must meet either the Ferber or Miller standards. There is no dispute the images in this case do not involve real children, thus Ferber is inapplicable."

== Arrest ==
In May 2006, postal inspectors attained a search warrant for the home of 38-year-old Iowa comic collector Christopher Handley, who was suspected of importing "cartoon images of objectionable content" from Japan. Authorities seized 1,200 items from Handley's home, of which about 80 were deemed "drawings of children being sexually abused". Many of the works had been originally published in Comic LO, a lolicon manga anthology magazine.

In October 2008, the Comic Book Legal Defense Fund became involved in the case as a consultant and financial supporter, with Eric Chase of its United Defense Group providing Handley's legal defense. Chase argued, "there are no actual children. It was all very crude images from a comic book." This was related to obscenity charges involving pornography depicting minors, being applied to a fictional comic book. On this, Chase said, "This prosecution has profound implications in limiting the First Amendment for art and artists, and comics in particular that are on the cutting edge of creativity. It misunderstands the nature of avant-garde art in its historical perspective and is a perversion of anti-obscenity laws." Charles Brownstein of the CBLDF commented: "The government is prosecuting a private collector for the possession of art. In the past, CBLDF has had to defend the First Amendment rights of retailers and artists, but never before have we experienced the federal government attempting to strip a citizen of his freedom because he owned comic books."

== Trial ==
United States district court Judge James E. Gritzner was petitioned to drop some of the charges, but instead ruled that two parts of the PROTECT Act criminalizing certain depictions without having to go through the Miller test were unconstitutionally overbroad. Handley still faced an obscenity charge. The motion was initially heard on June 24, 2008, but was not widely publicized prior to the Fund's involvement. CBLDF board member Neil Gaiman remarked on how this could apply to his work The Doll's House, saying, "if you bought that comic, you could be arrested for it? That's just deeply wrong. Nobody was hurt. The only thing that was hurt were ideas."

== Sentencing ==
Handley entered a guilty plea in May 2009; at Chase's recommendation he accepted a plea bargain believing it highly unlikely a jury would acquit him if shown the images in question.

In February 2010, under the terms of plea, Handley was sentenced to six months in jail. Without the plea, he would have faced a maximum of 15 years in prison and a $250,000 fine. Upon release he was required to undergo three years' supervised release and five years' probation. Under the plea agreement, he is excluded from being required to register as a sex offender.

== See also ==
- Laws regarding child pornography
- Legal status of drawn pornography depicting minors
- PROTECT Act of 2003
- Lolicon
- Censorship
- Texas Senate Bill 20
