= United States v. Williams (2008) =

- Supreme Court of the United States

Argued October 30, 2007 Decided May 19, 2008
- Full case name: United States, Petitioner v. Michael Williams
- Docket no.: 06-694
- Citations: 553 U.S. 285 (more) 128 S. Ct. 1830; 170 L. Ed. 2d 650; 2008 U.S. LEXIS 4314; 76 U.S.L.W. 4275; 21 Fla. L. Weekly Fed. S 238

Case history
- Prior: Defendant convicted and sentenced, No. 04–20299, (S.D. Fla., Aug. 20, 2004); rev'd, 444 F.3d 1286 (11th Cir. 2006); 549 U.S. 1304 (2007).

Holding
- Federal statute prohibiting the pandering of child pornography was not unconstitutionally overbroad, because there is no First Amendment protection for offering to engage in illegal transactions.

Court membership
- Chief Justice John Roberts Associate Justices John P. Stevens · Antonin Scalia; Anthony Kennedy · David Souter; Clarence Thomas · Ruth Bader Ginsburg; Stephen Breyer · Samuel Alito

Case opinions
- Majority: Scalia, joined by Roberts, Stevens, Kennedy, Thomas, Breyer, Alito
- Concurrence: Stevens, joined by Breyer
- Dissent: Souter, joined by Ginsburg

Laws applied
- U.S. Const. amend. I; 18 U.S.C. § 2252A(a)(3)(B) (PROTECT Act of 2003)

United States v. Williams, 553 U.S. 285 (2008), was a decision by the Supreme Court of the United States that a federal statute prohibiting the "pandering" of child pornography (offering or requesting to transfer, sell, deliver, or trade the items) did not violate the First Amendment to the United States Constitution, even if a person charged under the code did in fact not possess child pornography with which to trade.

The decision overturned the Eleventh Circuit's ruling that the statute was facially void for overbreadth and vagueness. The Supreme Court reasoned that there is no First Amendment protection for offers to engage in illegal transactions, and that banning "the collateral speech that introduces such material into the child-pornography distribution network" does not in fact criminalize a "substantial amount of protected speech."

== Background ==
On April 26, 2004, as part of an undercover operation aimed at combating child exploitation on the Internet, Special Agent (SA) Timothy Devine, United States Secret Service, Miami Field Office, entered an Internet “chat” room using the screen name “Lisa n Miami” (LNM). Devine observed a public message posted by a user employing a sexually graphic screen name, which was later traced to the defendant, Michael Williams. Williams's public message stated that “Dad of toddler has ‘good’ pics of her an [sic] me for swap of your toddler pics, or live cam.” Devine, as "LNM", engaged Williams in a private Internet chat during which they swapped non-pornographic photographs. Williams provided a photograph of a two to three-year-old female lying on a couch in her bathing suit, and five photographs of a one to two-year-old female in various non-sexual poses, one of which depicted the child with her chest exposed and her pants down just below her waistline. Devine sent a non-sexual photo of a college-aged female digitally regressed to appear 10–12 years old, who LNM claimed was her daughter.

After the initial photo exchange, Williams claimed that he had nude photographs of his four-year-old daughter, stating “I’ve got hc [hard core] pictures of me and dau, and other guys eating her out—do you?” Williams asked for additional pictures of "LNM"’s daughter. When these pictures were not received, Williams accused Devine of being a police officer. Devine responded by accusing Williams of being a police officer. After repeating these accusations in the public part of the chat room, Williams posted a message stating “HERE ROOM; I CAN PUT UPLINK CUZ IM FOR REAL—SHE CANT.” The message was followed by a computer hyperlink, which Devine accessed. The computer hyperlink contained, among other things, seven images of actual minors engaging in sexually explicit conduct. The nude children in the photos were approximately five to fifteen years old, displaying their genitals and/or engaged in sexual activity.

Secret Service agents executed a search warrant of Williams's home. Two computer hard drives seized during the search held at least 22 images of actual minors engaged in sexually explicit conduct or lascivious display of genitalia. Most of the images depicted prepubescent children and also depicted sado-masochistic conduct or other depictions of pain. Williams was charged with one count of promoting, or “pandering,” material “in a manner that reflects the belief, or that is intended to cause another to believe,” that the material contains illegal child pornography in violation of 18 U.S.C. § 2252A(a)(3)(B), which carries a 60-month mandatory minimum sentence. Williams was also charged with one count of possession of child pornography under 18 U.S.C. § 2252A(a)(5)(B). Williams filed a motion to dismiss the pandering charge on the grounds that 18 U.S.C. § 2252A(a)(3)(B) is unconstitutionally overbroad and vague. While the motion was pending before the trial court, the parties reached a plea agreement by which Williams would plead guilty to both counts but reserve his right to challenge the constitutionality of the pandering provision on appeal. The court sentenced Williams to 60 months.

== Important notes/dictation ==
The Court further stated that 18 U.S.C. § 2252A(a)(3)(B) would not be construed to punish the solicitation or offering of "virtual" (computer generated/animated) child pornography, thus comporting with the holding of Ashcroft v. Free Speech Coalition, 535 U.S. 234.

United States v. Panfil, 338 F.3d 1299, 1300 (11th Cir. 2003). “Pandering” is defined as the catering to or exploitation of the weaknesses of others, especially “to provide gratification for others’ desires.” As a legal concept, pandering is most commonly associated with prostitution. In that context, pandering provisions are statutes penalizing various acts by intermediaries who engage in the commercial exploitation of prostitution and are aimed at those who, as agents, promote prostitution rather than against the prostitutes themselves. The term pandering, in some instances, is applied by Congress and the courts to the promotion of obscenity. See, e.g., 39 U.S.C. § 3008 (prohibiting pandering advertisements of sexually provocative materials by mail), Ginzburg v. United States, 383 U.S. 463, 86 S. Ct. 942, 16 L.Ed.2d 31 (1966) (considering obscene nature of erotically advertised publications). Congress has characterized both the child pornography regulation at issue in this case (18 U.S.C. 2252A(a)(3)(B)) and its unconstitutional predecessor (18 U.S.C. § 2256(8)(D) (1996)) as “pandering” provisions. imprisonment for the pandering charge and sixty months for the possession charge, to be served concurrently.

In keeping with Ashcroft v. Free Speech Coalition, 535 U.S. 234 (2002), The Court stated that "an offer to provide or request to receive virtual child pornography is not prohibited by the statute. A crime is committed only when the speaker believes or intends the listener to believe that the subject of the proposed transaction depicts real children. It is simply not true that this means 'a protected category of expression [will] inevitably be suppressed,' post, at 13. Simulated child pornography will be as available as ever."

== Legacy ==
The law was cited in reference to discussions about Texas Senate Bill 20, stating that the law, which creates new criminal offenses for those who possess, promote, or view visual material deemed obscene, which is said to depict a child, whether it is an actual person, animated or cartoon depiction, or an image of someone created through computer software or artificial intelligence, with Ariana Garcia of Chron saying that the case clarified that "promoting material that appears to involve minors in explicit acts can be criminalized if it could mislead others into believing it involves real children."

== In popular culture ==
A photograph of a bag placed on the Supreme Court decision United States v. Williams (2008) appeared in the Balenciaga "Garde-Robe" campaign in November 2022. This campaign coincided with another Balenciaga advertisement featuring six children holding teddy bears dressed in bondage and BDSM gear, surrounded by empty wine glasses and champagne flutes. Five days later, Balenciaga removed both campaigns and apologized.

== See also ==
- PROTECT Act of 2003 – United States law regarding child abuse and violent crimes against children
