= Castillo v. Texas =

Obscenity trial in Texas, United States

Castillo v. State
- Court: Texas Court of Appeals
- Full case name: Jesus A. Castillo, Jr., Appellant, v. The State of Texas, Appellee.
- Decided: July 2, 2002
- Citation: 79 S.W.3d 817

Case history
- Appealed to: Supreme Court of the United States (denied March 24, 2003)

Court membership
- Judges sitting: Tom James, Kerry Fitzgerald, Molly Francis

Case opinions
- Decision by: Francis
- Dissent: James

Keywords
- Obscenity law

Castillo v. Texas, 79 S.W. 3d 817 (Tex. 2002) was a controversial Texan court decision in which Jesus Castillo, an employee of a comic book store in Dallas, Texas, was charged with two counts of "display of obscenity", and convicted for one, after selling adult comics to an adult.

== Background ==
The sales took place in late 1999, at which time Castillo was working as a clerk in Keith's Comics, a store that had come under investigation for allegations of making obscene material accessible to minors. The store did in fact carry pornographic material, but in a clearly marked, restricted section not accessible to underaged customers. During this time, a plainclothes police officer bought said materials from Castillo, leading to the arrest of Castillo and his undergoing a court trial some months later.

The counts were over the sales of Demon Beast Invasion and Legend of the Overfiend, both of which are hentai manga (pornographic Japanese comics). The two were set to be tried separately. The Demon trial ended with a guilty verdict, the prosecution's argument to the jury being based on the claim that "comics are for children" and that the item was therefore designed to appeal to children, and the fact that the store was across the street from an elementary school. Notably, the trial featured experts Scott McCloud and Susan J. Napier testifying for the defense.

Castillo was sentenced to 180 days in jail (since suspended), a year's probation, and a $4,000 fine. The Legend trial was subsequently dropped. The case was appealed to the Fifth District Court of Appeals, where it was upheld in a split decision, and later on to the Texas Court of Criminal Appeals as well as eventually to the U.S. Supreme Court; both were denied.

The case drew considerable controversy (and incredulity), especially online. Public opinion was on Castillo's side, and the trial was widely considered absurd. The $4,000 for the fine was collected via fund-raisers. It also came to the attention of the Comic Book Legal Defense Fund, which became heavily involved and spent tens of thousands of dollars for Castillo's defense. Keith's Comics has since voluntarily removed comics with a rating worse than 'R' from its selection.
