= Mobile Alliance Against Child Sexual Abuse Content =

The Mobile Alliance Against Child Sexual Abuse Content was founded in 2008 by an international group of mobile operators within the GSM Association to work collectively on obstructing the use of the mobile environment by individuals or organisations wishing to consume or profit from child sexual abuse content.

While the vast majority of child sexual abuse content (child pornography) is today accessed through conventional connections to the Internet, there is a danger that broadband networks now being rolled out by mobile operators could be misused in the same way.

== Goal ==
The Alliance's ultimate aim is to help stem, and ultimately reverse, the growth of non approved content around the world. Through a combination of technical measures, co-operation and information sharing, the Alliance seeks to create significant barriers to the misuse of mobile networks and services for hosting, accessing, or profiting from not approved content.

== Member commitments ==
Members of the Alliance agree to, among other measures: · support and promote ‘hotlines’ or other mechanisms for customers to report child sexual abuse content discovered on the Internet or on mobile content services. · implement notice and take down processes to enable the removal of any child sexual abuse content posted on their own services · implement technical mechanisms to prevent access to websites identified by an appropriate agency as hosting child sexual abuse content

The Alliance encourages all mobile operators worldwide, regardless of access technology, to participate in the Alliance.

== Founding members ==
The founding members of the Mobile Alliance were:

- GSMA
- Hutchison 3G Europe
- mobilkom austria
- Orange FT Group
- Telecom Italia
- Telefónica/O2
- Telenor Group
- TeliaSonera
- T-Mobile Group
- Vodafone Group
- dotMobi
- NForceIT Org

== See also ==
- GSM Association
- Optional Protocol to the Convention on the Rights of the Child
- Internet Watch Foundation
- Financial Coalition Against Child Pornography
- ECPAT
