= Groveport Madison High School =

Groveport-Madison High School
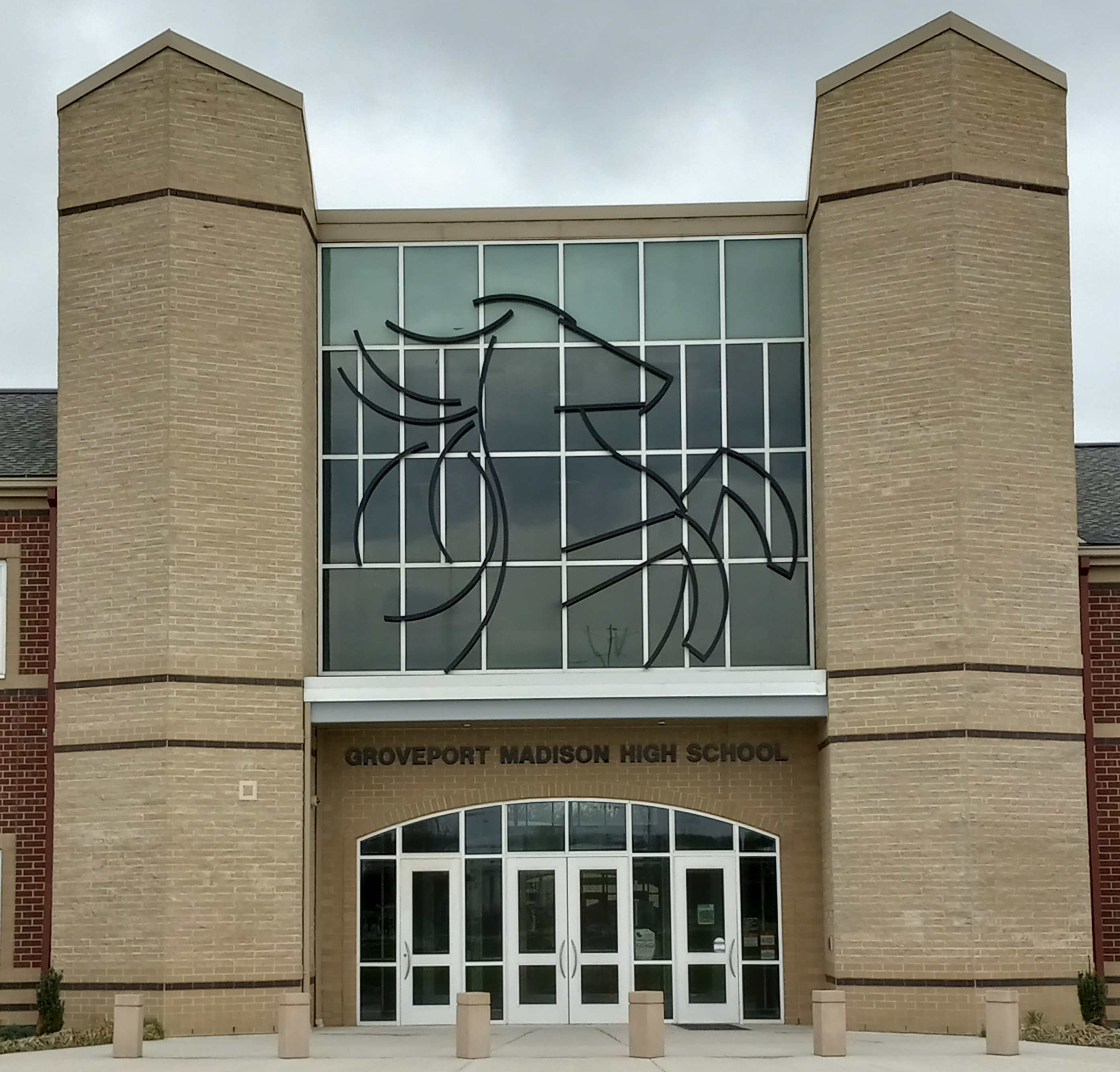

Location
- 4475 South Hamilton Road; Groveport, Ohio 43125; United States; 39°52′46″N 82°53′7″W

Information
- Type: Public high school
- Motto: It’s Great To Be A Cruiser
- School district: Groveport-Madison Local Schools
- Superintendent: Jeremiah Smith
- Principal: Mike Mike
- Teaching staff: 98.00 (FTE)
- Grades: 9-12
- Student to teacher ratio: 18.41
- Colors: Red and black
- Athletics conference: Ohio Capital Conference
- Team name: Cruisers
- Rival: Canal Winchester Indians
- Website: http://www.gocruisers.org

Groveport-Madison High School is a high school in Groveport, Ohio, United States. The school's mascot is the Cruiser, a horse tamed by John Solomon Rarey.

== Cruiser Football ==
The current coach for the 2021-2022 season is Mitch Westcamp.

== Eastland-Fairfield Career & Technical School ==
School	Location	Satellite Locations	School Districts	Grades
Eastland-Fairfield Career & Technical School	Eastland: Groveport, Ohio Fairfield: Carroll, Ohio	Lincoln High School; Groveport Madison High School; New Albany High School; Pickerington High School North; Reynoldsburg High School; Canal Winchester High School	16 School Districts	11–12

== Notable alumni ==
- Bryan Quinby, professional podcaster; host of Guys, A Podcast About Guys, former Violence Gang member and former cohost of Street Fight Radio.
- Le'Veon Bell, professional football player; selected by Pittsburgh Steelers in second round (48th overall) of 2013 NFL draft
- Calvin Booth, former professional basketball player and general manager of the Denver Nuggets; selected by Washington Wizards in second round (35th overall) of 1999 NBA draft
- John Feldmeier, attorney and Wright State University professor
- Thomas J. Hennen, astronaut
- Amor L. Sims, Brigadier general, USMC, during World War I and World War II
- Tony Lowery, former Wisconsin Badgers football quarterback, 1987 Big Ten Freshman of the Year, Arena Football League
- Lilia Osterloh, professional tennis player
- Eric Smith, professional football player; selected by New York Jets in third round (97th overall) of 2006 NFL draft with highest compensatory pick in team history
- Wyatt Worthington II, professional golfer
- Dawuane Smoot, professional football player; selected by Jacksonville Jaguars in third round (68th overall) of 2017 NFL draft
- Michael White, hip-hop artist, better known as Trippie Redd
