= Texas Senate Bill 20 =

2025 Texas law

Senate Bill 20

Texas Legislature
- Long title: Relating to the creation of the criminal offense of possession, promotion, or production of certain obscene visual material appearing to depict a child.
- Territorial extent: Texas
- Enacted by: Texas Senate
- Enacted: May 26, 2025
- Enacted by: Texas House of Representatives
- Signed by: Greg Abbott
- Signed: June 20, 2025
- Effective: September 1, 2025

Initiating chamber: Texas Senate
- Introduced by: Pete Flores, Brent Hagenbuch, Juan Hinojosa, Joan Huffman, Phil King, and Tan Parker

Summary
- Creates new criminal offenses for "obscene visual material" and possession or promotion of "obscene visual material" that appears to depict a child under age 18.
- Status: In force

Texas Senate Bill 20 (S.B. 20), also known as the "Stopping AI-Generated Child Pornography Act", is a 2025 law in the state of Texas that creates new criminal offenses for those who possess, promote, or view visual material deemed obscene, which is said to depict a child, whether it is an actual person, animated or cartoon depiction, or an image of someone created through computer software or artificial intelligence. It was passed by the Texas Legislature on May 28, 2025, unanimously in both chambers. It was signed into law by Governor Greg Abbott on June 20, 2025. It went into effect on September 1, 2025.

It was authored by Pete Flores and co-sponsored by Brent Hagenbuch, Juan Hinojosa, Joan Huffman, Phil King, and Tan Parker, as part of a package of legislation in the Texas House and Senate about A.I. and child pornography. Some supporters called it "common-sense" legislation falling within the "proper role" of government, protecting children and the "common good" within the state, with Heidi Ruiz, a police sergeant in Houston, describing the bill as "fantastic" and "fabulous."

The bill drew comparisons to language, within Texas state legislation, which aimed to institute state-level book bans. Critics described the law as unconstitutional, saying it violated the Free Speech Clause of the First Amendment which prohibits abridgement of freedom of speech and the press, including the legal precedent set in Ashcroft v. Free Speech Coalition. The Comic Book Legal Defense Fund vowed to support those wrongly accused under the law. Much of the controversy regarding S.B. 20 involves the broad language pertaining to "obscene" pornographic images as including A.I.-created, animated, and cartoon depictions, with some critics arguing it could have a chilling effect on anime, manga, graphic novels, and other media produced, distributed, or created within Texas.

== Provisions ==
S.B. 20 gives Texas police more provisions to restrict artificial intelligence-created child pornography, creating new criminal charge for possessing material depicting an underage person, under age 18, whether this child is an actual person or not. Those charged with this felony offense could go to state jail, but this could be elevated if the person charged has a prior conviction, of a $10,000 fine and two years in prison.

== Reactions ==
=== Support ===
Lieutenant Governor Dan Patrick applauded the unanimous passage of the law in the Texas Senate and called it "a priority" to protect children in Texas, and Texas citizens and thanked Pete Flores for his work on "this important issue". He later described the bill as part of the "bold, conservative agenda" that the Texas legislature passed during the 2025 legislative session. Phil King, one of the bill's co-sponsors, said that issue of child pornography had "infiltrated" the state's schools and said he was proud that the Texas legislature had "taken decisive action to protect our vulnerable Texans". Another co-sponsor of the legislation, Tan Parker described the law as "decisive action" to protect the children within Texas, and said he looked "forward to advancing this critical legislation" onward from the Texas Senate Criminal Justice Committee. He also described the legislation as "critical" action to protect the state's children from A.I.-generated child pornography and an "effective tool for law enforcement" to crack down on child porn perpetrators.

Other supporters, such as police, and prosecutors, called the legislation an "important step" to ensure that images generated with A.I., along with deepfakes, "can't be shared with impunity" and necessary to ensure children's protection. Flores told senators that technology which enabled the production of "offensive" material by child predators had "no redeeming value whatsoever" and asserted that the materials had often been "used to groom and abuse children". John Leigh, a co-founder of Anime Matsuri, one of the largest conventions for anime within Texas, reassured those who contacted him, saying that the law is not targeted at anime and manga fans, stated that he supported the legislation, describing it as a step "in the right direction," and said that he did not believe it would "negatively impact" anime or related art in the state. Also, State Representative Dade Phelan emphasized the legislation's urgency to deal with A.I. and child pornography, adding that they need to "put some guardrails on it to where the public is being taken care of".

The Texas Policy Research Foundation supported the legislation, saying that although it may lead to increased demands on state and local governmental resources, higher costs for local governments, and possible "civil liberty concerns" around online censorship, it represents a "necessary legal update" to address exploitation of children online, while "modernizing enforcement mechanisms" and recommended that lawmakers vote in favor of the law. Additionally, the group Texans for Fiscal Responsibility supported the law, arguing that it strengthened state law, upheld public safety, protected minors, and called it a "common-sense bill" protecting and promoting the "common good", children, and fell within the "proper role" of government. The Texas Public Policy Foundation also expressed their support for the law. A policy director for aforementioned conservative think tank, Zach Whiting, told the Texas Senate Committee on Criminal Justice, on March 4, 2025, that the foundation would assist legislators ans staff to "advance any and all measures to protect kids online" and shared an excerpt from a research paper about threats posed by A.I. in creating "sexually explicit deepfakes of children".

=== Opposition ===
Although the bill passed both chambers unanimously, there were some reports that the bill stalled due to opposition from Democratic lawmakers. Additionally, some individuals expressed concerns about the broad nature of the law's provisions. Anime Matsuri co-founder Deneice Leigh called for the law's wording to be clarified because "artists are anxious about displaying or selling fan art" even if the intention is "not be to penalize creators". She also described the bill as "vague and open to interpretation" as to what would be considered obscene and offensive while noting that the bill is not aiming to "target artists". Benjamin Napier, owner of Mansfield Comics and Manga in Mansfield, Texas, said that at first he felt the law was "ridiculous" and "kind of frivolous" at first, part of a "misguided puritanical onslaught", and noted that he would not cow "to the puritanical regime" if it was enacted. Kirsten Cather, an Asian Studies scholar at University of Texas, expressed concern at the law's misinterpretation because "many anime characters appear youthful, regardless of their actual age", said that the law could "stifle creative expression", and noted that the law's scope is broad enough to have manga and anime under scrutiny, a "real slippery slope here that's being breached".

Marcel Green of Screen Rant said that the law's ambiguity led to concerns from manga and anime fans, and theorized that the law's application to a fan within Texas, who downloaded the 368th chapter of My Hero Academia, which has a "sexualized depiction" of an "underage high school student", would result in a criminal offense of "180 days to two years in state jail, along with a fine of up to $10,000". Green also said the law is problematic because many anime and manga characters are young, with many protagonists as minors and argued that the law could apply in limited cases, if state officials deemed an anime or manga under scrutiny as lacking "artistic value". Evan D. Mullicane, on the same site, said the vague wording of the legislation made it "dangerous" for anime such as Dragon Ball and Naruto, and could impact more than hentai, predicting it will be used against more than its "intended target" and be used to censor stories with "young LGBTQIA characters". Another critic on the same site, Carlyle Edmundson, called for anime fans to step up and prevent the law's enactment "for the good of artists and fans everywhere", saying that the legislation was "draconian" and claimed it was the most extreme case of anime and manga censorship in U.S. history.

Nick Valdez of ComicBook.com said that the legislation could lead to censorship of "many anime and manga projects," like Kill la Kill and The 100 Girlfriends Who Really, Really, Really, Really, Really Love You, becoming a crime, and said that even if the law is enforced in a case-by-case basis, it could lead to a "much larger ban of materials in the state" itself due to the content of certain manga and anime. Vanessa Esguerra of The Mary Sue argued that possession of manga like Berserk and Vagabond, or viewing Dandadan, could be deemed illegal under the law, due to various parts of each of these media, and asserted that viewing and owning certain anime and other media, falling under the law's provisions, within Texas, might put "people behind the slammer". Victoria Luxford of NME said that the law's provisions could put various comics, games, and anime series at risk because many stories depict "underage characters in situations considered violent or otherwise inappropriate from a certain perspective". Zenko Kurishita, a Japanese free speech activist and politician, who served two terms as a member of the Tokyo Metropolitan Assembly, criticized the law on social media, saying that it was "nonsensical" to judge a character on "looking like" they were a minor. He also said there was "no guarantee that this censorship will reduce the number of real-life criminals", stated that it could have a chilling effect, with someone arrested, recommended not proposing similar laws elsewhere in the world, and said he would continue focusing on this issue with fans of Japanese media.

Other critics argued that the law's broad wording could inadvertently "criminalize certain forms" of anime, manga, video games, and artistic expression, leading to censorship of creative works. For instance, legal expert and Comic Book Legal Defense Fund Interim Executive Director Jeff Trexler was also critical of the law. He expressed worry that the legislation "may discourage people from engaging with specific titles, leading to unspoken censorship", guessed that the law may be aiming to "instill fear" rather than enforce it, and argued that the law allows for the "unconstitutional prosecution for possessing certain cartoons or animation". After the bill's passage, the Comic Book Legal Defense Fund noted, on social media, that the organization tried to make the bill "align with constitutional standards and to remove the comics reference" while working behind closed doors but that these amendments did not "work out."

== Impact ==
Prior to the law's enactment, it was reported in CBR that on August 30, 2025, JAST USA, a publisher of English-language versions of Japanese video games, specifically bishōjo games, dating sims, visual novels and Japanese RPGs, and J18 Publishing, the manga subdivision, were banned from the San Japan convention, on the convention's second day. Their products were said to be "too provocative" for the new "legal climate" in Texas. The official accounts of J18 Publishing and JAST USA confirmed this report, asserting that their literature was "too incisive" for Texas, ahead of "the anti-anime SB20 law going into effect on Monday." Jack Morgan of Texas Public Radio, at the convention, said there was a happy mood, but "chill in the air" because of the law, with mixed feelings of participants toward the new legislation.

On September 9, 2025, ValleyCentral reported that early issues of Dragon Ball had been pulled from the shelves of Kaboom Comics in Weslaco, Texas, by story manager Andrew Balderas because one of the protagonists, Goku, had been "shown naked as a child". Balderas told the publication that while this nudity was rare and done for "comedic effect," he was removing the issues as a precautionary action, and said he would remain vigilant about "what products are available and what materials customers request."

== See also ==
- Legal status of fictional pornography depicting minors
- Lolicon
- Shotacon
- United States v. Handley
