= Gamer's dilemma =

Ethical paradox in video games

The gamer's dilemma is an ethical paradox in the position commonly held by video game players (gamers) that virtual acts of murder, but not virtual sexual acts depicting children, in video games are morally justified because they do not directly affect people in real life. The concept was first coined in a 2009 paper by ethicist Morgan Luck published in the Ethics and Information Technology journal.

The dilemma is generally composed by the following arguments:

1. Gamers believe that virtual acts of murder, but not virtual sexual acts involving children, are morally permissible;
2. Gamers believe that virtual acts of murder are permissible because no real person can be directly affected by them;
3. But virtual sexual acts involving children are also unable to directly affect any real child;
4. There is no other meaningful distinction to morally differentiate those two acts;
5. Therefore, in order to be consistent, gamers must either hold that virtual acts of murder are unjustified, or that virtual sexual acts involving children are justified.

In order to answer the dilemma, one would need to dissolve it by undermining its underlying premises or resolve it by formulating a significant moral difference between the two acts. Some authors have reformulated their own versions of the gamer's dilemma, and the concept has been applied to a wider range of acts across media beyond just video games.

== History ==
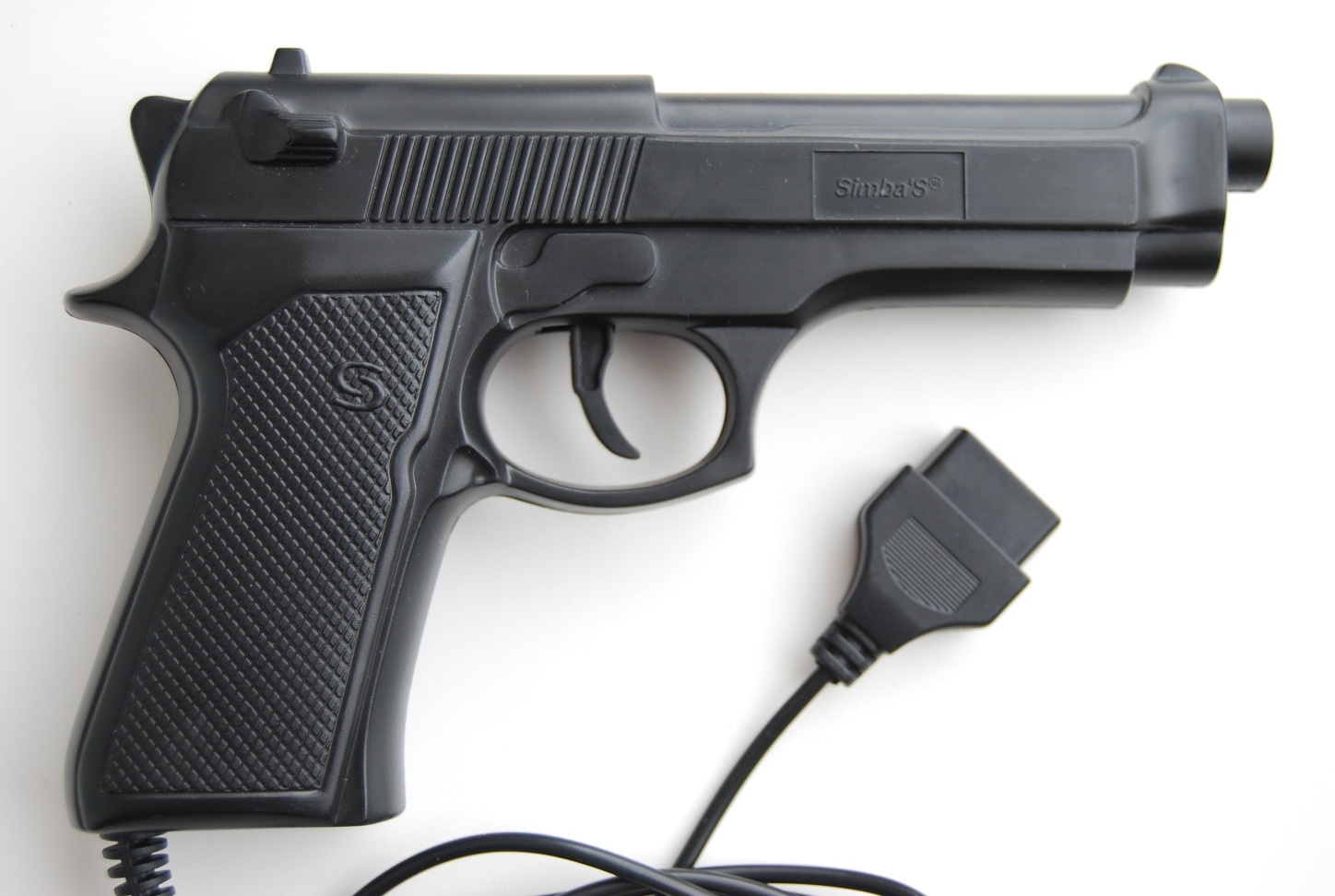
A light gun for console games

The view that actions that gamers carry out in video games, such as murder or rape, are subject to moral evaluation has been shared by a number of ethicists, including critics of games such as Call of Duty: Modern Warfare 2 (2009) and RapeLay (2006). They have often argued that such actions could cause real-world harm by leading gamers to commit crimes in the real world.

Other ethicists have argued that in-game actions are amoral. They have stated that criminal actions, such as attacking pedestrians in Grand Theft Auto games, do not harm people in the real world, and therefore are not subject to moral evaluation.

In 2009, Luck published a paper about what he named the gamer's dilemma, which argued that ethicists who believe that virtual murder is an amoral action should either adopt the view that virtual acts involving sex and children are also amoral, or to revisit their premise regarding virtual murder.

Multiple papers have been published in order to evaluate and answer the gamer's dilemma. Some authors have reformulated their own versions of the gamer's dilemma, and the concept has been applied to a wider range of acts across media beyond just video games.

== Formulation ==
The original gamer's dilemma can be described as resting on the following premises and leading to the conclusion:

1. Gamers believe that virtual acts of murder, but not virtual sexual acts involving children, are morally permissible;
2. Gamers believe that virtual acts of murder are permissible because no real person can be directly affected by them;
3. But virtual sexual acts involving children are also unable to directly affect any real child;
4. There is no other meaningful distinction to morally differentiate those two acts;
5. Therefore, in order to be consistent, gamers must either hold that virtual acts of murder are unjustified, or that virtual sexual acts involving children are justified.

In order to answer the dilemma, one would need to dissolve it by undermining its underlying premises or resolve it by formulating a significant moral difference between the two acts.

=== Narrow version ===
Academic literature has formulated a narrowed version of the gamer's dilemma, which accounts for two maximally similar contexts being given to both acts. It is defined as follows:

1. Gamers believe the premise that fictional acts of murder in video games are in some cases morally justified;
2. Gamers believe the premise that fictional sexual acts involving children in video games are in some cases morally unjustified;
3. Gamers cannot hold the premises in arguments 1 and 2 to be simultaneously true in the specific cases in which one act is morally justified and the other is not.

In order for the two acts to be contextualized in sufficiently similar cases, they must be depicted in maximally similar games of the same genre (or maximally similar genres), and with the same (or similar, to the highest reasonable extent) degrees of player agency, realism and other contextual features. As an example from academic literature, if a game, such as Counter-Strike, allows players to play as terrorists and murder adult hostages, then the same game should be compared to a similar version of itself that allows players to be terrorists and carry out sex acts with child hostages.

=== The Paradox of Fictionally Going Too Far ===
The Paradox of Fictionally Going Too Far is an expansion of the gamer's dilemma. It presents the same arguments, but applies to other types of media, such as films and literature.

== Proposed answers ==
The argument that gamers who play video games that include sexual acts with children are more likely to carry out those acts in real life than gamers who play games that include murder has sometimes been employed as an answer to the dilemma. This argument has been attacked on the basis that empirical research regarding the relationship between playing video games that contain murder or sexual activities involving children, and real-world unlawful activities, does not exist.

According to Luck, the argument that gamers engage in virtual murder not for the sake of committing virtual murder itself, but in order to advance in the game, is unsustainable because not all acts of virtual murder that gamers often engage in will advance a game's story. He also wrote that this argument could be undercut by a video game in which engaging in "virtual pedophilia" was necessary for a player to progress.

Ethicist Garry Young published Resolving the Gamer’s Dilemma in 2016. The book proposed a number of answers to the dilemma, as well as criticism of other possible answers. The Supreme Court of the United states held in a 2002 case that virtual child pornography could be considered protected speech if no real child was used in its production.

== See also ==
- Violence and videogames
- Paradox of fiction
- Trolley Problem
- Samaritan's dilemma
- No Russian
- The Coffin of Andy and Leyley, a video game that depicts an incestuous relationship
- Postal (franchise)
