= Child Pornography Prevention Act of 1996 =

1996 US legislation concerning child pornography; null and void since 2002

The Child Pornography Prevention Act of 1996 (CPPA) was a United States federal law to restrict child pornography on the internet, including virtual child pornography.

Before 1996, Congress defined child pornography with reference to the Ferber standard. In New York v. Ferber, 458 U.S. 747 (1982), the Supreme Court held that the government could restrict the distribution of child pornography to protect children from the child sexual abuse harm inherent in making it. In Osborne v. Ohio, 495 U.S. 103 (1990), the Ferber proscription was extended by the Court to the mere possession of child pornography.

The Child Pornography Prevention Act added two categories of speech to the definition of child pornography. The first prohibited "any visual depiction, including any photograph, film, video, picture, or computer-generated image or picture" that "is, or appears to be, of a minor engaging in sexually explicit conduct." In Ashcroft v. Free Speech Coalition, the Court observed that this provision "captures a range of depictions, sometimes called 'virtual child pornography,' which include computer-generated images, as well as images produced by more traditional means."

The second prohibited "any sexually explicit image that was advertised, promoted, presented, described, or distributed in such a manner that conveys the impression it depicts a minor engaging in sexually explicit conduct."

In the Ashcroft case in 2002, the Supreme Court struck down CPPA as a violation of the First Amendment for being too broad.

== See also ==
- PROTECT Act of 2003
