= Reza Banakar =

Iranian academic

Reza Banakar (1959 – 27 August 2020) was an Iranian-born Professor of Legal Sociology at Lund University, Sweden. Before joining Lund in 2013, he was Professor of Socio-Legal Studies at the Department of Advanced Legal Studies at the University of Westminster, London.

== Biography ==
He studied law, sociology and philosophy at Lund University, where he also obtained his doctorate in the sociology of law and taught various socio-legal subjects between 1988 and 1997. In 1997, he moved to the University of Oxford to take up the Paul Dodyk Research Fellowship at the Centre for Socio-Legal Studies (then based at Wolfson College).

Between 2002 and 2013, he worked at the School of Law at the University of Westminster. His research is within the areas of law and social theory, socio-legal methodology, legal cultures, ethnic discrimination, law and literature, and rights. Among his publications are Merging Law and Sociology: Beyond the Dichotomies in Socio-Legal Research (Berlin/Wisconsin, Galda & Wilch, 2003) and Theory and Method in Socio-Legal Research, co-edited with Max Travers (Oxford, Hart, 2005). An edited collection entitled Rights in Context: Law and Justice in Late Modern Society, was published by Ashgate in 2010.

In February 2013, he assumed the Chair in Legal Sociology at Lund University, Sweden. Reza Banakar died on 27 August 2020.

== Main publications ==
- 2016 Driving Culture in Iran: Law and Society on the Roads of the Islamic Republic. London: I.B.Tauris
- 2015 Normativity in Legal Sociology: Methodological Reflections on Law and Regulation in Late Modernity. Springer International.
- 2013 Law and Social Theory (co-edited with Max Travers). Hart Publishing, Oxford.
- 2010 Rights in Context: Law and Justice in Late Modern Society (edited collection ). Aldershot, Ashgate, August 2010.
- 2005 Theory and Method in Socio-Legal Research. Co-editor Max Travers. Hart Publishing: Oxford. .
- 2003 Merging Law and Sociology: Beyond the Dichotomies of Socio-Legal Research. Galda and Wilch Publishing: Berlin/Wisconsin.ISBN 1-931255-13-X and ISBN 3-931397-47-5.
- 2002 An Introduction to Law and Social Theory. Co-editor Max Travers. Hart Publishing: Oxford.
- 1998 Doorkeepers of the Law: A Socio-Legal Study of Ethnic Discrimination in Sweden. Aldershot: Dartmouth/Ashgate. https://www.ashgate.com/ . ISBN 1-84014-485-8.
- 1994 The Dilemma of Law - Conflict Management in a Multicultural Society. (Swedish title: Rättens Dilemma: Om konflikthantering i ett mångkulturellt samhälle) Bokbox Publishing: Lund/Sweden. Publisher’s home page: https://web.archive.org/web/20110505173925/http://www.infografen.com/bokbox/alphalist.html . ISBN 91-86980-15-7

== Recent papers ==
- 2019, “Brexit: A Note on EU’s Interlegality.” In Bettina Lemann Kristiansen et al (eds.) Transnationalisation and Legal Actors: Legitimacy in Question. London: Routledge.
- 2018, “Law, Love and Responsibility: A Note on Solidarity in EU Law” in Festskrift till Håkan Hydén, Lund: Juristförlaget, 69-83.
- 2018, "The Life of the Law in the Islamic Republic of Iran" (Coauthor Ziaee Keyvan) in 51 (5) Iranian Studies. Open access at .
- 2018, "Double-Thinking and Contradictory Arrangements in Iranian Law and Society" in Digest of Middle East Studies.
- 2014, “Law, Community and the 2011 London Riots” (Co-authored with Alexandra Lort Phillips) in D. Schiff and R. Nobel (eds) Law, Society and Community: Socio-Legal Essays in Honour of Roger Cotterrell. Farnham, Ashgate.
- 2013, “Law and Regulation in Late Modernity” in R. Banakar and M. Travers (eds) Law and Social Theory (Oxford: Hart).
- 2013, “Who Needs the Classics? On the Relevance of Classical Legal Sociology for the Study of Current Social and Legal Problems”. In Hammerslev, Ole and Madsen, Mikael Rask (eds.) Retssociologi (Copenhagen: Hans Reitzels Forlag).
- 2010, “In Search of Heimat: A Note on Franz Kafka’s Concept of Law” forthcoming in Law and Literature 2010.
- 2009, “Power, Culture and Method in Comparative Law” in 5/1 International Journal of Law in Context pp. 69–85.
- 2008, “Poetic Injustice: A Case Study of the UK’s Anti-Terrorism Legislation” in 3/122 Retfærd: The Nordic Journal of Law and Justice. pp. 69–90.
- 2008, “The Politics of Legal Cultures” in 53 Scandinavian Studies in Law 2008, pp. 151–175. A shorter Version of this paper is published in 4/122 Retfærd: The Nordic Journal of Law and Justice).
- 2008, “Whose Experience is the Measure of Justice” in 11 Legal Ethics pp. 209–222.
- 2008, "Law Through Sociology’s Looking Glass: Conflict and Competition in Sociological Studies of Law in Denis, Ann and Kalekin-Fishman, Devorah (eds.) The New ISA Handbook in Contemporary International Sociology: Conflict, Competition, Cooperation, London, Sage.

electronic copies of his recent published research papers are available (and maybe downloaded) at: here.
