= New York v. Ferber =

1982 US Supreme Court case that upheld criminalization of child pornography

- Supreme Court of the United States

Argued April 27, 1982 Decided July 2, 1982
- Full case name: New York, Petitioner v. Paul Ira Ferber
- Citations: 458 U.S. 747 (more) 102 S. Ct. 3348; 73 L. Ed. 2d 1113; 1982 U.S. LEXIS 12; 50 U.S.L.W. 5077; 8 Media L. Rep. 1809
- Argument: Oral argument

Case history
- Prior: Defendant convicted at trial; conviction upheld by Appellate Division of the New York State Supreme Court. 74 App. Div. 2d 558, 424 N. Y. S. 2d 967 (1980); reversed by New York Court of Appeals, 52 N.Y.2d, at 681, 422 N.E.2d; cert. granted, 452 U.S. 1052 (1982).
- Subsequent: Conviction affirmed

Holding
- State interest in protecting children allows laws prohibiting distribution of images of sexual performances by minors even where content does not meet tests of obscenity.

Court membership
- Chief Justice Warren E. Burger Associate Justices William J. Brennan Jr. · Byron White; Thurgood Marshall · Harry Blackmun; Lewis F. Powell Jr. · William Rehnquist; John P. Stevens · Sandra Day O'Connor

Case opinions
- Majority: White, joined by Burger, Powell, Rehnquist, O'Connor
- Concurrence: O'Connor
- Concurrence: Brennan (in judgment), joined by Marshall
- Concurrence: Blackmun (in result)
- Concurrence: Stevens (in judgment)

Laws applied
- U.S. Const. amend. I

New York v. Ferber, 458 U.S. 747 (1982), is a landmark decision of the U.S Supreme Court, unanimously ruling that the First Amendment to the United States Constitution did not protect the sale or manufacture of child sexual abuse material (also known as child pornography) and that states could outlaw it.

== Procedural background ==
New York had an obscenity law that made it illegal for an individual to "promote any performance which includes sexual conduct by a child less than sixteen years of age." Paul Ferber, an owner of an adult bookstore in Manhattan, was charged under the law after he sold an undercover police officer two films depicting young boys masturbating. He was charged with promoting both obscene sexual performances and indecent sexual performances. At trial, he was acquitted of the obscene sexual performance count but he was convicted of the indecent sexual performance count, and the conviction was affirmed by the intermediate appellate court. The New York Court of Appeals overturned the conviction, finding the obscenity law unconstitutional under the First Amendment because the law was both underinclusive as to other films of dangerous activity, and overbroad as to its application to materials produced out-of-state and non-obscene materials.

== Supreme Court's decision ==
The Court upheld the constitutionality of New York's obscenity law, ruling that it did not violate the First Amendment, and reversed and remanded the case.

For a long time before the decision, the Court had ruled that the First Amendment allowed the regulation of obscenity. Under the Court's previous decision in Miller v. California, 413 U.S. 15 (1973), material is "obscene" if, taken as a whole and applying contemporary community standards, it lacks serious scientific, literary, artistic, or political value, is "patently offensive" and aimed at "prurient interests". The court in Ferber found that child pornography, however, may be banned without first being deemed obscene under Miller for five reasons:

1. The government has a very compelling interest in preventing the sexual exploitation of children.
2. Distribution of visual depictions of children engaged in sexual activity is intrinsically related to the sexual abuse of children. The images serve as a permanent reminder of the abuse, and it is necessary for government to regulate the channels of distributing such images if it is to be able to eliminate the production of child pornography.
3. Advertising and selling child pornography provides an economic motive for producing child pornography.
4. Visual depictions of children engaged in sexual activity have negligible artistic value.
5. Thus, holding that child pornography is outside the protection of the First Amendment is consistent with the Court's prior decisions limiting the banning of materials deemed "obscene" as the Court had previously defined it. For this reason, child pornography need not be legally obscene before being outlawed.

== See also ==
- Ashcroft v. Free Speech Coalition, 535 U.S. 234 (2002), which ruled that certain provisions of the Child Pornography Prevention Act of 1996 were unconstitutional.
- PROTECT Act of 2003, part of which superseded the Ashcroft decision to make the relevant statute conform with the Miller test.
- List of United States Supreme Court cases, volume 458
- Legal status of fictional child pornography
