= PROTECT Act of 2003 =

United States law regarding child abuse and violent crimes against children

The PROTECT Act of 2003 (Pub. L. 108–21 (text) (PDF), 117 Stat. 650, S. 151, enacted April 30, 2003) is a United States law with the stated intent of preventing child abuse as well as investigating and prosecuting violent crimes against children. "PROTECT" is a backronym which stands for "Prosecutorial Remedies and Other Tools to End the Exploitation of Children Today".

The PROTECT Act incorporates the Truth in Domain Names Act (TDNA) of 2003 (originally two separate bills, submitted by Senator Orrin Hatch and Congressman Mike Pence), codified at 18 U.S.C. § 2252(B)(b).

== Overview ==
The law has the following effects:

- Provides for mandatory life imprisonment of sex offenders convicted of sex offenses against a minor if the offender has had a prior conviction of abuse against a minor, with some exceptions.
- Establishes a program to obtain criminal history background checks for volunteer organizations.
- Authorizes wiretapping and monitoring of other communications in all cases related to child abuse or kidnapping.
- Eliminates statutes of limitations for child abduction or child abuse.
- Bars pretrial release of persons charged with specified offenses against or involving children.
- Assigns a national Amber alert coordinator.
- Implemented Suzanne's Law. Named after Suzanne Lyall, a 19-year-old college student at the University at Albany who disappeared in 1998, the law eliminates waiting periods before law enforcement agencies will investigate reports of missing adults ages 18–21. These reports are also filed with the NCIC.
- Prohibits computer-generated child pornography when "(B) such visual depiction is a computer image or computer-generated image that is, or appears virtually indistinguishable from that of a minor engaging in sexually explicit conduct"; (as amended by 1466A for Section 2256(8)(B) of title 18, United States Code).
- Prohibits drawings, sculptures, and pictures of such drawings and sculptures depicting minors in actions or situations that meet the Miller test of being obscene, or depicting minors who are engaged in sex acts that are deemed obscene under an alternate test that removes the "community standards" prong of the Miller test. The law does not explicitly state that images of fictional beings who appear to be under 18 engaged in sexual acts that are not deemed to be obscene are rendered illegal in and of their own condition (illustration of sex of fictional minors).
- Minimum sentence of 5 years for possession, 10 years for distribution.
- Under Sec. 105, authorizes fines and/or imprisonment for up to 30 years for U.S. citizens or legal residents who engage in illicit sexual conduct abroad. Illicit sexual conduct means a sexual act (as defined in section 2246) with a person under 18 years of age or any commercial sex act (as defined in section 1591) with a person under 18 years of age.
- Incorporated other proposed legislation existing at the time as:
  - the Code Adam Act of 2003, (Title III, Subtitle D)
  - the Truth in Domain Names proposed language (Title V, Subtitle B)
  - the Secure Authentication Feature and Enhanced Identification Defense Act of 2003, also cited as the SAFE ID Act, (Title VI, Section 607.)
  - the Illicit Drug Anti-Proliferation Act of 2003 (Title VI, Section 608.)

The PROTECT Act mandated that the United States Attorney General promulgate new regulations to enforce section 2257 of title 18, United States Code, colloquially known as the "2257 Regulations".

The PROTECT Act includes prohibitions against obscene illustrations depicting child pornography, including computer-generated illustrations, also known as virtual child pornography. Previous provisions outlawing virtual child pornography in the Child Pornography Prevention Act of 1996 had been ruled unconstitutional by the U.S. Supreme Court in its 2002 decision, Ashcroft v. Free Speech Coalition. The PROTECT ACT attached an obscenity requirement under the Miller test or the variant test noted above to overcome this limitation.

The PROTECT Act allows sex offenders to be sentenced to a lifetime term of federal supervised release. Although targeted most directly at sex offenders, the PROTECT Act affects all federal supervised releasees. The PROTECT Act removed the "aggregation requirement" of 18 U.S.C. § 3583(e)(3) and 18 U.S.C. § 3583(h), which had limited the net amount of imprisonment that a sentencing court could impose for supervised release violations.

The act was signed into law by President George W. Bush on April 30, 2003.

== Legislative history ==
Following the Supreme Court's decision in Ashcroft v. Free Speech Coalition, Congress started working on a bill to address the court's concerns almost immediately. That same day, Representative Mark Foley stated that "The high court sided with pedophiles over children." The earliest known mention of the decision comes from April 17, 2002, in the Congressional Record, one day after the court's decision by Rep. Foley. This was followed by numerous other remarks over the next few days.

=== H.R. 4623 and S. 2511 (107th Congress) ===
The Child Obscenity and Pornography Prevention Act of 2002, H.R. 4623, was introduced by Rep. Lamar Smith on April 30, 2002, and referred to the House Committee on the Judiciary that same day. The bill passed the House by a vote of 413 - 8 on a motion to suspend the rules (1 representative voted present). It was received in the Senate the following day and committee hearings by the Senate Judiciary Committee were held on October 2; no report was issued, and the bill did not pass the Senate. A similar bill, S. 2511, was introduced in the Senate on May 14, 2002, and was likewise referred to the Judiciary Committee.

Both S. 2511 and H.R. 4623 expired at the end of the 107th Congress.

== Application of the act ==
=== Appellate Court ===
On April 6, 2006, in United States v. Williams, the Eleventh Circuit Court of Appeals ruled that one component of the PROTECT Act, the "pandering provision" codified at 18 U.S.C. § 2252A(a)(3)(B) of the United States Code, violated the First Amendment. The "pandering provision" conferred criminal liability on anyone who knowingly

advertises, promotes, presents, distributes, or solicits through the mails, or in interstate or foreign commerce by any means, including by computer, any material or purported material in a manner that reflects the belief, or that is intended to cause another to believe, that the material or purported material is, or contains (i) an obscene visual depiction of a minor engaging in sexually explicit conduct; or (ii) a visual depiction of an actual minor engaging in sexually explicit conduct.

The Williams court held that although the content described in subsections (i) and (ii) is not constitutionally protected, speech that advertises or promotes such content does have the protection of the First Amendment. Based on this determination, the court held § 2252A(a)(3)(B) to be unconstitutionally overbroad. The Eleventh Circuit further stated that the law was unconstitutionally vague, in that it did not adequately and specifically describe what sort of speech was criminally actionable.

=== Supreme Court cases ===
The Department of Justice appealed the Eleventh Circuit's ruling to the U.S. Supreme Court. In its May 2008 decision in United States v. Williams, the Supreme Court reversed the Eleventh Circuit's ruling and upheld this portion of the act. However, the court did not reverse its holding in Ashcroft v. Free Speech Coalition as to virtual child pornography which is not obscene under the Miller standard.

In July 2024, R. Kelly asked the Supreme Court to overturn his criminal convictions because he is using the statute of limitations as an affirmative defense. Kelly says that the crimes occurred in the 1990s which punishes him retroactively.

=== Convictions ===
The first conviction of a person found to have violated the sections of the act relating to virtual child pornography was Dwight Whorley of Virginia, who used computers at the Virginia Employment Commission to download "Japanese anime style cartoons of children engaged in explicit sexual conduct with adults" alleged to depict "children engaged in explicit sexual conduct with adults". He was charged with 19 counts of "knowingly receiving" child pornography for printing out two cartoons and viewing others. His conviction was upheld in a 2–1 panel decision of the Fourth Circuit Court of Appeals in December 2008. This decision was consistent with the U.S. Supreme Court ruling in Ashcroft v. Free Speech Coalition in which the Supreme Court held that virtual child pornography was protected free speech, provided that the virtual depictions are not obscene. Obscenity, including obscene depictions of children, either virtual or real, is unprotected speech. (Whorley was also previously convicted of other child sexual abuse related offenses.)

Also in 2008, Christopher Handley, a "prolific collector" of manga, pleaded guilty to charges related to the PROTECT Act, in exchange for a six-month plea deal, five years of probation, and forfeiture of his collection of manga and anime that had been seized by police. He was facing a maximum sentence of up to twenty years. While not convicted by a jury, he was the first person charged under the PROTECT Act for the lone act of possessing art deemed obscene, in the form of seven manga graphic novels ordered from Japan. In the case United States v. Handley, district court Judge James E. Gritzner ruled that two parts of the PROTECT Act that criminalized certain depictions without having to go through the Miller test were overbroad and thus unconstitutional. Handley still faces an obscenity charge. A later ruling in United States v. Dean challenged the Handley overbreadth ruling because the Handley ruling did not prove that the sections had "substantial overbreadth".

=== Criticism ===
According to Adler, Delohery, and Charles Brownstein, "the current law raises concerns for creators, publishers, and collectors of various forms of entertainment (including, but not limited to, comics/manga, video games, and fine art)." Bell argues that the PROTECT Act should be reexamined by Congress because it infringes on the First Amendment's right to free expression.

== See also ==
- Laws regarding child pornography
- Child pornography laws in the United States
- Legal status of drawn pornography depicting minors
- Child abduction scare of 2002
