= Child pornography =

Erotic materials depicting minors

Child pornography (CP), also known as child sexual abuse material (CSAM), is erotic material that involves or depicts persons under the local age of majority or age of consent. The precise characteristics of what constitutes child pornography vary by criminal jurisdiction.

Child pornography is often produced through online solicitation, coercion, and covert photography. Sexual abuse (such as statutory rape or forcible rape) is mainly involved during its production. Pornographic pictures of minors are also often produced by children and teenagers without the involvement of an adult. CSAM images and videos are frequently collected and shared online.

Laws regarding child pornography generally include sexual images involving minors and computer-generated images that appear to involve them. Most individuals arrested for possessing child pornography are found to have images of prepubescent children. Those who possess pornographic images of post-pubescent minors are less likely to be prosecuted, even though such images also fall within the scope of the statutes.

Child pornography is illegal and censored in most jurisdictions. Ninety-four Interpol member states had laws specifically addressing child pornography as of 2008, not including nations that ban all pornography.

== Terms and definitions ==
The precise definition of the term "child pornography" varies by jurisdictions and there is no consensus in international law regarding the precise meaning of the term.

In the United States, the U.S. Supreme Court has defined child pornography as material that "visually depicts sexual conduct by children below a specified age" (see New York v. Ferber). In Canada, child pornography can also entail depictions of fictional minors. In the United Kingdom, the law does not use the term "child pornography", though it does define a series of illegal sexual materials that are commonly regarded as child pornography. Some English jurisdictions use the COPINE scale to sort potentially sexual media involving minors.

In the 2000s, use of the term "child abuse images" increased by both scholars and law enforcement personnel because the term "pornography" can carry the inaccurate implication of consent and create distance from the abusive nature of the material. A similar term, "child sexual abuse material", is used by some official bodies, and similar terms such as "child abuse material", "documented child sexual abuse", and "depicted child sexual abuse" are also used, as are the acronyms "CAM" and "CAI". The term "child pornography" retains its legal definitions in various jurisdictions, along with related terms such as "indecent photographs of a child" and others. In 2008, the World Congress III against the Sexual Exploitation of Children and Adolescents stated in their formally adopted pact that "Increasingly the term 'child abuse images' is being used to refer to the sexual exploitation of children and adolescents in pornography. This is to reflect the seriousness of the phenomenon and to emphasize that pornographic images of children are in fact records of a crime being committed."

== Production ==
The methods of creating child pornography vary; some forms involve coaxing, seduction, or coercion. Other erotic images depicting childhood nudity involve covert filming and surveillance. Violent "hands-on" offenses (such as forcible rape) are rare in criminal cases of child pornography production; instead, most of such cases involve online solicitation, the exchange of gifts, and promises of romance. In many cases, minors produce child pornography by themselves without the participation of adults.

In April 2018, The Daily Telegraph reported that of the sexually explicit images of children and teenagers (11 to 15 year-olds) found on the internet, 31 percent were made by children or teenagers from November 2017 to February 2018, with 40 percent in December 2017; 349 cases in January 2017 and 1717 in January 2018. The images were made by children or teenagers photographing or filming each other or as selfies, without adults present or coercing, by unwittingly imitating adult pornographic or nude images or videos (including of celebrities) that they had found on the Internet. The report said that sex offenders trawled for and amassed such images.

A 2007 study in Ireland, undertaken by the Garda Síochána, revealed the most serious content in a sample of over 100 cases involving indecent images of children. In 44 percent of cases, the most serious images depicted nudity or erotic posing, in 7 percent they depicted sexual activity between children, in 7 percent they depicted non-penetrative sexual activity between adults and children, in 37% they depicted penetrative sexual activity between adults and children, and in 5% they depicted sadism or bestiality. A 2012 study reported that, in a sample of child pornography production arrest cases from 2009, 37 percent of the reviewed material was adult-produced and 39 percent was produced by minors with some involvement of an adult; the remaining items were produced by minors only.

=== Artificially generated or simulated imagery ===
Simulated child pornography produced without the direct involvement of children in the production process itself includes modified photographs of real children, non-minor teenagers made to look younger (de-aging), deepfake pornography, fully computer-generated imagery, and adults made to look like children.

=== Sexting and filming among minors ===
Sexting is sending, receiving, or forwarding sexually explicit messages, photographs, or images, primarily between mobile phones, of oneself to others (such as dating partners or friends). It may also include the use of a computer or any other digital device. Such images may be passed along to others or posted on the Internet. In many jurisdictions, the age of consent is lower than the age of majority, and a minor who is over the age of consent can legally have sex with a person of the same age. Many laws on child pornography were passed before cell phone cameras became common among teenagers close in age to or over the age of consent and sexting was understood as a phenomenon. Teenagers who can legally consent to sex, but are under the age of majority, can be charged with production and distribution of child pornography if they send naked images of themselves to friends or sex partners of the same age. The University of New Hampshire's Crimes Against Children Research Center estimates that 7 percent of people arrested on suspicion of child pornography production in 2009 were teenagers who shared images with peers consensually. Such arrests also include teenage couples or friends with a small age disparity, where one is a legal adult and the other is not. In some countries, mandatory sentencing requires anybody convicted of such an offense to be placed on a sex offender registry.

Legal professionals and academics have criticized the use of child pornography laws with mandatory punishments against teenagers over the age of consent for sex offenses. Florida cybercrimes defense attorney David S. Seltzer wrote of this that "I do not believe that our child pornography laws were designed for these situations ... A conviction for possession of child pornography in Florida draws up to five years in prison for each picture or video, plus a lifelong requirement to register as a sex offender."

In a 2013 interview, assistant professor of communications at the University of Colorado Denver, Amy Adele Hasinoff, who studies the repercussions of sexting has stated that the "very harsh" child pornography laws are "designed to address adults exploiting children" and should not replace better sex education and consent training for teens. She went on to say, "Sexting is a sex act, and if it's consensual, that's fine ... Anyone who distributes these pictures without consent is doing something malicious and abusive, but child pornography laws are too harsh to address it."

==== Cybersex trafficking ====
Child victims of cybersex trafficking are forced into live streaming, pornographic exploitation on webcam which can be recorded and later sold. Victims are raped by traffickers or coerced to perform sex acts on themselves or other children while being filmed and broadcast in real time. They are frequently forced to watch the paying consumers on shared screens and follow their orders. It occurs in 'cybersex dens', which are rooms equipped with webcams. Overseas predators and pedophiles seek out and pay to watch the victims.

== Distribution and receipt ==
Philip Jenkins notes that there is "overwhelming evidence that [child pornography] is all but impossible to obtain through nonelectronic means." The Internet has radically changed how child pornography is reproduced and disseminated, and, according to the United States Department of Justice, resulted in a massive increase in the "availability, accessibility, and volume of child pornography."

Digital cameras and Internet distribution facilitated by the use of credit cards and the ease of transferring images across national borders has made it easier than ever before for users of child pornography to obtain the photographs and videos.

In 2019, The New York Times reported that child pornography was now a crisis. Tech companies such as Facebook, Microsoft, and Dropbox reported over 18 million cases of child sexual abuse material, which includes over 45 million images and videos.

In 2023, the National Center for Missing & Exploited Children's CyberTipline received 36.2 million reports of suspected child sexual exploitation, an increase of 12% from 2022.

== Offender characteristics ==
Child pornography offenders are predominantly white, male, aged between 25 and 50 years and, in relation to "hands on" child sex abusers, more likely to be employed. On multiple studies, they have been reported to have higher education at a rate of 30%. Research has also shown that around 50% of child pornography offenders were single either at the time of their offences or after they were prosecuted. Child pornography offenders are also less likely to be parents compared to contact offenders. Scholars have also found that while "hands-on" offenders are relatively likely to transition into pornography offenders (with some admitting to using child pornography as a substitute for committing contact offenses), the opposite is rarely the case.

In a study conducted by Michael Seto in 2010, 33–50% of a sample of child pornography offenders reported having sexual interest in children. Another 2009 study diagnosed 31% of its sample of online child sex offenders with pedophilia. Aside from a predominant sexual interest in children, other reasons for online child pornography offending include indiscriminate sexual interest, pornography addiction, and accidental access to child pornography material. Having a history of child pornography offending has been stated by some researchers to be a valid diagnostic indicator of pedophilia.

A meta-analysis of nine studies conducted by Seto in 2011 reported a sexual recidivism rate of 5% for follow-up periods ranging from one to six years. Another paper published by Seto in 2015 reported a sexual recidivism rate of 11% in a 5-year follow-up period. Research has also shown that offenders that measure high on antisociality and atypical sexual interests are most likely to sexually reoffend. Other studies have also reported rates of recidivism for child pornography offenders that are inferior to those of contact child sex offenders. People who have committed both pornography and contact offences have a higher recidivism rate for contact offences than child pornography offenders.

== Relation to child molestation ==
Experts differ over any causal link between child pornography and child sexual abuse, with some experts saying that it increases the risk of child sexual abuse, and others saying that use of child pornography reduces the risk of offending. A 2008 American review of the use of Internet communication to lure children outlines the possible links to actual behaviour regarding the effects of Internet child pornography.

According to one paper from the Mayo Clinic based on case reports of those under treatment, 30% to 80% of individuals who viewed child pornography and 76% of individuals who were arrested for Internet child pornography had molested a child. As the total number of those who view such images cannot be ascertained, the ratio of passive viewing to molestation remains unknown. The report also notes that it is difficult to define the progression from computerized child pornography to physical acts against children. Several professors of psychology state that memories of child abuse are maintained as long as visual records exist, are accessed, and are "exploited perversely."

A study by Wolak, Finkelhor, and Mitchell states that:

[R]ates of child sexual abuse have declined substantially since the mid-1990s, a time period that corresponds to the spread of CP online. ... The fact that this trend is revealed in multiple sources tends to undermine arguments that it is because of reduced reporting or changes in investigatory or statistical procedures. ... [T]o date, there has not been a spike in the rate of child sexual abuse that corresponds with the apparent expansion of online CP.

== Ethics ==
The study of the ethics regarding child pornography has been greatly neglected among academics. Feminist writer Susan Cole has argued that the absence of ethical literature regarding the topic can be explained by the simplicity of the matter, given that "there [is] a general consensus about the harm involved" in this type of material.

Some scholars have argued that the possession of child pornography is immoral because it would validate the act of child sexual abuse or actively encourage people to engage in child molestation. In a 1984 study involving 51 child sexual abusers, 67% of the sample reported making use of "hardcore sexual stimuli". However, the study failed to prove that there was a causal relationship between such type of pornography usage and child sexual abuse. Other similar studies have also found a correlation between child molestation and usage of extreme erotic materials, but they did not limit the definition of "pornography" or "hardcore sexual stimuli" to child pornography.

Some judges have argued that child pornography usage fuels a marketplace of child sexual abuse material, thus creating a financial incentive for its production. Such stance could be challenged by Anne Higonnet's contention that there is no evidence of a commercially profitable market of child pornography. However, the argument could still be held true if it is proven that those who produce child pornography do so not because of a potential financial benefit, but because they expect others to view the material that they produce.

Judith Butler stated in 1990 that, in light of the new 20th century laws regarding child pornography, the very act of speaking of child pornography has intensified its erotic effect, leading to an "eroticization of prohibition". Another idea relating to the ethics of child pornography states that allowing such materials would lead to children being seen as sexual objects, thus potentially leading adults to commit child sexual abuse.

=== The Gamer's Dilemma ===
The Gamer's Dilemma, conceptualized by researcher Morgan Luck in a 2009 essay, is a moral challenge that contrasts the societal acceptance of acts of virtual murder in video games and the simultaneous condemnation of virtual acts of child molestation in virtual environments (including in computer-generated child pornography). According to Luck, there is no sound justification for making a distinction between the two actions, and the arguments against virtual acts of child sexual abuse are also valid for virtual acts of murder. Therefore, if both acts are immoral, then they should both be rejected about equally (especially by scholars, such as ethicists).

Ethicists have devised two main types of answers to the Gamer's Dilemma:

- The first type attempts to solve the challenge by highlighting the moral differences between virtual acts of child sexual abuse and murder, thus concluding that virtual acts of child molestation are often immoral, while simulated acts of murder often are not.
- The second attempts to undermine Luck's challenge by biting the bullet through either denying that virtual acts of murder are morally permissible, or that virtual acts of child molestation are morally impermissible.

A study published in 2023 suggested that most of its participants reacted negatively both to depictions of virtual murder and sexual abuse, with sexual abuse triggering significantly more negative reactions than murder. Further, Luck's 2023 follow-up article reframes the concept of her Dilemma as "the paradox of treating wrongdoing lightly", to further refine the Gamer's problem.

== Laws ==
=== International coordination of law enforcement ===
One of the primary mandates of the international policing organization Interpol is the prevention of crimes against children involving the crossing of international borders, including child pornography and all other forms of exploitation and trafficking of children.

=== National and international law ===
Child pornography laws provide severe penalties for producers and distributors in almost all societies, usually including incarceration, with shorter duration of sentences for non-commercial distribution depending on the extent and content of the material distributed. Convictions for possessing child pornography also usually include prison sentences, but those sentences are often converted to probation for first-time offenders.

In 2006, the International Centre for Missing & Exploited Children (ICMEC) published a report of findings on the presence of child pornography legislation in the then-184 Interpol member countries. It later updated this information, in subsequent editions, to include 196 UN member countries. The report, entitled "Child Pornography: Model Legislation & Global Review", assesses whether national legislation:

(1) exists with specific regard to child pornography; (2) provides a definition of child pornography; (3) expressly criminalizes computer-facilitated offenses; (4) criminalizes the knowing possession of child pornography, regardless of intent to distribute; and (5) requires ISPs to report suspected child pornography to law enforcement or to some other mandated agency.

ICMEC stated that it found in its initial report that only 27 countries had legislation needed to deal with child pornography offenses, while 95 countries did not have any legislation that specifically addressed child pornography, making child pornography a global issue worsened by the inadequacies of domestic legislation. The 7th Edition Report found that still only 69 countries had legislation needed to deal with child pornography offenses, while 53 did not have any legislation specifically addressing the problem. Over seven years of research from 2006 to 2012, ICMEC and its Koons Family Institute on International Law and Policy report that they have worked with 100 countries that have revised or put in place new child pornography laws.

A 2008 review of child pornography laws in 187 countries by the International Centre for Missing & Exploited Children (ICMEC) showed that 93 had no laws that specifically addressed child pornography. Of the 94 that did, 36 did not criminalize possession of child pornography regardless of intent to distribute. This review, however, did not count legislation outlawing all pornography as being "specific" to child pornography. It also did not count bans on "the worst forms of child labor". Some societies such as Canada and Australia have laws banning cartoon, manga, or written child pornography and others require Internet service providers (ISPs) to monitor internet traffic to detect it.

The United Nations Optional Protocol on the Sale of Children, Child Prostitution and Child Pornography requires parties to outlaw the "producing, distributing, disseminating, importing, exporting, offering, selling or possessing for the above purposes" of child pornography. The Council of Europe's Cybercrime Convention and the EU Framework Decision that became active in 2006 require signatory or member states to criminalize all aspects of child pornography.

== In popular culture ==
A photograph of a bag placed on a Supreme Court document concerning the child pornography case United States v. Williams (2008) appeared in the Balenciaga "Garde-Robe" campaign in November 2022. This campaign coincided with another Balenciaga advertisement featuring six children holding teddy bears dressed in bondage and BDSM gear, surrounded by empty wine glasses and champagne flutes. Five days later, Balenciaga removed both campaigns and apologized.

== See also ==
- Child erotica
- Child prostitution
- Commercial sexual exploitation of children
- Debate regarding child pornography laws
- Depictions of youth
- Children as subjects
- Legal status of fictional pornography depicting minors
- Lolicon / Shotacon
- Mobile Alliance Against Child Sexual Abuse Content
- Prevention Project Dunkelfeld
- Protect (political organization)
- Relationship between child pornography and child sexual abuse
- Virtuous Pedophiles
