= Ashcroft v. Free Speech Coalition =

- Supreme Court of the United States

Argued October 30, 2001 Decided April 16, 2002
- Full case name: John David Ashcroft, Attorney General, et al., Petitioners v. The Free Speech Coalition, et al.
- Docket no.: 00-795
- Citations: 535 U.S. 234 (more) 122 S. Ct. 1389; 152 L. Ed. 2d 403; 2002 U.S. LEXIS 2789; 70 U.S.L.W. 4237; 30 Media L. Rep. 1673; 2002 Cal. Daily Op. Service 3211; 2002 Daily Journal DAR 4033; 15 Fla. L. Weekly Fed. S 187
- Argument: Oral argument

Case history
- Prior: Free Speech Coalition v. Reno, 198 F.3d 1083 (9th Cir. 1999); rehearing denied, 220 F.3d 1113 (9th Cir. 2000); cert. granted, 531 U.S. 1124 (2001).

Holding
- The prohibitions of §§ 2256(8)(B) and 2256(8)(D) are unconstitutional because they abridged "the freedom to engage in a substantial amount of lawful speech". United States Court of Appeals for the Ninth Circuit affirmed.

Court membership
- Chief Justice William Rehnquist Associate Justices John P. Stevens · Sandra Day O'Connor; Antonin Scalia · Anthony Kennedy; David Souter · Clarence Thomas; Ruth Bader Ginsburg · Stephen Breyer

Case opinions
- Majority: Kennedy, joined by Stevens, Souter, Ginsburg, Breyer
- Concurrence: Thomas (in judgment)
- Concur/dissent: O'Connor, joined by Rehnquist, Scalia (Part II)
- Dissent: Rehnquist, joined by Scalia (except for paragraph discussing legislative history)

Laws applied
- U.S. Const. amend. I; Child Pornography Prevention Act of 1996

Ashcroft v. Free Speech Coalition, 535 U.S. 234 (2002), is a U.S. Supreme Court case that struck down two overbroad provisions of the Child Pornography Prevention Act of 1996 because they abridged "the freedom to engage in a substantial amount of lawful speech". The case was brought against the U.S. government by the Free Speech Coalition, a "California trade association for the adult-entertainment industry", along with Bold Type, Inc., a "publisher of a book advocating the nudist lifestyle"; Jim Gingerich, who paints nudes; and Ron Raffaelli, a photographer who specialized in erotic images. By striking down these two provisions, the Court rejected an invitation to increase the amount of speech that would be categorically outside the protection of the First Amendment.

== Background of the case ==
Prior case law had established two relevant categories of speech that were outside the protection of the First Amendment. In Miller v. California, 413 U.S. 15 (1973), the Court had held that the First Amendment allowed the government to restrict obscenity. And in New York v. Ferber, 458 U.S. 747 (1982), the Court held that the government could ban the distribution of child pornography to protect children from the harm inherent in making it. The Court extended Ferber to allow the criminalization of the possession of child pornography in Osborne v. Ohio, 495 U.S. 103 (1990).

=== The statute at issue ===
Before 1996, Congress defined child pornography with reference to the Ferber standard. In passing the Child Pornography Prevention Act of 1996, Congress added the two categories of speech challenged in this case to its definition of child pornography. The first prohibited "any visual depiction, including any photograph, film, video, picture, or computer or computer-generated image or picture" that "is, or appears to be, of a minor engaging in sexually explicit conduct". The Court observed that this provision "captures a range of depictions, sometimes called 'virtual child pornography', which include computer-generated images, as well as images produced by more traditional means". The second prohibited "any sexually explicit image that was advertised, promoted, presented, described, or distributed in such a manner that conveys the impression it depicts a minor engaging in sexually explicit conduct".

=== The lawsuit ===
The Free Speech Coalition filed a lawsuit seeking to enjoin enforcement of the CPPA in the United States District Court for the Northern District of California. They alleged that the first provision, prohibiting images that "appear to be" children engaged in sexual activity, and the second, prohibiting speech that "conveys the impression" that the images depict minors engaged in sexual activity, were overbroad, vague, and had a chilling effect on their legitimate work. The district court disagreed, adding that the overbreadth claim was specious as it was "highly unlikely" that any "adaptations of sexual works like Romeo and Juliet ... will be treated as 'criminal contraband'".

The Ninth Circuit reversed, reasoning that the government could not prohibit speech merely because of its tendency to persuade its viewers to engage in illegal activity. It ruled that the CPPA was substantially overbroad because it prohibited material that was neither obscene nor produced by exploiting real children, as Ferber prohibited. The court declined to reconsider the case en banc. The government asked the Supreme Court to review the case, and it agreed, noting that the Ninth Circuit's decision conflicted with the decisions of four other circuit courts of appeals. Ultimately, the Supreme Court agreed with the Ninth Circuit.

== Opinion ==
The First Amendment provides that "Congress shall make no law... abridging the freedom of speech". The Court opined that imposing a criminal sanction on protected speech is a "stark example of speech suppression", but at the same time, that sexual abuse of children "is a most serious crime and an act repugnant to the moral instincts of a decent people." "Congress may pass valid laws to protect children from abuse, and it has." The great difficulty with the two provisions of the CPPA at issue in this case was that they included categories of speech other than obscenity and child pornography, and thus were overbroad.

The Court concluded that the "CPPA prohibits speech despite its serious literary, artistic, political, or scientific value." In particular, it prohibits the visual depiction of teenagers engaged in sexual activity, a "fact of modern society and has been a theme in art and literature throughout the ages." Such depictions include performances of Romeo and Juliet, by William Shakespeare; the 1996 film William Shakespeare's Romeo + Juliet, directed by Baz Luhrmann; and the Academy Award winning movies Traffic and American Beauty. "If these films, or hundreds of others of lesser note that explore those subjects, contain a single graphic depiction of sexual activity within the statutory definition, the possessor of the film would be subject to severe punishment without inquiry into the work's redeeming value. This is inconsistent with an essential First Amendment rule: The artistic merit of a work does not depend on the presence of a single explicit scene."

Thus, the CPPA prohibited speech for a different reason than anti-child pornography laws. Laws prohibiting the distribution and possession of child pornography ban speech because of the manner in which it is produced, regardless of its serious literary or artistic value, but speech prohibited by the CPPA "records no crime and creates no victims by its production." Ferber did not hold that child pornography is "by definition without value", but that it is illegal because of the harm that making and distributing it necessarily inflicts upon children. Ferber expressly allowed virtual child pornography as an alternative that could preserve whatever value child pornography might have while at the same time mitigating the harm caused by making it. The CPPA would eliminate this distinction and punish people for engaging in what had heretofore been a legal alternative.

The Government countered that without the CPPA, child molesters might use virtual child pornography to seduce children. But "there are many things innocent in themselves, however, such as toys, movies, games, video games, candy, money, etc., that might be used for immoral purposes, yet we would not expect those to be prohibited because they can be misused." The First Amendment draws a distinction between words and deeds, and does not tolerate the banning of mere words simply because those words could lead to bad deeds. Although the CPPA's objective was to prohibit illegal conduct, it went well beyond that goal by restricting speech available to law-abiding adults. If the goal was to eliminate the market for all child pornography, the Court ruled that the government could not accomplish that goal by eliminating lawful speech in the process. The burden should not, however, fall on the speaker to prove that his speech is lawful, but instead on the government to prove that it is not. Furthermore, such an affirmative defense is "incomplete on its own terms" because it "allows persons to be convicted in some instances where they can prove children were not exploited in the production."

As for the provision that forbade advertising speech so as to convey the impression it depicted minors engaged in sexual conduct, the Court found this provision to be even more sweeping. "Even if a film contains no sexually explicit scenes involving minors, it could be treated as child pornography if the title and trailers convey the impression that the scenes would be found in the movie." Although pandering may be a relevant question in an obscenity prosecution, the "conveys the impression" prohibition forbade speech advertising depictions that were entirely lawful. "The First Amendment requires a more precise restriction" than the one drawn by CPPA.

=== Dissenting opinion ===
Chief Justice Rehnquist put forth a dissenting opinion, which began with a concern that rapidly advancing technology would soon make it very difficult, if not impossible, to distinguish between pornography made with actual children and pornography made with simulated images of children. "Congress has a compelling interest in ensuring the ability to enforce prohibitions of actual child pornography, and we should defer to its findings that rapidly advancing technology soon will make it all but impossible to do so." Rehnquist's dissenting opinion agreed that serious First Amendment concerns would arise if the government were to prosecute, for example, the producers of Traffic or American Beauty under CPPA, but it had not done so, and Rehnquist believed that the statute did not need to be construed to allow the government to do so. Rehnquist observed that the CPPA banned only depictions of minors engaged in actual sexual activity, not mere suggestions of sexual activity. CPPA simply outlawed "computer-generated images virtually indistinguishable from real children in sexually explicit conduct". None of the films the majority mentioned depicted children engaged in actual sexual activity. Regarding the "conveys the impression" provision, Rehnquist categorized this to be an anti-pandering measure. Because one could, by definition, only pander obscenity, and that which the panderer knew to be obscenity in any event, that provision also did not violate the First Amendment.

== The PROTECT Act ==
Following the Supreme Court's decision in April 2002, and until April 2003, Congress had made several attempts to revise the CPPA, including announcements by then-Attorney General John Ashcroft that he was drafting new legislation in tandem with Congress to improve prohibitions on computer-generated child pornography. Ernest Allen, then-president and CEO of the National Center for Missing and Exploited Children stated in response to the decision that "[its] decision will result in the proliferation of child pornography in America, unlike anything we have seen in more than 20 years", as part of the advocacy for new legislation.

Between April 2002 and April 2003, Congress attempted to override the Supreme Court's decisions using numerous bills, including the Child Obscenity and Pornography Prevention Act of 2002 (introduced on April 30, 2002, and which passed the House in October 2002 but did not pass the Senate) and the Child Obscenity and Pornography Prevention Act of 2003 (which was eventually incorporated into the PROTECT Act of 2003). On April 30, 2003, President George W. Bush signed the PROTECT Act of 2003 into law.

== Legacy ==
The court's decision was cited by Jeff Trexler of Comic Book Legal Defense Fund in reference to Texas Senate Bill 20, stating that the law, which creates new criminal offenses for those who possess, promote, or view visual material deemed obscene, which is said to depict a child, whether it is an actual person, animated or cartoon depiction, or an image of someone created through computer software or artificial intelligence, could "face constitutional challenges" under this legal precedent. He also said that the law allows for the "unconstitutional prosecution for possessing certain cartoons or animation." Marcel Green of Screen Rant also stated that the law is "likely unconstitutional", citing the court's decision in this case, which struck down the Child Pornography Prevention Act.

=== AI generated materials ===
In light of increased cases of using AI tools to generate harmful materials involved minors, many legal scholars are calling to reconsider Ashcroft in cases related to AI generated virtual child pornography.

== See also ==
- Child pornography laws in the United States
- List of United States Supreme Court cases, volume 535
- List of United States Supreme Court cases
