= Hugo Beigel =

Hugo G. Beigel (1897–1978) was an Austrian-American sex researcher and founding member of the Society for the Scientific Study of Sexuality. He was the first editor of the Journal of Sex Research, holding the office for 13 years. The journal established the Hugo Beigel Award in his honor, which is granted each year to a selected report published on it.

== Bibliography ==
- Beigel, Hugo G & Johnson, Warren R. (1980). Application of hypnosis in sex therapy.
