= James Cantor =

American-Canadian sexologist and clinical psychologist

James M. Cantor
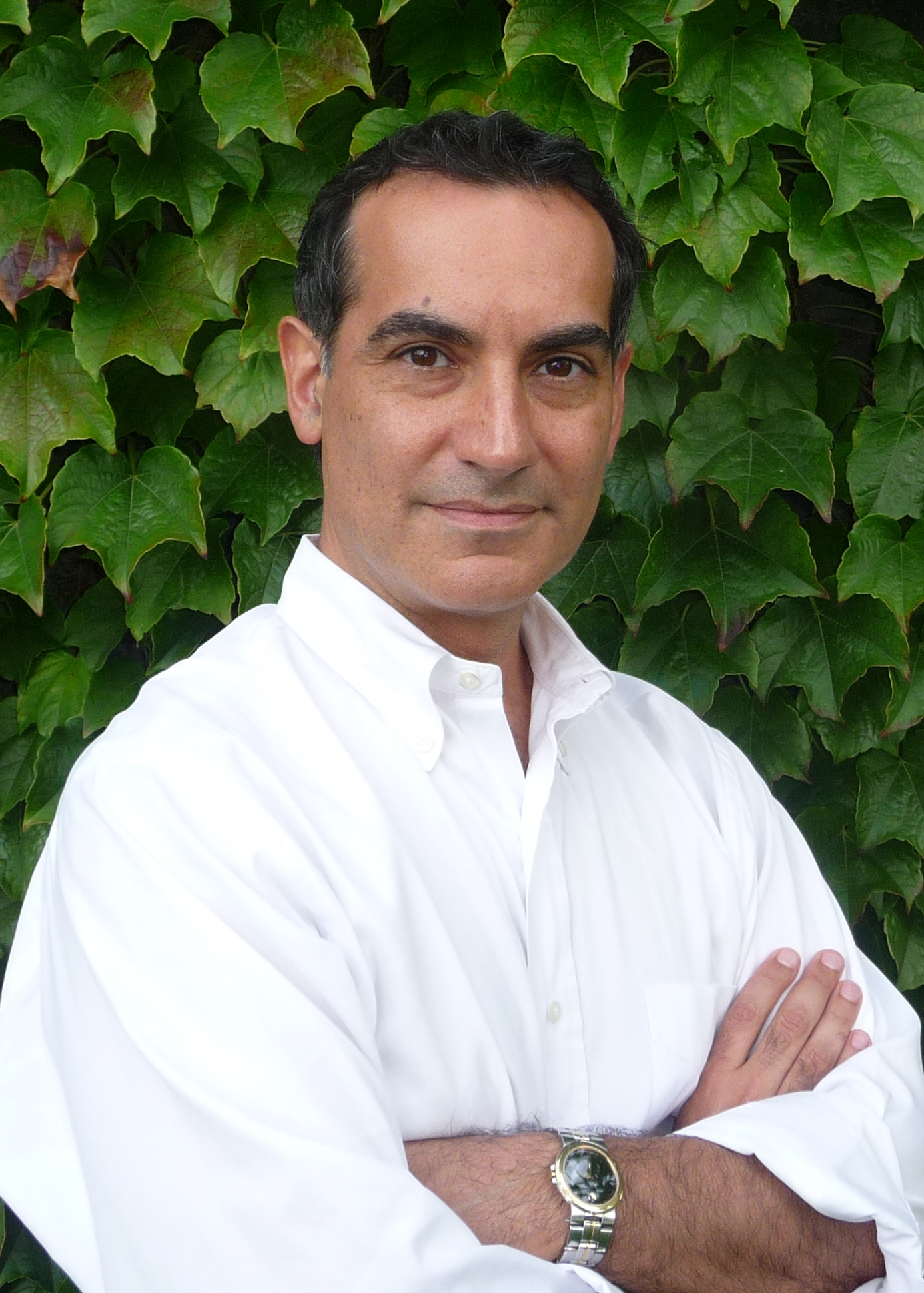
- Cantor in 2010
- Education: Rensselaer Polytechnic Institute; Boston University; McGill University
- Occupation: Psychologist specializing in sexology
- Known for: Sex research, atypical sexualities
- Scientific career
- Fields: Psychology; Sexology
- Workplaces: Centre for Addiction and Mental Health (CAMH); Toronto Sexuality Centre
- Website: jamescantor.org

James M. Cantor is an American-Canadian sexologist and clinical psychologist who specializes in hypersexuality and paraphilias.

A former senior scientist with the Centre for Addiction and Mental Health (CAMH) in Toronto, Cantor was editor-in-chief of the journal Sexual Abuse from 2010 to 2014. His research on brain differences in pedophiles has been cited as evidence that pedophilia is something unchangeable and that people are probably born with it.

== Early life and education ==
Cantor grew up on Long Island, New York, and attended Rensselaer Polytechnic Institute (RPI), where he majored in computer science with minors in mathematics and physics. During his studies at RPI, he became a resident adviser in the student dormitories, where he provided peer counseling. Finding that he enjoyed doing this more than his studies, he decided to pursue a doctorate in psychology. He is Jewish.

After obtaining his MA in psychology from Boston University, he was awarded a PhD in clinical psychology by McGill University in 1999, supervised by Irv Binik and James Pfaus, for using oxytocin to reverse fluoxetine-induced sexual dysfunction in male rats.

== Career ==
=== Positions held ===
After completing his PhD, Cantor worked in a psychiatric hospital that contained a sexual-behavior clinic and "phallometric laboratory" to assess men for pedophilia. In 1998, he began his postdoctoral training at CAMH as an intern under Ray Blanchard. He went on to become a senior scientist with CAMH and an associate professor in the University of Toronto's Department of Psychiatry. From 2010 to 2014, he was editor-in-chief of the journal Sexual Abuse. In 2019, Cantor left CAMH.

Cantor was a member of a research community called the Pediatric and Adolescent Gender Dysphoria Working Group (PAGDWG) alongside older sexological researchers such as Blanchard, Kenneth Zucker, and J. Michael Bailey. The PAGDWG was active between 2018 and 2020 and was described by the Southern Poverty Law Center as helping "generate pseudoscientific support for denying gender-affirming care".

In August 2020, Cantor left the Society for the Scientific Study of Sexuality (SSSS), after conflicts with other members over transgender issues. According to an article in the National Post, this occurred after Cantor was temporarily banned for an alleged pattern of bullying behavior. In an essay written to the organization, Cantor referenced J. K. Rowling's views on transgender topics. Cantor also resigned from an editorial position for the SSSS's Journal of Sex Research. The PinkNews article covering the events noted Cantor's support for LGB Alliance, often considered a transphobic or trans-exclusionary organization. As of January 2021, he sits on the editorial boards of the Journal of Sexual Aggression and Archives of Sexual Behavior.

=== Research ===
In the late 1980s and early 1990s, he published a series of papers advancing Blanchard's transsexualism typology. At CAMH, he also authored a series of papers and editorials with Kenneth Zucker. In 2023, the Southern Poverty Law Center described him as a "stalwart" of an "old guard" of "anti-trans" sexology researchers centered around CAMH who advocated treating transgender identities as a mental illness and promoted conversion therapy style cures. The SPLC reported their influence began to wane in the 2010s.

Cantor's research centers on the development of sexual interests, including sexual orientation and paraphilias. He has published on sex addiction, and atypical sexualities, including masochism, furries, vorarephilia, and others. According to Laura Kane, writing in the Toronto Star, Cantor's work has "greatly influenced the view among researchers that pedophilia has a biological basis". Using magnetic resonance imaging to examine the brains of male pedophiles, Cantor reported differences between them and the brains of non-pedophile offenders. He found a significant decrease in the amount of white matter in their brains compared to control subjects, in addition to having lower IQ, and being shorter than average. This was interpreted as suggesting a link to early brain development. Cantor insists that these findings do not imply that pedophiles should not be held legally responsible for their actions.

Cantor is one of the co-authors of a 2008 paper by Ray Blanchard, which proposed replacing the pedophilia diagnosis in DSM-5 with pedohebophilic disorder, adding hebephilia as part of the definition, and differentiating it into three subtypes: pedophilic type (attracted to children younger than 11), hebephilic (attracted to children between 11–14), and pedohebephilic type (attracted to both age groups mentioned). The main argument for this addition was that the DSM-IV-TR definition of pedophilia is not sufficient to cover attraction to "physically immature persons". The proposal was criticized by Richard Green and Karen Franklin, mainly on the grounds that it pathologizes reproductively valid behavior in order to uphold current social and legal standards. The proposal did not appear in DSM-5.

Cantor's research suggests that sex addiction represents a variety of distinct problems, rather than a single unitary phenomenon. His typology of people seeking help for sex addiction includes paraphilic hypersexuals, avoidant masturbators, chronic adulterers, people with sexual guilt, and others.

== Views ==
=== Pedophilia ===
On CNN in 2012, Cantor expressed the view that society should make it easier for persons who are sexually attracted to children but have never committed any sexual offenses to receive support and assistance in staying offense free. In his view, it is the sexual offenses (child molestation) and not the sexual attractions (pedophilia) that merit social sanctions. "One cannot choose to not be a pedophile, but one can choose to not be a child molester." On BBC in 2014, Cantor also expressed his view on how difficult it can be to identify pedophiles. He claims that "Because paedophilia is so secretive and so few people are willing to admit it, there is no meaningful way to get a reliable estimate."

Cantor believes that pedophiles who commit sexual offenses against children "do so when they feel the most desperate—when they have nothing to lose, nothing in their lives worth protecting". He recommends that therapists use cognitive behavioral therapy and other techniques to reduce feelings of isolation and hopelessness so that pedophiles can lead "productive, offense-free lives". Cantor stated that the online group Virtuous Pedophiles—a group for pedophiles who acknowledge having a sexual interest in children, and whose members share the belief that sexual activity between adults and children is wrong and always will be—could help prevent child sexual abuse. He states that pedophiles "experience desire, affection, and heartbreak as strongly as anybody else. It is a deep, dark, long-lasting ache, and they can't tell a soul." He has rejected any linkage between homosexuality and pedophilia: "It's quite solidly shown in the scientific literature that there is absolutely no association between being a gay man and being a pedophile." He vocally opposed the Boy Scout bans on openly gay participants.

=== Sex addiction ===
In an interview about sex addiction and hypersexuality, Cantor expressed mixed views. When asked if he believed sex addiction should be considered a mental illness, he said yes, but added that it may be important to not misuse a concept and diagnosis. Cantor has expressed dislike for labels being used to describe sexual addiction. He has preferred to not assume one theory or another, and to instead use the term hypersexuality.

=== Gender dysphoria ===
Cantor has written that transsexuality is a phenomenon of the brain, saying that MRI research has verified the Blanchard typology of two different kinds of male-to-female transsexuals. One of these types (called "homosexual transsexuals") have brains like gay men, which possess some features more common among women, and another type (called "autogynephilic transsexuals" or "heterosexual transsexuals") which possess features that differ from typical brains, but not in a feminized direction.

=== BDSM ===
Referring to research comparing BDSM practitioners with non-BDSM counterparts, Cantor said what was interesting was "how few differences and how small the differences were between these groups." He added, "Overall, it doesn't look like there is anything special that makes a person curious about BSDM. Instead, it seems that people who are extroverted and open to experience in general will experiment with all kinds of things—sex being just one of them."

When asked by columnist Dan Savage to respond to a mother concerned about her son developing into a sexual sadist, Cantor wrote that having violent sexual fantasies, "doesn't mean anyone is likely developing into a psychopathic sex killer."

== Transgender rights ==
In 2018, Cantor was hired as an expert witness by the Alliance Defending Freedom, on a case to ban trans girls from girls' school sports in the state of West Virginia.

In May 2022, the state of Alabama hired Cantor as an expert witness in defense of a law criminalizing gender-affirming care for minors with gender dysphoria. However, on cross-examination, the federal judge discovered that Cantor had no clinical experience diagnosing or treating minors with gender dysphoria, or in monitoring such patients for improvements. Cantor also lacked knowledge of the treatments and methods used in gender clinics in the state of Alabama. As a result, the judge wrote that he gave Cantor's testimony "very little weight".

In July 2022, the state of Texas similarly hired Cantor as an expert witness in defense of a directive from Texas Governor Greg Abbott to investigate parents of minors who receive gender-affirming care. The directive was challenged by Lambda Legal and the ACLU on behalf of PFLAG. According to an article in the Houston Chronicle, Cantor said that for minors experiencing gender dysphoria, the condition would usually desist and they would become cisgender gay or lesbian people. The attorneys for the plaintiffs objected saying that the studies referred to "tomboys" and "effeminate" youth. They further argued that Cantor lacked practical experience treating minors with gender dysphoria, and most of the studies he cited were published before 1988.

In 2023, Cantor defended Florida governor Ron DeSantis's ban on Medicaid coverage for gender-affirming care for adults.

According to an October 2023 report by CBC News, since 2021, Cantor has testified in over 25 cases, including bills to restrict transgender healthcare, to ban trans students from school sports, and to restrict student use of school bathrooms.

== Public engagement ==
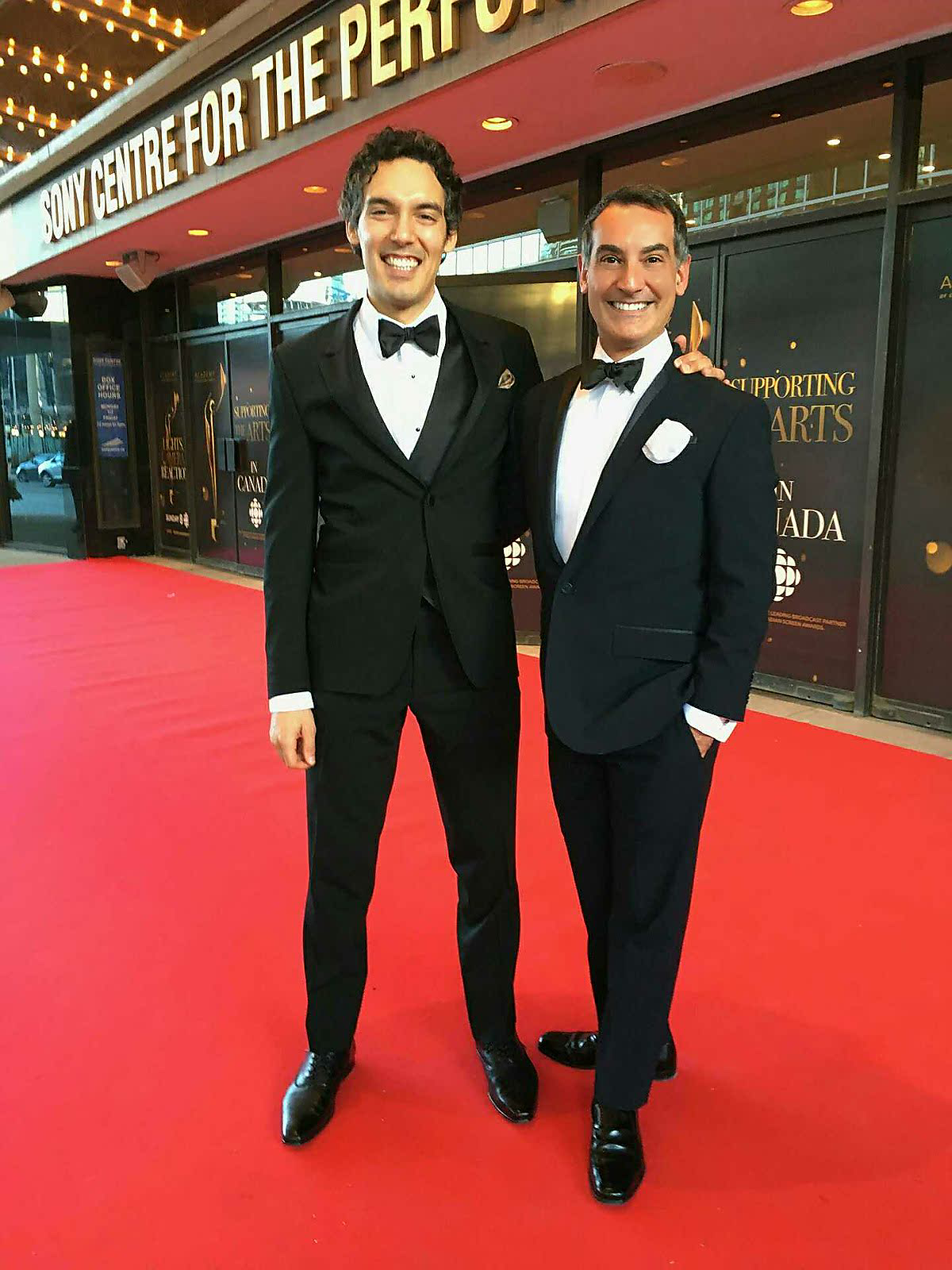
Cantor at the Canadian Screen Awards following the nomination of I, Pedophile, 2017

Cantor maintains a blog about sex research issues, Sexology Today. He has been quoted in the media about several high-profile cases of unusual sexual behavior. Such cases have included politician Anthony Weiner, entertainers Bill Cosby and Mark Salling, former Subway spokesperson Jared Fogle, and incel attacker Alek Minassian. Cantor delivered the keynote address at the founding of the Netherlands Association for the Treatment of Sexual Abusers in 2015.

In 2016, Cantor and his research were the subject of a documentary, I, Pedophile, which featured Cantor alongside interviews with male pedophiles. The program followed him to the Prevention Project Dunkelfeld in Berlin, the only other center in the world conducting research into the neurological basis of pedophilia. In 2017, the program was nominated for but did not win the Academy of Canadian Cinema and Television award for best social/political documentary.

== Personal life ==
Cantor is gay, and describes himself as politically liberal and as an atheist.

== Selected works ==
- Cantor, J. M.; et al. (October 2016). "Independent Component Analysis of Resting-State Functional Magnetic Resonance Imaging in Pedophiles". The Journal of Sexual Medicine. 13 (10): 1546–1554. doi:10.1016/j.jsxm.2016.08.004. PMID 27641922.
- Cantor, J. M. (2015). "In his own words: Response to Moser". Journal of Sexual Medicine. 12 (12): 2502–2503. doi:10.1111/jsm.13075. PMID 26696227.
- Cantor, J. M. (2012). "Is Homosexuality a Paraphilia? The Evidence for and Against". Archives of Sexual Behavior. 41 (1): 237–247. doi:10.1007/s10508-012-9900-3. PMC 3310132. PMID 22282324.
- Cantor, J.; et al. (2008). "Cerebral white matter deficiencies in pedophilic men". Journal of Psychiatric Research. 42 (3): 167–183. doi:10.1016/j.jpsychires.2007.10.013. PMID 18039544.
- Seto, M. C.; Cantor, J. M.; Blanchard, R. (2006). "Child pornography offenses are a valid diagnostic indicator of pedophilia". Journal of Abnormal Psychology. 115 (3): 610–5. CiteSeerX 10.1.1.606.7677. doi:10.1037/0021-843X.115.3.610. PMID 16866601.
- Cantor, J. M.; et al. (2005). "Quantitative reanalysis of aggregate data on IQ in sexual offenders". Psychological Bulletin. 131 (4): 555–68. CiteSeerX 10.1.1.557.6376. doi:10.1037/0033-2909.131.4.555. PMID 16060802.
- Cantor, J. M.; et al. (2004). "Intelligence, Memory, and Handedness in Pedophilia". Neuropsychology. 18 (1): 3–14. doi:10.1037/0894-4105.18.1.3. PMID 14744183.
- Cantor, J. M.; Binik, Y. M.; Pfaus, J. G. (1999). "Chronic fluoxetine inhibits sexual behavior in the male rat: Reversal with oxytocin". Psychopharmacology. 144 (4): 355–362. doi:10.1007/s002130051018. PMID 10435408.
- Pilkington, N. W.; Cantor, J. M. (1996). "Perceptions of heterosexual bias in professional psychology programs: A survey of graduate students". Professional Psychology: Research and Practice. 27 (6): 604–612. doi:10.1037/0735-7028.27.6.604.
