= Ronald Langevin =

Canadian psychologist (born 1940)

Ronald Lindsay André "Ron" Langevin (born September 28, 1940) is a Canadian forensic psychologist at the University of Toronto. He is the founding editor of Annals of Sex Research, now titled Sexual Abuse: A Journal of Research and Treatment.

== Life and career ==
Langevin was born in Montreal and earned a Ph.D. in psychology from University of Toronto in 1970. He wrote materials for the Canadian Council for Research in Education before taking a position at the Clarke Institute of Psychiatry, where he worked with Kurt Freund.

Langevin argued against the effectiveness of reparative therapy in 1985. He served as an expert witness in a sexual abuse trial in 1989. In 1989 also, Langevin published findings suggesting a correlation between sex offenders and traumatic brain injury, though he suggested caution in the use of the findings, as half his subjects were alcohol abusers.

He is director of Juniper Associates Psychological Services and is an associate professor in the Law & Mental Health program at University of Toronto. He has also published materials through Juniper Press. Langevin is a charter member of the International Association for the Treatment of Sexual Offenders (IATSO).

== Selected bibliography ==
- Langevin, R; Curnoe, S (February 2011). "Psychopathy, ADHD, and brain dysfunction as predictors of lifetime recidivism among sex offenders". Int J Offender Ther Comp Criminol. 55: 5–26. doi:10.1177/0306624X09360968. PMID 20130091.
- Langevin, R; Curnoe, S (August 2008). "Are the mentally retarded and learning disordered overrepresented among sex offenders and paraphilics?". Int J Offender Ther Comp Criminol. 52: 401–15. doi:10.1177/0306624X07305826. PMID 17717332.
- Langevin, R; Langevin, M; Curnoe, S (Aug 2007). "Family size, birth order, and parental age among male paraphilics and sex offenders". Arch Sex Behav. 36 (4): 599–609. doi:10.1007/s10508-006-9110-y. PMID 17186126.
- Langevin, R (March 2006). "Sexual offenses and traumatic brain injury". Brain Cogn. 60: 206–7. PMID 16646123.
- Langevin, R; Curnoe, S; Bain, J (Apr 2000). "A study of clerics who commit sexual offenses: are they different from other sex offenders?". Child Abuse Negl. 24 (4): 535–45. PMID 10798842.
- Langevin, R; Glancy, GD; Curnoe, S; Bain, J (Oct 1999). "Physicians who commit sexual offences: are they different from other sex offenders?". Can J Psychiatry. 44 (8): 775–80. PMID 10566107.
- Langevin, R; Wright, P; Handy, L (1988). "The sex killer". Ann Sex Res. 1: 263–301. doi:10.1007/BF00852801.
- Langevin, R; Bain, J; Wortzman, G; Hucker, S; Dickey, R; Wright, P (1988). "Sexual sadism: brain, blood, and behavior". Ann N Y Acad Sci. 528: 163–71. PMID 3421590.
- Langevin R, Ben-Aron M, Wortzman G, Dickey R, Handy L (1987). Brain damage, diagnosis, and substance abuse among violent offenders Behavioral Sciences & the Law Volume 5, Issue 1, pages 77–94, Winter 1987
- Langevin R (1983). Sexual strands: understanding and treating sexual anomalies in men. Psychology Press, ISBN 978-0-89859-205-4
- Paitich, D; Langevin, R; Freeman, R; Mann, K; Handy, L (Sep 1977). "The Clarke SHQ: a clinical sex history questionnaire for males". Arch Sex Behav. 6 (5): 421–36. PMID 921525.
- Paitich, D; Langevin, R (Jun 1976). "The Clarke Parent-Child Relations Questionnaire: a clinically useful test for adults". J Consult Clin Psychol. 44 (3): 428–36. PMID 932273.
- Freund, K; Langevin, R; Wescom, T; Zajac, Y (Sep 1975). "Heterosexual interest in homosexual males". Arch Sex Behav. 4 (5): 509–18. PMID 1191003.
- Freund, K; Langevin, R; Zajac, Y (Aug 1974). "Heterosexual aversion in homosexual males. A second experiment". Br J Psychiatry. 125 (0): 177–80. PMID 4472133.
- Freund, K; Langevin, R; Zajac, Y; Steiner, B; Zajac, A (Feb 1974). "The trans-sexual syndrome in homosexual males". J Nerv Ment Dis. 158 (2): 145–53. PMID 4813925.
- Freund, K; Langevin, R; Cibiri, S; Zajac, Y (Feb 1973). "Heterosexual aversion in homosexual males". Br J Psychiatry. 122 (567): 163–9. PMID 4714830.
