= I, Pedophile =

2016 Canadian documentary film

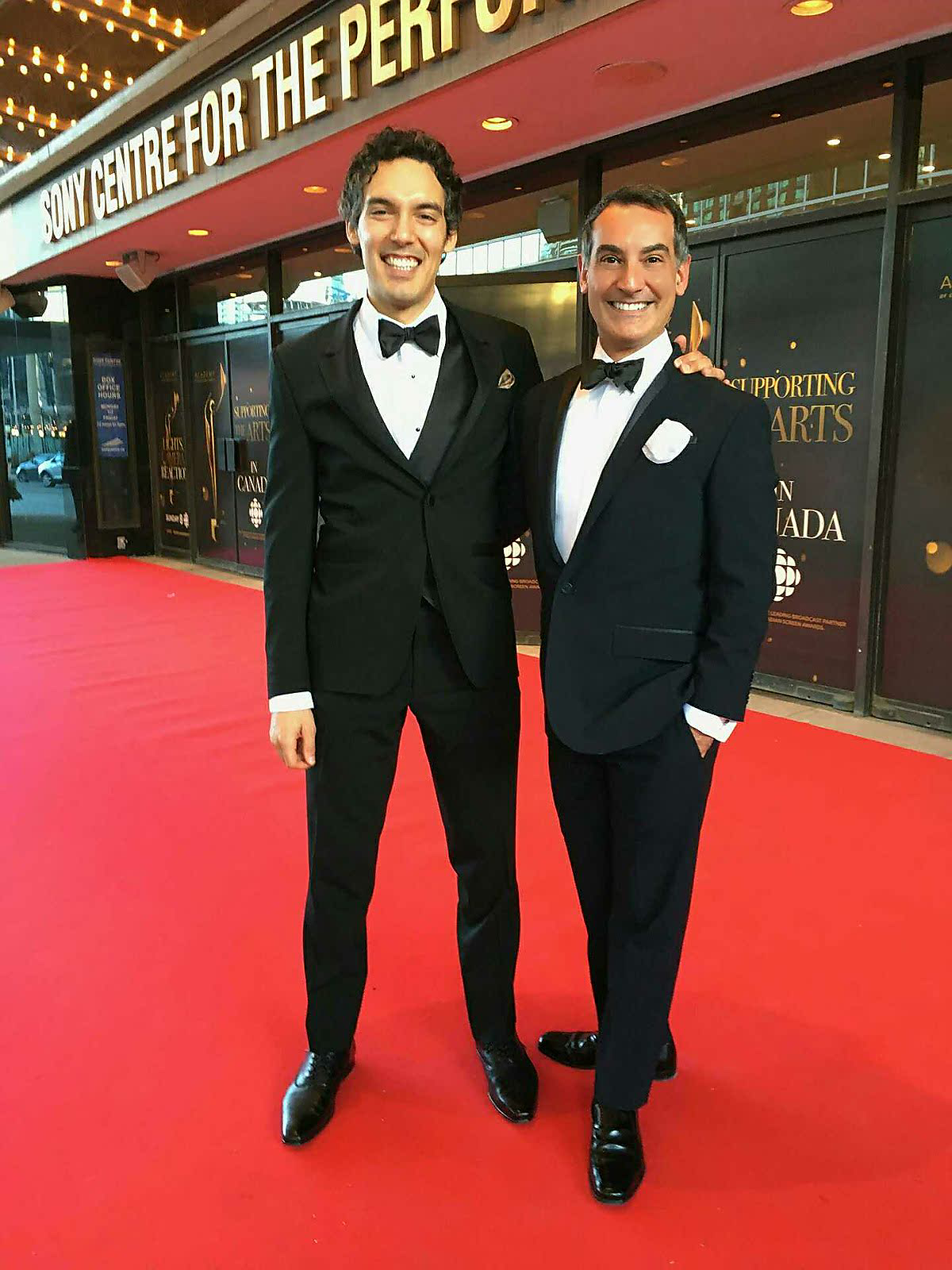
- Director Matt Campea and James Cantor
- Written by: Matthew Campea; Robin Benger
- Directed by: Matthew Campea
- Starring: Bob Radke; Edward Chambers; Dr. James Cantor; Dr. Klaus Beier
- Music by: Grant Fonda; Daniel Pellerin
- Countries of origin: Canada, Germany
- Original language: English

Production
- Editor: Matthew Campea
- Running time: 52 minutes

Original release
- Network: CBC Television
- Release: March 10, 2016

I, Pedophile is a Canadian documentary film about men who are sexually attracted to children, but do not commit sexual offenses. It was first broadcast in 2016 and was nominated for the Donald Brittain Award for best social/political documentary program at the 5th Canadian Screen Awards.

The film introduces Bob Radke and Ed Chambers, two pedophilic men who openly acknowledge that they experience sexual attractions to children, but state that they have never molested one. They live their lives suppressing their sex drives, but still face being stigmatized and marginalized.

== Content ==
The film features James Cantor, a neuroscientist and sex researcher who "conducted revolutionary research that found a dramatic cross-wiring in the connective tissue (or 'white matter') of pedophiles' brains, in an area related to stimuli and sexual response." Cantor explains his program of research findings in the film, showing how the findings led to the conclusion that pedophilia is in the brain and that those brain differences were likely present before birth. He states, "The day before somebody gives in to his sexual interest in children, he was a person who was struggling with his sexual interests in children, and that's the day we failed him."

Director Matt Campea described in an interview what drew him to this topic for a documentary: "They have this secret that festers inside them that they can't talk to anyone about. That's a dark place." He continued, "We're at a moment in time here. If somebody is born with something they can't control, we shouldn't condemn them. We should extend a compassionate hand and give them the resources they need to lead a virtuous, dignified life."

== Release and reception ==
I, Pedophile premiered on CBC Television's Firsthand documentary series to positive reviews. The Toronto Star wrote that the film was "so riveting and enlightening, you can't stop watching it." The film was nominated by the Academy of Canadian Cinema and Television for Best Social/Political Documentary Program (the Donald Brittain Award) at the 5th Canadian Screen Awards.
