= Chronophilia =

Romantic or sexual attraction to individuals of particular age ranges

Chronophilia are forms of romantic preferences and/or sexual attractions limited to individuals of particular age ranges. Some such attractions, specifically those towards prepubescents and those towards the elderly, constitute types of paraphilia.

The term was coined by John Money and has not been widely adopted by sexologists, who instead use terms that refer to the specific age range in question. An arguable historical precursor was Richard von Krafft-Ebing's concept of "age fetishism". Importantly, chronophilia are technically not determined by age itself, but by human sexual maturity stages, such as body type, secondary sexual characteristics and other visible features, particularly as measured by the stages of the Tanner scale.

== History ==
The term "chronophilia" was coined by John Money in 1986, soon after the DSM 3 had adopted the term "paraphilia" as a classification. He defined a chronophilia as the condition in which "the paraphile's sexuoerotic age is discordant with his/her actual chronological age and is concordant with the age of the [preferred] partner". In that same year, Money coined the terms "infantophilia" and "nepiophilia". The term "teleiophilia" was coined by Ray Blanchard in 2000, while "mesophilia" was coined by Michael Seto in 2014.

== Characteristics ==
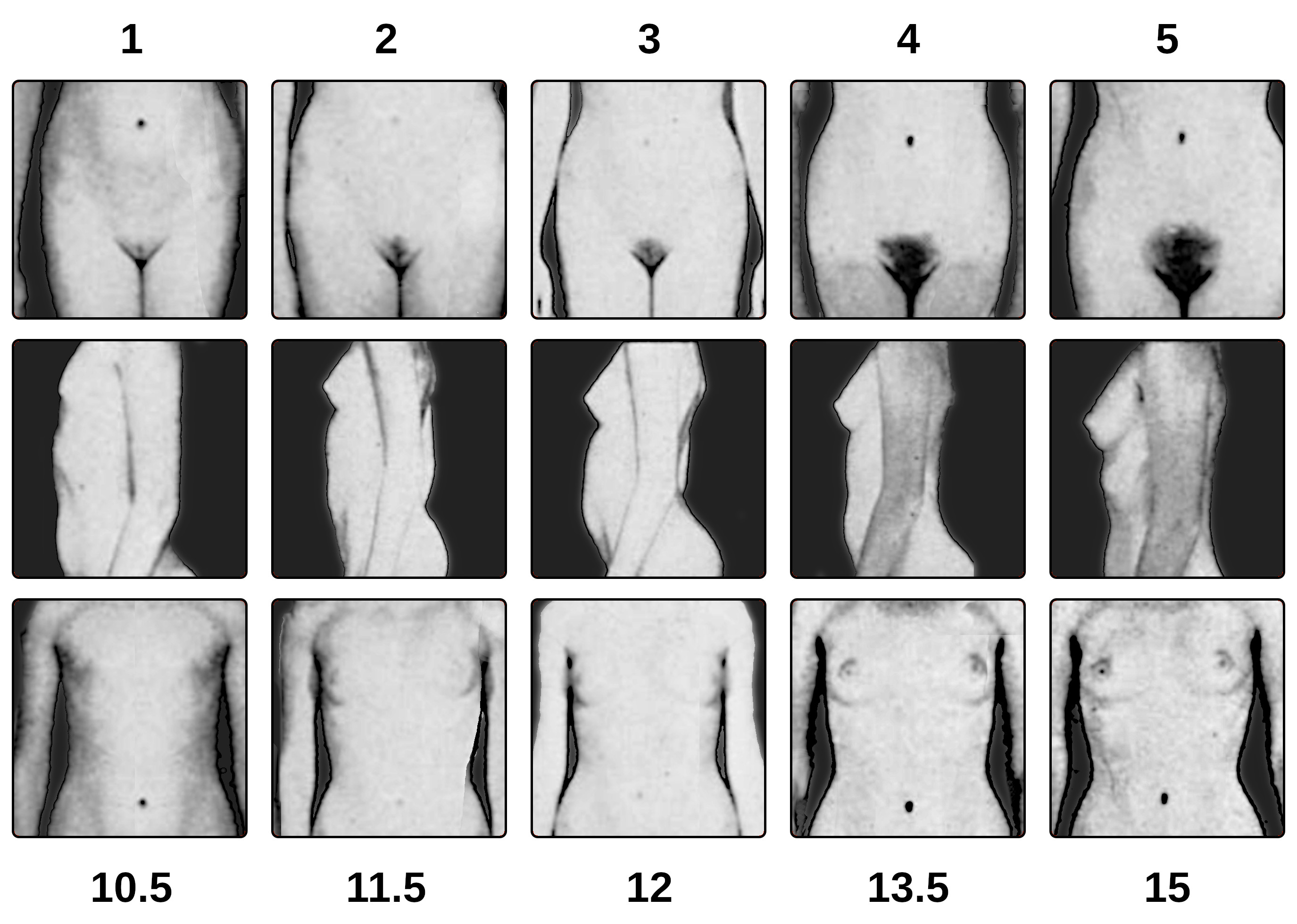
The five Tanner stages, on a female subject

Sexual attractions based on age are essentially determined by preferences for different stages of sexual maturity (which are generally separated into different Tanner stages), such as body size, secondary sexual characteristics and other visible body features. As such, historical events such as the decrease of the age of puberty throughout the 20th century have changed the traits that constitute some chronophilias. Chronophilias may also encompass preferences to psychological features related to certain age groups.

Similar to other forms of sexual attraction, chronophilias related to attraction to children have been shown to start at puberty and remain stable over a person's lifetime. Chronophilias can also be exclusive or nonexclusive in relation to each other. Although Tanner stages may not sufficiently describe all age groups, each of them correspond to at least one chronophilia.

=== Spectrum and typology ===
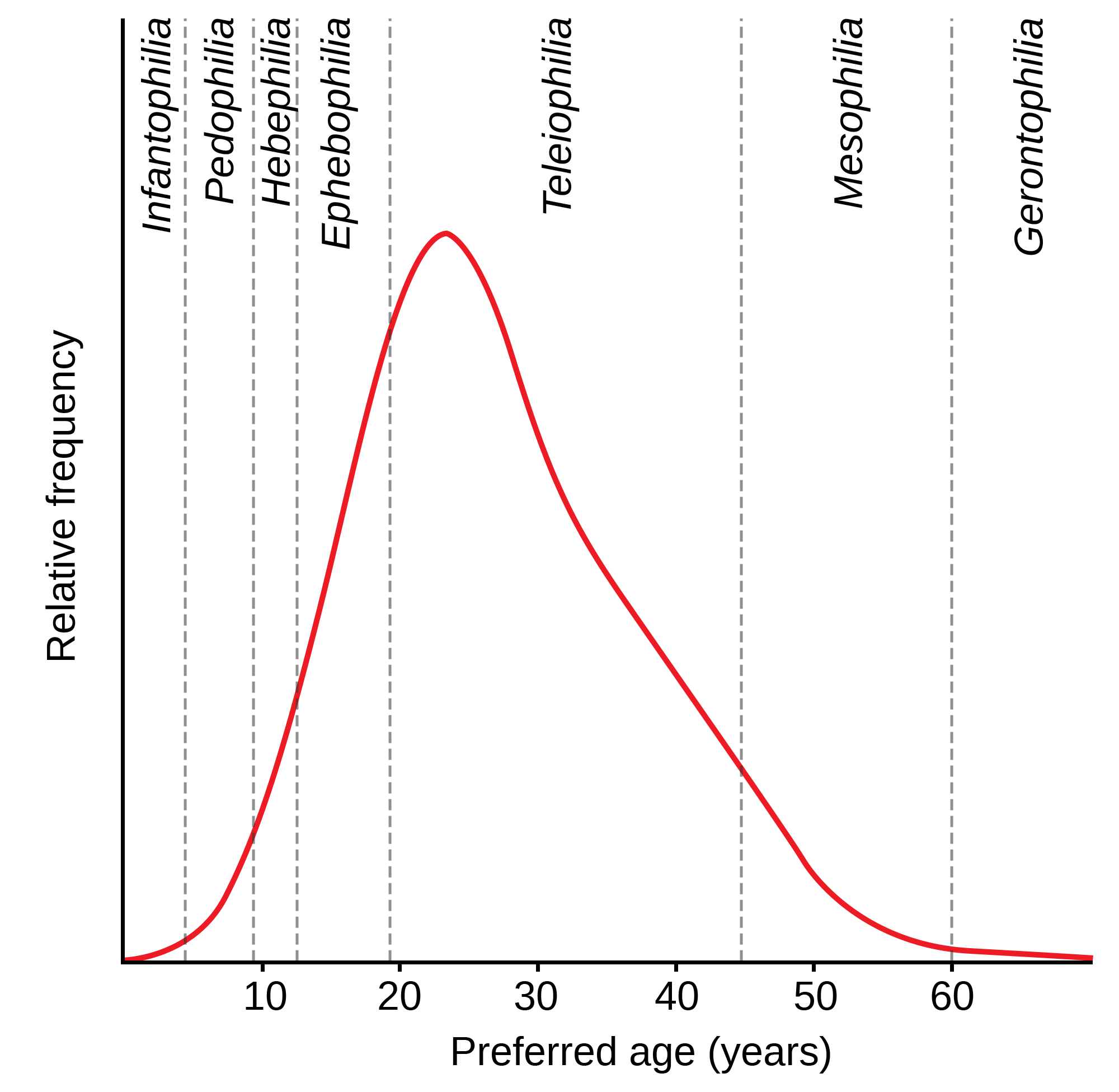
Continuous distribution of the male chronophilic population divided by age of interest.

A number of researchers have classified chronophilia as dichotomous types, while others have defined them as a gradient based on age. Under the age-based gradient theory, persons who have a predominant chronophilia would likely also have others that are closely adjacent to it (e.g. sexual attraction to adults are more likely to co-exist with sexual attraction to teenagers, but less likely to co-exist with sexual attraction to infants).

In an article published on Archives of Sexual Behavior, Seto defined chronophilias as lying in a continuous, unimodal distribution of age preferences, ranging from nepiophilia to gerontophilia, and in which teleiophilia was the most prevalent chronophilia. Seto wrote in his article that the concept of sexual orientation should be expanded to include traits such as age preferences. He also acknowledged that people can simultaneously have multiple chronophilias.

== List of chronophilias ==
The following is a list of chronophilias. Age ranges are approximated.

chronophilia	sexual preference	Tanner stage(s)	ref
nepiophilia	infancy and toddlerhood (0-4)	1	
pedophilia	pre-pubescence (0-13)	1	
hebephilia	pubescence (11-14)	2,3	
ephebophilia	adolescence (15-19)	4	
teleiophilia	young adulthood (18-late 30s)	5	
mesophilia	middle-age adulthood (40-late 50s)	5	
gerontophilia	old age (60+)	5	

== See also ==
- Age disparity in sexual relationships
- Cougar (slang)
- List of paraphilias
- MILF
