= Cougar (slang) =

Woman who seeks romantic or sexual relationships with younger men

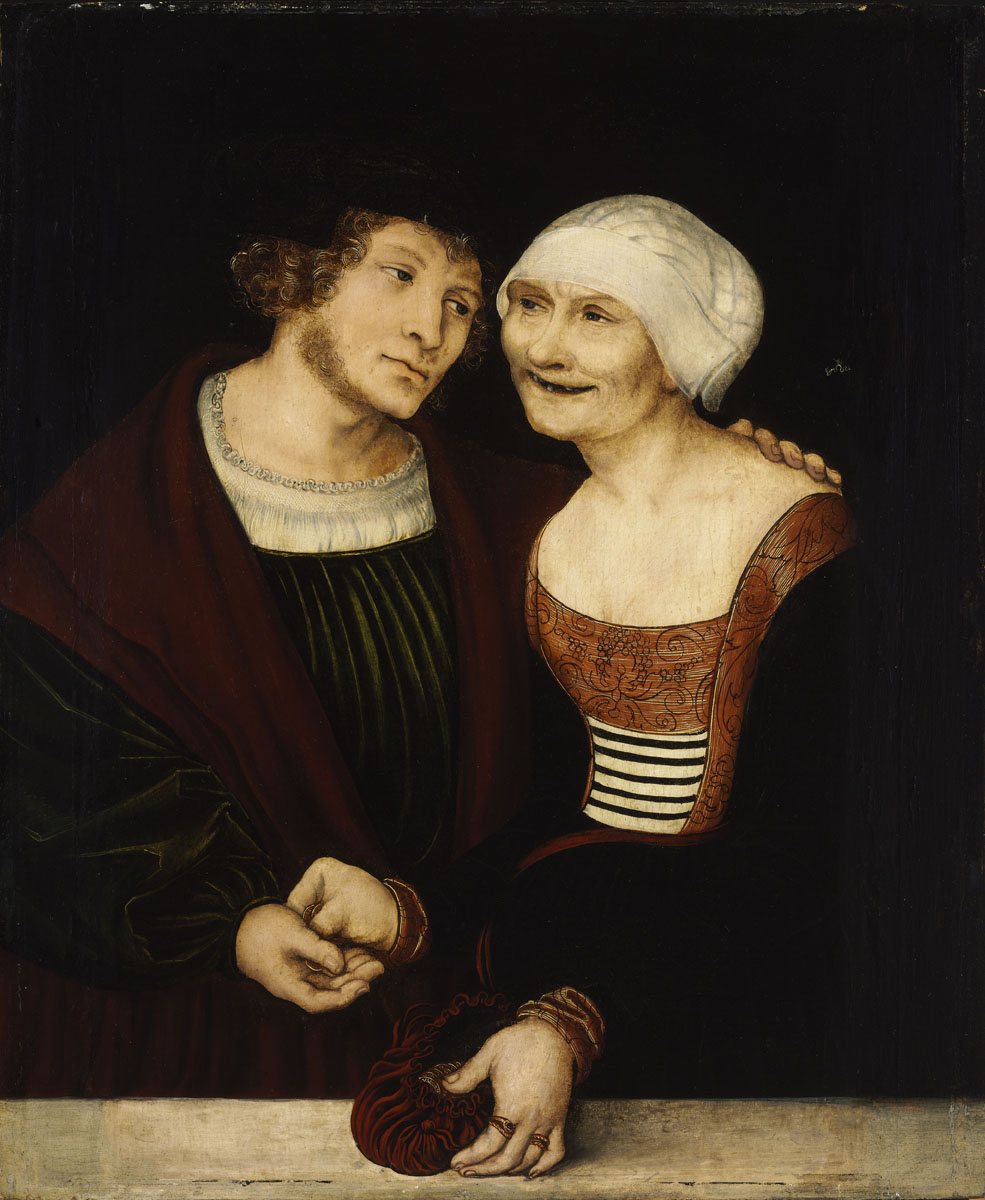
Young Man and Old Woman Lucas Cranach the Elder, 1520

Cougar is a slang term for a woman who seeks romantic or sexual relationships with significantly younger men.

== Terminology and age ==
The origin of the word cougar as a slang term is debated, but it is thought to have originated in Western Canada and first appeared in print on the Canadian dating website Cougardate.com possibly as early as 1999. It has also been stated to have "originated in Vancouver, British Columbia, as a put-down for older women who would go to bars and go home with whoever was left at the end of the night". Though, as with many formerly derogatory terms, there has been an increasing effort to "reclaim" the term in recent years.

The term has been variously applied to middle-aged women who pursue romantic or sexual relations with men more than ten to twenty years younger than they are.

Occasionally, the slang term "puma" (itself a literal synonym for cougar) is used to denote a woman under the age of 40 who prefers to date significantly younger men, that is, a younger cougar.

== Academia ==
A 2010 British psychological study published in Evolution and Human Behavior asserted that men and women, in general, continue to follow traditional gender roles when searching for mates, and thus concluded that the posited "cougar phenomenon" does not exist, or more precisely, exists but is rare. The study found that most men preferred younger, physically attractive women, while most women, of any age, preferred successful, established men their age or older. The study found very few instances of older women pursuing much younger men and vice versa. The study has been criticized, however, for limiting their results to online dating profiles, which are traditionally not used by those seeking older or younger partners, and for excluding the United States from the study.

== Media ==
The cougar concept has been increasingly used in television shows, advertising, and film. Barney Stinson in the sitcom How I Met Your Mother used the term in 2006. The 2007 film Cougar Club was dedicated to the subject. In spring 2009, TV Land broadcast The Cougar, a reality series in which an older woman would pick a date from twenty younger men. Similarly, Extreme Cougar Wives was a reality television special broadcast which aired on TLC in 2012. It followed several women and their journeys dating younger men. The 2009 sitcom Cougar Town originally explored the difficulty and stigma of many so-called cougars. In The Graduate (1967), a married mother pursues a much younger man (21 in the film). On the soap opera Days of Our Lives, character Eve Donovan is a cougar, repeatedly sleeping with the much younger JJ Deveraux.

The "cougar phenomenon", as it is called, is frequently associated with present-day, glamorous celebrities such as Madonna, Sam Taylor-Johnson and Demi Moore. However, it has been claimed that the trend of influential women dating younger men extends back a lot further through history to notable figures including Cleopatra, Catherine the Great, Wu Zetian and Elizabeth I.

Rasa von Werder, also known as Kellie Everts, had become a self-proclaimed cougar herself and photographer of younger men in her later years, in and around the college town Binghamton, New York. At Binghamton University, she was interviewed by and featured several times on the front page of their student newspaper. She has written extensively about her experience as well as the general social phenomenon in several books, including Old Woman, Young Man: Why They Belong Together, Parts I and II (2011 and 2019, respectively), and more recently in The Man Whisperer: How an Old Lady Snags Young Men for Sex (2024).

== See also ==
- Age disparity in sexual relationships
- Ageplay
- Ephebophilia
- Evolutionary psychology
- Gigolo
- Gold digger
- Hebephilia
- Himbo
- Jailbait
- MILF
- Phaedra complex
- Sugar dating
- Teleiophilia
- Transactional sex
- Vixen
