= Ephebophilia =

Sexual attraction to mid-to-late adolescents

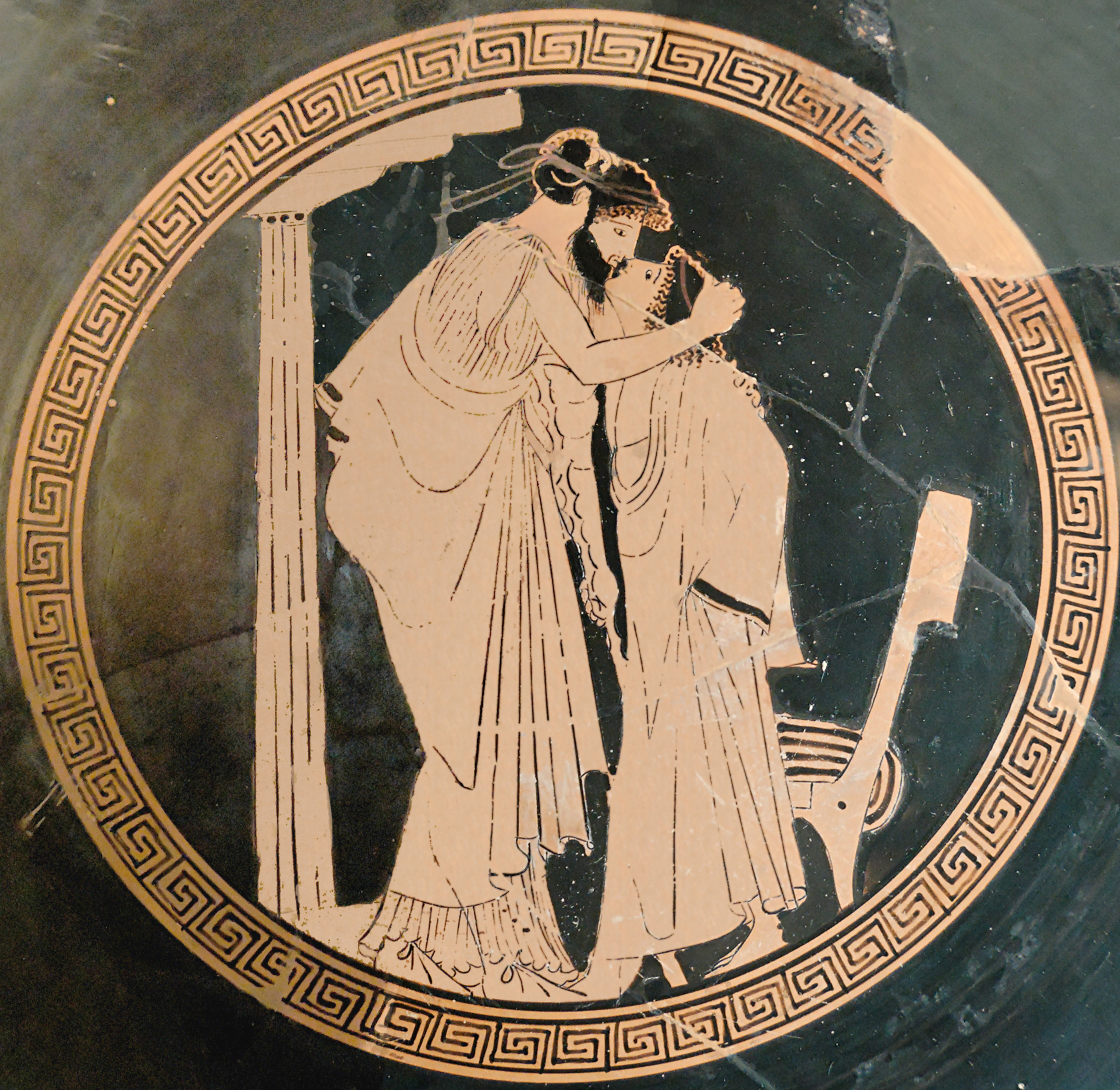
Erastes (lover) and Eromenos (beloved) kissing. Tondo of an Attic red-figured cup, c. 480 BC

Ephebophilia is the primary sexual interest in mid-to-late adolescents, generally ages 15 to 19 and showing Tanner stages 4 to 5 of physical development. The term was originally used in the late 19th to mid-20th century. It is one of a number of sexual preferences across age groups subsumed under the technical term chronophilia. Ephebophilia strictly denotes the preference for mid-to-late adolescent sexual partners, not the mere presence of some level of sexual attraction. It is not a psychiatric diagnosis.

In research environments, specific terms are used for chronophilias: for instance, ephebophilia to refer to the sexual preference for mid-to-late adolescents, hebephilia to refer to the sexual preference for earlier pubescent individuals, and pedophilia to refer to the primary or exclusive sexual interest in prepubescent children.

== Etymology and definitions ==
The term ephebophilia comes from the Ancient Greek: ἔφηβος ephebos (from epi "upon" + hebe "youth", "early manhood") defined as "a youth of eighteen to twenty, particularly one who underwent his dokimasia and was registered as a citizen (Athens)", and φιλία -philia 'love'. It has been used in publications by Dutch psychologist Frits Bernard in 1950, and reprinted in 1960 in the gay support magazine Vriendschap under the pseudonym Victor Servatius, crediting the origin of the term to Magnus Hirschfeld with no exact date given. The word was in fact first published in French (éphébophilie), from Georges Saint-Paul's 1896 book, Tares et Poisons: Perversion et Perversité Sexuelles.

The term was described by Frenchman Félix Buffière in 1980, and Pakistani scholar Tariq Rahman, who argued that ephebophilia should be especially used with regard to homosexuality when describing the aesthetic and erotic interest of adult men in adolescent boys in classical Persian, Turkish, or Urdu literature. The term was additionally revived by Ray Blanchard to denote men who sexually prefer 15- to 19-year-olds. The typical ephebophilic age range has also been given as ages 15–16. Women's sexual interest in adolescents has been studied significantly less than men's sexual interest in adolescents.

Although ephebophilia is not a psychiatric diagnosis, the term pedophilia is commonly used by the general public and the media, at least in the English-speaking world, to refer to any sexual interest by significantly older adults in minors below the local age of consent or even below the local age of majority, regardless of their level of physical and/or mental development.

== Characteristics ==
Mid-to-late adolescents typically have physical characteristics near or identical to that of legal adults. Because of this, scholars Skye Stephens and Michael C. Seto argue that ephebophilia contrasts what a paraphilia entails since "older adolescents are reproductively viable and the fact that typically men are sexually attracted to older adolescents, as reflected in self-report, psychophysiological, and pornography use studies." Psychiatrist and sexologist Fred Berlin states that most men can find persons in this age group sexually attractive, but that "of course, that doesn't mean they're going to act on it. Some men who become involved with teenagers may not have a particular disorder. Opportunity and other factors may have contributed to their behaving in the way they do". According to psychologist and sexologist James Cantor, it is "very common for regular men to be attracted to 18-year-olds or 20-year-olds. It's not unusual for a typical 16-year-old to be attractive to many men and the younger we go the fewer and fewer men are attracted to that age group."

Ephebophilia is used only to describe the preference for mid-to-late adolescent sexual partners, not the mere presence of some level of sexual attraction. Generally, the preference is not regarded by psychologists as a pathology, as long as it does not interfere with other major areas of one's life. It is not included in the Diagnostic and Statistical Manual of Mental Disorders, 5th Edition (DSM-5) or the ICD-10.

Blanchard et al. stated that hebephilia, erotic interest which centers on young pubescents, has not come into widespread use, even among professionals who work with sex offenders, and may have been confused with the term ephebophilia, which denotes a preference for older adolescents. They reasoned that "few would want to label erotic interest in late—or even mid—adolescents as a psychopathology, so the term hebephilia may have been ignored along with ephebophilia". Although Stephens and Seto argue that, in contrast to ephebophilia, "conceptually, hebephilia is a paraphilia, reflecting an atypical (statistically rare) sexual age interest in pubescent children", they also state hebephilia has not been widely accepted as a paraphilia or mental disorder and that there is significant academic debate as to whether it should be classified as either.

"[S]ome of the patron saints of early queer activism—John Addington Symonds, Oscar Wilde, and George Ives, to name but three—celebrated ephebophilia in prose, in verse, and on canvas and practiced what they preached."

== See also ==
- Age disparity in sexual relationships
- Enjo kōsai
- Jailbait
- Statutory rape
