= Hattie Wiener =

American sexologist and media personality (1936–2024)

Hattie Wiener (also known as Hattie Retroage; May 25, 1936 – June 21, 2024) was an American sexologist, sex coach, dating coach, model, and media personality. She dated much younger men and was popularly known as "the oldest cougar".

Wiener was born in Williamsburg, Brooklyn, on May 25, 1936, and named for her father's role in the hatters' labor union. She married at 22, had children, and worked professionally as a dance teacher at the School for Creative Movement. She established a practice where she incorporated dance to help women deal with sexual issues connected to aging. When she was 55, her husband asked for a divorce and Wiener began dating younger men whom she met through personal advertisements, and later online dating sites such as Tinder.

In her 70s, she was featured as a model in Vogue and appeared on television programs such as TLC's Extreme Cougar Wives, Dr. Phil, and Inside Edition.

Wiener died on June 21, 2024, in New York, aged 88.
