= Extreme Cougar Wives =

American reality television series

- Genre: reality television show
- Directed by: Robin Acutt
- Starring: Kathy Newman; Hattie Wiener; Desmond Huey; Sheri Winkelmann; Kevin A. Herrera; Octavio Quilichini
- Composer: Sean Baillie
- Country of origin: United States of America
- Original language: English
- No. of seasons: 1
- No. of episodes: 3

Production
- Executive producers: Mark C. Grove; Fiona Kennedy; Troy P. Queen; Garry Kief; Gabriela Tavakoli
- Producer: Meg McDaniel Brown
- Cinematography: Boaz Freund; Dave Ross
- Production company: Stiletto Television

Original release
- Network: TLC
- Release: 25 November 2012 – 21 August 2013

Extreme Cougar Wives is a reality television special broadcast in the United States on TLC. It shows the romantic lives of a number of self-described "cougars"—older women who date younger men. The special aired on November 25, 2012. It was aired only 3 episodes. The special was viewed by 1.672 million viewers.
