= Sexual Abuse (journal) =

- Discipline: Sexology, criminology
- Language: English
- Edited by: Michael Seto

Publication details
- Former names: Sexual Abuse: A Journal of Research and Treatment; Annals of Sex Research
- History: 1988-present
- Publisher: SAGE Publications
- Frequency: Quarterly
- Impact factor: 3.444 (2017)

Standard abbreviations
- ISO 4: Sex. Abuse

Indexing
- CODEN: SAJTEY
- ISSN: 1079-0632 (print); 1573-286X (web)
- OCLC no.: 31272227

Links
- Journal homepage; Online access; Online archive

Sexual Abuse is a peer-reviewed academic journal that publishes articles about the clinical and theoretical aspects of sexual abuse, including its etiology, consequences, prevention, treatment, and management strategies. It is the official journal of the Association for the Treatment and Prevention of Sexual Abuse. Ronald Langevin established the journal under the title Annals of Sex Research in 1988. It adopted the name Sexual Abuse: A Journal of Research and Treatment in 1995 and then its current name in 2015. As of April 2026, the journal's interim co-editors-in-chief are Jeffrey Sandler and Sharon Kelley, who succeeded Jill Stinson.

== Abstracting and indexing ==
The journal is abstracted and indexed by Current Contents/Social & Behavioral Sciences, PsycINFO, SafetyLit, Scopus, Social Care Institute for Excellence, and the Social Sciences Citation Index. According to the Journal Citation Reports, its 2017 impact factor is 3.444, ranking it 19th out of 127 journals in the category "Psychology, Clinical" and 5th out of 61 in the category "Criminology & Penology".

== Editors ==
The journal has had the following editors-in-chief, with a one-year hiatus in 1994:

- Ron Langevin (1988–1993)
- Barry Maletzky (1995–1999)
- Judith Becker (2000–2003)
- Howard Barbaree (2004–2009)
- James Cantor (2010–2014)
- Michael Seto (2015–)
