= Justice Perverted =

Justice Perverted: Sex Offense Law, Psychology, and Public Policy
- Author: Charles Patrick Ewing
- Publisher: Oxford University Press
- Publication date: 2011
- Pages: 240
- ISBN: 978-0199732678

Justice Perverted: Sex Offender Law, Psychology, and Public Policy is a 2011 book by American jurist Charles Patrick Ewing.
