= Annual Review of Sex Research =

- Discipline: Sexology
- Language: English

Publication details
- History: 1990–2007
- Publisher: Routledge on behalf of the Society for the Scientific Study of Sexuality (United States)
- Frequency: Annual

Standard abbreviations
- ISO 4: Annu. Rev. Sex Res.

Indexing
- CODEN: ARXREJ
- ISSN: 1053-2528 (print); 2168-3654 (web)
- LCCN: 91643117
- OCLC no.: 49393326

Links
- Online archive

The Annual Review of Sex Research was a peer-reviewed academic journal published by Routledge on behalf of the Society for the Scientific Study of Sexuality. It was established in 1990 and the last independent issue appeared in 2007. Starting in 2009, the journal was incorporated in the Journal of Sex Research, with issues of the Annual Review published as special annual issues.

This periodical covered a wide range of topics about sexuality. These covered topics is far-reaching as medicine, psychology, and anthropology to topics in sexual orientation and sex in art. As an example, the 1994 edition has articles that range as wide as hormonal influence or on sexual desire in human females, to history of sex study, to how being raised in a queer family affects children, and ends with an article about sadomasochism. By comparison, the journal contains articles that range from the way mates are chosen among upper primates, to condom use, a piece discussing sexual innuendos in surrealistic paintings, the intersection of sexual identity and personality, and ends with an article talking about the neuroanatomy and physiology of ejaculation.

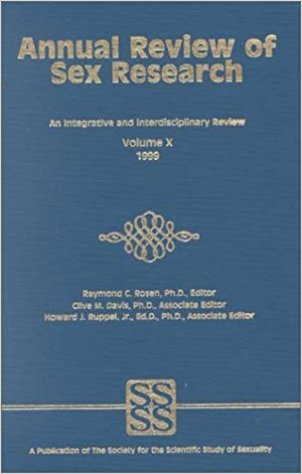
Cover of the Annual Review of Sex Research
