= Gregory M. Herek =

American psychologist

- Born: 1954 (age 71–72); Omaha, Nebraska, U.S.
- Education: University of Nebraska at Omaha; University of California, Davis
- Occupations: Psychologist, academic

Gregory M. Herek (born 1954 in Omaha, Nebraska) is a researcher, author, and professor of psychology at the University of California, Davis (UCD). He has conducted extensive research on prejudice against sexual minorities, and coined the term sexual prejudice as a replacement for homophobia to describe this phenomenon. Herek argued that using the term homophobia incorrectly assumes that negative responses to lesbian, gay, and bisexual people are founded in pathological, irrational fear (a phobia), whereas psychological research indicates they are more accurately regarded as a form of prejudice. Herek is an openly and prominent gay psychologist. Herek is considered one of the most influential scholars of sexual minorities.

== Biography ==
Herek was born in 1954, the youngest of four children. He briefly attended the University of Nebraska at Omaha, but dropped out to devote himself to political activism. He later received his B.A. degree from the University of Nebraska at Omaha, and his M.A. and Ph.D. from the University of California, Davis. He completed a post-doctoral fellowship at Yale University, followed by a year of teaching at Yale. He then joined the faculty at the CUNY Graduate Center. In 1989, he returned to UC Davis, first as a research psychologist and then, since 1999, as a tenured professor.

== Career ==
Two principal foci of his original empirical research program are societal stigma based on sexual orientation and the social psychology of heterosexuals' attitudes towards lesbians, gay men, and bisexuals. He has published at least 108 papers and chapters in scholarly journals and books, most of them related to sexual orientation, HIV/AIDS, or attitudes and prejudice. He also has edited or coedited five books and two special issues of academic journals on these topics, and he has made more than 85 presentations at professional conferences and meetings. He has received numerous federal and state grants for his research with combined budgets totaling more than $5 million.

Over the 25 years, he has reviewed manuscripts on topics related to sexual orientation for a large number of scientific and professional journals spanning a variety of disciplines, including psychology, sociology, political science, sexuality studies, gender studies, and public health. He currently serves on the editorial boards of nine professional journals and he is frequently invited to serve as an ad hoc peer reviewer for others. He is also the Executive Editor Emeritus of Contemporary Perspectives on Lesbian, Gay, and Bisexual Psychology, a book series dedicated to scientific and professional works on sexual orientation and related topics, which is published by the American Psychological Association. He reviewed book proposals and edited manuscripts that addressed research on a variety of topics related to sexuality and sexual orientation.

As a member of a peer review panel for the National Institute of Mental Health from 1992 to 1995, and as an ad hoc reviewer for NIMH and the National Science Foundation on multiple occasions since then, he has reviewed proposals requesting federal funding for projects addressing an array of research questions related to sexuality. From 1995 to 2007, he served as chairperson of the Scientific Review Committee of the American Psychological Foundation's Wayne F. Placek Award competition, which funded empirical research in the behavioral and social sciences related to sexual minorities and sexual orientation.

He oversaw the review of more than 200 research proposals from a large number of academic disciplines. At UC Davis, he regularly teach an upper-division undergraduate course on sexual orientation and has also taught graduate seminars on this and related topics.

Herek was an early advocate for scientific research on hate crimes based on sexual orientation, testifying in 1986 on behalf of the American Psychological Association (APA) for the House Criminal Justice Subcommittee's hearings on anti-gay violence. He served as PhD advisor to graduate student Karen Franklin who also studied the psychology of violence.

In 1993, he testified before the House Armed Services Committee on behalf of the American Psychological Association, American Psychiatric Association, the National Association of Social Workers, the American Counseling Association, the American Nursing Association, and the Sexuality Information and Education Council of the United States. Herek summarized the results of an extensive review of the relevant published research from the social and behavioral sciences that the research data show that there is nothing about lesbians and gay men that makes them inherently unfit for military service, and there is nothing about heterosexuals that makes them inherently unable to work and live with gay people in close quarters.

He concluded that heterosexual personnel can overcome their prejudices and adapt to living and working in close quarters with lesbians and gay men and that lesbians and gay men are not inherently less capable of military service than are heterosexual women and men. "The assumption that heterosexuals cannot overcome their prejudices toward gay people is a mistaken one," said Herek.

In the 1990s, he conducted the first federally funded scientific study to compare gay and lesbian hate crime victims with gay men and lesbians who were victimized in crimes of comparable severity that were not related to their sexual orientation. He found that hate crime survivors had significantly higher levels of depression, anxiety, and stress, compared to the other crime victims.

In recognition of this work, Herek was invited to participate in President Clinton's 1997 White House Conference on Hate Crimes, the only behavioral science researcher to be included among the invitees.

Herek's research on antigay employment discrimination was cited in 2007 congressional testimony on the Employment Non-Discrimination Act (ENDA). His policy paper reviewing social science research relevant to the debate surrounding legal recognition of same-sex couples was cited by the Chief Justice of the New Jersey Supreme Court in her 2006 written opinion in Lewis v. Harris (ruling on the constitutionality of New Jersey’s marriage law).

In 1993, he testified on behalf of the APA, the American Psychiatric Association, and four other national professional associations for the House Armed Services Committee's hearings on gays and the US military. He also assisted the APA in preparing amicus briefs in precedent-setting gay rights cases, such as Romer v. Evans and Lawrence v. Texas, and state court cases challenging current marriage laws. He testified in Perry v. Schwarzenegger trial.

Herek has also conducted research documenting the prevalence of stigma directed at people with HIV/AIDS in the United States, which has been widely cited by public health experts and legal advocates.

Herek is a Fellow of the APA and the Association for Psychological Science (APS). He was the recipient of the 2006 Kurt Lewin Memorial Award for "outstanding contributions to the development and integration of psychological research and social action," presented by the Society for the Psychological Study of Social Issues (APA Division 9). In 1996, he received the APA Early Career Award for Contribution to Psychology in the Public Interest. His other honors include the 1999 and 1989 awards for Distinguished Scientific Contributions from APA Division 44, and the 1992 Outstanding Achievement Award from the APA Committee on Lesbian and Gay Concerns.

== Selected works ==
- Out in Force (1992) ISBN 0-8039-4542-6
- Hate Crimes (1992) ISBN 0-8039-4542-6
- Stigma and Sexual Orientation (1998) ISBN 0-8039-5384-4
- Basic and Applied Social Psychology (consulting editor)
- The Journal of Sex Research (consulting editor)
- Journal of Homosexuality (consulting editor)
- Psychology of Men & Masculinity (consulting editor)
