= Barry Maletzky =

American psychiatrist

Barry M. Maletzky is an American psychiatrist. He founded the Sexual Abuse Clinic in Portland, Oregon, 1975 and served as editor-in-chief of Sexual Abuse from 1994 to 2004. He partially retired in 2007, after which he wrote a number of books. Maletzky is the author of Sexual Abuse and the Sexual Offender and Treating the Sexual Offender. He has worked at a number of organizations that help the poor, former inmates and sexual minorities.
