= Society for the Scientific Study of Sexuality =

The Society for the Scientific Study of Sexuality (SSSS, or "quad-S") is a 501(c)(3) non-profit professional membership organization "dedicated to advancing knowledge of sexuality and communicating scientifically based sexuality research and scholarship to professionals, policy makers, and the general public." SSSS was originally incorporated in 1966 as The Society for the Scientific Study of Sex, but in 1996, the name was expanded to The Society for the Scientific Study of Sexuality to better reflect the wide range of members' research interests and because the term "sex" was often interpreted narrowly to refer only to "sexual behavior". The membership includes anthropologists, biologists, educators, historians, nurses, physicians, psychologists, sociologists, theologians, therapists, and others. SSSS produces the Journal of Sex Research, a scholarly journal currently published by Taylor & Francis.

== History ==
Although the 21st Century boasts of a diversity of organizations focused on sexuality, such was not the case in the early 20th Century. As noted by Bullough, early 20th century sex research focused on social hygiene concerns, primarily the elimination of venereal diseases and prostitution. Post WWII, there was growth in interest in the field because of the research of Alfred Kinsey and researchers at the National Council of Family Relations. A need to support researchers across the United States fueled the initial development of SSSS and its journal. The individuals credited with forming SSSS were Hans Lehfeldt, Albert Ellis, Henry Guze, Robert Sherwin, Hugo Beigel, and Harry Benjamin. The supportive individuals grew to a list of Charter Members numbering 47.

The initial organizers developed a constitution stating that the Society's purpose was to (a) Unite in common organization those professionally engaged in various disciplines...who are similarly engaged in the conducting of sexual research or whose profession involves issues relating to sex; (b) To hold periodic scientific meetings for the presentation of research and to organize symposia, seminars, workshops, and conferences to consider all aspects of sexuality; (c) To publish a scientific journal...and a newsletter... and other separate publications; and d) To create a central source for those seeking research information in the field of sex science.

== Statements ==
The mission statement for the organization is as follows:

The Society for the Scientific Study of Sexuality is dedicated to advancing knowledge of sexuality and communicating scientifically based sexuality research and scholarship to professionals, policy makers, and the general public. SSSS fosters a worldwide community of diverse professionals committed to a scholarly and scientific approach to acquiring and disseminating accurate knowledge of sexuality. As a Society, we believe that freedom of inquiry is essential for the promotion of human welfare and the reduction of ignorance and prejudice about sexuality.

The ethics statement is the following:

Recognizing the responsibilities of a professional organization to society, and in accordance with its own Mission Statement, The Society for the Scientific Study of Sexuality has adopted the following statement regarding professional ethics. This statement applies to all members, regardless of membership category, in their pursuit of professional activities. All members of the Society are expected to abide by the ethical guidelines or codes of ethics of their respective disciplines, professional organizations, places of work, or educational institutions. Further, the Society strives to support the dignity of every person.

The organization has published a statement on justice, equity, diversity and inclusion.

SSSS has also published a statement of support for transgender, gender non-conforming, and gender expansive youth, and defending their access to gender-affirming care.

== Membership and growth ==
The membership of SSSS has grown over the decades from a core of members who met in the New York City area, to a current membership of hundreds drawn from 22 countries around the world.

== Organizational activities ==
=== Conference ===
SSSS hosts an annual research conference devoted to disseminating the most recent advances in sexual science. As a continuing education provider/sponsor, SSSS also offers continuing education credit hours for psychologists, social workers, and health education specialists. SSSS is particularly committed to supporting future generations of sex researchers. As such, it offers reduced membership and conference fees to students, and also provides mentorship and award/grant opportunities for students and early career professionals.

=== Awards ===
SSSS issues a number of awards annually to recognize and promote outstanding sexual scholarship and advocacy, including a Distinguished Scientific Achievement Award (prior winners include William and Virginia Masters and Harry Harlow), a Social Justice / Public Policy Award (prior winners include Betty Dodson, M. Joycelyn Elders, and David Satcher), and awards to recognize outstanding books and outstanding theoretical papers in the field of sexuality.

=== Journal ===
The Journal of Sex Research (JSR) is the official journal of The Society for the Scientific Study of Sexuality. JSR is a scholarly journal devoted to the publication of articles relevant to a variety of disciplines involved in the scientific study of sexuality. Designed to encourage research and promote an interdisciplinary understanding of the diverse topics in contemporary sexual science, JSR publishes empirical reports, brief reports, theoretical essays, review articles, methodological articles, commentaries, and letters to the editor. JSR actively seeks submissions from researchers around the world. There are nine issues of JSR published per year, which includes the Annual Review of Sex Research (ARSR). The ARSR is devoted to comprehensive reviews of current topics in sexual science.

== Controversies ==
Over the decades, there have been controversies that sparked debate and dialogue, some of it acrimonious.

Despite SSSS being grounded in science, Alfred Kinsey, one of the pioneers of data collection on human sexual behavior, did not support the founding of the organization.

John Money, a SSSS member and prominent leader in the field with a specialty in understanding the development of gender identify, was challenged by Milton Diamond, who criticized Money for his theory that gender identification could be successfully changed if done early in childhood.

In August 2020, James Cantor left the SSSS, following conflicts with other members over transgender issues. According to an article in the National Post, this occurred after Cantor was temporarily banned for an alleged pattern of bullying behavior. In an essay written to the organization, Cantor defended J. K. Rowling and other critics of the transgender community. The group's president cited a history of "abusive comments" towards other members. Cantor also resigned from an editorial position for the Journal of Sex Research. The PinkNews article covering the events noted Cantor's support for LGB Alliance, often considered a transphobic or trans-exclusionary organization.

== Recent activities ==
In recent years, the leadership of SSSS has devoted substantial attention to increasing diversity and equity in the organization. One initiative was the development of a Statement of Values and Expectations, that asserts, "Environments that are supportive, inclusive, and free from harassment, hostility, and ridicule are the most productive, and conducive to our mission of advancing sexual knowledge."

The organization has also created new committees focused on Sexual Orientation, Gender Identity, and Gender Expression (SOGIE), and on Justice, Equity, Diversity, and Inclusion (JEDI). Conference travel grants have been developed to support early career professionals from marginalized groups.
