= Behavioral Sciences & the Law =

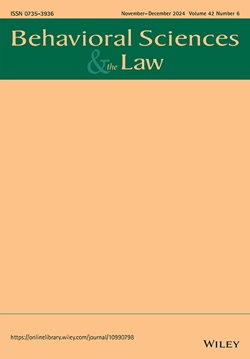
- Discipline: Forensic psychology
- Language: English
- Edited by: Charles Patrick Ewing, Alan Felthous & Christopher Slobogin

Publication details
- History: 1983-present
- Publisher: John Wiley & Sons
- Frequency: Quarterly
- Open access: Hybrid
- Impact factor: 1.3 (2024)

Standard abbreviations
- Bluebook: Behav. Sci. & L.
- ISO 4: Behav. Sci. Law

Indexing
- ISSN: 0735-3936 (print); 1099-0798 (web)
- LCCN: 83647858
- OCLC no.: 662526275

Links
- Journal homepage; Current issue; List of issues

Behavioral Sciences & the Law is a quarterly peer-reviewed academic journal covering the intersection of the law and behavioral sciences. It was established in 1983 and is published by John Wiley & Sons. The journal is edited by Charles Patrick Ewing (University at Buffalo Law School), Alan R. Felthous (Saint Louis University School of Medicine) and Christopher Slobogin (Vanderbilt Law School). According to Clarivate, the journal has a 2024 impact factor of 1.3.
