= Charles Patrick Ewing =

American lawyer

Charles Patrick Ewing is a forensic psychologist, attorney, SUNY Distinguished Service Professor, and Professor of Law Emeritus at the University at Buffalo Law School. He was Vice Dean for Legal Skills from 2009 until 2012, and for Academic Affairs from 2012 to 2014. Ewing received his Ph.D. from Cornell University and his law degree with honors from Harvard University. Before joining the law faculty, he taught at Mansfield University, where he taught psychology, and at Brandeis University, where he taught legal studies. At SUNY, Ewing has taught criminal law, evidence, torts, juvenile law, forensic science, psychology, and psychiatry and the law.

== Biography ==
Ewing is the author or co-author of ten books: Preventing the Sexual Victimization of Children; Justice Perverted; Trials of a Forensic Psychologist; Insanity: Murder, Madness and the Law; Minds on Trial; Fatal Families: The Dynamics of Intrafamilial Homicide; Kids Who Kill; When Children Kill: The Dynamics of Juvenile Homicide; Battered Women Who Kill; Crisis Intervention as Psychotherapy; and Psychology, Psychiatry and the Law: A Clinical and Forensic Handbook. He is also author or co-author of approximately seventy other publications—most of which deal with issues related to violent behavior, dangerousness, family violence and other issues in forensic psychology. He is a board-certified forensic psychologist, is licensed as a psychologist in New York and Florida, and is admitted to the bar in New York.

Ewing is Editor of the journal Behavioral Sciences and the Law. He is a Fellow of the American Psychological Association. In 2013, he served as president of the American Board of Forensic Psychology.

== Contributions ==
In 1993, Ewing received the Distinguished Contributions to Forensic Psychology Award, an award presented annually by the American Academy of Forensic Psychology. In 2001, he received the New York State Bar Association's award for outstanding contribution in the field of criminal law education. In 2003, he was named SUNY Distinguished Service Professor by the Trustees of the State University of New York.

== Books ==
- Ewing, Charles Patrick (2013). "Preventing the Sexual Victimization of Children: Psychological, Legal and Public Policy Perspectives". New York: Oxford University Press.
- Ewing, Charles Patrick (2011). Justice Perverted: Sex Offender Law, Psychology and Public Policy. New York: Oxford University Press.
- Ewing, Charles Patrick (2008). Trials of a Forensic Psychologist. New York: John Wiley & Sons.
- Ewing, Charles Patrick (2008). Insanity: Murder, Madness and the Law. New York: Oxford University Press.
- Ewing, Charles Patrick and McCann, Joseph T. (2006). Minds on Trial: Great Cases in Law and Psychology. New York: Oxford University Press.
- Ewing, Charles Patrick (1997). Fatal Families: The Dynamics of Intrafamilial Homicide. Thousand Oaks, CA: Sage Publications.
- Ewing, Charles Patrick (1992). Kids Who Kill. New York: Avon Books (paperback edition).
- Ewing, Charles Patrick (1990). When Children Kill: The Dynamics of Juvenile Homicide. Lexington, MA: D.C. Heath & Co.
- Ewing, Charles Patrick (1987). Battered Women Who Kill: Psychological Self-defense as Legal Justification. Lexington, MA: D.C. Heath & Co.
- Ewing, Charles Patrick (Ed.) (1985). Psychology, Psychiatry and the Law: A Clinical and Forensic Handbook. Sarasota, FL: Professional Resource Press.
- Ewing, Charles Patrick (1978). Crisis Intervention as Psychotherapy. New York: Oxford University Press.
