= Michael C. Seto =

Canadian forensic psychologist

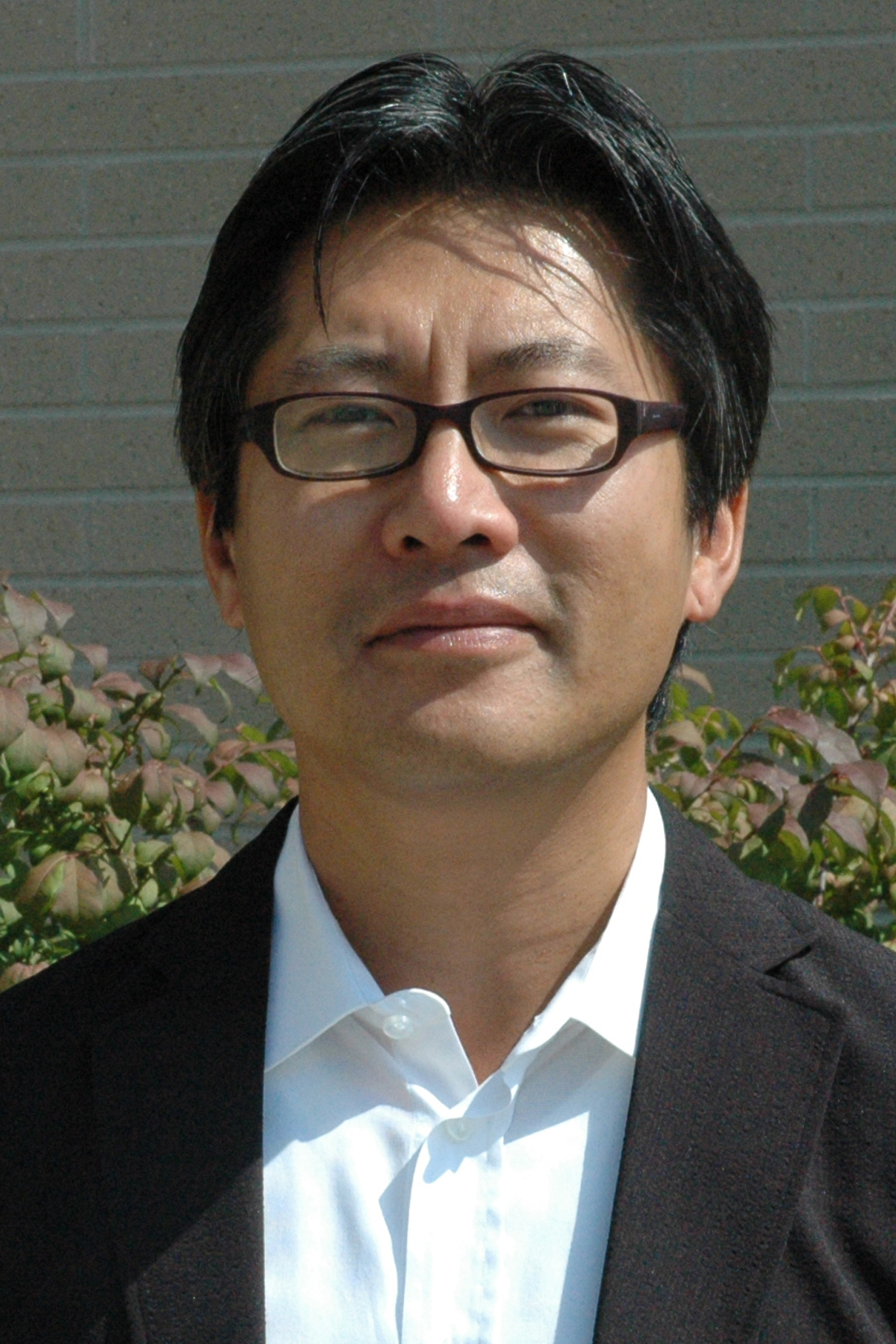
- Born: Michael Chikong Seto; 1967 (age 58–59)
- Education: University of British Columbia (B.Sc., 1989); Queen's University at Kingston (M.A., 1992; Ph.D. 1997)
- Occupation: Forensic psychologist
- Employer: Royal Ottawa Health Care Group
- Known for: Research on pedophilia and sex offenders
- Website: ca.linkedin.com/in/mcseto

Michael Chikong Seto (born 1967) is a Canadian forensic psychologist, sexologist, and author. He is director of Forensic Rehabilitation Research at the Royal Ottawa Health Care Group, where his research focuses on pedophilia, sexual offenses committed against children, child pornography, risk assessment, offenders with mental disorders, psychopathy, and program evaluation.

He is editor in chief of Sexual Abuse: A Journal of Research and Treatment, the official journal of the Association for the Treatment of Sexual Abusers, and incoming editor in chief of the Archives of Sexual Behavior, the official journal of the International Academy of Sex Research. He also serves on the editorial board for the journal Law and Human Behavior, the official journal of the American Psychology-Law Society, as well as the Journal of Sex Research. He is an associate professor at the University of Toronto and holds cross-appointments to Toronto Metropolitan University, Carleton University, and the University of Ottawa.

== Career ==
Seto received a B.Sc. (1989) in biopsychology from University of British Columbia, completed his M.A. (1992) and Ph.D. (1997) in clinical psychology at Queen's University, Kingston, Ontario, Canada. He worked at the Centre for Addiction and Mental Health (and its predecessor, the Clarke Institute of Psychiatry) from 1994 to 2008, before moving to the Royal Ottawa Health Care Group in 2008, first as a consultant and then as the director of Forensic Rehabilitation Research.

He serves as Scientific Advisor to Thorn, a company that partners across the tech industry, government and NGOs and leverage technology to combat predatory behavior, rescue victims, and protect vulnerable children. Thorn is co-Founded by Ashton Kutcher and Demi Moore.

== Research ==
Seto defined the term mesophilia, a chronophilia involving attraction to middle-aged adults in their 40s and 50s, in a 2017 literature review.

=== Chronophilias and sexual orientation ===
Seto has been noted as one of the foremost authorities on people with pedophilia. He describes pedophilia as a sexual orientation, a category that he describes as "a stable tendency to preferentially orient – in terms of attention, interest, attraction, and genital arousal – to particular classes of sexual stimuli". According to him, pedophilia can be categorized as an age-based sexual orientation in the same way that homosexuality can be described as a gender-based sexual orientation.

=== Child pornography ===
Seto described child pornography offenders as often being socially isolated, spending long stretches of time online, and being secretive about their online activities. "Several studies have suggested that child pornography offenders become increasingly involved online, sometimes spending hours every day searching for more content, as well as spending time on related sites" like youth-oriented forums or chat rooms, he said. There also appears to be an age difference, according to Seto: "People on average under 35 are more familiar with the technology than those who are over 35, and the arrests reflect that."

In 2007, Seto's research team received a $66,000 (Canadian) research grant to study child pornography offenders, comparing those who do with those who do not go on to commit future offences. Ontario politician George Smitherman criticized the study and the Ontario Mental Health Foundation for funding the project, because the study subjects would receive money for agreeing to participate ($60 Canadian). Seto responded that he was unsurprised the study has generated controversy. He said "I do understand why people are concerned about this, but I hope they don't lose sight of the fact that we're doing this research to understand pedophilia and sexual offending," and that it is standard practice to pay people to take part in clinical studies. According to OMHF, "The new knowledge to be gained from the proposed study would contribute to our theoretical understanding of the origins of sexual offending against children, because it would help identify factors that influence the likelihood that someone with a sexual attraction to children will act upon that attraction."
