= Karen Franklin =

American forensic psychologist

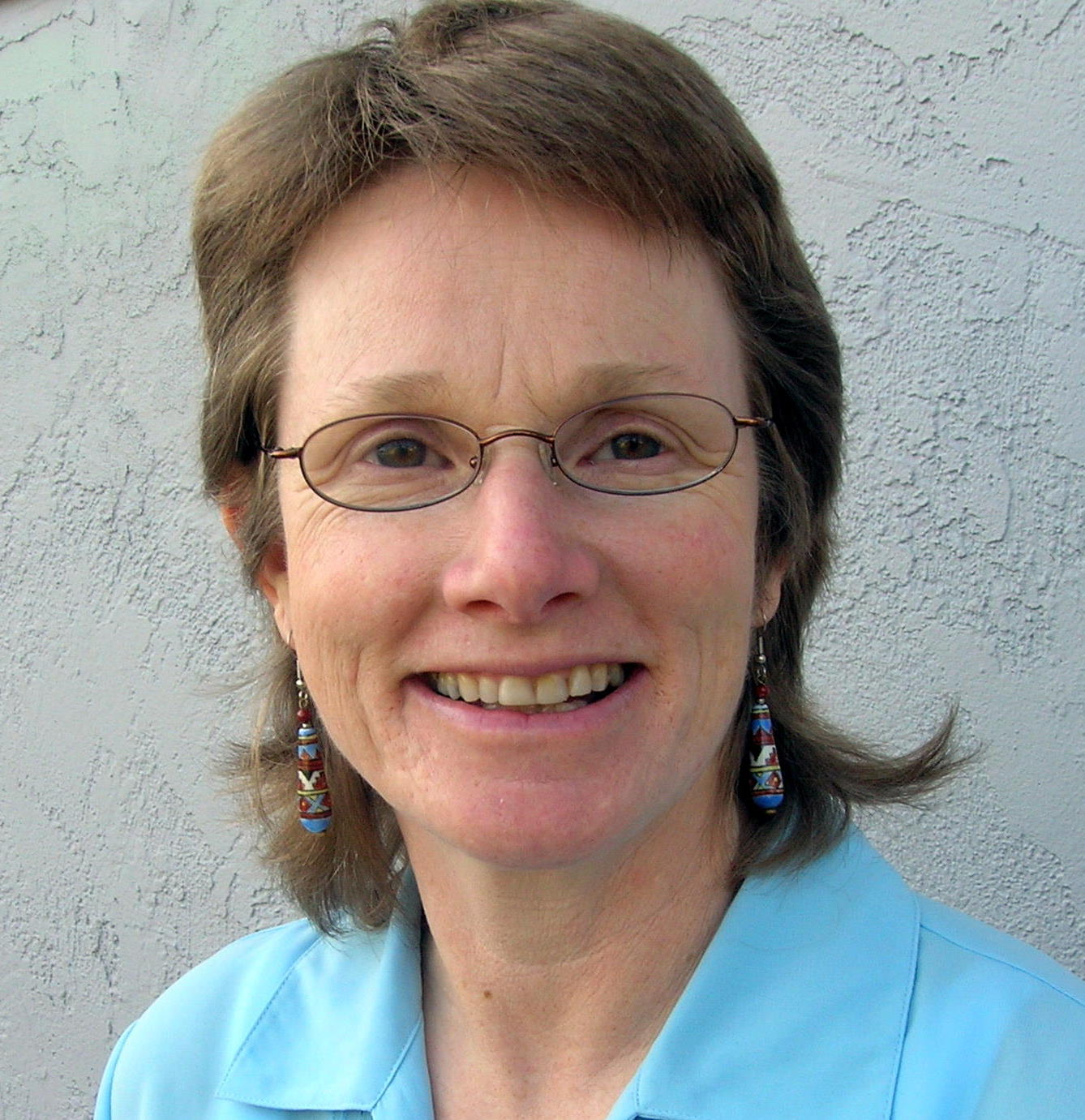
- Born: Houston, Texas, U.S.
- Education: SFSU BA 1982, CSPP (PhD); U. Wash Postdoctoral fellowship
- Awards: Distinguished Scientific Achievement (2012); Monette/Horwitz Award (2001); Guggenheim Foundation (1996)
- Scientific career
- Fields: Forensic psychology
- Workplaces: California School of Professional Psychology; Alliant International University
- Thesis: Antigay Behaviors Among Young Adults (2000)
- Doctoral advisor: Gregory Herek
- Website: karenfranklin.com

Karen Franklin is an American forensic psychologist. For her doctoral dissertation, she conducted research on anti-gay violence. She has also published commentaries about sex crimes, primarily expressing her opposition to the use of the hebephilia and other diagnoses in sexually violent predator regulations. She received the 2012 Distinguished Scientific Achievement Award in Psychology and the Monette-Horwitz Trust Award in 2001.

== Career ==
In 1982, Franklin received a BA in journalism from San Francisco State University, and at one point she worked as a legal affairs news reporter. She received her PhD in 1997 from the California School of Professional Psychology. She is an instructor of clinical psychology at Alliant International University, and serves as chair of the Ethics & Professional Affairs Committee of the Alameda County Psychological Association.

Franklin formerly worked as a criminal investigator for death penalty cases, which sparked her interest in forensic psychology. In her forensic psychology practice, she conducts competency evaluations, risk assessment, and mental state exams for criminal defendants, particularly sex offenders as well as defendants facing possible execution. Franklin has served as an expert witness in criminal trials. She was a guest expert on National Public Radio's documentary program All Things Considered, and the Public Broadcasting Service's in-depth documentary program Frontline.

== Research ==
Franklin's research focused the psychological basis for anti-gay hate crimes, hebephilia, and the interpersonal dynamics of gang rape. In addition, she published articles on subjects such as ethics in forensics issues, whether child molesters could outsmart tests, criminal justice decisions, false confessions, the nature of psychopathy, and other topics in forensic psychology. Her analysis of hate crimes identified four main motives: ideology, thrill seeking, peer dynamics and perceived self-defense; she elaborated that "offenders perceive that they have societal permission to engage in violence against homosexuals." She presented her paper Psychosocial Motivations of Hate Crimes Perpetrators to a congressional hearing in 1998. She asserted that laws to punish people who commit hate crimes may not be the best way to prevent such crimes; she argued that many criminals don't curtail their violence based on their estimate of possible future punishment. She argued in 2015 that the objectification of women can desensitize viewers to the humanity of women, but that such objectification had little direct impact on group violence. She argued that group-perpetrated violence can serve a variety of purposes for men who feel disempowered, by promoting group adhesion and camaraderie, as well as giving the members a chance to "demonstrate and celebrate their masculinity."

Franklin has also criticized the usefulness of the concept of psychopathy. In 2011, she wrote, "By foregrounding intrinsic evil, psychopathy marginalizes social problems and excuses institutional failures at rehabilitation"; she also calls diagnoses of psychopathy "essentially subjective."

Franklin questioned whether childhood behaviors such as a history of abusing animals, or setting fires, or bedwetting, sometimes called the homicidal triad, were good predictors of future psychopathic behavior; she claimed that they were less effective than commonly thought.

Franklin's forensic research has been published in Behavioral Sciences and the Law, American Behavioral Scientist, Journal of Forensic Psychology Practice, Sexuality Research and Social Policy, the Journal of Interpersonal Violence, and others, as well as in popular magazines such as Psychology Today.
