= Journal of Sex Research =

- Discipline: Sexology
- Language: English
- Edited by: Cynthia A. Graham

Publication details
- History: since 1965
- Publisher: Routledge on behalf of the Society for the Scientific Study of Sexuality (United States)
- Frequency: Bimonthly
- Impact factor: 5.141 (2020)

Standard abbreviations
- ISO 4: J. Sex Res.

Indexing
- CODEN: JSXRAJ
- ISSN: 0022-4499 (print); 1559-8519 (web)
- LCCN: 68130414
- OCLC no.: 422008152

Links
- Journal homepage; Journal page at publisher's website; Online access; Online archive

The Journal of Sex Research is a peer-reviewed academic journal covering the study of human sexuality and the field of sexology in general. It is published by Routledge on behalf of the Society for the Scientific Study of Sexuality. In 1963, the society had published a one-issue journal entitled Advances in Sex Research. The Journal of Sex Research was then first published in 1965. The editor-in-chief is Cynthia A. Graham (University of Southampton), along with Craig A. Harper, Rebecca Lievesley, & Katie Wanless (2022)

In 2020, the journal had an impact factor of 5.141. According to the Journal Citation Reports, in 2013, the journal ranked 2nd out of 92 journals in the "Social Sciences, Interdisciplinary" category, and 26th out of 111 journals in the "Psychology, Clinical" category. The journal incorporates the Annual Review of Sex Research since 2009.
