= Young Ace =

Japanese manga magazine

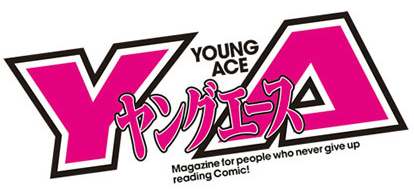

- Cover of the July 2012 issue of Young Ace, published by Kadokawa Shoten on June 4, 2012
- Categories: Seinen manga
- Frequency: Monthly
- First issue: July 4, 2009
- Company: Kadokawa Shoten
- Country: Japan
- Language: Japanese
- Website: web-ace.jp/youngace/

Young Ace (Japanese: ヤングエース, Hepburn: Yangu Ēsu) is a monthly seinen manga magazine in Japan published by Kadokawa Shoten, started in 2009. A spin-off web manga magazine titled Young Ace UP began publication in December 2015.

== Series ==
=== Young Ace ===
- Akuma no Ikenie (Devil's Sacrifice) by Ayun Tachibana
- Another by Yukito Ayatsuji
- Appare-Ranman! by Masakazu Hashimoto and Ahndongshik
- April Showers Bring May Flowers by Roku Sakura
- Bio Booster Armor Guyver by Yoshiki Takaya (on hiatus, pulled from Monthly Shōnen Ace)
- Black Rock Shooter: Innocent Soul by Sanami Suzuki
- Blood Lad by Yuuki Kodama
- Bungo Stray Dogs by Kafka Asagiri and Sango Harukawa (ongoing)
- Concrete Revolutio
- Deaimon by Rin Asano (ongoing)
- Drug & Drop by Clamp
- Erased by Kei Sanbe
- Echo/Zeon by Koushi Rikudou
- Furekurain by Terio Teri
- Haijin-sama no End Contents by Satoru Matsubayashi
- Hōzuki-san Chi no Aneki by Ran Igarashi
- ID: Invaded #Brake Broken by Ōtarō Maijō and Yūki Kodama
- Inari, Konkon, Koi Iroha by Morohe Yoshida
- Iinazuke Kyoutei by Fukudāda
- Isekai Izakaya "Nobu" by Virginia Nitōhei
- Isuca by Osamu Takahashi
- Kill La Kill by Ryō Akizuki
- Koi Suru 2DK, Ayakashi Zensai Tsuki by Roku Sakura
- Magudala de Nemure by Isuna Hasekura
- Mirai Nikki Paradox, spin-off from Future Diary featuring an alternate timeline. It lasted five chapters, finishing in February 2010.
- Mōhitsu Hallucination by DISTANCE
- More Than a Married Couple, But Not Lovers by Yūki Kanamaru (ongoing)
- Multiple Personality Detective Psycho by Eiji Ōtsuka and Shou Tajima
- The Disappearance of Nagato Yuki-chan by Puyo
- Toilet ga Hanako-san by Kawano Yuusuke
- Neon Genesis Evangelion by Yoshiyuki Sadamoto
- Panty & Stocking with Garterbelt
- Sugar Apple Fairy Tale adapted by Yozora no Udon original by Miki Mikawa (ongoing)
- Sugar Dark adapted by Kendi Oiwa original by Enji Arai
- Summer Wars
- The Ideal Sponger Life by Tsunehiko Watanabe, Neko Hinotsuki, and Jū Ayakura (ongoing)
- The Kurosagi Corpse Delivery Service by Eiji Ōtsuka and Housui Yamazaki (ongoing)
- Trump by Kenichi Suemitsu and Hamaguri
- Watari-kun's ****** Is About to Collapse (moved to Monthly Young Magazine)
- Yakumo Hakkai
- Your Forma by Mareho Kikuishi and Yoshinori Kisaragi (ongoing)

=== Young Ace UP ===
- Accomplishments of the Duke's Daughter
- The Deer King
- Do You Love Your Mom and Her Two-Hit Multi-Target Attacks?
- I Kept Pressing the 100-Million Button and Came Out on Top
- I'm Quitting Heroing
- Please Go Home, Miss Akutsu! (ongoing)
- Redo of Healer adapted by Sōken Haga; original by Rui Tsukuyo (ongoing)
- SK8 the Infinity
- So I'm a Spider, So What? (ongoing)
- The Summer Hikaru Died
- Today's Menu for the Emiya Family (ongoing)
- Wise Man's Grandchild
- The World's Finest Assassin Gets Reincarnated in Another World as an Aristocrat adapted by Hamao Sumeragi; original by Rui Tsukuyo (ongoing)
