= Lemon People =

Japanese lolicon hentai manga magazine

Lemon People レモンピープル
- Cover of January 1994 issue.
- Categories: Seinen manga (lolicon, bishōjo, hentai)
- Frequency: Monthly
- First issue: February 1982
- Final issue: November 1998
- Company: Amatriasha
- Country: Japan
- Language: Japanese

Lemon People (レモンピープル, Remon Pīpuru) was an adult lolicon and bishōjo manga magazine published by Amatriasha from February 1982 to November 1998 in Japan. The first issue had some gravure idol photographs, but the format of the magazine quickly switched to all manga by the eighth issue.

Lemon People was one of the first lolicon magazines, with the first issue's cover stating that it "had the monopoly on lolicon comic content in 1982". Lemon People was the longest-running lolicon manga magazine in Japan at the time, this record only being surpassed by Comic LO in the late 2010s. The magazine ran stories with genres that included science fiction, cyberpunk, space opera, fantasy, and horror. Other stories often involved humor and parody. Lemon People received competition from other magazines such as Manga Burikko, Manga Hot Milk, Melon Comic, and Monthly Halflita, though none of them achieved the same success.

Before Lemon People, adult comics tended to be more dramatic and serious. Lemon People changed the genre by introducing a more cute style of manga, often with less realistic storylines. Lemon People was considered the beginning of the "new wave" of lolicon manga. Throughout the 1980s and 1990s, there was a growing movement in Japan to censor magazines such as Lemon People because some viewed them as harmful to young people.

By the mid-1990s, the sales of Lemon People began to drop, and the magazine changed its format to the B5 paper size and reduced its cover price. However this strategy was not effective, and the November 1998 issue was the last one, ending a run of sixteen years and nine months.

== Manga artists published ==
Many manga artists published works in Lemon People over its nearly seventeen-year run. Following is a list of some of them:

- Shun Ajima
- Rei Aran
- Yoshitō Asari
- Hideo Azuma
- Moriwo Chimi
- Clarissa
- Dragoon
- Fukuryū
- Knife Senno
- Ryū Hariken
- Toshihiro Hirano
- Ken Hirukogami
- Hiro Hoshiai
- Narumi Kakinouchi
- KAN2O
- Kobayashi Shōnen
- Meimu
- Nekoi Rutoto (Nekoi Psydoll)
- Hikaru Nagareboshi
- Fumio Nakajima (the Lolita Anime OVAs were based on his works here)
- Ochazukenori
- Makoto Orikura
- Ruria046

== Special issues ==
Beginning with the 29th issue of Lemon People, some special themed issues started being published infrequently, including two full color mooks for the anime series Fight! Iczer One. Here is a short list of some of them:

- Bishōjo & Robot (美少女&ロボット, Bishōjo ando Robotto) (issue 29, science fiction, 15 May 1984)
- Bishōjo in Occult House (美少女inオカルト・ハウス, Bishōjo in Okaruto Hausu) (issue 35, horror, 15 October 1984)
- Lemon People Best Collection (レモンピープル/Best Collection, Remon Pīporu Besuto Korekushon) (issue 40, reprint collection of full color art and stories from past issues, 15 February 1985)
- Lemon People issues 61, 65, and 70 (1986–1987) are full color collections of original stories & art that deal with subjects like horror & fantasy.
- Lemon People Best Selection1982-1988 (レモンピープル・ベストセレクション1982-1988) (reprint collection of color art and stories from past issues, cover art: Senno Knife)

== Trivia ==
Lolita Anime, notable for being the first hentai OVA, was based on a work published in Lemon People.

Nekoi Rutoto(Nekoi PSYDOLL), who had a long-running four-panel comic strip serialized in Lemon People, was a high school girl at the time. To make an appeal, she showed up to the editorial office wearing a sailor uniform.
