= Akutsu =

Akutsu (written: 阿久津) is a Japanese surname. Notable people with the surname include:

- Chie Akutsu (born 1984), Japanese field hockey player
- Chikara Akutsu (阿久津 主税, born 1982), Japanese shogi player
- Kozu Akutsu (阿久津 浩三, born 1960), Japanese long-distance runner
- Sakiko Akutsu (阿久津 咲子, born 1998), Japanese synchronized swimmer
- Yukihiko Akutsu (阿久津 幸彦, born 1956), Japanese politician

== See also ==
- Akutsu Rapid Attack Fortress, a type of opening strategy in shogi
- Akutsu, a character in the anime series Yu-Gi-Oh! 5D
- Please Go Home, Miss Akutsu!, a Japanese manga series
