= Miki Hayasaka =

Japanese manga artist

Miki Hayasaka (早坂未紀, Hayasaka Miki; b. 5 September 1955) is an illustrator and manga artist who was born in Toyama Prefecture, Japan. After graduating from high school in 1973, he moved to Tokyo and began attending classes at Chiyoda Designer Academy, though he left before completing his degree. During the mid-1970s, he worked as a background artist for Shinji Wada, helping with works such as Sukeban Deka. He joined the dōjinshi circle Trouble Maker (トラブルメーカー, Toraburu Mēkā) in 1975, and worked as an assistant to Motoka Murakami during the mid- to late 1970s.

In August 1980, Hayasaka released his dōjinshi Fritha. In April of the following year, he was put in charge of the "My Anime Jockey" section of the first issue of My Anime, and in January 1982, he made his professional manga debut with Hara Hara Fairy in the magazine Ryū. Hayasaka is most well known for being a major artist in the lolicon manga boom in the late 1970s and 1980s. He has had stories published in lolicon magazines such as Manga Burikko, Alice Club, and Fusion Product, as well as the long-running Petit Apple Pie manga anthology.

His Maiko! series has been called a "hard bishōjo Sazae-san". His last work, Maiko! Final Run, was published in November 1989. He has since become a salaryman, and no longer publishes in the manga industry.

== Works ==
- Fritha (フリス, Furisu)
- Hara Hara Fairy (はらはらフェアリー, Hara Hara Fearī)
- Lady's Ann (レディス・アン, Redisu An) (November 1983, Tokuma Shoten)
- Maiko! (麻衣子！) (1984, ISBN 4-88570-465-0, Tokyo Sanseisha)
- Maiko! 2 (麻衣子！2) (October 1985, ISBN 4-88570-488-X, Tokyo Sanseisha)
- Maiko! 3 (麻衣子！3) (June 1986, ISBN 4-88570-504-5, Tokyo Sanseisha)
- Maiko! Final Run (麻衣子！ファイナルラン, Maiko! Fainaru Ran) (November 1989, ISBN 4-88570-576-2, Tokyo Sanseisha)
- Maiko! Mix (麻衣子MIX) (Tokyo Sanseisha)
- Selphin: The Searcher for the Runaway Cat (セルフィン 家出した猫の探し方, Serufin Iedashita Neko no Sagashikata) (1987-01-10, ISBN 4-88570-518-5, Tokyo Sanseisha)

=== Anthologies ===
Hayasaka's work has appeared in the following anthologies.

- Bishōjo Manga Best Anthology (美少女まんがベスト集成, Bishōjo Manga Besuto Shūsei) (1982-11-10, ISBN, )
- Shōnen Shōjo SF Manga Competition Complete Collection (少年少女SFマンガ競作大全集, Shōnen Shōjo Esuefu Kyōsaku Daizenshū) (multiple issues, Tokyo Sanseisha)
