= Manga Burikko =

Hentai manga magazine

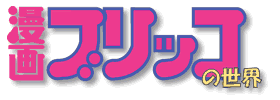

- December 1984 issue
- Categories: Seinen manga (bishōjo, lolicon, hentai)
- Frequency: Monthly
- First issue: November 1982
- Final issue: November 1985
- Company: Byakuya Shobo
- Country: Japan
- Based in: Tokyo
- Language: Japanese

Manga Burikko (漫画ブリッコ) was a lolicon and bishōjo manga magazine published by Byakuya Shobo in Tokyo from 1982 to 1985 in Japan, initially as a hentai manga magazine. The magazine was launched as a competitor to Lemon People, but it only lasted three years. The manga in the magazine were generally bishōjo and lolita manga which were mostly science fiction, parody, shōjo manga-style, anime-related, idol star related, and anything otaku related. In response to reader demand, Manga Burikko removed nude photographs of girls and explicit sex from its contents.

The term "otaku" was coined by Akio Nakamori in his short-lived "Otaku Research" (Otaku no kenkyuu) column in the magazine.

Other competing adult manga magazines include Manga Hot Milk, Melon Comic, and Monthly Halflita.

Most of the editors and contributors to the Petit Apple Pie manga anthology series also worked on (or published in) Manga Burikko. However, unlike the content in Manga Burikko, the Petit Apple Pie stories do not contain any erotic or pornographic material.

== Manga artists published ==
Manga artists who have had their works published in Manga Burikko include:

- Kamui Fujiwara
- Juan Gotō
- Yoshitō Asari (Asakari Yoshito)
- Miki Hayasaka
- Haruhiko Masuda
- Nonki Miyasu
- Aki Nakata
- Kyoko Okazaki
- Eiji Ōtsuka
- Erica Sakurazawa
- Yumi Shirakura
- Kentaro Takekuma
