= The Kurosagi Corpse Delivery Service =

Japanese manga series

- English version, volume 1

黒鷺死体宅配便 (Kurosagi Shitai Takuhaibin)
- Genre: Horror comedy, Supernatural
- Manga
- Written by: Eiji Ōtsuka
- Illustrated by: Housui Yamazaki
- Published by: Kadokawa Shoten
- English publisher: NA: Dark Horse Manga
- Magazine: Shōnen Ace (2002–2009); Young Ace (2009–present)
- Original run: 2002 – present
- Volumes: 32
- icon

The Kurosagi Corpse Delivery Service (黒鷺死体宅配便, Kurosagi Shitai Takuhaibin) is a horror manga series written by Eiji Ōtsuka and drawn by Housui Yamazaki. First published in Kadokawa Mystery, the series later (October 2006) transferred to the companion publication Shōnen Ace, and now published in the magazine Young Ace. As of June 4, 2026, 32 volumes have been published in Japan.

An English adaptation is published by Dark Horse Comics. It was first published in individual volumes until volume 14. The English adaptation then entered a long hiatus until the series was rereleased in an omnibus edition format collecting three volumes into a single book, including newly translated material.

The series follows five recently graduated university students who have formed a company which specializes in dealing with the dead and their last wishes.

A U.S. live-action film based on The Kurosagi Corpse Delivery Service is in development.

== Plot, setting and structure ==
The series deals with the exploits of five young graduates of a Buddhist college, all of whom have a special skill, some of them supernatural and/or involving dead bodies. Most notable is Kuro Karatsu who has the ability to "speak" to the recently deceased and hear their last wishes. On this basis, the group forms a business venture to fulfill said wishes in hopes for compensation. However, because corpses do not always die of natural causes or accidents, the group often encounters criminal activity or such compensation is unattainable.

The series is ostensibly set in modern-day Japan with the main characters hanging around the Buddhist college near Tokyo which they had attended, though the characters often travel elsewhere for summer jobs or to fulfill their "clients" wishes. Tokyo, usually Shinjuku, is often visited though it is not known exactly where the college is located in relation to the greater Tokyo metropolitan area. The manga also seems to be set in the same universe as MPD Psycho and Mail, other series that the authors Otsuka and Yamazaki respectively have worked on, as characters of these series appear in it.

The Kurosagi Corpse Delivery Service is structured into self-contained chapters though some successive stories, most notably the entire second volume, are one continuous story. This changes in later volumes due to a change in serialization. The stories stay self-contained, but span two or three chapters which have fewer pages than chapters at the start of the series. Most chapters are named after a Japanese pop song with each chapter in a single volume usually named for songs by the same artist. The English release by Dark Horse Comics is notable for extensive translation notes and explanations in the back of the manga. An example would be information about the artists of the songs the chapters are named for.

Starting with Volume 3, each volume of the manga features a structural drawing of a body on the cover that is relevant to one of the stories within. The cover and backcover also features a depiction of all the company members. However, only Karatsu gets a mugshot on each cover while the other characters may appear in some other manner or are hinted at. Above this depiction, they are only identified as "Staff A" through "Staff E" (with the felt puppet Kere Ellis being "Staff E'") and a description of their skill underneath. In the Japanese edition, the volumes come with a dust jacket using a paper stock similar to brown wrapping paper. Dark Horse attempted to emulate this cover style by using a similar stock for the cover of the English edition. However, starting with volume 12 Dark Horse switched to a glossier paper stock for cost cutting reasons. The original stock was reintroduced for the Omnibus versions.

== Characters ==
=== The Kurosagi Corpse Delivery Service ===
Kuro Karatsu (唐津 九郎, Karatsu Kurō)
A student Buddhist monk with average grades who shaves his head. He has the ability to "speak" with the recently deceased by the means of touching their bodies, allowing the team to learn their "clients'" desires. This skill develops over the course of the series and is linked to a spirit lingering near him named Yaichi. Involuntarily this can also lead to a temporary reanimation of the dead body touched and corpses in the immediate area, although Karatsu has no control over their actions afterwards. He is sometimes classified as an itako, although he is neither a woman nor blind.
Ao Sasaki (佐々木 碧, Sasaki Ao)
The brains behind the company, a tall woman with long black hair. A skilled hacker and general computer expert. She also has a large information network and sometimes uses bribes (such as pictures of dead idols) as the means to achieve the ends. This includes running an Internet chat-room entitled "Corpse-Chat". Besides collecting pictures of dead bodies, she also seems to enjoy literature and has recently started to attend a few psychology courses at the university.
Makoto Numata (沼田 真古人, Numata Makoto)
He uses a pendulum to dowse for the dead which enables him to find the bodies needed for the team's delivery work. Numata puts on a tough guy image including leather jackets and sunglasses, although he enjoys sides of Japanese pop culture which are rarely associated with such an image, such as interest in Japanese idol singers. He is the physically strongest of the group, but also tends to be the most emotional.
Keiko Makino (槙野 慧子, Makino Keiko)
A licensed embalmer who handles the corpses found by Karatsu and Numata. She studied her trade in America since embalmers are rare in Japan, where most bodies are cremated rather than buried. She has blonde hair and is very fashion conscious, never seen in the same outfit more than once (often Punk fashion), and also works with her skills on part-time jobs, for example on an American military base.
Yuji Yata (谷田 有志, Yata Yūji)
A timid guy who wears a felt puppet on his left hand which he claims channels an alien intelligence. He is a big nerd fond of advanced mathematics, folklore, and his apartment is filled with various sci-fi and most notably Star Wars memorabilia. Like Sasaki, he is also fairly knowledgeable about literature and urban legends. Yata's eyes are rarely seen as his hair almost always covers them.
Kere Ellis (ケレエレス, Kere Eresu)
A very foul-mouthed alien life form which communicates through Yata's hand puppet, though the group is at least in the beginning very skeptical if this alien isn't Yata himself or a split personality express via ventriloquism. Yata often apologizes for Kere Ellis' unruly behavior but has his left hand physically abused in reaction to the alien's verbal attacks nonetheless. The design of the Kere Ellis puppet changed significantly from the first chapter to the second but remained constant since.
Yaichi (やいち, Yaichi)
Yaichi is a spirit that seems to follow around Karatsu if not outright possessing him. He may be the source of Karatsu's ability or at least be able to amplify it to a great extent. The most notable of Yaichi's features are his long white hair and the severe scars on his face. One scar starts at the center-top of the face and runs down between the eyes and then down the right side. It is met below the eye by another scar coming from the right ear. A third scar runs across the left cheek starting from the corner of the mouth. Though there is no direct interaction or awareness with the group, he often helps the group with warnings or taking over some of the body movement of various characters who feel his presence during that period.

=== Nire ===
Nire is another organization specializing in postmortem services. Unlike Kurosagi, Nire is commercially successful on account of focusing on high-end services such as mummification and cryonics.

Nire (楡, Nire)
Mr. Nire is an entrepreneur in post-mortem services. At times he has run a funeral home, a mummification service and a cryogenic preservation facility, though many of his business ventures are somewhat shady. He knew about the Kurosagi Corpse Delivery Service before they met and tried to recruit them for his business.
Shinuhe (死戸, Shinuhe)
Mr. Nire's business partner in later exploits. He appears as a tall man usually in a hooded jacket. He is also covered in bandages which is explained by Mr. Nire as due to being a victim of an accident and having suffered severe burns. However, Shinuhe has also joked about being an actual resurrected Egyptian Mummy. Regardless of that, he seems to be fond of ancient Egypt either way and very knowledgeable about the process of mummification which he is eager to share.
Mutsumi Nire (楡睦美, Nire Mutsumi)
The adopted daughter of Mr. Nire. She has the unique ability to raise the dead for short periods of time, often with undesirable results.

=== The Shirosagi Corpse Cleaning Service ===
The Shirosagi Corpse Cleaning Service is a mysterious organization that on the surface is in the business to clean up murder and suicide sites. However, it appears that they are secretly after Karatsu's spirit Yaichi.

Ichiro Suzuki (鈴木 一郎, Suzuki Ichiro)
This man has the same scars as Yaichi only his hair is black except for a patch white hair above his right eye. Sasayama remarked after giving a description that he looks very much like Shingo Zuhaku (頭白 慎吾, Zuhaku Shingo), a former police coroner and serial killer Sasayama shot when he was still a cop. However, Sasayama killed Zuhaku and also witnessed his burial and thus concludes that they can not be the same person. Sasayama also remarked that the name "Ichiro Suzuki" is probably fake. When conducting business as a corpse cleaner Suzuki wears a white jumpsuit, baseball cap, safety goggles and a breathing mask, obscuring his face almost completely.
The Girl
A small, black-haired girl with a big bow in her hair usually wearing a kimono with a black leather Obi. Her character has not been named in the translated parts of story so far. She seems to be Suzuki's partner in their more nefarious activities and possesses some spiritual powers of her own, e.g. limited Telekinetic powers and the ability to converse with a group of spirits.

=== Kurosagi's recurring allies ===
Tooru Sasayama (笹山 徹, Sasayama Tōru)
Sasayama is a character by Otsuka that also appeared in MPD Psycho. In this instance he is a lot older, has a large scar on his bald head and walks with cane due to a pegleg which is evidence for Kurosagi being set years after MPD Psycho. Initially the group thinks he is a Yakuza. He is no longer a police officer but instead works for the Shinjuku municipal social welfare office and often has trouble with unidentified bodies for which he asks the group for help, usually taking advantage of them. Also, he gives them odd jobs on occasion.
Jenny Kayama (香山 ジェニー, Kayama Jenny)
Sasaki's psychotherapist who occasionally is asked by the Kurosagis to help them with a case. She apparently chose psychiatry due to her failings in medicine and reluctance to work with the physical human body. Nevertheless, she seems to be unfazed by Karatsu's ability. Though young looking Sasaki stated that Jenny is as old as Sasayama.
Yui Kikuchi (菊池 結, Kikuchi Yui)
A nurse trainee with the ability to hear the last words of a spirit before it passes on. She has two separate encounters with the Kurosagi team and seems to be romantically interested in Karatsu.

=== Other recurring and notable characters ===
Reiji Akiba (秋葉 零児, Akiba Reiji)
Akiba is a character by Yamazaki that also appeared in Mail (manga). He is a detective who also describes himself as a medium. He uses a pistol called Kagutsuchi which seals ghosts within his bullets.
The crying woman
An unnamed elderly woman with the ability to affect other people around her and force them into involuntary crying. She appears to know about Yaichi and the Shirosagi Corpse Cleaning Service and is an acquaintance of Sasayama.
Reina Gorn
A forensic entomology student from America (Ohio, to be exact) that the group meets and befriends. Her unique accent makes speaking Japanese a bit awkward. She has a fascination with insects, as well.
Tomino (富野, Tomino), Nagai (永井, Nagai) and Tezuka (手塚, Tezuka)
Three robotics students who have had repeated encounters with the KCDS by attempting to use corpses for their inventions, usually with not that great results. The trio is named after Yoshiyuki Tomino, Go Nagai and Osamu Tezuka, all of which have been called founders of subgenres of Mecha anime and manga.

== List of chapters ==
No.	Original release date	Original ISBN	English release date	English ISBN
1	November 2002	978-4-04713-527-7	August 23, 2006; August 19, 2015 (omnibus)	978-1-59307-555-2; 978-1-61655-754-6 (omnibus)
"Less than Happy"; "Lonely People"; "Magician of Lost Love"; "September Rain"
In "Less than Happy" Karatsu first meets and joins up with the rest of the group after Sasaki recognized his ability. The group find a body in Aokigahara who has recently committed suicide and wants to be reunited with his girlfriend. In "Lonely People" the group finds an old closet with a body in it on a dump. The body wishes to be taken to a place called "Dendera". During an expedition to a wrecking yard in "Magician of Lost Love", the group finds the body of a woman with severe scars stashed in the trunk of a car. However, after Makino examined the body she recognizes that the body had already been embalmed and that the scars are actually sewings. The corpse actually consists of various body parts from multiple deceased. Finally during "September Rain" the Delivery service finds a body in a sewer drain that appears to have drowned but reveals to have been killed by her partner in an insurance scam, an actuary. The group contacts the actuary but multiple attempts to meet with him fail as accidents occur to Numata and Yata.
2	November 2002	978-4-04713-528-4	February 7, 2007; August 19, 2015 (omnibus)	978-1-59307-593-4; 978-1-61655-754-6 (omnibus)
"Dangerous Duo"; "I don't care if I die"; "Watch out for that girl"; "Tonight I will pour wine all over you"; "Mona Lisa Smile"; "Do what you want"; "As time goes by"
The entirety of this volume follows one storyline that also reveals Sasaki's backstory. By accident the group picks up the casket of an executed criminal from a prison while running a normal delivery job. The casket was actually meant to be picked up by Nire Ceremony, a funeral home that cremates criminals as a public service. Sasaki later identifies the corpse to be of the man convicted of murdering her parents and one of her sisters, while she herself and another sister surviving the incident. This sister approaches Sasaki to ask her to be part of a special funeral service only Nire offers. Meanwhile Yata is hired for a part time job by that same funeral home and meets a girl named Mutsumi, the adopted daughter of the owner of the funeral home. She seems to also possess an unusual ability: To revive the dead.
3	February 2, 2004	978-4-04713-600-7	March 21, 2007; August 19, 2015 (omnibus)	978-1-59307-594-1; 978-1-61655-754-6 (omnibus)
"Crossing the River"; "Applause"; "X+Y=Love"; "Waltz"
The first and second chapter are a single story. At the beginning of it Karatsu attempts to speak to a homeless person with multiple scars and eyes that have been sewn shut identified by Numata as dead. However, the person turns out to be actually alive and walks off from the two who are fighting over the matter. About half a year later the Delivery Service finds a body that died of organ failure from rejected transplants and after turning him in at a hospital meet Sasayama for the first time. "X+Y=Love" starts out with a person answering a doorbell just to be struck with a baton and killed. Yata and Numata, on a part time job trying to get newspaper subscriptions, come across the body but the corpse appears to have suffered amnesia from the attack as Karatsu finds out when he attempts to speak to it. In "Waltz" Numata finds an ear with his dowsing ability stuck inside a manga anthology. Karatsu finds that the only thing the ear can "remember" is a song that seems to have more behind it than it appears.
4	October 29, 2004	978-4-04713-676-2	October 3, 2007; December 23, 2015 (omnibus)	978-1-59307-595-8; 978-1-61655-783-6 (omnibus)
"Thank you, dear"; "If you should die"; "The look I had 'til yesterday"; "Humble desires"
During "Thank you, dear.", the clubmembers (except Sasaki) get a summer job in a rural town called Oyamada under the lead of Sasayama's cousin who bears a striking resemblance to him, including baldness and pegleg. The town is trying to get tourism from ufology enthusiasts so the three guys spend their days making crop circles while Makino is restoring the body of an "alien" that supposedly crash landed nearby years ago. In "If you should die" all of the group except Sasaki visit an exhibition of preserved but dissected corpses for which Makino recently completed a job. After touching one of the bodies, Karatsu grows suspicious and asks Makino to pretend to have to work on one of the corpses severed heads. After further "talk" the corpse claims to have been a Japanese student that was abducted in China. Meanwhile the exhibition leaves town without a trace. In "The look I had 'til yesterday" Numata finds the key to a coin locker in a park. The group seeks out a locker and finds a dead baby in a duffel bag inside. The chapter also contains an appearance by Reiji Akiba, main character of Housui Yamazaki's previous manga Mail. Finally "Humble Desires" has the trio of guys make a trip into the country on Numata's Get-Rich-Quick-Scheme to catch rare bugs and sell them to collectors. They meet a blonde American girl named Reina who studies forensic entomology, as well as a corpse with the desire to become a bird hanging in a tree.
5	August 26, 2005	978-4-04713-749-3	December 12, 2007; December 23, 2015 (omnibus)	978-1-59307-596-5; 978-1-61655-783-6 (omnibus)
"Stand Still"; "Password to Tomorrow"; "Please give me a little love"; "Preparing for a journey"
"Stand Still" has the group finding a dead person in a retirement home. The corpse claims to be from a village called Tumani, a place from an urban legend in which a murderer killed everybody in the town and does the same to anyone who dares to enter it. While clearing out the apartment of a deceased person in "Password to Tomorrow", the boys come across a mummy in a sarcophagus. In the meantime, Nire attempts to recruit a professor of ancient history named Nishimura from the university for his new business model offering a burial service in the manner of ancient Egypt. The next story has Makino, Karatsu, Numata and Yata become professional mourners, actors who attend funerals of largely disliked people for a fee. They come across a woman that seems also to attend those same funerals and her emotional display seems to affect everyone else in the room as well. In the final chapter Sasayama hires the three boys over the summer to scout out a countryside area belonging to a senile resident of a Shinjuku public care facility said to have made billions of yen in the stock market. They come across a man in winter coat and a cave with a group of severed heads in capsules buried inside. The chapter has Nire make a return appearance, now in the business of Cryonics.
6	January 26, 2007	978-4-04713-895-7	February 27, 2008; December 23, 2015 (omnibus)	978-1-59307-892-8; 978-1-61655-783-6 (omnibus)
"A letter for you"; "If you're with me"; "The two of us"; "For whose good"; "Like a child - Kunio Matsuoka demon hunting side story (Part one)"; "Too long a spring - Kunio Matsuoka demon hunting side story (Part two)"
The first chapter has the crew return to Aokigahara to search for the corpses of suicides only to find that the service they want to perform is already being done in that region by the local post office. The next three chapters are one continuous storyline. Numata and Karatsu drive through Tokyo following Numata's dowsing and find a house where recently a corpse was discovered. A team of "corpse cleaners" named Shirosagi, a company specializing in cleaning up crime and suicide scenes, also shows up on the scene led by a man in safety goggles and a breathing mask. Later the recently evicted Numata is looking for a new place to stay and ends up in the very same room, now completely disinfected, except he finds another corpse above the ceiling tiles. The final two chapters are a side story dabbling in historical fiction set in the Japan of the Meiji era. A young Kunio Yanagita, then called Kunio Matsuoka, is visited by a scarred boy named Yaichi and that boys caretaker, one of Sasayama's ancestors with strong resemblance, while attempting to solve the mystery of a crime spree involving mutilated corpses.
7	August 25, 2007	978-4-04713-961-9	September 3, 2008; February 17, 2016 (omnibus)	978-1-59307-982-6; 978-1-61655-887-1 (omnibus)
"Fight with my heart"; "Pretty Pretty"; "My Happiness, Part II"; "My Don"; "I'm not afraid of the big bad wolf"; "Sundas is a stranger"
In "Fight with my heart" the boys are doing a delivery job for a cemetery and test out a robotic suit for a research group. In "Pretty Pretty" and "My Happiness, Part II" the Kurosagis investigate a case in which cosmetic surgery transplants have developed a mind of their own. In the final three chapters of the volume the boys accompany Makino to a gig as a make-up artist for a new movie that is being shot, trying to get some odd jobs on the set. However, the shoot is overshadowed when one of the actors turns up dead.
8	March 5, 2008	978-4-04715-052-2	January 7, 2009; February 17, 2016 (omnibus)	978-1-59582-235-2; 978-1-61655-887-1 (omnibus)
"A café in a campus town"; "Romance"; "I probably won't die"; "No need for a love song"; "An afternoon with just the two of us"; "Princess's Mirror"; "I'll go alone"
In "a café in a campus town" it's the start of a new semester on campus and the clubs are trying to recruit new members. So does the Kurosagi Corpse Delivery Service, disguised as the "Kurosagi Cash-Money-Makin' Club". Almost all interested students though seem to not be able to withstand the subject matter though, except for one girl Karatsu invited. The next three chapters are one story. The Kurosagi company has hired a part-timer due to Yata being sick. On a normal job delivering a fridge to an uptown apartment the part-timer, a homeless amateur artist, loses one of his drawings which is found by the owner of that apartment and the part-timer is hired to draw portraits for postmortem wedding ceremonies. The final three chapters start with Ms. Kikuchi, a nurse in training who has a dead body spring back to live while examining it. The body then shows the behavior typical to a baby.
9	August 5, 2008	978-4-04715-093-5	May 20, 2009; February 17, 2016 (omnibus)	978-1-59582-306-9; 978-1-61655-887-1 (omnibus)
"Key to an apartment"; "A lonely singing doll"; "Grape-colored experience"; "Tears that disappear into the sand"; "White house by the sea"; "A certain situation"; "What lies after the dream"; "My sadness"
"Key to an apartment" and "A lonely singing doll" are one story about an idol being sent dolls by a stalker. The group finds one of these dolls which Numata's pendulum reacts to as if it was a dead body. "Grape-colored experience" and "Tears that disappear into the sand" deal with the group trying to find out something about a ghost rider they encountered: A motorcycle being ridden by nothing but a floating head. The next three chapters are one continuous story in which Ms. Kikuchi listened to the last words of a politician. Via Sasayama the Kurosagi team also gets involved in this. Finally, in "My sadness" Yata and Makino are doing a part-time job doing entertainment at a Kindergarten. After the job they talk about their past and some of their backstory is revealed.
10	November 5, 2008	978-4-04715-128-4	February 17, 2010; June 8, 2016 (omnibus)	978-1-59582-446-2; 978-1-50670-055-7 (omnibus)
"Sweet challenge"; "Not on a Sunday!"; "The unreturned salinger"; "A kiss after the tears"; "Moonlight story"; "Seaside memory"; "The heart's season off"; "A mirror at 2 a.m."; "Delivery: rainbow-colored canon"
In the first four chapters the club meets up with a cyclist who is capable of using a defibrillator to reanimate the recently diseased. In the next three chapters Karatsu and Co. help Sasayama bring a retired police dog to a former colleague and uncover an urban legend. The remainder of the volume deal with Numata's backstory while he is trying to tie up things with his old master who taught him dowsing.
11	March 5, 2009	978-4-04715-204-5	September 8, 2010; June 8, 2016 (omnibus)	978-1-59582-528-5; 978-1-50670-055-7 (omnibus)
"Something missing"; "This is my hometown"; "Ugly duckling"; "We who should be loved"; "In the past, it was all day long"; "Let's make some memories"; "In order to say goodbye"; "It was sunny when I woke up"; "Angels dance"
The first six chapters are one story which begins with Sasayama hiring Makino and Yata as temp teachers (and in the process Numata as a security guard) for a private middle school, though the club quickly becomes aware that they were hired for a different purpose than teaching as a student of the school is sending warnings about attempted murders via an internet message board similar to 2channel. The story also features an incident highly reminiscent of the 2008 Akihabara massacre. The rest of the volume is a single story in which the club find a swimmer face down in a closed pool, suspected of having drowned. The person however reawakens at night and seems to be hibernating during the day.
12	November 26, 2009	978-4-04715-336-3	March 28, 2012; June 8, 2016 (omnibus)	978-1-59582-686-2; 978-1-50670-055-7 (omnibus)
"Picnic Boogie"; "Arienu Republic"; "Shadow Show"; "I'm sitin' on the edge of the skies"; "A single bound to the moat"; "In deep hurt"; "To the land of ink paintings"; "Time Machine"
In the first three chapters the KCDS encounter an insurance saleswoman who is trying to find one of her customers who she believes to have been replaced by an impostor. The next three chapters deal with a boy who lives in apartments in which people recently died, and a girl whose ghost can leave and re-enter her body at will. In the last two chapters Numata, Yata and Makino run into a doll manufacturer whose favorite doll sets off Numata's pendulum.
13	July 2, 2010	978-4-04715-380-6	November 28, 2012; August 17, 2022 (omnibus)	978-1-61655-067-7; 978-1-50671-484-4 (omnibus)
"Paper Moon"; "Silhouette Romance"; "Safari Night"; "Return My Key!"; "White Requiem"; "Island of Dreams for Two"
In "Paper Moon", "Silhouette Romance" and "Safari Night" the Kurosagi group finds out about a girl who uses a mind control device disguised as a theme park hat to punish users of online sites who attempt to pick up teenage runaways for sexual exploitation. In the next two chapters Sasaki becomes member of a jury in a murder case and meets a man who has Grapheme-color synesthesia serving on the same jury. The final chapter of the volume the group took an odd job helping to clean up a construction site where Numata promptly finds a dismembered body.
14	November 4, 2010	978-4-04715-555-8	June 24, 2015; August 17, 2022 (omnibus)	978-1-61655-739-3; 978-1-50671-484-4 (omnibus)
"You Were There Before Me"; "Quickly! Young Man"; "Distant Day"; "Hey Baby"; "A Soldier's Gamble"; "Tears of Orpheus"; "Youth Will Journey On"
In the first three chapters, KCDS deal with a third-generation politician with a dark family history and a web journalist who has a very special app on his phone - not to mention another group calling itself The Kurosagi Corpse Delivery Service. The following two chapters are the story of the "FBI Special Investigation Unit: Black Heron" DVD that Numata bought off a vendor in the street. In the last two chapters, Sasaki is doing a graduate internship with Assemblywoman Ranou looking into possible misappropriation of funds in the Ministry of Education, Culture, Sports, Science, and Technology for a project called "Drifting Cloud".
15	October 1, 2011	978-4-04715-790-3	August 17, 2022 (omnibus)	978-1-50671-484-4 (omnibus)
In the first couple of chapters, Karatsu and Co. find an old woman who is alive but believes she is dead. The second story of the volume is about a biker gang that is missing its leader. The final part of the volume deals with a boy whose parents were murdered by a member of a doomsday cult, and also deals with the 2011 Tōhoku earthquake and tsunami.
16	July 2, 2012	978-4-04120-288-3	October 13, 2026 (omnibus)	978-1-50674-031-7 (omnibus)
17	February 1, 2013	978-4-04120-562-4	October 13, 2026 (omnibus)	978-1-50674-031-7 (omnibus)
18	October 3, 2013	978-4-04120-886-1	October 13, 2026 (omnibus)	978-1-50674-031-7 (omnibus)
19	April 3, 2014	978-4-04121-020-8	—	—
20	October 31, 2014	978-4-04102-236-8	—	—
21	April 27, 2016	978-4-04103-084-4	—	—
22	April 4, 2018	978-4-04-106713-0	—	—
23	May 2, 2018	978-4-04-106714-7	—	—
24	December 4, 2018	978-4-04-107488-6	—	—
25	July 4, 2019	978-4-04-108240-9	—	—
26	December 28, 2019	978-4-04-108932-3	—	—
27	July 4, 2020	978-4-04-109638-3	—	—
28	December 28, 2020	978-4-04-110929-8	—	—
29	June 4, 2024	978-4-04-114828-0	—	—
30	February 4, 2025	978-4-04-115783-1	—	—
31	August 4, 2025	978-4-04-116416-7	—	—
32	June 4, 2026	978-4-04-117360-2	—	—

== Other appearances ==
Karatsu and Makino appeared in the movie adaptation of the Fatal Frame series which was released on September 26, 2014.
