= Lolita (term) =

English-language term from Nabokov's Lolita

"Lolita" is an English-language term defining a young girl as "precociously seductive". It originates from Vladimir Nabokov's 1955 novel Lolita, which portrays the narrator Humbert's sexual obsession with and victimization of a 12-year-old girl whom he privately calls "Lolita", the Spanish nickname for Dolores (her given name). Unlike Nabokov, however, contemporary writers typically use the term "Lolita" to portray a young girl who attracts adult desire as complicit rather than victimized.

The term's meaning and use in Japanese differs substantially from the English, and has developed instead into a positive synonym for the "sweet and adorable" adolescent girl. The usage stems from the romanticization of Japanese girls' culture, and forms the compounds lolicon and Lolita fashion.

== Nabokov's Lolita ==
Justifying his attraction to twelve-year-old Lolita, Humbert claims that it was a natural response to the "demoniac" nature of children who attract him:

Now I wish to introduce the following idea. Between the age limits of nine and fourteen there occur maidens who, to certain bewitched travelers, twice or many times older than they, reveal their true nature which is not human, but nymphic (that is, demoniac); and these chosen creatures I propose to designate as 'nymphets.'

Nabokov, however, does not endorse Humbert's fantasy that Lolita is a seductress. As Perry A. Hinton notes:

At no point is Lolita anything but a typical girl of her age and time: tomboyish (she has a tendency not to wash her hair), interested in movies, celebrities, magazines, and soda pop. She does nothing to attract Humbert in any way. She does not dress or make herself up with any thought to attract him.

Eric Lemay of Northwestern University writes:

And in his arms or out, "Lolita" was always the creation of Humbert's craven self... The Siren-like Humbert sings a song of himself, to himself, and titles that self and that song "Lolita". ... To transform Dolores into Lolita, to seal this sad adolescent within his musky self, Humbert must deny her humanity.

== Other English-language usage ==
Young girls who attract adult sexual desire are called "Lolitas" when writers imply the young girl is "precociously seductive", and therefore to blame for the adult's desire. This usage reflects the self-justification of Nabokov's narrator Humbert Humbert, but it is far from Nabokov's portrayal of Lolita, which makes clear she is Humbert's victim, not his seductress.

In the marketing of pornography, "Lolita" is used to refer to the sexualized presentation of a young girl, frequently one who has only recently reached the age of consent, appears to be younger than the age of consent, or child exploitation material depicting the sexual abuse of children.

== Use in Japanese ==
The meaning of the term "Lolita" in Japanese is divergent from Nabokov's novel, and instead stems from the positive idealization and romanticization of girls' culture (shōjo bunka) developed from the Meiji period to the 20th century: an "innocent and ethereal creature, who deserves adoration from others while staying entirely passive". Girls' culture in Japan, reflected in cultural traditions such as the all-female Takarazuka Revue and shōjo manga (girls' comics), was influenced by the traditions of Romanticism. Nabokov's Lolita, first translated to Japanese in 1956, was interpreted by readers primarily as a story of Humbert entering the peaceful and unearthly world of the shōjo, rather than through the lens of perverse desire and abuse.

When discussing Lolita fashion culture, some writers use the term "lolita" or "Lolita" to describe clothing, as in "wearing lolita." Some writers refer to women who wear such clothing as "Lolitas" but with little connection to the Nabokov novel or to sexualized usage of the term:

Actually, there are quite a number of Japanese Lolitas who do not know about the Nabokov novel. I remember explaining it to someone and she was completely disgusted. Lolita is a modest style. Lolitas dress for themselves. It is clothing that reminds us that not everything has to do with trying to attract or please men.

Lolita fashion is a subculture of cute (see kawaii) or delicately feminine appearance reflecting what Hinton suggests is "an idyllic childhood, a girl’s world of frilly dresses and dolls." The style, strongly influenced by Victorian and Roccoco fashions, is characterized by full skirts and petticoats, decorated with lace and ribbons. Words commonly used to describe the style include "porcelain doll", "delicate", and "childlike". Within the general Lolita style are variations of the fashion, such as "Gothic Lolita", "Sweet Lolita", "Hime (or Princess) Lolita", and "Punk Lolita". These few by no means complete the list of variations. Men who dress in the fashion are called "brolitas."

== See also ==
- Adolescent sexuality
- Bishōjo
- Ephebophilia
- Hebephilia
- Lolita complex
- Lolita fashion
- Pedophilia
- Jailbait
