= Meimu =

Japanese manga illustrator (born 1963)

- Born: Kō Uchiyama; 24 September 1963 (age 63) Kanagawa Prefecture, Japan
- Areas: Manga artist, illustrator
- Pseudonym: Mei Mu

Meimu (or Mei Mu, born 24 September 1963), real name Kō Uchiyama (内山 孝, Uchiyama Kō), is a Japanese manga artist. While attending classes at Osaka University of Arts, he made his debut as a manga artist. Meimu's talents have been featured in various genres of storytelling, from science fiction to horror. Some of his works have also appeared in the adult manga magazine Lemon People and the manga anthology series Petit Apple Pie. His wife is manga artist Misuzu Suzuki.. Meimu was the character designer for the first Star Ocean video game.

== Works ==
| Title | Year | Notes | Refs |
|---|---|---|---|
| Kikaider 02 Code: Zero Two | | Illustrations, Original by Shotaro Ishinomori. Published by Kadokawa Comics Ace in 7 volumes | |
| Melty Lemon for boys (メルティ・レモン FOR BOYS) | | Additional material, Published by Jets Comics, 6 volumes | |
| Gasaraki | | Illustrations, Original by Hajime Yatate, Ryosuke Takahashi. Published by Kadokawa Comics Ace, 4 volumes | |
| Death Mask | | Published by Comp Comics, 4 volumes | |
| (DEATHMEIMUホラーシリーズ ／ 仮面の章; DEATHMEIMU horror series / mask of the chapter) | | Published by Kadokawa Comics Ace, 4 volumes | |
| Powered Miyuchan | | Published in 2 volumes | |
| (DEATH SHADOW黒の黙示録; Death Shadow Black Apocalypse) | | Published by Bunkasha comics young in 2 volumes | |
| (スカルマン; Skull Man) | | Illustrations. Authored by Shotaro Ishinomori. Published by Magazine Z KC in 2 volumes | |
| Mobile Suit Gundam MS Igloo 2: Gravity Front | | Illustrations, Authored by Hajime Yatate, Yoshiyuki Tomino. Published by Kadokawa Comics Ace in 2 volumes | |
| Mobile Suit Gundam MS Igloo 603 | | Illustrations, Authored by Hajime Yatate, Yoshiyuki Tomino. Published by Kadokawa Comics Ace in 2 volumes | |
| Inazuman vs Kikaider: The End Of Kikaider 02 | | Illustrations, Authored by Shotaro Ishinomori. Published by Kadokawa Comics SFX A in 2 volumes | |
| (ぱすてるぽいんと; Pastel point) | | Published in Boy Captain Comics, 2 volumes | |
| (仮面ライダー龍騎13 Riders the comic; Masked Ride Riyuki 13 Riders the Comic) | | Illustrations, authored by Shotaro Ishinomori. Published by Kadokawa Comics Ace, 1 volume | |
| Fancy | | Published in World Comics Special, Fancy comics 14 | |
| House of the Horror | | Published in 1 volume. | |
| Kiss. | | Original story by Imazeki Akemi and Oshima Taku, Published by Dengeki Comics EX, 1 volume | |
| (ネオ昆虫世紀コーカサス; Neo Insect Century Caucaus) | | Published ASCII Comics, 1 volume | |
| (卒業写真; Graduation Photo) | | Published by Comp Comics, 1 volume | |
| (玩具修理者; Toy Repair Person) | | Manga. Original story by Taizo Kobayashi. Published by Kadokawa Comics Ace Extra, 1 volume | |
| (ぷっぷくマロロン; Pu~tsupuku Maroron) | | with Sasaki Misuzu. Published by Pitchi Comics, 1 volume | |
| (天空伝説リニアタス; Sky Legend Riniatasu) | | Published by Boy King Comics, 1 volume | |
| (ラプラスの魔; Laplace of magic) | | Published by Comp Comics, 1 volume | |
| (MEIMU IN THE WORLDMEIMU初期作品集; Meimu in the World: Meimum Initial Works) | | Published by Return Festival, 1 volume | |
| Silk Screen: Meimu in the World | | Published by World Comics Special, 1 volume | |
| Mobile Suit Gundam MS IGLOO Apocalypse 0079 | | Manga. Original story by Hajime Yatate, Yoshiyuki Tomino. Published by Kadokawa Comics Ace, 1 volume | |
| (魔導士スドウ; Mashirube-shi Sudou) | | Published by Animage Comics, 1 volume | |
| (レシーブ; Receive) | | Published by Boy Captain Comics, 1 volume | |
| Ju-on (呪怨; The Grudge) | | With Rinno Miki. Original story by Takashi Shimizu. Published by Paperback Comics, 1 volume | |
| (リング死; Ring Death) | | Illustration. Original story by Koji Suzuki, screenplay by Hiroki Takahashi, 1 volume | |
| Ring 0: Birthday (リング0バースデイ) | | Animation. Original story by Koji Suzuki, screenplay by Hiroki Takahashi, 1 volume | |
| Ring 2 (リング2) | | Animation. Original story by Koji Suzuki, screenplay by Hiroki Takahashi, 1 volume | |
| (スーパーコンプ; Super Comp) | | Additional contributions. Published by Comp Comics, 1 volume | |
| Sadako (貞子) | | Manga. Original story by Takashi Shimizu, screenplay by Fujioka YoshiNobu, EiTsutom, Published by Kai comics 1 volume | |
| (呪詛蛇-jyusohebi-; Curse snake - jyusohebi-) | | Published by Action Comics, 1 volume | |
| Co-Doku Game | | Published by Action Comics, 1 volume | |
