= Lighthouse: Center for Human Trafficking Victims =

Japanese non-governmental organization

- Formation: August 2004; 22 years ago
- Founder: Shihoko Fujiwara
- Type: NGO
- Purpose: Combat human trafficking and slavery
- Headquarters: Tokyo, Japan
- Location: Japan
- Region served: Japan
- Official language: Japanese
- Director: Shihoko Fujiwara
- Main organ: Board of Directors
- Website: Official website

Lighthouse: Center for Human Trafficking Victims (Japanese: 人身取引被害者サポートセンター ライトハウス) is a nonprofit organization based in Tokyo, Japan working to eradicate human trafficking and modern day slavery. It used to be known as "Polaris Project Japan" (ポラリスプロジェクトジャパン).

== History and purpose ==
Lighthouse was founded in August 2004 by Shihoko Fujiwara. The following year, Lighthouse established the only nationwide consultation hotline for trafficking victims and those wishing to report possible trafficking activity in Japan. Since then, the consultation hotline has been used as a source of trafficking tips throughout the nation. The hotline provides consultations to about a hundred victims or family members annually.

In addition to maintaining its consultation and tip hotline, the organization engages in public awareness and advocacy work. For example, the Director called for animated or drawn materials depicting children under 18 clearly created for the purpose of fulfilling sexual excitement (such as lolicon manga) to be regulated as child pornography.

== Honorable recognition ==
In 2011, Lighthouse's Director and Founder Shihoko Fujiwara was named one of the "100 People Remaking Japan" by Aera Magazine, and in 2012 she spoke about the Japanese sex trade at the TED@Tokyo Talent search.
