= Mugen Shinshi =

Japanese manga series

夢幻紳士
- Genre: Mystery
- Manga
- Written by: Yosuke Takahashi
- Published by: Asahi Sonorama
- Magazine: Manga Shonen
- Original run: January 1981 – December 1982
- Volumes: 1
- Manga

Mugen Shinshi Bōken Katsugeki-hen
- Written by: Yosuke Takahashi
- Published by: Tokuma Shoten
- Magazine: Betty
- Original run: August 15, 1982 – October 18, 1990
- Volumes: 10
- Original video animation

Mugen Shinshi Bōken Katsugeki-hen
- Directed by: Hatsuki Tsuji
- Produced by: Akio Wakana; Tomoko Sato
- Written by: Izo Hashimoto
- Studio: Gallop; JVCKenwood Victor Entertainment
- Released: February 21, 1987
- Runtime: 50 minutes
- Manga

Mugen Shinshi Kaiki-hen
- Written by: Yosuke Takahashi
- Published by: Tokuma Shoten
- Magazine: Medium; Shonen Captain
- Original run: April 1982 – June 1991
- Volumes: 1
- Manga

Mugen Shinshi Mugen Gaiden
- Written by: Yosuke Takahashi
- Published by: Asahi Sonorama
- Magazine: Nemuki
- Original run: 1992 – 1996
- Volumes: 3
- Manga

Mugen Shinshi Gensho-hen/Oma-hen/Meikyu-hen
- Written by: Yosuke Takahashi
- Published by: Hayakawa Shobo
- Magazine: Mystery Magazine
- Original run: March 25, 2004 – February 15, 2007
- Volumes: 3
- Live-action film

The Dream Manipulator Mugen
- Directed by: Misako Unakami
- Studio: Beach Walkers Collection
- Released: June 26, 2021
- Runtime: 92 minutes

Mugen Shinshi (Japanese: 夢幻紳士, Hepburn: Mugen Shinshi; "Dream Gentleman") is a Japanese manga metaseries by Yosuke Takahashi. The story follows the adventures of Mamiya Mugen, a teenage detective from the Showa era Japan, retold in multiple alternate continuities. The second and main series was loosely adapted into an OVA in 1987, while a live action film The Dream Manipulator Mugen was released in 2021.

== Plot ==
The first manga series introduces Mamiya Mugen, the child heir of a rich family that enjoys solving crimes for the Japanese police during the Showa era. Although young, he has telepathic powers and a keen intellect, and is helped by his faithful butler Alucard. Some of the cases he gets involved with are occult or supernatural in nature.

The series was revamped for the second manga publishing, Boken Katsugeki-hen, where the story remains almost the same, although containing more gags and humor. Mugen lacks any superpower now, and solves cases with the help of his butler Alucard and his love interest Atsuko. However, the shady story of his family intervenes as well, forcing him to confront his villainous father and aunt. This iteration of the series received an OVA whose story conflates and references several of the manga's chapters.

A much more serious, almost horror-oriented view of the series is given in its third continuity, Kaiki-hen, where Mugen is now a suave, distinguished ladies man in his twenties. He works mostly alone and meets a long string of lovers in his cases, but is helped by his spiritual powers and his mentor Professor Yokomizo. This style was kept in the work's fourth version, in which Mamiya has a different set of powers.

The last series is the trilogy Gensho-hen/Oma-hen/Meikyu-hen, in which Mugen is presented as a supernatural entity unrelated to humanity that fights monsters and demons.

== Characters ==
Mamiya Mugen (夢幻魔実也)
Voiced by: Keiko Toda
A child detective who solves crimes with his genius mind (and in some continuities, his supernatural powers). He wears a black suit and sometimes a matching bowler hat, and while his personality often changes between series, he is always boyish and quirky. He's 15 in Katsugeki-hen, where he is also a master of disguise and a good shooter. He abandons Japan with the outbreak of World War II, but returns years later, married to Atsuko and having a daughter named Mako.
Alucard (アルカード)
Voiced by: Banjo Ginga
Mamiya's butler, a huge, bald old man with a surprising strength. Katsugeki-hen reveals he was born in Transylvania and has vampiric blood, but swore loyalty to the Mamiya family after Kyoshiro saved his life during World War I. His name is Dracula backwards.
Inspector Edogawa (江戸川 警部)
Voiced by: Junpei Takiguchi
Mamiya's liaison in the Tokyo Metropolitan Police Department, a bumbling man who often becomes skeptical or cowardly at his plans. His name comes from Edogawa Ranpo.
Atsuko Fukune (福音温子)
Voiced by: Hiroko Emori
Introduced in Katsugeki-hen, Atsuko is a girl Mamiya meets during one of his cases, after which she becomes his sidekick and eventually his wife. An orphan, she used to earn a living as an exotic dancer in Asakusa. She's intelligent and determined, though quite short-tempered and a bit uncultured.
Mako Mugen (夢幻魔子)
The daughter of Mamiya and Atsuko. During the 1950s, she starts working as a Japanese vigilante named Tokyo Kid.
Kyoshiro Mugen (夢幻狂四郎)
Mamiya's father, introduced in Katsugeki-hen. He is a professional delinquent, which brings Mamiya troubles to no end, though he sincerely loves his son and wife. At the end of the story, it is revealed that he used to be a friend of Adolf Hitler.
Yukie Mugen (夢幻雪絵)
Mamiya's mother, an elegant woman constantly infuriated by her husband's antics.
Neko Mugen (夢幻猫)
Mamiya's aunt, a beautiful femme fatale murderer.
Dr. Lao (老博士)
Voiced by: Joji Yanami
Another enemy to Mamiya, a Chinese mastermind. He's ostensibly a parody of Fu Manchu, though his face is officially based on popular Japanese actor Akira Oizumi, while his name comes from Charles G. Finney's The Circus of Dr. Lao.
Koho (甲保)
Voiced by: Koji Totani
Dr. Lao's main henchman, a plump Chinese man. Though he looks stupid, he can be surprisingly competent. He's a parody of Japanese professional wrestler Thunder Sugiyama.
Kaitō Kurenai Okoze (怪盗紅オコゼ)
Another of Mamiya's enemies, a phantom thief (怪盗, kaitō) of unknown identity.
Prof. Yokomizo (横溝教授)
A scientist who understands psychic abilities. He only appears in the first chapters of Kaiki-hen.
