= Petit Apple Pie =

Japanese manga series

- Cover of Bishōjo Manga Best Anthology, the title for the first issue.

プチアップル・パイ (Puchi Appuru Pai)
- Manga
- Written by: Various
- Published by: Tokuma Shoten
- Original run: November 10, 1982 – March 10, 1987
- Volumes: 18

Petit Apple Pie (Japanese: プチアップル・パイ, Hepburn: Puchi Appuru Pai) is an 18-volume non-erotic bishōjo lolicon manga anthology series published by Animage Comics from November 10, 1982, to March 10, 1987. The first volume was released under the name Bishōjo Manga Best Anthology (美少女まんがベスト集成, Bishōjo Manga Besuto Shūsei), before the series was renamed to Petit Apple Pie with the original title as a subtitle.

The series primarily featured works from editors and contributors to the erotic lolicon magazine Manga Burikko, but did not itself include any erotic or pornographic stories.

== Artists ==
Following is an alphabetical list of some of the artists who published stories in the Petit Apple Pie series.

- Abyūkyo
- Apple House
- Yoshito Asari
- Hideo Azuma
- Chibakonami
- Hisashi Eguchi
- Kamui Fujiwara
- Kasumi Gotō
- Miki Hayasaka
- Yōko Hino
- Fujihiko Hosono
- I.N.U
- Jun Ishikawa
- Akira Kagami
- Megumi Kawaneko
- Kei Kazuna
- Marchen Maker
- Meimu
- Noa Misaki
- Tōru Mizushima
- Usagi Morino
- Chimi Moriwo
- Noriko Nagano
- Ai Naniwa
- Meiru Notsugi
- Yukao Oki
- Jun Saegusa
- Yumi Shirakura
- Yoshihisa Tagami
- Chiko Takahashi
- Yōsuke Takahashi
- Miki Tori
- Shinji Wada
