= Kamui Fujiwara =

Japanese manga artist

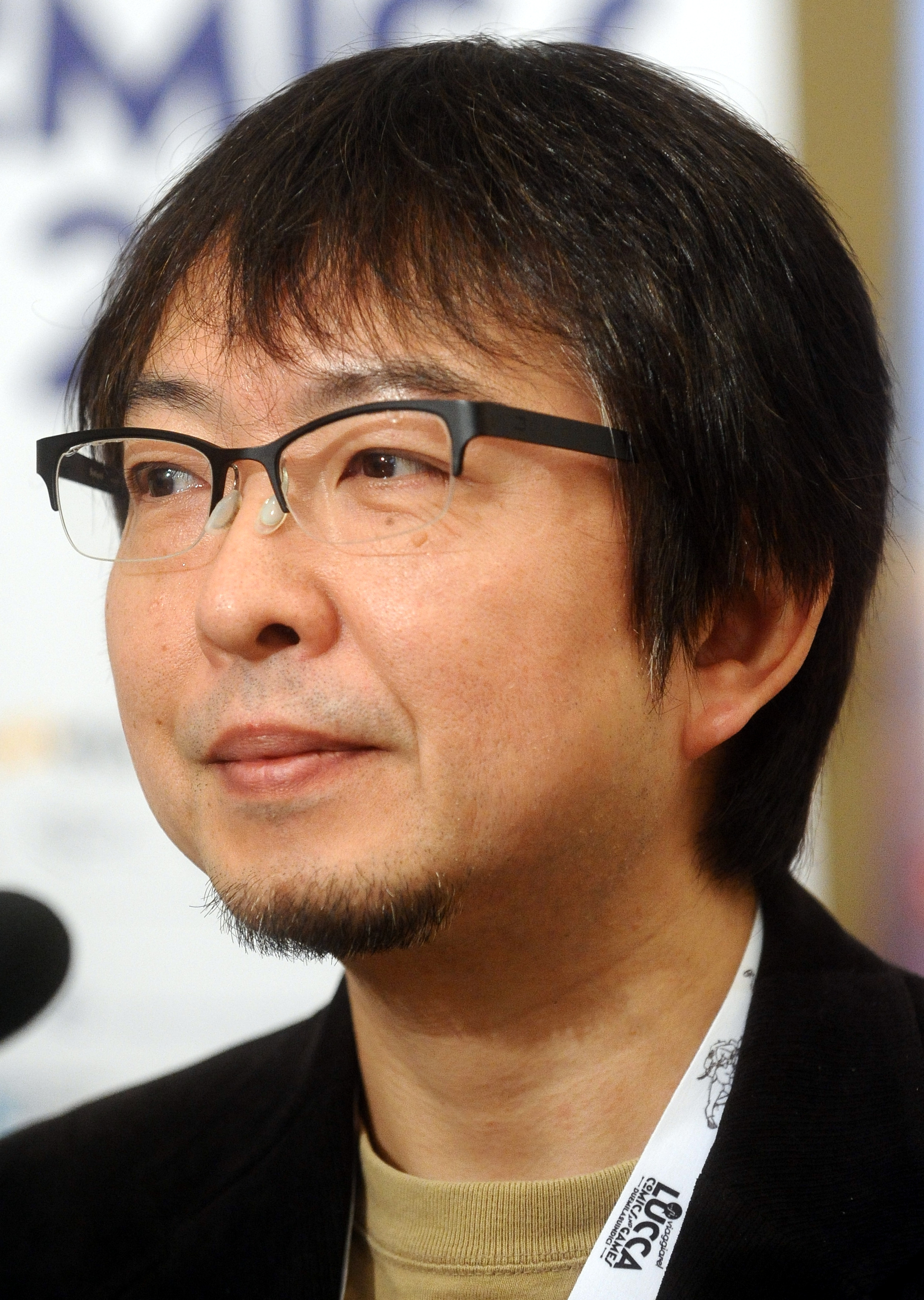
Kamui Fujiwara at Lucca Comics and Games 2015

Kamui Fujiwara (藤原 カムイ, Fujiwara Kamui; born September 23, 1959 in Arakawa, Tokyo, Japan) is a Japanese character designer and manga artist. Fujiwara's father was a soldier in the Imperial Japanese Army during World War II. He graduated from the Kuwasawa Design School. Fujiwara won an honorable mention in 1979 for his debut manga titled Itsu mo no Asa ni in the 18th Tezuka Award along with Toshio Nobe (also an honorable mention) and Tsukasa Hojo, who won the top prize awarded. He was heavily influenced by Katsuhiro Otomo, and a defining feature of his work is the fine attention to detail. His pen name "Kamui" has its origins in the name of the Ainu god of creation, Kamuy, and he has used it since high school. He has had stories published in the manga anthology series Petit Apple Pie.

== Works ==
=== Manga ===
- Buyo Buyo
- "Chameko" (published in Manga Burikko)
- Chocolate Panic
- Clip
- Color Mail
- Deja Vu
- Dragon Quest: Warriors of Eden
- Dragon Quest Retsuden: Roto no Monshō
  - Dragon Quest Retsuden: Emblem of Roto Returns
  - Dragon Quest Retsuden: Emblem of Roto: Monshō o Tsugumono-tachi e
- Drop
- Fukugami Chōkidan
- H_{2}O (published in Manga Burikko)
- Hot Ai-Q
- Hyōi
- Kanata e
- Kenrō Densetsu: Kerberos Panzer Cops (written by Mamoru Oshii)
- Oine (published in Manga Burikko, originally created by Kentarō Takekuma)
- Old Testament: Genesis Books I & II (initially published by Core, republished by Tokuma Shoten)
- Raika (created by Yū Terashima)
- Saiyūki
- Shifuku Sennen
- Sōseiki
- St. Michaela Gakuen Hyōryūki (created by Ei Takatori)
- Teito Monogatari
- Ultra Q
- Unlucky Young Men
- Yūtopia

=== Video games ===
- Bōken Shōnen Kurabu ga Hou (character designer)
- Grandia Xtreme (character designer)
- World Neverland (character designer)
- Gēmu Nihonshi Tenkabito: Odanobunaga (character designer)
- Gēmu Nihonshi Tenkabito: Hidekichi to Ieyasu (character designer)
- Terranigma (art director)
- 46 Okunen Monogatari: Harukanaru Eden E (Japanese version cover art)
