= April Showers Bring May Flowers =

Japanese manga series

- First tankōbon volume cover, featuring (from left to right) Sumire Uguisudani, Hana Tabata, and Yosuke Ueno

ブスに花束を。 (Busu ni Hanataba o)
- Genre: Romantic comedy
- Manga
- Written by: Roku Sakura
- Published by: Kadokawa Shoten
- English publisher: NA: Yen Press
- Imprint: Kadokawa Comics A
- Magazine: Young Ace
- Original run: April 4, 2016 – September 2, 2022
- Volumes: 13
- Manga

April Showers Bring May Flowers: Bloom
- Written by: Roku Sakura
- Published by: Kadokawa Shoten
- Magazine: Young Ace
- Original run: March 4, 2025 – September 4, 2025
- Anime television series
- Directed by: Mirai Minato
- Written by: Mirai Minato
- Music by: Yuki Hayashi; Shogo Yamashiro
- Studio: Silver Link
- Licensed by: NA: Amazon Prime Video
- Original network: Tokyo MX, MBS, BS NTV
- Original run: July 4, 2025 – September 26, 2025
- Episodes: 13
- icon

April Showers Bring May Flowers (Japanese: ブスに花束を。, Hepburn: Busu ni Hanataba o; lit. 'Bouquet for an Ugly Girl') is a Japanese manga series written and illustrated by Roku Sakura. It was serialized in Kadokawa Shoten's seinen manga magazine Young Ace from April 2016 to September 2022, with its chapters collected in 13 tankōbon volumes. An anime television series adaptation produced by Silver Link aired from July to September 2025.

== Synopsis ==
Hana Tabata, a first-year high school student who calls herself ugly, goes to school early to replace the flowers arranged in a vase in her classroom as part of her daily routine. She becomes so immersed that she has leftover flowers in her hair and is seen by Yosuke Ueno, who had been thinking about who had been changing the flowers. Though she runs away in embarrassment, he starts talking to her.

== Characters ==
Hana Tabata (田端 花, Tabata Hana)
Voiced by: Saori Hayami
First-year high school student. She is quiet and kind-hearted but thinks she is ugly. She has poor eyesight and is slightly overweight. Since she was young, she was ridiculed as being "ugly", which affected her current personality. She loves shōjo manga and romance games about women. After admiring the heroine of a shōjo manga, her interest in flowers grew and she became a member of the beautification committee.
Yosuke Ueno (上野 陽介, Ueno Yōsuke)
Voiced by: Shimba Tsuchiya
The most popular guy in the class. He belonged to the basketball club in junior high school and is popular with girls. He works part time at an okonomiyaki restaurant. He was worried about the flowers in the classroom, but discovered Hana had been rearranging the flowers and began talking to her.
Sumire Uguisudani (鶯谷 すみれ, Uguisudani Sumire)
Voiced by: Yoshino Aoyama
The most beautiful girl in the class. Though she appears bright and kind, she has a side that is calculating and devious. Despite being pursued by many guys for her appearance, she falls for Yosuke who treats her without ulterior motives. Realizing that Yosuke has feelings for Hana, she is close to Hana on the surface but acts as her rival behind Hana's back. She recovers from Yosuke's rejection with the help of Tetsuo, and gradually spends more time with him.
Tetsuo Gotanda (五反田 鉄男, Gotanda Tetsuo)
Voiced by: Yoshimasa Hosoya
Yosuke's best friend since junior high school. He is part of the judo club. Despite his stern appearance and unchanging expression, he is gentle and considerate. He is the only one who knows Sumire's hidden personality but treats her flatly and gives her serious advice. He distracts Sumire from her heartbreak by taking her to karaoke or games, and they spend more time together after that.
Tsutomu Shimbashi (新橋 努, Shimbashi Tsutomu)
Voiced by: Tasuku Hatanaka
A boy who belongs to the popular group in the class but always looks restless. He has a small stature and an ordinary appearance, and he wore glasses until junior high school. When he entered high school, he dyed his hair and wore contacts. He has a crush on Sumire but struggles due to his low self-esteem. He becomes an early friend, confidant, and supporter of Tabata.
Keisuke Ueno (上野 圭介, Ueno Keisuke)
Voiced by: Makoto Koichi
Yosuke's aloof younger brother who is an elementary school student. While he is mature for his age, he does occasionally display a childish side. Like Yosuke, he is popular with girls at school, albeit he ignores this.
Sayaka Otsuka (大塚 彩華, Ōtsuka Sayaka)
Voiced by: Yūki Takada^{Ep. 9 credits}
Transfer student who went to the same junior high school as Yosuke and Tetsuo. She is a cheerful gyaru who likes makeup. In junior high school, she was teased during choir practice because she is tone deaf and has no sense of rhythm. She became friends with Yosuke and Tetsuo, who sincerely accompanied her during practice.

== Media ==
=== Manga ===
Written and illustrated by Roku Sakura, April Showers Bring May Flowers was serialized in Kadokawa Shoten's seinen manga magazine Young Ace from April 4, 2016, to September 2, 2022. Kadokawa collected its chapters in twelve tankōbon volumes, released from November 4, 2016, to November 4, 2022. A thirteenth volume was released on August 4, 2025.

A "special edition" series, titled April Showers Bring May Flowers: Bloom (ブスに花束を。～Bloom～, Busu ni Hanataba o: Bloom), was serialized in Young Ace from March 4 to September 4, 2025.

In June 2024, Yen Press announced that they licensed the series for English publication beginning in November 2024.

==== Volumes ====
No.	Original release date	Original ISBN	English release date	English ISBN
1	November 4, 2016	978-4-04-104884-9	November 26, 2024	979-8-8554-1208-6
2	July 4, 2017	978-4-04-105648-6	April 15, 2025	979-8-8554-1210-9
3	December 29, 2017	978-4-04-106396-5	July 15, 2025	979-8-8554-1212-3
4	July 4, 2018	978-4-04-107056-7	February 24, 2026	979-8-8554-1214-7
5	December 29, 2018	978-4-04-107734-4	June 23, 2026	979-8-8554-1216-1
6	July 4, 2019	978-4-04-107735-1	April 27, 2027	979-8-8554-1218-5
7	December 28, 2019	978-4-04-108933-0	—	—
8	July 4, 2020	978-4-04-109635-2	—	—
9	December 28, 2020	978-4-04-109636-9	—	—
10	August 3, 2021	978-4-04-111456-8	—	—
11	February 4, 2022	978-4-04-111457-5	—	—
12	November 4, 2022	978-4-04-112859-6	—	—
13	August 4, 2025	978-4-04-116305-4	—	—

=== Anime ===
In November 2022, it was announced that the manga would receive an anime adaptation, which was later revealed to be a television series produced by Silver Link, and directed and written by Mirai Minato, with Miwa Oshima designing the characters, and Yuki Hayashi and Shogo Yamashiro composing the music. The series aired from July 4 to September 26, 2025, on Tokyo MX and other networks. The opening theme song is "Bloom (feat. Ayumu Imazu)", performed by TWS, while the ending theme song is "Souvenir" (スーベニア, Sūbenia), performed by Glasgow.

The series is streaming on Amazon Prime Video in North America.

==== Episodes ====
No.	Title	Directed by (Note: Production staff information is taken from the ending credits of each episode.)	Written by	Storyboarded by	Original release date
1	"Unpopular Girl and Extrovert"; Transliteration: "Moonna to Riajū" (Japanese: 喪女とリア充)	Mirai Minato	Mirai Minato	Mirai Minato	July 4, 2025
2	"How to Act as an Extra"; Transliteration: "Mobu Joshi no Mi no Furi Kata" (Japanese: モブ女子の身の振り方)	Mirai Minato	Nanami Hoshino	Miyana Okita	July 11, 2025
3	"Ugly Girl and Flower on a High Peak"; Transliteration: "Moonna to Takane no Hana" (Japanese: 喪女と高嶺の花)	Mirai Minato	Michiko Yokote	Yūichi Nihei	July 18, 2025
4	"Ugly Girl and Boys Nowadays"; Transliteration: "Moonna to Ima Doki Danshi" (Japanese: 喪女と今ドキ男子)	Yamato Ouchi	Nanami Hoshino	Keiichiro Kawaguchi	July 25, 2025
5	"I Don't Understand Girls"; Transliteration: "Joshi tte Wakannai" (Japanese: 女子ってわかんない)	Mirai Minato	Misaki Morie	Mirai Minato	August 1, 2025
6	"Girls Are a Pain"; Transliteration: "Joshi tte Mendokusai" (Japanese: 女子ってめんどくさい)	Yamato Ouchi	Michiko Yokote	Yamato Ouchi	August 8, 2025
7	"Go Forth, Summer Break"; Transliteration: "Susume! Natsuyasumi" (Japanese: 進め！夏休み)	Masahiro Hosoda	Nanami Hoshino	Noumin6	August 15, 2025
8	"The Only Day in a Year to Become the Main Cast"; Transliteration: "Toshi ni Ichido no Shuyaku-bi" (Japanese: 年に一度の主役日)	Hiroshi Maejima & Nobutaka Chikahashi	Misaki Morie	Keiichiro Kawaguchi	August 22, 2025
9	"I Want to Watch Fireworks with You"; Transliteration: "Kimi to Hanabi ga Mitai" (Japanese: キミと花火が見たい)	Mirai Minato	Nanami Hoshino	Yūichi Nihei	August 29, 2025
10	"The Sweet and Spicy Storm Area"; Transliteration: "Amakute Karai, Bōfūiki" (Japanese: あまくてからい、暴風域)	Keisuke Aida	Misaki Morie	Keisuke Aida	September 5, 2025
11	"We Can't Stay Friends"; Transliteration: "Tomodachi no Mama ja Irarenai" (Japanese: 友達のままじゃいられない)	Shinya Kawatsura & Hiroaki Takagi (live stage)	Nanami Hoshino	Yūichi Nihei & Hiroaki Takagi (live stage)	September 12, 2025
12	"Relationship Without a Name"; Transliteration: "Namae no Tsukanai Kankei" (Japanese: 名前のつかない関係)	Yamato Ouchi	Nanami Hoshino	Mirai Minato	September 19, 2025
13	"A Commonplace Love Story"; Transliteration: "Doko ni Demo Aru Koi no Hanashi" (Japanese: どこにでもある恋の話)	Mirai Minato	Nanami Hoshino	Mirai Minato	September 26, 2025

== Reception ==
The series ranked fifth in the print category of the fifth Next Manga Award in 2019.
