= Yōsuke Takahashi =

Japanese horror manga artist (born 1956)

- Born: 15 March 1956 (age 70); Nagano, Japan
- Occupation: Manga artist
- Known for: Mugen Shinshi and Gakkō Kaidan

Yōsuke Takahashi (高橋 葉介, Takahashi Yōsuke; born 15 March 1956, Nagano, Japan) is a Japanese horror manga artist who is known for his works Mugen Shinshi and Gakkō no Kaidan. He graduated from Komazawa University. He made his professional manga debut in 1977, and has had stories published in the manga anthology series Petit Apple Pie.

Kouta Hirano, the Japanese manga artist, says that Takahashi is a treasure to the Japanese manga world.
