= Eiji Ōtsuka =

Japanese social critic, theorist, and novelist

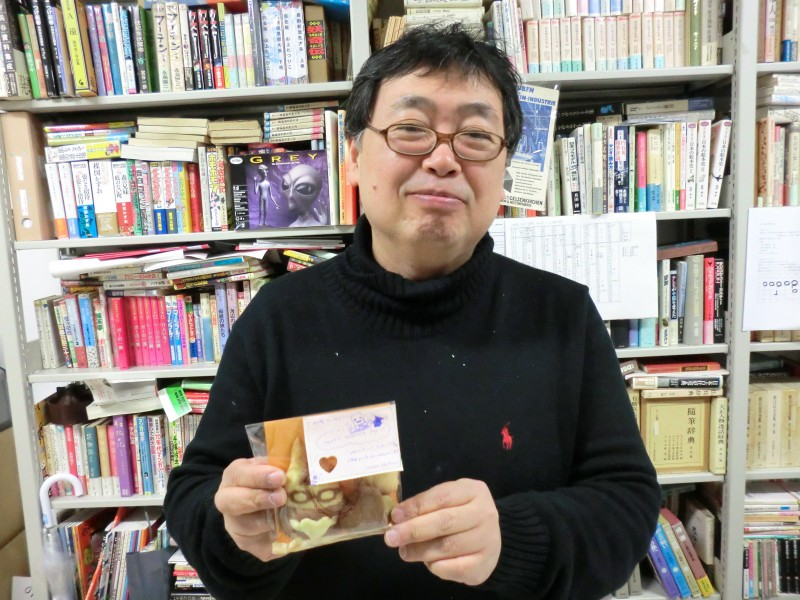
- Ōtsuka in 2012
- Born: 28 August 1958 (age 68); Tokyo, Japan
- Education: University of Tsukuba
- Occupations: Critic, folklorist, novelist, manga artist, editor, media theorist
- Notable work: MPD Psycho; The Kurosagi Corpse Delivery Service
- Spouse: Yumi Shirakura

Eiji Ōtsuka (大塚 英志, Ōtsuka Eiji; born 28 August 1958 in the former Tanashi, Tokyo) is a Japanese social critic, folklorist, media theorist, and novelist. He is currently a professor at International Research Center for Japanese Studies, Kyoto. He graduated from University of Tsukuba with a degree in anthropology, women's folklore, human sacrifice and post-war manga. In addition to his work with manga, Ōtsuka is a critic, essayist, and author of several successful non-fiction books on Japanese popular and otaku subcultures. He has written the Multiple Personality Detective Psycho and The Kurosagi Corpse Delivery Service manga series. One of his first animation script works was Mahō no Rouge Lipstick, an adult lolicon OVA. Ōtsuka was the editor for the bishōjo lolicon manga series Petit Apple Pie.

In the 1980s, Ōtsuka was editor-in-chief of Manga Burikko, a leading manga magazine where he pioneered research on otaku subcultures in modern Japan. He has published a host of books and articles about the manga industry.

In July 2007, he received a doctorate in artistic engineering from Kobe Design University. His doctoral dissertation is "From Mickey's format to Proposition of Atom: the origin of postwar manga methodology in wartime years and its development".

== Biography ==
=== Early life ===
Eiji Ōtsuka was born on 28 August 1958 in the city formerly known as Tanashi, Tokyo (currently Nishitōkyō, Tokyo). His father, as a repatriate from Manchuria, suffered poor living conditions in repatriate housing prior to his acceptance into university. Ōtsuka's father was a member of the former Japanese Communist Party, but he left the party due to disagreements regarding party policy.

In middle school, Ōtsuka joined the dōjin circle Sakuga Group, which lead to his employment as an assistant for manga artist Tarō Minamoto in his first year at high school. The following year, Ōtsuka, with references from Minamoto, debuted as a gag manga artist. However, he soon ended his career as a manga artist during his college entrance exams after deciding that he lacked talent as a manga artist. Ōtsuka graduated the University of Tsukuba in March 1981. There, he studied Japanese folkloristics under the guidance of professor Tokuji Chiba. Ōtsuka gave up the notion of attending graduate school after he was told by instructor Noboru Miyata that his "ideas are too journalistic and not suited for academics".

=== Career ===
After graduation, Ōtsuka worked part-time as the editor of the magazines Ryu and Petit Apple Pie, together with manga artist Yukio Sawada. As a part-time editor, he worked with manga artist Shōtarō Ishinomori for about a month, where he learned how to parse manga names (a "name" refers to the rough draft of a manga page, with preliminary panel layout, dialogue and plot, which is commonly checked by an editor before the artist proceeds to the manuscript phase). Later shifting from part-time to full-time editor, Ōtsuka worked as the editor-in-chief of the manga magazine Manga Burikko on a freelance basis. The comments he published in the magazine under a pseudonym became the basis of Ōtsuka's later career as a commentator. It was also during this time that the first official use of the term "otaku" was published in Manga Burikko in 1983, with Ōtsuka still serving as its editor-in-chief.

Late in the 1980s, Ōtsuka was involved in the trial of a serial kidnapper and murderer of young girls, active between 1988 and 1989 in Saitama, Tokyo. The suspect (and later convicted perpetrator), Tsutomu Miyazaki, was found to have possessed a large collection of manga, which at the time meant that the manga subculture was "repeatedly" linked to Miyazaki in the press and in popular imagination, creating the image that "young people involved with amateur manga are dangerous, psychologically disturbed perverts." Ōtsuka contested this popular perception, later writing that he "became somewhat angry about how judgment of [Miyazaki's] crimes kept shifting onto otaku hobbies or tastes."

In his 1989 book A Theory of Narrative Consumption (Monogatari shōhiron), Ōtsuka developed a theory of media consumption based around the consumption of multiple small narratives that fit inside a "worldview" or grand narrative. This was a large influence on Hiroki Azuma's theories of otaku, and Azuma's writing consequently helped give narrative consumption "canonical status within manga and anime criticism".

Ōtsuka has gone on to lecture at various Japanese universities and colleges on the topic of manga studies. In 2007, he received his PhD from Kobe Design University, with the doctoral dissertation titled "From Mickey's format to Proposition of Atom: the origin of postwar manga methodology in wartime years and its development".

== Works ==
Critical essays

- まんがの構造――商品・テキスト・現象 Construction of Manga――Product・Text・Phenomenon, Yudachisha, 1987
- 物語消費論 A Theory of Narrative Consumption, Shinyousha, 1989
- システムと儀式 System and Ritual, Chikumashobō, 1992
- 戦後まんがの表現空間 Expression space of post-war manga, Houzoukan, 1994
- キャラクター小説の作り方 How to make The Character Novels, Kōdansha, 2003
- アトムの命題 Proposition of Atom, Tokumashoten, 2003
- おたくの精神史 ―― 1980年代論 The Intellectual History of Otaku ―― 1980's Theory, Kōdansha, 2004

Novel

- 木島日記 [Kijima Diary]

Manga

- 魍魎 戦記 MADARA Madara (1987–1994)
- JAPAN Japan (1994–1995)
- 多重人格探偵サイコ Multiple Personality Detective Psycho (1997–2016)
- 木島日記 Kijima Diary (1999–2003)
- リヴァイアサン Leviathan (1999–2005)
- 黒鷺死体宅急便 The Kurosagi Corpse Delivery Service (2000–present)
- 探偵儀式 Detective Ritual (2004–2009)

Anime

- Mahō no Rouge Lipstick (魔法のルージュ りっぷ☆すてぃっく, Mahō no Rūju Rippusutikku) (1985 OVA), Original creator

=== Critical works in English translation ===
- Ōtsuka, Eiji (2010). "World and Variation: The Reproduction and Consumption of Narrative". Mechademia. 5. Translated by Marc Steinberg. University of Minnesota Press: 99–116 – via Project MUSE.
