= Japan (1994 manga) =

Japanese manga series

- Cover of the first volume

ジャパン
- Genre: Science fiction
- Manga
- Written by: Eiji Ohtsuka
- Illustrated by: Mami Itoh
- Published by: Kadokawa Shoten
- Original run: January 1994 – August 1995
- Volumes: 3

Japan (ジャパン) is a manga series by Eiji Ōtsuka with art by Mami Itoh.

== Volume list ==
No.	Original release date	Original ISBN	Second edition release date	Second edition ISBN
1	January 1994	9784047120310	May 2000	9784047133099
2	December 1994	9784047120358	July 2000	9784047133174
3	August 1995	9784047120365	August 2000	9784047133419

== Reception ==
Manga Sanctuary called it a brilliant and complex story, and called it very gripping.
