= Housui Yamazaki =

Japanese manga artist

- Area: Manga artist
- Notable works: Mail; The Story of Our Corpse Hunt; The Kurosagi Corpse Delivery Service

Housui Yamazaki (山崎 峰水, Yamazaki Hōsui) is a Japanese manga artist. He wrote and illustrated the three volume Mail series. He currently illustrates The Kurosagi Corpse Delivery Service, which is authored by Eiji Ōtsuka.

== Works ==
Manga

- ブレア・ウィッチ・プロジェクト ザ・コミック The Blair Witch Project: The Comic (2000)
- ブレアウィッチ2 バーキッツヴィル7 Blair Witch 2 The Burkittsville 7 (2001)
- Developers 機動戦士ガンダム Before One Year War Developers - Mobile Suit Gundam: Before the One Year War (2003)
- メイル Mail (2004–2005)
- 黒鷺死体宅配便 The Kurosagi Corpse Delivery Service (2004–present)
- くもはち Kumohachi (2005)
- みくもとかさね Mikumo to Kasane (2010)
- 松岡國男妖怪退治 Matsuoka Kunio: Youkai Exterminator (2011–2014)
- アライアズキ、今宵も小豆を洗う。 Arai Azuki washes the adzuki beans again tonight (2016–2017)
- 雨の首ふり坂 Ame no kubi furi-zaka (2020)
- くだんのピストル Kudan no Pistol (2022–2023)
- ぼくたちの死体さがし The Story of Our Corpse Hunt (2022–2024)
- 終末ゾンビキャンプ Apocalyptic Zombie Camp (2026–present)
