= Lolita Anime =

1984 original video animation

ロリータアニメ (Rorita Anime)
- Genre: Hentai, lolicon, yuri
- Original video animation
- Directed by: Toshiro Kuni; Tsuneyuki Miyamoto
- Produced by: Hidetaka Takagi
- Written by: Fumio Nakajima
- Music by: Tetsuo Kawamura
- Studio: Wonder Kids
- Released: 21 February 1984 – 25 May 1985
- Runtime: 30 minutes (1 hour for 6th OVA)
- Episodes: 6

Lolita Anime (ロリータアニメ, Rorita Anime) is a collection of adult original video animations (OVA) produced by Wonder Kids. It contains many notable firsts, as the first erotic original video animation, depicting hentai scenes which include yuri, BDSM and lolicon characters. It ran from February 1984 to May 1985 and consisted of six episodes. An alternative name for this anime is Wonder Magazine Series and was based on a manga by Fumio Nakajima, which was serialized in the lolicon magazine Lemon People.

== Production ==
Lolita Anime was planned and produced during the height of the "lolicon boom" in amateur Japanese animation, which was pioneered by figures such as Aki Uchiyama (whose name would be used to promote Lolita Anime by Nikkatsu, released later the same year) and Hideo Azuma. The script and designs of the first two episodes were based on Fumio Nakajima's manga. Sales for these first two episodes were not ideal, which led Wonder Kids to create Miu, a heroine who was more cartoony in appearance and subject to less sadistic treatment than the girls in prior episodes. A third installment by Nakajima was produced, but delayed in favour of Miu's debut episode. The installment was later added to the sixth and final episode.

Not long after Lolita Anime's initial episodes were released, more erotic OVAs went into production from other independent animators; as a result, Wonder Kids decided to end Lolita Anime series.

== Staff ==
Much of Wonder Kids' staff was either uncredited or used pseudonyms. Known names include:

- Fumio Nakajima (中島史雄, Nakajima Fumio) - director and producer (episodes 1-2), executive producer
- Tatsuji Kurahashi (倉橋達治, Kurahashi Tatsuji) - animation director and animator (episodes 1-2), credited as "R. Ching"
- Toshiro Kuni (クニ・トシロウ, Kuni Toshirou) - director and storyboard artist (episodes 1-2)
- Tsuneyuki Miyamoto (宮本恒之, Miyamoto Tsuneyuki) - director and producer (episode 3), credited as "Mickey Masuda"
- Kazuo Sudo (須藤一男, Sudou Kazuo) - scriptwriter credited as "Okajouki" (episodes 1-3), musical arrangement
- Tetsuo Kawamura (河村哲生, Kawamura Tetsuo) - music producer and lyricist (episodes 3-6)
- E&M Planning Center - sound effects
- Kenichi Matsumoto (松本謙一, Matsumoto Kenichi) - corporate planner

=== Cast ===
- Masaru Ikeda - Crime boss (episode 1B)
- Yōko Asagami - Miu, Itsuko Hirai (episode 2A), Oneechan (episode 3), Tomoyo (episode 4), Michael (episode 5)
- Shigeru Nakahara - Salaryman (episode 3), Will (episode 5)
- Rokurō Naya - Salaryman (episode 6)

== Episodes ==
No.	Title	Original release date
1	"Lolita Anime I: The Reddening Snow ~Girls Tortured with Roses~"; Transliteration: "Rorita Anime I: Yuki no Beni Kesho ~Shōjo Bara Kei~" (Japanese: ロリータアニメI：雪の紅化粧 ～少女薔薇刑～)	21 February 1984
A single volume containing two 15-minute segments. The first episode focuses on Youko, an orphan in a small village forced to care for her senile grandfather. Her grandfather keeps forcing himself on Youko because he mistakes her for his late wife. Later, a group of boys in the village rape Youko, which triggers an avalanche. The second episode follows Kyoko, a schoolgirl whose father owes money to a mob. The mob boss kidnaps Kyoko with the intention of making her work off the debt as a bondage slave.
2	"Lolita Anime II: Itsuko Can Die Happy ~Altar of Sacrifice"; Transliteration: "Rorita Anime II: Itsuko no Shinde mo ii ~Ikenie no Saidan" (Japanese: ロリータアニメII：何日子の死んでもいい ～いけにえの祭壇)	1 May 1984
Released as a single volume which contains two 15-minute segments. In the third segment, Itsuko is an awkward schoolgirl with a crush on her senpai. This boy saves Itsuko from being raped by a drunk salaryman, and she takes refuge at her senpai's house for the night. The fourth episode follows the hedonist adventures of a private school's art teacher and his young student.
3	"Lolita Anime III: House of Kittens"; Transliteration: "Rorita Anime III: Koneko-chan no Iru Mise" (Japanese: ロリータアニメIII：仔猫ちゃんのいる店)	21 July 1984
A middle-aged man is teleported via portal from a bar to a nightclub full of girls. There, he meets Miu, a young green-haired girl, who he begins to pursue, but Miu is not about to be taken advantage of, and she leads the man through a series of sci-fi settings.
4	"Lolita Anime IV: Variation"; Transliteration: "Rorita Anime IV: Hensōkyoku" (Japanese: ロリータアニメIV：変奏曲)	20 December 1984
A girl named Tomoyo is invited to model at her art teacher's house. Her teacher, Mr. Nishiwaki, has ulterior motives, and drugs Tomoyo with diuretic pills in order to force her to urinate for him. Tomoyo is then forced into a submissive relationship with both her art teacher and music teacher, whom are engaged to each other. This episode was based on Fumio Nakajima's manga miniseries Ark of the School Uniform (制服の箱舟, Seifuku no Hakobune).
5	"Lolita Anime V: Surf Dreaming"; Transliteration: "Rorita Anime V: Sāfu dorīmingu" (Japanese: ロリータアニメV：サーフドリーミング)	21 February 1985
Miu returns, this time as the girlfriend of an American surfing expert named David, but secretly, both are shape-shifting aliens. Miu goes surfing, and befriends a boy named William, who is interested in both Miu and David.
6	"Lolita Anime Collection: Seaside Angel Miu"; Transliteration: "Rorita Anime Soushuuhen: Shīsaido enjeru Miu" (Japanese: ロリータアニメ集：シーサイドエンジェル ＭＩＵ)	25 May 1985
This episode was a clip show compilation meant to cap off the Lolita Anime series. Miu returns on an enormous spacecraft, with the man from episode 3 piloting it. They send out a special page that can only be heard by people with "dirty minds", and the girls from previous Lolita Anime episodes call in to talk to Miu. This episode is 60 minutes long, but is padded with both reused footage and instrumental slideshows of Miu at the beach.

== Reception and legacy ==
Lolita Anime received mostly negative reception outside of otaku circles, with The Anime Encyclopedia entry on the work describing it as "disturbing" for its contents, which include gang rape and bondage of fictional underage girls. It is also known as the first erotic anime video release. It also featured the reoccurring character Miu, whose popularity prefigured that of Cream Lemon's Ami.
