= Please Go Home, Miss Akutsu! =

Japanese manga series

- First tankōbon volume cover, featuring Riko Akutsu

帰ってください！ 阿久津さん (Kaette Kudasai! Akutsu-san)
- Genre: Romantic comedy; Slice of life
- Manga
- Written by: Taichi Nagaoka
- Published by: Kadokawa Shoten
- English publisher: NA: Seven Seas Entertainment
- Magazine: Young Ace Up
- Original run: July 29, 2019 – present
- Volumes: 11
- icon

Please Go Home, Miss Akutsu! (Japanese: 帰ってください！ 阿久津さん, Hepburn: Kaette Kudasai! Akutsu-san) is a Japanese manga series written and illustrated by Taichi Nagaoka. It has been serialized by Kadokawa Shoten on their Young Ace Up manga website since July 2019.

== Premise ==
Kouta Oyama is a high school student who lives alone. One day, Riko Akutsu, a delinquent classmate, suddenly arrives at his apartment complex and decides to use his room as her personal hangout. Despite wanting Akutsu to go home, Oyama is conflicted about the situation.

== Characters ==
Kouta Oyama (大山 こうた, Ōyama Kōta)
Voiced by: Daishi Kajita (vomic)
Oyama is a second-year high school student who lives alone, but has to deal with Akutsu since she is constantly hanging out in his room after school and sometimes even stays the night.^{Ch. 1, 29} While he does want Akutsu to go home, he becomes flustered when he is around her.^{Ch. 1} He is also concerned that she might stay at some other guy's place if she leaves.^{Ch. 36}
Riko Akutsu (阿久津 リコ, Akutsu Riko)
Voiced by: Asami Tano (vomic)
Akutsu is Oyama's delinquent classmate who constantly hangs out in his room to read manga, play video games, and eat snacks.^{Ch. 1} While she likes to tease Oyama, she slowly develops romantic feelings towards him, especially after he makes statements like pleading her to stay and not wanting her to go off with any other guys.^{Ch. 36, 47–52}
Misaki Tanaka (田中 ミサキ, Tanaka Misaki)
Misaki is one of Akutsu's friends since middle school.^{Ch. 18, Vol. 3 extra} Knowing that Akutsu has feelings for Oyama, she likes to tease her about the situation.^{Ch. 66, 95} She is the shortest of the three girls and has short black hair with bunches.^{Ch. 18}
Youko Suzuki (鈴木 ヨウコ, Suzuki Yōko)
Youko is one of Akutsu's friends since middle school.^{Ch. 18, Vol. 3 extra} Knowing that Akutsu has feelings for Oyama, she likes to flirt with Oyama in order to get a reaction out of Akutsu.^{Ch. 66, 95} She has short brown hair in a ponytail and a large chest.^{Ch. 18}
Aoi Ohya (大矢 葵, Ōya Aoi)
Ohya is the landlady's 20-year-old daughter. As a fan of romantic comedy manga, she becomes very interested in Oyama and Akutsu's relationship when she realizes Akutsu is secretly in love with Oyama but shyly denies it.^{Ch. 52}
Oyama's mother (大山母, Ōyama haha)
Oyama's mother is a kind woman who shows up at her son's apartment.^{Ch. 81–83} She was initially skeptical of Akutsu until she is convinced that Akutsu and her son are dating.^{Ch. 82}
Hibiki (ヒビキ)
Hibiki is a year younger than Oyama and Akutsu. She is a delinquent who initially tried to challenge Akutsu, but lost. Since then, she has looked up to Akutsu as a big sister and demands that Oyama give Akutsu back to her. She and Akutsu used to hang out together in the same room.^{Ch. 89–94}
Reiko Akutsu (阿久津 レイコ, Akutsu Reiko)
Reiko shows up at Oyama's apartment after she discovers her daughter's whereabouts. It is later revealed she was a delinquent herself, as she also hung out often in her future husband's room, and she behaves very much like her daughter.^{Ch. 100–101}
Kenji Akutsu (阿久津 けんじ, Akutsu Kenji)
Kenji shows up at Oyama's apartment after Reiko has made a few visits.^{Ch. 113} Like Oyama, he had to deal with his future wife when she hung out in his room.^{Ch. 101, 114}

== Publication ==
Written and illustrated by Taichi Nagaoka, Please Go Home, Miss Akutsu! began serialization on Kadokawa Shoten's Young Ace Up manga website on July 29, 2019. Kadokawa has collected its chapters into individual tankōbon volumes. The first volume was released on June 4, 2020. As of December 27, 2025, eleven volumes have been released.

On September 21, 2022, Seven Seas Entertainment announced they licensed the series. They released the first volume under their Ghost Ship imprint on April 4, 2023.

On November 18, 2024, Nagaoka announced the series was going on indefinite hiatus due to health issues. It resumed on June 9, 2025. On June 22, 2026, Nagaoka announced that due to family circumstances, the series was going on another hiatus for about three months starting in August of the same year.

=== Volumes ===
No.	Original release date	Original ISBN	English release date	English ISBN
1	June 4, 2020	978-4-04-109357-3	April 4, 2023	978-1-68579-698-3
Chapters 1–27 and a bonus story.
Kouta Oyama is annoyed that Riko Akutsu, a delinquent classmate, has been using his room as her personal hangout. Akutsu finds Oyama's adult videos and makes him watch. Akutsu dares Oyama to pull her off his bed. Oyama is hesitant about waking Akutsu up. Akutsu wants to invite her delinquent friends. Oyama worries Akutsu will blackmail him. Oyama peeks at Akutsu's phone. Oyama tends to Akutsu's injured hand. Oyama gives Akutsu a massage. Oyama pretends to be asleep. Akutsu wrestles Oyama because he was glaring at her. Akutsu gets scared of a cockroach. Akutsu wants Oyama to do her supplemental homework. Akutsu gets angry when Oyama arrives home late. Akutsu catches Oyama lying that he has a girlfriend. Akutsu is jealous when her friends ask Oyama to do errands. Akutsu visits when Oyama is sick. Akutsu questions why Oyama talks to her so formally. Akutsu makes Oyama exercise. Akutsu and Oyama watch a horror movie. Akutsu visits on a holiday. Akutsu makes Oyama some food. Oyama's classmates visit. Akutsu gets upset when Oyama says he is going back to his parents' house.
2	October 2, 2020	978-4-04-109360-3	July 4, 2023	978-1-68579-706-5
Chapters 28–49 and four bonus stories.
Oyama and Akutsu become more romantically conscious of each other. Oyama wakes up and finds Akutsu sleeping next to him. Akutsu uses an ear pick on Oyama. Akutsu brings clothes to stay over. Oyama wants to air out the bed sheets. Oyama checks Akutsu's head for a bump. Akutsu's legs go numb as she is tackling Oyama with them. Akutsu wants to stay over again. Oyama finds a lighter that he thinks belongs to her. Akutsu asks Oyama if she should change her hair color. Oyama accidentally drinks from Akutsu's can. Akutsu shares that someone attempted to grope her. Akutsu wants Oyama to go on a diet with her. Akutsu meets the landlady's cat who shares her given name. Oyama gets enamored by how Akutsu smells. Akutsu challenges Oyama on feats of strength. Akutsu's friends ask her whether she has a boyfriend. Akutsu finds Oyama's reaction to his nipples being touched funny. Akutsu has a cold but stays over. Akutsu worries when Oyama is out getting juice. Akutsu becomes more conscious of Oyama.
3	June 4, 2021	978-4-04-111363-9	October 10, 2023	978-1-68579-933-5
Chapters 50–69 and two bonus stories.
Akutsu is hesitant about entering Oyama's room. Akutsu is bothered by Oyama's intention to make more eye contact. Aoi Ohya, Oyama's landlady's daughter, talks about noise complaints of a sexual nature coming from his room. Akutsu wants to sit closer to Oyama. Akutsu accidentally sees Oyama naked and faints; Ohya suggests Oyama wake her up by giving her mouth-to-mouth. Akutsu pretends to go home so she can hear what Oyama thinks of her. Akutsu needs a notebook, so Oyama gives her one of his. Ohya has the two cat-sit for Riko the cat. Oyama is excited when he sees Akutsu sporting a ponytail. Akutsu asks Oyama to clean her ears. Ohya notices Akutsu's jealousy when she gives Oyama food. Oyama waking up Akutsu during class becomes an embarrassment. Oyama wants Akutsu to scratch an itch on his back. Akutsu's friends discover that she has been visiting Oyama and want to make him their errand boy. Akutsu reads a romantic comedy manga borrowed from Ohya. Akutsu visits Oyama on his birthday. Oyama worries Akutsu will not visit as often now that they are on summer break.
4	December 3, 2021	978-4-04-112112-2	January 2, 2024	978-1-68579-957-1
Chapters 70–88 and three bonus stories.
5	June 3, 2022	978-4-04-112550-2	April 2, 2024	979-8-88843-416-1
Chapters 89–105 and two bonus stories.
6	December 2, 2022	978-4-04-113161-9	July 9, 2024	979-8-88843-595-3
Chapters 106–124 and two bonus stories.
7	June 2, 2023	978-4-04-113702-4	November 12, 2024	979-8-89160-067-6
Chapters 124.5–141 and two bonus stories.
8	December 4, 2023	978-4-04-114343-8	March 11, 2025	979-8-89160-902-0
Chapters 142–158 and three bonus stories.
9	June 4, 2024	978-4-04-115059-7	August 19, 2025	979-8-89373-719-6
Chapters 159–175 and three bonus stories.
10	December 27, 2024	978-4-04-115340-6	January 6, 2026	979-8-89373-955-8
Chapters 176–189 and three bonus stories.
11	December 27, 2025	978-4-04-116904-9	October 13, 2026	979-8-89765-383-6
Chapters 190–200 and a bonus story.

== Notes ==
- "Ch." is shortened form for chapter and refers to a chapter number of the manga.
