= Lolicon =

Genre of sexualized young or young-looking female characters

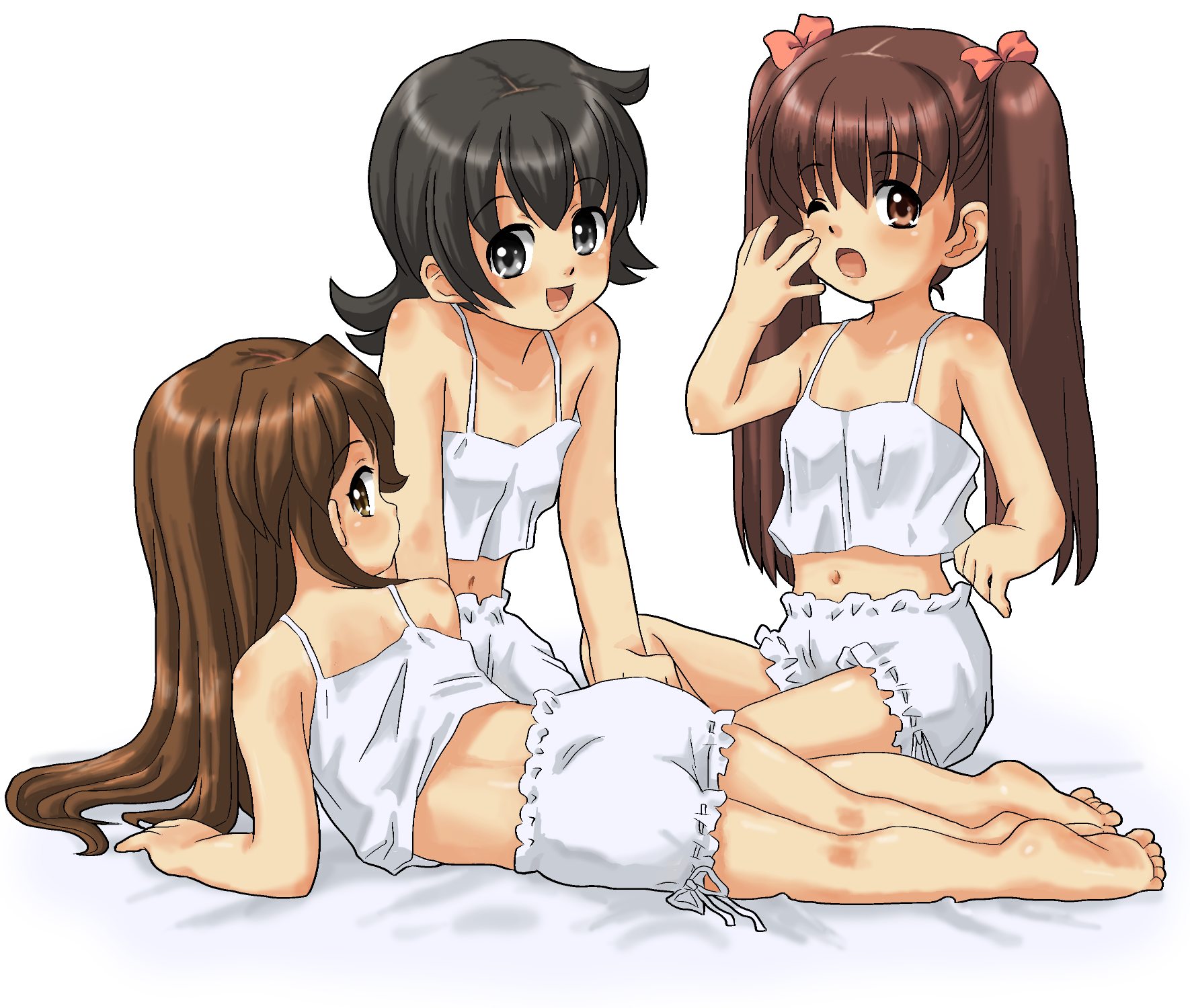
A manga-style depiction of young girls wearing lingerie. Lolicon artwork often blends childlike characteristics with erotic undertones.

In Japanese popular culture, lolicon (ロリコン, rorikon) is a genre of fictional media which focuses on young or young-looking girl characters, particularly in a sexually suggestive, fetishistic or erotic context. The term, a portmanteau of the English-language phrase "Lolita complex", also refers to desire and affection for such characters (ロリ, "loli"), and their fans. Associated mainly with stylized imagery in manga, anime, and video games, lolicon in otaku culture is generally understood as distinct from desires for realistic depictions of young girls, or real young girls as such, and is associated with moe, or affection for fictional characters, often bishōjo (appealing girl) characters in manga or anime.

The phrase "Lolita complex", derived from Russell Trainer's thesis that itself borrowed its namesake from the novel Lolita, entered use in Japan in the 1970s. During the "lolicon boom" in erotic manga of the early 1980s, the term was adopted in the nascent otaku culture to denote attraction to early bishōjo characters, and later only to younger-looking depictions as bishōjo designs became more varied. The artwork of the lolicon boom, which was strongly influenced by the styles of shōjo manga, marked a shift from realism, and the advent of "cute eroticism" (kawaii ero), an aesthetic which is now common in manga and anime broadly. The lolicon boom faded by the mid-1980s, and the genre has since made up a minority of erotic manga.

Since the 1990s, lolicon has been a keyword in manga debates in Japan and globally. Child pornography laws in some countries apply to depictions of fictional child characters, while those in other countries, including Japan, do not. Opponents and supporters have debated if the genre contributes to child sexual abuse. Culture and media scholars generally identify lolicon with a broader separation between fiction and reality within otaku sexuality.

== Definition ==
Lolicon is a Japanese abbreviation of "Lolita complex" (ロリータ・コンプレックス, rorīta konpurekkusu), an English-language phrase derived from Vladimir Nabokov's novel Lolita (1955) and introduced to Japan in Russell Trainer's The Lolita Complex (1966, translated 1969), a work of pop psychology in which it is used to denote attraction to pubescent and pre-pubescent girls. In Japanese, the phrase was adopted to describe feelings of love and lust for young girls over adult women, which remains the term's common meaning. Due to its association with otaku culture, the term is more often used to describe desires for young or young-looking girl characters (ロリ, "loli") in manga or anime, which are generally understood to exist within fiction. However, the meaning of the term remains contested, and it carries a connotation of pedophilia for much of the public. (Note: Translator Matt Alt states that the term is treated as "something of a four-letter word [...] virtually synonymous with pedophilia", and Patrick W. Galbraith similarly writes that "'lolicon' is often almost synonymous with 'pedophilia' for critics today".) Lolicon also refers to works, particularly sexually suggestive or erotic, which feature such characters, and their fans. Lolicon is distinct from words for pedophilia (yōji-zuki and pedofiria; clinically, shōniseiai and jidōseiai) (Note: yōji-zuki (幼児好き); pedofiria (ペドフィリア); shōniseiai (小児性愛); jidōseiai (児童性愛)) and for child pornography (jidō poruno). (Note: 児童ポルノ)

The meaning of lolicon within the otaku context developed in the early 1980s, during the "lolicon boom" (Note: ロリコンブーム, rorikon būmu) in erotic manga (see § History). According to Akira Akagi, the meaning of lolicon moved away from the sexual pairing of an older man and a young girl, and instead came to describe desire for "cuteness" and "girl-ness" in manga and anime. Others defined lolicon as a desire for "cute things", "manga-like" or "anime-like" characters, "roundness", and the "two-dimensional" as opposed to the "real". At the time, all eroticism in the manga style featuring bishōjo (cute girl) characters was associated with the term, and synonyms of "Lolita complex" included "two-dimensional complex" (nijigen konpurekkusu), "two-dimensional fetishism" (nijikon fechi), "two-dimensional syndrome" (nijikon shōkōgun), "cute girl syndrome" (bishōjo shōkōgun), and simply "sickness" (byōki). (Note: nijigen konpurekkusu (二次元コンプレックス); nijikon fechi (二次元コンフェチ); nijikon shōkōgun (二次元コン症候群); bishōjo shōkōgun (美少女症候群); byōki (病気)) As character body types within erotic manga became more varied by the end of the lolicon boom in 1984, the scope of the term narrowed to younger-looking depictions.

Lolicon became a buzz word after the 1989 arrest of Tsutomu Miyazaki, a serial killer of young girls who was portrayed by the Japanese media as an otaku (see § History). As lolicon was conflated with pedophilia in the public debates on "harmful manga", (Note: yūgai komikku (有害コミック) or yūgai manga (有害漫画)) its meaning was replaced among otaku by moe, which refers to feelings of affection for characters more generally. Like moe, lolicon is still used by many otaku to refer to attraction which is consciously distinct from reality; some otaku identify as "two-dimensional lolicon" (nijigen rorikon) (Note: 二次元ロリコン) to specify their attraction to characters. The term has become a keyword in criticism of manga and sexuality within Japan, as well as globally with the spread of Japanese popular culture.

== History ==
=== Background ===
In the 1970s, shōjo manga (marketed to girls and young adult women) underwent a renaissance in which artists, such as those of the Year 24 Group, experimented with new narratives and styles, and introduced themes such as psychology, gender, and sexuality. These developments attracted adult male fans of shōjo manga, who crossed gendered boundaries to produce and consume it. The first appearance of the term "Lolita complex" in manga was in Stumbling Upon a Cabbage Patch, (Note: Kyabetsu-batake de Tsumazuite (キャベツ畑でつまずいて)) an Alice in Wonderland–inspired work by Shinji Wada published in a 1974 issue of the shōjo manga magazine Bessatsu Margaret, where a male character calls Lewis Carroll a man with a "strange character of liking only small children" in an inside joke to adult readers. (Note: See Lewis Carroll § Speculation of sexual conduct by scholars (1940s onwards).) Early lolicon artwork was influenced by male artists mimicking shōjo manga, as well as erotic manga created by female artists for male readers.

The image of the shōjo (young girl) rose to prominence in Japanese mass media in the 1970s as a symbol of cuteness, innocence, and an "idealized Eros", attributes which became attached to imagery of younger girls over time. Nude photographs of shōjo, conceived as fine art, gained popularity: a photo collection titled Nymphet: The Myth of the 12-Year-Old was published in 1969, and in 1972 and 1973 there was an "Alice boom" in nude photos themed around Alice in Wonderland. Specialty adult magazines carrying nude photos, fiction, and essays on the appeal of young girls emerged in the 1980s; this trend faded in the late 1980s, due to backlash and because many men preferred images of shōjo in manga and anime. The spread of such imagery, both in photographs and in manga, may have been helped by prohibitions on displaying pubic hair under Japan's obscenity laws. (Note: When obscenity enforcement against depictions of pubic hair was partially eased in 1991, facilitating a trend of "hair nude" photo books, depictions in manga and anime continued to be regulated.)

=== 1970s–1980s ===
Front page of Hideo Azuma's first contribution to Cybele, an erotic parody of "Little Red Riding Hood". Critic Gō Itō identifies the work as a comment on a "certain eroticism" in the roundness of Osamu Tezuka's characters.

The rise of lolicon as a genre began at Comiket (Comic Market), a convention for the sale of dōjinshi (self-published works) founded in 1975 by adult male fans of shōjo manga. In 1979, a group of male artists published the first issue of the fanzine Cybele; its standout creator was Hideo Azuma, who is known as the "Father of Lolicon". Prior to Cybele, the dominant style in seinen (marketed to men) and pornographic manga (hentai) was gekiga, characterized by realism, sharp angles, dark hatching, and gritty linework. Azuma's manga, in contrast, displayed light shading and clean, circular lines, which he viewed as "thoroughly erotic" and sharing with shōjo manga a "lack of reality". Azuma's combination of the stout bodies of Osamu Tezuka's works and the emotive faces of shōjo manga marked the advent of the bishōjo and the aesthetic of "cute eroticism" (kawaii ero). (Note: かわいいエロ) While erotic, lolicon manga was initially mainly viewed as humorous and parodic, but a large fan base soon grew in response to the alternative to pornographic gekiga that it represented. Erotic manga began to move away from combining realistic bodies and cartoony faces towards a wholly-unrealistic style. Lolicon manga played a role in attracting male fans to Comiket, whose participants were 90 percent female in 1975; by 1981, the proportion of male and female participants was equal. Lolicon manga, mostly created by and for men, served as a response to yaoi manga (featuring male homoeroticism), mostly created by and for women.

The early 1980s saw a "lolicon boom" in professional and amateur art. The popularity of lolicon within the otaku community attracted the attention of publishers, who founded specialty publications dedicated to the genre such as Lemon People and Manga Burikko, both in 1982. Other magazines of the boom included Manga Hot Milk, Melon Comic, (Note: メロンCOMIC) and Halfliter. The genre's rise was closely linked to the concurrent development of otaku culture and growing fan consciousness; the word otaku itself was coined in Burikko in 1983. Originally founded as an unprofitable gekiga magazine, the publication was transformed into a lolicon magazine in 1983 by editor Eiji Ōtsuka, whose intention was to publish "shōjo manga for boys". (Note: Ōtsuka also edited Petit Apple Pie, an anthology series featuring works from the artists of Manga Burikko without eroticism; it is also remembered as a lolicon publication.) Reflecting the influence of shōjo manga, there was an increasingly small place in lolicon artwork for realistic characters and explicit depictions of sex; in 1983, Burikko's editors yielded to reader demands by removing photographs of gravure idol models from its opening pages, publishing an issue with the subtitle "Totally Bishōjo Comic Magazine". Lolicon magazines regularly published female artists, such as Kyoko Okazaki and Erika Sakurazawa, and male artists such as Aki Uchiyama, dubbed the "King of Lolicon", who produced 160 pages of manga per month to meet demand. Uchiyama's works were published both in niche magazines such as Lemon People and in the mainstream Shōnen Champion. The first-ever pornographic anime series was Lolita Anime, an OVA released episodically in 1984 and 1985.

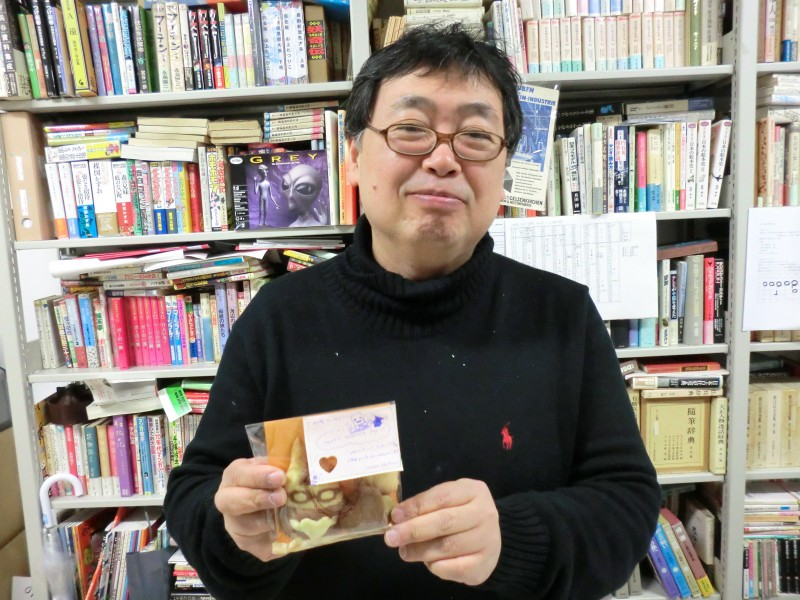
Eiji Ōtsuka, editor of the lolicon magazine Manga Burikko, played a key role in the lolicon boom.

Iconic characters of the lolicon boom include Clarisse from the film Lupin III: Castle of Cagliostro (1979) and Lana from the TV series Future Boy Conan (1978), both directed by Hayao Miyazaki. Clarisse was especially popular, and inspired a series of articles discussing her appeal in the anime specialty magazines Gekkan Out, Animec, and Animage, as well as a trend of fan works dubbed "Clarisse magazines" which were not explicitly sexual, but instead "fairytale-esque" and "girly" in nature. Many early lolicon works combined mecha and bishōjo elements; the premiere of the Daicon III Opening Animation at the 1981 Japan SF Convention is one notable example of the prominence of science fiction and lolicon in the nascent otaku culture of the time. Anime shows targeted at young girls with young girl heroines, such as Magical Princess Minky Momo (1982–1983), gained new viewership from adult male fans, who started fan clubs and were courted by creators.

The lolicon boom in commercial erotic manga only lasted until 1984. Near the end of the boom, because "readers had no attachment to lolicon per se" and "did not take [young girls] as objects of sexual desire", a majority of readers and creators of erotic manga moved towards the diversifying bishōjo works featuring "baby-faced and big-breasted" characters, which were no longer considered lolicon. At Comiket, lolicon manga declined in popularity by 1989 following developments in erotic dōjinshi, including new genres of fetishism and the growing popularity of softcore erotica popular with men and women, particularly in yuri manga (featuring lesbian themes).

=== 1990s–present ===
In 1989, lolicon and otaku became the subject of a media frenzy and moral panic after the arrest of Tsutomu Miyazaki, a young man who had kidnapped and murdered four girls between the ages of four and seven and committed sexual acts with their corpses. Widely disseminated photos of Miyazaki's room revealed an extensive collection of video tapes, which included horror and slasher films on which he had modelled some of his crimes, and manga, including shōjo and lolicon works. (Note: Some journalists in the room later stated that Miyazaki had owned only a few adult manga, which were moved to the foreground of photographs and created a false impression.) In the extended public debates that followed, Miyazaki's crimes were blamed on supposed media effects: namely, a reduction in his inhibitions to crime, and a blurring of the lines between fiction and reality. Miyazaki was labelled as an otaku, and an image of otaku as "socially and sexually immature" men, and for some as "pedophiles and potential predators", was established for much of the public. In February 1991, there were doujinshi creators who sold their work through supportive comic book stores. This practice came to light when three managers of such shops were arrested for having a lolicon doujinshi for sale. The decade saw local crackdowns on retailers and publishers of "harmful manga", and the arrests of some manga artists. Despite this, lolicon imagery expanded and became more acceptable within manga in the 1990s, and the early 2000s saw a small boom in the genre sparked by the magazine Comic LO.

== Media ==
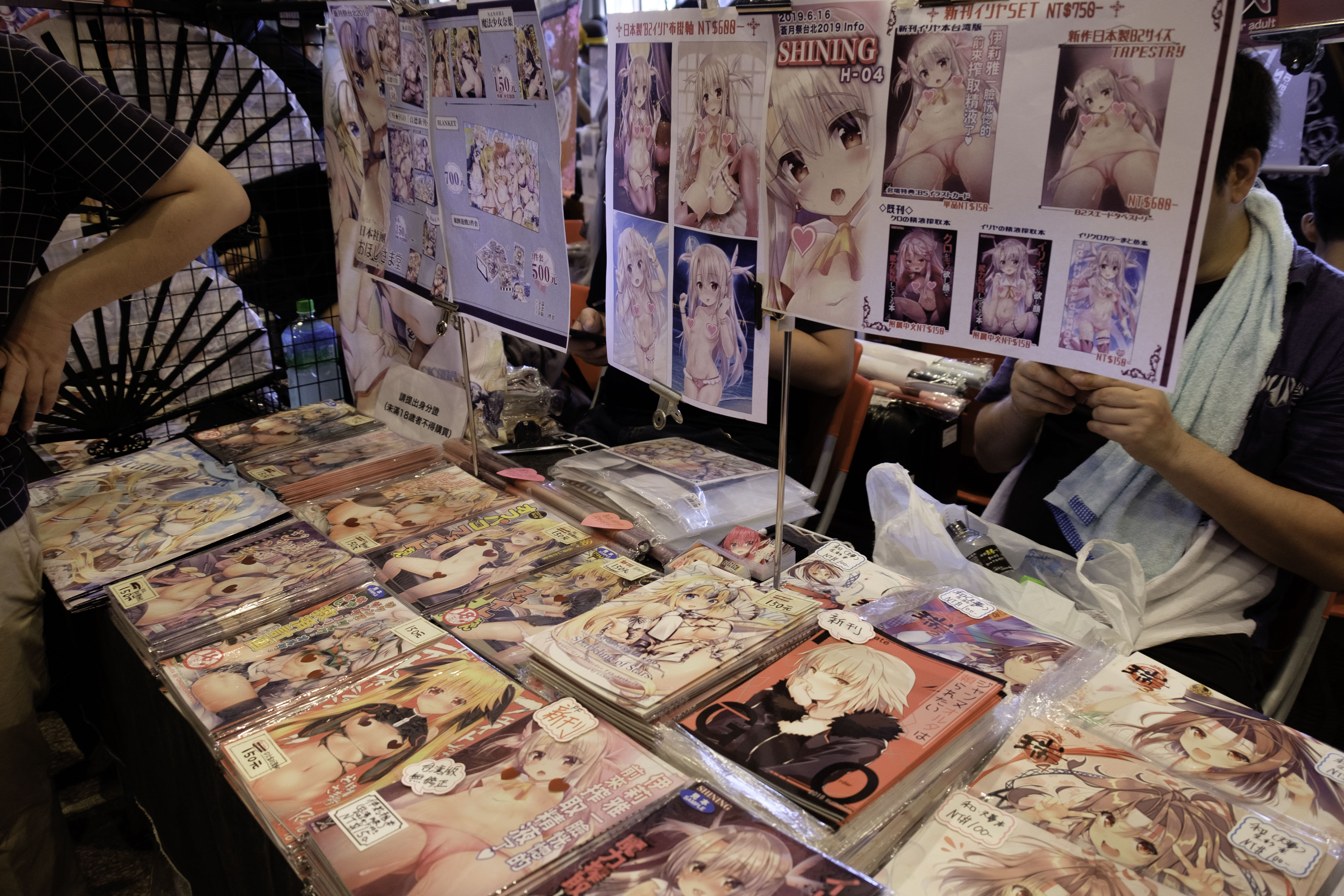
Lolicon fan-doujinshi being sold at the Hakurei Shrine Reitaisai in Taiwan 3, themed after characters from Fate/kaleid liner Prisma Illya and Mahou Shoujo Lyrical Nanoha, among others

Lolicon media is loosely defined. Some define its characters by age, while others define its characters by appearance (those which are small and flat-chested, independent of age). Lolicon works often depict girl characters as innocent, precocious, and sometimes flirtatious; characters may appear in borderline or outright sexual situations, though the term can be applied to works with neither. According to Kaoru Nagayama, manga readers define lolicon works as those "with a heroine younger than a middle school student", a definition which can vary from characters under age 18 for "society at large", to characters "younger than gradeschool-aged" for "fanatics", and to "kindergarteners" for "more pedophiliac readers". Girl characters in lolicon can display a contradictory performance of age in which their body, behavior, and role in a story conflict; for example, lolibaba (Note: ロリババア, roribabā) ("Lolita granny") characters speak and behave with the mannerisms of older women, which runs in contrast with their appearance or other aspects of their behaviors that may be seen as youthful. Curvy hips and other secondary sex characteristics similarly appear as features in many of the genre's characters, such as that of the loli kyonyuu (ロリ巨乳) trope showing the loli with large breasts. Plot devices often explain the young appearance of characters who are non-human or actually much older, although this is not always the case.

Akira Akagi identifies themes in lolicon manga including sadomasochism, "groping objects" (alien tentacles or robots in the role of the penis), "mecha fetishes" (combinations of a machine and a girl), erotic parodies of mainstream manga and anime, and "simply indecent or perverted stuff", also noting common themes of lesbianism and masturbation. Media scholar Setsu Shigematsu argues that forms of substitution and mimicry enable lolicon to "transform straight sex into a parodic form". More extreme works depict themes including coercion, rape, incest, bondage, and hermaphroditism. Nagayama argues that most pornographic lolicon manga deal with a "consciousness of sin", or a sense of taboo and guilt in its consumption. Some manga manage this by portraying the girl as enjoying the experience in the end, while others represent the girl as the active partner in sex who seduces men to her. Other lolicon manga, where "men are absolute evil and girls are pitiable victims", indulge in the "pleasure of sin" through the breaking of taboos, which he argues affirms the fragility of the characters. He posits that manga depicting sex between children avoid the "consciousness of sin" via mutual innocence, while also thematizing nostalgia and an idealized past, while other lolicon manga accomplish this through characters with especially unrealistic and moe designs, where "it is precisely because fiction is distinguished from reality as fiction that one can experience moe".

Lolicon manga, often published as dōjinshi or compiled in anthology magazines, is mostly consumed by male audiences, though Nagayama notes that the works of Hiraku Machida have "resonated with female readers" and "earned the support of women". Other notable artists include Aguda Wanyan, Takarada Gorgeous, and female creators Erika Wada and Fumio Kagami. Lolicon imagery is a prominent theme in Superflat, a manga-influenced art movement founded by Takashi Murakami. Superflat artists whose works incorporate lolicon include Mr. and Henmaru Machino.

=== Relation to moe ===
In the 1990s, lolicon imagery evolved and contributed to the mainstream development of moe, the generalized affective response to fictional characters (typically bishōjo characters in manga, anime, and computer games) and its associated design elements. The bishōjo character form moved from niche, otaku publications to mainstream manga magazines, and saw explosive popularity in the decade with the rise of bishōjo games and anime series such as Neon Genesis Evangelion, which pioneered media and merchandising based on fan affection for their female protagonists. Moe characters, which tend to be physically immature girl characters exemplified by cuteness, are ubiquitous in contemporary manga and anime. In contrast to lolicon, sexuality in moe is treated indirectly or not at all; the moe response is often defined with emphasis on platonic love. John Oppliger of AnimeNation identifies Ro-Kyu-Bu!, Kodomo no Jikan, and Moetan as examples of series which challenge the distinction between moe and lolicon through use of sexual innuendo, commenting that they "satire the chaste sanctity of the moé phenomenon" and "poke fun at viewers and the arbitrary delineations that viewers assert". "Moe-style" lolicon works depict mild eroticism, such as glimpses of underwear, and forgo explicit sex.

== Legality ==
Child pornography laws in some countries, including the United States, the United Kingdom, Ireland, Canada, Australia, and New Zealand, have expanded since the 1990s to include sexually explicit depictions of fictional child characters, while those in other countries, including Japan, exclude fiction from relevant definitions. In 1999, Japan passed a national law criminalizing the production and distribution of child pornography. The law's original draft included depictions of fictional children in its definition of child pornography; after "criticism from many in Japan", this text was removed in the final version. In 2014, Japan's parliament amended the 1999 law to criminalize possession of child pornography; the 2013 draft introduced by the Liberal Democratic Party (LDP), which maintained the existing legal definition, included a provision for a government investigation on whether manga, anime, and computer-generated images "similar to child pornography" were connected to child sexual abuse, which would be followed by a later decision on regulation. This provision was opposed by manga-related organizations, including the Japan Cartoonists Association, which argued that regulation would infringe upon freedom of expression and negatively impact the industry. The provision was removed from the final version of the law, which took effect in 2015.

Lolicon media is a common target of local ordinances in Japan which restrict distribution of materials designated "harmful to the healthy development of youth", which were strengthened throughout the 1990s and 2000s. An amendment proposed in 2010 to the Tokyo law on material banned from sale to minors (described by Vice Governor Naoki Inose as targeting non-pornographic lolicon manga, writing that "We had regulation for eromanga, but not for lolicon") restricted depictions of "non-existent youths" who appeared under age 18 and were portrayed in "anti-social sexual situations". After heavy opposition from manga creators, academics, and fans, the bill was rejected in June 2010 by the Tokyo Metropolitan Assembly; however, a new revision passed in December 2010 which restricts "manga, anime, and computer games" where any characters engage in "sexual or pseudo sexual acts that would be illegal in real life" depicted in a way that "glorifies or exaggerates" such acts. In 2011, several manga were listed for restriction, including Oku-sama wa Shōgakusei ("My Wife Is an Elementary Student"); it was published online by J-Comi, avoiding restriction. (Note: The first work to be formally restricted as "harmful" under the expanded law was the manga Imōto Paradise! 2 in 2014.)

Sexualized depictions of young girl characters have also been subject to censorship and restriction outside of Japan. In 2006, North American publisher Seven Seas Entertainment licensed the manga series Kodomo no Jikan for release under the title Nymphet, but cancelled its plans in 2007 after vendor cancellations. In a statement, the company stated that the manga "cannot be considered appropriate for the US market by any reasonable standard". In 2020, Australian senator Stirling Griff criticized the Australian Classification Board for giving ratings to manga and anime depicting "child exploitation", and called for a review of classification regulations; later that year, the board banned the import and sale of three volumes of the light novel series No Game No Life for sexual depiction of young characters. (Note: Light novels, including No Game No Life, typically include manga-style illustrations.) Some online platforms, including Discord, Reddit, and Twitter, actively ban lolicon content.

=== Debate ===
Explaining the exclusion of lolicon material from the 2014 child pornography law amendment, an LDP lawmaker stated that "manga, anime, and CG child pornography don't directly violate the rights of girls or boys" and that "it has not been scientifically validated that it even indirectly causes damage". Manga creators and activists argue that the Japanese constitution guarantees artistic freedom of expression, and that laws restricting lolicon material would be unconstitutional. Statistically, sexual abuse of minors in Japan has declined since the 1960s and 1970s as the prevalence of lolicon media has increased; cultural anthropologist Patrick W. Galbraith interprets this as evidence that lolicon imagery does not necessarily influence crimes, while Steven Smet suggests that lolicon is an "exorcism of fantasies" that contributes to Japan's low crime rates. Drawing on his fieldwork, Galbraith argues that otaku culture collectively promotes media literacy and an ethical position of separating fiction and reality, especially when the conflation of the two would be dangerous. A 2012 report by the Sexologisk Klinik for the Danish government found no evidence that individuals that view cartoons and drawings depicting fictitious child sexual abuse are more likely to engage in child sexual abuse in the real world. Sharalyn Orbaugh argues that manga depicting underage sexuality can help victims of child sexual abuse to work through their own trauma, and that there is greater harm in regulating sexual expression than potential harm caused by such manga.

Legal scholar Hiroshi Nakasatomi opines that lolicon material can distort consumers' sexual desires and induce crime, a view shared by the non-profit organization CASPAR, whose founder Kondo Mitsue argues that "freedom of expression does not allow for the depiction of little girls being violently raped, depriving them of their basic human rights". Some critics, such as the non-profit organization Lighthouse, argue that lolicon works can be used for sexual grooming, and that they encourage a culture which accepts sexual abuse of children. In 2015, the United Nations Special Rapporteur on the Sale and Sexual Exploitation of Children, Maud de Boer-Buquicchio, called for further discussion and research on "manga depicting extreme child pornography" and a resultant "banalization of child sexual abuse" in Japan, and called for a ban on such material. Guidelines released in 2019 by the United Nations Human Rights Committee encouraged state parties to include explicit drawings of fictional children in laws against child pornography, "in particular when such representations are used as part of a process to sexually exploit children". Feminist critic Kuniko Funabashi argues that the themes of lolicon material contribute to sexual violence by portraying girls passively and by "presenting the female body as the man's possession". Legal scholar Shin'ichirō Harata argues that child pornography laws should not collapse reality and fiction together, but also that fans should not dismiss an ambivalence represented by lolicon. He describes the practice of keeping the two separated as the "ethics of moe", or "responsibility of otaku".

== Analysis ==
Culture and media scholars responding to lolicon generally identify it as distinct from attraction to real young girls. Cultural anthropologist Patrick W. Galbraith finds that "from early writings to the present, researchers suggest that lolicon artists are playing with symbols and working with tropes, which does not reflect or contribute to sexual pathology or crime". Psychologist Tamaki Saitō, who has conducted clinical work with otaku, highlights an estrangement of lolicon desires from reality as part of a distinction for otaku between "textual and actual sexuality", and observes that "the vast majority of otaku are not pedophiles in actual life". Manga researcher Yukari Fujimoto argues that lolicon desire "is not for a child, but for the image itself", and that this is understood by those "brought up in [Japan's] culture of drawing and fantasy". Sociologist Mark McLelland identifies lolicon and yaoi as "self-consciously anti-realist" genres, given a rejection by fans and creators of "three-dimensionality" in favor of "two-dimensionality", and compares lolicon to the yaoi fandom, in which fans consume depictions of homosexuality which "lack any correspondent in the real world". Setsu Shigematsu argues that lolicon reflects a shift in "erotic investment" from reality to "two-dimensional figures of desire". Queer theorist Yuu Matsuura criticizes the classification of lolicon works as "child pornography" as an expression of "human-oriented sexualism" which marginalizes fictosexuality, or nijikon, describing sexual or affective attraction towards two-dimensional characters.

Many scholars also identify lolicon as a form of self-expression on the part of its male creators and consumers. Sociologist Sharon Kinsella suggests that for lolicon fans, "the infantilized female object of desire [...] has crossed over to become an aspect of their own self image and sexuality". Akira Akagi argues that lolicon manga represented a notable shift in reader identification from the "hero" penetrator common to pornographic gekiga: "Lolicon readers do not need a penis for pleasure, but rather they need the ecstasy of the girl. [...] They identify with the girl, and get caught up in a masochistic pleasure." Manga critic Gō Itō views this as an "abstract desire", quoting a lolicon artist who told him that "he was the girl who is raped in his manga", reflecting a feeling of being "raped by society, or by the world". Kaoru Nagayama posits that lolicon readers adopt a fluid perspective that alternates between that of an omniscient voyeur and the multiple characters in a work, reflecting an active reader role and a projection onto girl characters. Writing in The Book of Otaku (1989), feminist Chizuko Ueno argued that lolicon, as an orientation towards fictional bishōjo, is "completely different from pedophilia", and characterized it as a desire to "be part of the 'cute' world of shōjo" for male fans of shōjo manga who "find it too much to be a man".

Several scholars identify the emergence of lolicon with changes in Japanese gender relations. Sociologist Kimio Itō attributes the rise of lolicon manga to a shift in the 1970s and 1980s, when boys, driven by a feeling that girls were "surpassing them in terms of willpower and action", turned to the "world of imagination", in which young girl characters are "easy to control". Kinsella interprets lolicon as part of a "gaze of both fear and desire" stimulated by the growing power of women in society, and as a reactive desire to see the shōjo "infantilized, undressed, and subordinate". Media scholar Chizuko Naitō views lolicon as reflecting a broader "societal desire" for young girls as sex symbols in Japan (which she calls a "loliconized society"). Cultural anthropologist Christine Yano argues that eroticized imagery of the shōjo, "real or fictive", reflects "heteronormative pedophilia" in which emphasis is placed on the ephemerality of childhood: "it is as child that [the shōjo] becomes precious as a transitory figure threatened by impending adulthood".

== See also ==
- Cartoon pornography
- Junior idol – child or teenage entertainer in Japanese pop culture
- Lolita fashion – Japanese fashion style and subculture
- Shotacon – male equivalent of lolicon, focused on young boy characters
- Simulated child pornography – produced without direct involvement of children
- Victimless crime – illegal acts which do not directly involve others
- Video game controversies
- Wisdom of repugnance
- Glossary of anime and manga – terms relating to Japanese subcultural media

=== Further reading in other languages ===
- Lolicon Manga via Wikipedia Japan
