= Mail (manga) =

Japanese horror manga series by Housui Yamazaki

- The cover of the first volume of Mail
- Genre: Horror
- Manga
- Written by: Housui Yamazaki
- Published by: Kadokawa Shoten
- English publisher: NA: Dark Horse Manga
- Magazine: Shōnen Ace
- Original run: 2004 – 2005
- Volumes: 3
- Live-action film
- Directed by: Iwao Takahashi
- Released: 2004

Mail is a Japanese horror manga series written and illustrated by Housui Yamazaki. The English translation is published by Dark Horse Comics.

The series centers around Reiji Akiba (秋葉 零児, Akiba Reiji), a private eye who investigates cases dealing with ghosts. He uses a broomhandle pistol called Kagutsuchi (迦具土, Kagutsuchi) and hallowed ammunition to shoot ghosts that may or may not have possessed people and seal them inside the bullets which simply drop to the floor. The bullets are later ritually cleansed at a shrine. The pistol also has the ability to revive the dead by shooting a bullet with a ghost sealed inside into its original body. Akiba does this at the beginning of the third and final volume with the ghost of his childhood friend Mikoto Yamaguchi (山口 美琴, Yamaguchi Mikoto) and she becomes his sidekick.

The series is organized into short self-contained chapters with no overarching plot, though some chapters explore Akiba's backstory. However, most are simple cases that Akiba solves, usually with an introduction by Akiba talking to the reader at the beginning of the chapter.

A Japanese live-action movie adaption has been created from the series. In the movie version Takamasa Suga plays the role of Akiba while Mikoto is played by Chiaki Kuriyama.

== List of chapters ==
No.	Original release date	Original ISBN	English release date	English ISBN
1	July 1, 2004	978-4-04713-634-2	December 06, 2006	978-1-59307-566-8
"The Whine Cellar"; "Hide-and-seek"; "Twins"; "The drive"; "Ka-tsu-mi"; "Eyesight"
In the first chapter, a headless skeleton is discovered during a nude photoshoot at a rural stream. One of the photos has the figure of a headless girl in the background. The photographers ask Akiba to investigate. In chapter two, the occupant of a flat gets a letter from Akiba warning her of a ghost of a child playing hide-and-seek in her apartment building. The third chapter has Akiba investigate on behalf of a girl that is terrorized by the ghost of her deceased twin sister. In the fourth chapter, Akiba is racing after a woman who bought a car with a ghost in the trunk. Chapter five has Akiba investigating a case in which a girl died fulfilling an urban legend in which everyone who photographs a ghost is killed. The final chapter deals with Akiba's backstory: he was blind from birth, but medicine cured his eyes. When he was in the hospital, he met a bearded man with glasses who tells him he would see even more things in the future.
2	August 1, 2004	978-4-04713-635-9	January 31, 2007	978-1-59307-591-0
"The doll"; "The baby"; "The elevator"; "The cottage"; "The commencement"; "The portrait"
The first case deals with a possessed doll. The second chapter has a woman and her infant son being terrorized by the ghost of the stalker of her husband. The third case is about a ghost split in half due to an elevator accident. In chapter four, three youths find evidence of outerworldly activity in the cottage they are staying at. The fifth chapter is about a woman whose GPS device is constantly rerouting her to the location of her elementary school. The final chapter of the volume deals with a possessed portrait.
3	February 25, 2005	978-4-04713-704-2	March 14, 2007	978-1-59307-592-7
"Mikoto"; "Cries of agony"; "Suppressed"; "Motherly instinct"; "Seafloor"; "Ruins"
In first chapter, Akiba ties up loose ends from his childhood when he was blind. He seals the ghost of a deceased girl named Mikoto he played with as a child into a bullet, then shoots that bullet into a body he assembled, reanimating her. In the second chapter, Akiba requests Mikoto to stay at their apartment because she attracts ghosts. Promptly, a ghost starts to haunt the apartment. The third chapter is about the ghost of an e-mail stalker haunting its old contacts. Chapter four has a woman return to the hotel in which her child has died. The fifth chapter has three teenage girls going for a swim at a small beach. One of the girls had found a message in a bottle as a child reading "I'm in the sea. Find me.". In the final chapter, a different group of teenage girls are playing a game trying to find if one of them is haunted by a ghost.
