= Bishōjo =

Cute girl character in manga and anime

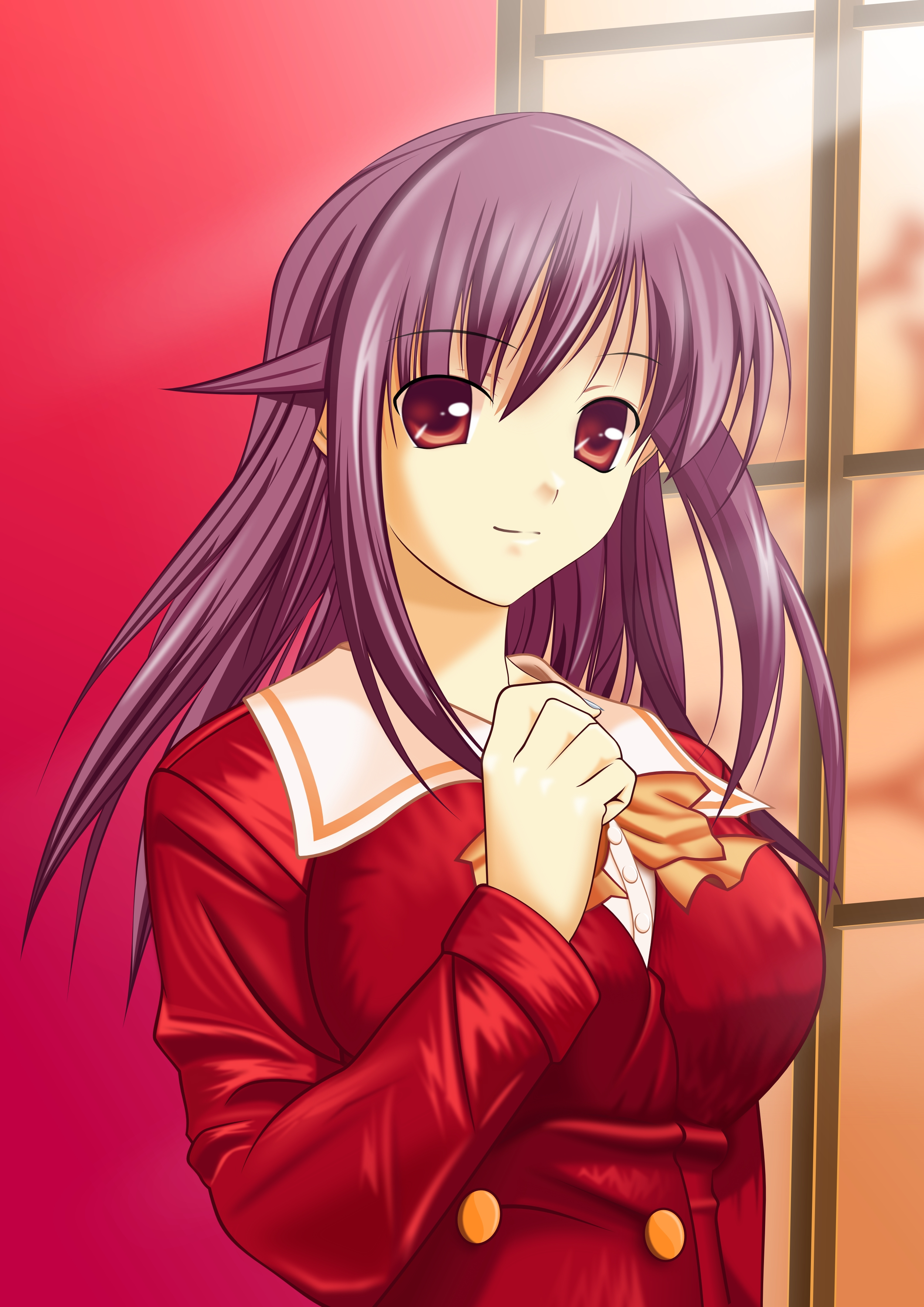
Moe-style illustration of an original bishōjo character

In Japanese popular culture, a bishōjo (美少女; lit. "beautiful girl"), also romanized as bishojo or bishoujo, is a character who is typically an attractive young girl or woman. Bishōjo characters are ubiquitous in media including manga, anime, and computerized games (especially in the bishojo game genre), and also appear in advertising and as mascots, such as for maid cafés. An attraction to bishōjo characters is a key element of otaku (manga and anime fan) culture.

The development of the bishōjo aesthetic in manga of the early 1980s marked a departure from previous realistic styles and the emergence of the aesthetic of "cute eroticism" (kawaii ero) and moe.

== History ==
The bishōjo character type emerged during the lolicon boom of the early 1980s, particularly in the works of manga artist Hideo Azuma. Azuma's characters combined the round-bodied features of Osamu Tezuka characters with the emotive, rounded faces of shōjo manga. At the time, the dominant style in seinen and pornographic manga was gekiga, a realistic style marked by sharp angles, heavy hatching, and gritty linework. In contrast, Azuma's artwork featured light shading and clean, circular lines. Azuma developed a style called "cute eroticism" (kawaii ero), centered on manga-style characters.

Lolicon (derived from "Lolita complex") was one of several terms used to describe the rise of cute characters in manga and anime, and a corresponding attraction to or affection for such characters. Related terms include "two-dimensional complex" (nijigen konpurekkusu), "two-dimensional fetishism" (nijikon fechi), "two-dimensional syndrome" (nijikon shōkōgun), "cute girl syndrome" (bishōjo shōkōgun), and "sickness" (byōki).

Several characters created by Hayao Miyazaki are considered icons of the bishōjo boom, particularly Clarisse from Lupin III: Castle of Cagliostro (1979), Lana from the TV series Future Boy Conan (1978), and Nausicaä from his manga and film Nausicaä of the Valley of the Wind (1984). Another creator strongly associated with the boom is Rumiko Takahashi, whose character Lum from her manga Urusei Yatsura (1978–1987) gained immense popularity. Cultural critic Hiroki Azuma identifies Lum as a key development in fan interaction and response to bishōjo characters:

I first visited Tokyo's gathering for producers of fanzines, the Comic Market, in 1984 or 1985, and fanzines devoted to characters from manga and anime series such as Urusei Yatsura ... were everywhere. The fans were responding to characters, without a doubt. Actually, to me, Urusei Yatsura is really an ancestor of bishōjo games and moe media—a completely useless male character is surrounded by all these cute girl characters, including Lum, an alien girl who wears a bikini and is in love with this male character.

== Features ==
Bishōjo characters are typified by design elements (such as personality archetypes, clothing, and accessories) that are known and acknowledged by the audience. They usually have large eyes, small chins, and compact faces.

== Media ==
Bishōjo characters appear in almost all genres of anime and manga and in many video games, especially in dating sims and visual novels, sometimes to get more players or simply just to make a game look good. Bishōjo characters tend to attract male viewers. Bishōjo characters sometimes are the most popular female characters as most people like anime, manga, dating sims, and visual novels more when the art stands out, looks pretty, and has beautiful girls.

=== Bishōjo games ===
Games that feature bishōjo characters are known as bishōjo games. Because visual novels are also considered games, bishōjo games also encapsulate visual novels that feature bishōjo characters. Although bishōjo games are made with a male audience in mind, they can extend to a female audience as well, such as the Touhou Project.

=== Confusion regarding terminology ===
Although bishōjo is not a genre but a character design, series that predominantly feature such characters, such as harem anime and visual novels, are sometimes informally called bishōjo series. The characters and works referred to by the term bishōjo are typically intended to appeal to men. Since one of the main draws of these series is the art and attractive female characters, the term is occasionally perceived unfavorably, as a genre dependent on the marketability of beautiful characters rather than content or plot.

The word bishōjo is sometimes confused with the similar-sounding shōjo ("girl") demographic, but bishōjo refers to the gender and traits of the characters it describes, whereas shōjo refers to the gender and age of an audience demographic; manga publications, and sometimes anime, described as "shōjo", are aimed at young female audiences.

Bishōjo is not to be confused with bishōnen – a beautiful boy. It is also not to be confused with moe, a genre of entertainment that features cute/adorable girls rather than "sexy" girls. But elements of moe and Bishōjo are often blended, so the two elements are closely entwined and cannot be completely separated.

== See also ==
- Beautiful Fighting Girl
- Bishōnen
- Bishōjo game
- Kawaii
- Moe (slang)
