= Pedobear =

Internet meme

Depiction of Pedobear

Pedobear is an Internet meme that became popular through the imageboard 4chan. As the name suggests, ("pedo" being short for "pedophile") it is portrayed as a pedophilic cartoon bear. It is a concept used to mock child sex offenders or people who have any sexual interest in children or "jailbait". The bear image has been likened to bait used to lure children or as a mascot for pedophiles.

== Origin ==
The bear character originates from the popular textboard website 2channel in Japan, where it was introduced, in the form of Shift_JIS art, as クマー (Kumā), a made-up interjection based on the Japanese word for bear, kuma.

Various posts modified it until reaching the final form as multi-line art:

      ∩＿＿＿∩
     |ノ      ヽ
    /   ●    ● | クマ──！！
   |     (_●_) ミ
  彡､     |∪|  ､｀＼
/ ＿＿    ヽノ /´>   )
(＿＿＿）     /  (_／
  |        /
  |   ／＼  ＼
  | /     )   )
   ∪     （   ＼
           ＼＿)

The Kumā character was adopted by 4chan and quickly became a meme there, especially on the /b/ board. On 2ch, Kumā was often depicted in images sleeping with children, and this was promptly exploited on 4chan to create the Pedobear persona. Soon it gained its representation as an image rather than text art, and started being superimposed in pictures depicting children (especially if these pictures could be interpreted as sexually suggestive, such as when involving swimsuits, underwear or child beauty pageants). Another common use of the character was to mock or otherwise signal the posting of borderline child erotica content, sometimes with references to the FBI or Chris Hansen, the host of the TV show To Catch a Predator.

== Mainstream media ==
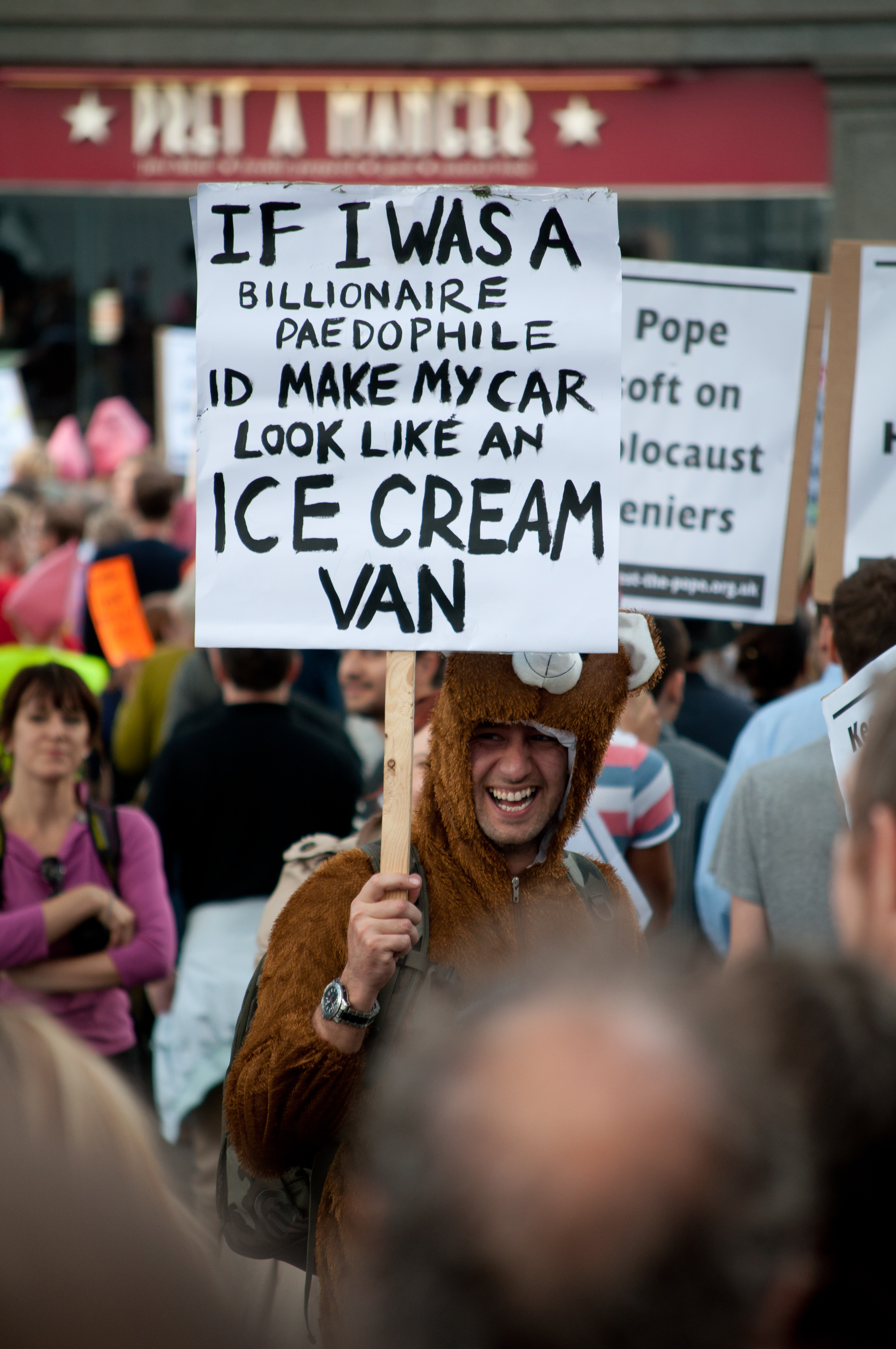
Protester in London dressed as Pedobear to protest a visit by Pope Benedict XVI in 2010

Pedobear eventually became known outside 4chan as it was referenced by newspapers and prominent websites. In the media it was frequently claimed to be a mascot of child sex offenders, which is contested by meme catalogs who note that its intent is actually to mock pedophiles.

Pedobear was used in a CollegeHumor video parodying the film Doubt.

On 3 July 2009, Canadian artist Michael R. Barrick created two composite images depicting Pedobear grouped together with the mascots of 2010 Winter Olympic and Paralympic Games. One is based on the official art, and the other is based on fanart created by Angela Melick. This image was then mistakenly used by other media, most notably the Polish newspaper Gazeta Olsztyńska for a 4 February 2010 front-page story about the Olympics in Vancouver.

On 24 July 2009, a column in the far-right Taki's Magazine by conservative commentator Pat Buchanan about the early months of Barack Obama's presidency included an image of Pedobear, which generated considerable reaction from non-political commentators.

Other uses of Pedobear include an iStockphoto wallpaper, a cover of the auto magazine Import Tuner, and a flyer of a costume store in Portland, Oregon, which accidentally featured a Pedobear-like figure. The incident in Portland was covered by a local news station, which provided a detailed history of Pedobear, and even interviewed Cheezburger Network's CEO Ben Huh about Pedobear's cultural significance.

In September 2010, cosplay participants dressed as the character were accused of being potential child sex offenders, after the San Luis Obispo County Sheriff's Department issued a warning that Pedobear was a sign of the presence of pedophiles and other people with inappropriate sexual behavior, and suggested that Pedobear was a kind of mascot among pedophiles. Law enforcement officials in San Diego later sent a warning to local media, warning parents that the image can indicate the presence of predators. They also issued a bulletin:

Since the Comic Con, law enforcement in San Diego... has come across PedoBear's image in situations during which they were contacting those that exploit and/or abuse children. [...]

The intention of this bulletin is (...) [to] alert citizens that [PedoBear's] presence may be an indicator of the presence of individuals who have a predilection to sexually inappropriate, or even, assaultive behaviour. While not an absolute, the image of PedoBear should be a sign that you should use caution with whatever situation you are in or the individuals involved.

— Public Safety Bulletin. A Seemingly Innocent Menace. An Introduction to "PEDO BEAR", p. 2

Gawker later reported that it had spoken to the San Luis Obispo Sheriff's Department, and that the department knew it was an "Internet joke", despite the fact that they had referred to pedophiles adopting it as a mascot. Two local television stations, KSBY and KCOY-TV, passed on the warning to their viewers. In Tulsa, Oklahoma, Sgt. John Adams of the Tulsa Police Department Child Exploitation Unit falsely told local television stations KOKI-TV and KOTV that the person wearing the costume was a registered sex offender, a claim which was later retracted.

Coupon book ad of the Florida-based computer repair business, "CP Distributor"

On March 22, 2011, the blog Urlesque posted a photograph of a coupon book advertisement for "CP Distributor", a computer repair business in Polk County, Florida, that prominently featured the Pedobear image. "CP" when paired with the Pedobear meme normally stands for child porn.

In July 2011, a Pedobear iPhone application, released a few weeks earlier on June 25, was removed from Apple's App Store. It contained a series of dance moves and background music, with the mascot branded as "Cuddle Bear".

On December 15, 2011, a citywide alert was issued by the Pierre Police Department after images of Pedobear had been sighted in certain parts of the city.

In March 2012, a primary school in Christchurch, New Zealand was notified by the public of the meaning of a student-created poster portraying Pedobear in a classroom window. The poster was left displayed to the public for some time.

On July 19, 2012, the Nestlé food company took down the inaugural Instagram photo from its Kit Kat chocolate bar's Facebook page because it featured a person dressed as a bear that some Internet users quickly pointed out resembled the Pedobear cartoon. Nestlé itself had produced the image, and officials claimed they were completely unaware of the Pedobear meme.
