= Jailbait images =

Sexualized images of minors

Jailbait images are sexualized images of minors who are perceived to meet the definition of jailbait. They can be differentiated from child pornography as they do not usually contain nudity. Jailbait depicts tweens or young teens in skimpy clothing such as bikinis, short skirts, or underwear.

The online distribution of these images has caused legal and moral controversy, in some cases leading to the censorship of both the images and the word itself as a search term.

== Legality, censorship and online impact ==
The legal status of jailbait images is unclear. When questioned regarding their legality, legal analyst Jeffrey Toobin stated he thought it was not illegal, though legal expert Sunny Hostin was more skeptical, describing them as "borderline" child pornography which may be illegal. While the images may be legal, they are often considered to be in poor taste. Jailbait is amongst the list of banned hashtags at the photo-sharing website Instagram, and the social networking website Tumblr. The term is also blocked on Google Instant. The images have been defended on the grounds of free speech, and have also been defended on the grounds they are similar to mainstream sexualized images of minors, such as those in the music video for "...Baby One More Time" by Britney Spears, who was 16 years old at the time of filming. Jailbait images are often collected directly from girls' social media profiles.

Numerous webpages and forums are devoted to the images. As well as uploading and sharing images, popular discussion topics at jailbait communities include ephebophilia, the difference between ephebophilia and pedophilia, and debating whether images of certain teens are too young or old to be classified as jailbait. Vice magazine commented on the lack of attention the press paid to the role popular jailbait image boards had on the suicide of Amanda Todd. An individual who was alleged to be harassing Todd prior to her suicide was tracked down by posts and images he uploaded to jailbait forums on the Internet. They also describe online jailbait communities as "a very insidious force on the Internet that is pitting overly clever pedophiles against insecure teenagers." They have also been said to "offer a window into a disturbing mindset." Self-identified pedophiles can be found in jailbait communities.

=== Reddit controversy ===
The most infamous online jailbait community was the subreddit section "/r/jailbait" on the website Reddit. It was the first result when searching for "jailbait" on Google, and was at one point the second largest search term that brought visitors to Reddit, topped only by the word "Reddit" itself.

The jailbait subreddit received widespread attention after Anderson Cooper devoted a segment of his TV program on September 29, 2011, to condemning both the subreddit itself and Reddit for hosting it. On October 10, 2011 the subreddit was shut down by Reddit administrators.

== See also ==
- Child erotica
- COPINE scale
- Hebephilia
- Junior idol
- Lolicon
- Nude depictions of youth
- Shotacon
