= Child pornography laws in the United States =

President Reagan's remarks at the signing ceremony of the Child Protection Act on May 21, 1984

In the United States, child pornography is illegal under federal law and is punishable by up to life imprisonment and fines of up to $250,000. U.S. laws regarding child pornography are virtually always enforced and amongst the sternest in the world. The Supreme Court of the United States has found child pornography to be outside the protections of the First Amendment to the United States Constitution. Federal sentencing guidelines on child pornography differentiate between production, distribution, and purchasing/receiving, and also include variations in severity based on the age of the child involved in the materials, with significant increases in penalties when the offense involves a prepubescent child. U.S. law distinguishes between pornographic images of an actual minor, realistic images that are not of an actual minor, and non-realistic images such as drawings. The latter two categories are legally protected unless found to be obscene, whereas the first does not require a finding of obscenity.

Child pornography first became illegal at the federal level in 1978, with the enactment of the Protection of Children Against Sexual Exploitation Act of 1977. Before the 1978 law, child pornography was illegal in only six states. The 1978 law was subsequently strengthened in 1984, with the passage of the Child Protection Act. It was a goal of the Reagan administration to crack down on child pornography, with then-president Reagan stating the following in 1987: "[T]his Administration is putting the purveyors of illegal obscenity and child pornography on notice: your industry's days are numbered." Further federal legislation, such as the PROTECT Act of 2003, has been enacted since then.

== History ==
Laws targeting child pornography were not enacted until the 1970s, following growing public awareness of the issue. Prior to the rise of the Internet, child pornography was traded and distributed through covert, offline means. These included underground networks operating in adult movie theaters, sex shops, and private clubs, where such material was often hidden or kept under the counter for trusted customers.

With the advent of the internet in the 1990s, the availability and distribution of child pornography increased dramatically. The anonymity and accessibility provided by digital platforms led to a surge in the production and consumption of child pornography. As a result, law enforcement efforts intensified, and legal frameworks evolved to address these changes. Early laws typically focused on prosecuting those who produced or distributed child sex abuse material, but as the Internet facilitated broader access, laws were expanded to target individuals who possessed or accessed child pornography.

== Definition of child pornography under federal law ==
Child pornography under federal law is defined as any visual depiction of sexually explicit conduct involving a minor (someone under 18 years of age). Visual depictions include photographs, videos, digital or computer generated images indistinguishable from an actual minor, and images created, adapted, or modified, but appear to depict a minor who is recognizable as an actual person by the person's face, likeness, or other distinguishing characteristic. Undeveloped film, undeveloped videotape, and electronically stored data that can be converted into a visual image of child pornography are also deemed illegal visual depictions under federal law. The United States Court of Appeals for the Second Circuit held that images created by superimposing the face of a child on sexually explicit photographs of legal adults are not protected speech under the First Amendment. However, the U.S. Supreme Court ruled that "virtual child pornography" is constitutionally protected speech, except when it meets the criteria of obscenity.

The age of consent for sexual activity in a given state is irrelevant; any visual depiction of a person under 18 engaging in sexually explicit conduct is illegal. Federal prosecutors have secured convictions carrying mandatory minimum sentence of 15 years' imprisonment for producing visual depictions of individuals above the legal age of consent but under the age of 18, even when there was no intent to distribute such content. The legal definition of sexually explicit conduct does not require that an image depict a child engaging in sexual activity. A picture of a naked child may constitute illegal child pornography if it is sufficiently sexually suggestive.

Federal law prohibits the production, distribution, reception, and possession of an image of child pornography using or affecting any means or facility of interstate or foreign commerce (18 U.S.C. § 2251; 18 U.S.C. § 2252; 18 U.S.C. § 2252A). Specifically, Section 2251 makes it illegal to persuade, induce, entice, or coerce a minor to engage in sexually explicit conduct for purposes of producing visual depictions of that conduct. Any individual who attempts or conspires to commit a child pornography offense is also subject to prosecution under federal law.

Federal jurisdiction is implicated if the child pornography offense occurred in interstate or foreign commerce. This includes, for example, using the U.S. Mails or common carriers to transport child pornography across state or international borders. Federal jurisdiction almost always applies when the Internet is used to commit a child pornography violation. Even if the child pornography image itself did not travel across state or international borders, federal law may be implicated if the materials, such as the computer used to download the image or the CD-ROM used to store the image, originated or previously traveled in interstate or foreign commerce.

In addition, Section 2251A of Title 18, United States Code, specifically prohibits any parent, legal guardian, or other person in custody or control of a minor, to buy, sell, or transfer custody of that minor for purposes of producing child pornography.

Lastly, Section 2260 of Title 18, United States Code, prohibits any persons outside of the United States to knowingly produce, receive, transport, ship, or distribute child pornography with intent to import or transmit the visual depiction into the United States.

== Consequences of conviction under federal law ==
Under federal law, a finding of guilt of most child pornography-related offenses carries severe penalties, such as mandatory minimum sentences of several years and registration as a sex offender.

A first-time offender convicted of producing child pornography under Title 18 U.S.C. § 2251 faces fines and a statutory minimum of 15 to 30 years in prison.

Child pornography offenses for transportation (including mailing or shipping), receipt, distribution, and possession with the intent to distribute or sell child pornography each carries a mandatory minimum term of 5 years' imprisonment and a maximum of 20 years.

Simple possession of child pornography is punishable by up to 10 years in federal prison and has no mandatory minimum. If a defendant has a prior federal or state conviction for one or more enumerated sex offenses, the penalty may be enhanced.

Federal sentencing guidelines provide for higher sentences based on the number of images possessed or distributed, whether the victims were 12 years of age or younger, whether the material is "sadistic," and other factors.

== Reporting requirements ==
Under the Crime Victims' Rights Act (CVRA), 46 codified at 18 U.S.C. § 3771, federal law enforcement officials must notify a child pornography victim (or his or her guardian if the victim is still a minor) each time the officials charge an offender with a child pornography offense related to an image depicting the victim. Such notifications can be emotionally traumatic.

== Obscenity as a form of unprotected speech ==
In the United States, pornography is considered a form of personal expression governed by the First Amendment to the United States Constitution. Pornography is generally protected speech, unless it is obscene, as the Supreme Court of the United States held in 1973 in Miller v. California.

Child pornography is also not protected by the First Amendment, but importantly, for different reasons. In 1982 the Supreme Court held in New York v. Ferber that child pornography, even if not obscene, is not protected speech. The court gave a number of justifications why child pornography should not be protected, including that the government has a compelling interest in safeguarding the physical and psychological well-being of minors.

== Record-keeping requirements ==
The initial iteration of 18 U.S.C. § 2257, first passed in 1988, mandated that producers of pornographic media keep records of the age and identity of performers and affix statements as to the location of the records to depictions. However, rather than penalties for noncompliance, the statute created a rebuttable presumption that the performer was a minor. Pub. L. 100-690. This version was struck down as unconstitutional under the First Amendment in American Library Association v. Thornburgh, 713 F. Supp. 469 (D.D.C. 1989), vacated as moot, 956 F.2d 1178 (D.C. Cir. 1992).

After Thornburgh, Congress amended 2257 to impose direct criminal penalties for noncompliance with the record-keeping requirements. The same plaintiffs challenged the amended statute and accompanying regulations, but the new version was upheld in American Library Association v. Reno, 33 F.3d 78 (D.C. Cir. 1994).

In Sundance Association, Inc. v. Reno, 139 F.3d 804 (10th Cir. 1998), the Tenth Circuit rejected the regulation's distinction between primary and secondary producers and entirely exempted from the record-keeping requirements those who merely distribute or those whose activity "does not involve hiring, contracting for, managing, or otherwise arranging for the participation of the performers depicted". 18 U.S.C. § 2257(h)(3).

However, after 2257 was amended in 2006 by the Adam Walsh Act, the court ruled that Sundance's restrictions no longer applied to the amended statute and generally ruled in the government's favor on its motion for summary judgment. Free Speech Coalition v. Gonzales, 483 F. Supp. 2d 1069 (D. Colo. 2006).

== Simulated pornography ==
An attempt at outlawing simulated child pornography was made with the Child Pornography Prevention Act of 1996 (CPPA). The CPPA was short-lived however. In 2002, the Supreme Court of the United States in Ashcroft v. Free Speech Coalition held that the relevant portions of the CPPA were unconstitutional because they prevented lawful speech. Referring to Ferber, the court stated that "the CPPA prohibits speech that records no crime and creates no victims by its production. Virtual child pornography is not 'intrinsically related' to the sexual abuse of children".

== 1466A - Obscene visual representations of the sexual abuse of children ==
In response to the demise of the CPPA, on April 30, 2003, President George W. Bush signed into law the PROTECT Act of 2003 (also known as the Amber Alert Law).

The law enacted 18 U.S.C. § 1466A, which criminalizes material that has "a visual depiction of any kind, including a drawing, cartoon, sculpture or painting" that "depicts a minor engaging in sexually explicit conduct and is obscene" or "depicts an image that is, or appears to be, of a minor engaging in ... sexual intercourse ... and lacks serious literary, artistic, political, or scientific value". By its own terms, the law does not make all simulated child pornography illegal, only that found to be obscene or lacking in serious value.

In November 2005 in Richmond, Virginia, Dwight Whorley was convicted under 18 U.S.C. sec. 1466A for using a Virginia Employment Commission computer to receive "obscene Japanese anime cartoons that graphically depicted prepubescent female children being forced to engage in genital-genital and oral-genital intercourse with adult males". He was also convicted of possessing child pornography involving real children. He was sentenced to 20 years in prison.

On December 18, 2008, the Fourth Circuit Court of Appeals affirmed the conviction. The court stated that "it is not a required element of any offense under this section that the minor depicted actually exists [sic]". Attorneys for Mr. Whorley have said that they will appeal to the Supreme Court.

The request for en banc rehearing of United States v. Whorley from the Court of Appeals was denied on June 15, 2009. A petition for writ of certiorari was filed with the Supreme Court on September 14, 2009, and denied on January 11, 2010, without comment.

== Section 2252A ==
The PROTECT Act also amended 18 U.S.C. § 2252A, which was part of the original CPPA. The amendment added paragraph (a)(3), which criminalizes knowingly advertising or distributing "an obscene visual depiction of a minor engaging in sexually explicit conduct; or a visual depiction of an actual minor engaging in sexually explicit conduct". The law draws a distinction between obscene depiction of any minor, and mere depiction of an actual minor.

The bill addresses various aspects of child abuse, prohibiting some illustrations and computer-generated images depicting children in a pornographic manner. Provisions against virtual child pornography in the Child Pornography Prevention Act of 1996 were ruled unconstitutional by the U.S. Supreme Court in 2002 on the grounds that the restrictions on speech were not justified by a compelling government interest (such as protecting real children). The provisions of the PROTECT Act instead prohibit such material if it qualifies as obscene as defined by the Miller test; the Supreme Court has ruled that such material is not protected by the First Amendment.

In May 2008, the Supreme Court upheld the 2003 federal law Section 2252A(a)(3)(B) of Title 18, United States Code that criminalizes the pandering and solicitation of child pornography, in a 7–2 ruling penned by Justice Antonin Scalia. The court ruling dismissed the United States Court of Appeals for the 11th Circuit's finding the law unconstitutionally vague. Attorney James R. Marsh, founder of the Children's Law Center in Washington, D.C., wrote that although the Supreme Court's decision has been criticized by some, he believes it correctly enables legal personnel to fight crime networks where child pornography is made and sold.

== Further developments ==
In 1994, the U.S. Court of Appeals for the 3rd Circuit ruled in United States v. Knox that the federal statute contains no requirement that genitals be visible or discernible. The court ruled that non-nude visual depictions can qualify as lascivious exhibitions and that this construction does not render the statute unconstitutionally overbroad.

In 2014, the Supreme Judicial Court of Massachusetts found that certain photos of nude children, culled from ethnographic and nudist publications, were not lascivious exhibitions and hence were not pornographic; the court ordered dropping of charges against a prisoner who had been found in possession of the photos.

In at least one instance, in North Carolina, teenagers in the United States have been prosecuted as adults for possession of images of themselves.

== See also ==
- Dost test
- Legality of child pornography
  - Child pornography laws in Canada
  - Child pornography laws in Australia
  - Child pornography laws in the United Kingdom
  - Child pornography laws in Portugal
  - Child pornography laws in the Netherlands
  - Child pornography laws in Japan
  - Child pornography in the Philippines
