= Duncan Shaw =

Duncan Shaw may refer to:

- Duncan Shaw (judge)
- Duncan Shaw (rugby union)
- Duncan Shaw (minister, born 1925)
- Duncan Shaw (minister, born 1727)
