= Child pornography laws in Canada =

In Canada, child pornography is illegal under Section 163.1 of the Criminal Code and is punishable by up to ten or fourteen years of imprisonment depending on the offence. The Supreme Court of Canada has found child pornography, including the simple possession of child pornography, to not be protected by the Canadian Charter of Rights and Freedoms. In October 2024, a private member's bill was passed which generally retitles references to "child pornography" as "child sexual abuse material". The law took effect in October 2025. Some current law is unenforceable to the extent of exemptions carved out by the Supreme Court of Canada in R v Sharpe.

The statute does not differentiate between pornographic images of an actual minor, realistic images that are not of an actual minor, non-realistic images such as drawings, and non-visual material of any kind, including writing, audio, sex dolls, and visual depictions generated by artificial intelligence; under the statute, any visual depiction, written material or material of any kind that depicts a person who is or is depicted as being under the age of eighteen years and engaged in or depicted as engaged in explicit sexual activity, or the dominant characteristic of which is the depiction, for a sexual purpose, of a sexual organ or the anal region of a person under the age of eighteen years, is unlawful. Certain portions of the law concerning one-year mandatory minimums for possession and making of child pornography have since been struck down as unconstitutional.

== History ==
Although attempts to ban the material can be found as far back as 1977, and the Government of Canada established a commission on reporting on child sexual abuse and exploitation in 1983, the current ban dates to June 23, 1993, when the Parliament of Canada passed Bill C-128 into law.

The bill had been introduced by Pierre Blais, the justice minister of then-prime minister Brian Mulroney, and became law with the assistance of the Campbell ministry. Although the wording of the bill was criticized in committee and by artists and civil libertarians, Bill C-128 came into force on August 1, 1993. Before the 1993 law, the only realistic provision that could have been used to charge offenders was the obscenity law, Section 163, at issue in R v Butler.

== Visual and written representations ==
Prohibition covers the visual representations of child sexual abuse and other sexual activity by persons (real or imaginary) under the age of 18 years or the depiction of their sexual organ/anal region for a sexual purpose, unless an artistic, educational, scientific, or medical justification can be provided and the court accepts that.

It also includes the written depictions of persons or characters (fictional or non-fictional) under the age of 18 engaging in sexual activity. Courts in Canada can also issue orders for the deletion of material from the internet from any computer system within the court's jurisdiction.

== The Internet ==
In 2002, laws passed addressing child pornography on the Internet, regulating the nature of live-time chatting and email communications that may relate to grooming children for pornographic (e.g., web cam) or other sexual purposes. The laws also criminalize the possessing of child pornography.

== Criminal Code provisions ==
Canadian laws addressing child pornography are set out in Part V of Criminal Code dealing with Sexual Offences, Public Morals and Disorderly Conduct: Offences Tending to Corrupt Morals. Section 163.1 of the Code defines child pornography to include "a visual representation, whether or not it was made by electronic or mechanical means", that "shows a person who is or is depicted as being under the age of eighteen years and is engaged in or is depicted as engaged in explicit sexual activity", or "the dominant characteristic of which is the depiction, for a sexual purpose, of a sexual organ or the anal region of a person under the age of eighteen years."

The current minimum penalty for possession of child pornography is six months of imprisonment, but it was struck down as unenforceable in R v Zhang (2018). Since its enactment in 1993, Section 163.1 has been amended in 2002, 2005, 2012, and 2015.

== Cases ==
=== Eli Langer art show trial ===
One early application of this law was the Eli Langer case. In 1993, this Toronto artist had an exhibition at the Mercer Gallery. His drawings included images of children in sexual positions. Police raided the gallery and confiscated the works. Langer was eventually acquitted after a trial because his work was considered artistic enough to be justified as protected speech.

=== R v Sharpe ===
The whole law against simple possession of child pornography was declared void for two years in British Columbia following a 1998 ruling (R v Sharpe) by the Supreme Court of British Columbia, but this decision was subsequently overturned by the Canadian Supreme Court. Moreover, the definitive 2001 Supreme Court ruling on the case interprets the child pornography statute to include purely fictional material even when no real children were involved in its production. Chief Justice Beverley McLachlin wrote,

Interpreting "person" in accordance with Parliament's purpose of criminalizing possession of material that poses a reasoned risk of harm to children, it seems that it should include visual works of the imagination as well as depictions of actual people. Notwithstanding the fact that 'person' in the charging section and in s. 163.1(1)(b) refers to a flesh-and-blood person, I conclude that "person" in s. 163.1(1)(a) includes both actual and imaginary human beings.

— Supreme Court of Canada, R v Sharpe, Paragraph 38

The court also carved out some exemptions to the law.

=== Gordon Chin trial ===
In October 2005, Canadian police arrested a 26-year-old Edmonton, Alberta man named Gordon Chin for importing Japanese manga depicting explicit hentai of child pornography. Chin's attorney claimed Chin did not know it was illegal, and that he was naive. Chin was sentenced by the judge to an eighteen-month conditional sentence, during which he was barred from using the Internet. This is the first-known manga-related child pornography case in Canada. It is also the first-known case that exclusively prosecutes this offense, not used in conjunction with other laws to increase sentencing.

== See also ==
- Legality of child pornography
  - Child pornography laws in the United States
  - Child pornography laws in Australia
  - Child pornography laws in the United Kingdom
  - Child pornography laws in Portugal
  - Child pornography laws in the Netherlands
  - Child pornography laws in Japan
