= Child pornography laws in Australia =

The Australian law prohibits all sexual depictions of children under an age set by state and territory legislation. The relevant ages are under 16 in the Australian Capital Territory, New South Wales, Queensland and Western Australia, under 17 in South Australia, and under 18 in the other jurisdictions and under federal law. The laws covering child pornography are differently defined in the various Australian jurisdictions, as are the penalties. The laws also cover depictions of sexual acts involving people over the threshold age who are simulating or otherwise alluding to being underage, even if all those involved are of a legal age. People have been successfully prosecuted after describing acts of abuse via MMS.

The maximum penalty for the possession, production, distribution, import, export, sale, or access over the internet of child pornography in Australia is 15 years. This was increased from 10 years in March 2010. A fine of up to A$275,000 may also come in place of, or in addition to, the prison sentence as well as sex offender registry requirements. Furthermore, most convictions in this respect are for possession of child pornography, which is typically dealt with under state legislation, and there have been only a few convictions for production and/or distribution of such material (under commonwealth legislation). Furthermore, there is a zero-tolerance policy in place, which covers real children as well as purely fictional children. Operation Auxin in September 2004 led to the arrest of almost 200 people on charges of child pornography, and "sting" operations are common.

== Anime and hentai ==
In August 2007, an Australian was sentenced to pay an A$9,000 fine for attempting to import eight DVDs of Japanese anime and hentai found to contain pornographic depictions of children and 14 found to contain depictions of sexual violence. No images of real children were involved. "Customs National Manager Investigations, Richard Janeczko, said that it was important to understand that even cartoons or drawings such as those depicted in anime were prohibited if they contained offensive sexual content."

In October 2020, Japanese goods importer J-List reported that it had cancelled all sales of adult goods to Australia following the rejection of packages by the Australian Border Force, and a recommendation from DHL. While J-List refer to this as the content being banned, another adult goods supplier, otonaJP, confirmed that they will continue shipping to Australia, including with DHL, and their situation has not changed.

== Other cartoon depictions ==
Also, in December 2008, a New South Wales Supreme Court judge, Justice Michael Adams, ruled to uphold a magistrate's decision that a pornographic cartoon parodying characters on The Simpsons (Bart and Lisa) was child pornography, because "[i]t follows that a fictional cartoon character, even one which departs from recognisable human forms in some significant respects, may nevertheless be the depiction of a person within the meaning of the Act."

The appellant, Alan John McEwan, was fined $3000 AUD ($3,170 USD). Judge Adams explained the law was appropriate because cartoons could "fuel demand for material that does involve the abuse of children", also adding "A cartoon character might well constitute the depiction of such a person". A BBC reporter summarized the judge's decision: "he decided that the mere fact that they were not realistic representations of human beings did not mean that they could not be considered people".

This case has attracted international attention, alongside attention to more local cases, with author Neil Gaiman commenting on it: "I suspect the Judge might have just inadvertently granted human rights to cartoon characters. I think it's nonsensical in every way that it could possibly be nonsensical."

== Cases concerning written work ==
In March 2011, a Tasmanian man was convicted of possessing child pornography after police investigators discovered an electronic copy of a nineteenth-century written work, The Pearl by Anonymous on his computer. HarperCollins is the most recent publisher of The Pearl, which is available for purchase within Australia. However the conviction was overturned on appeal.

In 2016, Nicolaas Bester was sentenced to four months in prison for social media posts in which he described his abuse of Grace Tame.

In March 2025, Lauren Tesolin-Mastrosa, writing as Tori Woods, was arrested in Sydney, New South Wales after she published a novel about a romance between an 18-year-old girl and her father's friend; the man had been fantasizing about the girl since she was three years old. NSW Police released a statement saying, "The woman was charged with possessing child abuse material, disseminating child abuse material, and producing child abuse material" after a search warrant and seizure of copies of the book.

== See also ==
- Pornography in Australia
- Child sexual abuse
- Legal status of drawn pornography depicting minors
- Laws regarding child pornography
  - Child pornography laws in the United States
  - Child pornography laws in Canada
  - Child pornography laws in the United Kingdom
  - Child pornography laws in the Netherlands
  - Child pornography laws in Portugal
  - Child pornography laws in Japan
  - Child pornography in the Philippines
- Murder of Carly Ryan - details related to "Carly's Law" and online grooming laws in Australia
