= Child pornography laws in Japan =

The production, sale, distribution, and commercialization of child pornography in Japan is illegal under the Act on Punishment of Activities Relating to Child Prostitution and Child Pornography, and the Protection of Children (1999), and is punishable by a maximum penalty of five years in prison and/or a fine of ¥5,000,000. Simple possession of child pornography was made illegal by an amendment to the act in 2014.

Virtual child pornography, which depicts wholly-fictional characters, is legal to produce and possess. Manga artists and anime directors have argued that it is dangerous to try to define child pornography when it comes to artwork, drawings, and animation when regarding hentai due to it being highly ambiguous, and have cited freedom of expression to prevent it from being abused. Artworks depicting underage characters (lolicon and shotacon) and photography of underage models (junior idol) remain controversial in Japan.

== Legal background ==
=== Domestic ===
The Act on Punishment of Activities Relating to Child Prostitution and Child Pornography, and the Protection of Children came into effect on May 26, 1999. Under Article 7, it outlawed the production, transport, import and export of child pornography, as well as possession of child pornography for the aforementioned purposes.

Previously, obscenity was regulated by the 1907 Penal Code of Japan. Article 175 of the code has been applied to underage obscenity, notably in a 1993 case where a burusera shop owner was arrested on suspicion of possession for sale of obscene media, after he had invited an under-18 high school student to appear in a pornographic video.

The penalty for possession with any intent of commercialization, sales, or distribution is a maximum imprisonment with labor for three years or a fine of three million yen (approximately $30,000). Production or distribution of child pornography is punishable by imprisonment with labor for up to five years and a fine of up to five million yen (approximately $50,000). Article 34 of the Child Welfare Act, applicable since 1947, states that "No person shall commit an act listed in any of the following items:" with line six specifying "Cause a child to commit an obscene act".

However, there were no laws addressing the simple possession of any kind of pornography in general (which included child pornography, with no intent to sale or distribute). On 4 June 2014, a bill was approved to be passed to ban the possession, closing this loophole in the nation's child pornography prohibition law, although it did not apply to hentai in anime and manga in order to prevent abuse of the law. Critics of the bill argued that its definition of child pornography was ambiguous when applied to hentai and could stifle freedom of expression. For example, they argued that in the anime and manga series Doraemon, a scene of the schoolgirl Shizuka Minamoto taking a bath might be construed as "child pornography". The bill nonetheless passed on 18 June 2014.

== Political background ==
In June 2008, a bill proposing a ban on child pornography possession was submitted to the House of Representatives of Japan, where it was brought before the Diet in September, but failed to pass. The Liberal Democratic Party and the New Komeito Party proposed to outlaw any possession of child pornography, but was countered by the Democratic Party of Japan with a different proposal. The House of Representatives dissolved on July 21, 2009, and both proposals to revise the law were withdrawn. During the general election of the House of Representatives in August 2009, open letters written by politicians to a civilian organization showed that the politicians were divided on the matter.

In 2008, the Japanese branch of UNICEF called on the government to outlaw simple possession of child pornography, as well as manga and anime pornography depicting minors. It also called for tighter restrictions of Junior idol media under existing laws. The United States ambassador to Japan has stated that Japan's lack of laws restricting possession of child pornography has impeded international investigations into child pornography.

On August 25, 2011, the Liberal Democratic Party submitted a petition requesting stricter laws on child pornography, which included child pornography in anime. In late June 2013, the Liberal Democratic Party moved forward with their proposal.

A 2007 public opinion poll taken by the Japanese government showed that 86.5% of respondents believed that child pornography regulations should be applied to anime and manga, while 90.9% endorsed regulations of "harmful materials" on the Internet.

== Junior idols ==
While not considered explicitly pornographic, media portraying young idols is a large industry in Japan. Photobooks and videos of underage models in scant, tight fitting and revealing clothing are often taken to be provocative and pornographic in nature. The industry remains lucrative, with The Japan Times reporting an estimated 3 million idol photobooks sold between 2006 and 2007.

While junior idol content currently stands on legally ambiguous ground due to open interpretations of child pornography laws, studios producing junior idol media are not exempt from current laws. After 2007, staff and heads of various video production firms were arrested on allegations that their productions overstepped legal boundaries. Multiple junior idol distributors closed after possession of child pornography was made illegal in Japan in 2014.

== Lolicon and shotacon ==
In Japan, lolicon is an attraction to visually underage girls by people of any age. It can also involve attraction to older characters with neotenic features that make them appear to be younger than they really are. Lolicon is a hentai subgenre in doujinshi, manga, anime, and video games in which childlike characters are usually depicted in an ero kawaii (erotic cute) manner, which can range from explicitly pornographic to mildly suggestive, romantic, or entirely non-sexual. The young boys equivalent is called shotacon. Outside Japan, lolicon only refers to the hentai subgenre, usually involving simulated pornography.

Figures regarding the prevalence of lolicon and shotacon are hard to come by, but it is estimated that 30–40% of manga contain sexual references involving underage characters. The age of consent in Japan was technically 13, but all prefectures choose 16 as the age of consent, however it was raised to 16 in 2023 with the adoption of a new sex crime law which also established grooming, voyeurism, and asking for sexual images of children under the age of 16 as crimes. No regulations are in place to control images portraying sexual content of hentai in manga or anime.

Supporters of regulating simulated pornography claim to advocate human rights and children's rights such as the Convention on the Rights of the Child. Opponents such as the Japan Federation of Bar Associations (ja:日本弁護士連合会) also claim to advocate for the rights of children, pointing out the decreasing numbers in sexually motivated crimes are due to simulated materials providing an outlet to those who would otherwise seek material depicting actual children.

The constitutionality of proposed laws have been discussed, since Article 21 of the Constitution of Japan guarantees freedom of speech, press and all other forms of expression. The definitions of obscenity, specifically written in law as "arouses or stimulates the viewer's sexual desire", have been argued as ambiguous.

== See also ==
- Legal status of fictional pornography depicting minors
- Laws regarding child pornography
  - Child pornography laws in Australia
  - Child pornography laws in the United States
  - Child pornography laws in Canada
  - Child pornography laws in the United Kingdom
  - Child pornography laws in the Netherlands
  - Child pornography laws in Portugal
  - Child pornography in the Philippines
