= Dost test =

United States court guideline

The Dost test is a six-factor guideline established in 1986 in the United States district court case United States v. Dost, 636 F. Supp. 828 (S.D.Cal. 1986). The case involved 22 nude or semi-nude photographs of females aged 10–14 years old. The undeveloped film containing the images was mailed to a photo processing company in Hollywood, Los Angeles, California.

== Criteria ==
In order to better determine whether a visual depiction of a minor constitutes a "lascivious exhibition of the genitals or pubic area" under 18 U.S.C. § 2256(2)(B), the court developed six criteria. Not all of the criteria need to be met, nor are other criteria necessarily excluded in this test. For example, in United States v. Johnson, three Dost factors (sexually suggestive setting, inappropriate attire or unnatural poses, and a suggestion of sexual coyness) were absent from the videos taken by the defendant, but the Eighth Circuit ruled that a reasonable jury could still find that he had acted lasciviously.

1. Whether the focal point of the visual depiction is on the child's genitalia or pubic area.
2. Whether the setting of the visual depiction is sexually suggestive, i.e., in a place or pose generally associated with sexual activity.
3. Whether the child is depicted in an unnatural pose, or in inappropriate attire, considering the age of the child.
4. Whether the child is fully or partially clothed, or nude.
5. Whether the visual depiction suggests sexual coyness or a willingness to engage in sexual activity.
6. Whether the visual depiction is intended or designed to elicit a sexual response in the viewer.

== Case law ==
Concerning the lascivious display of clothed genitalia, the U.S. Department of Justice described use of the Dost test in child pornography and 2257 documentation regulations in a 2008 rule, writing that the precedent United States v. Knox, 32 F.3d 733 (3d Cir. 1994) did not prohibit ordinary swim team or underwear model photographs, but "although the genitals were clothed in that case, they were covered by thin, opaque clothing with an obvious purpose to draw attention to them, were displayed by models who spread or extended their legs to make the pubic and genital region entirely visible to the viewer, and were displayed by models who danced or gyrated in a way indicative of adult sexual relations".

The Fifth Circuit of the United States departed from Dost with respect to the intent of the Defendant, concluding well that a given photo may constitute child pornography even if the photographer clearly had only asexual intent, and that likewise a photo of a child in a winter coat was not child pornography, even if a pedophile was sexually stimulated by the latter.

"Lascivious" can describe a multitude of elements including the child's partial or complete nudity or the focus of the image (as held in United States v. Kemmerling), the child's act (as held in Ferber), the filmmaker's intent, or the viewer's reaction (as held in Knox). In United States v. Horn, the Eighth Circuit held that even if the child is acting innocently, the images can be lascivious if they are intended to be sexual. In that case, videos had been taken of nude girls "freeze-framed at moments when their pubic areas are most exposed, as, for instance, when they are doing cartwheels; and these areas are at the center of the image and form the focus of the depiction." In Johnson, the court noted that "statements made by the producer about the images are relevant in determining whether the images were intended to elicit a sexual response in the viewer."

== Relation to other elements of US child pornography law ==
Miller v. California sets the precedent as to what may constitute illegal obscenity generally under US law. Dost only focused on the prong of the Miller test that deals specifically with appealing to the prurient interest. The other two prongs of the Miller test are whether or not the material violates contemporary community standards and whether or not the material in question has serious artistic, literary, or political value.

However, because obscenity and child pornography are two distinct categories of speech, and child pornography is not required to be obscene, any relation to the Miller standard as applied to virtual/fictional child pornography is immaterial, as explained by Ashcroft v. Free Speech Coalition and United States v. Williams (2008).

On appeal of a court's determination that a depiction is lascivious, a de novo review is required, due to the First Amendment rights implicated.

== Criticism ==
The test was criticized by NYU Law professor Amy Adler as forcing members of the public to look at pictures of children as a pedophile would in order to determine whether they are considered inappropriate. "As everything becomes child pornography in the eyes of the law—clothed children, coy children, children in settings where children are found—perhaps children themselves become pornographic".

Robert J. Danay notes, "The application of these factors, as in Knox, necessitates a drawn out analysis of materials that most people would not, in the past, have considered obscene or even sexual in nature. Through such analyses, police, judges, lawyers, and, ultimately, members of the public are forced to closely inspect increasingly innocuous images of children (and children generally) to determine whether the depicted children might be acting in a sexual manner."

== See also ==
- Child erotica
- Child pornography laws
- Child pornography laws in the United States
- COPINE scale
- Legal status of drawn pornography depicting minors
- Obscenity
- Stanley v. Georgia, 394 U.S. 557 (1969)
- New York v. Ferber, 458 U.S. 747 (1982)
- Osborne v. Ohio, 495 U.S. 103 (1990)
