= Age of consent in Mexico =

Minimum age of consent in Mexico by state. 12 14 15 18 Stripes: Jalisco allows 15 if seduction refuted. State of Mexico allows 13 if the difference in age is less than 5 years

Each Mexican state sets the minimum age of consent for sex outside marriage by statute. These vary between 12 and 15. The federal government sets an age of 18, and there are statutory rape (estupro) laws that prohibit deception and often seduction in order to have sex with a minor over the minimum age of consent. For example, Sinaloa sets the minimum age at 12, but presumes that any sex between an adult and a minor under 16 is statutory rape; sex with a minor over 16 is also prosecutable, though usually only at the request of the minor or their legal guardians.

== Legislative framework ==
In Mexico, criminal legislation is shared between the federal and state governments. The federal law establishes the age of 15 as the minimum age of consent, while the age at which there are no restrictions for consensual sexual activities is 18 (sex with someone 15–17 is not illegal per se, but can still be open to prosecution under certain circumstances). Local state laws may override the federal law. In practice, the decision as to whether or not to prosecute is left to state authorities regardless of the younger person's age. At state level, the minimum ages of consent vary between 12 and 15, while the age at which there are no restrictions for consensual sexual activities is 18.

== Estupro laws ==
Estupro, or statutory rape, is a crime in all states. Although the definitions vary by state, it is usually defined as sexual conduct with a child who has reached the minimum age of consent but is under 18 when the consent of the child is obtained by deceit or seduction. For instance the law of Aguascalientes formerly read: "El estupro consiste en realizar cópula con persona mayor de doce y menor de dieciséis años de edad, obteniendo su consentimiento por medio de seducción o engaño." (translation: Statutory rape consists in copulating with a person over twelve and under sixteen years old, obtaining his/her consent through seduction or deceit). Traditionally, estupro applied only to acts committed with a girl, and required "chastity" or "honesty" of the girl. The vast majority of Mexican states have modernized their laws by removing the requirement of "chastity" or "honesty" and by making the laws gender-neutral. However, traditional laws still exist in some states: for instance, the law of Baja California reads: Al que realice cópula con mujer de catorce años de edad y menor de dieciocho, casta y honesta, obteniendo su consentimiento por medio de la seducción o el engaño (translation: "Whoever copulates with a chaste and honest female over fourteen and under eighteen years old, obtaining her consent through seduction or deceit"). All states but Baja California have removed the requirement of "chastity" or "honesty" and the definition of estupro as applicable only to girls. The exact type of coercion that must be used varies by state, for example the Federal Law only makes reference to "deceit", omitting "seduction" (it reads: Al que tenga cópula con persona mayor de quince años y menor de dieciocho, obteniendo su consentimiento por medio de engaño, translation: "Whoever copulates with a person over fifteen and under eighteen years old, obtaining his/her consent through deceit").

== Federal law ==
Article 261 of the Federal Criminal Code (PDF) states that: Anyone who commits the crime of sexual abuse of a person under 18 years of age or of a person who lacks the capacity to understand the meaning of the act, even with their consent, or who for any reason cannot resist it or is forced to commit it on themselves or another person, shall be sentenced to 6 to 13 years in prison. (The age cutoff was raised from 12 to 15 in 2012, and again from 15 to 18 in 2023.) The penalty is further increased if violence is used. The term "crime of sexual abuse" is defined broadly by Article 260 and includes, among other things, "obscene touching" and forcing to observe sexual acts.

Article 262 reads, Whoever has intercourse with a person over fifteen years of age and under eighteen, obtaining their consent by means of deception, will be sentenced to three months to four years in prison. This crime of estupro, however, is prosecuted only through a complaint of the minor or his/her parents or legal guardians, as determined in Article 263.

Article 266 refers to the previous article 265, which covers the rape of adults in general and establishes a term of 8 to 14 years in prison for sex obtained through physical or moral violence. Article 266 then states that: "It is equivalent to rape and will be punished with the same penalty: (1st Clause) – who without violence performs a copulation with a person under 15". The 3rd Clause of this article punishes with the same penalties also "the vaginal or anal introduction of objects, without violence and with lascivious goals, in a person under 18 or in a person that has no capacity of understanding the meaning of the fact, or for any reason cannot resist." This same article also states "If any of the aforementioned acts is performed with physical or moral violence, the sentence is raised in up to a half."

A further article, 266 Bis, determines an extra penalty of up to a half under certain circumstances – (a) when there are multiple offenders; (b) when the offense is committed by a parent, legal guardian, stepfather or "companion" (amasio) of the mother; (c) when there is an abuse of authority of someone as a civil servant; (d) when the crime is committed by a person who has the minor under their custody, guard or education, or yet through the abuse of trust.

Article 201 prohibits the "corruption" of a minor under 16.

== State laws ==
Updated between 2023 and 2024.

| State | Minimum age of consent (sex with persons under this age is always illegal) | Age at which there are no restrictions (sex with persons below this age is not illegal per se, but it is still open to prosecution) | "Violación equiparada" | "Estupro" |
|---|---|---|---|---|
| Aguascalientes | 15 | 18 | 118 | 118 |
| Baja California | 14 | 18 | 177 | 182 |
| Baja California Sur | 15 | 18 | 286 | 290 |
| Campeche | 18 (statutory rape if over 14 and with consent, simple rape otherwise) | 18 | 162 | 164 |
| Chiapas | 14 | 18 | 235 | 239 |
| Chihuahua | 14 | 18 | 172 | 177 |
| Coahuila | 15 | 18 | 229 | 235 |
| Colima | 14 | 18 | 146 | 148 |
| Durango | 14 | 18 | 177 | 181 |
| Guanajuato | 14 | 18 | 181 | 185 |
| Guerrero | 15 | 18 | 179 | 187 |
| Hidalgo | 15 | 18 | 180 | 185 |
| Jalisco | 18 (15 if seduction is refuted) | 18 | 142-L, 142-M | 142-L, 142-M |
| México | 15; 13 if age difference is < 5 yrs | 18 | 273 | 271 |
| Mexico City | 15 | 18 | 261-263 | 261-263 |
| Michoacán | 12 | 18 | 240 | 170 |
| Morelos | 12 | 18 | 154 | 159 |
| Nayarit | 15(upon request of child/guardians; deceit presumed) | 18 | 295 | 291-292 |
| Nuevo León | 15 | 18 | 267 | 262 |
| Oaxaca | 18 | 18 | 241 | 243 |
| Puebla | 14 (estupro presumed if age difference is greater than 3 yrs) | 18 | 272 | 264, 265 |
| Querétaro | 14 | 18 | 161 | 167 |
| Quintana Roo | 14 | 18 | 127 | 130 |
| San Luis Potosí | 14 | 18 | 173 | 179 |
| Sinaloa | 12 (deceit presumed if under 16) | 18 | 180 | 184 |
| Sonora | 12 | 18 | 219 | 215 |
| Tabasco | 14 | 18 | 153 | 153 |
| Tamaulipas | 15 | 18 | 270 | 270 |
| Tlaxcala | 14 | 18 | 289 | 291 |
| Veracruz | 14 | 18 | 189 | 186 |
| Yucatán | 15 | 18 | 315 | 311 |
| Zacatecas | 15 | 18 | 237.1 | 237.4 |

All Mexican states (as well as Mexico City) have corruption of minors statutes that can, upon complaint of the family (or minor), be used to punish sexual relations with persons under eighteen. Although actual prosecutions for violations of Corruption of Minors statutes (and age of consent statutes in general) tend to be sporadic, regional, and very situation dependent, many Mexican states nonetheless classify Corruption of Minors as a "Delito Grave" (Major Crime) in their penal codes.

Additionally, all states have statutory-rape laws that can, upon complaint of the family (or minor), be used to prosecute adults who engage in sexual intercourse with minors by seduction or deceit (the exact definitions of this crime vary by state, see section estupro, above).

In some Mexican jurisdictions, prosecutors have chosen to prosecute consensual sexual activity involving adults and underage minors only upon complaint by the minor, or a custodial complaint.

=== Mexico City ===
The age of consent in Mexico City is 15, and the overall criminal legislation of Mexico's capital is close to that of the federal law regarding this subject, although tougher in some aspects – higher penalties and broader definitions.

According to the Estatuto del Gobierno del Distrito Federal (PDF)(in Spanish) (Government Statute of the Federal District), Article 42, Clause XII, the District's Legislative Assembly has powers to legislate in criminal law.

Article 175 of the Federal District Criminal Code refers to the previous Article 174, which stipulates a term of 6 to 17 years of prison for the rape of adults, while defining copulation as "the introduction of the penis in the human body through the vagina, anus or mouth". Article 175 (violación) then states that: "It is equivalent to rape and will be punished with the same penalty:" (first clause) – "who performs a copulation with a person under 12 years of age or with a person that has no capacity of understanding the meaning of the act or that for any reason cannot resist"; the second clause defines whosoever "introduces in the vagina or anus any element, instrument or any part of the human body different from the penis" as having committed the same crime, in relation to these same persons.

Article 177 covers "sexual abuse" and punishes other acts referred as "unintentional" acts –"who without purpose of reaching copulation, performs a sexual act with a person under 12 or a person that has no capacity of understanding the meaning of the act or that for any reason cannot resist it, or that demands that such act is observed or performed, will be punished with 2 to 7 years in prison".

In both Articles (175 and 177), there is an extra half term in case of physical or moral violence. And according to Article 178, there is also a punishment of an extra two thirds of the term under the same circumstances foreseen in Article 266 Bis of the Federal Law (see above), added by two new circumstances – (clause V) when the victim is inside a private vehicle or a public service vehicle; and (clause VI) when the crime is committed in a desert or isolated place.

There is a crime called estupro stipulated in Article 180, which refers to consented sex with adolescents aged 12 to 18, when consent is obtained through any means of deceit. The penalty is 6 months to 4 years of prison. This crime needs a complaint (querella) to be prosecuted.

There is a Corruption of Minors statute (Article 184) that can be used to punish by imprisonment, for seven to twelve years, adults who engage in sexual relations with persons under eighteen. This situation exists all over Mexico, and can be prosecuted upon complaint of victim or the victim's family.
