= Child pornography laws in the Netherlands =

In the Netherlands, child pornography is illegal, making it one of the 103 out of 193 UN member states where it is illegal.

== Dutch law referring to child pornography ==
According to the Wetboek van Strafrecht:

- Article 252 prohibits the production, distribution, possession and sale of child pornography, and gaining access to it by means of the Internet. Maximum imprisonment is 6 years or a fine of the fifth category (€ 82,000).
- Article 254 prohibits committing crime, described under number 1 as a profession or as a habit, increasing the base sentence of 6 years by another 3 years.

In the Netherlands, the definition of child pornography is "a visual display of a sexual nature, or with an unmistakable sexual scope in which a person who seemingly has not yet reached the age of eighteen years old.

== Chick-arrest ==
In 1970, the publication of sex magazine Chick resulted in the Dutch "Chick-arrest" by the Supreme Court of the Netherlands, which in turn led to the new Dutch moral law of 1971 that no longer criminally sanctioned pornography. As a result, child pornography also became effectively legal and Joop Wilhelmus started publishing child pornography magazine Lolita.

== 1984 police raids ==
In 1984, a major police raid against child pornography occurred in the Netherlands. During the late 1970s, there had been media reports about the illicit trade, but there were few if any criminal investigations on the topic.

== 2002 legislation ==
On October 1, 2002, the Netherlands introduced legislation (Bulletin of Acts and Decrees 470) which deemed "virtual child pornography" as illegal. An attempt to test the law came in 2007, when the public prosecutor opened investigations into Second Life (the US based virtual world). A number of Second Life users engage in sexual ageplay where their online avatars dress, act and look like underage children while engaging in virtual sexual acts. Although there is no Dutch law that legislates against under age depictions of sexual acts for computer generated images, the public prosecutor is investigating this on the basis that these virtual actions may incite child abuse in the real world. So far this has not led to any successful prosecutions.

== Significant rise in illegal websites ==
Press reports in 2008 described a large rise in the number of child pornography websites hosted in the Netherlands, increasing from 100 reports of sites in 2006 to 700 in 2007.

In 2020, the European Commission reported that in 2019, the Netherlands hosted 71% of the child porn detected in Europe by the Internet Watch Foundation, an increase from 47% in 2018.

== See also ==
- Laws regarding child pornography
  - Child pornography laws in Portugal
  - Child pornography laws in the United Kingdom
  - Child pornography laws in Australia
  - Child pornography laws in Canada
  - Child pornography laws in the United States
  - Child pornography laws in Japan
