= Pornography in Australia =

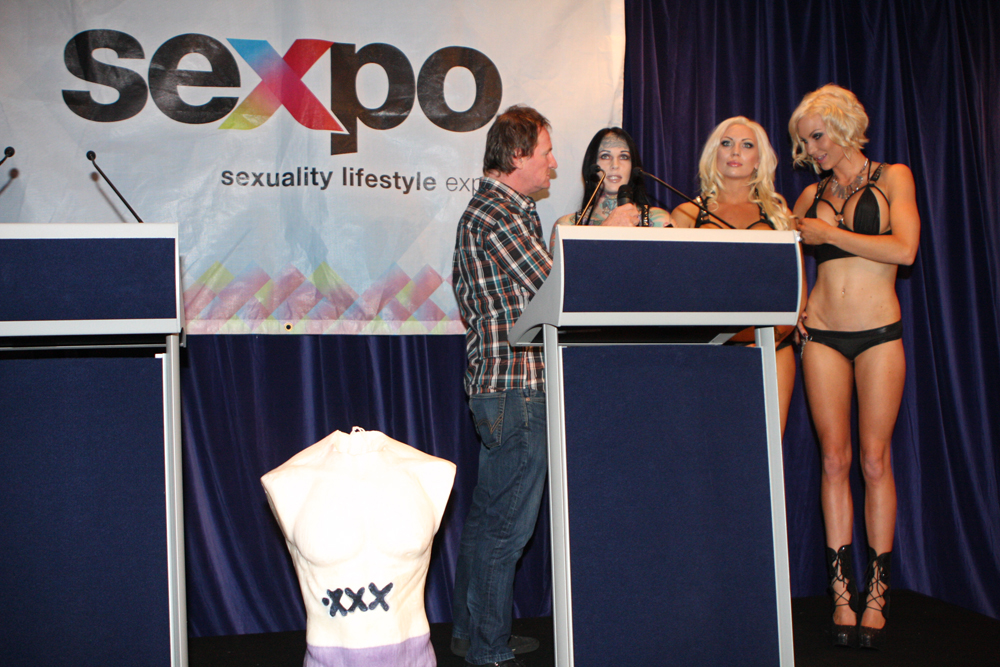
The Sexpo festival, 2012

While pornography is legal in Australia, compared to other Western countries, Australia has historically had restrictive laws. Prior to the invention of internet pornography, pornographic films were de facto illegal in all six states, with pornography only being legal in the territories. Child Sexual Abuse Material and pornographic depictions of animals are illegal in Australia. Some other forms of pornography, such as BDSM pornography, are also technically illegal in Australia, but are widely available online.

In Australia, it is legal to possess pornographic material, with some extreme exceptions. However, it is illegal to sell, exhibit or rent X-rated pornographic material in all states (Victoria, South Australia, Western Australia, New South Wales, Tasmania, and Queensland). Still, it is legal to do so in the two territories (the Northern Territory and the Australian Capital Territory). As the Australian constitution prohibits states from regulating interstate commerce, it is permitted to purchase pornography in either territory and then bring it interstate. As a result, the majority of Australian mail-order operations for adult material operate from the ACT.

== History ==
In 1970, the earliest explicit adult film was produced in Australia. It was a hardcore lesbian film titled The Dream.

In 1983, Labor Attorney General Gareth Evans oversaw video regulation by devising a compulsory classification scheme. The following year an ordinance was passed that included a new X classification that was to apply to the sale of videos in the Commonwealth Territories.

In 2007, the Northern Territory National Emergency Response, introduced by the Howard government, made the possession of alcohol or material classified as X18+ or RC (the former being the classification given to all legal forms of pornography, while the latter being the classification given to anything banned in Australia) a criminal offence in some remote Aboriginal communities in the Northern Territory, including in the Alice Springs town camps.

In 2020, a government inquiry into age verification for online wagering and online pornography found that implementing age verification measures was recommended. In 2023, the eSafety Commissioner submitted a roadmap on age verification to the Australian Government for consideration.

== Viewing ==
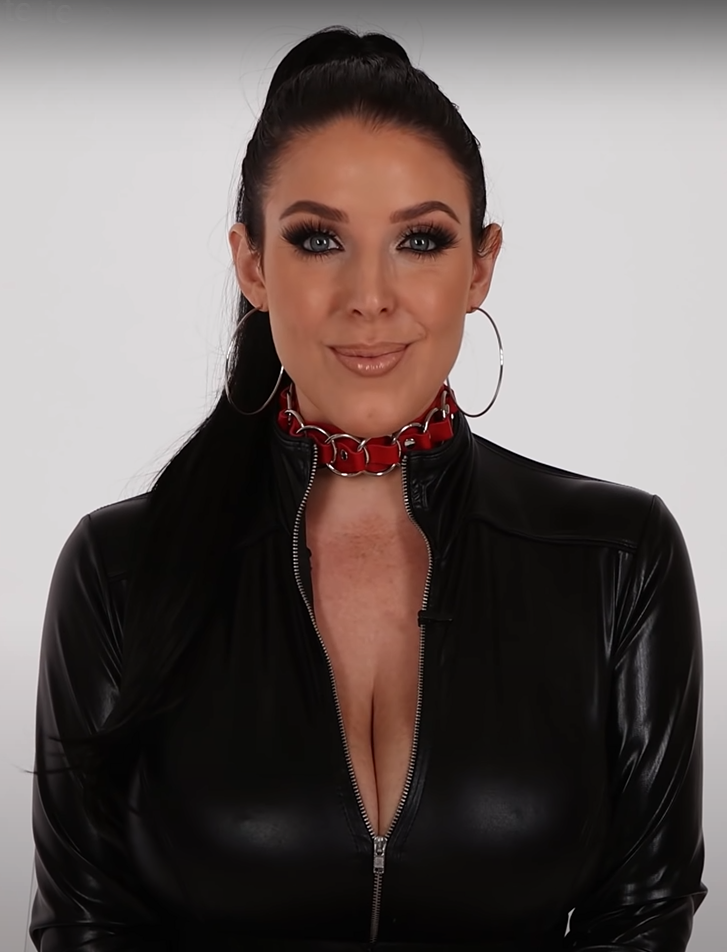
Australian porn star Angela White, 2001

A 2019 analysis of Australians pornography viewing habits found that found the majority of Australians use their mobile phone to watch online pornography.

The average age Australians first encounter online pornography is 13. About one in three young Australians view pornography for sex education. A 2024 Queensland University of Technology study found that the majority of young people aged 15–20 years old had been exposed to pornography, intentionally or accidentally. It found that 54.4 per cent of young men viewed pornography at least weekly.

== Regulation ==
There are three types of classification by which video adult content may be distinguished for legal reasons. These are R18+ Restricted for simulated sexual activity and nudity in a sexual context, X R18+ Restricted for X Rated content such as hardcore pornography and RC Refused Classification.

Online pornography is regulated by the eSafety Commissioner, Julie Inman Grant.

=== Illegal pornography ===
Some types of pornography (both real and fictitious) are technically illegal in Australia and if classified would be rated RC and therefore banned in Australia. This includes any pornography depicting violent BDSM, incest, paedophilia, zoophilia, certain extreme fetishes (such as golden showers) and/or indicators of youth (such as wearing a school uniform). However, all of these other than paedophilic and zoophilic pornography are widely available on pornographic websites, which are accessed by millions of Australians.

Fictitious child pornography is illegal and falls under the same category as real child pornography. In December 2008, a man from Sydney was convicted of possessing child pornography after it was found that he had sexually explicit images of Bart, Lisa and Maggie Simpson, three fictional characters from the American animated sitcom The Simpsons who are minors, on his computer. The New South Wales Supreme Court upheld a Local Court decision that the characters "depicted, and thus could be considered, real people".

== Pornographic film industry ==
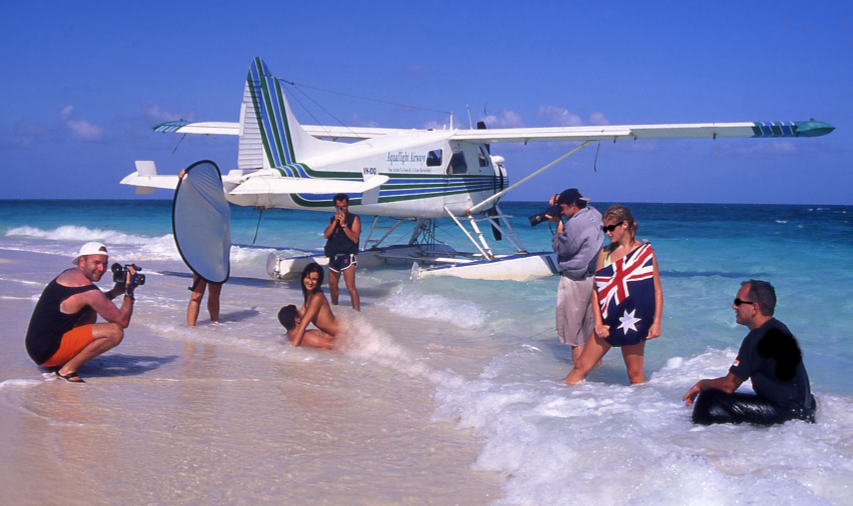
Pierre Woodman filming pornography in Australia, 1997

It is generally legal in Australia to film pornography. The acts must be consensual and violence-free.

The Australian pornographic film industry has traditionally been concentrated in the country's capital city, Canberra, which is regarded as Australia's most progressive city. Prior to the invention of the internet, Canberra was the only place where pornography could legally be sold. Canberra's pornographic film industry is part of the city's broader sex industry, which is the largest and oldest legal sex industry in Australia. Even today, Canberra is still regarded as Australia's "sex capital".

== See also ==
- Censorship in Australia
- Child pornography laws in Australia
