= R v Sharpe =

2001 Supreme Court of Canada case

- Supreme Court of Canada

Hearing: January 18, 19 2000 Judgment: January 26, 2001
- Full case name: Her Majesty The Queen v John Robin Sharpe
- Citations: 2001 SCC 2, [2001] 1 SCR 45
- Ruling: Appeal allowed, charges remitted to trial

Court membership
- Chief Justice: Beverley McLachlin; Puisne Justices: Claire L'Heureux-Dubé, Charles Gonthier, Frank Iacobucci, John C. Major, Michel Bastarache, Ian Binnie, Louise Arbour, Louis LeBel

Reasons given
- Majority: McLachlin (paras 1–130), joined by Iacobucci, Major, Binnie, Arbour, and LeBel
- Concurrence: L'Heureux-Dubé, Gonthier, and Bastarache (paras 131–243)

R v Sharpe [2001] 1 S.C.R. 45, 2001 SCC 2 is a constitutional rights decision of the Supreme Court of Canada. The court balanced the societal interest to regulate child pornography against the right to freedom of expression possessed by the defendants under section 2 of the Canadian Charter of Rights and Freedoms; holding, that while general prohibition of child pornography was constitutional, there were some limits imposed by the Charter. The decision overturned a ruling by the British Columbia Court of Appeal.

== Background ==
After police seized 517 photographs mostly of young boys, as well as sexually explicit stories; John Robin Sharpe was charged on two counts of possession of child pornography, and on another two counts of possession with intent to distribute. Sharpe argued that the relevant provision of the criminal code placed an unreasonable limitation on his freedom of expression, and in a ruling the British Columbia Court of Appeal concurred; Justice Duncan Shaw ruled that the law was a "profound invasion" of the freedom of expression and right to privacy found in the Charter. Before its eventual reexamination by the Supreme Court, the decision invited protest, with more than half of the Members of Parliament petitioning the Prime Minister to intervene.

== Holding ==
In its ruling the Supreme Court emphasized the interest of the government to prevent the proliferation of child pornography and upheld its prohibition (reversing the decision to strike down the statute at-large), while also recognizing the importance of "adolescent self-fulfillment, self-actualization and sexual exploration and identity." -(Paragraph 109) and that also commentated "To ban the possession of our own private musings thus falls perilously close to criminalizing the mere articulation of thought. " -(Paragraph 108).

Ultimately the court carved out two exceptions to the power, and law:

"1. Self-created expressive material: i.e., any written material or visual representation created by the accused alone, and held by the accused alone, exclusively for his or her own personal use; and

2. Private recordings of lawful sexual activity: i.e., any visual recording, created by or depicting the accused, provided it does not depict unlawful sexual activity and is held by the accused exclusively for private use." -(Paragraph 115).

== Aftermath ==
Ultimately, after the case was remitted, Sharpe received a four-month conditional house arrest sentence, in issuing the sentence Shaw noted "In the eyes of many he has become a pariah, endured six years of this court case and has no criminal record".

== See also ==
- List of Supreme Court of Canada cases (McLachlin Court)
