= Mercer Union =

Artist-run centre in downtown Toronto, Ontario

- Established: 1979; 47 years ago
- Location: Toronto, Ontario, Canada
- Coordinates: 43°39′31″N 79°26′31″W
- Type: Contemporary Art
- Director: Theresa Wang
- Public transit access: Lansdowne station
- Website: www.mercerunion.org

Mercer Union is a Canadian artist-run centre in Toronto, Ontario, established in 1979 to exhibit contemporary art.

== History ==
Mercer Union was founded in 1979 by artists Michael Balfe, Peter Blendell, Ric Evans, Peter Hill, Jamie Lyons, David MacWilliam, John McKinnon, Robert McNealy, Jaan Poldaas, Renee Van Halm, Joy Walker and Robert Wiens. The gallery's original location was at 29 Mercer Street (from which the name Mercer Union was derived). It later moved to 439 King Street West, 333 Adelaide St. West, and 37 Lisgar Street. In 2008, the gallery moved to the Bloor and Lansdowne area in Toronto's west end.

In 2007, Mercer Union exhibited work by Canadian artist Michel de Broin. The artist's "Shared Propulsion Car," an old Buick stripped of its engine and interior, and then outfitted with a four-seat bicycle pedal and brake system, was confiscated by Toronto police after gallery staff took it for a ride on Queen Street West. The driver was ticketed for operating an unsafe vehicle; however, the charges were dismissed after a court appearance. De Broin characterized the dismissal as a victory for "the right to go slow.". The same artist's car was driven in New York City without controversy.

== Censorship controversy ==
In 1993, Mercer Union was involved in a case of censorship. The gallery was raided by the Morality Bureau of the Metropolitan Toronto Police in December 1993, and works by Canadian artist Eli Langer were seized. Although Langer and the gallery’s director were initially charged with violating the child pornography provisions of the Criminal Code, those charges were withdrawn by the Crown which chose to prosecute the paintings instead. The hearing – the first to occur under Canada’s controversial child pornography legislation – examined the question of whether Langer’s depictions of nude children and adults were illegal and should be forfeited, as well as the constitutionality of the law. The artworks were later ruled legal.
