= Gazeta Olsztyńska =

Polish daily newspaper

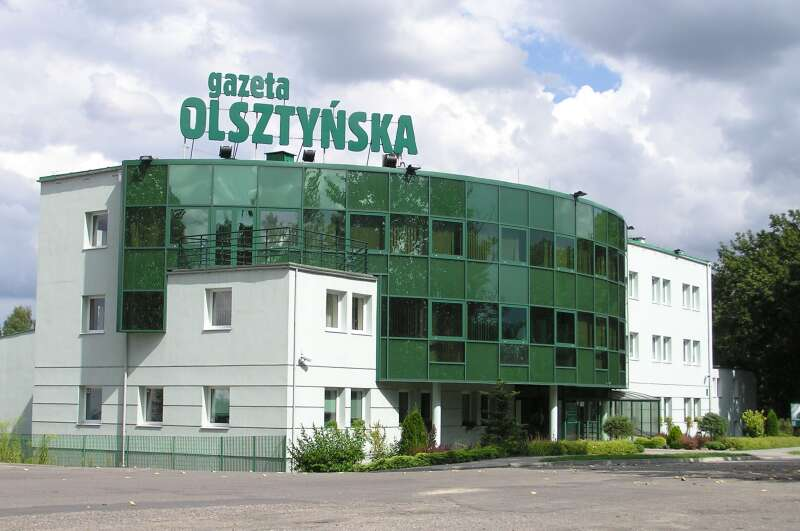
- Current office of Gazeta Olsztyńska
- Founded: 1886; 140 years ago
- Language: Polish
- Headquarters: Olsztyn, Poland

Gazeta Olsztyńska (English: Olsztyn Daily) is a Polish language newspaper published in Olsztyn.

== History ==
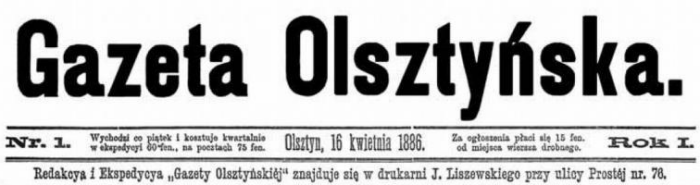
Headline of the first issue from 1886

The newspaper was first published in the years 1886–1939. Its first editor in chief was an ethnic Warmiak Jan Liszewski, after him the paper was taken over by the Pieniezny family.

Since January 1, 1921 Gazeta Olsztyńska has been published six times a week, together with regular extras, such as the Sunday Guest, Farmer, Life of the Youth, and Voice of the Borderland. Especially popular was a column written in the local dialect of the Polish language. The column, titled "Kuba from Wartembork Says", was authored by Seweryn Pieniężny.

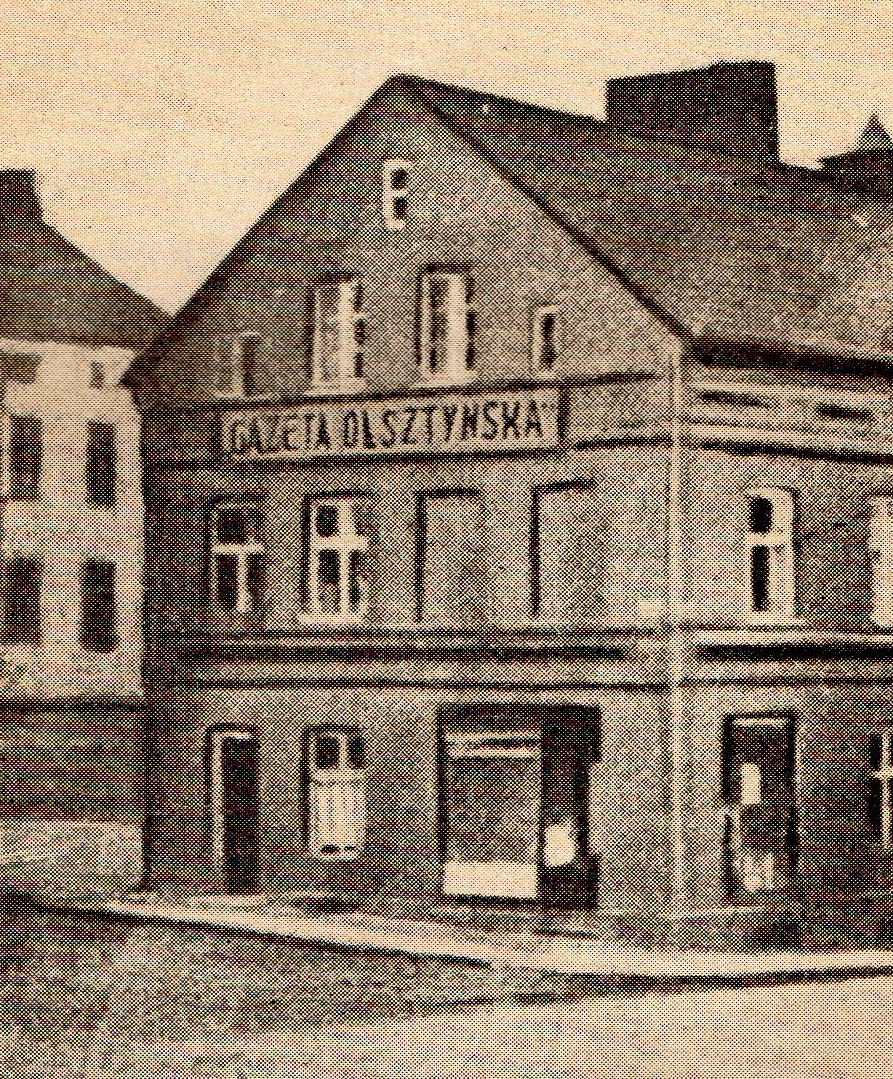
Pre-WW2 headquarters

Gazeta Olsztyńska's publishing house issued other papers, such as Gazeta Polska for the Vistula counties, Evangelical Voice, and Teacher's Guide. In the interbellum period, the Pieniezny family printing shop printed some 47 books and brochures.

The newspaper in its current name was first issued on 6 April 1975 as a successor to Głos Olsztyński. In that year the average annual circulation of Gazeta Olsztyńska was 117,094. During the strike at the Olsztyńskie Zakłady Graficzne (the printing house of Gazeta Olsztyńska), in August 1981, the newspaper was printed at the Provincial Committee of the Polish United Workers' Party on a small-format duplicator, then at the Higher School of Milicja Obywatelska in Szczytno and the military printing house in Łódź. After martial law was declared in Poland on 13 December 1981, only Trybuna Ludu (the organ of the Polish United Workers' Party), Żołnierz Wolności (the newspaper of the Polish People's Army) and several regional dailies were published, among which was also Gazeta Olsztyńska, which was then considered the press organ of the Provincial Committee of the Polish United Workers' Party in Olsztyn. The year 1986 was celebrated as the hundredth anniversary of the publication of the first issue of Gazeta Olsztyńska, thus appropriating the tradition of Gazeta Pieniężnych. At that time, Gazeta Olsztyńska was also decorated with the Knight's Cross of the Order of Polonia Restituta.

After 1989 and the political changes in Poland, Gazeta Olsztyńska remained the official organ of the Polish United Workers' Party, but the slogan about proletarians ("Proletarians of all countries unite!") was removed from the masthead, replacing it with the Fourth Truth of the Union of Poles in Germany from 1938: "Every day a Pole serves the Nation". When the act on the liquidation of the RSW concern came into force in 1990, a special liquidation commission was established. Since 1 January 1999, Gazeta Olsztyńska has been published in the entire Warmian-Masurian Voivodeship, except for the rural districts of Elbląg and Braniewo and the city of Elbląg.

The newspaper gained international attention when a photoshopped version of Pedobear, an internet meme originating from the controversial website 4chan, appeared along with 2010 Winter Olympic and Paralympic Games mascots in an article on the games in Gazeta Olsztyńska.
