= Jailbait =

Slang term used for a young person

Jailbait is slang for a person who is younger than the legal age of consent for sexual activity and usually appears older, with the implication that a person above the age of consent might find them sexually attractive. The term jailbait is derived from the fact that engaging in sexual activity with someone who is under the age of consent is classified as statutory rape or by an equivalent term, and is generally punished with imprisonment.

== Criteria ==
As the legal age of consent varies by country and jurisdiction, the age at which a person can be considered "jailbait" varies. For example, in the United Kingdom, where the age of consent is 16, the term is used to refer to those younger than 16, whereas in some parts of the United States, where the age of consent is 18, the term would refer to those aged under 18. The frequent use of the term jailbait in popular culture has been linked to a greater understanding of age of consent laws among teenagers.

== See also ==
- Ephebophilia
- Jailbait images
