= Child pornography laws in the United Kingdom =

Child pornography laws in England and Wales are covered by the Protection of Children Act 1978 ("the 1978 Act"), which made it illegal to take, make, distribute, show, or possess for the intent of showing or distributing an indecent photograph of someone under the age of 18. The maximum penalty is 10 years in prison. In the context of digital media, saving an indecent image to a computer's hard drive is considered to be "making" the image, as it causes a copy to exist which did not exist before. Indecency is to be interpreted by a jury, who should apply the recognised standards of propriety.

The prohibition of content on the Internet that is potentially illegal under this law by British internet service providers is however self-regulatory, coordinated by the non-profit charity Internet Watch Foundation.

The 1978 Act was extended in 1994 (by the Criminal Justice and Public Order Act 1994), to cover "pseudo-photographs" – images that appear to be photographs.

The Sexual Offences Act 2003 amended the general age of subjects under the act from 16 to 18 (although added in exemptions in law for which images of a person above the age of consent (16) were to remain lawful, provided that the images in question were kept private and between two parties in a legal relationship).

In 2008, the Act was further extended (by the Criminal Justice and Immigration Act 2008) to cover tracings, and other works derived from photographs or pseudo-photographs. In 2009, cartoon sexual images depicting minors, not just those that were derived from photographs or pseudo-photographs, were criminalised by the Coroners and Justice Act 2009, under which any possession of images also became a criminal offence (whereas before it was legal to possess hard copies of images so long as there was no intention to show or distribute them to others).

Similar legal provisions exist in Scotland and Northern Ireland but the 1978 Act does not extend to there.

== See also ==
- Legality of child pornography
  - Child pornography laws in the Netherlands
  - Child pornography laws in Portugal
  - Child pornography laws in the United States
  - Child pornography laws in Australia
  - Child pornography laws in Canada
  - Child pornography laws in Japan
- Child Exploitation and Online Protection Command (CEOP)
