= Child pornography laws in Portugal =

Child pornography laws in Portugal state that such pornography is statutorily criminalised in the Portuguese Criminal Code.

== Age of consent ==
The age of sexual consent in Portugal is, in principle, 14 years of age. The participation of underage persons in pornographic scenes is subject to stricter standards, however, because they are subject to the general regime of adulthood, which was set by the Civil Code at the age of 18.

== Criminalised behaviours ==
Section 176 of the Portuguese Criminal Code criminalises the following behaviours:

- use or the incitement of an underaged person to participate in a pornographic scene (including live sex shows, photos, tapes, digital recordings, etc.)
- production or the distribution of any materials containing underaged persons engaging in pornography
- possession of pornographic materials containing underaged persons engaging in pornography with the purpose of distributing them
- use, incitement to use, production, distribution or possession with the intention of distribution of pornographic materials containing a realistic representation of an under aged person

== Penalties against pornographic involvement ==
This is a complex provision that, in practice, attempts to ban the participation of all persons below age 18 in any kind of scene of a pornographic nature.

The standard penalty for any of these actions is imprisonment for a period between one and five years. This standard penalty is subject to a number of aggravations and attenuations, however, depending on the circumstances.

This section of the Criminal Code has raised severe controversy. Its terminology is imprecise since it does not define "pornographic scene". Also, many have criticised the criminalisation of the "realistic representation of minors" because they see it a disproportionate restriction of the freedom of expression, a fundamental right protected by the Portuguese Constitution.

These difficulties caused Portuguese courts to be extremely cautious in applying this section of the Criminal Code. The case law varies widely and there is no legal certainty concerning the application of this provision.

== See also ==
- Legality of child pornography
  - Child pornography laws in the Netherlands
  - Child pornography laws in the United Kingdom
  - Child pornography laws in the United States
  - Child pornography laws in Australia
  - Child pornography laws in Canada
  - Child pornography laws in Japan
