= Junior idol =

Japanese child or teenager who has a career as a gravure idol, singer or actress

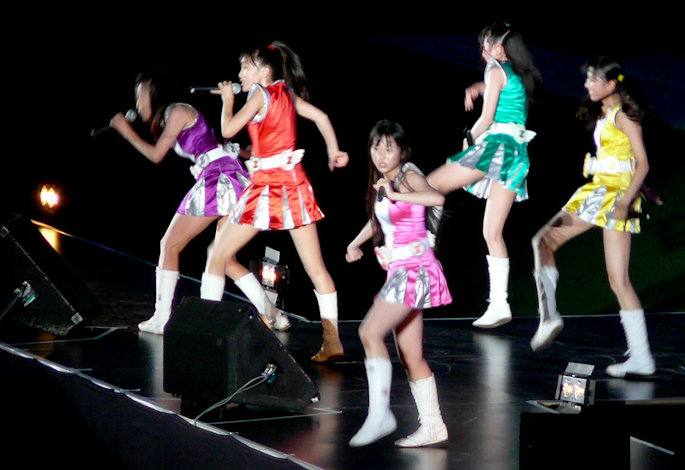
Momoiro Clover Z began as a junior idol group. Momoiro Clover Z is ranked as one of the most popular female idol groups according to 2013–2017 surveys.

A junior idol (ジュニアアイドル, junia aidoru), also known as a chidol (チャイドル, chaidoru; shortening of the words "child idol") or low teen idol (ローティーンアイドル, rōtīn aidoru), is a type of entertainer under the age of 18 or 16, manufactured and marketed for their image, attractiveness and personality. It is a sub-category of the idol culture in Japanese pop entertainment. Junior idols are primarily gravure idols who are marketed through photo books and image DVDs, but some are also trained in singing and acting. Unlike other child models, idols are commercialized through merchandise and endorsements by talent agencies, while maintaining an emotional connection with a passionate consumer fan base.

Junior idols have been seen as controversial due to their age, marketing demographic, and involvement in gravure modeling. Even though regulations have been tightened, the entertainment activities of junior idols under the age of 18, who are legally minors, are still in a situation of ambiguity as to what constitutes freedom of expression and what constitutes illegal obscene expression, in other words, the interpretation of the Child Pornography Prohibition Act. In 2014, the Child Pornography Prohibition Act was amended to also prohibit the possession of child pornography by adding the condition of "an image in which sexual parts are emphasized" to the definition of child pornography. This increased the likelihood that images of minors wearing swimsuits and other clothing would meet the definition of child pornography, and some businesses selling images of junior idols have withdrawn from the market.

== Definition ==
Junior idols are entertainers under the age of 18 or 16 who exist in a parasocial relationship with fans who support them by purchasing merchandise. Junior idols are often marketed through solo DVDs or photo books. The majority of junior idols belong to specialized talent agencies, some of which offer acting and voice training and are geared towards the production of television commercials, photobooks, and related materials. Though sources indicate revenue is relatively low for photographic models, a number of idols (and their parents) see this activity as a gateway to more mainstream media roles. In 2011, junior idols were paid up to ¥200,000 per photos shoot.

== History ==
The trend of junior idols dates back to the mid-1990s, a period marked by significant increase in the number of child models and works involving individuals in that age range. The term chidol, a neologism of the words "child" and "idol", was coined by columnist Akio Nakamori to describe this new phenomena. Eventually, this term fell out of use and was replaced by "junior idol". Compared to chidol, the term "junior idol" plays down the association with age and lends some credibility to the industry associating it with the legitimate mainstream idol culture in Japan.

== Distribution ==
Content is available in many formats, usually physical goods such as bond photobooks, CDs and DVDs, but also digital content in the form of Portable Document Format books, JPEG photo sets, high resolution movie clips, etc. To promote a particular idol, or to celebrate the release of a specific title, certain stores hold special events where fans get to meet the idols, shake hands with them, obtain autographs or take photographs, either polaroids or pictures taken with the customers' own cameras, in accordance with the amount of money spent on related goods (either regular DVDs, photobooks, etc., or multiple copies of the same title).

Concerning the contents of the titles put on sale, these include, in general terms, pictures or footage of the idols trying out a variety of outfits, such as school uniforms, bathing suits, gym clothes, yukata or even maid, police and anime-inspired costumes.

Some services providers, such as Imouto Club (清純いもうと倶楽部, Seijun Imōto Kurabu)—a subscription-based website—also feature short radio and movie dramas, available for download and later purchase on DVD.

== Controversy ==
The junior idol industry is a highly contentious one in Japan due to its depiction of underage children. Despite such disapproval, as of 2009, stores selling junior idol-related materials proliferate in prominent areas, such as Oimoya, a store located in Japan's well-known Akihabara shopping district. However, the store closed in 2015 due to a 2014 amendment to the Child Pornography Prohibition Act and a decline in customers.

In 2008, the Japan Committee for UNICEF launched the "Say 'NO' to Child Pornography" campaign in Japan, deeming images and magazines depicting junior idols in suggestive costumes and poses as child pornography. As part of the campaign, four major internet portal site providers in Japan removed junior idol-related content from their services. The campaign also garnered over 100,000 signatures in a petition to the Japanese government to amend its child pornography laws to criminalize possession of child pornography, including junior idol materials.

=== Legal status ===
Junior idol materials stand on legally ambiguous ground in Japan. Regulation of such materials comes under the Act on Punishment of Activities Relating to Child Prostitution and Child Pornography, and the Protection of Children (Child Pornography Prohibition Act) and Prefectural Ordinance of Juvenile Protection, which provide protection for those under the age of 18. The Tokyo, Osaka, Kanagawa, Aichi, and Hyogo prefectural ordinances require businesses that engage in commercial activities using subjects under the age of 18 (such as photo shoots) to submit a notification to the prefectural police commission of each prefecture to ensure in advance that their activities are not illegal. Failure to do so will result in the arrest of the offending business operator.

The Japanese Anti-child prostitution and pornography law was enacted in November 1999—and revised in 2004 to criminalize distribution of child pornography over the Internet—defines child pornography as the depiction "in a way that can be recognized visually, such a pose of a child relating to sexual intercourse or an act similar to sexual intercourse with or by the child", of "a pose of a child relating to the act of touching genital organs, etc." or the depiction of "a pose of a child who is naked totally or partially to arouse or stimulate the viewer's sexual desire."

On August 25, 2007, the Japanese branch of Amazon.com removed over 600 junior idol titles on grounds the likelihood these were produced in violation of the Japanese anti-child prostitution and pornography law was high.

On October 16, 2007, the Tokyo Metropolitan Police Department arrested four individuals, including the Chief Producer of the video production company Shinkosha, on suspicion of violating the Child Pornography Prohibition Act. The police determined that the footage filmed in February on the island of Bali, featuring a 17-year-old girl wearing a swimsuit, constituted child pornography as it emphasized the genital area and even revealed the shape of the genitals through the swimsuit. It was the first time in Japan that the police arrested the creators, despite the performers wearing swimsuits, and classified it as pornography.

In 2014, the Child Pornography Prohibition Act was amended to also prohibit the possession of child pornography by adding the condition of "an image in which sexual parts are emphasized" to the definition of child pornography. Under the amended act, it is not illegal to photograph minors in swimsuits, but posing them in a manner that emphasizes their sexual parts is illegal. This has increased the possibility that filming minors in swimsuits and other forms of appearance using conventional methods will fall under the definition of child pornography, and has caused some companies selling images of junior idols to pull out of the business.

== See also ==
- Gravure idol
- Child modeling
- Child erotica
- Teen idol
- Lolicon
- Kawaii
