= COPINE scale =

System for rating the severity of images of child sex abuse

The COPINE scale is a rating system created in Ireland and used in the United Kingdom to categorise the severity of images of child sex abuse. The scale was developed by staff at the COPINE ("Combating Paedophile Information Networks in Europe") project. The COPINE Project was founded in 1997, and is based in the Department of Applied Psychology, University College Cork, Ireland.

== Use ==
=== Therapeutic ===
The COPINE scale was originally developed for therapeutic psychological purposes.

More specifically, it is used to distinguish between child erotica and child pornography.

Professor Max Taylor, one of the academics working for the COPINE project, stated: "The significance of this distinction is to emphasise the potential sexual qualities of a whole range of kinds of photographs (and other material as well) not all of which may meet obscenity criteria."

=== Judicial ===
In the late 1990s, the COPINE project at the University College Cork, in cooperation with the Paedophile Unit of the London Metropolitan Police, developed a typology to categorize child abuse images for use in both research and law enforcement. The ten-level typology was based on analysis of images available on websites and internet newsgroups. Other researchers have adopted similar ten-level scales.

The COPINE Scale
1	Indicative	Non-erotic and non-sexualized pictures showing children wearing either underwear or swimsuits from either commercial sources or family albums. Pictures of children playing in normal settings, in which the context or organization of pictures by the collector indicates inappropriateness.
2	Nudist	Pictures of naked or semi-naked children in appropriate nudist settings, and from legitimate sources.
3	Erotic	Surreptitiously taken photographs of children in play areas or other safe environments showing either underwear or varying degrees of nakedness.
4	Posing	Deliberately posed pictures of children fully clothed, partially clothed or naked (where the amount, context and organization suggests sexual interest).
5	Erotic Posing	Deliberately posed pictures of fully, partially clothed or naked children in sexualized or provocative poses.
6	Explicit Erotic Posing	Pictures emphasizing genital areas, where the child is either naked, partially clothed or fully clothed.
7	Explicit Sexual Activity	Pictures that depict touching, mutual and self-masturbation, oral sex and intercourse by a child, not involving an adult.
8	Assault	Pictures of children being subject to a sexual assault, involving digital touching, involving an adult.
9	Gross Assault	Grossly obscene pictures of sexual assault, involving penetrative sex, masturbation or oral sex, involving an adult.
10	Sadistic/Bestiality	a. Pictures showing a child being tied, bound, beaten, whipped or otherwise subject to something that implies pain. b. Pictures where an animal is involved in some form of sexual behavior with a child.

=== The SAP scale ===
The 2002 case of Regina v Oliver in the Court of Appeal of England and Wales established a scale by which indecent images of children could be "graded". The five point scale, established by the Sentencing Advisory Panel for England and Wales and adopted in 2002, is known as the SAP scale. It is based on COPINE terminology and is often mistakenly referred to as such.

The SAP Scale
1	Nudity or erotic posing with no sexual activity
2	Sexual activity between children, or solo masturbation by a child
3	Non-penetrative sexual activity between adult(s) and child(ren)
4	Penetrative sexual activity between child(ren) and adult(s)
5	Sadism or bestiality

The SAP document gives a detailed explanation of how the COPINE scale was adapted. It also states that the COPINE scale was intended for therapeutic use and not designed for use in court. Examination of the categories will show that categories 2–5 of the SAP scale obviously correspond to categories 7–10 of the COPINE scale. Category 1 of the SAP scale seems to correspond vaguely to categories 4–6 of the COPINE scale. COPINE category 1 (indicative) was left off the SAP scale because "images of this nature would not be classed as indecent." The board found COPINE categories 2 & 3 to be disputable as to whether or not they can be classified as indecent.

=== Sexual Offences Definitive Guideline ===
On 1 April 2014, a new scale, replacing the SAP scale, was adopted for sentencing in England and Wales for crimes relating to indecent images of children, put into place by page 75 of the Sentencing Council's Sexual Offences Definitive Guideline.

Sexual Offences Definitive Guideline
Category A	Images involving penetrative sexual activity and/or images involving sexual activity with an animal or sadism
Category B	Images involving non-penetrative sexual activity
Category C	Other indecent images not falling within categories A or B

== See also ==
- Internet pornography
