= Duncan Shaw (judge) =

British Columbia Supreme Court member (1932–2025)

Duncan Weld Shaw
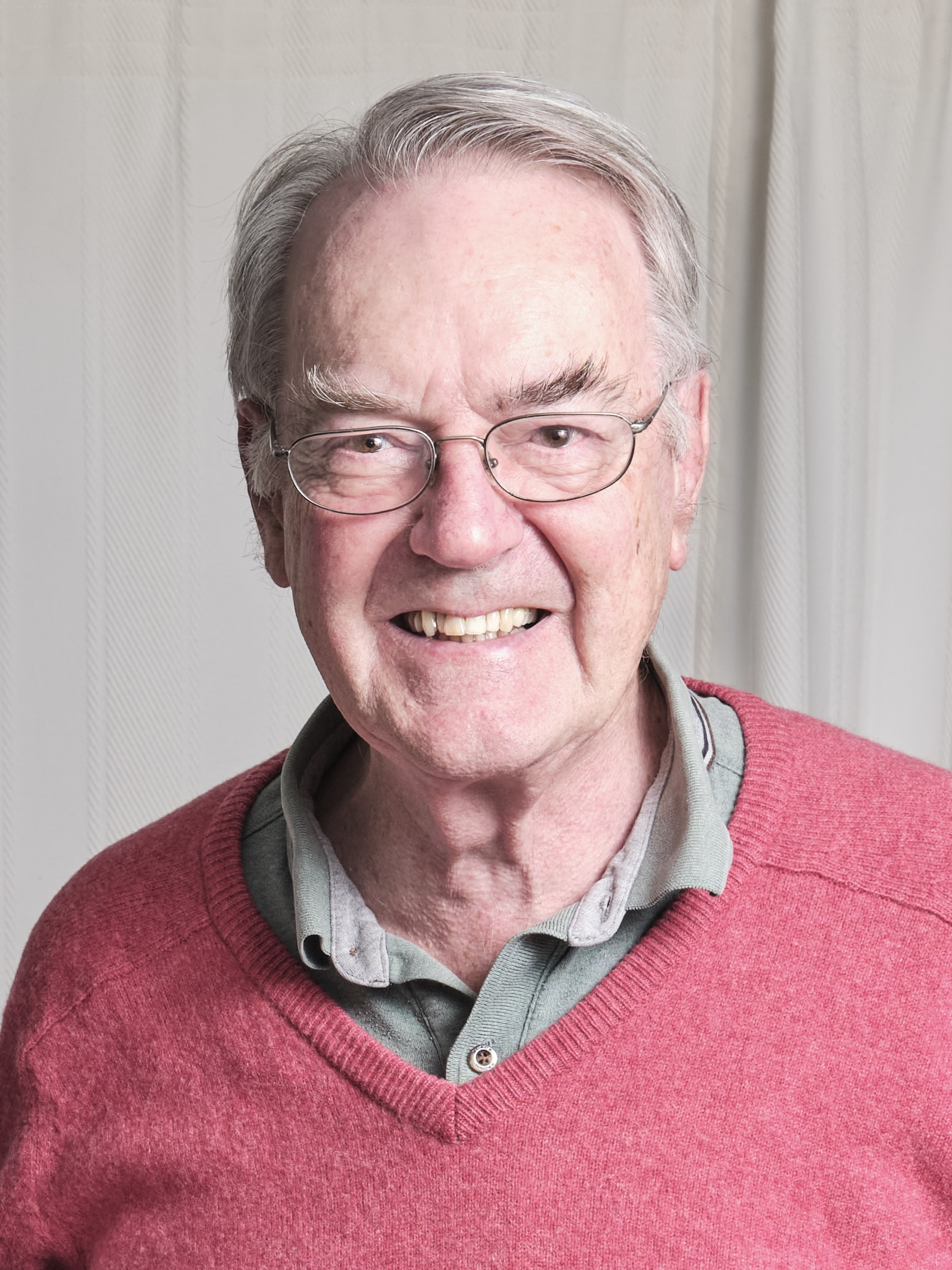
- Born: 21 November 1932; Vancouver, British Columbia, Canada
- Died: 24 March 2025 (aged 92)
- Occupations: Lawyer, judge and theoretical physicist
- Website: https://duncanshawphysics.ca/

Duncan Weld Shaw (1932-2025) was a prominent Vancouver, British Columbia lawyer and British Columbia Supreme Court Justice who in his retirement years developed a second career as a theoretical physicist.

== Early Life and Family ==
Shaw was born in Vancouver on November 21, 1932. His parents were Duncan Keith Shaw and Gladys Noyes Weld. His father worked as a timber cruiser on Vancouver Island and later as an executive with Macmillan Bloedel Limited.

He had two older siblings, Lois Esther Shaw Rain, and James Keith Shaw, who also had a legal career and became the Associate Chief Judge of the Provincial Court of British Columbia.

In 1961, Shaw married Patricia Nan Gardner. They had two children, Madeleine and Keith, and two grandchildren, Genevieve (Gigi) and Raven.

Shaw died on March 24, 2025.

== Education ==
Shaw graduated from Prince of Wales High School in 1950. He attended the University of British Columbia and graduated with a Bachelor of Arts (BA) Degree in 1955 and a Bachelor of Laws (LLB) Degree in 1956.

In addition, while at university, Shaw joined the Royal Canadian Air Force Reserve Training Plan and learned to fly. He was a pilot with the RCAF Reserves from 1955 to 1964.

== Legal career ==
Shaw started articling in 1957 at Davis and Co. and worked there for almost 30 years. He became the head of the firm’s litigation group and was the main litigator for some of the firm’s most important clients, including Macmillan Bloedel. Shaw became a senior partner at Davis and Co. and was appointed Queen’s Counsel and a Fellow of the American College of Trial Lawyers.

In 1987, he was appointed to the Supreme Court of British Columbia, where he served with distinction for 20 years. Justice Shaw took great interest in mentoring his law clerks, in whose lives and careers he took immense interest. He also committed to mastering the French language, and he became one of the few B.C. judges fluent enough to preside over cases in French.

Upon retirement from the court, Shaw returned to his old law firm from 2008 to 2015, in the role of counsel.

Justice Shaw gained national attention in 1998 when he ruled in R. v. Sharpe that Canada's law prohibiting possession of child pornography was unconstitutional. This decision was confirmed by the British Columbia Court of Appeal and later overruled by the Supreme Court of Canada, which did however carve out two exceptions to the law.

== Explorations in theoretical physics ==
Since his high school days, Shaw had an interest in theoretical physics, and this was rekindled in his retirement years.

Initially, Shaw was interested in exploring the physical cause of gravity. This led him to develop his own theory of gravity, based on a concept of flowing aether. He also explored electromagnetism, the quantum mechanics theory, the phenomenon of entanglement, the structure of matter, the cause of inertia, dark matter and super massive black holes.

Shaw wrote a number of papers and presented some to conferences. Several of his papers were peer reviewed and published in the international physics journal, Physics Essays.
