= Eli Langer =

Canadian artist (born 1967)

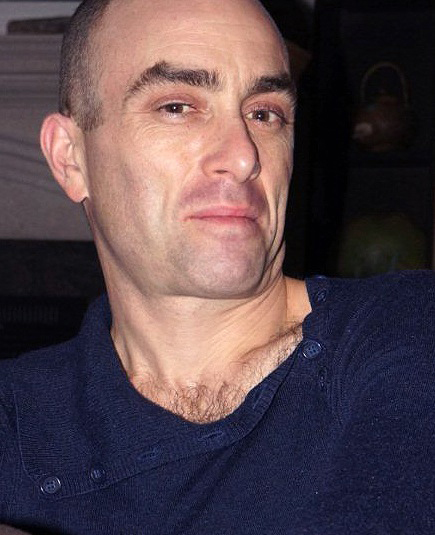
- Eli Langer, self portrait
- Born: Eli Langer; 1967 (age 58–59); Montreal, Quebec, Canada
- Known for: Painter, Graphic artist
- Notable work: 1993 Exhibit at Mercer Union

Eli Langer (born 1967 in Montreal, Quebec) is a Canadian visual artist. Langer rose to prominence in 1993, while 26 years old, in the Toronto art world with a solo exhibition at the Mercer Union Gallery in Toronto. The exhibition consisted of 8 paintings and 50 drawings addressing various issues of childhood sexuality. Toronto police raided the exhibition under Canada's new child pornography legislation and seized 5 paintings and 35 drawings. This event and ensuing media coverage created a national debate over the reach of law and freedom of expression.

== 1993 art show ==
A press release prior to the show opening suggests the curators knew the material could be controversial:

Langer's work focuses on the tender and often abject aspects of sexuality and intimacy. His images are largely informed by intuitive personal and social drives, exploring the phenomenon of intimacy where it exists without the compensation of social or cultural consent. In this series of paintings and drawings, Langer often boldly develops a sexual ambiguity that inadvertently addresses our cultural taboos and the formation of morality.

Langer's exhibition at the Mercer coincided with the addition of section 163.1 (the "Child Pornography" section) to the Canadian Criminal Code. That section of the Criminal Code forbids any depiction of a person under the age of 18 engaged in an explicit sexual activity or for a sexual purpose. The law makes no distinction between works of the imagination and works that are based on reality. Langer and the director of the Mercer Union Gallery were arrested by Toronto police, but ultimately the paintings were the only things put on trial.

Well-known figures of the Canadian art community participated in the trial in Langer's defence, including Michael Snow (artist), Avrom Isaacs (gallerist), Dennis Reid (former curator of the National Gallery of Canada), and Ronald Bloore (late artist). They testified that the works exhibited at the Mercer Union had "artistic merit" (a defence provided by s. 163.1 of the Criminal Code). Ultimately the works were exonerated and returned to Langer.

A witness for the Crown prosecuting the case, Ronald Bloore was no stranger to art censorship in Canada. In 1965 his wife, Toronto gallery owner Dorothy Cameron, had been charged and prosecuted in relation to an exhibition of art at her gallery and the results had been catastrophic for her. Eli Langer remembers the apparent willingness of Bloore to testify against his art as being strange, but at trial Ronald Bloore turned the leading questions of the Crown against them, citing the state censorship by the Nazis and calling Langer's artwork "marvellous." Taken aback by the trojan horse witness, the Crown called a recess. Bloore was greeted by an elated Eli Langer and his mother Pearl, and told them, "I've waited 27 years to get these bastards for what they did to my wife!" To this day Langer believes the difficulty of his trial was worth it for the poetic justice done by Ronald Bloore.

Langer's legal victory led to reinterpretation of "prior restraint" to prevent inexperienced police officers from again using an easily obtained "tele-warrant" to carry out similar raids on art exhibitions. Obtaining a warrant now requires the stricter scrutiny of experienced judges.

== Current artistic career ==
His difficult personal experience at the centre of the media sensationalism and legal interpretations of his practice at the time did not long interrupt his interests and development as an artist. He claims that the event was a culmination of testing the boundaries of moral and creative conventions and that the event briefly made art and freedom of expression a household topic across Canada.

According to Langer, his art practice developed beyond the morality issue fight-picking he did as a younger painter and with which he exhausted his willingness for dealing with legal and moralistic entities. He adds that he moved on, seeking clarity and distance from the event and clearing the way for a "more substantive articulation of ideas and art making practice ".

He has shown painting and other works in international exhibitions none of which referred to the art or controversy of the Mercer Union show or subsequent trial.

On January 18, 2008, Langer had his third solo show at Daniel Hug Gallery in Los Angeles. Langer taught painting in both the undergraduate and graduate program at UCLA in 2009. Langer exhibited at Clint Roenisch gallery in Toronto in 2015 and continues to paint and exhibit internationally.
