= Age of consent =

Minimum age for agreement to sexual activities

Age of consent for heterosexual sex outside of marriage by country or territory. Age varies by state in Australia, Mexico, and the United States. In China, Hong Kong is an exception, where the age of consent is 16, not 14. 12 13 14 15 16 17 18 21 (only Bahrain) Only in marriage allowed

The age of consent (Note: Age of Consent is abbreviated as "AoC" or "AOC".) is the age at which a person can consent to sexual acts. Engaging in sexual activity with a person younger than the age of consent is considered child sexual abuse or statutory rape. The person below the minimum age is considered the victim, and their sex partner the offender, although some jurisdictions provide exceptions through "Romeo and Juliet laws" if one or both participants are underage and are close in age.

The term age of consent typically does not appear in legal statutes. Generally, a law will establish the age below which it is illegal to engage in sexual activity with that person. It has sometimes been used with other meanings, such as the age at which a person becomes capable of entering marriage, but consent to sexual activity is the meaning now generally understood. It should not be confused with other laws regarding age minimums including, but not limited to, the age of majority, age of criminal responsibility, voting age, drinking age, and driving age.

While age of consent laws vary widely from jurisdiction to jurisdiction, nearly all jurisdictions set the age of consent between 14 and 18 years, with the exceptions of Cuba which sets the age of consent at 12, Argentina, Niger and Western Sahara which set the age of consent at 13, Mexico which sets the age of consent between 12 and 18, Bahrain which sets the age of consent at 21, and 14 Muslim states which set the consent by marriage only. The laws may also vary by the type of sexual act, the gender of the participants or other considerations, such as involving a position of trust; some jurisdictions may also make allowances for minors engaged in sexual acts with each other, rather than a single age. Charges and penalties resulting from a breach of these laws may range from a misdemeanor, such as corruption of a minor, to what is popularly called statutory rape.

There are many "grey areas" in this area of law, some regarding unspecific and untried legislation, others brought about by debates regarding changing societal attitudes, and others due to conflicts between federal and state laws. These factors all make age of consent an often confusing subject and a topic of highly charged debates.

== By continent ==
=== Africa ===
- Age of consent in Africa

=== Americas ===
- Age of consent in North America
  - Age of consent in the United States
- Age of consent in South America

=== Asia ===
- Age of consent in Asia

=== Europe ===
- Age of consent in Europe

=== Oceania ===
- Age of consent in Oceania

== History and social attitudes ==
=== Traditional attitudes ===
In traditional societies, the age of consent for a sexual union was a matter for the family to decide, or a tribal custom. In most cases, this coincided with signs of puberty, menstruation for a woman, and pubic hair for a man.

Reliable data for ages at marriage is scarce. In England, for example, the only reliable data in the early modern period comes from property records made after death. Not only were the records relatively rare, but not all bothered to record the participants' ages, and it seems that the more complete the records are, the more likely they are to reveal young marriages. Modern historians have sometimes shown reluctance to accept evidence of young ages of marriage, dismissing it as a 'misreading' by a later copier of the records.

In the 12th century, Gratian, the influential compiler of canon law in medieval Europe, accepted the age of puberty for marriage to be around 12 for girls and around 14 for boys but acknowledged consent to be meaningful if both children were older than seven years of age. There were authorities that said that such consent for entering marriage could take place earlier. Marriage would then be valid as long as neither of the two parties annulled the marital agreement before reaching puberty, or if they had already consummated the marriage. Judges sometimes honored marriages based on mutual consent at ages younger than seven: in contrast to established canon, there are recorded marriages of two- and three-year-olds.

In China, Law Code of the Qingyuan Reign (慶元條法事類), published in 1202 which catalogued laws that came into effect from 1127 to 1195, introduced statutory rape in the following decree: 'Successful intercourse with girls younger than 10 is considered rape in all circumstances, punishable by exile 3000 li away into the uncivilized provinces; if the rape was unsuccessful, exile by 500 li; If injury occurs in process, death by hanging'.

The first recorded age-of-consent law in Europe dates from 1275 in England; as part of its provisions on rape, the Statute of Westminster 1275 made it a misdemeanor to "ravish" a "maiden within age", whether with or without her consent. The phrase "within age" was later interpreted by jurist Sir Edward Coke (England, 17th century) as meaning the age of marriage, which at the time was 12 years of age.

The Great Ming Code, 25th section, Criminal Code on Rape came into effect from 1373, raised the age of consent to 12 by stating 'girls younger than 12 lack rational sexual desires, therefore any intercourse with them is considered the same as rape and therefore punishable by death with hanging'.

The American colonies followed the English tradition, and the law was more of a guide. For example, Mary Hathaway (Virginia, 1689) was only nine when she was married to William Williams. Sir Edward Coke "made it clear that the marriage of girls under 12 was normal, and the age at which a girl who was a wife was eligible for a dower from her husband's estate was 9 even though her husband be only four years old."

In the 16th century, a small number of Italian and German states set the minimum age for sexual intercourse for girls, setting it at 12 years. Towards the end of the 18th century, other European countries also began to enact similar laws. The first French Constitution of 1791 established the minimum age at 11 years. Portugal, Spain, Denmark and the Swiss cantons initially set the minimum age at 10 to 12 years.

Age of consent laws were historically difficult to follow and enforce. Legal norms based on age were not, in general, common until the 19th century, because clear proof of exact age and precise date of birth were often unavailable.

In 18th-century Australia it was thought that children were inherently sinful and vulnerable to sexual temptations. Punishment for "giving in" to these temptations was generally left to parents and was not seen as a government matter, except in the case of rape. Australian children had few rights and were legally considered the chattel of their parents. From the late 18th century, and especially in the 19th century, attitudes started to change. By the mid-19th century there was increased concern over child sexual abuse.

=== Reforms in the 19th and 20th centuries ===
There was a general shift in social and legal attitudes toward issues of sex during the modern era. Attitudes on the appropriate age of permission for females to engage in sexual activity drifted toward adulthood. While ages from 10 to 13 years were typically regarded as acceptable ages for sexual consent in Western countries during the mid-19th century, by the end of the 19th century changing attitudes towards sexuality and childhood resulted in the raising of the age of consent.

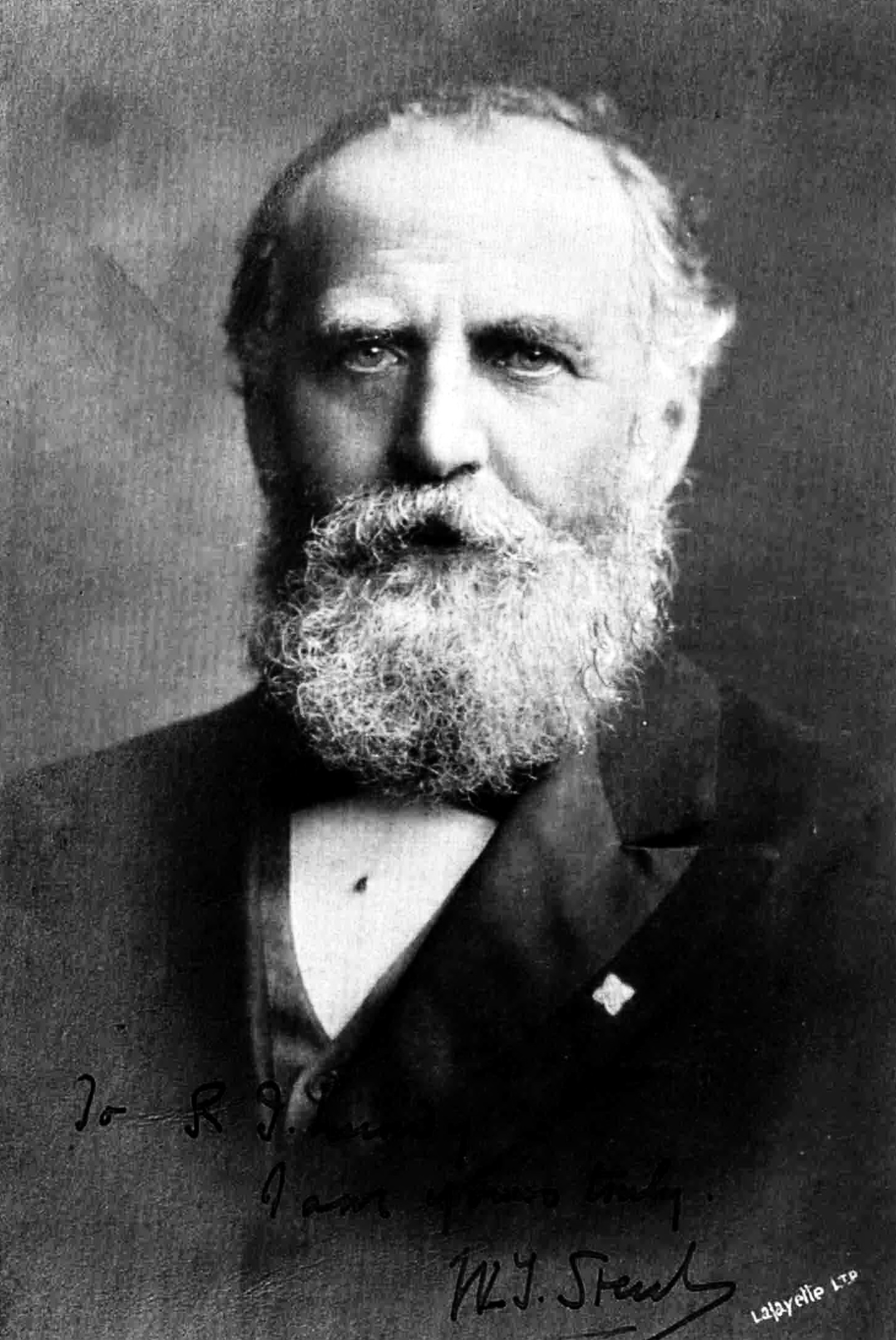
Several articles written by British investigative journalist William Thomas Stead in the late 19th century on the issue of child prostitution in London led to public outrage and ultimately to the raising of the age of consent to 16.

English common law had traditionally set the age of consent within the range of 10 to 12 years old, but the Offences Against the Person Act 1875 raised this to 13 in Great Britain and Ireland. Early feminists of the Social Purity movement, such as Josephine Butler and others, instrumental in securing the repeal of the Contagious Diseases Acts, began to turn towards the problem of child prostitution by the end of the 1870s. Sensational media revelations about the scourge of child prostitution in London in the 1880s then caused outrage among the respectable middle classes, leading to pressure for the age of consent to be raised again.

The investigative journalist William Thomas Stead of the Pall Mall Gazette was pivotal in exposing the problem of child prostitution in the London underworld through a publicity stunt. In 1885 he "purchased" one victim, Eliza Armstrong, the 13-year-old daughter of a chimney sweep, for five pounds and took her to a brothel where she was drugged. He then published a series of four exposés entitled The Maiden Tribute of Modern Babylon, which shocked its readers with tales of child prostitution and the abduction, procurement, and sale of young English virgins to Continental "pleasure palaces". The "Maiden Tribute" was an instant sensation with the reading public, and Victorian society was thrown into an uproar about prostitution. Fearing riots on a national scale, the Home Secretary, Sir William Harcourt, pleaded in vain with Stead to cease publication of the articles. A wide variety of reform groups held protest meetings and marched together to Hyde Park demanding that the age of consent be raised. The government was forced to propose the Criminal Law Amendment Act 1885, which raised the age of consent from 13 to 16 and clamped down on prostitution.

In the United States, as late as the 1880s most states set the minimum age at 10 to 12 (in Delaware, it was seven in 1895). Inspired by the "Maiden Tribute" articles, female reformers in the U.S. initiated their own campaign, which petitioned legislators to raise the legal minimum age to at least 16, with the ultimate goal to raise the age to 18. The campaign was successful, with almost all states raising the minimum age to between 16 and 18 years by 1920.

In France, Portugal, Denmark, the Swiss cantons and other countries, the minimum age was raised to between 13 and 16 years in the following decades. Though the original arguments for raising the age of consent were based on morality, since then the raison d'être of the laws has changed to child welfare and a so-called right to childhood or innocence.

In France, under the Napoleonic Code, the age of consent was set in 1832 at 11, and was raised to 13 in 1863. It was increased to 15 in 1945. In the 1970s, a group of prominent French intellectuals advocated for the repeal of the age of consent laws, but did not succeed.

In Spain, it was set in 1822 at "puberty age", and changed to 12 in 1870, which was kept until 1999, when it became 13; and in 2015 it was raised to 16.

=== 21st century ===
In the 21st century, concerns about child sex tourism and commercial sexual exploitation of children gained prominence, resulting in legislative changes in multiple jurisdictions, as well as the adoption of international laws.

The Council of Europe Convention on the Protection of Children against Sexual Exploitation and Sexual Abuse (Lanzarote, 25 October 2007), and the European Union's Directive 2011/92/EU of the European Parliament and of the Council of 13 December 2011 on combating the sexual abuse and sexual exploitation of children and child pornography were adopted.

The Optional Protocol on the Sale of Children, Child Prostitution and Child Pornography came into force in 2002.

The Protocol to Prevent, Suppress and Punish Trafficking in Persons, especially Women and Children, which came into force in 2003, prohibits commercial sexual exploitation of children.

The Council of Europe Convention on Action against Trafficking in Human Beings (which came into force in 2008) also deals with commercial sexual exploitation of children.

Some countries have raised their ages of consent in recent decades. These include in the Americas, Mexico in various states and federal law (in throughout the 21st century—from 12 to 15), Chile (in 2004—from 12 to 14), Guyana (in 2005—from 13 to 16), Canada (in 2008—from 14 to 16), Guatemala (in 2009—from 12 to 14), Trinidad and Tobago (in 2015—from 16 to 18), and Costa Rica (in 2017—from 15 to 18); and in Europe, Iceland (in 2007—from 14 to 15), Lithuania (in 2010—from 14 to 16), Croatia (in 2013—from 14 to 15), Spain (in 2015—from 13 to 16), Romania (in 2020—from 15 to 16), Estonia (in 2022—from 14 to 16) and Bosnia and Herzegovina (in 2025—from 14 to 15).

Other countries have lowered the age of consent, such as Northern Ireland (in 2008—from 17 to 16), Peru (in 2012—from 18 to 14), Malta (in 2018—from 18 to 16), Ecuador (in 2021—from 18 to 14) and Cuba (in 2022—from 14 to 12).

The International Criminal Court Statute does not provide a specific age of consent in its rape/sexual violence statute, but makes reference to sexual acts committed against persons "incapable of giving genuine consent"; and the explicative footnote states, "It is understood that a person may be incapable of giving genuine consent if affected by natural, induced or age-related incapacity." (see note 51)

=== Law ===
Sexual relations with a person under the age of consent is a crime in most countries; Jurisdictions use a variety of terms for the offense, including child sexual abuse, statutory rape, illegal carnal knowledge, corruption of a minor, besides others.

The enforcement practices of age-of-consent laws vary depending on the social sensibilities of the particular culture (see above). Often, enforcement is not exercised to the letter of the law, with legal action being taken only when a sufficiently socially-unacceptable age gap exists between the two individuals, or if the perpetrator is in a position of power over the minor (e.g. a teacher, minister, or doctor). The sex of each participant can also influence perceptions of an individual's guilt and therefore enforcement.

=== Age ===
The threshold age for engaging in sexual activity varies between jurisdictions. Most jurisdictions have set a fixed age of consent. However, some jurisdictions permit sex with a person after the onset of their puberty, such as Yemen, but only in marriage. Ages can also vary based on the type of calendar used, such as the lunar calendar, how birth dates in leap years are handled, or even the method by which birth date is calculated.

=== Defenses and exceptions ===
The age of consent is a legal barrier to the minor's ability to consent and therefore obtaining consent is not in general a defense to having sexual relations with a person under the prescribed age, for example:

==== Reasonable belief that the victim is over the age of consent ====
In some jurisdictions it is a defense if the accused can show their reasonable belief that the victim was over the age of consent. However, where such a defense is provided, it normally applies only when the victim is close to the age of consent or the accused can show due diligence in determining the age of the victim (e.g. an underage person who used a fake identification document claiming to be of legal age).

==== Marriage ====
In various jurisdictions, age of consent laws do not apply if the parties are legally married to each other. Ruhollah Khomeini, first Supreme Leader of Iran, wrote in Tahrir al-Wasilah that sexual penetration requires the girl to be at least 9 years old, but that other sexual acts are unobjectionable regardless their age, even if they are a "suckling infant".

==== Similar age ====
Many jurisdictions have passed so-called "Romeo and Juliet laws" which serve to reduce or eliminate the penalty of the crime in cases where the couple's age difference is minor and the sexual contact would not have been rape if both partners were legally able to give consent. In Canada, the age of consent is 16, but there are two close-in-age exemptions: sex with minors aged 14–15 is permitted if the partner is less than five years older, sex with minors aged 12–13 is permitted if the partner is less than two years older, as long as the partner is not in a position of trust over the other minor.

In the Philippines where the age of consent is also 16, consensual sex with minors of no younger than 13 years is allowed if the other partner is less than three years older.

Some such laws also take into account the couple's levels of development. For instance, the age of consent in Finland is 16, but the law states that the act will not be punished if "there is no great difference in the ages or the mental and physical maturity of the persons involved". In Slovenia, the age of consent is 15, but the activity is only deemed criminal if there is "a marked discrepancy between the maturity of the perpetrator and that of the victim".

==== Age under threshold ====
Another approach takes the form of a stipulation that sexual intercourse between a minor and an older partner is legal under the condition that the latter does not exceed a certain age. For example, the age of consent in the US state of Delaware is 18, but it is allowed for teenagers aged 16 and 17 to engage in sexual intercourse as long as the older partner is younger than 30.

==== Homosexual and heterosexual age discrepancies ====
Some jurisdictions, such as the Bahamas, UK overseas territory of the Cayman Islands, and Paraguay have a higher age of consent for same-sex sexual activity. However, such discrepancies are increasingly being challenged. Within Bermuda for example (since 1 November 2019 under section 177 of the Criminal Code Act 1907) the age of consent for vaginal and oral sex is 16, but for anal sex it is 18. In Canada, the United Kingdom and Western Australia, for example, the age of consent was formerly 21 for same-sex sexual activity between males (with no laws regarding lesbian sexual activities), while it was 16 for heterosexual sexual activity; this is no longer the case and the age of consent for all sexual activity is 16. In June 2019, the Canadian government repealed the section of the criminal code that set a higher age of consent for anal intercourse.

In this century, the national legislations of all European countries have harmonized the age of consent for homosexual acts in those where it was still higher than for heterosexual acts, resulting in age of consent homosexual reduction to ensure equality. These include Finland (in 2000—from 18 to 16), United Kingdom (in 2001—from 21 to 16), Cyprus (in 2002—from 18 to 17), Hungary (in 2002—from 18 to 14), Austria (in 2003—from 18 to 14), Serbia (in 2006—from 18 to 14), Portugal (in 2007—from 16 to 14), Gibraltar (in 2011—from 18 to 16) and Greece (in 2015—from 17 to 15). And in America United States (various states in 2003 by Lawrence v. Texas) and Chile (in 2022—from 18 to 14).

==== Gender-age differentials ====
In some jurisdictions (such as Indonesia), there are different ages of consent for heterosexual sexual activity that are based on the gender of each person. In countries where there are gender-age differentials, the age of consent may be higher for girls—for example in Papua New Guinea, where the age of consent for heterosexual sex is 16 for girls and 14 for boys, or they may be higher for males, such as in Indonesia, where males must be 19 years old and females must be 16 years old. There are also numerous jurisdictions—such as Kuwait and the Palestinian Territories—in which marriage laws govern the gender-age differential. In these jurisdictions, it is illegal to have sexual intercourse outside of marriage, so the de facto age of consent is the marriageable age. In Kuwait, this means that boys must be at least 17 and girls at least 15 years old.

==== Position of authority/trust ====
In most jurisdictions where the age of consent is below 18 (such as England and Wales and Canada), in cases where a person aged 18 or older is in a position of trust over a person under 18, the age of consent usually rises to 18 or higher. Examples of such positions of trust include relationships between teachers and students. For example, in England and Wales and Canada, the age of consent is 16, but if the person is a student of the older person it becomes 18.

==== Circumstances of the relationship ====
In several jurisdictions, it is illegal to engage in sexual activity with a person under a certain age under certain circumstances regarding the relationship in question, such as if it involves taking advantage of or corrupting the morals of the young person. For example, while the age of consent is 14 in Germany, it is illegal for a person over 21 to engage in sexual activity with a person under 16 if the activity exploits the inexperience of the younger person. Another example is in Mexico, where there is a crime called "estupro" defined as sexual activity with a person over the age of consent but under a certain age limit (generally 18) in which consent of the younger person was obtained through seduction and/or deceit. In Pennsylvania, the age of consent is officially 16, but if the older partner is 18 or older, they may still be prosecuted for corruption of minors for their corruption or tending to corrupt the morals of the younger person.

=== Extraterritoriality ===
A growing number of countries have specific extraterritorial legislation that prosecutes their citizens in their homeland should they engage in illicit sexual conduct in a foreign country with children. In 2008, ECPAT reported that 44 countries had extraterritorial child sex legislation. For example, PROTECT Act of 2003, a federal United States law bans sexual activity by its citizens with foreigners or with U.S. citizens from another state, if the partner is under 18 and the activity is illegal under the federal, state, or local law. This applies in cases where any of the partners travels into or out of the United States, or from one state into another, for the purpose of an illegal sexual encounter.

== Other issues ==
=== Gender of participants ===
Age of consent same sex partners equaldex

There is debate as to whether the gender of those involved should lead to different treatment of the sexual encounter, in law or in practice. Traditionally, age of consent laws regarding vaginal intercourse were often meant to protect the chastity of unmarried girls. Many feminists and social campaigners in the 1970s have objected to the social importance of virginity, and have also attempted to change the stereotypes of female passivity and male aggression; demanding that the law protect children from exploitation regardless of their gender, rather than dealing with concerns of chastity. This has led to gender-neutral laws in many jurisdictions. On the other hand, there is an opposing view which argues that the act of vaginal intercourse is an "unequal act" for males and females, due to issues such as pregnancy, increased risk of STDs, and risk of physical injury if the girl is too young and not physically ready. In the US, in Michael M. v. Superior Ct.450 U.S. 464 (1981) it was ruled that the double standard of offering more legal protection to girls is valid because "the Equal Protection Clause does not mean that the physiological differences between men and women must be disregarded".

Traditionally, many age of consent laws dealt primarily with men engaging in sexual acts with underage girls and boys (the latter acts often falling under sodomy and buggery laws). This means that in some legal systems, issues of women having sexual contact with underage partners were rarely acknowledged. For example, until 2000, in the UK, before the Sexual Offences (Amendment) Act 2000, there was no statutory age of consent for lesbian sex. In New Zealand, before 2005, there were no age of consent laws dealing with women having sex with underage boys. Previously, in Fiji, male offenders of child sexual abuse could receive up to life imprisonment, whilst female offenders would receive up to seven years. Situations like these have been attributed to societal views on traditional gender roles, and to constructs of male sexuality and female sexuality; according to E Martellozzo, "[V]iewing females as perpetrators of sexual abuse goes against every stereotype that society has of women: women as mothers and caregivers and not as people who abuse and harm". Alissa Nutting argues that women are not acknowledged as perpetrators of sex crimes because society does not accept that women have an autonomous sexuality of their own.

=== Marriage and the age of consent ===
The age at which a person can be legally married can differ from the age of consent. In jurisdictions where the marriageable age is lower than the age of consent, those laws usually override the age of consent laws in the case of a married couple where one or both partners are below the age of consent. Some jurisdictions prohibit all sex outside of marriage irrespective of age, as in the case of Yemen.

=== Prostitution ===
In many countries, there are specific laws dealing with child prostitution.

=== Pornography and "jailbait" images ===
In some countries, states, or other jurisdictions, the age of consent may be lower than the age at which a person can appear in pornographic images and films. In many jurisdictions, the minimum age for participation and even viewing such material is 18. As such, in some jurisdictions, films and images showing individuals under the age of 18, but above the age of consent, that meet the legal definition of child pornography are prohibited despite the fact that the sexual acts depicted are legal to engage in otherwise under that jurisdiction's age of consent laws. In those cases, it is only the filming of the sex act that is the crime as the act itself would not be considered a sex crime. For example, in the United States under federal law it is a crime to film minors below 18 in sexual acts, even in states where the age of consent is below 18. In those states, charges such as child pornography can be used to prosecute someone having sex with a minor, who could not otherwise be prosecuted for statutory rape, provided they filmed or photographed the act.

Jailbait images can be differentiated from child pornography, as they do not feature minors before the onset of puberty, nor do they contain nudity. The images are, however, usually sexualized, often featuring tween or young teenagers in bikinis, skirts, underwear or lingerie. Whether or not these images are legal is debated. When questioned regarding their legality legal analyst Jeffrey Toobin stated he thought it was not illegal, though legal expert Sunny Hostin was more skeptical, describing jailbait images as "borderline" child pornography which may be illegal.

=== Health ===
The human immune system continues to develop after puberty. The age of exposure has an influence upon if the immune system can fend off infections in general, and this is also true in the case of some sexually transmitted diseases. For example, a risk factor for HPV strains causing genital warts is sexual debut at a young age; if this extends to the cancer causing strains, then sexual debut at a young age would potentially also increase risk of persistence of HPV infections that cause the very HPV induced cancers that are being diagnosed in spiking numbers of relatively young people.

== Initiatives to change the age of consent ==
Age-of-consent reform refers to the efforts of some individuals or groups, for different reasons, to alter or abolish age-of-consent laws. These efforts advocate positions such as:

- Introductions of close-in-age exceptions.
- Reducing the age-of-consent for homosexual activity to match that of heterosexual activity.
- A change in the way that age-of-consent laws are examined in court.
- Either increases in the ages of consent or more severe penalties or both.
- Either decreases in the ages of consent or less severe penalties or both.
- Abolition of the age-of-consent laws either permanently or as a temporary, practical expedient.

== See also ==
- Age disparity in sexual relationships
- Age of accountability
- Age of candidacy
- Age of Consent Act, 1891 (British India)
- Age-of-consent reform in the United Kingdom
- Age of consent by country
- Age of criminal responsibility
- Age of majority
- Age of reason (canon law)
- Child sexual abuse
- French petition against age-of-consent laws
- Gillick competence
- Legal age
- Mature minor doctrine
- Minors and abortion
- Brain matures at 25 myth
