= Child erotica =

Non-pornographic material of children used for sexual purposes

Child erotica is non-pornographic material relating to children that is used by any individuals for sexual purposes. It is a broader term than child pornography, incorporating material that may cause sexual arousal such as nonsexual images, books or magazines on children or pedophilia, toys, diaries, or clothes. Law enforcement investigators have found that child erotica is often collected by pedophiles and child sexual abuse offenders. It may be collected as a form of compulsive behavior and as a substitute for illegal underage pornography and is often a form of evidence for criminal behavior.

The history of child erotica goes back at least as far as the paintings of the ancient Greeks, and continues through England's Libertine movement of the 1600s to the advent of the printing press, the camera and the case of Lewis Carroll. Painters of child erotica have included, for example, Balthus.

Some of the images are distributed over the internet and presented in a fashion similar to non-erotic child modeling. Child beauty pageantry, which has attracted millions of viewers to shows such as Little Miss Perfect and Toddlers and Tiaras, is sometimes viewed as a form of child erotica similar to child modeling in that the children appear in provocative poses in bikinis and short skirts; but some participants' parents argue that the pageants help their children build positive qualities such as poise, individuality, and confidence.

Much as there has been a push to relabel underage pornography as "abuse images", the use of the term "child erotica" is controversial due to the artistic and literary connotations of the word "erotica".

== Countries ==
=== Japan ===
The Japanese Law Banning Child Prostitution and Pornography, enacted in 2010, defines child pornography as any image of a human under 18 years old "naked or partially naked, which is sexually stimulating."

The Publishers Ethics Committee of the Japan Magazine Publishers' Association checks bookstores for inappropriate publications and has issued warnings to publishers of pornographic manga (books). However, committee members have said it is not easy to determine whether an image crosses the line from art to child pornography.

=== United Kingdom ===
Newsgroups in the alt.* hierarchy have included, for example, alt.binaries.pictures.child.erotica.male and alt.binaries.pictures.child.erotica.female. In 2001–2002, the Internet Watch Foundation and Crown Prosecution Service considered that an Internet service provider knowingly carrying such a group name could be committing an offense relating to illegal advertisements.

=== United States ===
Depictions of even a clothed child violate U.S. federal law 18 U.S.C. § 2252(a)(2), 18 U.S.C. § 2252(a)(4), and 18 U.S.C. § 2256(2)(E) if they constitute "lascivious" exhibitions of the genitalia or pubic area. The 10th Circuit Court of Appeals has defined "lascivious" as "tending to excite lust; lewd; indecent; obscene; sexual impurity; tending to deprave the morals in respect to sexual relations."

In the United States, some members of the Congress have proposed prohibiting certain child modeling sites. Some states are considering similar legislation. Opponents of such legislation argue that it would probably be ruled as violating the First Amendment to the United States Constitution.

In February 2018, a New Jersey law against child erotica went into effect. The law defines sexually suggestive portrayals of a child as those which depict a child's less than completely and opaquely covered intimate parts, or which depict any form of contact with a child's intimate parts in a manner that, by means of the posing, composition, format, or animated sensual details, emits sensuality with sufficient impact to concentrate prurient interest on the child, or which more simply depict a child for purposes of sexual stimulation or gratification. Anthony Domenick became the first defendant to be charged for possession of child erotica. However, in State v. Higginbotham, Docket No. A-2548-21, 475 N.J. Super. 205, decided on March 24, 2023, the New Jersey Superior Court, Appellate Division held that the state's child erotica law is unconstitutional because "[t]he child erotica amendment to the [child] endangerment statute, N.J.S.A. 2C:24-4, is overbroad because it proscribes possession of protected speech. Because the amendment's definition of child erotica does not require the depiction of a real child engaged in a sex act or the lewd portrayal of a child's genitals, the statute is not subject to the Ferber standard for child pornography, and the State may only regulate the distribution of child erotica if the child erotica amendment complies with the Miller standard for obscenity." 475 N.J. Super. at 235. Furthermore, the Appellate Division held that the definition of child erotica also "exceeds the definition of obscenity and thus proscribes protected speech." 475 N.J. Super. at 237. This case is currently (as of November 29, 2023) on appeal to the New Jersey Supreme Court (Docket No. A-57-22).

Child erotica was defined in United States v. Paul D. Edwards as materials or items that are sexually arousing to persons having a sexual interest in minors but that are not, in and of themselves, obscene or that do not necessarily depict minors in sexually explicit poses or positions. In that case, a panel of the U.S. Court of Appeals for the 10th Circuit, which included Neil Gorsuch, found that an affidavit showing a suspect had a history of publicly posting child erotica and making comments suggesting he was sexually attracted to the children depicted in the erotica did not establish probable cause to support a search warrant for child pornography.

In United States v. Caldwell, the U.S. Court of Appeals for the 6th Circuit found that child erotica is admissible to show knowledge and intent to possess child pornography, as child erotica is evidence of a sexual interest in children, and the total quantity of child erotica makes it less likely that the defendant was unaware of its presence.

Similarly, in United States v. Vosburgh, the U.S. Court of Appeals for the 3rd Circuit admitted as evidence forty-six non-pornographic images of prepubescent girls in swimsuits and thirty pictures of Loli-chan, a 13-year old camgirl, finding that the "probative value of the Loli-chan pictures was not insignificant" in suggesting that Vosburgh harbored a sexual interest in children, knowingly possessed the child pornography found on his computer, and purposefully accessed a link he thought would lead to child pornography. The court cited a case, United States v. Dornhofer, in which the U.S. Court of Appeals for the 4th Circuit ruled admissible a defendant's notebook containing pictures of nude children, novels dealing with incest, and teen erotica magazines.

Paul Reubens, the actor best known for playing Pee-wee Herman, acknowledged possessing a massive collection of "vintage erotica" such as "a young man with his hand on his thigh". His lawyer cited as another piece from the collection, "a black-and-white tintype from 1901 with a young man of indeterminate, 17- to 19-year-old age, laying on the beach after having gone skinny-dipping" and claimed this collection was erotica to which the state's child pornography law did not apply. Reubens ultimately pleaded guilty to a misdemeanor obscenity charge.

==== Webe Web ====
In July 2001, Wired News published a story about child modeling websites that described Lil' Amber, which was a website operated by the web hosting company Webe Web Corporation located in Florida. Webe Web was, at the time, the oldest child modeling site service on the Internet. In November 2001, the NBC television station serving Miami, FL, ran a story entitled "Selling Innocence." A reporter "went undercover" to contact the site operators, and then tracked down Amber (a pseudonym), the model featured in Lil' Amber, at her family's farm in Palm Beach County. The news report prompted Florida Congressman Mark Foley (R-Palm Beach County) to propose legislation banning child modeling websites. (Note: Foley would later resign from office stemming from allegations of inappropriate conduct with a teenage boy.)

Jeff Libman, Marc Evan Greenberg and Webe Web Corporation were indicted in November 2006 in the Northern District of Alabama for conspiracy to produce images of child pornography and transportation of images of child pornography, although the images contained no nudity or sexual activity. Immediately, all Webe Web child model sites went offline after Internet domains and servers were seized by law enforcement. Marc Evan Greenberg and Jeff Libman pleaded not guilty to all charges.

In 2007, Jeff Pierson, a photographer from Alabama, pleaded guilty to conspiracy to transport child pornography and transportation of child pornography. Pierson's images were published by Webe Web. Pierson cooperated with Federal Authorities after having his home raided by law enforcement in early 2005.

Some parents said they were unaware of the imagery being taken of their children, and some had signed over temporary legal custody of their child to Pierson during the modeling session. Pierson maintained that all the parents were aware of the websites.

In a separate case, unrelated to images connected to Webe Web, Jeff Libman was indicted by a grand jury in the Southern District of Florida on April 28, 2009, for receiving, possessing and distributing child pornography. Libman was first identified by the U.S. Postal Inspection Service (USPIS) and the FBI during an investigation of Webe Web Corp., a Florida-based company. According to court documents, USPIS and FBI agents seized large volumes of computer media during the execution of a search warrant at Libman's residence in Fort Lauderdale. In his plea agreement, Libman admitted he received images that depict prepubescent children engaged in sadistic or masochistic conduct. On November 13, 2009, Libman was sentenced to seven years and three months in prison. He had faced a maximum possible term of 20 years in prison. The case was prosecuted by Assistant Deputy Chief Alexandra R. Gelber and Trial Attorney Elizabeth M. Yusi of the Criminal Division's Child Exploitation and Obscenity Section (CEOS) and Assistant U.S. Attorney A. Marie Villafaña of the Southern District of Florida. The case was investigated by USPIS, the FBI and CEOS’ High Tech Investigative Unit.

Company vice-president Jeffrey Robert Libman of Fort Lauderdale, Florida, pleaded guilty and was sentenced in December 2010 to nine years in prison. In accordance to his plea agreement, he admitted that 16 images received from Pierson were child pornography as defined by the Indictment.

President Marc Evan Greenberg pleaded guilty in April 2010 to one count of money laundering, based on his processing of the money generated by Webe Web. He was sentenced in January 2011 to serve more than two and a half years in prison.

On February 9, 2011, Pierson was sentenced to 67 months in prison and 10 years on supervised release. His sentence was delayed pending the outcome of the case against Libman, Greenberg and Webe Web Corp.

==== A Little Agency ====
In early 2006, Matthew Duhamel and Charles Granere, the operators of the child modeling agencies "A Little Agency" and "The VMS" were arrested on charges of child pornography. Neither A Little Agency nor the VMS distributed nude photographs, but federal prosecutors argued that they still contained "lascivious exhibitions" of the genitalia based on the six-part Dost test. Federal prosecutors claimed the websites dealt in images of girls as young as nine wearing scant clothing in suggestive poses. One photo reportedly showed a nine-year-old girl in "black stiletto pumps, a black lace thong, black bra, and a black jacket" sitting on a dining room table, according to court records. The operators were indicted on transportation of child pornography, possession of child pornography and receipt of child pornography. Attorneys filed a motion to dismiss the charges against them arguing that the pictures of young girls in suggestive poses on the websites they operated did not rise to the level of pornography. However, the judge assigned to the case, Chief Judge Campbell, denied the motion to dismiss, noting that the U.S. Supreme Court has determined fully clothed pictures can be considered pornographic. Eventually, in 2007, both of the operators were convicted and sentenced to five years in prison.

== See also ==
- Child beauty pageants
- Depictions of child nudity
- Federal Bureau of Investigation
- Immigration and Customs Enforcement
- Jailbait images
- United States Postal Inspection Service
- Cuties

== Sources ==
- Betsy Cameron, Lisanne: A Young Model, 1979: Clarkson N. Potter.
- H.R. 1142, 109th Congress, 1st Session, Child Modeling Exploitation Prevention Act, March 8, 2005.
- Mike Brunker, "Legal child porn under fire" MSNBC report, March 28, 2002.
- Mike Brunker, "Young 'model' sites feel the heat: Porn, sexual exploitation charges leveled against 3 operators", MSNBC, July 11, 2002.
- The PJCrew Story. (www.archive.org)
- Scheeres, Julia (July 23, 2001). "Girl Model Sites Crossing Line?". Wired News.
- Selling Innocence NBC 6 investigative report Part 1 November 8, 2001; Part 2 November 9, 2001.
- Selling Innocence NBC 6 followup: "Child Modeling Web Site Owner Held On Child Porn Charges; Congressmen Seeking Legislation To Prevent Child Exploitation On The Net" Posted April 18, 2002; updated May 17, 2002.
- Selling Innocence TV movie IMDb entry
