= Child pornography in the Philippines =

Various groups have taken steps to combat growing commercial sexual exploitation of children and child pornography in the Philippines. In 2016, UNICEF declared that the Philippines is one of the top sources of child pornography.

== UNICEF Manila study ==
According to a book by Arnie Trinidad entitled Child Pornography in the Philippines published by UNICEF Manila, a prominent case happened in Pagsanjan, Laguna, a rural community south of Manila. The case, according to Trinidad, involved the victimization of 590 children and adolescents aged 7 to 17 years old, by 22 American and European pedophiles who were involved in the production of pornography, drug abuse, and the sexual abuse of children. The study, published in 2005, documents other cases perpetrated by both foreign and local pedophiles and includes in depth analysis of the ongoing problem, in the context of the social, economic and legal environment.

The UNICEF Manila study states that social factors increase the propensity of children to be victimized in pornography. Among these are the commercial sexual exploitation of children, sex tourism, poverty, peer influence, availability of technology, cultural factors, among others.

== Convention on the Rights of the Child ==
In 2003, the Philippines ratified their signing of the United Nations Optional Protocol to the Convention on the Rights of the Child on the Sale of Children, Child Prostitution and Child Pornography; the protocol requires its signatories to recognize child pornography as a crime against children and to treat any act that contributes to production or distribution of child pornography as a criminal offense, within two years of ratification. Although fully compliant comprehensive legislation has not yet been enacted, Philippine law criminalizes the use of children in any aspect of the production or distribution of pornography, defining a "child" as younger than 18 years; and with maximum penalties required if the child involved is younger than 12 years old.

== Anti-Child Pornography Alliance ==
On September 15, 2007, the Children and Youth Secretariat of the Anti-Child Pornography Alliance (ACPA-Pilipinas) in the Philippines launched Batingaw Network "to protect and save children from all forms of abuses and exploitations." It is the largest anti-child pornography movement in the Philippines to date. It declared September 28 as the National Day of Awareness and Unity against Child Pornography.

=== People v. Luisa Pineda ===
The Supreme Court of the Philippines in a judgment by Justice Mario Lopez in G.R. No. 262941 (People v. Luisa Pineda, February, 2024) affirmed the lower courts' rulings that found Luisa Pineda guilty of violating the Anti-Child Pornography Act of 2009 and the Cybercrime Prevention Act of 2012 qualified with the use of a computer system (violation of Sections 4(a), (b), and (c) of Republic Act No. (RA) 9775 or the Anti-Child Pornography Act of 2009, in relation to Section 4(c)(2) of RA 10175 or the Cybercrime Prevention Act of 2012). Pineda was thus sentenced to suffer the penalty of imprisonment of reclusion perpetua, a fine of PHP 2,000,000 and PHP 300,000 in civil damages.

== See also ==
- Legality of child pornography
