= Ages of consent in Latin America =

Ages of consent in Latin America are discussed in the following articles:

- Ages of consent in Mexico (North America)
- Ages of consent in North America
- Ages of consent in South America
