= Age of consent in Oceania =

The ages of consent for sexual activity vary from age 15 to 18 across Australia, New Zealand and other parts of Oceania. The specific activity and the gender of its participants is also addressed by the law. The minimum age is the age at or above which an individual can engage in unfettered sexual relations with another person of minimum age.

Close-in-age exceptions may exist and are noted where applicable.

In Vanuatu the homosexual age of consent is set higher at 18, while the heterosexual age of consent is 15. Same sex sexual activity is illegal at any age for males in Papua New Guinea, Kiribati, Samoa, Niue, Tonga and Tuvalu; it is outlawed for both men and women in the Solomon Islands. In all other places the age of consent is independent of sexual orientation or gender.

Scope: all jurisdictions per list of sovereign states and dependent territories in Oceania.

== Australia ==
Age of consent in Australia: 16 17

Australia is a federation of States and Territories, with each State and Territory having the primary jurisdiction over age of consent issues within its territory. However, as a result of the international affairs power under Australia's constitution, a 1997 United Nations Human Rights Committee ruling has resulted in States repealing rules that differentiated between homosexual and heterosexual people on age of consent issues.

=== Regulations by state ===
State	Difference in age exemption applies	Age of consent
New South Wales	14	16
Queensland	–	16
South Australia	16	17
Tasmania	12	17
Victoria	12	16
Western Australia	13	16
Northern Territory	–	16
Australian Capital Territory	10	16

=== Federal laws ===
Under federal legislation that applies to all Australians, it is an offence for an Australian citizen, resident or body corporate while outside of Australia to have sexual intercourse with a person under the age of 16 or to induce a child under the age of 16 to have sexual intercourse, or be somehow involved in a similar sexual act.

Sex between consenting adults (18 or over) in private, regardless of gender or sexual orientation cannot be outlawed under section 4 of the Human Rights (Sexual Conduct) Act 1994.

=== Australian Capital Territory ===
It is an offence in the Australian Capital Territory to have sexual intercourse with a person under the age of 16. However, it is a defence if the younger party was aged 10 years or older and the offender was not more than 2 years older than the younger party. It is also an offence to have sexual intercourse with a person under the age of 18 if that person is under the care of the offender (guardian, teacher etc.).

=== Coral Sea Islands Territory ===
The laws of the Australian Capital Territory apply to the Coral Sea Islands Territory.

=== New South Wales ===
It is an offence in New South Wales to have sexual intercourse with a person under the age of 16 or attempt such an offence. It is also an offence to have sexual intercourse with a person under the age of 18 if that person is under the care of the offender (guardian, teacher, etc.). There is a close-in-age defence that allows those aged 14 and 15 to consent to sex with those less than two years older. This defence was added as section 80AG as part of the Criminal Legislation Amendment (Child Sexual Abuse) Act 2018 No 33.

=== Norfolk Island ===
It is an offence in Norfolk Island for a person to have sexual intercourse or commit an act of indecency with a person 'under the age of 16'. The Australian Government has proposed to introduce a new offence of sexual intercourse with a young person under special care based on the law in the Australian Capital Territory.

=== Northern Territory ===
It is an offence in the Northern Territory to have sexual intercourse with a person under the age of 16, or attempt such an offence. It is also an offence to have sexual intercourse with a person under the age of 18 if that person is under the care of the offender (guardian, teacher etc.).

=== Queensland ===
The age of consent in Queensland is 16 and there is no close-in-age exception. It is illegal to have carnal knowledge of a person under the age of 16, including all types of sexual activity. Legislation in September 2016 lowered and equalised the age of consent for anal sex to 16. The age may be raised to 18 an adult is a carer or supervisor to a child who is 16 or 17.

=== South Australia ===
It is an offence in South Australia to engage in any activity which involves fellatio, cunnilingus or placing any part of the body within the labia majora, vagina or anus of a person under the age of 17 unless they are lawful spouses. The Australian Marriage Act can permit someone who is 18 or over to marry a 16-year-old. But, it is a defence if the person is 16 at the time of the offence and either the offender is under 17 years of age or believe on reasonable grounds that the other person is 17 or older. It is also an offence to have sexual intercourse with a person under the age of 18 if that person is under the care of the offender (guardian, teacher etc.).

=== Tasmania ===
It is an offence in Tasmania to have sexual intercourse with a person under the age of 17. However, it is a defence if the younger person was aged 12 years or older and the offender was not more than 3 years their senior or, if the younger person was of or above 15 years and the offender was not more than 5 years their senior.

=== Victoria ===
It is an offence in Victoria to sexually penetrate a person under the age of 16. However, it is a defence if the younger party was aged 12 years or older and the offender was not more than 2 years older than the younger person, or they were married. It is also an offence for a person having the care of a person under the age of 18 (guardian, teacher etc.) to sexually penetrate that person. A person under the age of 18 is not allowed to engage in commercial sexual services or be on premises used for commercial sexual services.

=== Western Australia ===
It is an offence in Western Australia to sexually penetrate a person under the age of 16. It is also an offence for a person in a position of authority over a person under the age of 18 to have sex with that person.

== Clipperton Island (France) ==
The laws of France where applicable apply. (These specify a general age of consent of 15.)

== Cook Islands ==
The age of consent is set at 16 years in Cook Islands, regardless of gender and/or sexual orientation.

=== Laws passed on decriminalizing homosexuality ===
The new bill that took effect on 1 June 2023, officially decriminalized homosexuality in Cook Islands.

== Federated States of Micronesia ==
The states' statutory rape laws apply to children age 13 and below in Yap and Kosrae and age 15 and below in Pohnpei. The age of consent in Chuuk state is 18. The age of consent in Chuuk was raised due to campaigning led by Chuuk Women's Council.

== Fiji ==
Under the Crimes Decree of 2009, the age of consent in Fiji is 16, regardless of sexual orientation and/or gender. The relevant article is 215 – defilement of young persons between 13 and 16 years of age.

== French Polynesia (France) ==
The laws of France where applicable apply. (These specify a general age of consent of 15.) See Ages of consent in Europe#France.

== Kiribati ==
The age of consent in Kiribati is 15 (sections 133, 134 & 135), but homosexual sex is illegal at all ages (sections 153, 154 & 155). Furthermore, section 132 prohibits taking a girl under 18 out of the care of her parents or guardian for the purpose of sexual intercourse, while section 136 prohibits procuring a girl under 18 for sexual intercourse.

== Marcus Island (Japan) ==
Marcus Island is administratively under the government of Tokyo.

== Marshall Islands ==
The age of consent in Marshall Islands is 16. Section 152(A) of the Criminal Code provides that anyone engaging in sexual penetration with a person under 16 is liable to imprisonment for up to 25 years.

== Nauru ==
In Nauru it is an offence under the Crimes Act 2016, Division 7.3 to engage in sexual intercourse with a person under the age of 16. Consent is not a defence unless the younger party was aged 13 years or older and the offender was not more than 2 years older than the younger person.

== New Caledonia (France) ==
New Caledonia has a civil law system based on French law; the 1988 Matignon Accords grant substantial autonomy to the islands.

== New Zealand ==
It is an offence in New Zealand to have a sexual connection with a person under the age of 16. It is a defence if due diligence had been undertaken by the defendant to ascertain the victim's age, had reasonable grounds to believe the victim was aged 16 or over and consent was given. Further it is an offence for a person to have a sexual connection with a person under the age of 18 if the defendant is in a guardianship role (parent, stepparent, foster parent, guardian, uncle, aunt or other members of extended family and friends, or other power or authority or responsibility for care or upbringing). The age of consent for girls had earlier been 12 years, and was progressively raised to 16 years in the late 19th century.

The age of consent for prostitution in New Zealand is higher. Although prostitution is legal, under the Prostitution Reform Act 2003 it is illegal to procure or receive sexual services from any person under 18.

New Zealand has had a uniform and equal age of consent of 16, regardless of sexual orientation and/or gender since the passage of the Homosexual Law Reform Act 1986.

Contraceptives in New Zealand are not age-restricted and are available to people under 16. A teen 12 years or older can be prosecuted for a consensual relationship with a teen under 16 (both parties if both are 12 years or older), although this is extremely rare. Even with a complaint, it is still up to police discretion and if the age difference is small it is rarely prosecuted, with family group conferences being the more likely option. There was an attempt to formalise this under law in 2004, however, this was abandoned after a public outcry. Before 2005, there was no law in New Zealand prohibiting any form of sexual relationship between adult women and male minors.

The sexual abuse of boys of any age, including rape, by adult women was fully legal in New Zealand until 2005. This is despite New Zealand having been party to international conventions against the exploitation of children since the 1980s. In 2003, swimming instructor Stacey Margaret Friel, 21, was reported to have had sex with a 13-year-old boy, but faced no charges at the time due to the lack of laws against sexual abuse of boys by women. Since the loophole in the laws was closed there have been a number of cases of women being prosecuted for sexual abuse of young boys, including a woman who gave birth to the child of an 11-year-old boy whom she had allegedly raped.

=== Tokelau ===
The age of consent is 16. Section 19 of the Crimes, Procedures and Evidence Rules, 2003 (CPER) reads: "1) A person who has carnal knowledge of another — [..] (i) (II) if the victim is under the age of 16 years, whether the victim consented or not [...] commits an offence." Section 21 reads: "(1) A person who indecently assaults another commits an offence. (2) Where the victim is a mental defective or under the age of 16 years it is no defence to a charge under this rule that the person consented to the offence, or that the person charged believed that the person assaulted was sane or not under the age of 16 years as the case may be."

== Niue ==
The age of consent in Niue is 15. This is established by article 164 of the penal code. Anal sex (buggery) was illegal but was decriminalized in 2024.

Niue Act 1966

== Okinotori Islands (Japan) ==
The Okinotori Islands are administratively under the government of Tokyo.

== Palau ==
The age of consent in Palau is 17. There is a close-in-age exemption allowing 15 and 16 year-olds to have sex with partners less than 5 years older. Article § 1602 reads: a) A person commits the offense of sexual assault in the first degree if: (...) (3) The person knowingly engages in sexual penetration with a person who is at least fifteen years old but less than seventeen years old; provided that: (A) The person is not less than five years older than the minor; and (B) The person is not legally married to the minor".

== Papua New Guinea ==
In Papua New Guinea it is unlawful to have carnal knowledge of a girl under the age of 16. If the victim is aged 12 or more, it is a defence if the defendant "believed, on reasonable grounds" that the girl was aged 16 or older. It is a crime for any person to indecently deal with a boy under the age of 14 (section 211), and boys under the age of 17 are not deemed able to consent to acts by another male that, but for their consent, would be indecent assaults (section 243). Also having or allowing carnal knowledge "against the order of nature" is illegal at any age, as are acts of "gross indecency" between males (sections 210 and 212).

== Samoa ==
The age of consent in Samoa is 16, per Section 59. Sexual conduct with young person under 16, of the Crime Act 2013. Homosexual acts are illegal regardless of age (Section 67. Sodomy).

== Solomon Islands ==
The age of consent in the Solomon Islands is 15 (sections 141, 142 & 143), but homosexual sex is illegal at all ages (sections 160, 161 & 162). Further, section 140 prohibits taking a girl under 18 out of the care of her parents or guardian for the purpose of sexual intercourse, while section 144 prohibits procuring a girl under 18 for sexual intercourse.

== Tonga ==
The age of consent in Tonga is 15.

- Section 121

Carnal knowledge of child or young person [...] (2) Any person who carnally knows any young person under the age of 15 years shall be liable on conviction thereof to imprisonment for 5 years

- Section 124

Indecent assault [...] (5) A young person under the age of 15 years cannot in law give any consent which would prevent an act being an indecent assault for the purposes of this section.

== Tuvalu ==
The age of consent in Tuvalu is 15 (sections 133, 134 & 135), but homosexual sex is illegal at all ages (sections 153, 154 & 155). Further, section 132 prohibits taking a girl under 18 out of the care of her parents or guardian for the purpose of sexual intercourse, while section 136 prohibits procuring a girl under 18 for sexual intercourse.

== United States (Hawaii and Pacific territories) ==
Ages of consent in the United States, including Hawaii and the following Oceania territories: Guam, CNMI, and American Samoa 16 17 18 No data available / other

=== Hawaii ===
The age of consent in Hawaii is 16 years old. There is however a close-in-age exemption, which allows consent to sex from age 14 with those no more than 21 years old.

Previously the age of consent was 14, the lowest in the United States. Avery Chumbley, a member of the Hawaiian Senate, had made efforts to raise the age of consent since 1996. The age of consent was changed to 16 by Act 1, House Bill 236, passed by the Legislature of Hawaii in 2001.

Hawaii first established age of consent for contact/penetration as 10/14 years old in 1869 which lasted until 1912. The legal status from 1913 to 1924 is unclear, but by 1925 it was set to the higher numbers of 12/16. In both sets of laws these penalties only penalized males contacting females. In 1974 the laws were changed to add the additional requirement that there was a "reckless infliction" of "serious" bodily harm. This requirement was removed in 1986 and the wording was changed to apply to persons of any gender, not only males.

=== American Samoa ===
It is an offence in American Samoa to engage in sexual acts with a person under the age of 16.

=== Guam ===
The age of consent in Guam is 16.

§ 25.25. Third Degree Criminal Sexual Conduct.

(a) A person over 21 is guilty of criminal sexual conduct in the third degree if the person engages in sexual penetration with another person and if any of the following circumstances exists:

(1) that other person is at least fourteen (14) years of age and under sixteen (16) years of age (...)

=== Northern Mariana Islands ===
The age of consent in the Northern Mariana Islands is 16, according to Title 6, Sections 1306–1309 of the Commonwealth Code. There a close-in-age exemption permitting minors aged 13–15 to engage in sexual activity with those less than three years older. Under the same provisions, it is also illegal for any person aged 16 or older to aid, encourage, induce or causes minors under 13 to engage in any sexual activity, or minors aged 13–15 to engage in sexual activity with persons older than them by three years or more.

The age of consent rises to 18 when the older partner – being age 18 or older – is the parent, stepparent, adopted parent, or legal guardian of the younger person, or when the older partner has or occupies a position of authority over the younger person. This does not apply for minors aged 16 or 17 as long as the older partner is less than three years older and is not the younger person's parent, stepparent, adopted parent or legal guardian. According to section 1317, a position of authority "means an employer, youth leader, scout leader, coach, teacher, counselor, school administrator, religious leader, doctor, nurse, psychologist, guardian ad litem, babysitter, or a substantially similar position, and a police officer or probation officer other than when the officer is exercising custodial control" over a person under 18.

According to Section 1310, affirmative defenses for the crimes outlined in Sections 1306–1309 exists for consensual activity between legal spouses and for cases where the defendant reasonably believed that a minor age 13 or older was of legal age.

Sections 1303 and 1304 of the Commonwealth Code also criminalize sexual activity with persons aged 18 or 19, if they are "committed to the custody of the Department of Public Health and Environmental Services under the Commonwealth's civil or criminal laws, and the offender is the legal guardian of the person".

=== Pacific Remote Islands Marine National Monument ===
Baker Island, Howland Island, Jarvis Island, Johnston Atoll, Kingman Reef, Palmyra Atoll and Wake Island, are under the jurisdiction of the US federal government Department of the Interior, as part of the Pacific Islands Heritage Marine National Monument. As such, all US federal laws regarding age of consent would be applicable.

=== Midway Atoll ===
Midway Atoll is under the jurisdiction of the US federal government Department of the Interior (administered as a National Wildlife Refuge). As such, all US federal laws regarding age of consent would be applicable.

== Vanuatu ==
Since 1 January 2007 under the Criminal Consolidation Act 2006, the age of consent on Vanuatu is 15 for heterosexual conduct and 18 for homosexual conduct. Article 97 reads: (...) (2) No person shall have sexual intercourse with any child under the age of 15 years but of or over the age of 13 years. (3) It is no defence to a charge under this section that the child consented or that the person charged believed that the child was of or over the age in question. Article 99 reads: No person shall commit any homosexual act with a person of the same sex under 18 years of age, whether or not that person consents.

== Wallis and Futuna (France) ==
The laws of France where applicable apply.

== See also ==
- Age-of-consent reform
- Age of consent
- Age of consent by country
- Ages of consent in Africa
- Ages of consent in Asia
- Ages of consent in Europe
- Ages of consent in North America
- Ages of consent in South America
- Comprehensive sex education
- LGBT rights in Oceania
- Sex education
