= Age of consent in Africa =

Legal age for sexual consent in Africa

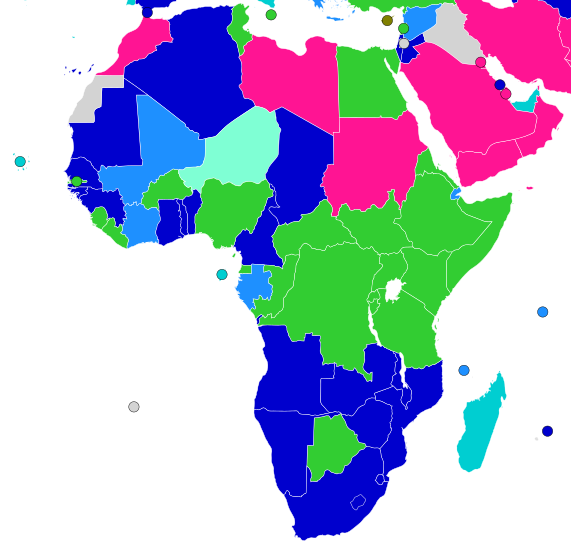
Age of consent for heterosexual sex in Africa 13 14 15 16 17 18 must be married no data available

The age of consent in Africa for sexual activity varies by jurisdiction across the continent, codified in laws which may also stipulate the specific activities that are permitted or the gender of participants for different ages. Other variables may exist, such as close-in-age exemptions.

Three nations in Africa (Gabon, Ivory Coast, and Madagascar) have a higher age of consent for same-sex sexual relations than opposite-sex ones; every other African country either has an equal age of consent for both acts or bans homosexual acts altogether regardless of age.

The highlighted age refers to an age at or above which an individual can engage in unfettered sexual relations with another person who is also at or above that age. Other variables are stated when relevant.

== Summary ==
All jurisdictions per list of sovereign states and dependent territories in Africa.

=== Definitions ===
- Restricted by age difference: younger partner is deemed able to consent to having sex with an older one as long as their age difference does not exceed a specified amount. This column shows the younger partner's age of consent under these rules, not the age difference.
- Restricted by authority: younger partner is deemed able to consent to having sex with any older partner, so long as said older partner is not in a legally recognised position of trust or authority, which the latter is abusing over the former.
- Unrestricted: age from which one is deemed able to consent to having sex with anyone else at or above the age of consent or the marriageable age if they must be married.

== Algeria ==
The age of consent in Algeria is 16 for vaginal intercourse, as specified in Article 334 of the penal code.

"Heterosexual Sodomy" is illegal, Article 338 of the Penal Code. As well as all same-sex sexual conduct, Article 338, and "outrages to public decency", Article 333. The punishment for both the first two activities with those under 19 years of age is more severe for the older participant.

== Angola ==
The age of consent in Angola is 14 but sexual activity with a person under 16 is prohibited if an adult "takes advantage of their inexperience or a situation of particular need".

These laws are covered under articles 192 and 193 of the penal code—sexual abuse of a minor under 14, and sexual abuse of a minor under 16.

Some online sources incorrectly list the age of consent as 12, but article 192 criminalizes all sexual acts with persons under 14 (penalties are aggravated if there is penetration or if the victim is under 12).

A new penal code which came into effect in February 2021 adds protections for sexual orientation and removes criminalizing “vices against nature”, which had been used to criminalize same-sex sexual activity.

== Benin ==
The age of consent in Benin is 16 for females, per Article 3 of The Law on the Prevention and Punishment of Violence against Women.

The age of consent for homosexual acts ("indecent acts or acts against nature") is 16 since 2018.

== Botswana ==
The age of consent is 18, as of the Penal Code Amendment Bill 2018. Same-sex relationships have been legal since 2019.

== Burkina Faso ==
The age of consent is equally set at 18.

Section 533-4 of the penal code criminalizes "indecent assaults" against minors at least 15 but less than 18.

Section 533-19 makes it illegal to incite to debauchery or promote the corruption of minors.

Since 2025, homosexual acts were criminalized.

== Burundi ==
Under the new Penal Code of 2009 (in French), the age of consent in Burundi for heterosexuals (both men and women) is 18 years. However, under Article 567, homosexual acts (both men and women) carry a fine of up to 100,000 Burundian francs and up to 3 years' imprisonment.

== Cameroon ==
The minimum age of consent in Cameroon is 16, as specified in article 346 of the 2016 penal code.

However, article 344 of the same code states; "Whoever, in order to satisfy the desires of another person, habitually excites, encourages or facilitates the debauch or corruption of any person under (?) years of age...".

This appears subjective as to what acts, in what situations, may be considered to encourage debauchery or corruption (when involving minors aged 16 or above). An additional concern—and the reason for the question mark above—is that the original French version of the text lists the age of persons who may not be corrupted as those "under 21" (the age of majority in Cameroon), but the English version lists the age as "under 18".

== Cape Verde ==
The age of consent in Cape Verde is 14 regardless of sexual orientation and/or gender, with partial protections for those under age 16.

Sexual relations with a child under age 14 are considered a public crime and invoke mandatory reporting from anyone who becomes aware of the crime.

Article 144 of the penal code makes it illegal to engage in sexual acts with persons younger than 14.

Article 145 makes it illegal to engage in sexual acts with a 14- to 15-year-old if, being an adult, the offender takes advantage of their superiority (power or control) in the relationship, or if the victim is entrusted to them for education or assistance.

== Central African Republic ==
The minimum age of sexual consent is 18 years of age regardless of gender. This is established in the Penal Code under chapter 5, Article 86 (any indecent assault or attempt without violence).

Article 87 specifies that any indecent assault against a person younger than 15 is considered rape, and the punishment is more severe than in the previous article.

== Chad ==
The age of consent in Chad appears to be 16.

Article 359 of the 2017 penal code penalizes sexual relations with persons younger than 13 years with 2–10 years in prison.

Article 361 penalizes anyone who commits an indecent act in the presence of a person under 16 years of age. Penalties are aggravated if the act is committed with violence. The French wording of the article ("un outrage a la pudeur") can also be translated to indecent exposure, so it is not entirely clear from the text alone whether this applies to consensual acts committed with persons aged 13–15, or simply to acts committed in their presence without their involvement.

Article 354 proscribes 3 months to 2 years' imprisonment for sexual relations with a member of the same sex, thus making homosexuality illegal. Penalties are aggravated if a person involved is under 18 (Article 360).

Finally, Article 363 criminalizes anyone who excites, promotes, or facilitates the "debauchery" of anyone below the age of civil majority, which is 21 years in Chad.

== Congo (republic of the) ==
In the Republic of the Congo, the age of consent for heterosexual acts is 18 years old.

For homosexual acts, it is 21 years old, put in place by the 1947 penal code.

== Comoros ==
The age of consent in the Comoros is 18.

Article 301 of the penal code punishes any indecent assault (or attempt) irrefutably presumed as without consent against the person of a child of either sex under age 18.

Homosexuality is illegal (Article 300 of the penal code).

== Côte d'Ivoire ==
The minimum age of consent in Côte d'Ivoire for heterosexual sex is 15, regardless of gender.

This is specified in article 356 of the Penal Code, which states that an indecent act against a person under 15—without violence or coercion—will be penalized with 1–3 years' imprisonment.

However, there is also a law (article 337) that forbids "facilitating the corruption or debauchery of youth of either sex below the age of 18 years". What specific acts would run afoul of this law, and under what circumstances, are unclear. It is included in a section of violations against public morality alongside pimping, solicitation, and prostitution offenses.

The age of consent for homosexual activities is higher, being set at 18 by article 358 of the penal code.

== Democratic Republic of the Congo ==
The age of consent in the Democratic Republic of the Congo is 18, regardless of gender. This was established by the Law Relative to Sexual Violence (2006) and the Child Protection Act (2009).

== Djibouti ==
The age of consent is 15, but charges can also be applied to those aged 15–17 if the act "corrupts" or "incites the minor to debauchery".

There are 3 sections in the 1995 penal code that appear relevant.

Article 464 deals with sexual assault on a person under age 15 without violence or coercion, which sets a strict minimum age of 15.

Article 466 pertains to sexual assault on a minor over 15. However, this section only applies to guardians, people in a position of authority over the victim, or a person who abuses the authority conferred on him by his functions.

Article 162 refers to inciting to debauchery or promoting the corruption of a minor in organizing meetings involving sexual exhibitions or relations in which the minor participates or attends. This charge could be applied to those who engage in sexual activity with minors aged 15–17, though the requirements for "organizing meetings" are not specified.

A new penal code was published in 2011, but the age of consent was unchanged from 15.

== Egypt ==
The age of consent in Egypt is 18 years, for heterosexual males and females. This is outlined in article 269 of the penal code.

Sex work is illegal and the sex work law has been used against male and female homosexuals.

== Equatorial Guinea ==
The age of consent is 18 regardless of sexual orientation and/or gender.

== Eritrea ==
The age of consent in Eritrea appears to be 18, as stipulated by Article 305 of the 2015 penal code, "Sexual outrage on minors between 15 and 18 years of age". This article states that sexual acts with minors of this age is a petty offense punishable by 6–12 months' imprisonment.

Article 311 Consent to Sexual Conduct (1) states that when an accused is charged with an offense under the chapter (chapter 3: sexual offenses, which spans articles 303–311) pertaining to a victim under 15 years, it shall not be a defense that the victim consented, unless the accused is also under age 15 and no more than 1 year older than that person.

Article 311 (3) goes on to state that consent shall not be a defense to charges under articles 309 (homosexuality) or 310 (incest).

Charges pertaining to Article 305 are not mentioned, so it is unclear whether consent may be an affirmative defense to a charge pertaining to minors aged 15–17.

== Eswatini ==
The age of consent is 18, updated as of the SODV (sexual offenses and domestic violence) Act of 2018.

Part II General Sexual Offenses

Under the offense of rape, 3(c) states that an unlawful sexual act includes that which is committed against "a person who is incapable in law of appreciating the nature of the act"

6(e) lists one of the conditions that would render a person incapable as; "a person below the age of 18 years"

== Ethiopia ==
The minimum age for consensual sex is 18 years, as specified in Article 626 of the 2004 Criminal Code—sexual outrages on minor's between 13 and 18 years. Sexual intercourse is punishable with "rigorous imprisonment" for 3–15 years.

The law, however, is not effectively enforced; nearly 20% of girls are married by the age of 15. Early childhood marriage is especially common in rural areas, where some girls are married as young as 7 years old.

== French territories ==
The age of consent in Mayotte, Reunion and the French Southern and Antarctic Lands is 15 as they are under French sovereignty.

== Gabon ==
The minimum age of consent in Gabon is 15 for heterosexual activity and 21 for homosexual activity.

Charges can still apply in certain heterosexual situations involving minors aged 15–17.

Article 258 of the Penal Code (most recently amended in 1969) states that indecent assault without violence on a person under 15 years will be punished with 3–6 years' imprisonment. Whoever commits an indecent act or act against nature on a person of the same sex and under 21 years shall be imprisoned for 1–3 years.

Article 263 prescribes 1–5 years' imprisonment for anyone who "habitually" incites, promotes, or facilitates debauchery or corruption of persons of either sex below age 18. The wording of this article requires multiple acts for a crime to have taken place.

Punishments for other offenses (assault, rape, etc) are aggravated if the victim is younger than 15.

== Gambia ==
The age of consent is 18 for females.

Sexual Offenses Act of 2013, section 5: Defilement of a girl between the ages 16 and 18;

A person who unlawfully has carnal knowledge of a girl between the ages of 16 and 18 commits an offence and is liable on conviction to imprisonment not exceeding 7 years.

It is a defense if the offender had a reasonable belief that the girl in question was 18 or older.

The legal age for non-penetrative sexual contact may be 16. Section 5 requires "carnal knowledge", but section 3 (rape) applies to "sexual acts", which are defined much more broadly and include "any form of genital stimulation", committed against those under age 16.

Section 5 also only applies to female victims, setting the age of consent for males at 16.

== Ghana ==
The age of consent is 16, established in Section 101 (defilement of a child under 16 years of age) of the 1960 Criminal Code.

== Guinea ==
The age of consent is 16.

Article 272 of the penal code states that any indecent act committed without violence against a child of either sex under age 16 is punishable by imprisonment for 3–10 years.

The same punishment applies to indecent acts against minors aged 16–17 if they are committed by an ascendant and the minor is not emancipated by marriage.

Article 355 criminalizes anyone who "habitually" offends against morals by inciting debauchery or promoting the corruption of minors.

== Guinea-Bissau ==
As of the 1993 Penal Code, the minimum age of consent appears to be 12 regardless of sexual orientation and/or gender.

However, additional protections are in place for those under 16 years of age. Article 134 of the code states (approximate translation) that those who practice copulation with females older than 12 but younger than 16 by "taking advantage of their inexperience" are guilty of sexual abuse, punishable by 2 to 8 years' imprisonment, or 1 to 5 years for "significant sexual acts" with males or females not amounting to copulation. The article also applies to anyone who takes advantage of a person's temporary or permanent physical or mental impairment, but that clause applies regardless of the victim's age.

The third and final paragraph states that if the agent—WITHOUT resorting to violence, serious threat or coercion (the presence of any of those conditions could be charged as rape under Article 133)—engages in copulation or a significant sexual act with a female person, or the latter with a male person, 12 years of age or less, it is presumed, until it is well founded, that he has taken advantage of the victim's incapacity for sexual determination and is punishable by imprisonment of between two and ten years.

== Kenya ==
The age of consent in Kenya is 18.

Homosexuality in Kenya is illegal and punishable with 14 to 21 years in prison.

== Lesotho ==
The age of consent is 18 years, regardless of sexual orientation and/or gender.

This is confirmed by articles 48 (indecency with children) and 49 (unlawful sexual intercourse with children) of the Penal Code Act, 2010. A child is defined by the code as anyone under age 18, and both articles specify that consent is irrelevant.

== Liberia ==
The age of consent in Liberia is 18, if the offender is 18 or above. Statutory rape is a first-degree rape offense which carries a maximum sentence of life imprisonment. The age of consent was raised to 18, from 16, in 2009.

Homosexuality is illegal (penal code 14.74 Voluntary Sodomy).

14.75 Corruption of Minors specifies a 5-year "close in age" exception for sexual intercourse when the minor is under age 16, but this would be superseded by the revised rape statute for offenses on or after January 16, 2006 (when the older person is at least 18 years of age).

The age of consent for non-penetrative sexual contact is 16, with the same 5-year exception;

14.77 Sexual Assault A person who knowingly has sexual contact with another person or causes such other to have sexual contact with him or her, when they are not married to each other has committed a second degree misdemeanor if...

(C) the other person is less than 12 years of age, provided the actor is 16 years of age or older...

(G) the other person is less than 16 years of age and the actor is at least 5 years older than the other person

== Libya ==
During the Gaddafi government, the regular age of consent was 18, but 16-year-old girls could be married as long as the parents consented.

After the 2011 revolution, the age of consent limit was removed. Presently, there is no defined age of consent, although sex is not allowed outside of marriage. However, the law is practically never enforced due to the Libyan Civil War.

== Madagascar ==
Age of consent is 14 years, according to article 331 in the Criminal Law. In certain cases, including relatives and homosexuals, it is 21 years.

== Malawi ==
The age of consent for heterosexual sex is 16 regardless of gender.

It was raised from 13 to 16 via an Amendment to the penal code in 2011. The relevant articles are 138 (dealing with sexual intercourse) and 160 (any other sexual contact).

== Mali ==
The age of consent is set at 15, regardless of gender and/or sexual orientation.

Article 225 of the updated 2001 Penal Code states that indecent assault committed against a child under age 15 without violence is punishable by 5–10 years' imprisonment.

Indecent acts with minors at least 15 but under 21 without violence are illegal if the offender is an ascendant, a person in a position of authority (such as an employer), or a person responsible for education or supervision.

== Mauritania ==
The age of consent is 18.

Code of Judicial Protection of Children, 2005

Article 1: For the purposes of this Ordinance, every human being under 18 years is a child and shall be registered immediately after birth

Article 26: Sexual assault other than rape is punishable by two to four years' imprisonment and 120,000 to 160,000 ouguiyas fine when committed against a child.

Acts of sexual touching of any nature whatsoever, committed against a child constitutes the crime of pedophilia and sentenced to 5 years' imprisonment and a fine of 200,000 ouguiyas.

However, under section 306 of the Legal Code, any act that violates Islamic morality is illegal, but a clear definition of morality does not exist in the country's laws, so it is very open to interpretation by local officials as to what is moral and what is not. Thus, many acts surrounding the age of consent could be considered illegal. The same article punishes any "indecent assault" with penalties of 1 month to 2 years' imprisonment, but indecent assault is not clearly defined either.

Section 307 (zina) criminalizes all premarital sex, but it only applies to Muslims.

== Mauritius ==
The age of consent in Mauritius is 16 regardless of sexual orientation and/or gender.

Article 249 'Rape, attempt upon chastity and illegal sexual intercourse' of the Penal Code:

(...) Any person who has sexual intercourse with a female 'under the age of sixteen (16), even with consent, shall be liable to penal servitude not exceeding ten (10) years.

== Madeira (Portugal) ==
The age of consent in Madeira is 14 years, regardless of sexual orientation and/or gender, as it is under Portuguese sovereignty.

== Morocco ==
Premarital sex is illegal in Morocco, with punishment of 1 month to 1 year's imprisonment (Penal Code Article 490).

The legal age for marriage is 18, and Art. 484 of the Penal Code provides harsher penalties (2–5 years) for committing sexual acts without violence on a victim younger than 18.

== Mozambique ==
The age of consent in Mozambique is 16, regardless of sexual orientation and/or gender, as specified by the 2019 Penal Code.

Article 203 of which prohibits sexual acts (with or without violence) with a person under 16 years of age, while Article 202 provides for lengthier sentences for offences committed against children under the age of 12. The relevant sections (as translated) reading as follows:

Article 202

(Sexual intercourse with a child under 12 years of age)

Whoever has sexual intercourse with a child under 12 years of age shall be punished with imprisonment for 16 to 20 years.

Article 203

(Other sexual acts with minors)

1. Whoever, by means of violence or serious threat, performs a sexual act with a person under 16 years of age, or causes that person to have such an act performed with another person, shall be sentenced to imprisonment for 8 to 12 years.

2. Where the violence is not proven, the penalty shall be imprisonment for 2 to 8 years and a fine of up to one year.

Article 204 also increases penalties for sexual harassment where the individual offended against is under 16 years of age, while Article 210 provides for the barring of individuals convicted of offences against persons under 16 from custodial roles, for a period of between 1-5 years.

== Namibia ==
The age of consent is 16 for girls.

'Sexual offences with girls under sixteen (16) years', Section 14 of the 'Combating of Immoral Practices Act 1980'

'(1) Any male who

a) has or attempts to have unlawful carnal intercourse with a girl under the age of sixteen (16) years; or

b) commits or attempts to commit with such a girl an immoral or indecent act;

c) solicits or entices such a girl to the commission of an immoral or indecent act, -shall be guilty of an offence and liable on conviction to imprisonment for a period not exceeding six years with or without a fine not exceeding three thousand rand in addition to such imprisonment.

(2) It shall be a sufficient defence to any charge in terms of this section if it appears to the court:

a) that the girl at the time of the commission of the offence was a prostitute, that the person so charged was at the said time under the age of twenty-one (21) years and that it is the first occasion on which he is so charged; or

b) that the person who charged was at the said time under the age of sixteen (16) years; and

c) that the girl or person in whose charge she was, deceived the person so charged into believing that she was over the age of sixteen (16) years at the said time.'

== Niger ==
In Niger, the age of consent is set at 13 years for heterosexuals.

This is specified by Article 278 and Article 282 of the country's penal code.

Article 293 prohibits anyone from "habitually arousing, favoring, or facilitating the debauchery or corruption of the youth of either sex under 21 years". This article is listed along with other articles relating to prostitution offenses, and it is unclear what circumstances would be considered "debauchery".

Homosexuality has been criminalized since 2026, as the 2026 penal code includes several provisions targeting sexual and gender diversity and criminalises same-sex sexual acts.

== Nigeria ==
The Child's Rights Act of 2003 sets the age of consent at 18 (in 24 out of 36 Nigerian States).

Homosexuality is illegal.

== Republic of the Congo ==
The age of consent in the Republic of the Congo is 18 regardless of gender. Sex with a minor is punishable by up to 5 years in prison and a fine of 10,000,000 CFA.

== Rwanda ==
The age of consent in Rwanda is 18 years, regardless of sexual orientation and/or gender.

== Sahrawi Arab Democratic Republic ==
The age of consent in the Sahrawi Arab Democratic Republic is 13 regardless of sexual orientation and/or gender.

== São Tomé and Príncipe ==
The age of consent in São Tomé and Príncipe is 14 years, regardless of sexual orientation and/or gender.

This is specified in article 175 of the Penal Code. Article 177 prohibits sexual activity with 14- and 15-year-olds if access is gained by "abusing his/her inexperience", while Article 178 establishes the age of consent for homosexual sex to be 16.

== Senegal ==
The age of consent in Senegal is 16 (Article 320 deals with children under 16; Article 319 deals with children under 13). Homosexual sex is illegal.

== Seychelles ==
The age of consent is 15 regardless of gender. The legislation reads as follows:

CHAPTER XV – Offences Against Morality

Sexual assault

130. (1) A person who sexually assaults another person is guilty of an offence and liable to imprisonment for 20 years:

Provided that where the victim of such assault is under the age of 15 years and the accused is of or above the age of 18 years and such assault falls under subsection (2)(c) or (d), the person shall be liable to imprisonment for a term not less than 14 years and not more than 20 years:

Provided also that if the person is convicted of a similar offence within a period of 10 years from the date of the first conviction the person shall be liable to imprisonment for a period not less than 28 years:

Provided further that where it is the second or a subsequent conviction of the person for an assault referred to in subsection (2)(d) on a victim under 15 years within a period of ten years from the date of the conviction, the person shall be liable to imprisonment for life.

(2) For the purposes of this section "sexual assault" includes:

(a) an indecent assault;

(b) the non-accidental touching of the sexual organ of another;

(c) the non-accidental touching of another with one's sexual organ, or

(d) the penetration of a body orifice of another for a sexual purpose.

(3) A person does not consent to an act which if done without consent constitutes an assault under this section if-

(a) the person's consent was obtained by misrepresentation as to the character of the act of the identity of the person doing the act;

(b) the person is below the age of fifteen years; or

(c) the person's understanding and knowledge are such that the person was incapable of giving consent.

Sexual interference with a child

135. (1) A person who commits an act of indecency towards another person who is under the age of fifteen years is guilty of an offence and liable to imprisonment for 20 years:

...(2) A person is not guilty of an offence under this section if at the time of the offence the victim of the act of indecency was-

(a) fourteen years old or older and the accused had reasonable ground to believe that the victim was over fifteen years old; or

(b) the spouse of the accused.

Section 135 amended by Act 5 of 2012 with effect from 6 August 2012.

According to the U.S. State Department, the Seychelles age of consent is "traditionally understood" to be 15 but that the country's statutes "fail to clearly define the ages of consent and legal majority"; according to the State Department this causes confusion in regards to the "traditionally understood" age of consent and the age of majority of 18 and therefore complicates enforcement of the law.

== Sierra Leone ==
The age of consent is 18 regardless of sexual orientation and/or gender, under the Sexual Offenses Act 2012.

== Somalia ==
The Sexual Offenses Bill (2018) amended the existing penal code and established the age of consent to be 18 years.

== South Africa ==
The age of consent in South Africa is 16 regardless of sexual orientation or gender, as specified by sections 15 and 16 of the Criminal Law (Sexual Offences and Related Matters) Amendment Act, 2007. Section 15 ("statutory rape") prohibits the commission of "an act of sexual penetration with a child who is 12 years of age or older but under the age of 16 years", while section 16 ("statutory sexual assault") prohibits the commission of "an act of sexual violation with a child who is 12 years of age or older but under the age of 16 years". The law includes a close-in-age exception, so that sexual acts between two children where both are between 12 and 16, or where one is under 16 and the other is less than two years older, are not criminal. There is a conclusive legal presumption that children under the age of 12 are not able to consent, so any sexual act with a child under that age constitutes rape or sexual assault.

=== History ===
Under the Roman-Dutch common law there was a conclusive presumption that girls under the age of 12 were unable to consent to sexual intercourse. This presumption can be traced back to the "old authorities" of the 17th century.

The Girls' and Mentally Defective Women's Protection Act, 1916, which replaced the differing age of consent laws of the four colonies that formed the Union of South Africa, criminalised sexual intercourse between a man and a girl under the age of 16 unless they were married. This act was replaced by a similar prohibition in section 14 of the Immorality Act, 1957. Although sex between men was already illegal, prohibited by the common law as "sodomy" or "unnatural sexual acts", the Immorality Act also criminalised sexual intercourse between a man and a boy under 16.

The Immorality Amendment Act, 1969, which was enacted in response to a national moral panic over homosexuality, raised to 19 the age below which the Immorality Act prohibited sex between males. The Immorality Amendment Act, 1988 inserted mirror provisions applying to women, prohibiting intercourse between a woman and a boy under 16 or a girl under 19. It also renamed the Immorality Act to the Sexual Offences Act, 1957.

The Interim Constitution, which came into force in 1994, prohibited discrimination on the basis of sexual orientation, as does the final Constitution which replaced in 1997. As a result, the Constitutional Court struck down the laws prohibiting homosexual sex in the 1998 case of National Coalition for Gay and Lesbian Equality v Minister of Justice. That case did not, however, address the difference between the heterosexual and homosexual ages of consent in section 14 of the Sexual Offences Act.

In the Criminal Law (Sexual Offences and Related Matters) Amendment Act, 2007, Parliament reformed and codified the law on sexual offences and made it gender-neutral. The common-law presumption relating to girls under 12 was replaced by a general presumption that children under 12 cannot consent. The act also fixed the age of consent at 16 for all sexual acts. In the 2008 case of Geldenhuys v National Director of Public Prosecutions, the Constitutional Court held that the former difference in the ages of consent had been unconstitutional.

== South Sudan ==
The age of consent in South Sudan is 18.

== Spanish territories ==
The age of consent in the Canary Islands, Ceuta, Melilla and the plazas de soberanía is 16 regardless of sexual orientation and/or gender, as of 1 July 2015, as they are under Spanish sovereignty.

== Saint Helena, Ascension and Tristan da Cunha (United Kingdom) ==
Age of sexual consent is 16, regardless of sexual orientation and/or gender.

== Sudan ==
Sexual intercourse outside of marriage is against the law in Sudan.

== Tanzania ==
The age of consent is 18 in Tanzania, as specified in article 130 of the penal code.

== Togo ==
As of the 2015 penal code, the age of consent in Togo is considered to be 15.

Art. 224: paedophilia is any sexual intercourse or touching, of any kind, committed by a person over the age of majority, without fraud, threats, coercion or violence, against a child under the age of fifteen (15) years, or any exhibition or exploitation for commercial or tourist purposes of photographs, images and sound obtained by any technical process, pornographic films or drawings depicting one or more children under the age of fifteen (15) years.

Article 389 increases the penalties for indecent assault when committed against a child, but does not specify any particular age at which consent is negated.

Art. 389: anyone guilty of indecent assault shall be punished by imprisonment of one (1) to three (3) years and a fine of one million (1,000,000) to three million (3,000,000) CFA francs or both.

Indecent assault on a child shall be punishable by a term of imprisonment of between three (3) and five (5) years and a fine of between three million and five million CFA francs. If the indecent assault was committed with violence or threats against the person of a child, the penalties are five (5) to ten (10) years of rigorous imprisonment and a fine of two million (2 million) to ten million (10 million) CFA francs

== Tunisia ==
The age of consent in Tunisia is 18

Law 58 (the elimination of violence against women), which came into effect in 2018, raised the age threshold for rape charges under penal code article 227 from 13 to 16 years. A child younger than 16 is considered automatically incapable of consent.

However, Article 227 bis was also amended, and now prescribes 5 years' imprisonment for a sexual act committed on a minor between 16 and 18 years of age (whereas it previously applied to anyone aged 15–20).

Consent does not appear to be a defense; the punishment is simply reduced if the minor is at least 16 years of age.

Article 230 criminalizes sodomy.

== Uganda ==
The age of consent in Uganda is 18 years, for vaginal intercourse. "Heterosexual sodomy" (anal and/or oral sex with an opposite-sex partner) and all same-sex sexual conduct are illegal.

== Zambia ==
The age of consent for intercourse ("carnal knowledge") is 16, per article 138 of the penal code.

Article 137 reads in part as follows:

(1) Any person who unlawfully and indecently assaults any woman or girl is guilty of a felony and is liable to imprisonment for fourteen years. (2) It shall be no defence to a charge for an indecent assault on a girl under the age of twelve years to prove that she consented to the act of indecency: Provided that it shall be a sufficient defence to any charge under this subsection if it shall be made to appear to the court before whom the charge shall be brought that the person so charged had reasonable cause to believe, and did in fact believe, that the girl was of or above the age of twelve years.

== Zimbabwe ==
The age of consent in Zimbabwe is 18. It was raised in 2022 from a previous age of 16, which had in turn been raised from 12.

All male same-sex hand-holding and/or male same-sex sexual conduct can lead to one year's imprisonment. Same-sex hand-holding is illegal.

Article 70 of the penal code (Sexual intercourse or performing indecent acts with young persons), in combination with article 61 which defines “young person” as “boy or girl under the age of sixteen years”. Article 64 specifies that if the victim is under 12 years old the charge shall be rape. In May 2022, the Constitutional Court struck down the provision setting the age of consent at 16, and set the new and current age of consent at 18.

== See also ==
- Age-of-consent reform
- Age of consent
- Age of consent by country
- Ages of consent in Asia
- Ages of consent in Europe
- Ages of consent in North America
- Ages of consent in Oceania
- Ages of consent in South America
- Comprehensive sex education
- LGBT rights in Africa
- Sex education
