= Age of consent by country =

The age of consent is the age at which a person is considered to be legally competent to consent to sexual acts and is thus the minimum age of a person who is with whom another person is legally permitted to engage in sexual activity. The distinguishing aspect of the age of consent laws is that the person below the minimum age is regarded as the victim, and their sex partner is regarded as the offender, unless both are underage.

== Definitions ==
- Restricted by age difference: younger partner is deemed able to consent to having sex with an older one as long as their age difference does not exceed a specified amount. This column shows the younger partner's age of consent under these rules, not the age difference.
- Restricted by authority: younger partner is deemed able to consent to having sex with any older partner, so long as said older partner is not in a legally recognised position of trust or authority, which the latter is abusing over the former.
- Unrestricted: age from which one is deemed able to consent to having sex with anyone else at or above the age of consent or the marriageable age if they must be married.

The data below reflects what each jurisdiction's legislation actually means, rather than what it states on the surface.

== By country ==
Column headings explained (hover for details): "By age": Restricted by age difference. "By authority": Restricted by authority between partners. "Unrestricted": No restrictions after this age.

Ages of consent by country, sex, sex difference, age difference, and authority between partners.
Countries and states	Region	Must be married	By age				By authority				Unrestricted				Ref.
Countries and states	Region	Must be married	Hetero		Homo		Hetero		Homo		Hetero		Homo		Ref.
Countries and states	Region	Must be married	M	F	M	F	M	F	M	F	M	F	M	F	Ref.
China	Asia	No	—				—				14				
Japan	Asia	No	13				16				18				
Germany	Europe	No	—				14				18				
United Kingdom	Europe	No	—				16				18				
France	Europe	No	—				15				18				
India	Asia	No	—				—				18				
Italy	Europe	No	13				14				16				
Brazil	South America	No	—				—				14				
Canada	North America	No	12-15				16				18				
South Korea	Asia	No	13				—				16				
Russia	Europe	No	—				—				16				
Spain	Europe	No	—				16				18				
Indonesia	Asia	No	—				—				18				
Netherlands	Europe	No	—				16				18				
Turkey	Europe	No	—				—				18				
Switzerland	Europe	No	—				—				16				
Saudi Arabia	Asia	Yes	—				—				18		—		
Sweden	Europe	No	—				15				18				
Nigeria	Africa	No	—				—				18		—		
Poland	Europe	No	—				15				18				
Argentina	South America	No	—				13				18				
Belgium	Europe	No	14				16				18				
Venezuela	South America	No	—				—				16				
Norway	Europe	No	—				—				16				
Austria	Europe	No	13				14				18				
Iran	Asia	Yes	—				15		13		18		15		
Thailand	Asia	No	14				15				18				
United Arab Emirates	Asia	No	—				—				18		—		
Colombia	South America	No	—				—				14				
South Africa	Africa	No	12				—				16				
Denmark	Europe	No	—				15				18				
Malaysia	Asia	No	—				16		—		18		—		
Singapore	Asia	No	—				16				18				
Israel	Asia	No	14				—				16				
Philippines	Asia	No					16				18				
Egypt	Africa	No	10				13				18		—		
Hong Kong	Asia	No	—				—				16				
Finland	Europe	No	—				16				18				
Chile	South America	No	—				14				18				
Pakistan	Asia	Yes	—				—				18		—		
Ireland	Europe	No	—				—				17				
Greece	Europe	No	—				15				18				
Portugal	Europe	No	—				14				18				
Iraq	Asia	Yes	—				15				18				
Kazakhstan	Asia	No	—				—				16				
Algeria	Africa	No	—				—				16		—		
Qatar	Asia	Yes	—				—				18	16	—		
Czech Republic	Europe	No	—				15				18				
Peru	South America	No	—				14				18				
Romania	Europe	No	14				16				18				
New Zealand	Oceania	No	—				—				16				
Vietnam	Asia	No	—				—				16				
Bangladesh	Asia	No	—				—				16		—		
Kuwait	Asia	Yes	—				—				17	15	—		
Angola	Africa	No	—				14				16				
Hungary	Europe	No	12				14				18				
Ukraine	Europe	No	—				—				16				
Morocco	Africa	Yes	—				—				18		—		
Ecuador	South America	No	—				—				14				
Slovakia	Europe	No	—				—				15				
Cuba	Insular America	No	—				—				16				
Sudan	Africa	Yes	—				—				13	12	—		
Oman	Asia	Yes	—				—				18		—		
Belarus	Europe	No	—				—				16				
Azerbaijan	Asia	No	—				—				16				
Sri Lanka	Asia	No	—				—				16				
Myanmar	Asia	No	—				—				16				
Luxembourg	Europe	No	—				—				16				
Dominican Republic	Insular America	No	—				—				18				
Uzbekistan	Asia	No	—				—				16		—	16	
Kenya	Africa	No	—				—				18		—		
Guatemala	Central America	No	—				—				14				
Uruguay	South America	No	12				15				18				
Croatia	Europe	No	12				—				15				
Bulgaria	Europe	No	—				—				16				
Macau	Asia	No	—				—				14				
Ethiopia	Africa	No	—				—				18		—		
Lebanon	Asia	No	—				—				18				
Costa Rica	Central America	No	—				15				18				
Slovenia	Europe	No	—				—				15				
Panama	Central America	No	—				14				18				
Lithuania	Europe	No	—				16				18				
Tanzania	Africa	No	—				—				18		—		
Turkmenistan	Asia	No	—				—				16				
Tunisia	Africa	No	—				—				18		—		
Serbia	Europe	No	—				14				18				
Libya	Africa	Yes	—				—				18	16	—		
Ghana	Africa	No	—				—				16				
Yemen	Asia	Yes	—				—				—				
DR Congo	Africa	No	—				—				18				
Jordan	Asia	No	—				—				18				
Ivory Coast	Africa	No	—		—		15		—		18				
Bahrain	Asia	No	—				16 (married)				21 (unmarried)				
Bolivia	South America	No	—				14				18				
Cameroon	Africa	No	—		—		16		—		21		—		
Latvia	Europe	No	—				—				16				
Paraguay	South America	No	—				—				14		16		
Trinidad and Tobago	Insular America	No	—				—				18				
Uganda	Africa	No	—				—				18				
Zambia	Africa	No	—				—				16				
Estonia	Europe	No	—				16				18				
El Salvador	Central America	No	—				15				18				
Cyprus	Europe	No	—				—				17				
Afghanistan	Asia	Yes	—				—				18				
Honduras	Central America	No	—				14				18				
Nepal	Asia	No	—				—				18				
Bosnia and Herzegovina	Europe	No	—				15				18				
Gabon	Africa	No	15		—		—				18		21		
North Korea	Asia	No	—				—				15				
Brunei	Asia	Yes	—				—				16		—		
Mozambique	Africa	No	—				—				16				
Iceland	Europe	No	14				15				18				
Cambodia	Asia	No	—				—				15				
Equatorial Guinea	Africa	No	—				—				18				
Papua New Guinea	Oceania	No	12	14	—		—				16	17	—		
Georgia	Asia	No	—				—				16				
Botswana	Africa	No	—				—				18				
Senegal	Africa	No	—				—				16		—		
Zimbabwe	Africa	No	—				—				16		—		
Congo	Africa	No	—				—				18		—		
Jamaica	Insular America	No	—				—				16				
Namibia	Africa	No	—				—				16				
Albania	Europe	No	—				14				18				
Chad	Africa	No	—				—				16		—		
Burkina Faso	Africa	No	15		—		—				18		—		
Mauritius	Africa	No	—				—				16				
Mongolia	Asia	No	—				—				16				
Mali	Africa	No	—				—				15		—		
Nicaragua	Central America	No	—				16				18				
Laos	Asia	No	—				—				15				
North Macedonia	Europe	No	—				16				18				
South Sudan	Africa	No	—				—				18				
Armenia	Asia	No	—				—				16				
Madagascar	Africa	No	—				—				14		21		
Malta	Europe	No	—				—				16				
Benin	Africa	No	—				—				16				
Tajikistan	Asia	No	—				—				16				
Haiti	Insular America	No	—				—				15				
Bahamas	Insular America	No	—				—				16		18		
Niger	Africa	No	—				—				13		—		
Moldova	Europe	No	—				—				16				
Rwanda	Africa	No	—				—				18				
Kyrgyzstan	Asia	No	—				—				16				
Kosovo	Europe	No	—				—				16				
Monaco	Europe	No	—				—				15				
Guinea	Africa	No	—				—				15				
Liechtenstein	Europe	No	12				14				18				
Malawi	Africa	No	—				—				16				
Bermuda	Insular America	No	—				—				16				
Suriname	South America	No	—				—				16				
Mauritania	Africa	No	—				—				18		—		
Timor-Leste	Asia	No	—				—				14				
Sierra Leone	Africa	No	—				—				18				
Montenegro	Europe	No	—				14				18				
Togo	Africa	No	—				—				15				
Fiji	Oceania	No	—				—				16				
Eswatini	Africa	No	—				—				18		—		
Barbados	Insular America	No	—				—				16				
Eritrea	Africa	No	—				—				18				
Andorra	Europe	No	—				16				18				
Curaçao	South America	No	—				—				15				
Guyana	South America	No	—				—				16				
Maldives	Asia	Yes	—				—				18		—		
Burundi	Africa	No	—				—				18		—		
Aruba	South America	No	—				—				15				
Liberia	Africa	No	—				—				18		—		
Lesotho	Africa	No	—				—				18				
Bhutan	Asia	No	—				—				18				
Cape Verde	Africa	No	14				—				16				
San Marino	Europe	No	—				14				18				
Central African Republic	Africa	No	—				—				18				
Belize	Central America	No	—				—				16				
Djibouti	Africa	No	15		—		—				18		—		
Seychelles	Africa	No	—				—				15				
Saint Lucia	South America	No	—				—				16				
Somalia	Africa	No	—				—				18		—		
Antigua and Barbuda	South America	No	—				—				16				
Guinea-Bissau	Africa	No	—				—				16				
Gambia	Africa	No	—				—				16		18		
Samoa	Oceania	No	—				—				16				
Vanuatu	Oceania	No	—				15				18				
Comoros	Africa	No	—				—				15		—		
Dominica	South America	No	—				—				16		—		
São Tomé and Príncipe	Africa	No	—				14		—		16				
Kiribati	Oceania	No	—				—				15	18	—		
Tuvalu	Oceania	No	—				15				18				
Syria	Asia	No	—				—				15		—		
Taiwan	Asia	No	—				—				16				
Vatican City	Europe	No	—				—				18				
Gaza Strip	Asia	Yes	—				—				18		—		
West Bank	Asia	No	—				—				18				
Sahrawi Arab Democratic Republic	Africa	No	—				—				13				

== Governed by state or province ==
=== Australia ===
State/territory	By age	By authority	Unrestricted	Ref.
Australian Capital Territory	10	16	18	
New South Wales	14	16	17	
Northern Territory	—	16	18	
Queensland	—	—	16	
South Australia	16	17	18	
Tasmania	12	17	18	
Victoria	12	16	18	
Western Australia	13	16	18	

=== Mexico ===
Ages of consent in Mexico
Area	By age	By authority	Unrestricted	Ref.
Aguascalientes	12	—	16	120 118
Baja California	14	—	18	177, 182
Baja California Sur	12	—	18	286 290
Campeche	12	—	18	162 164
Chiapas	12	—	18	235 239
Chihuahua	14	—	18	172 177
Coahuila	12	—	16	229 235
Colima	14	—	18	146 148
Mexican Federal District	12	—	18	181 bis 180
Durango	14	—	18	177 181
Guanajuato	12	—	16	181 185
Guerrero	12	—	18	179 187
Hidalgo	12	—	18	180, 185
Jalisco	12	—	18	142-L, 142-M
México (state)	15	—	18	273 271
Michoacán	12	—	16	240 170
Morelos	12	—	18	154 159
Nayarit	Puberty	—	18	289, 291
Nuevo León	14	—	18	267 262
Oaxaca	12	—	18	247, 243
Puebla	12	—	18	264, 265, 272
Querétaro	12	—	18	161 167
Quintana Roo	12	—	18	127 130
San Luis Potosí	12	—	16	173 179
Sinaloa	12	—	18	180 184
Sonora	12	—	18	219 215
Tabasco	12	—	17	150 153
Tamaulipas	12	—	18	275 270
Tlaxcala	14	—	18	289 291
Veracruz	14	—	16	190 Quater 189
Yucatán	13	—	16	315 311
Zacatecas	13	—	18	237.1 237.4

=== United States ===
Ages of consent in the United States
State/territory	By age	By authority	Unrestricted	Ref.
Alabama	—N/a	16	19	
Alaska	—N/a	—N/a	18	
American Samoa	—N/a	—N/a	16	
Arizona	—N/a	—N/a	18	
Arkansas	14	16	18	
California	—N/a	—N/a	18	
Colorado	14	—N/a	17	
Connecticut	13	16	18	
Delaware	16	—N/a	18	
Florida	16	—N/a	18	
Georgia	—N/a	—N/a	16	
Hawaii	14	—N/a	16	
Idaho	—N/a	—N/a	18	
Illinois	—N/a	17	18	
Indiana	14	—N/a	16	
Iowa	14	—N/a	16	
Kansas	—N/a	—N/a	16	
Kentucky	16	—N/a	18	
Louisiana	—N/a	—N/a	17	
Maine	14	—N/a	16	
Maryland	14	16	18	
Massachusetts	—N/a	—N/a	16	
Michigan	—N/a	16	18	
Minnesota	13	16	18	
Mississippi	—N/a	—N/a	16	
Missouri	14	—N/a	17	
Montana	—N/a	—N/a	16	
Nebraska	—N/a	—N/a	16	
Nevada	—N/a	—N/a	16	
New Hampshire	13	16	18	
New Jersey	13	16	18	
New Mexico	13	16	18	
New York	—N/a	—N/a	17	
North Carolina	13	—N/a	16	
North Dakota	15	—N/a	18	
Northern Mariana Islands	13	16	18	
Ohio	13	16	18	
Oklahoma	16	18	20	
Oregon	—N/a	—N/a	18	
Pennsylvania	13	16	18	
Puerto Rico	—N/a	—N/a	16	
Rhode Island	14	—N/a	16	
South Carolina	14	—N/a	16	
South Dakota	—N/a	—N/a	16	
Tennessee	13	—N/a	18	
Texas	—N/a	17	18	
United States Virgin Islands	13	—N/a	18	
Utah	16	—N/a	18	
Vermont	15	16	18	
Virginia	15	—N/a	18	
Washington	—N/a	16	21	
Washington, D.C.	—N/a	16	18	
West Virginia	—N/a	—N/a	16	
Wisconsin	—N/a	—N/a	18	
Wyoming	—N/a	—N/a	17	

== See also ==
- Age of consent
  - Ages of consent in Africa
  - Ages of consent in Asia
  - Ages of consent in Europe
  - Ages of consent in North America
    - Ages of consent in the United States
  - Ages of consent in Oceania
  - Ages of consent in South America
- Age-of-consent reform
  - Age-of-consent reform in Canada
  - Age-of-consent reform in the United Kingdom
  - Age of Consent Act, 1891
  - French petition against age of consent laws
- Youth
  - Youth suffrage
  - Youth rights
- Legal age
  - Legal drinking age
  - Age of majority
  - Age of reason (canon law)
  - Age of criminal responsibility
  - Mature minor doctrine
  - Emancipation of minors
  - Fitness to plead, law of England and Wales
  - Minors and abortion
  - Convention on the Rights of the Child
  - Child sexual abuse
  - Sex-positive movement
  - Age disparity in sexual relationships
  - Comprehensive sex education
  - Adult film industry regulations
  - Sodomy law
  - The Maiden Tribute of Modern Babylon
