= Age of consent in North America =

Age of consent laws in North America. Age varies by state in the United States and Mexico.
12*
13*
14*
15*
16
17
18
*In Mexico, there are estupro laws regulating sex between adults and minors.

In North America, the legal age of consent relating to sexual activity outside of marriage varies by jurisdiction.

The age of consent in Canada is 16.

As of August 2018, each U.S. state has set its age of consent at either age 16, age 17, or age 18, most with some exceptions. In the case of the state of Washington, the age of consent rises to 21 for the specific instance student-teacher sex (the age of consent in the state of Washington is otherwise 16). In a number of U.S. states, the age of consent can drop to as low as 13, although this has associated specifications, usually regarding the age of those engaging in sexual acts not surpassing a specific age difference (known in the U.S. as "Romeo and Juliet laws" and elsewhere as close-in-age exceptions). As of April 2021, of the total fifty U.S. states, approximately thirty have an age of consent of 16 (with this being the most common age of consent in the country), a handful set the age of consent at 17, and in about eleven states the age is 18.

The age of consent in Mexico is complex. Typically, Mexican states have a "primary" age of consent (which may be as low as 12 or the onset of puberty), and sexual conduct with persons below that age is always illegal. Sexual relations which occur between adults and teenagers under 18 are legally ambiguous: laws against corruption of minors as well as estupro (statutory rape) laws can be applied to such acts, at the discretion of the prosecution. These laws are situational and are subject to interpretation. The federal age of consent in Mexico is 15.

The ages of consent in the countries of Central America range from 13 to 18.

In four territories (Anguilla, the Cayman Islands, Montserrat and the Turks and Caicos Islands), as well as in the sovereign nation of the Bahamas, there is a higher age of consent for same-sex sexual relations than opposite-sex ones.

The list of jurisdictions in North America is per the list of sovereign states and dependent territories in North America.

== Overview ==
The age of consent is the age at or above which a person is considered to have the legal capacity to consent to sexual activity. Both partners must be of legal age to give consent, although exceptions to the age of consent law exist in some jurisdictions when the minor and their partner are within a certain number of years in age or when a minor is married to his/her partner. Persons below the age of consent may not, by law, give consent, and sexual relations involving such persons may be punished by criminal sanctions similar to those for rape or sexual assault. Non-violent sexual contact with persons under the age of consent may be punished with varying degrees of severity, ranging from a misdemeanor with a simple fine, to a felony with a punishment equivalent to rape.

Different ages may apply if one partner is in a position of power or authority over the other, such as a teacher, manager, coach, parent or stepparent. For example, in Indiana the age of consent is 16 but it is illegal for a person over 18 to have sex with anyone under 18 if they work at their school, are their parent or a stepparent, or are a person recruiting them to join the military.

Historically, the age of consent applied to male-female relationships; same-sex relationships were often illegal regardless of the ages of participants. Modern laws vary, and there may be multiple ages that apply in any jurisdiction. For instance, different ages may apply if the relationship is between partners of the same sex, or if the sexual contact is not strictly vaginal intercourse.

== Antigua and Barbuda ==
In Antigua and Barbuda, the age of consent is 16. The Sexual Offences Act of 1995 raised the age of consent from 14 to 16 years of age.

- Sexual Intercourse with female between fourteen and sixteen

6. (1) Where a male person has sexual intercourse with a female person who is not his wife with her consent and who has attained the age of fourteen years but has not yet attained the age of sixteen years, he is guilty of an offence, and is liable on conviction to imprisonment for ten years.

(2) A male person is not guilty of an offence under subsection (1) –

(a) if he honestly believed that the female person was sixteen years of age or more; or

(b) if the male person is not more than three years older than the female person and the court is of the opinion that the evidence discloses that as between the male person and the female person, the male person is not wholly or substantially to blame.

- Sexual intercourse with male under sixteen

7. (1) Where a female adult has sexual intercourse with a male person who is not her husband and who is under the age of sixteen years, she is guilty of an offence, whether or not the male person consented to the intercourse, and is liable on conviction to imprisonment for seven years.

A female adult is not guilty of an offence under subsection (1) –

(a) if she honestly believed that the male person was sixteen years of age or more; or

(b) if the female adult is not more than three years older than the male person and the court is of the opinion that evidence discloses that as between the female adult and the male person, the female adult is not wholly or substantially to blame.

== Anguilla (United Kingdom) ==
The age of consent in Anguilla is 16. It is determined in Part 14 of the Criminal Code – SEXUAL OFFENCES -Sexual Offences Against Minors – by Article 143. "Sexual intercourse with person between 14 and 16 years of age".

== Aruba ==
The age of consent in Aruba is 15, as specified in Article 251 of the Criminal Code of Aruba (which Aruba adapted after its secession from the Netherlands Antilles) which reads:

Article 251: "A person who, out of wedlock, with a person who has reached the age of twelve but has not reached fifteen, performs indecent acts comprising or including sexual penetration of the body is liable to a term of imprisonment of not more than eight years or a fine of at most 100 000 florin".

== Bahamas ==
In the Bahamas, the age of consent for opposite-sex activity is 16 and the age of consent for same-sex activity is 18. Homosexuality was legalized in 1991, but "public homosexuality" is an offense that carries a 20-year jail term without parole.

11. (1) Any person who has unlawful sexual intercourse with any person being of or above fourteen years of age and under sixteen years of age, whether with or without the consent of the person with whom he had unlawful sexual intercourse, is guilty of an offence and liable to imprisonment for life subject to, on a first conviction for the offence, a term of imprisonment of seven years and, in the case of a second or subsequent conviction for the offence, a term of imprisonment of fourteen years.

== Barbados ==
In Barbados the age of consent is 16.

Section 5, part I "Sexual intercourse with person between 14 and 16" of the Sexual Offences Act 1992

(1) Where a person has sexual intercourse with another with the other's consent and that other person has attained the age of 14 but has not yet attained the age of 16 that person is guilty of an offence and is liable on conviction on indictment to imprisonment for a term of 10 years.

== Belize ==
In Belize, the age of consent is 16, regardless of sexual orientation or gender.

The legislation reads:

Criminal Code [CAP. 101]

- Section 47.1

"Every person who, with or without consent, has sexual intercourse with a person who is under the age of fourteen years commits the offence of unlawful sexual intercourse and is liable on conviction on indictment to imprisonment for a term that is not less than twelve years but may extend to imprisonment for life."

- Section 47.2

"Every person who has unlawful sexual intercourse with a person who is above the age of fourteen years but under the age of sixteen years, commits an offence and is liable on conviction on indictment to imprisonment for a term that is not less than five years but no more than ten years."

== Bermuda and British Virgin Islands (United Kingdom) ==
Age of sexual consent is 16, regardless of sexual orientation and/or gender.

== Canada ==
The Tackling Violent Crime Act took effect on 1 May 2008, raising the age of consent from 14 to 16.

There are two close-in-age exemptions, depending on the age of the younger partner. A youth of twelve or thirteen can consent to sexual activity with an individual less than two years older than them. A fourteen- or fifteen-year-old can consent to sexual activity with a partner who is less than five years older than them.

Criminal law (including the definition of the age of consent) is in the exclusive jurisdiction of the federal government, so the age of consent is uniform throughout Canada. Section 151 of the Criminal Code of Canada makes it a crime to touch, for a sexual purpose, any person under the age of 16 years. Section 153 then goes on to prohibit the sexual touching of a person under 18 by a person in three circumstances: if he or she is in a "position of trust or authority" towards the youth, if the youth is in a "relationship of dependency" with him or her, or if the relationship is "exploitative". The term "position of trust or authority" is not defined in the Code but the courts have ruled that parents, teachers, and medical professionals hold a position of trust or authority towards youth they care for or teach. Section 153 (1.2) of the Code provides that a judge can infer whether or not a relationship is "exploitative" by considering its nature and circumstances including how old the youth is, the difference in ages between the partners, how the relationship evolved, and the degree of control or influence that the older partner has over the youth.

The "position of trust under 18" anti-exploitation rules were expanded in 2005 by Bill C-2 where a judge may choose to term a situation to be sexual exploitation based on the nature and circumstances of the relationship including the age of the younger party, age difference, evolution of the relationship (how it developed, e.g. quickly and secretly over the Internet), the control or influence over the young person (degree of control or influence the other person had over the young person). This passed before the 2008 amendments, and they were not repealed so they are still in effect and can apply towards adults in these situations with young persons over the age of consent and under 18 (16–17).

Where an accused is charged with an offence under s. 151 (Sexual Interference), s. 152 (Invitation to sexual touching), s. 153(1) (Sexual exploitation), s. 160(3) (Bestiality in presence of or by child), or s. 173(2) (Indecent acts), or is charged with an offence under s. 271 (Sexual assault), s. 272 (Sexual assault with a weapon, threats to a third party, or causing bodily harm), or s. 273 (Aggravated sexual assault) in respect of a complainant under the age of sixteen years, it is not a defense that the complainant consented to the activity that forms the subject-matter of the charge.

=== History of the Canadian age of consent ===
During the 19th century, the age of consent for heterosexual vaginal sex was 12; in 1890, the Parliament raised the age of consent to 14. The punishment for anyone who had sexual intercourse with someone younger than 14 was life imprisonment and whipping, while the punishment for anyone who attempted to seduce an underage girl was two years' imprisonment and whipping. Canada also had laws against "seducing" minor girls who were over the age of consent. In 1886, a law was enacted that made the "seduction" of a girl over 12 and under 16 "of previously chaste character" a criminal offence; the "seduction" of a female under 18 "under promise of marriage" was also made illegal in 1886, and amended in 1887 to apply to females under 21. After the raising of the age of consent to 14, the laws against "seducing" minor girls were amended to apply to those older than 14, and various laws of this kind have remained in force through the 20th century. The age of consent was raised from 14 to 16 in the spring of 2008, when the Tackling Violent Crime Act became effective. The new measures still allow for close-in-age exceptions between 12 and 16: if there is no more than a two-year gap for those 12 and 13, or a five-year gap for those 14 and 15.

In 1969, the Criminal Code was amended to provide exemptions to the criminalization of consensual anal intercourse, including exemptions for husbands and wives and all persons over the age of 21. In 1988, Section 159 was enacted, reducing the applicable age from 21 to 18. In June 2019, Bill C-75 repealed Section 159, making anal intercourse subject to the same age of consent requirements as other sexual acts.

Female homosexuality was never illegal in the former British colonies; oral sex was legalized in 1969 with the same age of consent as vaginal sex.

== Cayman Islands (United Kingdom) ==
The age of consent in Cayman Islands is 16.

Defilement of girls under sixteen years of age, etc.

134. (1) Whoever unlawfully and carnally –

(a) knows any girl under the age of twelve years is guilty of an offence and liable to imprisonment for twenty years; or

(b) knows any girl between the ages of twelve and sixteen years is guilty of an offence and liable to imprisonment for twelve years.

Indecent assaults on females

132. (1) It is an offence for a person to make an indecent assault on a woman.

(2) A girl under the age of sixteen cannot in law give any consent which would prevent an act being an assault for the purposes of this section.

== Caribbean Netherlands ==
The age of consent in the Caribbean Netherlands (Bonaire, Saba and Sint Eustatius) is 16, as specified by the Criminal Code BES, Articles 251, which reads:

Art 251: "A person who, out of wedlock, with a person who has reached the age of twelve but has not reached sixteen, performs indecent acts comprising or including sexual penetration of the body is liable to a term of imprisonment of not more than sixteen years". Before prosecution, the public attorney will, if possible, allow the minor to indicate if prosecution is deemed desirable.

== Clipperton Island (France) ==
Clipperton Island is an uninhabited nine-square-kilometre (approx. 3.5-square-mile) coral atoll in the eastern Pacific Ocean, a state private property under the direct authority of the French government, administered by the Minister of Overseas France. The laws of France where applicable apply. See Ages of consent in Europe#France.

== Costa Rica ==
In Costa Rica, the age of consent is 18, with an exemption allowing for a 7-year age difference for 15-, 16-, and 17-year-olds; and for 5-year age difference for 13- and 14-year olds.

Costa Rican law 9406 makes it illegal for a person 18 years of age or older to have sexual relations with another person less than 15 years old if the older party is five or more years older than the minor. If the younger sexual partner is between 15 and 17 years old, the maximum age difference permitted is seven years.

For 13- and 14-year-olds, an age difference of only five years is permitted.

However, sexual relations with persons aged 13 to 17 constitute the offense of "relations with a minor" (Article 159), carrying base penalties ranging from two to six years in prison—depending on the age difference—and up to 10 years if a position of authority is involved.

Any sexual contact with a minor under the age of 13 is classified as rape, with prison sentences of ten to fifteen years. (Article 156).

== Cuba ==
The age of consent in Cuba is 12. The Código Penal de Cuba of 2022 provides that laws of estupro apply to minors over 12 (but under 16) only when deception or abuse of authority is involved. Charges are filed by their guardian, and such charges may be dropped before or during the trial.

== Curaçao (Netherlands) ==
The age of consent in Curaçao is 15, as specified by the Criminal Code of the Netherlands Antilles (which Curaçao didn't change after the dissolution of the Netherlands Antilles), Articles 251, which reads:

Art 251: "A person who, out of wedlock, with a person who has reached the age of twelve but has not reached fifteen, performs indecent acts comprising or including sexual penetration of the body is liable to a term of imprisonment of not more than sixteen years".

For children 12–14 prosecution only takes place upon a "complaint" by the minor, his parents, teacher, or the guardianship board.

== Dominica ==
In Dominica the age of consent is 16.

"Defilement of girls between fourteen (14) and sixteen (16) years of age", Article 4 of the Sexual Offences Act

" (1) Subject to subsections (2) and (3), any person who – a) unlawfully and carnally knows, or attempts to have unlawful carnal knowledge of any girl of or above the age of fourteen (14) years and under the age of sixteen (16) years (...) – is liable to imprisonment for seven years.

== Dominican Republic ==
The age of consent in the Dominican Republic is 18.

== El Salvador ==
In El Salvador, the age of consent appears to be 15, although the laws are not clear cut in regard to sexual acts with persons aged between 15 and 18.

== Greenland (Denmark) ==
The laws of Denmark, where applicable, apply. See Ages of consent in Europe#Denmark.

== Grenada ==
The age of consent in Grenada is 16. Penalties are 30 years' imprisonment if the victim is less than 14, and 15 years' imprisonment if the victim is 14 or 15 years of age.

== Guatemala ==
In Guatemala, as of 2020, the age of consent is 14, regardless of sexual orientation and/or gender. The Law against Sexual Violence, Exploitation, and Trafficking in Persons was passed in February 2009, and provides sentences ranging from 13 to 24 years in prison, depending on the young persons age, for sex with a minor.

== Haiti ==
The age of consent in Haiti is 18.

== Honduras ==
In Honduras, the age of consent is considered to be 14.

Article 142. The stupor of a person older than fourteen (14) and under eighteen (18) years taking advantage of trust, hierarchy or authority, is punishable by six (6) to eight (8) years of imprisonment. When rape is committed by deception is punishable by five (5) to seven (7) years of imprisonment.

Article 143. The sexual intercourse with parents or children, brothers, or relationship between adopter and adopted, with stepparent, when the victim is over eighteen (18) years constitutes the crime of incest, will be punished with four (4) to six (6) years of imprisonment and shall proceed under complaint by the injured party or his legal representative. When the victim is older than fourteen (14) and under eighteen (18) years, the penalty shall be increased in a medium (1/2).

Article 144. Whoever for sexual character and by force, intimidation or deceit abducts or retains a person shall be punished by imprisonment of four (4) to six (6) years. When the victim of this crime is a person under eighteen (18) years of age, it is punishable with the penalty prescribed in the preceding paragraph increased by half (1/2).

== Jamaica ==
In Jamaica the age of consent is 16.

"Above twelve (12) and under sixteen (16)", Article 50, Offences Against the Person

" Whosoever shall unlawfully and carnally know and abuse any girl being above the age of twelve (12) years and under the age of sixteen (16) years shall be guilty of a misdemeanour, and being convicted thereof, shall be liable to imprisonment for a term not exceeding seven years;

== Mexico ==
Age of consent in Mexico by state. 12 14 15 18 Stripes: Puebla and Oaxaca presume estupro under 15. Jalisco allows 15 if seduction disproven.

Each Mexican state sets a minimum age of consent of between 12 and 15. The federal government sets an age of 18, and there are statutory rape (estupro) laws that prohibit deception and often seduction in order to have sex with a minor over the minimum age of consent. For example, Puebla sets the minimum age at 12, but presumes that any sex between an adult and a minor under 15 is statutory rape, so effectively 12 is a hard minimum and 15 a soft minimum; sex with a minor over 15 is also potentially prosecutable, though usually only at the request of the minor or their legal guardians.

== Montserrat (United Kingdom) ==
The age of consent in Montserrat is 16.

Unlawful sexual intercourse with girl under age of sixteen

121.(1) Subject to the provisions of the section, a man who has unlawful sexual intercourse with a girl above the age of thirteen and under the age of sixteen shall be guilty of an offence and liable to imprisonment for two years.

(2) It is immaterial in the case of a charge for an offence under this section that the intercourse was had with the consent of the girl concerned.

Indecent assault on a woman

122.(1) Subject to the provisions of this section, any man who makes an indecent assault on a woman shall be guilty of an offence and liable— (...)

(2) A girl under the age of sixteen years cannot in law give consent which would prevent an act being an assault for the purposes of this section.

== Nicaragua ==
In Nicaragua, the age of consent is 18, although, in regard to young people 16–17, the law (Article 175) is not clear cut.

Article 170. Statutory rape

Anyone who is married or in a stable de facto union or who is of age and who, without violence or intimidation, has or allows carnal access with a person aged between 14 and 16 shall be sentenced to imprisonment for a period of two to four years.

Article 175. Sexual exploitation, pornography and paid sexual acts with adolescents

Anyone who induces, provides, promotes or uses persons aged under 16 or a disabled person for sexual or erotic purposes, forcing them to witness or participate in an act or show in public or in private, even if the victim consents to witness or participate in such an act, shall be sentenced to imprisonment for a period of five to seven years, or four to six years if the victim is aged between 16 and 18.

(...)

Article 168. Rape of children under the age of 14

Anyone who has or allows carnal access with a person aged under 14 or who, for sexual purposes, inserts or forces the victim to insert a finger, object or instrument, by way of the vagina, anus or mouth, with or without consent, shall be sentenced to imprisonment for a period of 12 to 15 years.

Article 172. Sexual abuse

Anyone who engages in lewd acts with or improper touching of another person, without their consent, (...)

In no circumstances shall the victim be considered to have given consent if the victim is under the age of 14 or has a mental disability or illness.

== Panama ==
In Panama, the age of consent is in general 18, although sexual conduct with children aged 14 to 18 is not always illegal.

Artículo 176. Quien, valiéndose de una condición de ventaja, logre acceso sexual con persona mayor de catorce años y menor de dieciocho, aunque medie consentimiento, será sancionado con prisión de dos a cuatro años

Translation: Article 176. Whoever, using a condition of advantage, achieves sexual intercourse with a person over fourteen and under eighteen, even with consent, shall be punished with imprisonment from two to four years

This does not apply if the age difference is less than 5-years and the partners are in a stable couple relationship.

No se aplicarán las sanciones señaladas en este artículo cuando entre la víctima y el agente exista una relación de pareja permanente debidamente comprobada y siempre que la diferencia de edad no supere los cinco años.

Translation: The sanctions provided in this article do not apply if there is a couple relationship duly established between the victim and the agent, and the age difference does not exceed five years.

== Puerto Rico (United States) ==
The age of consent in Puerto Rico is 16. There is a 4-year close-in-age exception subject to a minimum age of 14.

Article 130.- Sexual Assault.- Any person who performs sexual penetration, whether an orogenital act or vaginal or anal sex penetration, whether genital, digital, or instrumental ... shall be punished ... when the victim has not attained the age of sixteen (16) years, except when the victim is over fourteen (14) years old and the age difference between the victim and the accused is four (4) years or less.

Article 133.- Lewd Acts.- Any person who, without the intention to consummate the crime of sexual assault described in Article 130, subjects another person to an act that tends to awaken, excite or satisfy the sexual passion or desire of the accused ... shall be punished ... when the victim has not attained the age of sixteen (16) years at the time of the act.

== Saint Kitts and Nevis ==
The age of consent in Saint Kitts and Nevis is 16.

== Saint Lucia ==
The age of consent in Saint Lucia is 16.

== Saint Vincent and the Grenadines ==
The age of consent in Saint Vincent and the Grenadines is 15. The penalty for statutory rape of a girl over 13 but under 15 is five years' imprisonment; under 13 it is life imprisonment.

== Sint Maarten (Netherlands) ==
The age of consent in Sint Maarten is 15, as specified by the Criminal Code of the Netherlands Antilles (which Sint Maarten did not change after the dissolution of the Netherlands Antilles), Articles 251, which reads:

Art 251: 1. "A person who, out of wedlock, with a person who has reached the age of twelve but has not reached fifteen, performs indecent acts comprising or including sexual penetration of the body is liable to a term of imprisonment of not more than sixteen years".

Prosecution for the violation of the above article only takes place upon a "complaint" by the minor, his parents, teacher, or the guardianship board (Art 251, 2. 3. 4.)

== Trinidad and Tobago ==
The age of consent in Trinidad and Tobago is 18, as per the Children Act, 2012. It was raised from 16 to 18 in 2015.

The Children Act, 2012 defines a "child" as "a person under the age of eighteen years".

18. Subject to section 20, a person who sexually penetrates a child commits an offence and is liable on conviction on indictment, to imprisonment for life.

19. (1) Subject to section 20, where a person touches a child and– (a) the touching is sexual; and (b) the child is under sixteen years of age, the person commits an offence.

(2) A person who commits an offence under subsection (1) is liable– (a) on summary conviction, to a fine of fifty thousand dollars and to imprisonment for ten years; or (b) on conviction on indictment, to imprisonment for twenty years. (3) Where a person commits an offence under subsection (1), and the touching involves the placing of any body part or of an object onto the penis or bodily orifice of a child, that person is liable on conviction on indictment to imprisonment for life.

Three close-in-age exemptions exist, as per section 20:

20. (1) A person sixteen years of age or over but under twenty-one years of age is not liable under section 18 if– (a) he is less than three years older than the child against whom he is purported to have perpetrated the offence; (b) he is not in a familial relationship with the child nor in a position of trust in relation to the child; (c) he is not of the same sex as the child; and (d) the circumstances do not reveal any element of exploitation, coercion, threat, deception, grooming or manipulation in the relationship.

(2) A person fourteen years of age or over but under sixteen years of age is not liable under section 18 or 19 if– (a) he is less than two years older than the child against whom he is purported to have perpetrated the offence; (b) he is not in a familial relationship with the child nor in a position of trust in relation to the child; (c) he is not of the same sex as the child; and (d) the circumstances do not reveal any element of exploitation, coercion, threat, deception, grooming or manipulation in the relationship.

(3) A person twelve years of age or over but under fourteen years of age is not liable under section 18 or 19 if– (a) he is less than two years older than the child against whom he is purported to have perpetrated the offence; (b) he is not in a familial relationship with the child nor in a position of trust in relation to the child; (c) he is not of the same sex as the child; and (d) the circumstances do not reveal any element of exploitation, coercion, threat, deception, grooming or manipulation in the relationship.

== Turks and Caicos ==
The age of consent in Turks and Caicos is 16.

== United States ==
Minimum age of consent in the United States by state: Minimum age is 16 Minimum age is 17 Minimum age is 18

In the United States, the age of consent laws are made at the state, territorial, and federal district levels. There exist several federal statutes related to protecting minors from sexual predators, but none of them imposes an age limit on sexual acts. On 26 June 2003, both heterosexual and homosexual sodomy became legal in all U.S. states, territories, and the District of Columbia under the U.S. Supreme Court decision Lawrence v. Texas (between non-commercial, consenting adults in a private bedroom). In State v. Limon (2005), the Kansas Supreme Court used Lawrence as a precedent to overturn the state's "Romeo and Juliet" law, which proscribed lesser penalties for heterosexuals than homosexuals convicted of similar age of consent related offenses.

== Virgin Islands (United States) ==
The age of consent is 18. There is however a close-in-age exemption that allows minors 16 and 17 years old to consent with someone no more than five years older than themselves and minors 13 to 15 years old to consent with one another, but not with anyone 16 or over.

Article § 1700. Aggravated rape in the first degree bans sexual intercourse or sodomy with a child under 13. Sexual acts with minors are aggravated by the use of force, intimidation, or the perpetrator's position of authority, and by the fact that the minor, being under 16 and not the perpetrator's spouse, is residing in the same household as the perpetrator.(see Article § 1700, Article § 1702, Article § 1708).

Other relevant articles of the criminal code are:

- § 1702. Rape in the second degree

(a) Any person over 18 years of age who perpetrates under circumstances not amounting to rape in the first degree, an act of sexual intercourse or sodomy with a person not the perpetrator's spouse who is at least 16 years but less than 18 years of age, and the perpetrator is 5 years or older than the victim, is guilty of rape in the second degree and shall be imprisoned not more than 10 years.

- § 1703. Rape in the third degree

Any person under 18 years of age but over 16 years of age who perpetrates an act of sexual intercourse or sodomy with a person not the perpetrator's spouse who is under 16 years of age but over 13 years of age, under circumstances not amounting to rape in the first degree, is guilty of rape in the third degree and shall be subject to the jurisdiction of the Family Division of the Superior Court

"Sexual contact", that is, non-penetrative sex, defined as "the intentional touching of a person's intimate parts, whether directly or through clothing, to arouse or to gratify the sexual desires of any person" is not permitted with children under 16, but a close-in-age exemption allows those aged at least 13 to engage in such acts with partners under 18.

- § 1708. Unlawful sexual contact in the first degree

A person who engages in sexual contact with a person not the perpetrator's spouse— (..)(2) when the other person is under thirteen years of age;

- § 1709. Unlawful sexual contact in the second degree

A person over eighteen years of age who engages in sexual contact with a person not the perpetrator's spouse who is over thirteen but under sixteen years of age is guilty of unlawful sexual contact in the second degree and shall be imprisoned not more than 1 year. Paraphrasing Virgin Islands Code: V.I.C. § 1700–1709 Virgin Islands Code and appeals records Francis vs. VI NOTE: "mistake of fact as to the victim's age is not a defense".

== See also ==
- Age of consent by country
- Ages of consent in Africa
- Ages of consent in Asia
- Ages of consent in Europe
- Ages of consent in Oceania
- Ages of consent in South America
