= Age of consent in Asia =

Legal ages for sexual activity in Asia

The legal age of consent for sexual activity varies by jurisdiction across Asia. The specific activity engaged in or the gender of participants can also be relevant factors. Below is a discussion of the various laws dealing with this subject. The highlighted age refers to an age at or above which an individual can engage in unfettered sexual relations with another who is also at or above that age. Other variables, such as homosexual relations or close in age exceptions, may exist, and are noted when relevant.

The unrestricted age of consent is the legal age from which one is deemed able to consent to having sex with anyone else at or above the age of consent, or the marriageable age if they must be married.

== Summary ==
All jurisdictions in Asia per List of sovereign states and dependent territories in Asia:

=== Definitions ===
- Restricted by age difference: younger partner is deemed able to consent to having sex with an older one as long as their age difference does not exceed a specified amount. This column shows the younger partner's age of consent under these rules, not the age difference.
- Restricted by authority: younger partner is deemed able to consent to having sex with any older partner, so long as said older partner is not in a legally recognised position of trust or authority, which the latter is abusing over the former.
- Unrestricted: age from which one is deemed able to consent to having sex with anyone else at or above the age of consent or the marriageable age if they must be married.

=== Table ===
Ages of consent by country, sex, sex difference, age difference, and authority between partners.
Countries and states	Must be married	By age				By authority				Unrestricted				Ref.
Countries and states	Must be married	Hetero		Homo		Hetero		Homo		Hetero		Homo		Ref.
Countries and states	Must be married	M	F	M	F	M	F	M	F	M	F	M	F	Ref.
Afghanistan	Yes	—				—				Puberty		—		
Armenia	No	—				—				16				
Azerbaijan	No	—				—				16				
Bahrain	No	18 (if married)	16 (if married)	—		—				21				
Bangladesh	No	—				—				16		—		
Bhutan	No	—				—				18				
Brunei	Yes	—				—				16		—		
Cambodia	No	—				—				15				
China	No	—				—				14				
Gaza Strip	Yes	—				—				18		—		
Georgia	No	—				—				16				
Hong Kong	No	—				16				21				
India	No	—				—				18				
Indonesia	No	—				—				18				
Iran	Yes	—				—				15	13	—		
Iraq	No	—				—				15		—		
Israel	No	14				—				16				
Japan	No	13				16				18				
Jordan	No	—				—				18				
Kazakhstan	No	—				—				16				
Kuwait	Yes	—				—				17	15	—		
Kyrgyzstan	No	—				—				16				
Laos	No	—				—				15				
Lebanon	No	—				—				18				
Macau	No	—				14				18				
Malaysia	Yes (for Muslims) No (for Non-Muslims)	—				16		—		18		—		
Maldives	Yes	—				16		—		18		—		
Mongolia	No	—				—				16				
Myanmar	No	—				15 (if married)		—		16		—		
Nepal	No	—				—				18				
North Korea	No	—				—				15				
Oman	Yes	—				—				18		—		
Pakistan	Yes	—				—				18	16 (18 in Sindh and the Punjab)	—		
Philippines	No	13				16				18				
Qatar	Yes	—				—				18	16	—		
Saudi Arabia	Yes	—				—				18		—		
Singapore	No	—				16				18				
South Korea	No	—				—				16				
Sri Lanka	No	—				—				16		—		
Syria	No	—				—				15		—		
Taiwan	No	—				—				16				
Tajikistan	No	—				—				16				
Thailand	No	—				15				18				
Timor-Leste	No	—				14				16				
Turkey	No	—				—				18				
Turkmenistan	No	—				—				16		—		
United Arab Emirates	Yes	—				—				18		—		
Uzbekistan	No	—				—				16		—		
Vietnam	No	—				—				16				
West Bank	No	—				—				16				
Yemen	Yes	—				—				15		—		

== Afghanistan ==
Sexual activity outside marriage is illegal in Afghanistan. According to the Ministry for the Propagation of Virtue and the Prevention of Vice, marriage is allowed at puberty.

== Armenia ==
The age of consent in Armenia is 16.

"Article 141. Sexual acts with a person under 16.

Sexual intercourse or other sexual acts with a person obviously under 16, by a person who reached 18 years of age, in the absence of elements of crime envisaged in Articles 138, 139 or 140 of this Code, is punished with correctional labor for the term of up to 2 years, or with imprisonment for the term of up to 2 years."

== Azerbaijan ==
The age of consent in Azerbaijan is 16.

"Article 152

Sexual intercourse with the person below the age of 16 years, as well as the same offences linked with satisfaction of sexual passion in perverted forms shall be punished by imprisonment up to 3 years."

== Bahrain ==
Consensual sex outside of marriage is legally permissible for those aged 21 and above, regardless of gender and/or sexual orientation. If a married individual has sex with somebody they are not married to, the person they are married to is given the liberty, by the criminal procedure code, to file for an 'adultery' charge if they wanted to. They are also given the liberty to drop off the charge after filing it if they wanted to. However, the mentioned options would not be available after three months are passed from when the person learned about the adultery. The marriage of course should be recognized by the government for the mentioned options to be provided.

The marriageable age is 16 years for females, and 18 for males. Before this age, marriage requires authorization from the Shariah Court of the State of Bahrain. The minimum age to marry without permission from the girl's father or legal guardian is 18 years.

Rape is punished by imprisonment. Since 1986, the penalty is either life imprisonment or possibly the death penalty for victims under 16. Non-consent is assumed for unmarried women under 14. According to article 349 of the updated penal code, the death penalty for the rapist is eligible only if the rape causes death for the sexually assaulted female.

The law presumes non-consent of male victims less than 14 too. There is a prison sentence (maximum 10 years) for male victims under 16 (article 346) while article 347 gives an unspecified prison sentence with consenting male victims under 21.

== Bangladesh ==
According to section 9 (1) of the Women and Child Abuse Prevention Act, 2003, it is defined as rape to have sexual intercourse with a woman with or without her consent, when she is under 14 years of age. Article 375 specifies that “A man is said to commit "rape" who except in the case hereinafter excepted, has sexual intercourse with a woman With or without her consent, when she is under fourteen years of age. (Exception) Sexual intercourse by a man with his wife, the wife not being under thirteen years of age, is not rape.

== Bhutan ==
The age of consent in Bhutan is 18 regardless of gender or sexual orientation, according to Article 183 of the Penal Code of Bhutan.

== Brunei ==
Any kind of sexual activity outside of a heterosexual marriage is illegal in Brunei. The minimum age for marriage is 16.

Article 2 of this Act determines the offence as follows: Any person who has or attempts to have carnal knowledge (sexual intercourse) of a girl under the age of sixteen (16) years except by way of marriage, shall be guilty of an offense: Penalty, imprisonment for a term which shall not be less than 2 years and not more than 7 years and to whipping not exceeding 24 strokes of the rattan in the case of an adult or 12 strokes of the rattan in the case of a youthful offender.

== Cambodia ==
The age of consent in Cambodia is 15 regardless of gender or sexual orientation. The age of consent in this country is determined by Article 8, of Chapter 4 (Debauchery) of the Law on Suppression of the Kidnapping, Trafficking, and Exploitation of Human Beings, which has been specifically enacted to prohibit sex with children under 15. The law prohibits "debauchery" with a child under 15, and this term (the original Cambodian word is anacha has been interpreted by courts to forbid any form of sexual conduct (both consensual and non-consensual; both 'ordinary' sex and paid sex) with a child under 15. This is the main legal tool used to prosecute foreigners engaging in child sex tourism in Cambodia.

Article 8 of the 'Law on Suppression of the Kidnapping, Trafficking, and Exploitation of Human Beings' states, "Any person who commits acts of debauchery involving a minor below 15 years old, even if there is consent from the concerned minor, or even if the person has bought such minor from someone else or from a pimp, shall be punished by ten (10) to twenty (20) years in prison. In case of repeat offenses, the maximum punishment term shall be applied."

== Mainland China ==
In Mainland China, the age of consent for sexual activity is 14 years, regardless of gender or sexual orientation. Chinese law defines statutory rape as having sex with a girl who is less than fourteen years of age. A five-year prison sentence and fine may result if the girl under 14 years of age was acting as a prostitute. In August 2015, the law concerning underage prostitutes was repealed. The Statutory rape law now applies to underage prostitution as well. Persons with Special Duties towards minor females who have attained the full age of 14 shall be held accountable for rape if they compel the victim engaging in sexual relations with them by taking advantage of their dominant positions or the helpless situations of the victim.

In 2020, there was a proposal to raise the age of consent in the wake of a scandal in the city of Yantai.

In 2021, there was a proposal to criminalize teachers having intercourse with students in primary and junior high levels.

As of 2026, neither proposal has been enacted.

== East Timor ==
The age of consent in East Timor is 14 regardless of gender or sexual orientation, per Article 177. However, sex acts with an adolescent aged above 14 but under 16 years of age are illegal if an adult practices them with the adolescent by "taking advantage of the inexperience" of that adolescent. (Article 178).

Article 177. Sexual abuse of a minor:

1. Any person who practices vaginal, anal or oral coitus with a minor aged less than 14 years is punishable with 5 to 20 years' imprisonment.
2. Any person who practices any act of sexual relief with a minor aged less than 14 years is punishable with 5 to 15 years' imprisonment.

Article 178. Sexual acts with an adolescent:

1. Any person who, being an adult and apart from situations provided in this section, practices any relevant sexual act with a minor aged between 14 and 16 years, taking advantage of the inexperience of the same, is punishable with up to 5 years' imprisonment.

== Georgia ==
The age of consent in Georgia is 16 as per Article 140 and 141 of the Georgian Penal Code.

== Hong Kong ==
In Hong Kong the age of consent for sexual activity is 16 regardless of gender or sexual orientation. However, the age of consent for a female receiving anal sex is 21.

Under s.124 of the Crimes Ordinance (Cap.200), a man who has unlawful sexual intercourse with a girl under the age of 16 shall be liable to imprisonment for 5 years. Under s.123 of the Crimes Ordinance, a man who has unlawful sexual intercourse with a girl under the age of 13 shall be liable to imprisonment for life.

Under s.122 of the Crimes Ordinance, a person under the age of 16 cannot in law give any consent which would prevent an act being an assault for the purposes of indecent assault. Hence, a woman who has sexual activity with a boy or a girl under 16 will be prosecuted under this section.

Under s.127 of the Crimes Ordinance, a person who takes an unmarried girl under the age of 18 out of the possession of her parent or guardian against the will of the parent or guardian with the intention that she shall have unlawful sexual intercourse with men or with a particular man shall be guilty of an offence and shall be liable on conviction on indictment to imprisonment for 7 years."

The previous position regarding homosexual couples is contained in s.118C which provides that a man who commits or suffers to commit buggery with a man under the age of 21 is liable on conviction on indictment to imprisonment for life. However, this section was struck down as unconstitutional in Leung TC William Roy v Secretary for Justice. Hence, the age of consent between two males have been effectively equalized with that between a male and a female, which is 16.

Prior to 2012 there was a presumption that a male minor under 14 could not consent to sexual intercourse under any circumstances. The law was changed after a 13-year-old boy attacked a 5-year-old girl at a Chai Wan hospital ward; the prosecution was unable to convict him of rape, instead only able to do so for indecent assault. In 2015 an 11-year-old boy and a 13-year-old boy were arrested after they were found having sex with an 11-year-old girl. Under the new laws they have the possibility of having the maximum sentence of life in prison.

== India ==
India's age of consent for sex is set at 18 years under the Criminal Law (Amendment) Act, 2013, regardless of gender.

In 1892, the marital rape and subsequent death of a 10-year-old girl, Phulmoni Dasi, caused the age of consent to be raised from 10 to 12. In 1949, it was raised to 16 after agitation from women's groups about the adverse effect of early pregnancy. On 3 April 2014 the Criminal Law (Amendment) Act, 2013 came into effect, which raised the legal permissible age for sexual consent from 16 to 18. Although the Criminal Law (Amendment) Act, 2013 initially sought to lower the age to 16, it was set at 18 due to political pressure from conservative parties. Section 375 reads: A man is said to commit "rape" if he ... Sixthly – With or without her consent, when she is under eighteen years of age.

=== Legal action on marital rape ===
Protection of Children from Sexual Offences Act, 2012 disallows any such sexual relationships and puts such crimes within marriages as an aggravated offense. A Public Interest Litigation filled by Independent Thought, an organization working on child rights law, was heard in the Supreme Court of India for declaring the exception allowing marital rape within prohibited child marriages as unconstitutional: Independent Thought vs. Union of India [W.P(civil) 382 of 2013]. In the judgment, delivered on 11 October, the Supreme Court bench consisting of Justices Madan B. Lokur and Deepak Gupta read down Exception 2 to Section 375 of the Indian Penal Code (IPC) to hold that sexual intercourse by a man with his own wife if she is below 15 years of age would amount to rape. According to Section 375 Exception, Sexual Intercourse by a man with his own wife, the wife not being under 15 years of age, is not rape.

The Section 377 of the Indian Penal Code bans "carnal intercourse against the order of nature". It was used to prosecute people for having anal or oral sex, although prosecutions were rare. The law was constitutionally challenged and subsequently read down by the Delhi High Court in 2009 for violating the human rights of sexual minorities. In 2013, the Supreme Court overturned the Delhi High Court's judgment, recriminalizing homosexuality. However, in 2018, the Supreme Court, on hearing a fresh batch of petitions, declared some parts of the law unconstitutional on the issue, setting the age of consent for consensual homosexual sex at 18, same age for consensual heterosexual sex.

== Indonesia ==
According to Article 415 of Penal Code Act 2023, the age of consent in Indonesia is 18 years old, regardless of gender. Individuals younger than 18 years old in Indonesia were illegal to consent of sexual activity, and such activity may result in prosecution for statutory rape of the enforcement penal law.

Under Article 415, an individual can be sentenced to up to nine years in prison imprisonment for engaging in sexual activity with a child. Meanwhile, under Article 416 paragraph (1) provides a higher penalty of up to twelve years' imprisonment if the act causes serious injury, while paragraph (2) provides for a sentence of up to fifteen years' imprisonment if it results in death.

This interpretation is based on Article 415 section (b), which criminalizes committing an obscene act with a person known or reasonably suspected to be a child. The definition of a child is provided in Article 150, which states that a child is any person under 18 years of age.

Additionally, under Articles 411 and 412, premarital sex and extramarital sex between adults are illegal sexual activities, but enforcement requires a complaint from a member of the nuclear family for punishment to be applied. An exception applies in Aceh, where such sexual activity is regulated under regional Sharia law and may be prosecuted without a complaint.

== Iran ==
Sex outside of marriage is illegal in Iran. The minimum age of marriage in Iran is 15 for boys and 13 for girls. Ways around these regulations include temporary marriages (Nikah mut'ah). With the permission of a court, girls may marry at a younger age. In 2010, as many as 42,000 children aged between 10 and 14 were married, and 716 girls younger than 10 had wed. Under the Civil Code 2007, marriage “before the age of majority” is prohibited. However the age of majority is 9 lunar years (8 years and 9 months) for girls.

== Iraq ==
The age of consent in Iraq is set at 15, regardless of gender and/or sexual orientation. "Any person who sexually assaults a boy or girl under the age of 15 without the use of force, menaces or deception is punishable by detention..."

"Any person who has sexual intercourse with a female relative to the third generation under the age of 15 with her consent and the offence leads to her death, to pregnancy or loss of virginity [is punishable by jail]."

Attempts were made by conservative parties in the Iraqi parliament to legalize child marriage in 2024. However, a revised bill was passed in January 2025 which reinstated the clauses of the previous amendment following protests in Iraq along with backlash from both international and local civil society groups. This prevented the formal recognition of child marriage in Iraqi law, ultimately keeping the age of consent at 15. The January 2025 revised bill also explicitly prohibits lowering the age of consent.

== Israel ==
According to the Israeli Penal Code of 1977 the age of consent in Israel is 16 regardless of gender or sexual orientation, for any form of sexual relations involving penetration. A special case arises when a person aged 14 or 15 had sexual relations with an older partner; in this case the older partner would be exempt of criminal liability if three conditions are met: the age difference between the partners was less than three years, the younger partner gave consent and the act was done out of "regular friendly relations" and without the abuse of power.

== Japan ==
The age of consent in Japan is 16 years old, according to Articles 176 and 177 of the Penal Code (as amended in 2023).

In the original 1907 Penal Code, the age of consent was 13 years old, which by 2023 was among the world's lowest. Article 176 ("Forcible Indecency") established a penalty of 6 months to 10 years of imprisonment for "indecent acts" with males and females under 13 years old, and Article 177 ("Rape") established a minimum sentence of 3 years for sexual intercourse with females under 13. In 2017, Article 177 was amended to specify vaginal, anal, and oral intercourse, to apply to all persons instead of females, and to increase the minimum sentence to 5 years. In 2023, the two articles were amended to raise the age of consent from 13 to 16 years old. An exception was included for sexual acts involving persons aged 13 to 15, by which the older partner is only subject to penalty if five or more years older. The amendments were part of a larger reform of Japan's sex crime legislation.

On the other hand, even before the revision of the Penal Code, several laws made it illegal to engage in sexual acts with minors under the age of 18. For example, the Child Welfare Law (ja) of 1947 prohibits the act of "causing a person under the age of 18 to engage in indecent acts (淫行, inkō)," with a maximum penalty of 10 years in prison. Under this law, a person who influences and encourages a minor to engage in indecent acts is punishable, even if the minor does so voluntarily. An array of local ordinances adopted in all 47 Japanese prefectures, known as Seishōnen Hogo Ikusei Jōrei (青少年保護育成条例; "Bylaws for Protecting and Nurturing Adolescents") forbid sexual acts judged "indecent" (淫行, inkō) between adolescents (defined as persons under 18) and adults; 12 prefectures adopted such a bylaw in the 1950s, 19 in the 1960s, 13 in the 1970s, 2 in the 1980s, and the last (Nagano Prefecture) in 2016. A 1985 decision of the Supreme Court of Japan held that the ordinances were not to be broadly interpreted as forbidding all sexual acts with adolescents, but only those "conducted by unfair means that take advantage of the juvenile's mental or physical immaturity, such as by enticing, threatening, deceiving, or confusing, as well as [acts] where the juvenile is treated merely as an object to satisfy one's own sexual desires." The Supreme Court also ruled that sexual acts within "socially accepted norms", such as within marriage, engagement, or a "similar sincere relationship", were not "indecent". As of 2004, about 1,000 offenses by adults are punished annually under these bylaws; a typical penalty is a ¥300,000 fine and a suspended sentence.

== Jordan ==
The age of consent in Jordan is set at 18 years old, regardless of gender and/or sexual orientation, according to the country's penal code.

== Kazakhstan ==
The age of consent in Kazakhstan is 16, according to article 122 of the Crime Criminal Code.

Article 122. Sexual Intercourse and Other Actions of a Sexual Character with a Person Under Sixteen Years of Age Sexual intercourse, sodomy, or lesbianism or other acts of sexual nature, with a person who did not reach sixteen years of age, the guilty party being aware of that fact, shall be punished by restriction of freedom for a period up to three years, or by detention under arrest for a period up to six months, or deprivation of freedom for a period up to five years.

== Kuwait ==
Sexual activity outside marriage is illegal in Kuwait. The marriageable age is 17 for boys, and 15 for girls.

== Kyrgyzstan ==
The age of consent in Kyrgyzstan is 16, regardless of gender or sexual orientation. This is established by Article 132 of the penal code, and only applies to offenders over age 18.

Article 133 forbids "lecherous actions" against persons below 14 committed without violence. Anyone aged 16 (the general age of criminal responsibility) or above can be punished under this section.

== Laos ==
The age of consent in Laos is 15 regardless of gender or sexual orientation. Article 129 of the Laos Penal Code provides for a penalty of 1–5 years' imprisonment and a fine of 2–5 million kip.

== Lebanon ==
The age of consent for sex in Lebanon is 18 for both males and females in regardless of gender or sexual orientation.

Article 505 of the Penal Code states, "Whoever commits a sexual act with a minor of less than fifteen (15) years, shall be punished with hard labor of up to fifteen (15) years. This penalty shall be for a minimum of five (5) years, if the victim has not attained the age of twelve (12) years. And whoever commits a sexual act with a minor aged more than fifteen (15) to years but less than eighteen (18) years, shall be punished by imprisonment for a period varying between 2 months and 2 years."

According to Lebanese Marital Law, individuals aged between 15 (14 in the case of females with judicial consent) and 18, may marry in exceptional cases (when factoring in areas of the law, such as and including both parental and judicial consent), and in the cases of females – marriage is allowed outright, as an unrestricted right, from the age of 17. However it is unclear, as to what extent sex within the confines of marriage impacts on the general age of consent.

== Macau ==
The general age of consent in Macau is 14, regardless of gender or sexual orientation, provided that the older participant did not abuse the inexperience of a person aged 14 or 15.

Otherwise the general age of consent is 16 years of age (except in specific cases where an individual aged 16 to 18 years of age is entrusted to an adult for education or assistance purposes whom have abused such position – as specified under article 167/1(b) of the Macau Criminal Code).

Sex with minors younger than 14 years old is more severely punished (1 to 8 years' imprisonment) compared to minors aged 14 or 15 (up to 4 years' imprisonment if the perpetrator abused the minor's inexperience). Anal sex, irrespective of the gender or orientation of the participants (male-male, female-female, male-female), has an aggravated punishment (3 to 10 years of prison if practiced with a minor under the age of 14 and up to 4 years if practiced with an older minor).

== Malaysia ==
The de facto age of consent for heterosexual sex in Malaysia is 16 for both sexes, as homosexual activity in Malaysia is illegal. However, premarital sexual activity, regardless of heterosexual or homosexual, is illegal for all Muslims in Malaysia.

Under the Malaysian Penal Code (Act 574), Section 375, the specified age is 16;

Rape. A man is said to commit "rape" who, except in the case hereinafter excepted, has sexual intercourse with a woman under circumstances falling under any of the following descriptions: (...) Sixthly – With or without her consent, when she is under sixteen years of age.

However, Article 17 of the Sexual Offences Against Children Act 2017 makes any sexual touching of a child (defined as under 18 years) punishable by up to 20 years imprisonment.

== Maldives ==
Sexual activity outside marriage is illegal in Maldives.

The legal age of marriage is 18 for both males and females (16 with parental consent).

== Mongolia ==
The age of consent in Mongolia is 16, regardless of gender or sexual orientation.

== Myanmar ==
The age of consent in Myanmar is 16. It was raised from 14 with the amendment of the Myanmar Penal Code section 375, paragraph 5 in 2016.

If married, the legal age is now 15.

== Nepal ==
The age of consent in Nepal is 18 regardless of gender or sexual orientation.

== North Korea ==
The age of consent in North Korea is 15.

A person who has sexual intercourse with a minor under the age of fifteen shall be punished by reform through labour for less than one year. In cases where the person has intercourse multiple times, the person shall be punished by reform through labour for less than five years.
15살에 이르지 못한 미성인과 성교한자는 1년이하의 로동단련형에 처한다. 여러번 성교한 경우에는 5년이하의 로동교화형에 처한다.

— Article 281, Criminal Law, 2016

== Oman ==
Sexual activity outside marriage is illegal in Oman.

== Pakistan ==
Sexual activity outside marriage is illegal in Pakistan.

The minimum legal age of marriage is 18 for males and females. There is no separate consent age law, so the marriage age is taken as the consent age.

== Palestine ==
=== Gaza Strip ===
In the Gaza Strip, any kind of sexual activity outside marriage and homosexual activity is illegal.

=== West Bank ===
The age of sexual consent is the same as in Jordan. Consensual sex is legal at the age of 16 years regardless of gender.

== Philippines ==
The minimum age for consensual sex is set at 16 years, regardless of gender and/or sexual orientation. There is a close in age exemption for adolescents aged 13–15 if their partner is less than three years older.

Until 2022, the age of consent was 12. Sexual intercourse with a person under the age of 12 was defined as rape, under Chapter 3, Article 266 of the Anti-Rape Law of 1997.

Relevant sections of the revised legislation - as amended in 2022 - now read that -

Rape is committed:

'When the offended party is under (16) years of age or is demented, even though none of the circumstances mentioned above be present: Provided, That there shall be no criminal liability on the part of a person having carnal knowledge of another person sixteen (16) years of age when the age difference between the parties is not more than (3) years, and the sexual act in question is proven to be consensual, non-abusive, and non-exploitative: Provided, further, That if the victim is under (13) years of age, this exception shall not apply.

As used in this Act, non-abusive shall mean the absence of undue influence, intimidation, fraudulent machinations, coercion, threat, physical, sexual, psychological, or mental injury or maltreatment, either with intention or through neglect, during the conduct of sexual activities with the child victim. On the other hand, non-exploitative shall mean there is no actual or attempted act or acts of unfairly taking advantage of the child's position of vulnerability, differential power, or trust during the conduct of sexual activities.'

Further legislation comments:

'Those who commit the act of sexual intercourse or lascivious conduct with a child exploited in prostitution or subjected to other sexual abuse: Provided, That when the victim is under sixteen (16) years of age, the perpetrators shall be prosecuted under Article 335, paragraph 2, for rape and Article 336 of Act No. 3815, as amended, otherwise known as "The Revised Penal Code", for rape, or lascivious conduct, as the case may be: Provided, That the penalty for lascivious conduct when the victim is under sixteen (16) years of age shall be reclusion temporal in its medium period; and

"SEC. 7. Child Trafficking. - Any person who shall engage in trading and dealing with children including, but not limited to, the act of buying and selling of a child for money, or for any consideration, or barter, shall suffer the penalty of reclusion temporal to reclusion perpetua. The penalty shall be imposed in its maximum period when the victim is under sixteen (16) years of age.'

'Any person who shall keep or have in his company a minor sixteen (16) years of age or under or who is ten (10) years or more his junior in any public or private place, hotel, motel, beer joint, discotheque, cabaret, pension house, sauna or massage parlor, beach, and/or other tourist or similar places shall suffer the penalty of prision mayor in its maximum period and a fine of not less that Fifty thousand pesos (P50,000.00): Provided, That this provision shall not apply to any person who is related within fourth degree of consanguinity or affinity or any blood recognized by law, local custom and tradition or acts in the performance of a social, moral or legal duty.'

There is also an abuse of trust clause regarding those who hold a position of authority, which reads: 'The seduction of a minor, sixteen and over but under eighteen years of age, committed by any person in public authority, priest, home-servant, domestic, guardian, teacher, or any person who, in any capacity, shall be entrusted with the education or custody of the minor seduced, shall be punished by prision correccional in its minimum and medium periods'.

History

Prior to 2022, several proposals had been made to increase the age of sexual consent from 12 to 16. In 2020, the Philippine House of Representatives Committees on Revision of Laws and Welfare of Children passed a proposal to raise it to 16. In September 2021, the Philippine Senate unanimously voted in favor of the age of consent bill, and President Rodrigo Duterte signed the Senate proposal into law in March 2022.

== Qatar ==
Any kind of sexual activity outside the confines of marriage is illegal in Qatar.

According to the Family Act, the minimum age of marriage is 18 for boys and 16 for girls. A court may allow a marriage below the minimum ages – as specified, but it requires the consent of the legal guardian of, as well as the consent of the two persons under the specified ages to be married.

== Saudi Arabia ==
Any kind of sexual activity outside marriage is illegal in Saudi Arabia. In 2019, Saudi Arabia officially banned all marriages under the age of 18 for both men and women. The Saudi Shura Council had outlawed marriages under the age of 15, and required court approval for those under 18. In accordance with the Child Protection Law, the law has a provision that states "Before the conclusion of the marriage contract, it is necessary to ensure that a person marrying under the age of 18 will not be harmed, whether male or female."

== Singapore ==
The general age of consent in Singapore is set at 16, regardless of gender and/or sexual orientation. However, where there is a relationship of trust, authority or dependency, the age of consent is 18. The relationship must not be exploitative of the younger person.

In addition, Sections 375, 376, 376A, 376AA, 376EA, 376EC, 376EE, 377BL and 377D criminalize sexual activity with individuals below the age of 18 if the relationship is deemed exploitative of the younger person. Section 377CA stipulates that the court can determine if such a relationship is exploitative depending on the "circumstances of each case" – including age gap between the accused and the youth, the nature of the relationship, and the degree of control or influence exercised by the accused person over the minor. It also stipulates that – unless the accused is married to the younger partner – such relationships will be deemed exploitative until proven otherwise, if:

(a) the accused person is the parent, step-parent, guardian or foster parent of the minor;
(b) the accused person is the de facto partner of the parent, guardian or foster parent of the minor;
(c) the accused person is a member of the teaching or management staff of the school or educational institution at which the minor is a student;
(d) the accused person has an established personal relationship with the minor in connection with the provision of religious, sporting, musical or other instruction to the minor;
(e) the accused person is a custodial officer of an institution in which the minor is detained;
(f) the accused person is a registered medical practitioner, a registered traditional Chinese medicine practitioner or a psychologist and the minor is a patient of the accused person;
(g) the accused person is an advocate and solicitor or a counsellor and the minor is a client of the accused person.

In addition, Section 376B criminalizes commercial sexual activity with youth under 18 – regardless of whether it occurs within or outside Singapore. Section 376D also further criminalizes attempting to travel outside Singapore for the purposes of committing such actions outside Singapore.

Homosexuality between females was decriminalized in 2007, and on November 29, 2022, Parliament of Singapore repealed section 377A of the Penal Code and decriminalized homosexuality between males.

== South Korea ==
The age of consent in South Korea is 16 for both males and females regardless of gender or sexual orientation.

In South Korea, sexual activity with a person under the age of 16 (in international age, not "Korean age") is considered statutory rape, unless the other party is under 19. Sex with a child under 13 is considered statutory rape under all circumstances. Prior to 2020 the age of consent in South Korea was 13.

== Sri Lanka ==
The age of consent in Sri Lanka is 16 regardless of gender or sexual orientation. However, girls belonging to Sri Lanka's Moor and Malay minorities representing approximately 10% of the national population are allowed to marry after 12 years of age and below the age of 12 with the approval of the religious leader, Moulavi and either father, brother, uncle, grandfather.

...

(e) with or without her consent when she is under sixteen years of age, unless the woman is his wife who is over twelve years of age and is not judicially separated from the man.

365B. (1) Grave sexual abuse is committed any person who, for sexual gratification, does any act, by the use of his genitals or any other part of the human body or any Instrument on any orifice or part of the body of any other person, being an act which does not amount to rape under section 363, in circumstances falling under any of the following descriptions, that is to say:

(a) without the consent of the other person;

(aa) with or without the consent of the other person when the other person is under sixteen years of age;

...

== Syria ==
The age of consent in Syria is 15, per Article 491.

Article 491:

1. Every person who has sexual intercourse with a minor under 15 years of age shall be liable to a term of nine years' imprisonment at hard labour.

2. The said term shall be not less than 15 years if the child is under 12 years of age.

== Taiwan ==
The age of consent in Taiwan is 16 regardless of gender. The sentence is reduced or exempted if the offender is under 18. Also, if the offender is under 18, it's an offense indictable only upon a complaint. The penalties for having consented sexual intercourse with minors are separated into 2 age ranges, with those under 14 subject to 3 to 10 years, and those between 14 and 16 subject to a maximum of 7 years. Note that since such cases with "offenders" under 18 are indictable only upon complaint, practically if both parties are under 16, parents most likely would not press charges in fear of the fact that if one side sues, the other side may sue as well resulting in both minors being sentenced.

== Tajikistan ==
The age of consent in Tajikistan is 16, as specified in article 141 of the Criminal Code. The penalty is specified as deprivation of freedom for 2 to 5 years.

Article 141. Sexual Intercourse And Other Actions of Sexual Character With an Individual Under 16 Years of Age

"(1) Sexual intercourse, homosexuality or lesbianism committed by an individual at the age of 18 years with an individual under 16 years of age when there are no elements of the crime stipulated by Article 138 and Article 139 of the present Code, is punishable by deprivation of freedom for a period of 2 to 5 years."

Articles 138 and 139 provide harsher penalties for Rape and Forcible sex against minors, including the possible death penalty for rape of a girl under 14.

== Thailand ==
The age of consent in Thailand is 15 regardless of gender or sexual orientation, as specified by article 279 of the Thai Criminal Code. The current legislation applies to all regardless of gender or sexual orientation. A close-in-age exemption allows sexual acts from age 14 if the older party is no more than 21.

However, parts of the Prevention and Suppression of Prostitution Act, which disallow any sexual contact with prostitutes under the age of 18, are widely interpreted by some local authorities to cover sexual acts classed as "obscenity for personal gratification". The Penal Code Amendment Act of 1997 (Section 283 bis) implies this to be within the context of sexual trafficking. A high-profile example of this application of the law was a statutory rape charge filed against the lead singer of the Thai band Big Ass for allegedly having had sex with a (then) 16-year-old girl. The charge was filed by the girl after the singer refused to take responsibility for her baby. The singer has since been cleared of being the baby's father due to the results of a paternity test and he received 2 years suspended sentence.

== Turkey ==
The age of consent in Turkey is 18.

According to Article 104 of the Turkish Penal Code (Türk Ceza Kanunu), sexual intercourse with minors aged 15, 16 and 17 can only be prosecuted upon a complaint. These complaints require the intention of the youth over the age of 15 and not the parents. However, if the offender is a person who is forbidden to marry the child by law or is a person who is obliged to take care of the child due to adoption or foster care, then the prosecution doesn't require a complaint and the punishment is aggravated.

Article 103 regulates any kind of sexual activity with minors under 15 (or minors under 18 who lack the ability to understand the legal meanings and consequences of such actions) as child sexual abuse.

=== History ===
The Ottoman Empire, a predecessor state to the Republic of Turkey, decriminalized sodomy in 1858. The age of consent in Turkey was set at 15 for both heterosexual and homosexual sex in the 1926 penal code, but this was raised to 18 in 1953. The new penal code of 2004 also set the age of consent for both heterosexual and homosexual sex at 18, with some differences, such as the act of having sexual intercourse with a minor over 15 being punishable upon a complaint.

== Turkmenistan ==
The age of consent in Turkmenistan is 16.

== United Arab Emirates ==
Sexual activity outside marriage is illegal in the United Arab Emirates. The general legal age of marriage is 18 for both sexes (although mature minors are allowed to marry with judicial permission).

In 2020, United Arab Emirates decriminalized sex outside of marriage. Consensual sex will be punished by the law if the victim, male or female, is under 18 years of age, or if the victim is deprived of their will due to their young age, insanity or mentally challenged or if the culprit is a first degree relative of the victim or responsible for their upbringing or usual care or has an authority of the minor victim.

A person convicted of committing sexual intercourse with a minor or mentally challenged person by force would be punished by the death penalty.

== Uzbekistan ==
The age of consent in Uzbekistan is 16 for heterosexual sex as well as for homosexual activities not amounting to anal sex, which is illegal regardless of age and punishable with imprisonment for up to three years (called Besoqolbozlik).

Sexual relations with a person under sixteen (16) years of age, Clause 128 of the Criminal Code: (1) A sexual relation or satisfaction of sex requirements in the unnatural form with a person who was obviously less than sixteen (16) years old, shall be punished by corrective labour measures for up to two (2) years or by the arrest up to six (6) months, or with imprisonment for up to one (1) year.

== Vietnam ==
The 2015 Penal Code indicates that the age of consent in Vietnam is 16 regardless of gender or sexual orientation.

Article 145 criminalizes sexual activity with those aged 13–15 in situations not amounting to rape (article 142 – requires threat or violence) or sexual abuse (article 144 – employing "trickery" to make a 13-15-year-old who is the offender's care-dependent or a person in extreme need "reluctantly engage in sexual intercourse or other sexual activities").

Article 145. Engaging in sexual intercourse or other sexual activities with a person aged from 13 to under 16

1. Any person aged 18 or over who engages in sexual intercourse or other sexual activities with a person aged from 13 to under 16 in cases other than those specified in Article 142 and Article 144 hereof shall face a penalty of 01 – 05 years' imprisonment. 2. This offence committed in any of the following cases shall carry a penalty of 03 – 10 years' imprisonment: a) The offence has been committed more than once; b) The offence is committed against 02 or more people; c) The offence is of an incestuous nature; d) The offence results in the victim's pregnancy; dd) The offence results in 31% – 60% physical disability of the victim; e) The offence is committed against a person for whom the offender is responsible for providing care, education, or medical treatment. 3. This offence committed in any of the following cases shall carry a penalty of 07 – 15 years' imprisonment: a) The offence results in ≥ 61% physical disability of the victim; b) The offender commits the offence in the knowledge of his HIV infection.

4. The offender might be forbidden from practicing his/her profession or doing certain jobs for 01 – 05 years.

Article 146. Molestation of a person under 16

1. Any person who molests a person under 16 for purposes other than sexual intercourse or other sexual activities shall face a penalty of 06 – 36 months' imprisonment. 2. This offence committed in any of the following cases shall carry a penalty of 03 – 07 years' imprisonment: a) Organized crime; b) The offence has been committed more than once; c) The offence is committed against 02 or more people; d) The offence is committed against a person for whom the offender is responsible for providing care, education, or medical treatment; dd) The victim suffers from 11% – 45% mental and behavioral disability because of the offence; e) Dangerous recidivism. 3. This offence committed in any of the following cases shall carry a penalty of 07 – 12 years' imprisonment: a) The victim suffers from 46% mental and behavioral disability or above because of the offence; b) The offence results in the suicide of the victim.

4. The offender might be forbidden from practicing his/her profession or doing certain jobs for 01 – 05 years.

Article 147. Employment of a person under 16 for pornographic purposes

1. Any person aged 18 or over who persuades, entices, forces a person under 16 to participate in a pornographic performance or watch a pornographic performance in any shape or form shall face a penalty of 06 – 36 months' imprisonment. 2. This offence committed in any of the following cases shall carry a penalty of 03 – 07 years' imprisonment: a) Organized crime; b) The offence has been committed more than once; c) The offence is committed against 02 or more people; d) The offence is committed against a person for whom the offender is responsible for providing care, education, or medical treatment; dd) The offence is committed for commercial purposes; e) The victim suffers from 11% – 45% mental and behavioral disability because of the offence; g) Dangerous recidivism. 3. This offence committed in any of the following cases shall carry a penalty of 07 – 12 years' imprisonment: a) The victim suffers from 46% mental and behavioral disability or above because of the offence; b) The offence results in the suicide of the victim.

4. The offender might be forbidden from practicing his/her profession or doing certain jobs for 01 – 05 years.

== Yemen ==
Any kind of sexual activity outside marriage is illegal in Yemen. Until recently, Yemeni law set the age of marriage at 15. However, that law has been eradicated. Now, "Yemeni law allows a girl of any age to wed, but it forbids sex with them until the indefinite time they are suitable for sexual intercourse.'" In 1999, the minimum marriage age of fifteen for women, rarely enforced, was abolished; the onset of puberty, interpreted by ulama to be at the age of nine, was set as a requirement for consummation of marriage.

In April 2008, the case of Nujood Ali, a 10-year-old girl who successfully obtained a divorce, sparked headlines around the world, and prompted calls to raise the legal age for marriage to 18. Later in 2008, the Supreme Council for Motherhood and Childhood proposed to define the minimum age for marriage at 18 years. The law was passed in April 2009, but dropped the following day following maneuvers by opposing parliamentarians. Negotiations to pass the legislation continue.

== See also ==
- Age-of-consent reform
- Age of consent
- Age of consent by country
- Ages of consent in Africa
- Ages of consent in Europe
- Ages of consent in North America
- Ages of consent in Oceania
- Ages of consent in South America
- Comprehensive sex education
- LGBT rights in Asia
- Sex education
