= Age of consent in South America =

Age of consent for heterosexual sex in South America 13 14 15 16

The age of consent for sexual activity refers to an age at or above which an individual can engage in unfettered sexual relations with another who is of the same age or older. This age varies by jurisdiction across South America, codified in laws which may also stipulate the specific activities that are permitted or the gender of participants for different ages. Other variables may exist, such as close-in-age exemptions.

In South America, the only country where male same-sex sexual conduct is illegal is Guyana. The only countries with a higher age of consent for same-sex sexual relations than opposite-sex ones are Paraguay and Suriname.

Scope: all jurisdictions per list of sovereign states and dependent territories in South America, with discussion of applicable laws.

== Introduction ==
In South America, countries have varying levels of restriction of sexual activities with minors. The age above which there are no restrictions confers full sexual autonomy with respect to the law. The minimum age of consent is the age at which someone can legally give consent, which may include certain restrictions. Sexual acts with someone under the minimum age are legally classified as sexual abuse.

== Summary ==
=== Definitions ===
- Restricted by age difference: younger partner is deemed able to consent to having sex with an older one as long as their age difference does not exceed a specified amount. This column shows the younger partner's age of consent under these rules, not the age difference.
- Restricted by authority: younger partner is deemed able to consent to having sex with any older partner, so long as said older partner is not in a legally recognised position of trust or authority, which the latter is abusing over the former.
- Unrestricted: age from which one is deemed able to consent to having sex with anyone else at or above the age of consent or the marriageable age if they must be married.

== Argentina ==
In Argentina, the age at which there are no restrictions for sexual activities is 18, and differing levels of protection are instituted for individuals under 13, 16 and 18, with the minimum age of consent being 13.

Sexual acts with individuals aged between 13 and 18 are addressed by several laws, but none of these laws create a blank prohibition against such relations, but make them open to prosecution under certain circumstances (such as if the relationship is considered exploitative or if the minor was "corrupted").

Restrictions apply for sex with people between the ages of 13 and 16 (Argentine Penal Code, Article 120). Charges can be brought only after a complaint by the minor, their parent or guardian – (Argentine Penal Code Article 72) (however, the State prosecutes when the minor has no parent or legal guardian, or when the offender is one of them).

=== Article 120 combined with Article 119 ===
The restrictions mentioned above (for ages between 13 and 16) apply whenever someone over 18, taking advantage of the sexual immaturity of the minor or of his/her superiority (preeminencia) with respect to the minor, practices one of the following acts:

- creates an abusive situation of sexual submission severely "outrageous" to the minor, either continuously or for its circumstances (Article 120 combined with Article 119, 2nd paragraph);
- or when any type of sex (acceso carnal) is obtained by the means of violence, threat, abusive coercion, or harassment in a relationship of dependence, authority or power, or by taking advantage of the fact that the minor, for any reason, couldn't freely give consent –

(Arg. Penal Code, Article 120 combined with Article 119, 1st and 3rd paragraphs).

There is also a further Argentine law, 'Corruption of minors', which can bring charges to those manipulating minors below the age of 18 into having sexual relations – (Argentine Penal Code Article 125 – in Spanish).

=== Article 125 ===
Article 125 reads:

El que promoviere o facilitare la corrupción de menores de dieciocho años, aunque mediare el consentimiento de la víctima será reprimido con reclusión o prisión de tres a diez años.

Approximate translation: Anyone who promotes or facilitates the corruption of persons under eighteen, even with the consent of the victim shall be punished with seclusion or imprisonment of three to ten years.

Penalties are aggravated in three situations:

- (a) if the minor is under 13;
- (b) when sex is obtained by the means of deceit, violence, threat, abuse of authority or by any other means of intimidation or coercion, as well as when the offender is a parent or legal guardian, brother/sister, spouse, or someone who is a constant companion or who is responsible for educating or guarding the minor; or
- (c) when the offender takes advantage of being a previous companion to the minor, in order to violate any of the restrictions aforementioned for ages between 13 and 16 (Argentine Penal Code – Article 119, 4th paragraph, section “f” – in Spanish).

== Bolivia ==
The age of consent in Bolivia is set at 14, as per Art. 308 Bis, Violación de Niño, Niña o Adolecente (Rape of Boys, Girls and Adolescents), which punishes rape (Spanish: violación) of children under 14, "even without the use of force or intimidation and when consent is alleged" (así no haya uso de la fuerza o intimidación y se alegue consentimiento). There is a close-in-age exemption of three years for adolescents of ages 12 and older.

There is also the crime of estupro, which is carnal access using seduction or deceit, with adolescents aged 14–18 (Art. 09).

"Corruption of minors" (Article 318) brings charges to those that "through libidinous acts or by any other means, corrupts or contributes to corrupt" minors below the age of 18, with penalty of loss of liberty of 1–5 years.

The Bolivian Family Code (Art. 44 and 53) allows marriage if the male is 16 years or older and if the female is 14 years or older with parental approval, with judicial discretion in the case of a dispute.

== Brazil ==
In Brazil, the age of consent is 14, regardless of gender or sexual orientation. Although not legally formalized, there is judicial precedent allowing a close-in-age exception for those aged 12–13 to engage in sexual activity with partners who are as much as 5 years older. The age at which there are no restrictions for sexual activities is 14.

Sex with minors below the age of 14 (for all those older than 18), is equivalent to statutory rape and is legally defined by Art. 217-A of the Brazilian Penal Code as the "rape of a vulnerable person" (Portuguese: Estupro de vulnerável), with a penalty of 8–15 years imprisonment.

The prostitution of minors (all ages under 18) is punished by law and is prosecuted by the state as a crime against family care, Art. 244–247, as well as Art. 218-B, 227, 230, 231 and 231-A. The law makes no distinctions between sexual orientation cases.

Only individuals aged 18 or older can be criminally charged, since this is the Brazilian age of criminal responsibility codified in Art. 228 of the Constitution of Brazil.

=== History ===
The Brazilian Imperial Code, in Art. 219, added by Notice 512 of 1862, established the age of 17 for legal presumption of violence in sexual relations. Later, the Republican Penal Code of 1890, in Art. 272, lowered this age to 16.

The Penal Code of 1940 further lowered the presumption of violence in sexual acts (equivalent of statutory rape) to 14 (Art. 224-A), but consensual sex with adolescents aged 14–17 could still be prosecuted under "corruption of minors" (Art. 218) or "seduction of minors" (Art. 217) while, in both cases, only parents could file charges to form a lawsuit (Art. 225).

Sex with young adolescents aged 12–13, although under the age of statutory rape, were then also prosecutable only by parents (Art. 225), while sex with those younger than 12 was prosecuted by the state based on the legal definition of a child in the Code of Minors.

As an exception, the state could prosecute the offender when the minor was at any age below 18 but only when the family of the minor was so poor that they couldn't afford a lawsuit, or when the offender was the father, mother, stepfather, stepmother or legal guardian of the minor (Penal Code, Art. 225, I & II).

In March 2005, the crime of seduction of minors (Art. 217) was abolished by the Brazilian Congress. It had been applicable only when the victim was a virgin female aged 14–18.

In August 2009, the crime of corruption of minors (Art. 218) referring to consensual acts with adolescents aged 14–17 without parental consent, was abolished by Law 12.015/2009. The crime was replaced with a new one under the same name but now applicable to sexual acts with minors below 14 and prosecutable by the state (Art. 225).

The crime of sexual harassment (Art. 216-A) practiced in situations of hierarchical superiority or ascendency in a job, position or occupation is now punishable with a higher penalty if the victim is less than 18 years of age.

== Chile ==
In Chile, the minimum age of consent is 14, while the age at which there are no restrictions for sexual activities is 18. Limitations exist for those aged 14–17 (Chilean Penal Code, Art. 362). Homosexual activity was illegal with anyone under 18 years of age (Art. 365) until 2022. The age of consent for homosexual activity is now set at 14, just like heterosexual sex.

Having sex with a person under 14 years of age is considered statutory rape (Art. 362) and is punishable by "imprisonment of any degree" (Spanish: presidio mayor en cualquiera de sus grados).

Sexual contact with those aged 14–17 is limited under estupro legislation (Art. 363), which defines such contact as illegal under certain conditions in which the offender is taking advantage:

- When one takes advantage of a mental anomaly or perturbation of the child, even if transitory.
- When one takes advantage of dependency or subordinate relationship of the child, like in cases when the aggressor is in charge of the custody, education, or caretaking of the child, or when there exists a labor relationship with the child.
- When one takes advantage of severely neglected children.
- When the victim is deceived by abusing their sexual inexperience or ignorance.

The sexual acts regulated by Art. 361–363 and 365 are defined as "carnal access" (acceso carnal), which means either oral, anal, or vaginal intercourse. Other articles within the penal code regulate other sexual interactions. Art. 365 bis. regulates the "introduction of objects" either in the anus, vagina, or mouth. Art. 366 bis, defines "sexual act" as any relevant act with sexual significance accomplished by physical contact with the victim, or affecting the victim's genitals, anus, or mouth, even when no physical contact occurred.

Art. 369 states that charges relating to these offenses (Art. 361–365) can be brought only after a complaint by the minor or the minor's parent, guardian, or legal representative. Nevertheless, if the offended party cannot freely file the complaint and lacks a legal representative, parent, or guardian, or if the legal representative, parent, or guardian is involved in the crime, the Public Ministry may proceed on its own.

=== History ===
In 1810, the age of consent for opposite-sex activity was 12. In 1999, the age of consent was set at 14 for both girls and boys in relation to heterosexual sex. Homosexual acts were decriminalized in 1999, with an age of consent of 18. In 2011, the Constitutional Court of Chile confirmed that the age of consent is 14 for heterosexual relations (for both girls and boys) and lesbian relations (woman–girl), but 18 for male homosexual relations. In August 2018, the Constitutional Court again rejected that Article 365 of the Criminal Code was unconstitutional, in a 5-5 vote, validating for the second time in its history that the age of consent for gay men is 18, while for heterosexuals and lesbians is 14 years old.

On August 2, 2022, the Senate approved a bill repealing Article 365 that, if enacted, would establish a universal age of consent set at 14, regardless of gender or sexual orientation. The Chamber of Deputies passed the bill on August 17, 2022. The law was published in the Diario Oficial de la República de Chile on August 24, 2022, and entered into force from the date of its publication.

== Colombia ==
The Criminal Code of Colombia (Act 599 of 2000), as modified by Art. 4 of law 1236 of 2008, sets the age of consent at 14, regardless of gender or sexual orientation.

Sexual intercourse with a person under 14 years of age is punishable by imprisonment of 12–20 years (Art. Researched by Jerry Dusky and Mario 208). Engaging in sexual acts other than intercourse, or inducing the engagement of sexual practices, with a person under 14 is punishable by imprisonment of 9–13 years (Art. 209).

Corruption of minors does not exist in the current Penal Code.

=== History ===
Statutory rape (estupro) law existed in the Criminal Code of 1980 (Art. 301–302 of Decree 100 of 1980) and has since been repealed by Act 599 of 2000.

== Ecuador ==
Under the new Criminal Code, which came into force in 2014, the minimum age of consent in Ecuador is 14, regardless of gender or sexual orientation. Sex with a child under 14 is considered rape (Art. 171).

Sexual acts between adults and teens aged 14–17 can be prosecuted under the statutory rape law (Spanish: Estupro, Art. 167) under certain circumstances, such as when an adult uses deceit to gain consent. When consent is obtained through exploitative means, the offender can be prosecuted under the Childhood and Adolescence Code of 2003. Art. 68 of this code broadened the definition of sexual abuse of minors to include any physical contact or suggestion of sexual nature obtained through seduction, blackmail, harassment, deceit, threat, or similar means.

Art. 173 of the criminal code relates to internet grooming, and criminalizes anyone who, through electronic means, proposes to arrange an encounter with a person under 18 years of age for sexual or erotic purposes.

== Falkland Islands (United Kingdom) ==
The age of sexual consent in the Falkland Islands is 16, regardless of sexual orientation or gender, since 2006.

== South Georgia and the South Sandwich Islands (UK) ==
The age of sexual consent is 16, regardless of sexual orientation or gender, since 2006.

== Guyana ==
The age of consent in Guyana is 16. This was raised from 13 on 31 October 2005, by a unanimous resolution of the Guyanese parliament.

Anal sex is punishable with life imprisonment, while male homosexual "indecency" and all attempted anal sex carry a 10-year sentence. Female homosexual activity is not mentioned in the 1860 buggery laws.

== Paraguay ==
The general age of consent in Paraguay is 14 for heterosexual relations and 17 for homosexual relations.

Sexual acts with a child under 14 are punished with up to 3 years imprisonment or a fine. The same penalties apply to performing sexual acts in the presence of a child or enticing a child to practice sexual acts with a third person. In the case of sexual penetration (Spanish: coito), the punishment is 3–12 years imprisonment (Paraguayan Penal Code, Art. 135). If the victim is under 10, sentences may carry up to 15 extra years.

Homosexual acts with minors aged 14–17 are punishable by a fine or up to 2 years in prison (Art. 138).

There is also the crime of estupro, defined as "extramarital sex", practiced by a married person with female adolescents aged 14–16. It is punished with a fine (Art. 137).

When the offender is under 18, accusations may be lifted for heterosexual acts (Art. 135, clause 6) and estrupro (Art. 137, clause 2), but there is no such provision for homosexual acts.

== Peru ==
The age of consent in Peru has changed several times during recent years, and has been subject to political debates. As of December 2012, it was fixed at 14, regardless of gender or sexual orientation, in accordance with a decision of the Constitutional Court of Peru. Art. 173 and 176-A of the Criminal Code prohibit sexual conduct with children under 14. Consensual sexual acts with youth aged 14–17 are not illegal, although there is a prohibition against using deceit to gain sexual access to a minor under 18 (Art. 175).

== Uruguay ==
The age at which there are no restrictions for sexual activity in Uruguay is 18, regardless of gender or sexual orientation, and differing levels of protection are instituted for children under 12, 15 and 18, with the general age of consent being 15. The age of consent is 13 if the difference in age in not more than 8 years. (Penal Code, Art. 272, 267, 274).

For sexual relations with children aged 12–15, violence is legally presumed until otherwise proven (Art. 272–1). In such cases, the accused has the onus probandi (burden of proof) to demonstrate that consent was given. Below the age of 12, proof of consent is not a defense.

Uruguay also has a corruption of minors law, which can bring charges to those manipulating minors below the age of 18 into having sexual relations (Art. 274). For ages over 15, however, a lawsuit can be initiated only by a minor or the minor's parents, except when the minor has no parents or legal guardian, or where the accusation is brought against a parent or legal guardian (Art. 279).

== Suriname ==
The age of consent in Suriname is 16 for heterosexuals (altered from 14 in 2009).

The age of consent is 18 for homosexuals.

Although the legal age of sexual consent is 16 years old, it is not enforced effectively. The marriage law sets the age of marital consent at 15 years for girls and 17 years for boys, provided that parents of the parties agree to the marriage. Parental permission to marry is required up to the age of 21. The law also mandates the presence of a civil registry official to register all marriages.

== Venezuela ==
The age of consent in Venezuela is 16, regardless of gender or sexual orientation. Sexual acts with children are punished under Art. 375–379 of the penal code. Furthermore, consensual sex with a woman aged 16–21 can be punished if the woman was "seduced" under a false promise of marriage, and had she be "known to be honest" (Art. 379).

Sex with a child under age 12 is punished with 5–10 years' imprisonment, the same as that for non-consensual sex with an adult through violence or threats. The threshold is raised to children under 16 years if the offender is a parent, guardian, teacher, or other person in a position of authority over the victim (Art. 375). The penalty is raised to 6–12 years for an abuse of trust (Art. 376). Lewd acts can bring 6–30 months’ imprisonment if the child is under 12, (Art. 377), or 6–18 months for a child aged 13–15 (Art. 379), with greater punishments under an abuse of trust.

== See also ==
- Age-of-consent reform
- Age of consent
- Age of consent by country
- Ages of consent in Africa
- Ages of consent in Asia
- Ages of consent in Europe
- Ages of consent in North America
- Ages of consent in Oceania
- Comprehensive sex education
- LGBT rights in Suriname
- LGBT rights in the Americas
- Sex education
