= An Act to amend the Criminal Code (protection of children and other vulnerable persons) and the Canada Evidence Act =

Parliament of Canada
- Long title: An Act to amend the Criminal Code (Protection of Children and Other Vulnerable Persons) and the Canada Evidence Act
- Citation: S.C. 2005, c. 32
- Considered by: House of Commons of Canada
- Considered by: Senate of Canada

Legislative history

Initiating chamber: House of Commons of Canada
- Bill citation: Bill C-2
- Introduced by: Irwin Cotler MP, Minister of Justice
- First reading: October 8, 2004
- Second reading: October 18, 2004
- Third reading: June 9, 2005

Revising chamber: Senate of Canada
- Member(s) in charge: Landon Pearson
- First reading: June 14, 2005
- Second reading: June 20, 2005
- Third reading: July 19, 2005
- Status: Current legislation

An Act to amend the Criminal Code (Protection of Children and Other Vulnerable Persons) and the Canada Evidence Act (French: Loi modifiant le Code criminel (protection des enfants et d’autres personnes vulnérables) et la Loi sur la preuve au Canada) is an act of the Parliament of Canada passed in 2005. The Act amended several statutes related to the consent of sexual acts, sexual offences, and child abuse.

The Act amended Section 153 of the Criminal Code to additionally prohibit the sexual touching of a person under the age of 18 if they are "in a relationship with a young person that is exploitative of the young person", increased various penalties related to child abuse, made voyeurism an offence, and expands the definition of child pornography to include audio recordings and writings "whose dominant characteristic is the description, for a sexual purpose, of sexual activity with a person under the age of eighteen years."

== Legislative history ==
The legislation was first introduced as Bill C-20 to the House of Commons on 5 December, 2002 in the second session of the 37th Canadian Parliament by Minister of Justice Martin Cauchon. It had not had its third reading when Parliament was prorogued in November 2003.

It was re-introduced as Bill C-12 in the third session of the 37th Parliament on 12 February, 2004. Bill C-12 was deemed approved at all stages completed in the previous session, and passed in the House on 12 May but was not approved by the Senate at the time of prorogation on 23 May.

The bill was re-introduced for a third time as Bill C-2 on 8 October, 2004 in the first session of the 38th Canadian Parliament. After moving from the House of Commons to the Senate, after its first Senate reading on 14 June, 2005 it was amended two days later, four days prior to its second Senate reading on 20 June, where it was passed.

== See also ==
- Canadian bills
