= Adolescent sexuality in Canada =

- Focus: Teen sexual health, behaviour, and education
- Region: Canada
- Related topics: Sex education in Canada, teenage pregnancy, LGBTQ youth in Canada

Adolescent sexuality in Canada is not as well documented as adolescent sexuality in the United States; despite the proximity of the two nations, Canada has its own unique culture and generalizations about Canadian adolescent sexuality based on American research can be misleading. Because of this, several surveys and studies have been conducted which acquired information on Canadian adolescent sexuality. Surveys which provide this information include the Canadian Community Health Survey (CCHS), the National Population Health Survey (NPHS) and the National Longitudinal Survey of Children and Youth (NLSCY). According to information drawn from the Canadian Community Health Survey and the National Population Health Survey, in 2005 43% of teens aged 15 to 19 reported that they had had sexual intercourse at least once (down from 47% in 1996–1997).

Canadian data on sexual health is scarce; therefore, trend analysis and international comparisons are limited. Existing data shows that, overall, Canadian adolescents are taking more measures to protect their sexual health. However, challenges such as sexually transmitted infections, homophobia and inadequate sexual health education persist.

Although there is a lack of research on the effects of mass media which is specific to Canadian adolescents, studies have been conducted in similar cultures (such as the United States). The media has a reciprocal relationship with sexual behavior, and the type of influence differs by gender. Since Canada has a unique culture, some research findings may not apply.

Adolescents are exposed to diverse conditions and factors influencing their daily lives. Societal conditions, culture, the neighbourhood, family members, parents and peers interact with the adolescent, and adolescent sexuality is shaped by these factors. Research has not looked at the Canadian adolescent, so findings are inferred from those in other countries and may not represent the diverse Canadian culture. Research needs to be conducted in Canada, to provide an accurate picture of adolescent sexuality in Canada.

== Sexual behaviour ==
=== Sexual intercourse ===
Garriguet's (2005) analysis of the National Longitudinal Survey of Children and Youth found that by age 14 or 15, about 13% of Canadian adolescents have had sexual intercourse. Young adolescents in the eastern provinces and Quebec were more likely to report being sexually active than were those in Ontario and the west.

Rotermann's review of the NPHS and CCHS found that in 2005, 43% of nationally surveyed teens aged 15 to 19 reported that they had had sexual intercourse at least once; these numbers were higher in Quebec and increasing between surveys in Nova Scotia. She also found that the number of adolescents who had sexual intercourse before the age of 15 had dropped from 12% in 1996–1997 to 8% in 2005.

=== Contraceptive use ===
In the Canadian Youth, Sexual Health and HIV/AIDS Survey created by Boyce and colleagues, it was found that among students in grades 9 and 11 between 2002 and 2003, 84% to 90% of males and females who had ever had intercourse reported being protected from pregnancy by using a combined oral contraceptive pill, a condom or both the last time they engaged in sexual intercourse. This survey was conducted nationally, representing every province except Nunavut.

In 2005, the percentage of adolescents aged 15 to 19 who reported that they had used a condom the last time they had sex was significantly higher in Prince Edward Island, Nova Scotia and Alberta and significantly lower in Quebec, compared with the national average. Nova Scotia was the only province in which condom use among adolescents increased significantly between 2003 and 2005.

=== Northeastern British Columbia ===
Because of the presence of the oil industry, a study examined how a large population of transient, mostly male oil workers nearby affected adolescent sexuality in the nearby community of Fort St. John. The study was conducted because in 2005, northeastern British Columbia experienced a 10% increase in the incidence of chlamydia infections, exceeding the provincial average by 38%.

Goldenberg and colleagues' (2005) ethnography identified the mobility of the oil–gas workforce, binge partying, a high level of disposable income and gender–power dynamics as the main social, cultural, and structural factors affecting adolescent sexual behaviour in Fort St. John.

=== Northern Nova Scotia ===
Langille, Hughes, Murphy, and Rigby's study of 15- to 19-year-old students was conducted in four Nova Scotia schools, using a cross-sectional self-report study to identify their sexual activity and risk behaviours. Langille and colleagues' survey found that the Nova Scotia adolescents studied were as sexually active as those studied nationally and provincially.

A noteworthy point was that 13% of the young women lacked effective contraception at last intercourse (compared to 11% nationally), which may indicate a need to increase sexual health education in the region.

== Surveys ==
Several surveys have been conducted in Canada examining a wide range of health-related topics, including surveys providing information about adolescent sexuality in the country.

=== National Population Health Survey ===
The National Population Health Survey began its first 12-month cycle of data collection in early June 1994, and continues to do so every other year. This survey is a major part of the effort to improve the information available on health policies and programs in Canada during a period of economic downturn and budgetary pressure on the health-care system.

The survey produces both periodic cross-sectional information to monitor programs and longitudinal data to improve understanding of what determines good health.

=== Canadian Community Health Survey ===
In 1991, the National Task Force on Health Information pointed out a number of problems with information on Canada's health system. Responding to these concerns, the Canadian Institute for Health Information (CIHI), Statistics Canada and Health Canada joined in creating a Health Information Roadmap (the mandate eventually resulting in the creation of the Canadian Community Health Survey).

The Canadian Community Health Survey (or CCHS) is a cross-sectional survey collecting information on health status, health-care utilization and health determinants for the population. It draws from a large sample of the Canadian population, and is designed to provide reliable estimates at the regional level. The CCHS was created to accomplish the following objectives:

- Support health-surveillance programs by providing data at the national, provincial and intra-provincial levels
- Provide a single data source for health research on small populations and rare characteristics
- Timely releases information easily accessible to a diverse community of users
- Create a flexible survey instrument (including a rapid-response option) to address emerging issues related to the health of the population

=== National Longitudinal Survey of Children and Youth ===
The National Longitudinal Survey of Children and Youth (NLSCY) is a long-term study of Canadian children which follows their development and well-being from birth to early adulthood. Begun in 1994, it is jointly conducted by Statistics Canada and Human Resources and Skills Development Canada.

The study has been designed to collect information about factors influencing a child's social, emotional and behavioural development, and to monitor the impact of these factors on the child's development over time. The survey covers a comprehensive range of topics, including the health of children; information on their physical development, learning and behaviour and information about their social environment (family, friends, schools and communities).

== Sexual health ==
For many Canadians the first sexual activities occur during adolescence, making it the time frame receiving the most attention from sexual health researchers. Compared to previous generations, the majority of contemporary Canadian adolescents are taking more precautions for their sexual health (by increased contraceptive use and seeking abortion when necessary). Trends resulting from such behaviours are declines in pregnancy and the birth rate. Researchers state that behaviours encouraging sexual health can prevent problems such as sexually transmitted diseases and sexual assault. More importantly, it promotes satisfying relationships and a positive sense of self.

=== Comparisons with similar countries ===
A 2001 study by Maticka-Tyndale analyzed the sexual health status of Canadian adolescents in comparison to other developed countries. Canadian rates of teenage pregnancy and birth appeared more favorable than those of the United States, and about the same as Australia, England, and Scotland. However, Canada's statistics are less favourable than the northern European countries when comparing teen birth rates, improvements and research. Countries such as Sweden and France already have low pregnancy rates, and are experiencing greater decreases than Canada. Canada is also behind the United States, England, France and Sweden in research to improve current policies. Maticka-Tyndale states in her research that Canada tends to borrow data from similar countries, in the belief that those statistics also apply to its own citizens.

=== Sexually transmitted diseases ===
Research on sexually transmitted diseases shows that older infections (such as syphilis) are close to elimination in Canada. Taking their place are diseases such as chlamydia and human papillomavirus (HPV), affecting women more than men. Both male and female adolescents tend to overestimate the prevalence of HIV, and underestimate that of the commoner HPV and chlamydia. Although Canada has fewer sexually active teens than Great Britain, France and Sweden, it has the same rate of teen pregnancy and gonorrhea and a higher rate of chlamydia. The chlamydia rate in Canada is highest among those aged 15 to 24; this indicates a further need for self-protection on the part of Canadian teenagers. In addition, long-term adolescent relationships result in a reduced use of condoms and reliance on other contraceptive methods, increasing the risk of STD. Current levels of STDs are an area of concern among sexual health service providers in Canada.

=== Sexual abuse ===
Several small-scale and regional studies in Canada have found that female and gay adolescents experience forms of sexual abuse such as unwanted sexual comments and sexual harassment. Adolescents who are gay, lesbian or transgender continue to face harassment and violence in their schools. Canadian studies have found that these sexual minorities feel higher levels of distrust among health and social service providers. These adolescents have difficulty accessing available sexual health services due to homophobia on the part of Canadian people and institutions. The victim of sexual abuse typically knows their perpetrator. More importantly, sexual abuse is a predictor of behaviors such as intercourse at a younger age and non-use of condoms.

=== Sexual health awareness ===
Studies of adolescent sexual health awareness in Canada show that teenagers are finding inadequacies in the quality of sexual health information provided them. Online interviews conducted in 2005 by the Canadian Association for Adolescent Health revealed that teenagers lacked extensive knowledge on sexually transmitted diseases and their consequences. Seventy-six percent of mothers who also completed the survey reported that they were unable to find all the sexual health information they needed to help their children. Two areas adolescents and mothers agreed lacked information were partner abuse and the emotional aspects of sexuality. Canadian adolescents felt that information sources such as sex-education classes focused too closely on the physiological aspects of teenage sexuality (sexual dysfunction, for example). They suggested topics such as the transmission (and prevention) of sexually transmitted diseases, accurate information about HIV/AIDS, the emotional aspects of sexuality, relationship issues, communication with partners and gender differences. DiCenso and colleagues also revealed the barriers adolescents find to obtaining useful sexual health information, including limited service availability, lack of confidentiality, lack of privacy, and judgmental or negative school educators. They felt that they could learn the most from sex educators who were specially trained in sexual health, were non-judgmental, respectful to various concerns, sex-positive, and used humor and demonstrations where appropriate. Combinations of same-sex and co-ed classes were also suggested.

=== Trends ===
Other trends concerning sexual health in Canadian adolescents involve social factors. Canadian adolescents with the poorest sexual health tend to live in low-income families, in isolated and rural areas, and in provinces and territories with greater concentrations of rural and aboriginal populations. Adolescents who have sex at an earlier age tend to have low academic achievement, come from lower-income households, and are born in Canada. Students who had intercourse were more likely to have friends who did likewise. Boyce and colleagues surveyed a sample of students from grades 7, 9, and 11 with the Canadian Youth, Sexual Health and HIV/AIDS Survey and found that the reasons given most for having sex for girls was "love for the person" and for boys was "curiosity and experimentation". Females were two to three times more likely to report being pressured into having sex, or having unwanted sex.

=== Need for improvement ===
In Canada and the United States, adolescent sexuality is often presented negatively; the concern is that opening up these topics with teenagers will encourage them to partake in those activities. Researchers suggest the western European way of approaching sexual health, in which it is accepted that teenagers will have sex. They focus sexual health information on teaching the values of responsibility and respect for themselves and others, along with techniques of safety and pleasure. Researchers also suggest that Canada should consider factors unique to its rural and aboriginal populations. They advise models of sexual health care relating to differences in ethnicity, sexual orientation and religion of its citizens. Studies agree that areas of Canadian sexual health need improvement, including increasing adolescents' understanding of sexually transmitted diseases, expanding sexual health to include emotions and relationships, and making sexual health services and information accessible to people of all races, economic statuses, disability statuses and sexual orientations.

== Media ==
=== Television ===
Perception of peers' sexual attitudes and behaviour can increase the amount of sexual content watched by adolescents; this, in turn, can influence sexual behavior. Believing that one's friends approve of sexual activity and have a high level of non-coital sexual experience predicts heavier viewing of sexual material, relative to other types of television. Collins and colleagues found a relationship between the amount of sexual content in television viewed and sexual behavior in adolescents. Adolescents who viewed one standard deviation more sexual content than average showed sexual behavior similar to adolescents, 9 to 17 months older, who viewed an average amount of sexual programming. Adolescents who viewed the highest level of televised sexual content doubled the likelihood of initiating intercourse within the following year, compared to adolescents who viewed average amounts. However, the inability to control for prior interest in sex before television viewing may affect the accuracy of the results.

Steinberg and Monahan questioned the statistical method in the study by Collins and colleagues. In response Collins, Martino, Elliott and Miu reanalyzed the data with propensity score matching. The effects from the reanalysis were not as large as the original data, but were within range. Collins and colleagues concluded that the association does not prove causality, but is sufficient to warrant caution by parents of adolescents.

Parental mediation of adolescents' television viewing is a significant factor in countering sexual media influence. Restrictive mediation involves implementing rules and limits for the amount, type, and occasions on which television can be viewed. Restrictive mediation is negatively related to adolescents' intention to engage in sexual intercourse in the future. This type of parental limitation was also positively associated with increased expectations of negative health consequences following sexual intercourse. Parental mediation can be a moderating influence on the effects of sexual television, but longitudinal studies are needed to examine the long-term effects. Individual differences also influence the impact of televised sexual content on adolescents' sexual behavior. Adolescents who identify with television characters engaging in sexual behavior are more likely to develop confidence in their own ability to engage in these actions, compared to adolescents who do not identify with these television characters. This relationship is only seen when television characters have a successful outcome in their sexual pursuits. Therefore, in addition to the amount of media exposure, interpersonal variation (such as viewer identification with television characters) plays an important role in determining the influence of television on adolescent sexual behavior.

=== Other media ===
Brown and colleagues support the previous findings of exposure to sexual content in media accelerating adolescents' sexual activity. In addition to television, they examined the effects of movies, music, and magazines. Adolescents aged 12 to 14 who have more exposure to sexual content in media are more likely to engage in sexual activity two years later, compared to adolescents with lighter exposure to sexual media. In addition, Brown and colleagues found differences in race; the relationship between sexual media and sexual behavior was only seen for Caucasian adolescents. They hypothesized that African-American youth may have already formed expectations about sexual behavior, and are therefore less affected by sexual media. Despite the findings, the lack of internet analysis as a source of sexual content in media is a major limitation.

Adolescents' use of sexually explicit internet material has been studied by Peter and Valkenburg, who found that over one year, adolescents' use of sexually explicit internet material increased cognitive engagement in sexual issues. The frequency of viewing sexually explicit internet material correlates positively with adolescents' interest in sex, time spent thinking about sex and the frequency of distraction by sexual thoughts. This suggests a possible feedback loop, in which viewing sexually explicit websites increases adolescents' thinking about sex (which may, in turn, lead to viewing more sexually explicit websites). Statistics show that more than 50% of adolescents have visited a sexually explicit website. Adolescents who visit sexually explicit websites are more likely to engage in high-risk sexual behaviour such as having multiple partners, substance use during sex and lack of condom use. In addition, adolescents frequently viewing sexually explicit websites have more sexually permissive attitudes and a higher acceptance of casual sex, compared to those who view these websites less frequently. Viewing sexually explicit websites has a positive correlation with adolescents' sexual behaviors and attitudes, but the direction of the relationship has not yet been determined.

=== Seeking sexual content ===
Bleakley, Hennessy, and Fishbein investigated the extent to which adolescents seek out sexual media. Results showed gender differences in the amount of sexual-content seeking, with males reporting more seeking than females. Seeking sexual content correlated positively with pre-coital behavior and relationship experience at a higher level for males compared to females of the same age (younger males in particular). This suggests that sexual media exerts a larger effect on relationship behaviors in younger males. Gender differences were greatest for internet pornography and movies, and may be due to varying motivations for seeking sexual content. The researchers suggest that actively seeking out sexual content in media may be related to an adolescent's sexual behavior. The idea of differences in adolescents who seek out sexual content in media is explored further in a study by Bleakley and colleagues; results from the cross-sectional component demonstrated that sexual behavior and exposure to sex in the media are both cause and effect. Analysis showed more variance in sexual behavior than in exposure to sexual media, indicating that individual differences influence the seeking of sexual content. For example, sexually active youth may seek out sexual media for different reasons, ranging from information-gathering to seeking validation for their behaviour. Bleakley and colleagues found a feedback loop, in which sexually active adolescents are more likely to be exposed to sexual media and vice versa.

=== Media influence ===
Research by Bleakley, Hennessy, Fishbein, and Jordan expands on previous studies by looking at how exposure to sexual media influences adolescent sexual behavior. Behavior is primarily determined by intentions; intentions are determined by attitudes, perceived normative pressure, and self-efficacy. The results showed that adolescent sexual behavior is primarily determined by positive attitudes towards sex, secondarily determined by perceived normative pressure to engage in sex, followed by self-efficacy for having sex. Exposure to sexual media has the largest correlation with perceived normative pressure, which is not the primary determinant of adolescent sexual behavior.

== Culture, family and peers ==
Adolescent sexuality is influenced by a range of factors that are related, but not easily clustered together. The sexual behaviour of the adolescent is controlled by their culture and influenced by their family, parents and peers. There are three sexual cultures: restrictive, semi-restrictive and permissive. Depending on their sexual culture, the adolescent learns and is influenced by cultural and societal dynamics. The United States and Canada are semi-restrictive sexual cultures; however, Canada is considered less restrictive than the United States.

=== Sexual cultures ===
A restrictive sexual culture disapproves of premarital sex, and creates rules to prevent such behaviour; some groups separate boys and girls to prevent sexual contact. Less-restrictive cultures make their disapproval known, and educate young people to avoid premarital sex; an example is India. In many cases, in this culture there are rigid gender roles; girls are expected to be "gatekeepers" of their virginity (and sexuality in general).

Semi-restrictive cultures also disapprove of premarital sex; however, the rules are not as strict. Adults in these cultures tend to ignore promiscuous behaviour until the girl becomes pregnant. If this happens, the couple is expected to marry. The United States and Canada are examples of semi-restrictive cultures. Adolescents know that premarital sex is not desirable; however, they engage in it and parents pretend they do not know about their children's activities.

Permissive cultures expect sexual relations before marriage, and may encourage them. An example of this culture would encourage sexuality from a young age and would be open communication about sex between the children and parents. The people of the Trobriand Island in the South Pacific fit this description.

=== Cultural role ===
Culture plays a significant role in whether an adolescent engages in sexual activity. Killoren, Updegraff, Christopher and Umaña-Taylor found that teenagers from Mexican families who were born in the United States are more influenced by their peers in their choice of sexual activity than were those born in Mexico; those born in Mexico were more grounded in Mexican culture. Different cultures endorse and understand sexual behaviour differently. Among the people of the Trobriand Islands in the South Pacific, "children begin having sex at an early age and their sexual relationships blossom during the adolescent years".

=== Societal factors ===
Societal factors (such as family structure, parental style and monitoring) play a role in the type and timeline of sexual behaviour. The family is an important structure in the adolescent's life; it provides values and beliefs about marriage, love and sex, and is the base of the relationships that they will have in later life. Parental monitoring and communication are essential. Parent-child communication "about sex also was significantly and negatively associated with consistent versus inconsistent condom use". The composition of the household plays a critical role in adolescent sexuality. Adolescents from single-parent households (mostly single mothers) are more likely to engage in premarital sex than adolescents from two-parent households. Coley, Medeiros and Schindler investigated the impact of family on adolescent sexual behaviour, concluding that "regular family activities may buffer adolescents, whereas negative parenting behaviors may increase adolescents' engagement in sexual risk behaviors". Parents are both a source of information about sexual behaviour and models of what is accepted and what is not. The neighbourhood is another societal factor; it has been found that the "neighborhood context may be positively or negatively associated with sexual initiation, depending on gender". The neighbourhood may also reflect higher levels of social control.

=== Parents ===
Since parents are role models for their children, it is critical to understand parental behaviour in the context of adolescent sexuality. Unsafe parental behaviour (such as smoking) are linked to adolescent engagement in risky behaviour. The fact that a parent smokes increases the likelihood of an adolescent engaging in problem behaviour, including risky sexual behaviour. The idea that risk is reproduced in generations is evident; parental behaviour is mirrored by the adolescent. Kim, Schooler and Sorsoli demonstrated "that adolescents' perceptions of parental caring are an important mechanism in the association between parental television involvement and adolescents' self-esteem, body image and sexuality". Parental involvement is desirable when viewing sexual behaviour on TV; the shared experience enables parents to clarify what is seen. Parents and peers both influence adolescent sexuality.

=== Peers ===
In adolescence, peers are important because they enable a teenager to form a sense of identity. Peers allow the adolescent to compare themselves socially (either positively or negatively). Since peer acceptance is important, adolescents want to do the same activities their friends are doing. Downward and upward comparison permits the adolescent to see what they need to do to be on the same level as their peers. Brown found that "peer norms have been shown to influence adolescent sexual (behaviour)"; these norms may be pro-social or anti-social. Killoren and colleagues demonstrate that teens with deviant peers will engage in sexual activities earlier (and for reasons that may be understood to be wrong in that society). Cohen, Meade and Prinstein (2003) found that the perception of a best friend's sexual behaviour has a significant impact on the adolescent's own sexual behaviour. In addition, the researchers found that adolescents with a high level of sexual activity were perceived to be popular. Popularity and acceptance is crucial at this stage of life; Bauermeister, Elkington, Brackis-Cott, Dolezal and Mellins established that if "the number of peers believing that sexually-active girls were cool and popular" was high, this perception led to more engagement in sexual intercourse. There are visible gender differences; boys do not seem to be affected as much as girls. "Girls were more likely to report engaging in penetrative sex if a greater number of peers perceived sexually active girls were cool or popular". These differences become the norm for sexual behaviour.

== See also ==
- Ages of consent in North America § Canada
