= Adolescent sexuality =

Stage of human development

Adolescent sexuality is a stage of human development in which adolescents experience and explore sexual feelings. Interest in sexuality intensifies during the onset of puberty, and sexuality is often a vital aspect of teenagers' lives. Sexual interest may be expressed in a number of ways, such as flirting, kissing, masturbation, or having sex with a partner. Sexual interest among adolescents, as among adults, can vary greatly, and is influenced by cultural norms and mores, sex education, as well as comprehensive sexuality education provided, sexual orientation, and social controls such as age-of-consent laws.

Sexual activity in general is associated with various risks and this is heightened by the unfamiliar excitement of sexual arousal, the attention connected to being sexually attractive, and the new level of physical intimacy and psychological vulnerability created by sexual encounters. The risks of sexual intercourse include unwanted pregnancy and contracting a sexually transmitted infection such as HIV/AIDS, which can be reduced with availability and use of a condom or adopting other safe sex practices. Contraceptives specifically reduce the chance of teenage pregnancy.

== Development of sexuality ==
Adolescent sexuality begins at puberty. The sexual maturation process produces sexual interest and stimulates thought processes. Subsequent sexual behavior starts with the secretion of hormones from the hypothalamus and anterior pituitary gland. These hormones target the sexual organs and begin their maturation. Increasing levels of androgen and estrogen have an effect on the thought processes of adolescents and have been described as being in the minds "of almost all adolescents a good deal of the time".

Though most female adolescents begin their sexual maturation process in normal, predictable ways, there may be concerns by parents and clinicians if the following become evident:

- painful menstruation
- chronic pelvic pain
- partial vaginal outflow obstruction/imperforate hymen
- possible anatomical defects

== Views on sexual activity ==
One study from 1996 documented the interviews of a sample of junior high school students in the United States. The girls were less likely to state that they ever had sex than adolescent boys. Among boys and girls who had experienced sexual intercourse, the proportion of girls and boys who had recently had sex and were regularly sexually active was the same. Those conducting the study speculated that fewer girls say they have ever had sex because girls viewed teenage parenthood as more of a problem than boys. Girls were thought to be more restricted in their sexual attitudes; they were more likely than boys to believe that they would be able to control their sexual urges. Girls had a more negative association in how being sexually active could affect their future goals. In general, girls said they felt less pressure from peers to begin having sex, while boys reported feeling more pressure.

A later study questioned the attitudes of adolescents. When asked about abstinence, many girls reported they felt conflicted. They were trying to balance maintaining a good reputation with trying to maintain a romantic relationship and wanting to behave in adult-like ways. Boys viewed having sex as social capital. Many boys believed that their male peers who were abstinent would not as easily climb the social ladder as sexually active boys. Some boys said that for them, the risks that may come from having sex were not as bad as the social risks that could come from remaining abstinent.

=== Concepts about loss of virginity ===
In the United States, federally mandated programs started in 1980 and promoted adolescent abstinence from sexual intercourse, which resulted in teens turning to oral sex, which about a third of teens considered a form of abstinence in a study.

Until their first act of sexual intercourse, adolescents generally see virginity in one of the following ways: as a gift, a stigma, or a normal step in development. Girls typically think of virginity as a gift, while boys think of virginity as a stigma. In interviews, girls said that they viewed giving someone their virginity as like giving them a very special gift. Because of this, they often expected something in return such as increased emotional intimacy with their partners or the virginity of their partner. However, they often felt disempowered because of this; they often did not feel like they actually received what they expected in return and this made them feel like they had less power in their relationship. They felt that they had given something up and did not feel like this action was recognized.

Thinking of virginity as a stigma disempowered many boys because they felt deeply ashamed and often tried to hide the fact that they were virgins from their partners, which for some resulted in their partners teasing them and criticizing them about their limited sexual techniques. The girls who viewed virginity as a stigma did not experience this shaming. Even though they privately thought of virginity as a stigma, these girls believed that society valued their virginity because of the stereotype that women are sexually passive. This, they said, made it easier for them to lose their virginity once they wanted to because they felt society had a more positive view on female virgins and that this may have made them sexually attractive. Thinking of losing virginity as part of a natural developmental process resulted in less power imbalance between boys and girls because these individuals felt less affected by other people and were more in control of their individual sexual experience. Adolescent boys, however, were more likely than adolescent girls to view their loss of virginity as a positive aspect of their sexuality because it is more accepted by peers.

== Behavior ==
Prevalence of sexually experienced 15-year-olds
Country	Boys (%)	Girls (%)
Austria	21.7	17.9
Belgium	24.6	23
Canada	24.1	23.9
Croatia	21.9	8.3
England	34.9	39.9
Estonia	18.8	14.1
Finland	23.1	32.7
France	25.1	17.7
Greece	32.5	9.5
Hungary	25	16.3
Israel	31	8.2
Latvia	19.2	12.4
Lithuania	24.4	9.2
North Macedonia	34.2	2.7
Netherlands	23.3	20.5
Poland	20.5	9.3
Portugal	29.2	19.1
Scotland	32.1	34.1
Slovenia	45.2	23.1
Spain	17.2	13.9
Sweden	24.6	29.9
Switzerland	24.1	20.3
Ukraine	25.1	24
Wales	27.3	38.5

=== Birth control ===
In 2002, a survey was conducted in European nations about the sexual behavior of teenagers. In a sample of 15-year-olds from 24 countries, most participants self-reported that they had not experienced sexual intercourse. Among those who were sexually active, the majority (82.3%) had used contraception at last intercourse.

A nationally representative Danish study found that teenage girls who use the most common form of birth control pills, combination birth control pills with both estrogen and progestin, are 80% more likely to be prescribed an antidepressant than girls who were not taking birth control. Girls who take progestin-only pills are 120% more likely. The risk of depression is tripled for teenage girls who use non-oral forms of hormonal contraception.

=== Adolescent sexual functioning: gender similarities and differences ===
Lucia O'Sullivan and her colleagues studied adolescent sexual functioning: they compared an adolescent sample with an adult sample and found no significant differences between them. Desire, satisfaction and sexual functioning were generally high among their sample of participants (aged 15–21). Additionally, no significant gender differences were found in the prevalence of sexual dysfunction. In terms of problems with sexual functioning mentioned by participants in this study, the most common problems listed for males were experiencing anxiety about performing sexually (81.4%) and premature ejaculation (74.4%). Other common problems included issues becoming erect and difficulties with ejaculation. Generally, most problems were not experienced on a chronic basis. Common problems for girls included difficulties with sexual climax (86.7%), not feeling sexually interested during a sexual situation (81.2%), unsatisfactory vaginal lubrication (75.8%), anxiety about performing sexually (75.8%) and painful intercourse (25.8%). Most problems listed by the girls were not persistent problems. However, inability to experience orgasm seemed to be an issue that was persistent for some participants.

The authors detected four trends during their interviews: sexual pleasure increased with the amount of sexual experience the participants had; those who had experienced sexual difficulties were typically sex-avoidant; some participants continued to engage in regular sexual activity even if they had low interest; and lastly, many experienced pain when engaging in sexual activity if they experienced low arousal.

Another study found that it was not uncommon for adolescent girls in relationships to report they felt little desire to engage in sexual activity when they were in relationships. However, many girls engaged in sexual activity even if they did not desire it, in order to avoid what they think might place strains on their relationships. The researcher states that this may be because of society's pressure on girls to be "good girls"; the pressure to be "good" may make adolescent girls think they are not supposed to feel desire like boys do. Even when girls said they did feel sexual desire, they said that they felt like they were not supposed to, and often tried to cover up their feelings. This has been cited as an example of how societal expectations about gender can impact adolescent sexual functioning.

=== Gender disparities in oral sex among adolescents ===
There are gender differences in the giving and receiving of oral sex. One study demonstrated that young men expected to receive oral sex more than young women expected to receive it, with 43% of men and 20% of women expecting to receive it. Additionally more young men reported having oral-penis contact over oral-vulva contact with a different gender. Young men also receive more frequent oral sex than young women. One study with U.S. college students reported 62% of female participants were more likely to report giving oral sex more than they received it. However similar proportions of young men and women report having experienced oral sex.

=== By country ===
==== In Brazil ====
According to a 2007 study, the average age Brazilians lose their virginity is 17, the second-lowest number in the countries researched (first was Austria). They also ranked low at using condoms at their first time, at 47.9% (the study also found that people of lower socioeconomic status were more likely to use condoms). 58.4% of women reported that they lost their virginity in a committed relationship, versus only 18.9% of men. Brazil scored among the countries where people have the most positive feelings about their first time, with loss of virginity being associated with pleasure and an increase in maturity (in contrast with Japan, the country that reported the most negative feelings about losing their virginity).

In another research, leading the international ranking, 29.6% of Brazilian men lost their virginity before age 15 (versus 8.8% of women), but the average is really losing virginity at age 16.5 and marrying at age 24 for men, and losing virginity at age 18.5 and marrying at age 20 for women. These do not differ much from national figures. In 2005, 80% of then adolescents lost their virginity before their seventeenth birthday, and about 1 in each 5 new children in the country were born to an adolescent mother, where the number of children per women is solely 1.7 in average, below the natural replacement and the third lowest in independent countries of the Americas, after Canada and Cuba.

A 2013 report through national statistics of students of the last grade before high school, aged generally (86%) 13–15, found out 28.7% of them already had lost their virginity, with both demographics of 40.1% of boys and 18.3% of girls having reduced their rate since the last research, in 2009, that found the results as 30.5% overall, 43.7% for boys and 18.7% for girls. Further about the 2013 research, 30.9% of those studying in public schools were already sexually initiated, versus 18% in private ones; 24.7% of sexually initiated adolescents did not use a condom in their most recent sexual activity (22.9% of boys, 28.2% of girls), in spite of at the school environment 89.1% of them receiving orientation about STDs, 69.7% receiving orientation of where to acquire condoms for free (as part of a public health campaign from the Brazilian government) and 82.9% had heard of other forms of contraceptive methods.

==== In Canada ====
One group of Canadian researchers found a relationship between self-esteem and sexual activity. They found that students, especially girls, who were verbally abused by teachers or rejected by their peers were more likely than other students to have sex by the end of the Grade 7. The researchers speculate that low self-esteem increases the likelihood of sexual activity: "low self-esteem seemed to explain the link between peer rejection and early sex. Girls with a poor self-image may see sex as a way to become 'popular', according to the researchers".

==== In India ====
In India there is growing evidence that adolescents are becoming more sexually active. It is feared that this will lead to an increase in spread of HIV/AIDS among adolescents, increase the number of unwanted pregnancies and abortions, and give rise to conflict between contemporary social values. Adolescents have relatively poor access to health care and education. With cultural norms opposing extramarital sexual behavior, R.S. Goyal fears "these implications may acquire threatening dimensions for the society and the nation".

Motivation and frequency

Sexual relationships outside marriage are not uncommon among teenage boys and girls in India. In a random study of 100 couples, the best predictor of whether or not a girl would be having sex is if her friends were engaging in the same activities. For those girls whose friends were having a physical relationship with a boy, 84.4% were engaging in the same behavior. Only 24.8% of girls whose friends were not having a physical relationship had one themselves. In urban areas, 25.2% of girls have had intercourse and in rural areas 20.9% have. Better indicators of whether or not girls were having sex were their employment and school status. Girls who were not attending school were 14.2% (17.4% v. 31.6%) more likely to be having sex; for girls who were employed this number was 14.4% (36.0% v. 21.6%).

In the Indian sociocultural milieu girls have less access to parental love, schools, opportunities for self-development and freedom of movement than boys do. It has been argued that they may rebel against this lack of access or seek out affection through physical relationships with boys. While the data reflects trends to support this theory, it is inconclusive. The freedom to communicate with adolescent boys was restricted for girls regardless of whether they lived in an urban or rural setting, and regardless of whether they went to school or not. More urban girls than rural girls discussed sex with their friends. Those who did not may have felt "the subject of sexuality in itself is considered an 'adult issue' and a taboo or it may be that some respondents were wary of revealing such personal information."

Contraceptive use

Among Indian girls, Goyal claims that "misconceptions about sex, sexuality and sexual health were large. However, adolescents having sex relationships were somewhat better informed about the sources of spread of STDs and HIV/AIDS." While 40% of sexually active girls were aware that condoms could help prevent the spread of HIV/AIDS and reduce the likelihood of pregnancy, only 10.5% used a condom during the last time they had intercourse.

==== In the Netherlands ====
According to Advocates for Youth, the United States' teen pregnancy rate is over four times as much as it is in the Netherlands. In comparison, in the documentary, Let's Talk About Sex, a photographer named James Houston travels from Los Angeles to D.C. and to the Netherlands. In the Netherlands, he contrasts European and American attitudes about sex. From the HIV rates to the contemplations of teen parenthood in America, Houston depicts a society in which America and the Netherlands differ.

Most Dutch parents practice vigilant leniency, in which they have a strong familial bond and are open to letting their children make their own decisions.

Gezelligheid is a term used by many Dutch adolescents to describe their relationship with their family. The atmosphere is open and there is little that is not discussed between parents and children.

Amy Schalet, author of Not Under My Roof: Parents, Teens, and the Culture of Sex discusses in her book how the practices of Dutch parents strengthen their bonds with their children. Teenagers feel more comfortable about their sexuality and engage in discussion with their parents about it. A majority of Dutch parents feel comfortable allowing their teenagers to have their significant other spend the night.

== Same-sex attractions among adolescents ==
Adolescents who are attracted to others of the same sex are strongly affected by their surroundings in that adolescents often decide to express their sexualities or keep them secret depending on certain factors in their societies. These factors affect girls and boys differently. If girls’ schools and religions are against same sex attractions, they pose the greatest obstacles to girls who experience same sex attractions. These factors were not listed as affecting boys as much. Researchers suggest that maybe this is because not only are some religions against same-sex attraction, but they also encourage traditional roles for women and do not believe that women can carry out these roles as lesbians. Schools may affect girls more than boys because strong emphasis is placed on girls to date boys, and many school activities place high importance on heterosexuality (such as cheerleading). Additionally, the idea of not conforming to typical male gender roles inhibited many boys from openly expressing their same-sex attraction. The worry of conforming to gender roles did not inhibit girls from expressing their same-gender preferences as much, because society is generally more flexible about their gender expression.

Researchers such as Lisa Diamond are interested in how some adolescents depart from the socially constructed norms of gender and sexuality. She found that some girls, when faced with the option of choosing "heterosexual", "same-sex attracted" or "bisexual", preferred not to choose a label because their feelings do not fit into any of those categories.

== Sexually transmitted infections ==
Adolescents and young adults have the highest rates of sexually transmitted infections (STIs) when compared to older groups. Adolescents are more likely to have an infected partner and less likely to receive health care when an STI is suspected. They are also less likely to comply with the treatment for an STI. Coinfection is common among adolescents.

An STI can have a large negative physiological and psychological effect on adolescents. The goal of the pediatrician is for early diagnosis and treatment. Early treatment is important for preventing medical complications and infertility. Prevention of STIs should be a priority for all health care providers for adolescents. Diagnosis of an STI begins the evaluation of concomitant STIs and the notification and treatment of sexual partners. Some states in the US require the reporting of STIs to the state's health department.

== Media influence ==
Modern media contains more sexual messages than was true in the past and the effects on teen sexual behavior remain relatively unknown. Only 9% of the sex scenes on 1,300 of cable network programming discusses and deals with the potentially negative consequences of sexual behavior. The internet may further provide adolescents with poor information on health issues, sexuality, and sexual violence.

A study on examining sexual messages in popular TV shows found that 2 out of 3 programs contained sexually related actions. 1 out of 15 shows included scenes of sexual intercourse itself. Shows featured a variety of sexual messages, including characters talking about when they wanted to have sex and how to use sex to keep a relationship alive. Some researchers believe that adolescents can use these messages as well as the sexual actions they see on TV in their own sexual lives.

The results of a study by Deborah Tolman and her colleagues indicated that adolescent exposure to sexuality on television in general does not directly affect their sexual behaviors, rather it is the type of message they view that has the most impact. Gender stereotypes enacted in sexual scenes on TV were seen to have a large effect on adolescents. Girls felt they had less control over their sexuality when they saw men objectifying women and not valuing commitment. The study discussed the risk of women internalizing this message and spreading the idea that it is okay to be weak and answer to men all the time. However, girls who saw women on TV who refuted men's sexual advances usually felt more comfortable talking about their own sexual needs in their sexual experiences as well as standing up for themselves. They were comfortable setting sexual limits and therefore held more control over their sexuality. Findings for boys were less clear; those who saw dominant and aggressive men actually had fewer sexual experiences.

However some scholars have argued that such claims of media effects have been premature. Furthermore, according to US government health statistics, teens have delayed the onset of sexual intercourse in recent years, despite increasing amounts of sexual media.

A 2008 study wanted to find out if there was any correlation between sexual content shown in the media and teenage pregnancy. Research showed that teens who viewed high levels of sexual content were twice as likely to get pregnant within three years compared to those teens who were not exposed to as much sexual content. The study concluded that the way media portrays sex has a huge effect on adolescent sexuality.

=== Social media's role on adolescent sexuality ===
The impact of social media on adolescent sexuality is a multifaceted concern requiring ongoing research for a comprehensive understanding. Research suggests that exposure to sexual content on social media can influence adolescents' sexual attitudes, beliefs, and behaviors, given their vulnerable state during this developmental period when gender roles, sexual attitudes, and behaviors are actively being shaped. Studies have identified a positive association between high-frequency social media use and increased sexual risk behaviors among adolescents.

Exposure to sexual displays on social media sites has been linked to problematic beliefs and behaviors among both content creators and viewers, particularly affecting adolescents who are more susceptible to these effects and may encourage risky sexual behavior, associated with an increase in sexually transmitted infection rates and unintended pregnancies. Social media can have both positive and negative effects on the sexual orientation of children and adolescents. For instance, it may provide a safe space for sexual identity exploration and expression for LGBTQ+ youth, fostering connectivity, social support, and positive impacts on well-being. While early adopters of the LGBTQ+ identity within the youth use social media to understand their sexuality and connect with like-minded individuals, contributing to improved emotional support and development, it's important to note that social media can also expose youth to inaccurate and potentially harmful information about sexuality, perpetuate risky sexual behaviors, and provide anonymity to potential dangers, further covered in the proceeding sections.

== Teenage pregnancy ==
Adolescent girls become fertile following the menarche (first menstrual period), which normally occurs between age 11 to 12. After menarche, sexual intercourse (especially without contraception) can lead to pregnancy. The pregnant teenager may then miscarry, have an abortion, or carry the child to full term.

Pregnant teenagers face many of the same issues of childbirth as women in their 20s and 30s. However, there are additional medical concerns for younger mothers, particularly those under 15 and those living in developing countries. For example, obstetric fistula is a particular issue for very young mothers in poorer regions. For mothers between 15 and 19, risks are associated more with socioeconomic factors than with the biological effects of age. However, research has shown that the risk of low birth weight is connected to the biological age itself, as it was observed in teen births even after controlling for other risk factors (such as utilisation of antenatal care etc.).

Worldwide, rates of teenage births range widely. For example, sub-Saharan Africa has a high proportion of teenage mothers whereas industrialized Asian countries such as South Korea and Japan have very low rates. Teenage pregnancy in developed countries is usually outside of marriage, and carries a social stigma; teenage mothers and their children in developed countries show lower educational levels, higher rates of poverty, and other poorer "life outcomes" compared with older mothers and their children. In the developing world, teenage pregnancy is usually within marriage and does not carry such a stigma.

== Legal issues ==
Age of consent for heterosexual sex outside of marriage by country or territory. Age varies by state in Australia, Mexico and the United States. In China, Hong Kong is an exception, where the age of consent is 16, not 14 (wrong in the map). Puberty (only Nayarit, Mexico) 12 13 14 15 16 17 18 21 (only Bahrain) Must be married

Sexual conduct between adults/adolescents and adolescents younger than the local age of consent is generally illegal, aside from close-in-age exemptions or in jurisdictions where only sex between married couples is legal, such as those in some Islamic countries. In many jurisdictions, sexual intercourse between adolescents with a close age difference is not prohibited. Around the world, the average age-of-consent is 16, but this varies from being age 13 in Sudan, age 16 in Spain and Canada, and age 16–18 in the United States. In some jurisdictions, the age-of-consent for homosexual acts may be different from that for heterosexual acts. The age-of-consent in a particular jurisdiction is typically the same as the age of majority or several years younger. The age at which one can legally marry is also sometimes different from the legal age-of-consent.

Sexual relations with a person under the age-of-consent are generally a criminal offense in the jurisdiction in which the act was committed, with punishments ranging from token fines to life imprisonment. Many different terms exist for the charges laid and include statutory rape, illegal carnal knowledge, or corruption of a minor. In some jurisdictions, sexual activity with someone above the legal age-of-consent but beneath the age of majority can be punishable under laws against contributing to the delinquency of a minor.

In some countries marrying a person under the age of consent may make sex with that person legal regardless of the age of consent.

== Societal influence ==
=== Social constructionist perspective ===
The social constructionist perspective (see social constructionism for a general definition) on adolescent sexuality examines how power, culture, meaning and gender interact to affect the sexualities of adolescents. This perspective is closely tied to feminism and queer theory. Those who believe in the social constructionist perspective state that the current meanings most people in our society tie to female and male sexuality are actually a social construction to keep heterosexual and privileged people in power.

Researchers interested in exploring adolescent sexuality using this perspective typically investigates how gender, race, culture, socioeconomic status and sexual orientation affect how adolescent understand their own sexuality. An example of how gender affects sexuality is when young adolescent girls state that they believe sex is a method used to maintain relationships when boys are emotionally unavailable. Because they are girls, they believe they ought to engage in sexual behavior in order to please their boyfriends.

=== Developmental feminist perspective ===
The developmental feminist perspective is closely tied to the social constructionist perspective. It is specifically interested in how society's gender norms affect adolescent development, especially for girls. For example, some researchers on the topic hold the view that adolescent girls are still strongly affected by gender roles imposed on them by society and that this in turn affects their sexuality and sexual behavior. Deborah Tolman is an advocate for this viewpoint and states that societal pressures to be "good" cause girls to pay more attention to what they think others expect of them than looking within themselves to understand their own sexuality. Tolman states that young girls learn to objectify their own bodies and end up thinking of themselves as objects of desire. This causes them to often see their own bodies as others see it, which causes them to feel a sense of detachment from their bodies and their sexualities. Tolman calls this a process of disembodiment. This process leaves young girls unassertive about their own sexual desires and needs because they focus so much on what other people expect of them rather than on what they feel inside.

Another way gender roles affect adolescent sexuality is through the sexual double standard. This double standard occurs when others judge women for engaging in premarital sex and for embracing their sexualities, while men are rewarded for the same behavior. It is a double standard because the genders are behaving similarly, but are being judged differently for their actions because of their gender. An example of this can be seen in Tolman's research when she interviews girls about their experiences with their sexualities. In Tolman's interviews, girls who sought sex because they desired it felt like they had to cover it up in order (for example, they blamed their sexual behavior on drinking) not to be judged by others in their school. They were afraid of being viewed negatively for enjoying their sexuality. Many girls were thus trying to make their own solutions (like blaming their sexual behavior on something else or silencing their own desires and choosing not to engage in sexual behavior) to a problem that is actually caused by power imbalances between the genders within our societies. Other research showed that girls were tired of being judged for their sexual behavior because of their gender. However, even these girls were strongly affected by societal gender roles and rarely talked about their own desires and instead talked about how "being ready" (rather than experiencing desire) would determine their sexual encounters.

O'Sullivan and her colleagues assessed 180 girls between the ages of 12 and 14 on their perceptions on what their first sexual encounters would be like; many girls reported feeling negative emotions towards sex before their first time. The researchers think this is because adolescent girls are taught that society views adolescent pre-marital sex in negative terms. When they reported positive feelings, the most commonly listed one was feeling attractive. This shows how many girls objectify their own bodies and often think about this before they think of their own sexual desires and needs.

Researchers found that having an older sibling, especially an older brother, affected how girls viewed sex and sexuality. Girls with older brothers held more traditional views about sexuality and said they were less interested in seeking sex, as well as less interested in responding to the sexual advances of boys compared with girls with no older siblings. Researchers believe this is because older siblings model gender roles, so girls with older siblings (especially brothers) may have more traditional views of what society says girls and boys should be like; girls with older brothers may believe that sexual intercourse is mostly for having children, rather than for gaining sexual pleasure. This traditional view can inhibit them from focusing on their own sexualities and desires, and may keep them constrained to society's prescribed gender roles.

=== Social learning and the sexual self-concept ===
Developing a sexual self-concept is an important developmental step during adolescence. This is when adolescents try to make sense and organize their sexual experiences so that they understand the structures and underlying motivations for their sexual behavior. This sexual self-concept helps adolescents organize their past experiences, but also gives them information to draw on for their current and future sexual thoughts and experiences. Sexual self-concept affects sexual behavior for both men and women, but it also affects relationship development for women. Development of one's sexual self-concept can occur even before sexual experiences begin. An important part of sexual self-concept is sexual esteem, which includes how one evaluates their sexuality (including their thoughts, emotions and sexual activities). Another aspect is sexual anxiety; this includes one's negative evaluations of sex and sexuality. Sexual self-concept is not only developed from sexual experiences; both girls and boys can learn from a variety of social interactions such as their family, sexual education programs, depictions in the media and from their friends and peers. Girls with a positive self-schema are more likely to be liberal in their attitudes about sex, are more likely to view themselves as passionate and open to sexual experience and are more likely to rate sexual experiences as positive. Their views towards relationships show that they place high importance on romance, love and intimacy. Girls who have a more negative view often say they feel self-conscious about their sexuality and view sexual encounters more negatively. The sexual self-concept of girls with more negative views are highly influenced by other people; those of girls who hold more positive views are less so.

Boys are less willing to state they have negative feelings about sex than girls when they describe their sexual self-schemas. Boys are not divided into positive and negative sexual self-concepts; they are divided into schematic and non-schematic (a schema is a cluster of ideas about a process or aspect of the world; see schema). Boys who are sexually schematic are more sexually experienced, have higher levels of sexual arousal, and are more able to experience romantic feelings. Boys who are not schematic have fewer sexual partners, a smaller range of sexual experiences and are much less likely than schematic men to be in a romantic relationship.

When comparing the sexual self-concepts of adolescent girls and boys, researchers found that boys experienced lower sexual self-esteem and higher sexual anxiety. The boys stated they were less able to refuse or resist sex at a greater rate than the girls reported having difficulty with this. The authors state that this may be because society places so much emphasis on teaching girls how to be resistant towards sex, that boys do not learn these skills and are less able to use them when they want to say no to sex. They also explain how society's stereotype that boys are always ready to desire sex and be aroused may contribute to the fact that many boys may not feel comfortable resisting sex, because it is something society tells them they should want. Because society expects adolescent boys to be assertive, dominant and in control, they are limited in how they feel it is appropriate to act within a romantic relationship. Many boys feel lower self-esteem when they cannot attain these hyper-masculine ideals that society says they should. Additionally, there is not much guidance on how boys should act within relationships and many boys do not know how to retain their masculinity while being authentic and reciprocating affection in their relationships. This difficult dilemma is called the double-edged sword of masculinity by some researchers.

Hensel and colleagues conducted a study with 387 female participants between the ages of 14 and 17 and found that as the girls got older (and learned more about their sexual self-concept), they experienced less anxiety, greater comfort with sexuality and experienced more instances of sexual activity. Additionally, across the four years (from 14 to 17), sexual self-esteem increased, and sexual anxiety lessened. The researchers stated that this may indicate that the more sexual experiences the adolescent girls have had, the more confidence they hold in their sexual behavior and sexuality. Additionally, it may mean that for girls who have not yet had intercourse, they become more confident and ready to participate in an encounter for the first time. Researchers state that these patterns indicate that adolescent sexual behavior is not at all sporadic and impulsive, rather that it is strongly affected by the adolescent girls' sexual self-concept and changes and expands through time.

== Sex education ==
Sex education, also called "Sexuality Education" or informally "Sex Ed" is education about human sexual anatomy, sexual reproduction, sexual intercourse, human sexual behavior, and other aspects of sexuality, such as body image, sexual orientation, dating, and relationships. Common avenues for sex education are parents, caregivers, friends, school programs, religious groups, popular media, and public health campaigns.

Sexual education is not always taught the same in every country. For example, in France sex education has been part of school curricula since 1973. Schools are expected to provide 30 to 40 hours of sex education, and pass out condoms to students in grades eight and nine. In January, 2000, the French government launched an information campaign on contraception with TV and radio spots and the distribution of five million leaflets on contraception to high school students.

In Germany, sex education has been part of school curricula since 1970. Since 1992 sex education is by law a governmental duty. A survey by the World Health Organization concerning the habits of European teenagers in 2006 revealed that German teenagers care about contraception. The birth rate among German 15- to 19-year-olds is 11.7 per 1000 population, compared to 2.9 per 1000 population in Korea, and 55.6 per 1000 population in US.

According to SIECUS, the Sexuality Information and Education Council of the United States, in most families, parents are the primary sex educators of their adolescents. They found 93% of adults they surveyed support sexuality education in high school and 84% support it in junior high school. In fact, 88% of parents of junior high school students and 80% of parents of high school students believe that sex education in school makes it easier for them to talk to their adolescents about sex. Also, 92% of adolescents report that they want both to talk to their parents about sex and to have comprehensive in-school sex education.

In America, not only do U.S. students receive sex education within school or religious programs, but they are also educated by their parents. American parents are less prone to influencing their children's actual sexual experiences than they are simply telling their children what they should not do. Generally, they promote abstinence while educating their children with things that may make their adolescents not want to engage in sexual activity.

Almost all U.S. students receive some form of sex education at least once between grades 7 and 12; many schools begin addressing some topics as early as grade 5 or 6. However, what students learn varies widely, because curriculum decisions are quite decentralized. Two main forms of sex education are taught in American schools: comprehensive and abstinence-only. A 2002 study conducted by the Kaiser Family Foundation found that 58% of secondary school principals describe their sex education curriculum as comprehensive, while 34% said their school's main message was abstinence-only. The difference between these two approaches, and their impact on teen behavior, remains a controversial subject in the U.S. Some studies have shown abstinence-only programs to have no positive effects. Other studies have shown specific programs to result in more than 2/3 of students maintaining that they will remain abstinent until marriage months after completing such a program; such virginity pledges, however, are statistically ineffective, and over 95% of Americans do, in fact, have sex before marriage.

In Asia the state of sex education programs are at various stages of development. Indonesia, Mongolia, South Korea and Sri Lanka have a systematic policy framework for teaching about sex within schools. Malaysia, the Philippines and Thailand have assessed adolescent reproductive health needs with a view to developing adolescent-specific training, messages and materials. India has programs that specifically aim at school children at the age group of nine to sixteen years. These are included as subjects in the curriculum and generally involved open and frank interaction with the teachers. With the exceptions of Cambodia and Vietnam, the UNFPA funds most Asian sex education program. Bangladesh, Myanmar, Nepal and Pakistan have no coordinated sex education programs.

Some educators hold the view that sexuality is equated with violence. These educators think that not talking about sexuality will decrease the rate of adolescent sexuality. However, not having access to sexual education has been found to have negative effects upon students, especially groups such as adolescent girls who come from low-income families. Not receiving appropriate sexual health education increases teenage pregnancy, sexual victimization and high school dropout rates. Researchers state that it is important to educate students about all aspects of sexuality and sexual health to reduce the risk of these issues.

The view that sexuality is victimization teaches girls to be careful of being sexually victimized and taken advantage of. Educators who hold this perspective encourage sexual education, but focus on teaching girls how to say no, teaching them of the risks of being victims and educate them about risks and diseases of being sexually active. This perspective teaches adolescents that boys are predators and that girls are victims of sexual victimization. Researchers state that this perspective does not address the existence of desire within girls, does not address the societal variables that influence sexual violence and teaches girls to view sex as dangerous only before marriage. In reality, sexual violence can be very prevalent within marriages too.

Another perspective includes the idea that sexuality is individual morality; this encourages girls to make their own decisions, as long as their decision is to say no to sex before marriage. This education encourages self-control and chastity.

Lastly, the sexual education perspective of the discourse of desire is very rare in U.S. high schools. This perspective encourages adolescents to learn more about their desires, gaining pleasure and feeling confident in their sexualities. Researchers state that this view would empower girls because it would place less emphasis on them as the victims and encourage them to have more control over their sexuality.

Research on how gender stereotypes affect adolescent sexuality is important because researchers believe it can show sexual health educators how they can improve their programming to more accurately attend to the needs of adolescents. For example, studies have shown how the social constructed idea that girls are "supposed to" not be interested in sex have actually made it more difficult for girls to have their voices heard when they want to have safer sex. At the same time, sexual educators continuously tell girls to make choices that will lead them to safer sex, but do not always tell them ‘how’ they should go about doing this. Instances such as these show the difficulties that can arise from not exploring how society's perspective of gender and sexuality affect adolescent sexuality.

== Brain maturity ==
According to some studies, several brain regions in the frontal lobe of the cerebral cortex and in the hypothalamus that are deemed important for self-control, delayed gratification, risk analysis, and appreciation as well as the prefrontal cortex area of the human brain are not fully mature until the early 20s or about age 25. It is then argued that, partially because of this, young adolescents are generally less equipped than adults to make sound decisions and anticipate consequences of sexual behavior, although brain imaging and behavioral correlation studies on teenagers that characterize them as immature have been criticized for not being causative, thus possibly reaffirming cultural biases. Robert Epstein argues that "teen turmoil", which is blamed on differences in brain structure and function between adolescents and adults, is a relatively recent western phenomenon that is largely absent in pre-industrial societies and is a result of infantilization of teenagers rather than inherent brain differences. He reasons that if such incompetence and irresponsibility were truly a result of inherent brain differences, then it would be present in all societies and cultures. As a result, many studies and health organizations suggest that teens wait until they are emotionally ready to have sex or to wait until at least age 16.

== Historical research ==
In 1988, two researchers from the University of North Carolina, Ronald Rindfuss and J. Richard Udry, submitted a proposal to The National Institute of Child Health and Human Development (NICHD) to study the health-related risk behaviors of adolescents. The study was intended to collect data on the patterns of adolescent sexual behavior that could expose teenagers to sexually transmitted diseases. The researchers designed the study to capture data on a national sample of 24,000 youth from the seventh to the eleventh grade. The American Teen Study had initially been approved by both the National Advisory Council of the NICHD and by other NICHD officials, granting the study funding up to $2.5 million for the first year commencing in May 1991.

One month after the approval start date of the study, Secretary Louis Sullivan of Health and Human Services (HHS) cancelled the research study after having been questioned and berated by those that did not believe that research on adolescent sexual behaviors would be beneficial. According to Charrow (1991), this may have been the first time that a previously awarded amount of funding had been revoked. The American Teen Study sought to reveal the importance of investigating the health-related risk-taking behaviors of youth by gathering data across various social contexts such as at home and school. Countless critics had condemned the study by insisting that the issue of teen sex behaviors had been studied excessively.

Centers for Disease Control (1991) show that the age of first intercourse for American girls began to decrease from 1985 to 1989. The number of Massachusetts teens who reported engaging in sexual intercourse increased from 55% to 61% between the years 1986–1988. Moreover, it was found that the utilization of condoms by teenagers may decrease when they have multiple sexual partners. The authors (1993) state that the mathematical theory of epidemics reveals two factors about the rate of increasing infections during an epidemic: the first is the probability of an uninfected person contracting aids from an infected person. The transmission of a sexually transmitted disease such as HIV will depend on the sexual behaviors of individuals, their personal safety practices when engaging in sexual intercourse, and how often they are in contact with sexual partners.

The second factor is the number of uninfected individuals that are in the population. At the beginning of an epidemic, a sexually transmitted disease spreads when the uninfected partner of an infected person becomes highly sexually-active within the population, leading to an increase in the amount of those infected. As the population becomes more infected, an infected person will be less likely to encounter an uninfected one, leading to a decline in new infections. However, although the rate of new infections of HIV among older gay males has decreased, it is dangerous to say that the same pattern has been observed for gay adolescents. Similarly, data suggests that heterosexual adolescents also engage in anal intercourse which can lead to an increase in the number of infected persons. 10% of women at an adolescent planning center, 19% of female Canadian college students, and 25% of Black and Hispanic women at a family planning center all reported engaging in anal-intercourse with their partners.

The statistics suggest that there is an increasing need for research on the sexual risk-behaviors of adolescents. The current research on adolescent risk-taking sexual behaviors lack three fundamentals conditions that would give sufficient and generalizable data on the current sexual-behaviors of adolescents. The first is that the research studies need to have large samples and thorough designs to cover the diverse populations of adolescents that range from various genders, sexual orientations, ethnicities, races, and cultures. Second, there needs to be research that studies the interaction between various social contexts, such as riding in cars for enjoyment, and adolescent sexual-behaviors that leave youth susceptible to engaging in sexual-intercourse. Lastly, it would be necessary for repeated longitudinal studies on the sexual behaviors of adolescents as behaviors are constantly changing and may be open to different interpretations.

The American Teen Study would have been utilized to conduct the type of research that would be needed to investigate the increasing rate of sexually transmitted diseases among adolescents. The authors (1993) suggest that the cancellation of The American Teen Study was politically motivated as evidenced by Louis Sullivan's rushed rejection of the study without providing adequate reasoning for why the study should not have taken place. Without data from the study, it can be difficult for scientists to monitor the spread of sexually transmitted diseases such as HIV and to develop techniques to decrease the increasing rate of infections.

== See also ==
- Age disparity in sexual relationships
- Child sexuality
- Romeo and Juliet laws

By country

- Adolescent sexuality in Canada
- Adolescent sexuality in the United Kingdom
- Adolescent sexuality in the United States
