= Youth in Bangladesh =

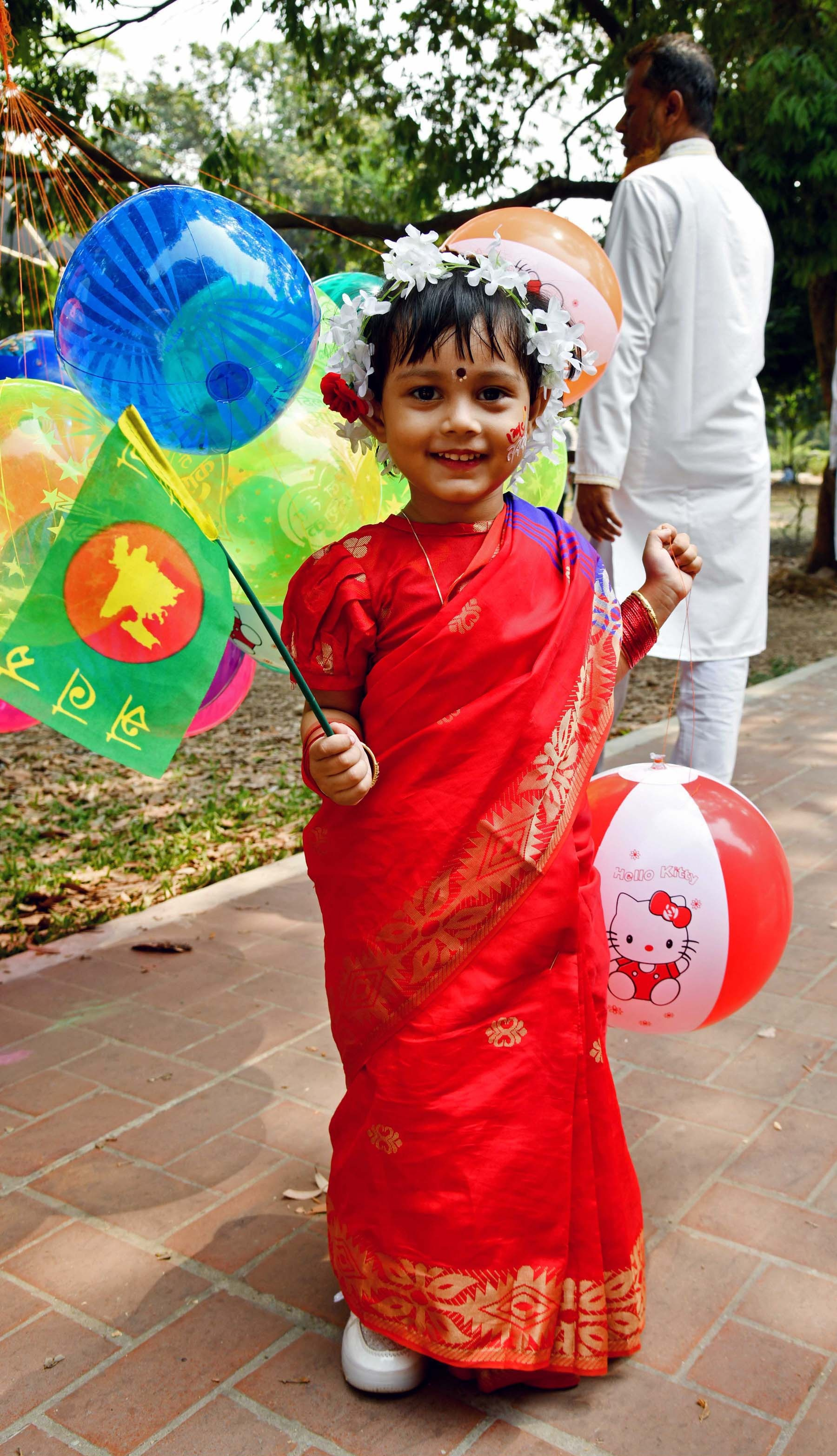
Bangladeshi (Bengali) Child

There are over 57 million children in Bangladesh. Although Bangladesh has an increasingly stable and growing economy, half of these children continue to live below the international poverty line. Protection, health, education, nutrition, safe water, and hygiene are considered basic rights for all children, yet children in Bangladesh face issues on all these fronts. 26 million children live below the national poverty line. Bangladesh has one of the highest rates of child marriage in the world. 66% of women (aged 20 to 24) were married before they turned 18. 13% of children are involved in child labor. Child laborers are frequently denied an education and are vulnerable to violence and abuse. Less than 80% of students enrolled in first grade complete primary school. High dropout rates and poor-quality teaching and learning are serious problems for primary schools.

== Education ==
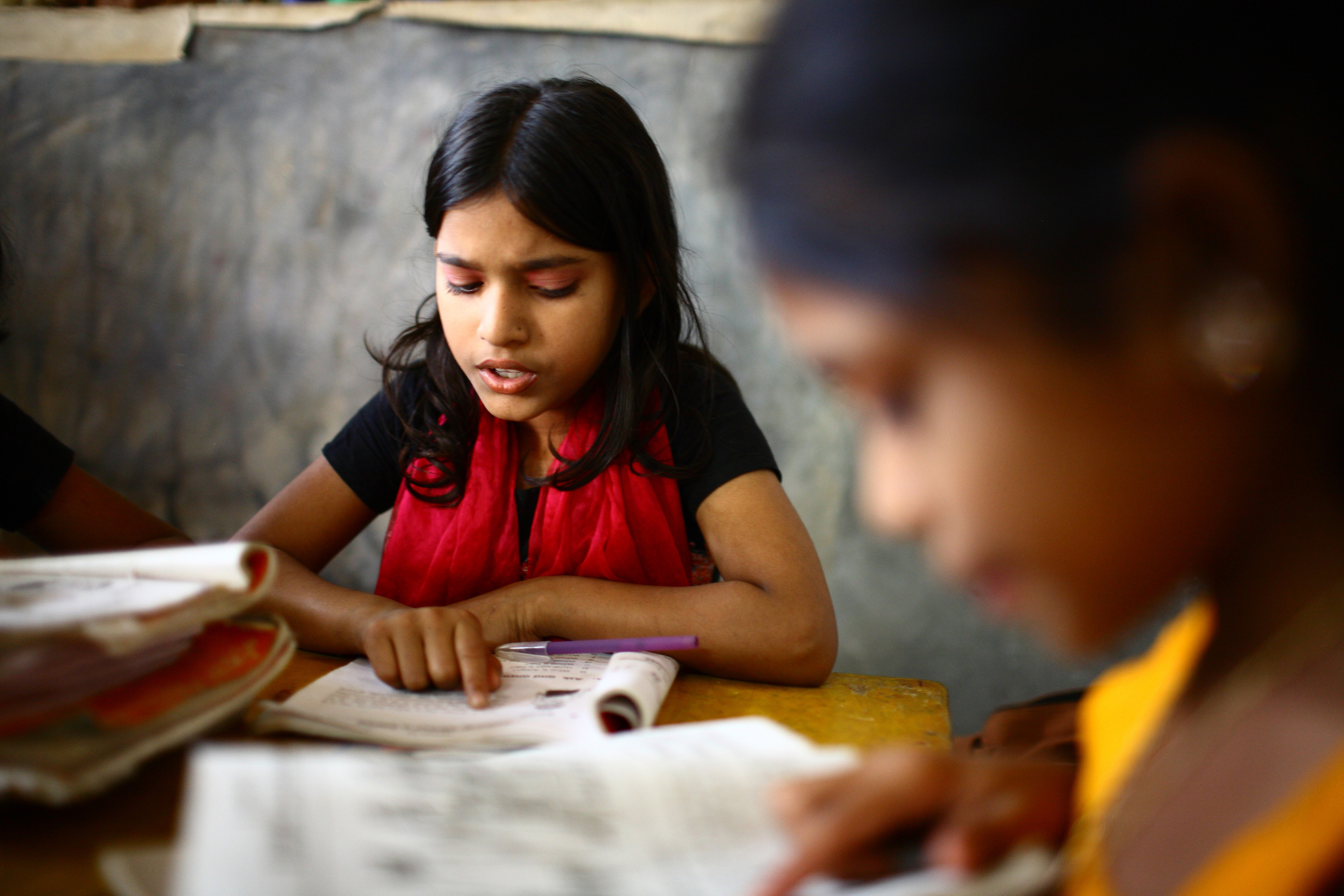
Girls studying at the Child Learning Center in Mirpur-Dhaka

Article 17 of the Bangladesh Constitution provides that all children receive free and compulsory education. By law, children between the ages of six and ten must attend school. However, the quality of education in Bangladesh is generally regarded as poor. According to UNICEF, access to education remains a challenge for working children, disabled children, indigenous children, those in remote areas, and those living in extreme poverty. Only half of all children living in poorer areas attend. Boys are more likely to drop out of school than girls or not enroll at all. One-third of staff at government schools teach without a certificate in education. Interactive and inclusive learning is difficult in the face of traditional teaching methods, which favor rote learning. Students regularly fail to meet required curriculum competencies, so repetition rates are high. It usually takes longer than five years for a child to complete grades one through five. Primary schools that do not have enough space to accommodate all local children resort to a ‘double shift,’ which effectively halves the time an individual spends in the classroom. Regular school closures further reduce class time. In many schools, dark and cramped classrooms continue to hamper learning.

== Child marriage ==
Child marriage rates in Bangladesh are amongst the highest in the world. Every 2 out of 3 marriages involve child marriages. According to statistics from 2005, 49% of women then between 25 and 29 were married by the age of 15 in Bangladesh. According to a 2008 study, for each additional year a girl in rural Bangladesh is not married, she will attend school an additional 0.22 years on average. The later the girls were married, the more likely they were to utilize preventative health care. Married girls in the region were found to have less influence on family planning, higher rates of maternal mortality, and lower status in their husband's family than girls who married later.

== Street children ==
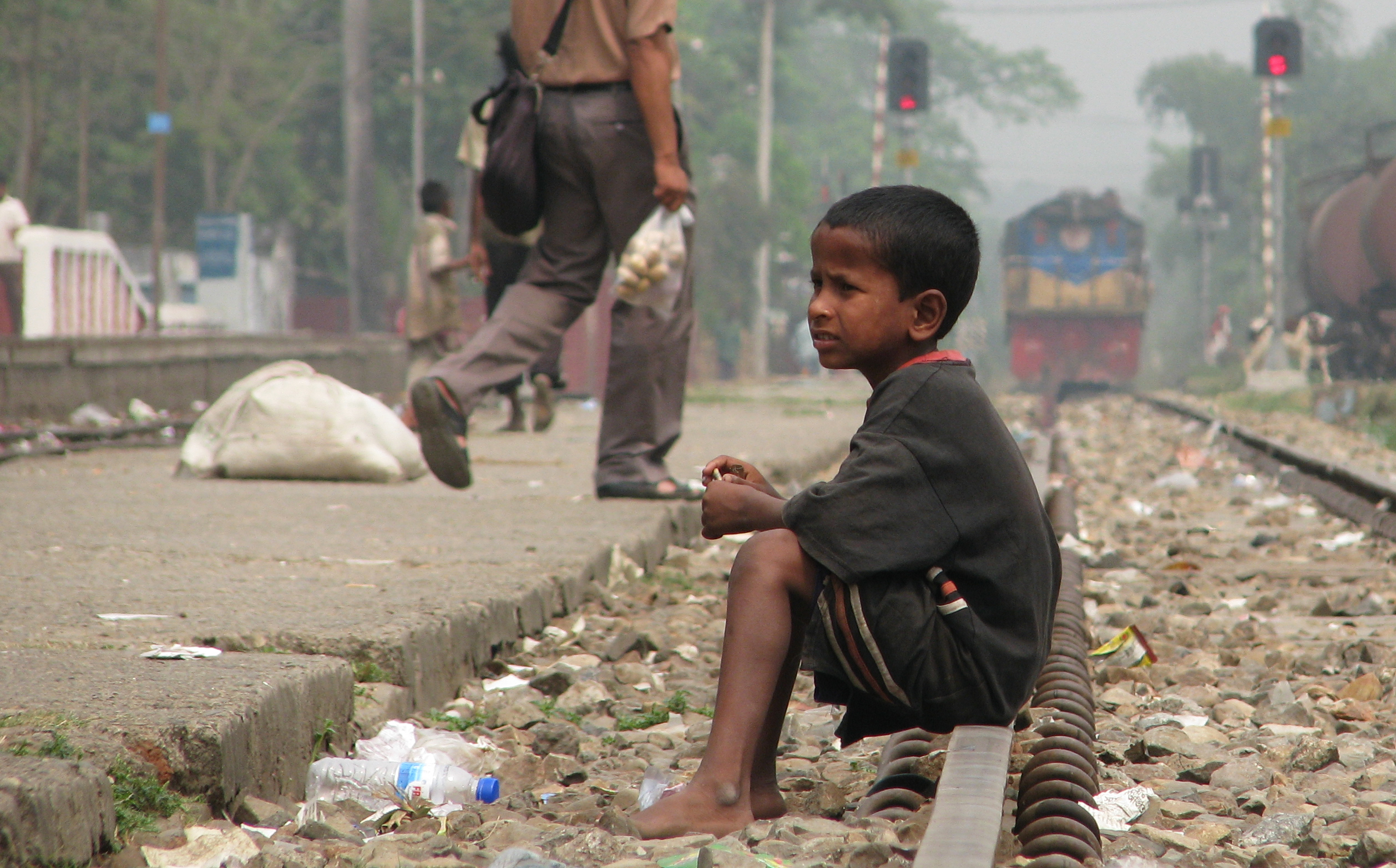
A street child in Srimangal Railway Station, Bangladesh

It is impossible to calculate exactly how many street children there are in Bangladesh, but the Institute of Development Studies has estimated it at 380,000 homeless children, 55% of them are in Dhaka city alone. They face a miserable life, trapped in a vicious cycle of poverty, deprived of the basic necessities, and with bleak prospects, some turn to crime. The chances of sexual exploitation are high among these children with no safe places to go, no family support and an inability to protect themselves. They are often harassed by law enforcing agencies. With almost no education and no access to healthcare, they are at high risk for infectious diseases, asthma and lead poisoning. Poor nutrition also contributes to their poor health, with increased rates of stunted growth and anemia.

== Child labour ==
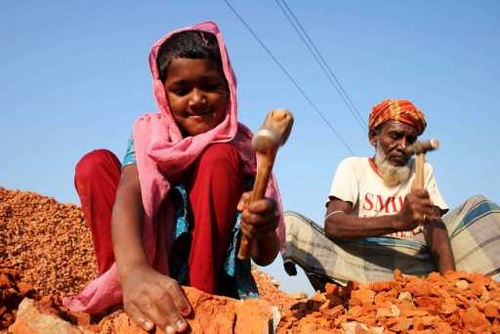
Child labour in Bangladesh.

Child labour in Bangladesh is common, with 4.7 million or 12.6% of children aged 5 to 14 in the work force. Out of the child labourers engaged in the work force, 83% are employed in rural areas and 17% are employed in urban areas. Employment ranges from jobs in the informal sector such as in agriculture and domestic service, to jobs in the formal sector, such as in the garment industry.

In 2006, Bangladesh passed a Labour Law setting the minimum legal age for employment as 14. Nevertheless, the enforcement of such labour laws is virtually impossible in Bangladesh because 93% of child labourers are employed in the informal sector such as small factories and workshops, on the street, in home-based businesses and domestic employment.

Despite the prevalence of child labour in Bangladesh, there has been an increase in legislation against child labour. Bangladesh has ratified, the ILO Worst Forms of Child Labour Convention (C182). In addition, the country also ratified the UN Convention on the Rights of the Child.

== See also ==
- Human rights in Bangladesh
