= Child labour in Bangladesh =

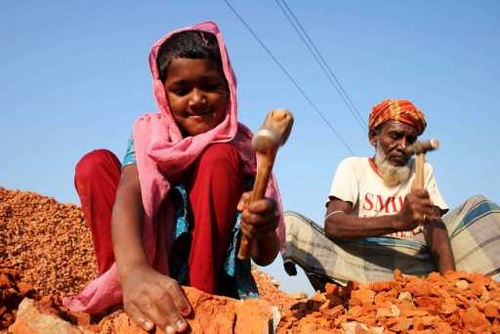
Child labour in Bangladesh.

Child labour in Bangladesh is significant, with 4.7 million children aged 5 to 14 in the work force in 2002-03. Out of the child labourers engaged in the work force, 83% are employed in rural areas and 17% are employed in urban areas. Child labour can be found in agriculture, poultry breeding, fish processing, the garment sector and the leather industry, as well as in shoe production. Children are involved in jute processing, the production of candles, soap and furniture. They work in the salt industry, the production of asbestos, bitumen, tiles and ship breaking.

In 2006, Bangladesh passed a Labor Law setting the minimum legal age for employment as 14. Nevertheless, the enforcement of such labour laws is virtually impossible in Bangladesh because 93% of child labourers are employed in the informal sector such as small factories and workshops, on the street, in home-based businesses and domestic employment.

Despite the prevalence of child labour in Bangladesh, there has been an increase in legislation against child labour. Bangladesh has ratified, the ILO Worst Forms of Child Labour Convention (C182). In addition, the country also ratified the UN Convention on the Rights of the Child.

== Definitions ==
The definition of child labour varies depending on region, culture, organization, and government. The Western perspective portrays childhood as a carefree stage of life in which a person does not possess the capacity to be an adult. Various organizations have their own definition of child labour and its parameters.

The International Labour Organization's (ILO) Minimum Age Convention 138 states that at age 12 a child is allowed to light work in non-hazardous situations and at age 15 a child is allowed to enter the work force. The ILO defines child labour as "work that exceeds a minimum number of hours, depending on the age of a child and on the type of work". The ILO also has three categories pertaining to children in work: economically active children, child labour, and hazardous work. Children can be categorised as economically active if they are involved in work outside of school or the home at least one hour once every seven days. Children can be categorised as performing child labour if they are under the age of 12 or performing hazardous work. Children are categorised as performing hazardous work if they are involved in activities that may harm their physical, mental, or developmental health or safety.

The United Nations Children's Emergency Fund (UNICEF) defines child labour as work exceeding a certain number of hours per week, depending on the age of the child and the kind of work. According to UNICEF, child labour affects their health and education, deprives them of a childhood, and opens the door to exploitation and abuse.

The International Programme on the Elimination of Child Labour (IPEC) defines employment and economically active children as "paid and unpaid work in the formal and nonformal sectors of rural and urban areas". This definition excludes children working in their own households.

The Bangladesh Bureau of Statistics considers children aged 5–14 who work for one or more hours (per week) in both paid and unpaid settings to be child workers. For children older than 10, any economic activity is considered a form of child labour. This includes work both inside and outside the household setting.

== Causes and impact ==
=== Poverty ===
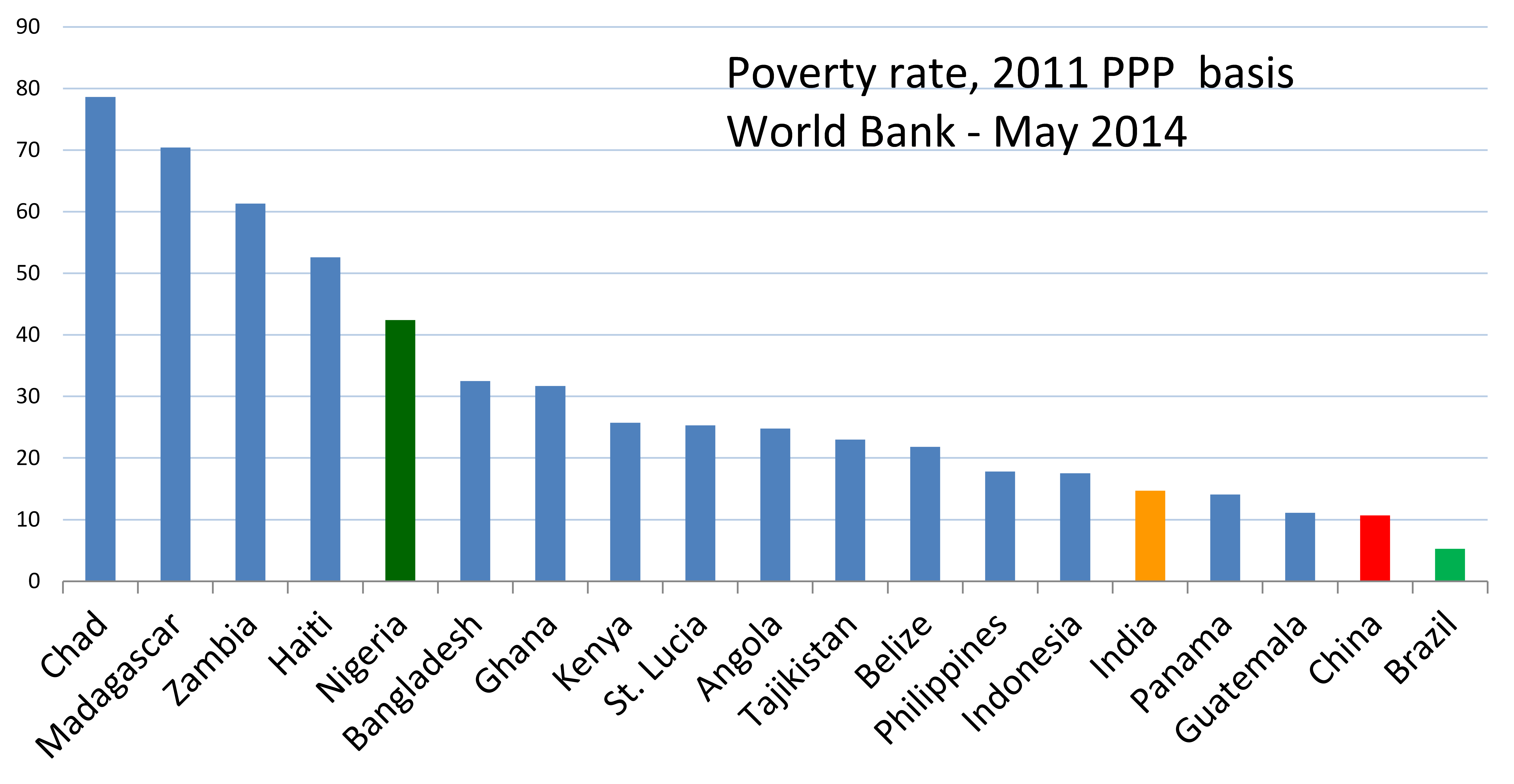
2014 Poverty rate chart Chad Haiti Nigeria Bangladesh Kenya Indonesia India China Brazil based on World Bank new 2011 PPP benchmarks

Poverty is widely recognised and acknowledged as the primary cause of child labour. The link between poverty and child labour is supported by efforts of international organizations, such as the ILO and the United Nations, to reduce child labour through poverty reduction policies. There is a strong negative correlation between the income level of a country and the incidence rate of child labour. An increase of $0–$500 per capita income to $500–$1000 per capita income can lead to a decrease in child labour incidence rate from 30%–60% to 10%–30%. Although the annual per capita income of Bangladesh has been increasing, around 9–13% of the total labour force in Bangladesh still consists of children aged 5–14. In a 2013 statistical report, UNICEF estimates that around 43.3% of the population in Bangladesh is currently living below the international poverty line.

Factors such as urbanization and population growth perpetuate poverty. In a 2013 statistical report, UNICEF estimated an annual population growth rate in Bangladesh to be 1.7% from 1990 to 2012. Populations move from rural to urban areas because there is an increase in available economic opportunities. A combination of poor living standards in urban settings and an influx of cheap labour from children perpetuate both poverty and the use of child labour. The prevalence of child labour can be attributed to the socioeconomic statuses of families living at or below the poverty line. Oftentimes, families rely on the extra income produced by their children in order to sustain their livelihood. Many children are forced to work to help support the family. In other cases, children are forced to work for a living for themselves because their families abandoned or could not take care of them. Studies have shown that children from poorer families are more likely to be in the work force due to their contribution to overall family income.

=== Demographics ===
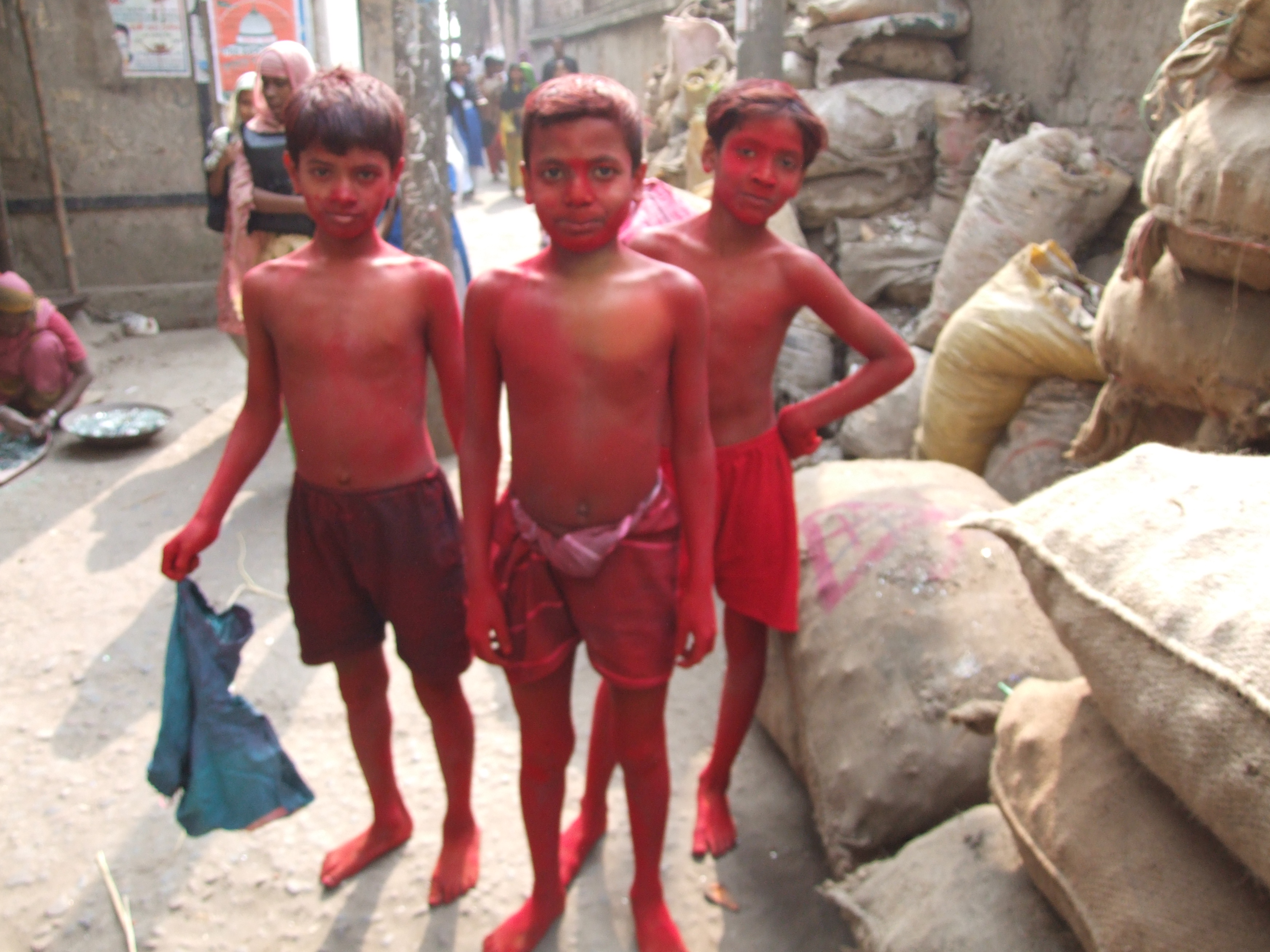
Boys covered with mercury-containing red vermilion chemical during child labour in a factory producing sindoor.

The demographics of the population in Bangladesh can also be a predictor of child labour incidence rates. Children in rural areas are more likely to work than children in urban areas. This may be due to the agricultural history of Bangladesh and the tradition of children working alongside adults in the fields. However, in both rural and urban settings, boys are more likely to work than girls, with the majority of child workers falling in the age range of 12–14.

Family dynamics also contributed to child labour incidence rates. Children in households with a large proportion of adults in the family are less likely to work. Children in households where all adults are working are more likely to work. Children in households where there is a larger portion of paid adult workers are even more likely to work. These findings by Salmon (2005) indicate that children are most likely to labour in households that have little potential to generate income and are already earning as much as they can.

=== Lack of education ===
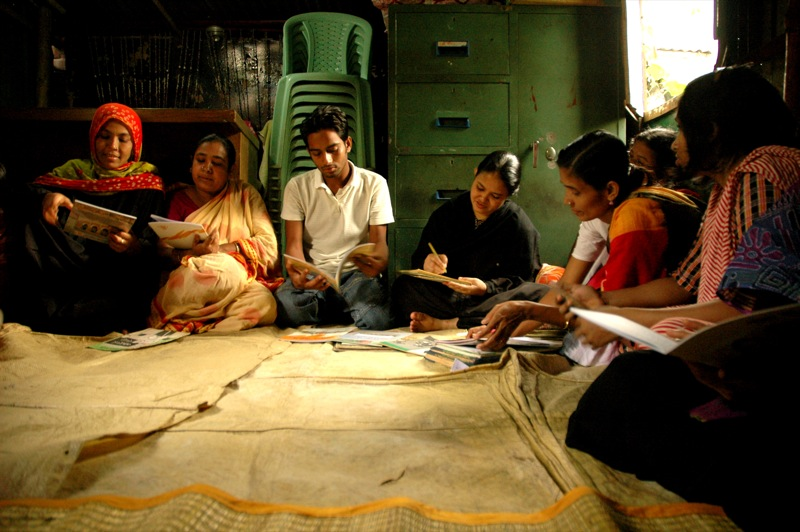
Community Box Library in Bangladesh

Lack of education remains one of the top impacts of child labour. Child labour is a deterrent to schooling. Many policies aimed at eradicating child labour have focused on increasing accessibility to education. Organizations such as the ILO, the United Nations, and UNICEF recognise the importance of education in helping to eradicate poverty and in preventing child labour growth rates. According to UNICEF, the new National Education Policy requires that children must complete school until grade eight and that school must be free. Many definitions of child labour state education as a right of childhood and consider barriers to education as a defining characteristic of child labour.

There is a strong relationship between child labour and school attendance. In a 2010 statistical report, UNICEF measured that around 50% of all working children in Bangladesh do not attend school. Another 6.8% of children between age 7 and 14 whom, while going to school, also work. Of those that do attend school, school performance is negatively affected when children are in the work force. Although school is free, many children are forced to drop out because they do not have the time or resources to attend. For many families, the income produced by their children is considered more valuable than an education that requires their child to stop working. A study conducted by Rahman (1997) found that around 58% of working children listed economic hardship as the reason they were not attending school. Of those that did choose to go to school, conditions of schools and the quality of education proved to be serious barriers to significant learning. A 2002 and 2003 survey conducted by the World Bank showed that on average teachers in Bangladesh miss one out of five days of work a week.

It has also been found that illiteracy rates are a predictor of child labour prevalence. In 2013, UNICEF estimates that total adult literacy is around 57.7%. Literacy rates also tend to be lower for females than males. In Bangladesh, less than 75% of girls finish their primary education.

== Prevalence ==
According to the recent 2014 TVPRA List of Goods Produced by Child Labor or Forced Labor published by the U.S. Department of Labor's Bureau of International Labor Affairs, Bangladesh figures among the 74 countries where significant incidence of child labour and forced labour is still observed. 15 products are produced in such working conditions in Bangladesh.

=== Informal sector ===
Most child labourers in Bangladesh are employed in the informal sector. These forms of labour are hard to regulate and monitor. The most common forms of work is agriculture, in rural areas, and domestic service, in urban areas. The majority of all child labourers in Bangladesh work in agriculture. Agricultural activities include poultry farming, drying fish, salt mining, shrimp farming and produce logistics. Children in agriculture use dangerous tools, carry heavy loads, and apply harmful pesticides. Many of these children are employed by their families as extra hands in the fields or sent out to work for their own food. They often work long hours with little to no pay and endure dangerous conditions that result in many health issues.

Children, mostly girls, work as domestic servants in private households in Bangladesh. Domestic child labourers work long hours and subject to harassment, emotional, physical, and sexual abuse. The majority of children working as domestic workers are employed seven days a week and live in the home they serve. Separation from family and working in private homes often results in the abuse and exploitation of these children. They endure harsh working conditions that cause psychological stress, physical strain, and health issues with little pay or compensation in the form of food, clothing, and shelter. Because domestic service occurs in the home, it is often not considered economic work. Therefore, there are minimal regulations for fair working conditions and wages.

Other informal industries with large child labour activity (age below 18) include ship breaking and recycling operations, production of soap, matches, bricks, cigarettes, footwear, furniture, glass, jute, leather, textiles, restaurants, garbage picking and trash hunting, vending, begging, portering, and van pulling. Many working children earn less than 10 US dollars per month.

=== Formal sector ===
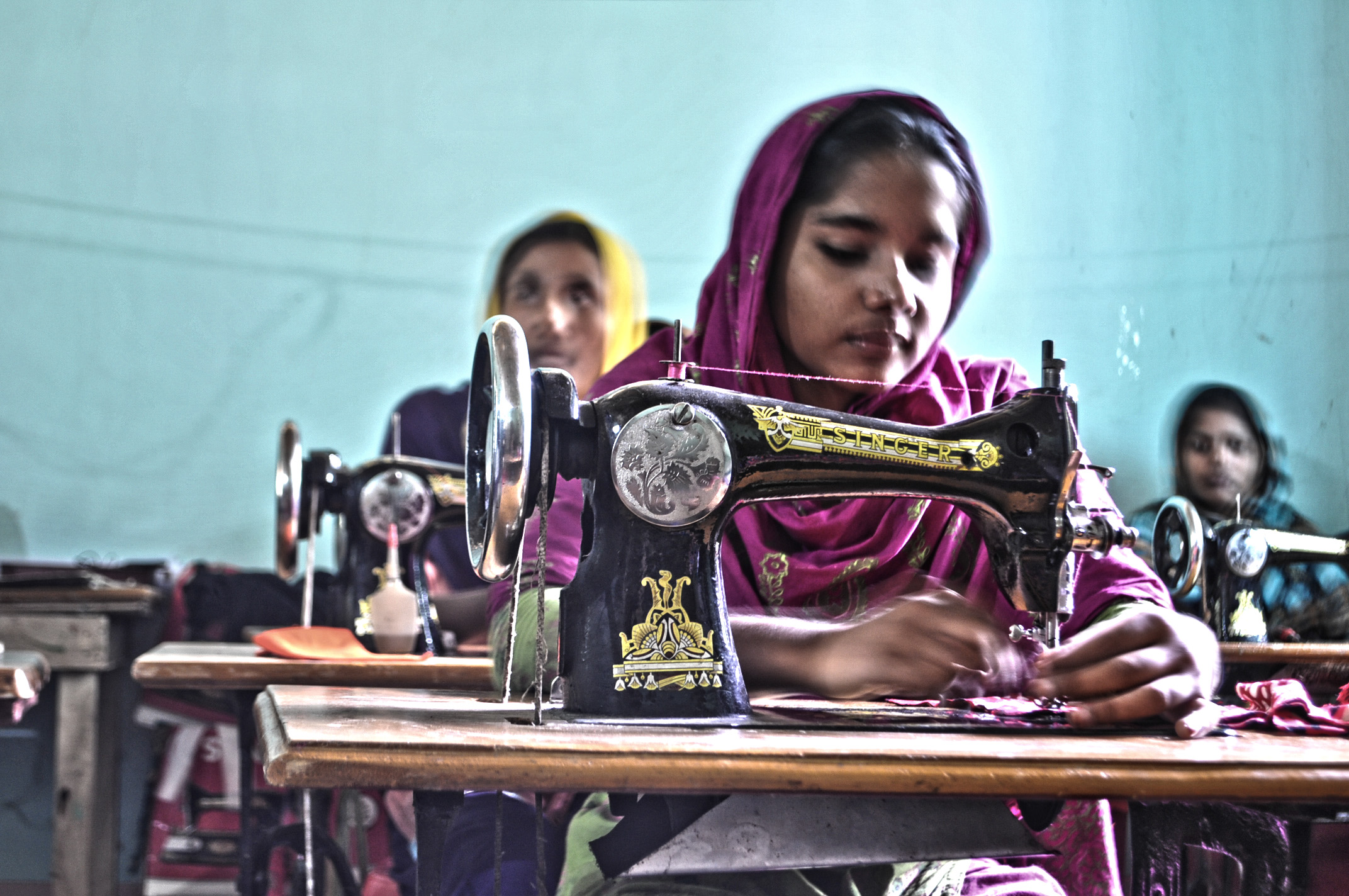
Girls and women were the most common employees of the garment industry.

The garment industry is the largest employer of child labour in the formal sector. The industry expanded rapidly from 1983 to 1999, becoming the country's largest source of export earnings. Bangladesh is in the top ten largest garment exporters in the world. The garment industry not only increased economic earning but also increased available jobs in urban settings, especially for women. As a result, the incidence of child labourers in urban areas increased. The majority of labourers in the garment industry hired are girls and women. Bangladesh garment factories have been accused of forcing girls as young as 13 to work up to 11 hours a day to produce garments for western retailers.

Children in this industry work around 10 hours a day for about 12 U.S. dollars a month. Children are also exposed to various health and safety hazards. Garment shops are at great risk of fires due to blocked fire exits, poor crowd control, and lack of fire safety precautions. Working in garment shops also exposes children to dangerous chemicals and heavy machinery. These exposures to safety hazards can lead to various health issues ranging from cuts and bruises to musculoskeletal disorders.

== Child labour laws influencing practices in Bangladesh ==
=== Legislation in Bangladesh ===
The Employment of Children Act 1938

This act allowed for children aged 15 or up to work in the railway industry and in transporting goods in port jobs. It also allowed for children aged 15–17 to work night shifts that may last until the morning under certain stipulations such as resting for 13 consecutive hours, working under someone that is 18 years or older, or serving an apprenticeship. It prohibited children under 12 from working in hazardous industries but did not mention protection for children between the ages 12–18.

The Factories Act 1965

This act prohibited children under 14 to work in or be present in factories. Factories was defined as any place with more than 10 people employed. It also listed various protections for children from hazardous machines and operations. It prohibited any work duration of longer than 5 hours between 7pm to 7am. It also states the weight lifting limits for types of workers (male, female, child).

Shops and Establishment Act 1965

This act defined a shop or establishment as a place that employs 5 or more people. This act prohibited children under the age of 12 from working in any establishment. It allowed children aged 12–18 to work in establishments but limited the number of work hours to a maximum of 7 hours a day.

The Constitution of the People's Republic of Bangladesh

The Constitution of Bangladesh while guaranteeing the fundamental rights for the people prohibits all forms of forced labor under Article 34. Article 34 lays down that 'all forms of forced labor are prohibited and any contravention of this provision shall be an offense punishable in accordance with law'.

The Children Act 2013

The Children Act 2013 repealed the previous Children Act 1974 which was inconsistent with international standards particularly with the UN Convention on the Rights of the Child 1989. Section 4 of this Act provides that notwithstanding anything contained in any other law for the time being in force every person shall be deemed to be a child who is below the age of 18 years. Though there is no specific provision prohibiting child labor it proscribes and punishes some serious offenses against children including exploitation of children (section 80).

=== Applicable laws from other legal jurisdictions ===
The Child Labor Deterrence Act 1993 (Harkin's Bill)

Originating from U.S. Senator Tom Harkin, this bill banned imports of items that were associated with child labour at various stages of production, whether it was direct involvement in the product or indirect involvement such as packaging. This law affected the labour situation in Bangladesh because garment industries, fearing a loss of business, fired many child labourers.

Human Trafficking Deterrence and Suppression Act 2012

According to the Office of Child Labor, Forced Labor, and Human Trafficking (OCFT) United States Department of Labor:

In 2011, Bangladesh made a moderate advancement in efforts to eliminate the worst forms of child labor. Bangladesh passed the Human Trafficking Deterrence and Suppression Act 2012 which makes human trafficking (including labor trafficking) a capital offense, developed and fully funded a Child Labor Monitoring Information System to manage child labor related data and began implementation of a $9 million child labor project. However, legal protections regarding child labor are limited and the capacity to enforce child labor laws remains weak. Bangladesh maintains a low compulsory education age. Children in Bangladesh are engaged in the worst forms of child labor, primarily in dangerous activities in agriculture and domestic service.

The legislation tried to enroll more children and adults into school and away from work. This was not the outcome. Some children enrolled in school, but many sought other work. Due to the law, many kids took more dangerous jobs in the informal economy, including; prostitution, street hawkers, stone welding, and as maids. Schooling is compulsory only to age 10. The minimum age for most child labor is 14, 18 for hazardous work.

== Initiatives against child labour ==
Flag of ILO

The Memorandum of Understanding (MOU) 1995

Signed by the Bangladesh Garment Manufacturers and Exporters Association (BGMEA), ILO, and UNICEF this initiative allowed children displaced and fired from the garment industry to receive education, vocational training, and skills training. It also provided families with income to make up for their child's lack of work. This program is also called "The Placement of Children Workers in School Programs and the Elimination of Child Labor." The MOU has made an impact in reducing child labour in the garment industry in Bangladesh. Because of this program, more than 8,200 children received non-formal education after losing their jobs. Additionally, 680 children received vocational training.

The Bangladesh Rehabilitation Assistance Committee (BRAC)

The Bangladesh Rehabilitation Assistance Committee is a non-profit organization founded in the mid-1970s in Bangladesh. BRAC, along with Grameen Bank, are the two largest lenders of microcredit in Bangladesh. Together they cover 59% of borrowers in the country. Microcredit has been shown to alleviate poverty but in small amounts. The effects of microcredit are not large enough to change the lives of an entire population. However, it has been shown to allow families in poverty to find a way out. BRAC has also been responsible for running schools for non-formal education that were put in place to teach children fired from jobs. These non-formal schools also gave children another option besides schooling. Along with the schooling program, families also received health care services and monthly cash stipends to make up for the wages their children were not bringing in by participating in the schooling program.

Other strategies

In addition to the work of the government, BRAC, and ILO, there have been a number of contributions from international organizations and donors to help start strategies against child labour. These strategies include: taking children out of hazardous work environments and placing them in schooling or training programs, giving families stipends to compensate for loss in wages from a decrease in child labour, and raising awareness of the harmful effects of child labour.

== See also ==
- Children's rights movement
- Guaranteed minimum income
- International Programme on the Elimination of Child Labour, IPEC
- IREWOC - Institute for Research on Working Children
- Legal working age
- Multinational corporation
- Street children
- Wage Slavery
- Youth activism
- Bangladesh textile industry
- Steel industry in Bangladesh
- Fishing in Bangladesh
- Jute trade

International conventions and other instruments:

- Worst Forms of Child Labour Convention, 1999
