= International Research on Working Children =

The Amsterdam-based foundation for International Research on Working Children (IREWOC) was established in 1992 in order to generate more research on child labour. It has developed into a professional organization which is closely in touch both with the academic world and with development practitioners. IREWOC looks at the issue of child labor from the perspective of child rights and with a focus on the socio-cultural and economic environment.

It seeks to understand the reasons, based on economic necessity, why many children work, and takes a strong position in favour of abolition while making a distinction between (light forms of) child work and child labor.

The IREWOC research staff has conducted worldwide anthropological research on various aspects related to child labor. Major projects that have been concluded are on Working Children and Agency, Child Labour Unions, Child Labour Migration and Deprived Children and Education. The focus presently is on the worst forms of child labour. Intensive research is going on in a dozen of countries across the developing world. Research is conducted with the policy implications in view (https://web.archive.org/web/20070929021731/http://www.childlabour.net/docs/GIEPublicatie.pdf)

The IREWOC director, Dr. G.K. Lieten, is a professor of Child Labour Studies at the University of Amsterdam and at the International Institute of Social History. His inaugural address deals with the historical, sociological and ideological aspects of child labour.
