= Explanation of benefits =

Health insurance statement

An explanation of benefits (commonly referred to as an EOB form) is a statement sent by a health insurance company to covered individuals explaining what medical treatments and/or services were paid for on their behalf.

The EOB is commonly attached to a check or statement of electronic payment.

An EOB typically describes:

- the payee, the payer and the patient
- the service performed—the date of the service, the description and/or insurer's code for the service, the name of the person or place that provided the service, and the name of the patient
- the doctor's fee, and what the insurer allows—the amount initially claimed by the doctor or hospital, minus any reductions applied by the insurer
- the amount the patient is responsible for
- adjustment reasons, adjustment codes

EOB documents are protected health information.

Electronic EOB documents are called edi 835 5010 files.

There will normally also be at least a brief explanation of any claims that were denied, along with a point to start an appeal.

A member with secondary insurance gives such information to the provider for the next bill to go out to that insurance company. Generally, secondary insurance pays only the amount the EOB says the member is responsible for. Secondary EOBs show if the patient still has any responsibility to the provider. After the member's insurances have processed the claim, the provider bills the member for the remaining balance, if any.
