= National Longitudinal Survey of Children and Youth =

The National Longitudinal Survey of Children and Youth (NLSCY) is a project of Statistics Canada which engages in the long-term study of children.

The NLSCY is implemented by Statistics Canada and Human Resources and Social Development Canada, and charged with identifying and charting longer-term trends in Canadian youth. The survey tracks the progress and development of children from birth through early adulthood, and is meant to identify factors influencing each child's development. Specific areas of study include emotional, social and behavioural development and their implications for the child in adulthood. This is done by observing physical development and overall health, learning ability, behavioural tendencies, family and friend structure, the type of school and community in which the child is raised.

The study is conducted every two years, and was first conducted in 1994. The information gathered is used for policy decisions ranging from university financial aid and enrolment to distribution of educational, medical or family-related funds and education reform. The types of classes offered in schools, for example, may reflect the types of classes shown to best bolster a child's development.

The program targets children raised in each of Canada's 10 provinces, but excludes children living on Indian reserves, Crown lands, residents of institutions, children of full-time members of the Canadian Forces and those in certain remote regions.

The study has been inactive since 2009.

== Methodology ==
The program selects children under age 11 to begin the process, and studying five subject areas: child development and behaviour, childhood, education, training and health. Each biennial report collects data for approximately one year. Evaluations are voluntary, and data is measured by testing. The first three tests are surveys about the child; the "child" component has the person most knowledgeable about the child as a respondent, the "adult" component uses the spouse of the person most knowledgeable about the child as a respondent and the "youth" component is given to the child. The fourth measurement is a cognitive test which incorporates mathematics and other educational subject matter. Finally, a series of tests given to the respondent child several times is used. Which test is given depends on the age of the child: a self-completed questionnaire for ages 12–16, a problem-solving exercise (16–17), a literacy assessment (18–19) and a numeracy assessment (20–21).

== Critique ==
Critics assert that a volunteer-based means of evaluation is not representative; certain respondents will be predisposed to participate or abstain. Moreover, the exclusion of many children ensures that the study will not be wholly representative and may result in neglecting certain groups of children. Military families' children are not included in the survey. Neither are children in remote locations; tracking, administering and accessing these children may be too difficult and costly. This alienates these groups from reform, since government policymakers are unaware of the trends and needs of these children.
