= Adriana Umaña-Taylor =

American professor of education

Academic background
- Education: University of Missouri

Academic work
- Discipline: Psychology
- Institutions: Harvard Graduate School of Education; Arizona State University

Adriana Janette Umaña-Taylor is an American professor of education in the Harvard Graduate School of Education. Prior to this, she was a faculty member in the T. Denny Sanford School of Social and Family Dynamics at Arizona State University, where she worked from 2004 until 2017, starting as an assistant professor and advancing through the ranks of associate professor and full professor, eventually being named a Foundation Professor. Umaña-Taylor's first position after graduate school was at the University of Illinois at Urbana–Champaign in the Human and Community Development Department.

== Education and research ==
She earned her bachelor's and master's degrees in Psychology and Child Development and Family Relationships, respectively, from the University of Texas and her Ph.D. in Human Development and Family Studies at the University of Missouri in Columbia in 2001. Umaña-Taylor is most known for her research on Latino adolescent adjustment and ethnic-racial identity development.

== Awards ==
- 2017 - Umaña-Taylor was conferred a fellow of the National Council on Family Relations.
- 2018 - Umaña-Taylor was recognized "renowned psychologist" and elected to the governing Council of Representatives of the American Psychological Association, in Division 45, Society for the Psychological Study of Culture, Ethnicity and Race.
