= Adolescent sexuality in the United Kingdom =

Adolescent sexuality in the UK

Adolescent sexuality has been a topic observed and studied within the United Kingdom throughout the 20th century and in the 21st century. Associated organisations have been established to study and monitor trends and statistics as well as provide support and guidance to adolescents.

== Sexual activity and contraception use ==
The Family Planning Association, was established in the 1930's. In 1952, the charity began to offer contraceptive advice to single women who were just about to wed.

A study in Manchester revealed that, between the years 1937 and 1954, almost a quarter of underage girls came to the attention of one female police officer, regarding pregnancy. It was also noted that the girls often came from backgrounds of broken homes or bad parental influence. It was found that they also tended to have a lower than average IQ.

The combined oral contraceptive pill became available in 1961, but initially only to married women. The proportion of teenage girls who were married rose from 5% in 1951 to 8% in 1961. In the same year, a study on Scottish women found that almost a quarter of single women were sexually experienced before their 20th birthday. The proportion of sexually experienced single women had risen by 6% during the late 1940s, and it rose again by 15% during the late 1950s. The findings of the study concluded that there was an increase in sexual intercourse among young single women after the advent of the contraceptive pill in 1961.

In 1964, the United Kingdom had its first comprehensive survey on sexual behaviour amongst unmarried teenagers. The survey revealed that by the age of 18, a third of boys and approximately one in six girls were sexually experienced. The survey also highlighted that for girls under the age of 16, one in twenty were sexually active. Approximately one in three teenage girls, who engaged in premarital sexual intercourse, fell pregnant. In the survey, amongst sexually experienced individuals, one-fifth of girls and two-fifths of boys always used birth control. Condoms served as the most common form of birth control (selected by around 80% of those using birth control).

Percent of adolescents who have had sex before the age of 16
Year	Boys	Girls
1964	14%	5%
1974	31%	12%
1991	28%	19%
2001	30%	26%
2008	34%	38%
2012	30.9%	29.2%

In 1964, Helen Brook set up the Brook Advisory Centres, offering contraceptive advice to single people under the age of 25. In 1967, a change in the law allowed local health authorities to offer contraceptive services to unmarried individuals. By 1968, only one in six authorities were providing such a service. Mr. K. Robinson, answered a question in the House of Commons regarding the new Family Planning Act in October 1967, in which he stated that it would be unwise to exclude girls under 16 from receiving advice at family planning clinics (FPC); though, these girls would only be seen at FPCs in exceptional circumstances even with parental consent.

By 1969, Brook Advisory Centres were offering contraceptive advice to over ten thousand unmarried people under 25—the majority aged between 19 and 21, with around one in six being under 19. In 1970, The Family Planning Association were mandated to offer contraception to unmarried people. In 1971, a survey on Scottish single female students revealed that one third of these students had had sexual intercourse by the age of 18. Over half had not using any form of contraception. The survey also showed that one in seven girls, who had recently been sexually active, had a partner who was a casual boyfriend.

In 1971, a doctor was reported for informing the parents of a 16-year-old girl that she had come to him seeking contraception. This prompted the British Medical Association to advise doctors to maintain young patients' confidentiality when seeking contraception. Three-quarters of teenagers visiting Brook Advisory Centres during the early 1970s were doing so without their parents' knowledge.

Controversy was also sparked when a 12-year-old girl, who had recently undergone an abortion, was put on the contraceptive pill with her parents' consent by gynecologist Dr Mary Wilson at Calthorpe nursing home in Birmingham. She said "so many girls come back pregnant again after three or four months, that is why I gave her a supply of the pill and contraceptive advice". Labour MP Leo Abse was concerned that the prescribing of the pill to a 12-year-old child was an offence under the sexual offences act.

In 1975, under the new National Health Service reorganisation act, contraception was made available free of charge to everyone, including single people and those aged under 16. Clarification was given to doctors that they could provide contraception to patients under 16 without parental consent in certain circumstances. The average age of first sexual intercourse for girls had now dropped from 21 in the mid-1950s to 18. Over a quarter of boys under 16 and almost one in eight girls under 16 were sexually experienced.

In 1976, a report by the British Pregnancy Advisory Service found that 69 percent of girls under the age of 16, who had come to them for an abortion during the year, had used no contraception. Most of them were experienced at sex. By 1978, Brook Advisory Centres were government funded and 3% of Brook's clients were under the age of 16.

In 1980, the 1974 DHSS circular about parental consent and the issuing of contraception/abortion advice to girls under 16 was reviewed. The conclusion was that a doctor or a professional worker should always seek to persuade the child to involve her parents or guardian at the earliest stage of consultation; but it was accepted that occasionally contraception would be given without parental consent.

The number of girls under 16 visiting family planning clinics in England reached over seventeen thousand in 1983, but cuts in health service expenditure forced the closure of many family planning clinics and a restriction in the services available to young people that year.

In 1984, a high court ruling in favour of Victoria Gillick, it was deemed illegal for health professionals to advise or give girls under 16 contraceptives without parental consent except in exceptional circumstances; the number of girls under 16 visiting family planning clinics each year dropped to twelve thousand in response. When the House of Lords overturned the high court ruling in 1985 and confidential contraceptive advice to young people was restored, the number rose again to sixteen thousand per year.

In the first sex survey of its kind, the National Survey of Sexual Attitudes and Lifestyles (NATSAL) in 1991 revealed that one in six girls under 16 and a quarter of boys under 16 were sexually experienced. A fifth of sexually active 16- and 17-year-olds and over half of 18- and 19-year-olds were using at least one method of contraception. The second NATSAL in 2001 showed that the average age of first intercourse had dropped from 17 in the 1980s to 16. It also revealed that a quarter of girls and nearly a third of boys were sexually experienced before the age of 16.

A survey conducted in 2005 found that the number of girls under 16 visiting family planning clinics had risen throughout the 1990s to peak at over ninety-one thousand in 2003, before falling to eighty-three thousand. The most popular choice was the condom with over half choosing this method of contraceptive.

== Sexually transmitted infections ==
The proportion of patients visiting sexual health clinics for treatment of venereal disease, particularly the sexually transmitted infection gonorrhoea, has shown a general increase over the years.

For women, the figures from a study in Manchester showed teenagers accounted for 10% of patients in 1939, up to 23% in 1954. Later studies show figures of 23% in 1957, 27% in 1963, and 33% in 1981. The rate of new cases of gonorrhoea diagnosed at sexual health clinics amongst girls under 16 in England increased more than threefold from 2.76 per hundred thousand of the population in 1966 to 9.38 in 1976.

In men, the proportion of patients at sexual health clinics who were under the age of 20 rose from 3.8% in 1939 to 4.8% in 1954. Amongst boys under 16 the rate of gonorrhoea diagnoses rose from 0.94 per hundred thousand of the population in 1966 to 2.19 in 1976.

In 1971 the number of teenagers visiting sexual health clinics with gonorrhoea reached over ten thousand, 60% were girls and one in twenty were under 16. The number of persons under 16 being diagnosed with gonorrhoea in England fell from 637 in 1976 to 361 in 1981, but the levels rose again and in 1996 there were over ten thousand new cases of gonorrhoea to teenagers reported in sexual health clinics, up over 30% from 1995. In a study in 2005 this number had fallen to 3,700.

Levels of chlamydia in teenagers rose throughout the 1980s and 1990s; in 1996 the levels increased by over 16% from the previous year, and by 2005 it was the most common sexually transmitted infection amongst teenagers with over thirty thousand new cases reported, almost 28% of all new cases. In 2006 a screening programme of young people by the Department of Health revealed that 12% of girls aged 16–19 and 13% of men aged 20–24 were infected with chlamydia.

== Non-Heterosexual Sexual Behavior ==
A UK study used the previous SHARE and RIPPLE studies to observe adolescent sexual behavior across two cohorts in 52 schools from the years 1996 to 2001.

The SHARE studies, also known as the "Survey of Health, Ageing and Retirement in Europe", conducts surveys to study the longitudinal effects of policies across the European population. The RIPPLE studies, also known as the "Randomised Intervention trial of PuPil-Led sex Education", was a two phase sexual risk education program that observed effective differences in sexual-risk outcomes between student-led or teacher-led sex education programs across the UK.

In the longitudinal and comparative study, participants, under the age of 16, are analyzed in subcategories based on their gender and partner-based sexual experiences. The follow-up questionnaire at the age of 16 distinguished between heterosexual and non-heterosexual experiences regarding intercourse, genital contact, partner pressure, pregnancy, and partner pregnancy risk.

Findings from that questionnaire indicated that about 2.3% of females and 2.3% of males had experienced some form of genital contact with a same-sex partner compared to the 69.6% of females and 67.7% of males who only had opposite-sex genital contact experiences. Among those who reported heterosexual first sex encounters, 9% males and 19% of females felt partner pressure; additionally, 23% of males and 42% of females regretted it. For individuals with any experience of non-heterosexual sexual contact, 26% of males and 25% of females felt partner pressure; additionally, 44% males and 50% of females regretted their first sex encounter. Sexual risk taking behavior, such as not using a condom (in first sex encounters) and having multiple opposite-sex partners, was significantly higher for males engaged in bisexual behavior.

In a different study conducted from 2004 to 2006, the Avon Longitudinal Study of Parents and Children assessed the development of sexual behavior and orientation of participants at the age of 13.5 and then again at the age of 15.5 years. Classifications were based on presence of same-sex intimacy and high, moderate, low, or no intensity of sexual behaviors.

Results from the Avon Longitudinal Study of Parents and Children, show that at age 13.5, there were no reports of same-sex intimacy. At age 15.5, there was a report of a new subgroup with some same-sex intimacy for 2.41% of males and 8.35% of females from the whole cohort. From the age of 13.5 to 15.5 years old, 17.71% of children from one subgroup—reporting high-intensity sexual behaviors but no-same sex intimacy, had transitioned to the new subgroup with some same-sex intimacy. From the age of 13.5 to 15.5 years old, approximately 50% of children from one subgroup—reporting moderate-intensity sexual behaviors but no-same sex intimacy, had also transitioned to the new subgroup with some same-sex intimacy.

== See also ==
- Adolescent sexuality
- Age-of-consent reform in the United Kingdom
- Ages of consent in Europe
- Teenage pregnancy in the United Kingdom
