= Scouting sex abuse cases =

Sexual abuses in Scouting programs

Scouting sex abuse cases are situations where youth involved in Scouting programs have been sexually abused by someone who is also involved in the Scouting program (an adult Scout leader, or more rarely, a fellow Scout). In some instances, formal charges have been laid, resulting in specific legal cases.

== Scouting sex abuse by country ==
=== Australia ===
In 2014, Darryl Rubiolo, a former Scout Association of Australia leader, area commissioner and member of the New South Wales state branch council was convicted of serial child sex offences against three boys aged 9, 13 and 14, between 1975 and 1987 while he was an official of the Scout Association of Australia. Rubiolo was sentenced to 2 1/2 years in prison with a non-parole period of one year.

In September 2009, a 61-year-old man and former Scout leader in South Australia, was convicted of sexually assaulting an 11-year-old boy. The abuse took place over four years in the 1980s. The man was not named to save his own teenage son from embarrassment.

In 2004, a 48-year-old, former Scout Association of Australia leader in South Australia, Gregory John Kench, was charged with having sex with a 13-year-old boy two times. Kench was sentenced to 10 years in jail. This was his second conviction in five years for sexual abuse against Scouts. The offenses occurred in 1991, 1992 and 1993.

In 2017, Anthony Munro, a former Scout leader, was sentenced to 10 years and nine months' jail for abusing two boys between 1965 and 1983. Munro sexually assaulted his first victim on three occasions from 1965, including on a trip to Rapid Bay, South Australia. While working as a Scout leader in 1978, Munro he started abusing his second victim, then aged 11. Offences against that victim spanned a period of five years. He was sentenced on several charges, including indecent assault, unlawful sexual intercourse and gross indecency.

Former Scout leader in South Australia, Noel Allen Mortess was jailed in 1998 for 4 1/2 years for the sexual abuse of a teenage boy — but in 2008 he went to police and admitted to abusing six other boys.

=== Canada ===
==== Past issues ====
Over the organization's history of more than 100 years there have been numerous policies and practices to address child and youth safety.

It was reported in a CBC documentary that Scouts Canada had signed out-of-court confidentiality agreements with more than a dozen child sex-abuse victims. These agreements reportedly forbade the youths from revealing the amounts paid or even the fact that there was a settlement and, in one case, from making any public statement regarding the abuse. CBC researchers found that 24 lawsuits had been filed against Scouts Canada since 1995, all concerning incidents between 1960 and the 1990s, with 13 victims signing confidentiality agreements.

Two months following the documentary, Scouts Canada's Chief Commissioner apologized on YouTube to "all former Scouts who suffered harm at the hands of those who abused the trust and responsibility they had gained as volunteer Leaders in our movement".

Scouts Canada stated in the video that to their knowledge, they had always reported abuse to police, and had asked independent public accounting firm KPMG to audit 350 of their files to ensure "complete confidence". They also stated that they asked Peter Dudding, CEO of the Child Welfare League of Canada, to review their youth protection policies and make recommendations.

Scouts Canada, upon review of the files by KPMG, has stated that it has not always reported to police its leaders who sexually molested children in Scouting. In some cases, abusers had been "removed discreetly".

==== Modernized screening ====
Scouts Canada has modernized its screening practices for adult members. Applicants must complete a Police Record Check with Vulnerable Sector Check. Local volunteers interview applicants and check the multiple references they must provide. In addition, prospective volunteers must complete leadership training, child and youth safety training and accessibility training before they are considered fully active members. Scouts Canada volunteers are prohibited from being with a youth member alone; two fully screened volunteers are required to be present at all times. In the event that volunteers are suspected of misconduct, policy requires that they are immediately suspended and the relevant authorities are notified with all information shared.

Scouts Canada provides with some of its handbooks, and online, a booklet called How to Protect Your Children from Child Abuse: A Parent's Guide. In addition, it is a badge requirement in the Scout program for parents and youth to review a portion of How to Protect Your Children from Child Abuse: A Parent's Guide

==== Individual cases ====
Richard Turley is a Canadian who had abused children in California. In 1979, the Boy Scouts of America told Turley to return to Canada, not warning Scouts Canada of Turley's criminal behavior. In 1996, Turley was convicted of an assault on four boys, three of whom were Scouts, in Victoria, British Columbia. He was sentenced to seven years in prison. A group committee chair had complained about Turley's behaviour and he was told to leave his troop, but he then joined a different troop.

In 1997, John Adams, a former Scouts Canada leader, was sentenced to 16 months in jail for sexually assaulting a young Ottawa, Ontario Scout. The abuse occurred from 1979 to 1985, from the time the youth was 9 to 15 years old, and took place in the offender's home and Scouts Canada properties.

In 2001, Brian Durham, a former Kitchener, Ontario Scout leader, pleaded guilty to 27 counts of assault, sexual touching, and counseling to commit sexual acts. Many more charges were dropped in exchange for his guilty plea. The offenses were committed against 20 children from January 1991 to March 2000. Separately, the court was handling six additional charges against Durham based on offenses he committed in 1973 and 1974 when he was a minor. The charges are under the now-defunct Juvenile Delinquents Act.

=== United Kingdom ===
A number of cases have taken place in the United Kingdom. Initially a range of internal measures were used to assess applicants, until 2002, when the Criminal Records Bureau was formed following public concern about the safety of children, young people and vulnerable adults. This was replaced by the Disclosure and Barring Service in 2012. Despite these additional safeguards, some individuals have still managed to gain access to young people within the Movement. Some notable cases are listed below.

In 2006, Alan Grant, a 42-year-old man who had held Scouting leadership positions in Scotland for more than 20 years, admitted to abusing two 15-year-old boys in his home in 2006. To entice the boys to visit his home, Grant had set up a “fake camp,” complete with fake parent authorization forms, and obtained the parents’ permission for the boys to attend. Instead, the boys were taken to his home and given alcohol before the abuse took place. He was sentenced to nine months in jail. In response, the Scottish Scouting Association representative said the organization's background checks were as “robust’ as they could be.”

In 2008, Wilson Reid, a 49-year-old Scout leader in Portadown, Northern Ireland, was arrested and charged with count of rape, three counts of indecent assault against a male child and one count of supplying intoxicating substances to a person under 18. These incidents took place in 1997 and 1998.

A 37-year-old man from Norwich, England who had been a former Scout leader pleaded guilty in 2009 to five charges of having sex with a child. The sexual activity started about 2004, when the child was 13 years old, and continued for three years. The offender, Julien Pike, was sentenced to four years in jail. In reaction to the case, an official of The Scout Association said, "The association is aware that Julien Pike has pleaded guilty to the charges laid before him. Pike was suspended from any form of contact with the movement as soon as we were aware of the arrest. The Scout Association carries out stringent vetting of all adults who work with young people."

In April 2011, David Burland, 53, of the 1st Burnham-on-Sea Scout Group in Somerset, was bailed to appear before Taunton Deane Magistrates' Court after being charged with 12 indecent assaults, 13 counts of sexual assault, four counts of gross indecency and six of inciting a boy to engage in sexual activity. These charges relate to the alleged abuse of boys under the age of 16. Burland also faces a charge of sexual assault and indecent exposure relating to a girl under 16. Burland had been involved in the Scout movement since the 1990s.

In 2014, the BBC learned that more than 50 people had instructed UK solicitors Bolt Burdon Kemp over historical abuse claims against The Scout Association since the Jimmy Savile scandal emerged. The association and individual Scout leaders have also paid £897,000 in damages, the lawyers for the claimants say. One MP urged an inquiry into failures to pass records of abuse to police. The Scout Association disputed the figures, but said it was "deeply sorry" for anyone hurt by abusers' actions.

In August 2026, Matt Ellett, from Taunton in Somerset, was convicted of 19 sexual offences against multiple children, and subsequently jailed for 20 years and 8 months.

=== Ireland ===
In 2003, John O’Leary, a 42-year-old man and former Scout leader was sentenced to three years in prison. The Cork City resident and father of two was charged with having performed oral sex on an 11-year-old Boy Scout more than 20 years earlier at Scout camps. The victim, who was not named, "said he had gone through hell since he was sexually assaulted, suffering depression and having relationship problems. He said the day in court was a long time coming, and added that because of the abuse, he had been permanently stained for life.”

On May 14, 2020, a report was made public which found that both the Catholic Boy Scouts of Ireland (CBSI) and the Scout Association of Ireland (SAI), which merged to form Scouting Ireland in 2004, protected at least 275 known or suspected sex predators who served in the two organizations and that the cover-up of the abuse spanned decades. Scouting Ireland backed the findings of the report and issued an apology.

=== New Zealand ===
A number of sex abuse cases have occurred in the Scouting movement in New Zealand.

In 1996 Donald John MacFarlane was convicted and fined $15,000 for indecently assaulting two boys. He was a Scout leader for one of the boys. The abuse happened in Southland between January 1972 and December 1974.

In 1999 David John White, a Scout leader in the Porirua suburb of Whitby, pleaded guilty to eight charges of indecently assaulting Scouts at his home between 1984 and 1998. Two other Scout leaders, Thomas Donahue and Neville Palmer from Whitby, were also prosecuted for indecent assault.

Two Auckland Scout leaders, Andrew John Pybus and Nigel Richard Fenemor, were jailed in 2005 for seven years for sexually assaulting two boys under the age of 16.

=== United States ===
There were 2,000 US cases of abuse within the Boy Scouts of America before 1994, and one abuse incident was as recent as 2006. As a result, the Boy Scouts of America, the largest US youth organization with 4 million members, created a sex abuse education and prevention program in the 1980s called the Youth Protection program to help address the problem.

== See also ==
- Jehovah's Witnesses and child sex abuse
- Pederasty
- Peter Zuckerman
- Roman Catholic sex abuse cases
- Sexual misconduct
- Sexual harassment and abuse by teachers
