= Age-of-consent reform in Canada =

Age-of-consent reform in Canada refers to cultural and legal discussions in Canada regarding the age of consent, which was raised in May 2008 as part of the Tackling Violent Crime Act. This applies to all forms of sexual activity.

In May 2008, the Canadian government led by Stephen Harper passed Bill C-22 (introduced in February 2007 and revised in August 2007) to raise the age of consent from 14 to 16, while creating a close-in-age exemption for sex between 14–15 year olds and partners less than 5 years older, and keeping an existing close-in-age clause for sex between 12–13 year olds and partners less than 2 years older. The initiative also maintains a temporary exception for already existing marriages of 14 and 15 year olds, but forbids new marriages like these in the future.

Section 159 of the Criminal Code set the age of consent for anal intercourse at 18 for non-married couples. In June 2019, Bill C-75 passed both houses of the Parliament of Canada and received royal assent, repealing section 159 and making the age of consent equal at 16 for all types of intercourse. Prior to its repeal, section 159 had been held unconstitutional by several courts, including 4 appellate courts, and was deemed unenforceable.

== Previous 1890 law ==
In 1890, the age of consent was raised from 12 to 14.

== Battle against Internet predators ==
Former Toronto Police Service officer Paul Gillespie said the bill would give police "more tools" in the battle against Internet predators. The intention of the bill is to target "sexual predators" and pimps. Other groups that supported the increase in the age of consent were the National Council of Women of Canada (NCWC), the Canada Family Action Coalition (CFAC), Canadian Crime Victim Foundation (CCVF), Beyond Borders Inc. and Canadians Addressing Sexual Exploitation (CASE).

== Case of Dale Eric Beckham ==
One of the motivators for the reform of these laws in Canada was the case of Dale Eric Beckham. In March 2005, Beckham, then 31 years old, travelled from his home in Woodlands, Texas to Ottawa, Ontario to meet with a 14-year-old boy he had met over the internet. The boy's parents, after observing him sneaking away in the middle of the night into a taxi, alerted the police who tracked the cab to a downtown hotel. Police found Beckham and the boy unclothed in a hotel room, where they were engaged in sexual activity; it was later determined that the two had also engaged in sexual intercourse the previous night. Police also discovered hundreds of pornographic images of children on a laptop computer that Beckham had brought with him from Texas. Beckham was arrested and held without bail.

In Beckham's home state of Texas, the age of consent is 17 and violators can face prison terms of up to 10–20 years. In Canada, sexual activity with teenagers as young as 14 was legal (until May 2008) as long as it was consensual and the adult was not in a position of authority or dependency. The boy, who reportedly suffered from social anxiety disorder and had shown signs of being suicidal, insisted during interviews with the police that the sex with Beckham was consensual. Consequently, the only crime Beckham could be prosecuted for in Canada was a relatively minor offense of possession of child pornography. In November 2005, Beckham pleaded guilty and was sentenced to the time already served. He was then ordered deported back to the United States.

After being notified of his arrest in Canada, Immigration and Customs Enforcement (ICE) agents searched Beckham's home in Woodlands, Texas, where they discovered a massive quantity of child pornography on his computer, with some depicting children less than 12 years old engaged in sexual acts with adults. After returning to the United States, Beckham was immediately arrested and held without bond. In July 2007, Beckham pleaded guilty to a federal charge of transporting child pornography to Canada, although his lawyer argued unsuccessfully that Beckham's behaviour was the result of diminished capacity. In November 2007, Beckham was sentenced to 17 years in prison, to be followed by lifetime supervision.

This case raised concerns that child molesters, not just in Canada but also from abroad, were taking advantage of Canada's low age of consent to sexually exploit vulnerable children while escaping criminal prosecution.

== Criticism ==
LGBT rights activists criticized the bill because it did not address the issue of equality and maintained the then-current Canadian age of consent for anal sex outside of marriage at 18. Hillary Cook, a spokeswoman for gay rights group Egale Canada, stated the bill was "an attempt to score partisan points". In June 2019, C-75 passed both houses of the Parliament of Canada and received royal assent, which repealed section 159 effective immediately and made the age of consent equal at 16 for all individuals.

The Canadian AIDS Society stated that "increasing the age of consent could result in young people being more secretive about their sexual practices and not seeking out the information they need. This will place youth at an increased risk of contracting HIV/AIDS and other sexually transmitted infections." The Canadian Children's Rights Council also referenced an article in The Globe and Mail, raising concern this would decrease the pursuit of condoms.

The proposal also received criticism from Andrea Cohen of the former pro-choice organization Canadian Federation for Sexual Health (formerly known as the Planned Parenthood Federation of Canada), who said that the organization believed the legislation did nothing to keep youth from harm. She talked on CTV News Channel's "Mike Duffy Live" where she stated: "What it will do is infringe upon the rights of youth in terms of their ability to make decisions on their own sexuality". In 2007, her organization issued an official position statement. Peter Dudding, executive director of the Child Welfare League of Canada, similarly criticized the bill's effect of removing judicial discretion in cases involving 14- and 15-year-olds: "When we deal with arbitrary cut-offs, we lose the flexibility to apply the law in a much more specific and individualized kind of way."

== See also ==
- Age-of-consent reform
