= Robin Brook (banker) =

British fencer (1908–1998)

Sir Robin Brook CMG OBE
- Brook in 1960

Personal information
- Born: 19 June 1908 Southwark, London, England
- Died: 25 October 1998 (aged 90) Westminster, London, England

Sport
- Sport: Fencing

Sir Ralph Ellis "Robin" Brook CMG OBE (19 June 1908 – 25 October 1998) was a British merchant banker and a director of the Bank of England. His wife Helen Brook was founder of the Brook Advisory Centres.

As a fencer, he competed at the 1936 and 1948 Summer Olympics. In 1936, he won the sabre title at the British Fencing Championships.

The son of a surgeon, Brook was educated, through scholarships, at Eton College and subsequently at King's College, Cambridge, where he studied under Maynard Keynes, earning a double first in Economics.

== Honours ==
Brook was appointed an Officer of the Order of the British Empire (OBE) on 2 August 1945, and a Companion of the Order of St Michael and St George (CMG) in the 1954 New Year Honours.

He was knighted in the 1974 New Year Honours for services to export, in his role as President of the Association of British Chambers of Commerce.
