= Age-of-consent reform in the United Kingdom =

Restrictions on sexual activity involving minors in the United Kingdom and its predecessors have existed since medieval times. During the 1970s, there was some political advocacy in favour of significantly reducing the age of consent. Meanwhile, over a similar time period, the unequal age of consent for straight and gay young people was campaigned against by the LGBTQ rights movement. Arguments have occasionally been made in favour of reducing the age of consent, generally to an earlier point in adolescence. Recently, legislative change towards a staggered age of consent, in which the age difference between sexual partners is taken into account, has started to be widely discussed.

== Legal history ==
In 1275, the first age of consent was set in England, at age 12 (Statute of Westminster I). In 1875, the Offences Against the Person Act raised the age to 13 in Great Britain and Ireland, and ten years later the Criminal Law Amendment Act 1885 raised it to 16. In 1917, a bill raising the age of consent in Great Britain and Ireland from 16 to 17 was defeated by only one vote.

The Parliament of Northern Ireland passed the Children and Young Persons Act (Northern Ireland) 1950, which successfully raised the age of consent to 17. However, in 2008 this enactment was reversed by the Sexual Offences (Northern Ireland) Order 2008, which made the age of consent in Northern Ireland 16, regardless of gender or sexual orientation. The reason given for this change being made was to bring the age of consent into line with the rest of the United Kingdom. The Criminal Justice Minister, Paul Goggins, said there was no compelling reason for the age to be different in Northern Ireland.

The male homosexual age of consent in the England and Wales was set at 21 in the Sexual Offences Act 1967 for "consenting adults in private" (following the recommendations of the Wolfenden Report). In 1980 The Criminal Justice (Scotland) Act (1980) legalised homosexual acts at age 21. The homosexual age of consent was then lowered to 18 in the Criminal Justice and Public Order Act 1994, and finally lowered to 16 (equalising it with the heterosexual age of consent) in England & Wales and Scotland in the Sexual Offences (Amendment) Act 2000.

Currently, the age of consent for penetrative sex, oral sex and mutual masturbation in the United Kingdom is 16 years. Relevant legislation is devolved, meaning that it is up to each UK nation to set their age of consent. However, each nation has set the relevant legal age at 16 (under the Sexual Offences Act 2003 in England and Wales, the Sexual Offences (Scotland) Act 2009 (in Scotland) and the Sexual Offences (Northern Ireland) Order 2008 (in Northern Ireland).

This means that in each UK nation, if an individual is to have sex with someone 15 or less, they may be charged with a criminal offence.

Similarly, the Sexual Offences (Amendment) Act 2000 prohibits someone in a position of trust from performing sexual acts with someone who cannot consent, which includes minors, and "very vulnerable people".

== Advocacy ==
=== Reduction ===
==== 1970s ====
The decriminalisation of sex between men over the age of 21 convinced some paedophiles that they might soon be able to change the law and social attitudes to allow for their desire to have sex with children. The Paedophile Information Exchange was an organisation with around 300 members which used its links inside government and the civil liberties movement to lobby for the decriminalisation of sex with children as young as four years old. Arguments around relaxing age-of-consent laws relating to adolescents in particular did also have a wider reach. Sociologist Matthew Waites, author of The age of Consent – Young People, Sexuality and Citizenship, observed that:

By the mid-1970s the case for a lower minimum age for all was finding wider support, with questions being posed concerning the merits of lowering the legal age for male/female sexual behaviour – not only within grassroots sexual movements, but also within religious organisations and liberal intellectual circles. [...] Significant sections of liberal opinion in the political mainstream, including prominent campaigners for children’s interests and sexual health, support at least some selective decriminalisation of sexual activity between young people under 18.

In August 1971 young members of the Gay Liberation Front organised a public rally in London to protest at the age of consent for gay men.

In April 1972, the Society of Friends Social Responsibility Council (a Quaker conference), passed a resolution in favour of lowering the age of consent in Britain from 16 to 14. In July of that year, Dr. John Robinson, Dean of Trinity College, Cambridge, and chair of the UK's Sexual Law Reform Society, defended an age of consent of 14 in a lecture at a Methodist Conference.

In May 1974, the Campaign for Homosexual Equality suggested a basic age of consent of 16, but that could be as low as 12 "in cases where a defendant could prove the existence of meaningful consent". The Sexual Law Reform Society proposed in September of that year lowering the age of consent to 14, with the requirement that below the age of 18 the burden of proof that consent for sexual activities between the parties existed would be the responsibility of the older participant.

In March 1976, the National Council for Civil Liberties (NCCL), called for an equal age of consent of 14, or 10, in Britain. The submission to the Criminal Law Revision Committee generated extensive newspaper coverage. While the report argued that abolishing the age of consent would be beneficial, it proposed retaining a prohibition on sex under the age of 14 "as a compromise with public attitudes", stating that "although it is both logical and consistent with modern knowledge about child development, to suggest that the age of consent should be abolished, we fear that, given the present state of public attitudes on this topic, it will not be politically possible to abolish the age of consent". They also argued that "childhood sexual experiences, willingly engaged in, with an adult result in no identifiable damage" and suggested that more harm was caused when the children retold their experiences in court or to the press. The submission was signed by Harriet Harman, who was a legal officer for the NCCL at the time before becoming an MP in 1982. Harman denies ever supporting the age of consent being lowered to 10, and claimed that right-wing newspapers the Daily Mail and The Telegraph had tried to make her "guilty by association" with fringe groups that had previously been connected to the NCCL.

==== More recent arguments ====
By the end of the 20th century, those in favour of reducing the age of consent were pointing to faster physical development and increasing levels of sexual activity among adolescents as reasoning. Moreover, new academic work, particularly in sociology, writing on human sexual behaviour debated prohibitions on sexual activity involving children.

Although he did not favour total abolition, Francis Bennion, a British liberal humanist also influenced by the historical context of the issue, emphasised the fact that children are "sexual beings", concluding that this in itself makes legal prohibitions unfair.

Miranda Sawyer, British journalist specialised in music and youth culture, suggested that "we have sexual feelings from a very early age", considering that sex is "natural behaviour". She favoured lowering the age of consent to 12 in the UK while labeling the criminalisation of sexual activity under the age of 16 as "laughably unrealistic".

In November 2013, public health expert and Faculty of Public Health president, Professor John Ashton, called for the age of consent to be lowered to 15. He said that the current legal limit prevented sexually active younger teenagers from getting support with issues of disease and contraception. He said that official figures indicated as many as a third of all 14- and 15-year-olds are having sex in Britain and said that a nationwide debate was needed to discuss the benefits of lowering the present age of consent of 16. The call was rejected by then Prime Minister David Cameron and then Deputy Prime Minister Nick Clegg that same year.

=== Staggered age of consent ===
In November 2026, following the rape and sexual assault conviction of Russell Brand, and the publication of serious allegations against David Walliams, campaigners called for a staggered age of consent to be introduced in the UK. Staggered age of consent legislature takes into account the age difference between sexual partners. The primary campaign for graduated age of consent laws, Close the Consent Gap, suggests making it a criminal offence for a person aged 20 or older to engage in sexual activity with a person aged 16–17, unless the age difference is no more than three years.

Charlotte Proudman, a barrister specialising in violence against women and girls, told The Guardian that such legislative reform would address the "significant power imbalance between children and much older adults, particularly where grooming, financial dependence, celebrity status or emotional manipulation are involved".

On 15 November, 2026, the government said that they would consider changing the law to a staggered age of consent.

== Research ==
Research by Jean Golding showed that by the early 2000s puberty was occurring earlier than in the 1970s, with an average age of menarche in girls now at 12 years and 10 months, compared to the average age of 14 for puberty in general that was accepted as evidence by the Policy Advisory Committee of the 1970s. Golding's research has found that "one girl in six hits puberty at the age of eight".

According to British research conducted by the Centre for Family and Household Research in the 1990s, "an increasing proportion of young people are sexually active below the age of consent". Additionally, the UK's first National Survey of Sexual Attitudes and Lifestyles (NATSAL), which collected data up to 1990, found that a high proportion of young people engage in other forms of sexual activity prohibited by the law, including mutual masturbation and oral sex, beginning on average at the age of 14.

Waites also observed that "qualitative research reveals a picture of many young people negotiating sexual behaviour in a context of secrecy, constrained by power relationships while lacking confidence, resources and support". He added, "It is argued by some sexual health professionals that the age of consent should be lowered [...] to facilitate more effective support from health and education services".

== Public opinion ==
In November 2000, an internet poll of 42,000 girls aged 12 to 16 was conducted. "Nine out of 10 respondents did not believe in waiting until marriage to have sex, while 87 per cent said the age of consent should be lowered from 16. Sex education was criticised as outdated, uninformative and taught too late, with little structured literature about sexually transmitted diseases, same-sex relationships and how to deal with pregnancy". Those surveyed also said that free condoms should be provided in girls' toilets and that the £60 million drive by the government to halve teenage conceptions would have been better spent on clinics for young people wanting confidential advice.

== See also ==
- Adolescent sexuality in the United Kingdom
- Age-of-consent reform in Canada
- Ages of consent in Europe
- Constitutional reform in the United Kingdom
- French petitions against age-of-consent laws
- Statutory rape
