= Prevalence of teenage pregnancy =

Adolescent fertility 15 19

Fertility rate among girls aged 10 to 14

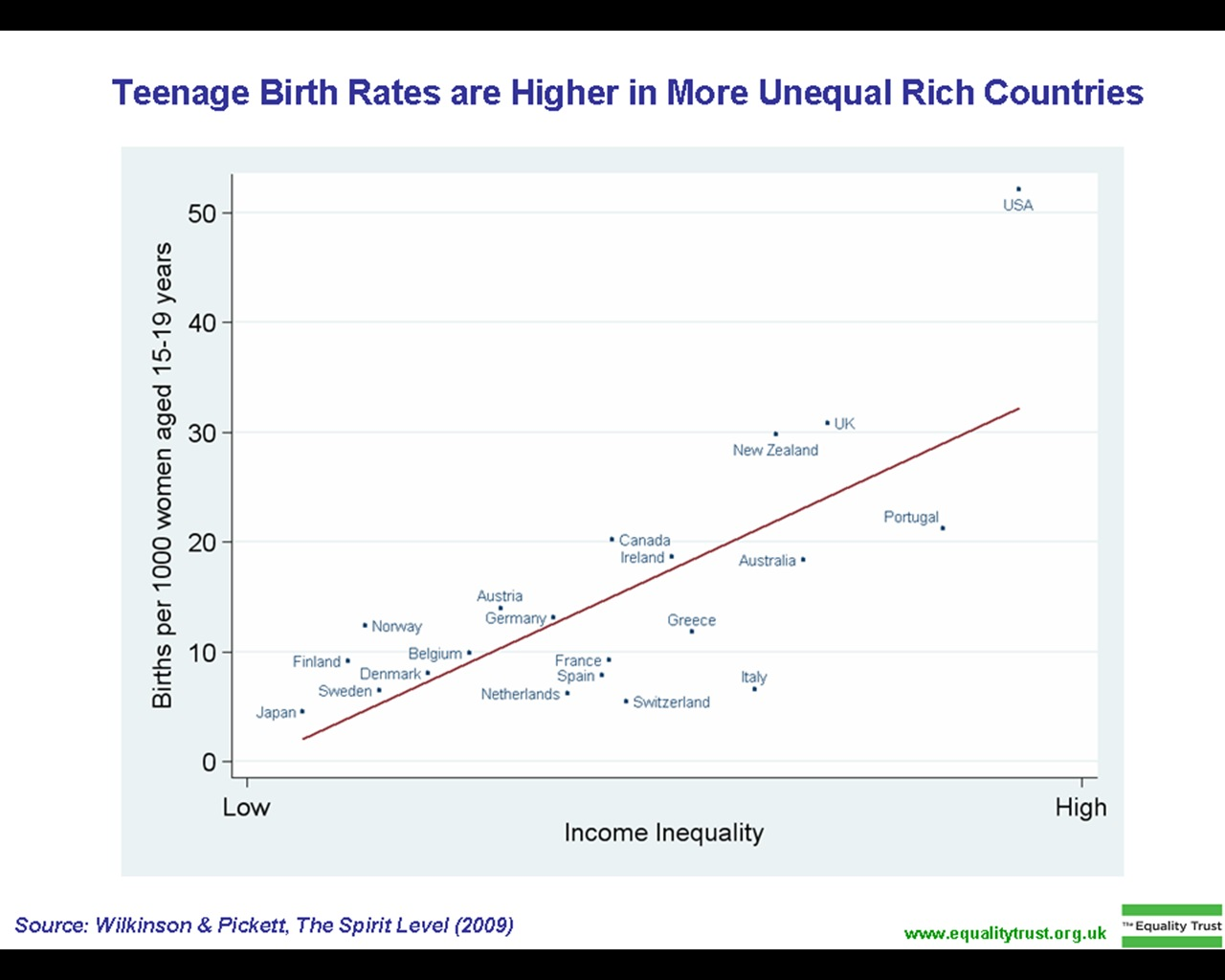
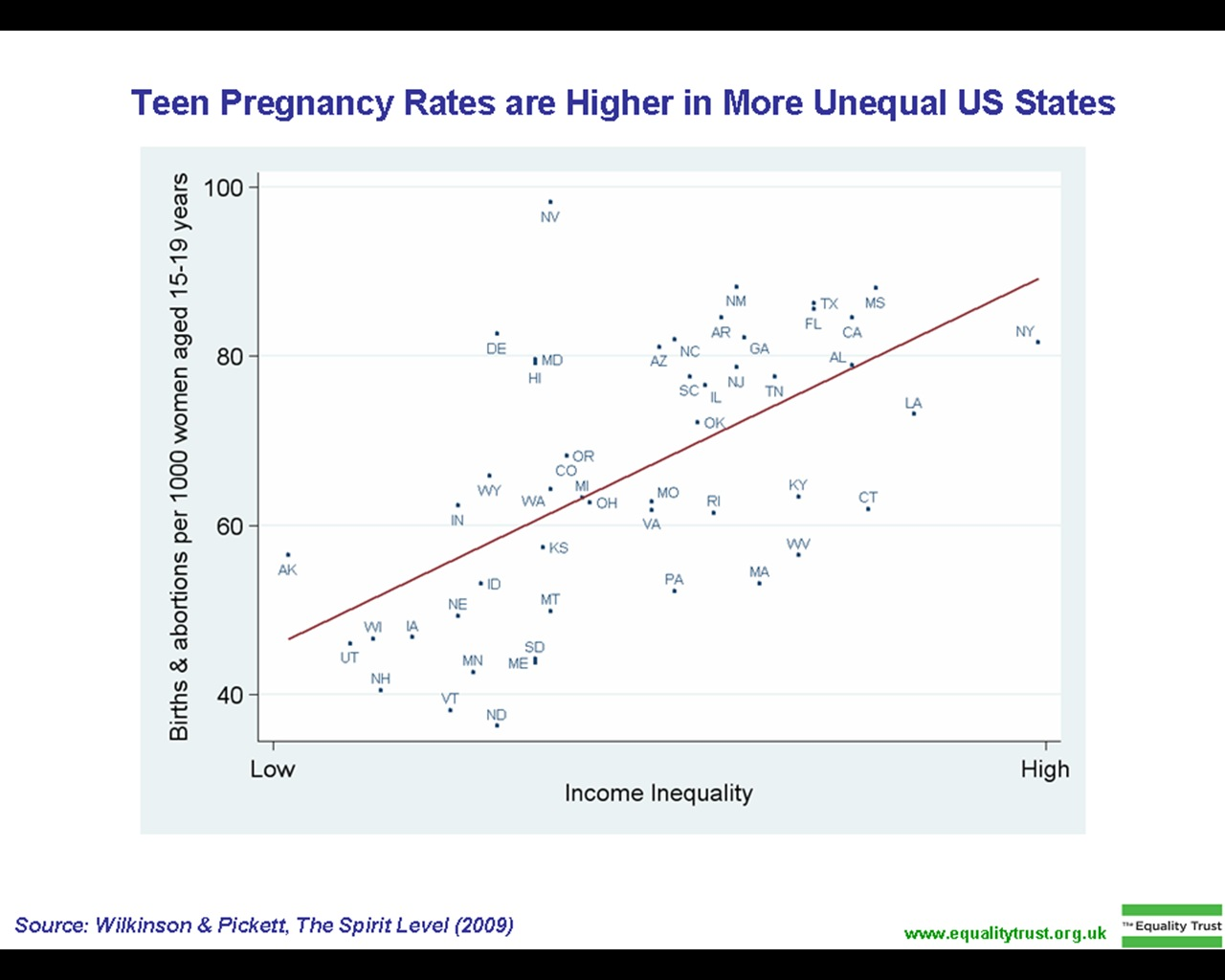
Teen pregnancy rates are higher in more unequal countries and in more unequal US states. Data is from 2009.

The Western world and the non-Western world have distinctly different rates of teenage pregnancy. In the Western world such as the United States, Canada, Western Europe, Australia, and New Zealand, teen parents tend to be unmarried, and adolescent pregnancy is seen as a social issue.

By contrast, teenage parents in the non-Western world such as Africa, Asia, Eastern Europe, Latin America, and the Pacific Islands are often married, and their pregnancy may be welcomed by family and society. However, in these societies, early pregnancy may combine with malnutrition and poor health care to cause long-term medical problems for both the mother and child. A report by Save the Children found that, annually, 13 million children are born to women under age 20 worldwide. More than 90% of these births occur to women living in developing countries. Complications of pregnancy and childbirth are the leading cause of mortality among women between the ages of 15 and 19 in such areas, as they are the leading cause of mortality among older women.

The age of the mother is determined by the easily verified date when the pregnancy ends, not by the estimated date of conception. Consequently, the statistics do not include women who first became pregnant before their 20th birthdays, if those pregnancies did not end until on or after their 20th birthdays.

== Rates by continent ==
=== Africa ===
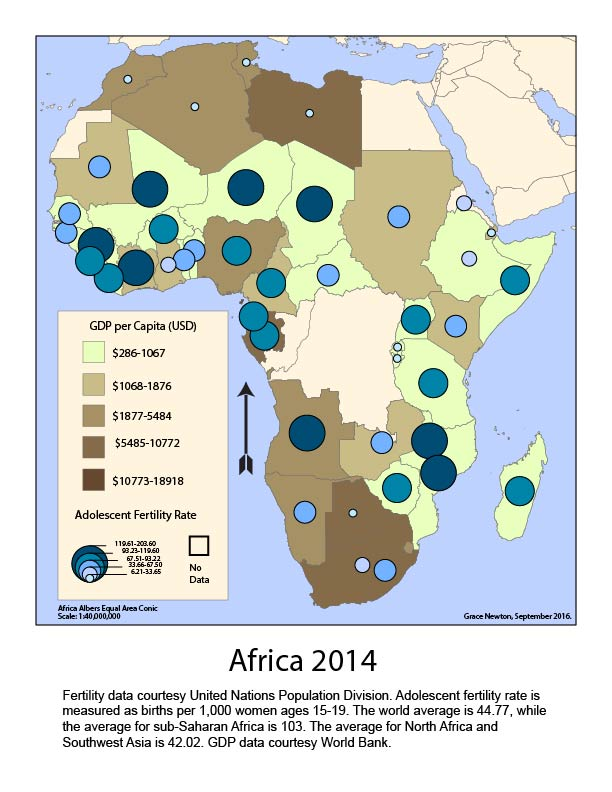
Adolescent fertility correlates strongly with poverty in African nations.

The highest rate of teenage pregnancy in the world—143 per 1,000 girls aged 15–19 years—is in sub-Saharan Africa. Women in Africa, in general, get married at a much younger age than women elsewhere—leading to earlier pregnancies. In Nigeria in 1992, 47% of women aged 20–24 were married before 15, and 87% before 18. 53% of those surveyed had given birth to a child before the age of 18. In 2002, African countries had the highest rates of teenage birth.

In 2015, the highest incidence of births among 15- to 19-year-old girls was in Niger, Mali, Angola, Guinea, and Mozambique. In Mozambique, in 2015, 46% of girls aged 15 to 19 years were already mothers or pregnant, an increase of 9% between results found on the National Demographic Health Survey in 2011 and National Survey on HIV, Malaria and Reproductive Health (IMASIDA) 2015. With the exception of Maputo, the capital city, all provinces presented an increase in the percentage of early pregnancies. The rates are particularly higher in the northern provinces, namely, Cabo Delgado, Nampula and Niassa with 64.9%, 61.3% and 60%, respectively.

A 2004 Save the Children report identified 10 countries where motherhood carried the most risks for young women and their babies. Of these, 9 were in sub-Saharan Africa. Niger, Liberia, and Mali were the nations where girls were the most at-risk. In the 10 highest-risk nations, more than one in six teenage girls between 15 and 19 years old gave birth annually, and nearly one in seven babies born to these teenagers died before the age of one year.

=== Asia ===
The rate of early marriage is higher in rural regions than in urbanized areas. Fertility rates in South Asia range from 71 to 119 births with a trend towards increasing age at marriage for both sexes. In South Korea and Singapore, although the occurrence of sexual intercourse before marriage has risen, rates of adolescent childbearing are low at 4 to 8 per 1,000. The rate of early marriage and pregnancy has decreased sharply in Indonesia. However, it remains high in comparison to the rest of Asia.

Surveys from Thailand have found that a significant minority of unmarried adolescents are sexually active. Although premarital sex is considered normal behavior for males, particularly with prostitutes, it is not always regarded as such for females. Most Thai youth reported that their first sexual experience, whether within or outside of marriage, was without contraception. The adolescent fertility rate in Thailand is relatively high at 60 per 1,000. 25% of women admitted to hospitals in Thailand for complications of induced abortion are students. The Thai government has undertaken measures to inform the nation's youth about the prevention of sexually transmitted diseases and unplanned pregnancy.

In 1998, in several Asian countries including Bangladesh and Indonesia, a large proportion (26–37%) of deaths among female adolescents were attributed to maternal causes.

=== Australia ===
In 2015, the birth rate among teenage women in Australia was 11.9 births per 1,000 women. The rate has fallen from 55.5 births per 1,000 women in 1971, probably due to ease of access to effective birth control, rather than any decrease in sexual activity.

=== Europe ===
The overall trend in Europe since 1970 has been a decrease in the total fertility rate, an increase in the age at which women experience their first birth, and a decrease in the number of births among teenagers.

The rates of teenage pregnancy may vary widely within a country. For instance, in the United Kingdom, the rate of adolescent pregnancy in 2002 was as high as 100.4 per 1000 among young women living in the London Borough of Lambeth, and as low as 20.2 per 1000 among residents in the Midlands local authority area of Rutland.

Teenage birth is often associated with economic and social issues such as alcohol and drug misuse. In 2001, across 13 nations in the European Union, women who gave birth as teenagers were twice as likely to be living in poverty, compared with those who first gave birth when they were over 20.

==== Bulgaria and Romania ====
Romania and Bulgaria have some of the highest teenage birth rates in Europe. In 2015, Bulgaria had a birth rate of 37 per 1,000 women aged 15–19. Romania had a teen birth rate of 34 per 1,000 women aged 15–19. Both countries also have very large Romani populations, who have an occurrence of teenage pregnancies well above the local average.

In recent years, the number of teenage mothers is declining in Bulgaria.

Number of teenage mothers in Bulgaria in the period 1990–2016
Year	1990	1995	2000	2005	2010	2015
All live births in Bulgaria	105,180	71,967	73,679	69,886	75,513	65,950
Mothers aged under twenty	22,518	16,278	12,787	10,625	8,411	6,274
Share of teenage mothers	▲21.4%	▲22.6%	▼17.4%	▼15.2%	▼11.1%	▼9.5%

==== Netherlands ====
The Netherlands has a low rate of births and abortions among teenagers, with 5 births per 1,000 women aged 15–19 in 2002. Compared with countries with higher teenage birth rates, the Dutch have a higher average age at first intercourse and increased levels of contraceptive use, including the "double Dutch" method of using both a hormonal contraception method and a condom.

==== Nordic countries ====
Nordic countries, such as Denmark and Sweden, have low rates of teenage birth. Both had 7 births per 1,000 women aged 15–19 in 2002. Norway's birth rate is slightly higher, at 11 births per 1,000 women aged 15–19 in 2002. Iceland had a birth rate of 19 per 1,000 women aged 15–19 in 2002. These countries have higher abortion rates than the Netherlands.

==== Greece, Italy, Spain and Portugal ====
In Italy and Spain, the rate of adolescent pregnancy is low, at 6 births per 1,000 women aged 15–19 in 2002 in both countries. These two countries also have low abortion rates, lower than Sweden and the other Nordic countries, and their teenage pregnancy rates are among the lowest in Europe. Greece had 10 births per 1,000 women aged 15–19 in 2002. Portugal had 17 births per 1,000 women aged 15–19 in 2002.

==== United Kingdom ====
In 2018, conception rates for under 18-year-olds in England and Wales declined by 6.1%, to 16.8 conceptions per 1,000 women aged 15 to 17 years. Since 1999, conception rates for women aged under 18 years have decreased by 62.7%.

=== The Americas ===
==== Canada ====
In 2002, the Canadian teenage birth rate was 16 per 1,000. The teenage pregnancy rate was 33.9 per 1,000. The Canadian teenage pregnancy rate declined for both younger (15–17) and older (18–19) teens between 1992 and 2002. Canada's highest teen pregnancy rates occur in small towns located in rural parts of peninsular Ontario. Alberta and Quebec have high teen pregnancy rates as well.

==== Colombia ====
In 2016, the Minister of Health and Social Protection of Colombia, Alejandro Gaviria Uribe announced that "teenage pregnancy decreased by two percentage points breaking the growing tendency that had been seen since the nineties".

==== United States ====
Teen birth rates have declined over the past few decades.

In 2013, the teenage birth rate in the United States reached a historic low: 26.6 births per 1,000 women aged 15–19. More than three-quarters of these births are to women aged 18 or 19. In 2005 in the U.S., 57% of teen pregnancies resulted in a live birth, 27% ended in an induced abortion, and 16% in a fetal loss.

In 2002, the US teen birth rate was 53 births per 1,000 women aged 15–19, the highest in the developed world. If all pregnancies, including those that end in abortion or miscarriage, are taken into account, the total rate in 2000 was 75.4 pregnancies per 1,000 girls. In 2004, Nevada and the District of Columbia had the highest teen pregnancy rates in the US. In 2004, North Dakota had the lowest.

In 2008, over 80% of teenage pregnancies in the U.S. were unintended. In 2008, approximately one third ended in abortion, one third ended in spontaneous miscarriage, and one third continued their pregnancy and kept their baby.

The trend is decreasing. In 1990, the birth rate was 61.8, and the pregnancy rate 116.9 per thousand. This decline has manifested across all races. Teenagers of African-American and Latino descent retain a higher rate, in comparison to that of European-Americans and Asian-Americans. In 2004, the Guttmacher Institute attributed about 25% of the decline to abstinence and 75% to the effective use of contraceptives.

Within the United States teen pregnancy is often brought up in political discourse. The goal to limit teen pregnancy is shared by Republicans and Democrats, though avenues of reduction are usually different. Many Democrats cite teen pregnancy as proof of the continuing need for access to birth control and sexual education, while Republicans often cite a need for returning to conservative values, often including abstinence.

An inverse correlation has been noted between teen pregnancy rates and the quality of education in a state. A positive correlation, albeit weak, appears between a city's teen pregnancy rate and its average summer night temperature, especially in the Southern U.S. (Savageau, compiler, 1993–1995).

In 2022, research organization Child Trends found that teen birth in the United States had vastly reduced in the prior 30 years.

== Statistics ==
=== World Development Indicator ===
The birth rate for women aged 15–19 is one of the World Bank's World Development Indicators. The data for most countries and a variety of groupings (e.g. Sub-Saharan Africa or OECD members) are published regularly, and can be viewed or downloaded from a United Nations website.

=== UN Statistics Division, live birth 2009 ===
Per 1,000 women 15–19 years old:

Country	Teenage birth rate per 1000 women 15–19	Year
South Korea	1.8	2009
Hong Kong	3.5	2009
Switzerland	4.1	2009
Japan	4.9	2009
Netherlands	5.3	2009
Slovenia	5.4	2009
Denmark	5.5	2009
Sweden	5.9	2009
Cyprus	6.0	2009
Tunisia	6.0	2007
Italy	6.8	2005
Luxembourg	7.1	2009
Singapore	7.2	2009
Norway	9.5	2009
Germany	9.8	2008
France	10.2	2008
Austria	10.4	2009
Faeroe Islands	10.5	2007
Greece	11.6	2009
Czech Republic	11.8	2009
Spain	12.2	2009
Croatia	13.0	2009
Israel	13.4	2009
Bahrain	13.7	2008
Malaysia	13.9	2008
Canada	14.2	2008
Kuwait	14.4	2008
Albania	14.5	2004
Iceland	14.5	2009
Bosnia and Herzegovina	14.9	2009
Portugal	15.3	2009
Qatar	15.9	2009
Poland	16.2	2009
Ireland	16.3	2009
Australia	16.5	2009
Lithuania	16.9	2009
Tonga	17.5	2003
Bermuda	17.7	2009
Maldives	18.0	2009
Mongolia	19.3	2008
Hungary	19.5	2009
Martinique	19.8	2007
North Macedonia	19.9	2009
Malta	20.2	2009
Pakistan	20.3	2005
Estonia	20.4	2009
Latvia	20.8	2009
Uzbekistan	21.1	2000
Sri Lanka	21.2	2006
Serbia	21.7	2009
Slovakia	21.8	2009
Belarus	21.9	2006
Montenegro	22.5	2009
UK	25.0	2009
Guadeloupe	25.5	2003
Moldova	27.0	2009
Armenia	27.6	2009
Morocco	28.3	2001
Ukraine	29.3	2007
New Zealand	29.4	2009
Fiji	29.7	2004
Russia	30.2	2009
Palau	30.8	2005
Kazakhstan	31.1	2008
Kyrgyzstan	31.2	2009
Egypt	31.2	2009
Netherlands Antilles	31.7	2007
Mauritius	31.9	2009
Cayman Islands	34.1	2009
Bhutan	36.5	2005
Georgia	36.6	2006
Liberia	37.4	2008
Aruba	39.3	2009
Romania	39.3	2009
Azerbaijan	41.4	2009
United States	41.5	2008
Timor-Leste	42.2	2004
Saint Lucia	43.9	2005
Réunion	44.1	2007
Dominica	45.8	2006
Bulgaria	46.7	2009
Cuba	50.5	2009
Namibia	51.2	2001
Grenada	53.1	2000
US Virgin Islands	53.1	2007
Puerto Rico	54.6	2008
Chile	54.9	2008
Uruguay	58.8	2007
Greenland	63.0	2009
Costa Rica	63.0	2009
Suriname	65.5	2007
Argentina	67.7	2009
Swaziland	71.0	2007
El Salvador	73.9	2007
French Guiana	83.3	2007
Panama	88.4	2009
Malawi	101.5	2008
Venezuela	101.8	2007
Senegal	115.6	2002

=== UN Statistics Division, estimates 1995-2010 ===
Per 1,000 women 15–19 years old:

Country	1995–2000	2000–2005	2005–2010
Afghanistan	212.4	161.2	118.7
Albania	11.8	17.4	17.9
Algeria	11.8	8.5	7.3
Angola	215.1	201.0	171.1
Argentina	69.8	60.7	56.9
Armenia	53.0	37.9	35.7
Aruba	47.3	41.1	33.4
Australia	19.2	16.7	16.5
Austria	14.6	13.5	12.8
Azerbaijan	41.0	33.6	33.8
Bahamas	61.9	44.0	31.8
Bahrain	17.9	15.7	14.9
Bangladesh	130.5	105.9	78.9
Barbados	56.2	42.1	42.6
Belarus	33.2	23.9	22.1
Belgium	22.7	16.1	14.2
Belize	106.3	91.2	78.7
Benin	123.3	117.4	111.7
Bhutan	75.0	58.3	50.2
Bolivia	86.9	84.4	78.2
Bosnia and Herzegovina	27.0	18.2	16.4
Botswana	73.3	61.2	52.1
Brazil	89.7	86.0	75.6
Brunei Darussalam	28.8	26.2	25.1
Bulgaria	50.6	44.8	42.8
Burkina Faso	136.2	130.4	124.8
Burundi	40.1	29.0	18.6
Cambodia	53.3	45.4	41.8
Cameroon	142.8	136.2	127.8
Canada	20.1	15.0	14.0
Cape Verde	105.8	94.7	81.6
Central African Republic	134.4	122.5	106.6
Chad	193.4	189.6	164.5
Channel Islands	13.8	11.9	9.9
Chile	66.9	61.6	58.3
China	6.8	8.2	8.4
Hong Kong	5.0	4.0	3.2
Macao	6.1	4.0	3.0
Colombia	91.7	95.7	74.3
Comoros	66.5	63.6	58.0
Republic of the Congo	130.2	130.5	118.7
Costa Rica	86.9	76.4	65.6
Côte d'Ivoire	136.4	134.9	129.4
Croatia	17.8	14.4	13.5
Cuba	67.9	50.3	45.2
Cyprus	13.1	7.2	6.6
Czech Republic	16.7	11.4	11.1
North Korea	1.4	1.0	0.7
Democratic Republic of the Congo	242.0	230.6	201.4
Denmark	8.0	6.6	6.0
Djibouti	31.1	28.8	22.9
Dominican Republic	111.0	109.6	108.7
Ecuador	85.4	84.5	82.8
Egypt	58.8	52.5	46.6
El Salvador	111.5	91.9	82.7
Equatorial Guinea	133.9	128.8	122.9
Eritrea	98.7	83.2	66.6
Estonia	30.5	22.3	22.7
Ethiopia	111.5	97.2	72.4
Fiji	45.8	41.5	45.2
Finland	9.6	13.1	9.3
France	7.2	8.0	7.2
French Guiana	120.8	103.1	82.7
French Polynesia	61.3	55.6	51.1
Gabon	130.1	107.1	89.9
Gambia	130.9	102.8	76.6
Georgia	60.5	48.5	44.7
Germany	12.8	10.4	7.9
Ghana	90.1	79.9	71.1
Greece	11.7	10.7	11.6
Grenada	61.5	51.2	42.4
Guadeloupe	21.8	20.1	19.5
Guam	78.2	54.5	51.5
Guatemala	121.1	115.4	107.2
Guinea	174.4	165.7	157.4
Guinea-Bissau	147.3	130.6	111.1
Guyana	73.9	82.4	68.3
Haiti	61.8	52.5	46.4
Honduras	114.6	102.5	93.1
Hungary	27.0	18.5	16.5
Iceland	23.5	17.3	14.6
India	116.1	98.6	86.3
Indonesia	47.8	49.1	45.1
Iran	48.4	33.5	29.5
Iraq	57.1	71.2	98.0
Ireland	19.0	19.0	17.5
Israel	17.7	16.0	14.0
Italy	7.0	7.0	6.7
Jamaica	93.5	85.4	77.3
Japan	4.4	5.8	5.0
Jordan	40.6	31.0	26.5
Kazakhstan	40.0	28.4	30.0
Kenya	105.7	104.2	100.2
Kuwait	26.9	16.1	13.8
Kyrgyzstan	37.6	31.5	34.1
Laos	55.5	52.0	39.0
Latvia	21.9	16.6	18.0
Lebanon	32.0	19.8	16.2
Lesotho	94.0	89.6	73.5
Liberia	152.2	146.1	142.6
Libya	4.7	3.8	3.2
Lithuania	32.2	20.6	19.7
Luxembourg	10.1	11.8	10.1
Madagascar	155.1	149.5	134.3
Malawi	160.9	159.1	119.2
Malaysia	15.0	15.2	14.2
Maldives	46.6	23.0	12.2
Mali	190.9	189.5	186.3
Malta	16.5	16.2	17.3
Martinique	26.0	25.1	22.5
Mauritania	96.5	88.0	79.2
Mauritius	36.3	36.5	35.4
Mayotte	86.0	106.0	102.5
Mexico	77.8	74.4	70.6
Federated States of Micronesia	44.8	34.3	25.4
Mongolia	32.8	21.8	20.8
Montenegro	23.4	20.9	18.2
Morocco	27.1	19.5	15.1
Mozambique	117.0	176.4	149.2
Myanmar	23.7	19.3	16.3
Namibia	90.4	81.7	74.4
Nepal	129.1	119.9	103.4
Netherlands	6.2	7.1	5.1
Netherlands Antilles	43.5	36.7	31.7
New Caledonia	16.3	19.0	20.0
New Zealand	31.5	27.1	30.9
Nicaragua	132.6	119.4	112.7
Niger	220.6	213.5	207.1
Nigeria	135.2	127.2	118.3
Norway	12.6	9.6	9.0
Occupied Palestinian Territory	96.5	71.4	53.5
Oman	43.2	18.1	9.2
Pakistan	60.0	41.3	31.6
Panama	93.2	89.0	82.6
Papua New Guinea	75.6	71.0	66.9
Paraguay	91.9	82.3	72.3
Peru	70.5	61.5	54.7
Philippines	49.1	53.9	54.1
Poland	20.4	14.9	14.8
Portugal	20.7	20.2	16.8
Puerto Rico	72.4	65.0	53.8
Qatar	24.2	18.6	16.2
South Korea	3.0	2.2	2.3
Republic of Moldova	58.1	37.4	33.8
Réunion	23.4	36.0	44.7
Romania	41.9	35.0	32.0
Russian Federation	35.7	27.9	30.0
Rwanda	53.5	44.7	38.7
Saint Lucia	69.8	62.0	61.7
Saint Vincent and the Grenadines	76.1	64.6	58.9
Samoa	45.4	36.8	28.3
São Tomé and Príncipe	94.6	80.0	66.1
Saudi Arabia	37.3	20.6	11.6
Senegal	112.4	107.7	105.9
Serbia	28.0	25.8	22.1
Sierra Leone	150.9	143.4	143.7
Singapore	8.0	7.0	4.8
Slovakia	27.4	20.7	20.2
Slovenia	12.8	8.5	5.0
Solomon Islands	71.1	70.1	70.3
Somalia	72.5	71.9	70.1
South Africa	80.6	70.7	59.2
Spain	8.1	10.3	12.7
Sri Lanka	28.0	27.9	23.6
Sudan	87.1	73.6	61.9
Suriname	50.8	44.8	39.5
Swaziland	109.4	102.4	83.9
Sweden	8.9	8.1	6.0
Switzerland	5.7	5.3	4.6
Syrian Arab Republic	51.9	45.5	42.8
Tajikistan	35.8	31.5	28.4
North Macedonia	33.4	26.3	22.0
Thailand	45.8	43.6	43.3
Timor-Leste	71.9	70.1	65.8
Togo	93.9	78.9	65.3
Tonga	22.5	21.3	22.3
Trinidad and Tobago	42.1	35.4	34.7
Tunisia	8.4	6.5	5.7
Turkey	52.0	42.8	39.2
Turkmenistan	17.8	23.0	19.5
Uganda	191.0	172.5	149.9
Ukraine	43.0	29.5	30.8
United Arab Emirates	27.6	24.9	26.7
United Kingdom	31.0	27.0	29.6
Tanzania	133.3	132.0	130.4
United States of America	50.5	43.1	41.2
United States Virgin Islands	51.9	37.6	29.2
Uruguay	67.3	63.5	61.1
Uzbekistan	41.5	14.3	13.8
Vanuatu	62.0	58.1	54.0
Venezuela	94.1	92.1	89.9
Vietnam	27.1	25.8	26.8
Western Sahara	56.5	32.7	21.4
Yemen	109.1	91.2	78.8
Zambia	143.1	159.6	146.8
Zimbabwe	106.3	75.2	64.6
World	66.8	60.4	55.7

=== Birth and abortion rates, 1996 ===
Per 1,000 women 15–19 (% aborted = % of teenage pregnancies ending in abortion):

Country	birth rate	abortion rate	combined rate	% aborted
Netherlands	7.7	3.9	11.6	33.6
Spain	7.5	4.9	12.4	39.5
Italy	6.9	6.7	13.3	50.4
Greece	12.2	1.3	13.5	9.6
Belgium	9.9	5.2	15.1	34.4
Germany	13.0	5.3	18.3	28.9
Finland	9.8	9.6	19.4	49.5
Ireland	16.7	4.6	21.3	21.6
France	9.4	13.2	22.6	58.4
Denmark	8.2	15.4	23.6	65.3
Sweden	7.7	17.7	25.4	69.7
Norway	13.6	18.3	31.9	57.4
Czech Republic	20.1	12.4	32.5	38.2
Iceland	21.5	20.6	42.1	48.9
Slovakia	30.5	13.1	43.6	30
Australia	20.1	23.9	44	54.3
Canada	22.3	22.1	44.4	49.8
Israel	32.0	14.3	46.3	30.9
United Kingdom	29.6	21.3	50.9	41.8
New Zealand	33.4	22.5	55.9	40.3
Hungary	29.9	30.2	60.1	50.2
Romania	40.0	37.9	77.9	48.7
United States	55.6	30.2	85.8	35.2

== See also ==
- Adolescent sexuality in the United States
- Teenage pregnancy in the United Kingdom
