= Jehovah's Witnesses' handling of child sexual abuse =

Various individuals, courts and the media around the world have raised concerns about the manner in which cases of child sexual abuse are handled when they occur in congregations of Jehovah's Witnesses. An independent 2009 study in Norway was critical of how Jehovah's Witnesses dealt with cases of child sexual abuse but stated there is no indication that the rate of sexual abuse among Jehovah's Witnesses is higher than found in general society. The organization's stated position is that it abhors child sexual abuse.

In 2015, it was disclosed that the Australia Branch of Jehovah's Witnesses had records of 1,006 alleged perpetrators of child sexual abuse, relating to more than 1,800 victims since 1950, none of which were reported to police by the group. Some media and courts have reported that Jehovah's Witnesses employ organizational policies, which the group says are Bible-based, that make the reporting of sexual abuse difficult for members. Some victims of sexual abuse have said they were ordered by local elders to maintain silence to avoid embarrassment to both the accused and the organization.

In 2002, Jehovah's Witnesses' Office of Public Information published its policy for elders to report allegations of child abuse to the authorities where required by law, even if there was only one witness. In 2016 a UK judge upheld a ruling against the Jehovah's Witnesses for failing to protect a victim of child sexual abuse, and the Supreme Court rejected an attempt by the Watch Tower Society to block a Charity Commission inquiry into how the organisation's charity handles allegations of abuse. This was the culmination of two years of legal proceedings in five different courts and tribunals. The commission's attorney said, "WTBTS has at every stage relentlessly challenged the legal basis and scope of the Charity Commission's inquiry".

== Policies ==
=== 'Two witness rule' ===
Jehovah's Witnesses' congregational judicial policies require the testimony of two material witnesses to establish a perpetrator's serious sin in the absence of confession. The organization considers this policy to be a protection against malicious accusations of sexual assault and states that this two-witness policy is applied solely to congregational discipline and has no bearing on whether a crime is reported to the authorities in countries where this is mandatory. DNA evidence, medical reports, or information from forensic experts or police that proves sexual abuse may be accepted as a valid "second witness", however critics argue that without mandatory reporting for all accusations of abuse regardless of the local laws, such evidence could remain undetected. The UK Independent Inquiry into Child Sexual Abuse was critical of Jehovah's Witnesses' policy that there must be two witnesses to cases of abuse before elders would consider the allegation. IICSA maintained the policy overlooks the fact that "child sexual abuse is most often perpetrated in the absence of witnesses". This approach has also been criticized for its focus on determining guilt overlooking the seriousness of the initial abuse and allowing a pedophile to go unpunished until they have been caught abusing multiple victims.

=== Questioning the victim ===
A Watch Tower Society representative testified that the organization does not consider itself responsible for the "physical protection" of children in the community. Victims of abuse are required to provide details of their abuse to a group of male elders, which may cause additional trauma; elders are directed that a victim must not be required to face their abuser to present an accusation, however, adult victims may do so if they wish.

=== Reproof and restrictions ===
Former child molesters, including those who molested children before becoming Jehovah's Witnesses and others reinstated into the congregation, are subject to a number of restrictions. Commenting on the effect of these restrictions, Jehovah's Witnesses' legal representative, Mario Moreno, stated that these restrictions alert members that the individual "lacks spiritual maturity." An abuser who is judged repentant by a committee of elders is given a 'public reproof', wherein it is announced to the congregation that the named individual "has been reproved", though the specific reason for reproof is not stated. A few weeks later, a talk may be given to the congregation, discussing the type of sin and the need to be on guard against it, but the reproved individual is not named in connection with this talk. It is the intention that the talk about the type of sin, and the previously made announcement of reproof, should allow other congregation members to interpret what type of sin had been committed.

Sex offenders may still be permitted to participate in the congregation's house-to-house preaching. According to the Watch Tower Society's spokesperson, J. R. Brown, such ones are only allowed to preach when accompanied by a responsible adult. In 2016, a convicted child sex offender was filmed going door-to-door for the denomination, accompanied by an adult partner. The sustained participation in the group's activities has resulted in sexual predators remaining in good standing in the congregation. Elders are instructed that if a child abuser moves from their congregation to another, they must send a letter to the body of elders in the new congregation outlining the offender's background, although these letters sometimes fail to mention these confessions of abuse.

== Comparison with other religions ==
The New York Times commented:

The shape of the scandal [in Jehovah's Witnesses] is far different than in the Catholic church, where most of the people accused of abuse are priests and a vast majority of the victims were boys and young men. In the Jehovah's Witnesses, where congregations are often collections of extended families and church elders are chosen from among the laypeople, some of those accused are elders, but most are congregation members. The victims who have stepped forward are mostly girls and young women, and many accusations involve incest.

In 2008, the Watch Tower Society of Britain, in discussions with the UK Charities Commission, undertook to produce a Child Protection Policy and update its procedures to bring them into line with other religious and secular bodies.

== Cover-up allegations ==
In some cases, members of Jehovah's Witnesses have been prevented or deterred from reporting child molestation to civil authorities. Particularly since around 2000, the Jehovah's Witnesses organization has been accused of covering up cases of child molestation committed by its members. In March 2001, Christianity Today printed an article reporting allegations that Jehovah's Witnesses' policies made reporting sexual abuse difficult for members, and did not conform to typical treatment of such cases. The article also included a response by representatives of Jehovah's Witnesses. The Australian Royal Commission heard that an elder discouraged an abuse victim from going to the Commission by saying, "Do you really want to drag Jehovah's name through the mud?" In Ireland in 2016, two Jehovah's Witness elders were removed from their positions as punishment for reporting a child molester to the police after the London Branch legal department told them not to.

The BBC reported allegations of a cover-up in July 2002, in an episode of Panorama entitled "Suffer the Little Children". The report revealed that the headquarters of Jehovah's Witnesses, the Watch Tower Society, requires all congregations to submit details of child abuse allegations and maintains an internal database on all cases of child abuse reported to them. It described one case where a child came forward to the elders of her congregation to report sexual abuse by her father but was sent home, despite their having known for three years that her father was an abuser. When the girl eventually went to the police, her father was convicted and sentenced to five years in prison.

According to Witness spokesman J. R. Brown, Jehovah's Witnesses are not required to report crimes to elders before calling civil authorities. Victims and their families are free to call police, he said, although some don't choose to. The Watch Tower Society maintains a policy with no explicit requirement for elders to report all child abuse cases where such is not required by law. Elders are instructed to "leave matters in Jehovah's hands" if an abuser denies the accusations and there is no second witness available.

In 2019, elders in New Zealand were told to destroy documents, causing survivors of child sex abuse to fear that cases will be covered up. The organization maintained that documents relevant to cases of abuse would not be destroyed.

=== 2014 investigations in the United Kingdom ===
In 2013 at the Jehovah's Witnesses congregation of Moston, Manchester, England, church elder and convicted child sex offender Jonathan Rose, following his completion of a nine-month jail sentence for paedophile offences, was allowed in a series of public meetings to cross-examine the children he had molested. Rose was disfellowshipped after complaints to the police and the Charity Commission for England and Wales.

In a separate incident, prior to the trial and conviction for rape and sexual assault in June 2014 of Mark Sewell, an elder of the congregation in Barry, Wales, the church conducted an internal investigation of the allegations, where the women and children had to face their alleged abuser in judicial committee hearings. A child victim, for whom Sewell was later convicted of rape, alleged that she was questioned closely by church elders when she came forward years after the attack and was required to describe the incident to them in intimate detail, with Sewell present, but her claims were dismissed by the committee and not taken to the police for further investigation. In June, Sewell was jailed for fourteen years for the rape and sexual abuse of parishioners, including children. All but one of Sewell's fellow elders who investigated claims against him declined to give evidence in his Crown Court trial. They also provided no assistance to police and prosecutors in their investigation, despite dis-fellowshipping Sewell 20 years previously, and destroyed evidence showing claims against Sewell dating back more than 20 years. In June 2014, Sewell was sentenced to fourteen years in prison for eight sex offenses; in December 2014 he appealed unsuccessfully for a reduction of his sentence.

In June and July 2014, the Charity Commission for England and Wales announced that it was formally investigating both the Moston and Barry congregations over their child protection policies, to be conducted independently of two statutory inquiries opened the previous month into Jehovah's Witnesses charities in relation to issues including child protection. The Charity Commission noted that it had "serious concerns" about the Manchester New Moston Congregation of Jehovah's Witnesses, having most recently opened a case into it in December 2013. The Watch Tower Society subsequently sought judicial review of the Charity Commission's enquiry; this was denied on 12 December 2014, on the grounds that the Charities Act 2011 required all other legal avenues to be exhausted prior to application for judicial review. Subsequent appeals against the investigation by the New Moston Congregation and the Watch Tower Bible and Tract Society of Britain to the Charity Commission's tribunal were rejected in April 2015.

In two separate cases in England in December 2014, a Jehovah's Witness in Bournemouth and a Jehovah's Witness elder from Plymouth were convicted and sentenced for the sexual abuse of children.

=== 2015 Australian royal commission ===
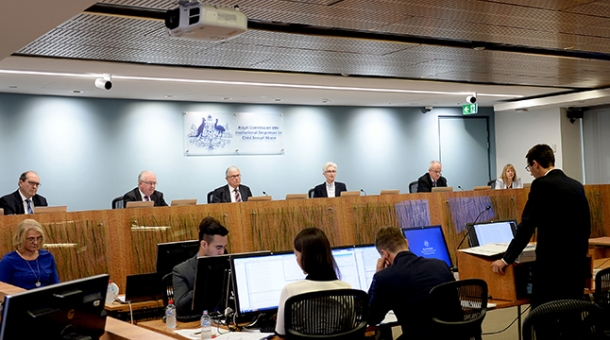
Case Study of Jehovah's Witnesses in Australia's Royal Commission into Institutional Responses to Child Sexual Abuse

The handling of child sexual abuse cases in Australia by Jehovah's Witnesses was examined by the Royal Commission into Institutional Responses to Child Sexual Abuse. The commission was established by the federal government in 2013 to investigate how institutions such as schools, churches, sports clubs and government organizations have responded to allegations and instances of child sexual abuse. Their "case studies showed that it was a common practice of religious institutions to adopt 'in-house' responses when dealing with allegations of child sexual abuse." In July and August 2015, it held a series of public hearings to present the accounts of two female sex abuse victims and also question seven elders and a circuit overseer associated with the congregations where the abuse took place. The commission also questioned two senior members of the Watch Tower Society Australian branch as well as Geoffrey Jackson, a member of the New York-based Governing Body.

The hearing was told that in response to a summons issued by the commission, the Watch Tower Society had produced 5,000 documents relating to 1,006 case files of allegations of child sexual abuse reported to Jehovah's Witness elders in Australia since 1950—each file for a different alleged perpetrator of child sexual abuse, including 579 cases in which the perpetrator confessed. The "case study regarding the Jehovah's Witnesses showed that the organisation dealt with allegations of child sexual abuse in accordance with internal, scripturally based disciplinary policies and procedures." The documents showed that of the alleged perpetrators, "not one was reported by the Church to secular authorities". The commission was told: "This suggests that it is the practice of the Jehovah's Witness Church to retain information regarding child sexual abuse offences but not to report allegations of child sexual abuse to the police or other relevant authorities." Officers of the Royal Commission "referred information in relation to 514 alleged perpetrators to police", adding that "of the remaining 492 alleged perpetrators identified in the case files, officers at the Royal Commission determined that there was either insufficient evidence in the case files to warrant referring matters to police or that the matters had already come to the attention of police".

An elder from the Australian branch office said that when not required by law to report abuse allegations to authorities, the church left the decision to report to authorities with the victim and his or her family. The commission found that the Watch Tower Society's legal department routinely provided incorrect information to elders based on an incorrect understanding of what constitutes a legal obligation to report crimes in Australia. In March 2017, the Royal Commission reported that since its initial 2015 investigation, the Watch Tower Society reported 15 of the 17 allegations it received from members to authorities, indicating that the remaining two were not reported at the request of adult survivors of historical abuse.

The Australian Royal Commission found that "We do not consider the Jehovah's Witness organisation to be an organisation which responds adequately to child sexual abuse. ... The organisation's retention and continued application of policies such as the two-witness rule in cases of child sexual abuse shows a serious lack of understanding of the nature of child sexual abuse." In its final report, the Royal Commission added, "As long as the Jehovah's Witness organisation continues to ... [rely on a literal interpretation of the Bible and 1st century principles to set practice, policy and procedure] ... in its response to allegations of child sexual abuse, it will remain an organisation that does not respond adequately to child sexual abuse and that fails to protect children."

=== New Zealand abuse allegations ===
In early June 2023, the Australasia branch of the Watch Tower Society filed for legal action for Jehovah's Witnesses to be exempted from the Royal Commission of Inquiry into Abuse in Care's investigation into sexual and other abuse by faith-based institutions. It argued that the denomination was not responsible, on the grounds that "the religion of Jehovah's Witnesses does not and never has taken children, young people or vulnerable adults into care". Survivors Network spokesperson Steve Goodlass expressed concern that other churches would use judicial reviews to avoid accountability for abuses. In mid-August 2023, Radio New Zealand said there were 11 active Jehovah's Witness members in New Zealand with child sex abuse convictions or serious allegations made against them. The Australasia branch office for Jehovah's Witnesses released a statement saying Jehovah's Witnesses abhor child abuse and that elders did not dissuade victims and their parents from reporting abuses to the authorities.

In late October 2023, the High Court in Wellington rejected the Australasian branch of the Jehovah's Witnesses' bid to be excluded from the Royal Commission's investigation.

== Lawsuits ==
=== Canada ===
In 2004, a Canadian court awarded CAD$5000 to a plaintiff for the negligence of an elder who failed to follow the official policy of the church. However, the court dismissed charges against the Watch Tower Society and directed the plaintiff to pay the Watch Tower Society's legal fees amounting to CAD$142,000.

On September 15, 2017, an application was filed in the Superior Court of Quebec for a class action lawsuit on behalf of victims of sexual abuse by a Jehovah's Witness in Quebec. Three corporations of Jehovah's Witnesses were named as defendants: The Watch Tower Bible and Tract Society of Canada, The Watch Tower Bible and Tract Society of Pennsylvania and The Watch Tower Bible and Tract Society of New York, Inc. In 2019, the Superior Court granted permission for the class action to proceed. Watchtower's request for appeal was granted by the Quebec Court of Appeal.

In 2017, it was also reported that a Calgary, Alberta law firm subsequently began an investigation for a national class action lawsuit against the Watchtower Bible and Tract Society of Canada for cases related to child sexual abuse. Subsequently, a nationwide class action lawsuit was filed in the Ontario Superior Court of Justice.

=== United Kingdom ===
In 2011, UK attorney Ann Olivarius and US lawyer Jeff Anderson, through their partnership with AO Advocates, brought the first successful civil claim in the UK against a ministerial servant of Jehovah's Witnesses for child abuse. In June 2015, the High Court of Justice in London awarded damages to the victim (a woman known as 'A') of £275,000 for the failure of Jehovah's Witnesses to protect her from a known pedophile, Peter Stewart. 'A' alleged Stewart abused her from the age of four and threatened that she would be "damned as a sinner" if she told anyone about the abuse. The elders became aware of the abuse in 1990 and announced that Stewart had been given a disciplinary reproof without specifying the reason. The abuse ended only when Stewart was arrested for offenses against another child in 1994. The court held that the elders failed to adequately warn the members of the congregation about their knowledge of past abuse by Stewart. The Watch Tower Bible and Tract Society of Britain sought several times to appeal against the judgement, but the Court of Appeal of England and Wales, holding "fair just and reasonable" to order the organization to pay the awarded damages, refused permission to appeal and upheld the ruling to pay to the victim £275,000 in compensation, in addition to the legal costs of the case, estimated at £1 million.

=== United States ===
In 2007 during a trial motion in the Napa, California court against the Watchtower Society, victims' lawyers convinced the court that 'ecclesiastical privilege' does not supersede the legal obligation of clergy to report child sex abuse to secular authorities. The Watchtower Society paid an undisclosed amount without admitting wrongdoing in an out-of-court settlement with 16 unnamed victims of alleged sexual abuse. According to court documents obtained by NBC News, one plaintiff was awarded over US$780,000. The Press-Enterprise newspaper reported in 2008 that subpoenaed elders declined to testify against accused penitents, citing the confidentiality of penitent-clergy privilege. However, the elders did not object to testifying once the court found that "the privilege of penitential communication did not apply".

In June 2012 the Superior Court of Alameda, California, ordered the Watchtower Society to pay US$21 million in punitive damages, in addition to compensatory damages, holding that the Society's policy to not disclose the child abuse history of a member to parents in the congregation or report abuse to authorities contributed to the sexual abuse of a nine-year-old girl. The court held that congregation elders, following the policies of the Watchtower Bible and Tract Society, contributed to the abuse. It held that the elders as agents of the Watchtower Society failed to disclose to other parents regarding the confession of the molester who inappropriately touched his step-daughter, adding that the degree of reprehensibility was of "medium range". Based on the ratio between the compensatory and punitive damages, the court subsequently reduced the Watchtower Society's total liability to US$10 million, Lawyers for the Society appealed the ruling, calling the decision "unprecedented" and denying responsibility for abuse. In April 2015, the appeal court reversed the punitive damages, finding that the congregation had no duty to warn the parents or members about the history of offences committed by other members. However, the court concluded that the Watchtower Society was negligent in preventing the abuse and upheld the trial court's decision on compensatory damages amounting to US$2.8 million to be paid by the Watchtower Society and the congregation. The Watchtower Society appealed against the negligence verdict to the Supreme Court of California and the case was settled for an undisclosed amount during appeal.

In October 2014, a case was heard in San Diego, California, about the sexual abuse of Jose Lopez by Gonzalo Campos. Witness elders were aware that Campos had confessed to the abuse of at least one other child in 1982, but in 1986 they recommended Campos as an instructor to Lopez. Campos moved to another congregation in 1987 and became an elder in 1993. Campos later confessed to abusing at least eight children between 1982 and 1995 and subsequently fled to Mexico. Campos was subsequently disfellowshipped in 1995. For failing to protect Lopez from a known offender and for its subsequent refusal to cooperate with the court, the Watchtower Society was ordered to pay US$13.5 million to the plaintiff. The Watchtower Society appealed the ruling. The appeal court vacated the judgment, granting that lesser sanctions might compel the Watchtower Society to comply with the court's requirements. While the document discovery dispute was still in progress the case was settled out of court in January 2018. In a separate case involving another victim of Gonzalo Campos, the Watchtower Society produced redacted copies of documents related to child sexual abuse in the United States from 1997 until 2001. The Watchtower Society asserted that it had no access to more recent documents held by the Christian Congregation of Jehovah's Witnesses, a separate subsidiary of the Watchtower Society. The court sanctioned Watchtower $4,000 for each day that it did not submit the documents. Watchtower unsuccessfully appealed against the ruling, and the court of appeals directed Watchtower to pay fines (US$48,000 by the time of the appeal) and submit to the court order. The case was settled out of court in February 2018. In 2015, another California trial court defaulted Watchtower and ordered it to pay US$4 million to the plaintiff after its failure to produce documents. Watchtower subsequently offered to produce documents on a rollout basis and appealed the decision to California appellate courts, but lost the appeal. Watchtower's further appeal to the United States Supreme Court was denied in October 2019. In 2014, it was reported that the law firm representing these lawsuits filed similar cases in Connecticut, Vermont, California, Oregon and New Mexico.

In 2016, the Delaware attorney general sued Watchtower claiming that elders failed to report an unlawful sexual relationship between a 35-year-old woman and a 14-year-old boy, both of whom were disfellowshipped by elders. The court ruled that while communication between the adult perpetrator and elders was protected by penitent-clergy privilege, the communication with the minor was not. Watchtower reached a settlement with the state, paying $19,500 in fines without admitting guilt or liability. The elders were to participate in a training program provided by the State of Delaware.

In 2018, a jury in Thompson Falls, Montana, awarded $35 million to a victim of sexual abuse, claiming that the Jehovah's Witnesses church failed to protect her. The case was reportedly focused on the 'two witness rule' and the failure of congregation elders to turn the information over to secular authorities. The Watchtower Society argued that elders had no legal obligation to report abuse cases in Montana and appealed the ruling. In January 2020, the Supreme Court of Montana reversed and remanded the judgement in favor of Jehovah's Witnesses holding that the confidential communication elders received is specifically exempt under mandatory reporting statute.

In July 2023, a circuit court in Hawaii awarded $40 million in damages to a plaintiff identified as "N.D.", based on allegations that she was raped and sexually assaulted by Keneth L. Apana, a church elder when she was 12 years old in 1992. The process, initiated in 2020, that indicted Apana and the Makaha Congregation of Jehovah's Witnesses, as well as other entities associated with the Jehovah's Witnesses church, also found that Apana abused other girls for 23 years. Apana admitted to many of the facts alleged by the plaintiff. The Jehovah's Witnesses part of the case was settled before the $40 million judgment against the perpetrator.

== See also ==
- Criticism of Jehovah's Witnesses
- Scouting sex abuse cases
- Sexual abuse cases in Southern Baptist churches
- Silentlambs
