= Jayaben Desai =

British trade unionist (1933–2010)

- Born: 2 April 1933; Gujarat, India
- Died: 23 December 2010 (aged 77)
- Known for: Trade unionism
- Spouse: Suryakant

Jayaben Desai (2 April 1933 – 23 December 2010) was an Indian-born trade unionist in the United Kingdom. She was noted as a prominent leader of the strikers in the Grunwick dispute in London in 1976.

== Early life ==
Born in Dharmaj, Gujarat, India, Desai moved to Tanzania, East Africa, in 1956. At the age of 22, she married Suryakant, a factory owner. The couple were from middle-class mercantile backgrounds. They moved to Britain in 1967, before the Commonwealth Immigrants Act 1968 made it harder for British passport holders from former British colonies to enter the country.

== Grunwick dispute ==
In Britain, Desai had to take up low-paid work, first as a sewing machinist, then processing film in the Grunwick factory. She resigned after being ordered to work overtime at short notice, and instigated a strike among the mainly Asian and female workforce. The strikers protested about working conditions, pay inequality and institutionalised racism within the company. Women were even asked why they needed to go to the toilet, and Desai counselled her colleagues not to be intimidated by this. Her words to the manager on resignation were: "What you are running here is not a factory, it is a zoo. In a zoo, there are many types of animals. Some are monkeys who dance on your fingertips, others are lions who can bite your head off. We are those lions, Mr Manager."

Desai led the strikers in their two-year picket from 1976 to 1978. The strike was backed by the Association of Professional, Executive, Clerical and Computer Staff (APEX Union), who also produced a strike bulletin. The local Union of Post Office Workers (UPW) branch refused to deliver the Grunwick photography laboratory post, until challenged with the support of the Conservative Party, at that time the government Opposition.

Desai was an inspiring speaker and well-known speaker, speaking out against racist and sexist comments aimed at her and at the other striking workers, and criticising what she felt was a lack of support from the Trades Union Congress for her cause. She said: "Trade union support is like honey on the elbow – you can smell it, you can feel it, but you cannot taste it."

In November 1977, Desai went on hunger strike with fellow strikers Vipin Magdani, Johnny Patel and Yasu Patel.

The prime minister Jim Callaghan appointed a judge, Lord Justice Scarman to settle the dispute. Desai testified at length. Judge Scarman recommended that the union should be recognised and the sacked workers reinstated. The factory owner ignored the report and the unions backed off, leaving the Grunwick strike committee to announce the strike was over on 14 July 1978.

== After the strike ==
Desai returned to the sewing industry and later became a teacher at Harrow College. She passed her driving test at the age of 60 and encouraged other women to do so to increase their freedom.

Mrs Desai (as she was always referred to) recorded her thoughts for the Brent Museum and archives. In an interview by Hannah Phung of Brent Museum she said: "It was amazing, let me tell you, it was amazing.[…] tears were in my eyes to see these people […] they were hurting themselves and the police were charging them with horses and everything and still they were standing strong."

Jayaben Desai died on 23 December 2010. Her family scattered her ashes near the sources of the Indus and Ganges rivers and in Rotherhithe on the Thames.

== Commemoration ==
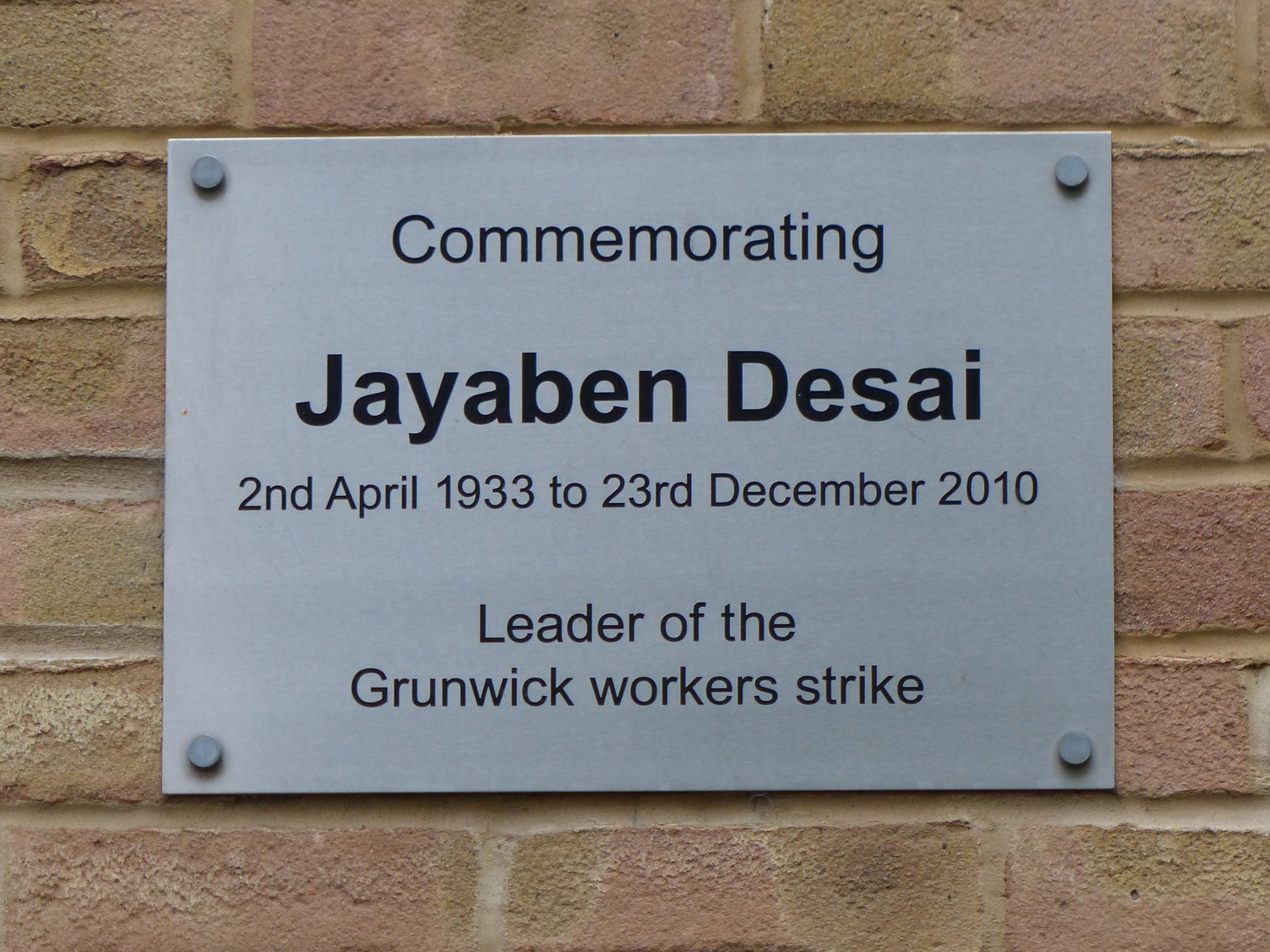
Plaque commemorating Jayaben Desai

On 14 December 2016 Desai was named as one of seven women chosen by BBC Radio Four's Woman's Hour for their 2016 Power List, which was topped by Margaret Thatcher and also included Helen Brook, Barbara Castle, Germaine Greer, Bridget Jones and Beyoncé.

A portrait of Desai by David Mansell was purchased by the National Portrait Gallery, London in 2017. Also in 2017, a new play about Desai and the strikers, We Are The Lions Mr Manager by Neil Gore, was performed by Townsend Theatre Productions.

A comic strip about Desai was created by Dr Sundari Anitha (University of Lincoln) and Professor Ruth Pearson (University of Leeds).

In 2021, a British Indian Film-maker created a short documentary in tribute to Desai and the 1976 The Grunwick Strike. Documentary is on YouTube named Strikers in Saris released on 7 February 2021.

== Sources and further reading ==
- Wilmer, Val, "The first preference is pride" (interview with Jayaben Desai), Time Out, 15–21 September 1978, pp. 14–15.
