= Teenage pregnancy in the United Kingdom =

Teenage conception rate in England and Wales over time

Teenage pregnancy in the United Kingdom refers to the rate at which people under 20 fall pregnant in the United Kingdom. As of 2021, the rate of teenage conceptions in the United Kingdom was 5.226% percent of total conceptions, whereas 2.199% of all live births in the United Kingdom were to mothers under 20 years of age. The rate of teenage pregnancy is relatively high when compared with other developed countries; the only other Western countries with higher teenage pregnancy rates are the United States and New Zealand. However, rates have rapidly decreased since then. A report in 2002 found that around half of all conceptions to under-18s were concentrated among the 30% most economically deprived population, with only 14% occurring among the 30% least deprived.

The 2008 underage conception rate in England and Wales was 13% lower than in 1998. Over 60% of the conceptions led to a legal abortion, the highest proportion since conception statistics began in 1969. Other studies have shown similar findings.

== Comparative pregnancy rate ==
The Labour government elected in 1997 pledged to halve the number of conceptions to girls under 18 by 2010, but by 2008 the drop was only 13%, a level the Secretary of State for Children Ed Balls called 'disappointing', dropping by 9.5% from 2009 to 2010 despite an overall increase in fertility. By 2014, the under-18 conception rate in England had dropped to 22.9 per 1,000, approximately half the 1997 figure of 45.9.

=== Change in pregnancy rate over time ===
Births to many teenagers increased during the 1960s and peaked in 1971 at 50.6 per thousand of the population. After 1971, they gradually fell to their lowest level since the mid-1950s. The proportion occurring outside marriage increased from around one-in-six in the 1950s to about nine-in-ten in 2006. The abortion rate in England and Wales in 2015 was 9.9 per 1,000 women under 18, down from 17.8 in 2005.

=== Geographic variation in pregnancy rate ===
High teenage pregnancy rates are found in areas with low GCSE examination success, such as Nottingham, Kingston upon Hull, Doncaster, Barnsley, Middlesbrough, Manchester (highest), Nuneaton, Sandwell, Bristol, Stoke on Trent, Bradford, North East Lincolnshire, and Blackpool. In 1997, a study revealed that there was a north–south divide in England in the rate of conceptions to under-18s, with the highest rates and proportion leading to maternity being in the north, and the lowest rates with the highest proportion leading to abortion, being in the south, with the exception of London, which had high rates of both conception and abortion.

== Pregnancies ==
=== Abortions ===
1967: Abortion was legalised in England, Wales and Scotland under the Abortion Act. The first legal abortions were performed on 27 April 1968.

1969: Over 9,500 teenage girls (over 1,200 being under 16) opted for an abortion in England, Wales & Scotland in the first full year of legal abortion, (almost one in five of all abortions) the majority of whom were single. A survey of women seeking an abortion by the British Pregnancy Advisory Service revealed that almost two-fifths of parents of single, pregnant, teenage girls were unaware of their daughters' pregnancy, the majority of these being to teenagers who were not living at home.

1982: In a court ruling, a pregnant fifteen-year-old girl who had been pregnant once before was allowed to have an abortion against the wishes of her father, who did not want her to have one on religious and moral grounds. This is believed to be the first known case in Britain where an under-age girl was able to obtain a legal abortion without the consent of her parent/s.

2006: Mother of two teenage daughters Sue Axon lost her battle in the high court to try and prevent under-age girls from seeking an abortion without their parents' permission. Figures revealed that there were 4,352 abortions in Britain to under-16s, up five percent on 2005.

2008: The number of girls under 16 having an abortion reached a record level of 4,376 girls (4.4 per thousand of the population) in England and Wales during 2007. The number and rate fell slightly in 2008. 2007 statistics showed that the younger the age of the women at abortion the more likely it was to be in the second trimester. Seventeen per cent of abortions to girls aged under 14 were over twelve weeks gestation compared to almost 9% for women aged over 34. Statistics from the Department Of Health for the three-year period 2006 to 2008 showed that the area with the highest rate of abortion in girls under 16 in England and Wales was in the Southwark Primary Care Organisation (PCO) at a rate of 9.2 per 1000 girls in the population aged 13–15. Approximately seven-out-of-ten of the areas with the highest rate were in London. Outside London, the PCOs with the highest rates were Darlington (8.0), Manchester (7.3) and Hartlepool (7.2). The rate for the whole of England & Wales was 4.1.

=== Births ===
1951: Throughout the 1940s, the teenage birth rate rose from 15.0 in every thousand in 1941 to 21.3. At the end of the Second World War, the proportion of teenage births born outside marriage had almost doubled from the beginning of the decade to a third. By 1951, the proportion had dropped to 16% and remained largely unchanged throughout the decade. There were around one-in-six pregnant brides during the decade, the proportion being even higher for teenagers, with one-in-four being pregnant on their wedding day.

During the 1950s, illegitimate teenage births made up just a small proportion of all illegitimate births, at just under 15%, with over half of all illegitimate births being to women over the age of 25.

1959: By the end of the 1950s, the number of teenage births had risen nearly 50%, from 33,000 in 1955 to 46,000, a rate of 31.6 per thousand. The number of births to girls under 16 remained constant during the late-1940s and early half of the 1950s. From 1955 to the end of the 1950s, the number of under-16s giving birth more than doubled.

1964: The number of births to women of all ages had risen 11% since 1960 to a post-World War II high of almost 900,000. In the same period, there was an increase of almost 49% to 76,000 (43 per thousand) among teenagers. The number of teenage brides marrying for the first time topped 100,000; the proportion of them pregnant on their wedding day had increased from 25% during the 1950s to almost 40%, more than double the proportion of women in their twenties. The proportion of teenage births outside marriage had risen to almost 25%; the most marked increase was in the number of girls under 16 giving birth, with an almost 50% increase between 1959 and 1960 alone. The number of births to girls under 16 had increased by 125% since 1959.

1966: A Home Office survey on adoption revealed that the natural mother in over half of all illegitimate non-parental adoptions during the year was under the age of 21. There were almost 18,000 illegitimate adoptions during the year, with 14,000 being adopted by someone other than the parent(s).

1969: Even though the birth rate to women of all ages was in decline, having peaked in 1964, the teenage birth rate continued to rise, to a rate of 49.6 per thousand girls.

1971: Research revealed that illegitimate teenage births were more likely in women from a manual social class background than a non-manual social class background, and that over half of women having an illegitimate birth before the age of 18 would go on to have a legitimate birth before the age of 25, compared to only a third for women who did not have an illegitimate birth in their teens.

1973: Although the overall teenage birth rate for England and Wales had peaked in 1971, the number born to under-16s had continued to rise, to over 1,700. This was a 55% increase since 1964, and a 250% increase since 1959.

1974: The number of girls under 16 in Scotland giving birth reached 148, up 39% since 1967. The number of abortions occurring to the same age group reached over 200 per year.

1975: With the legalisation of abortion and better availability of contraception, the number of pregnant teenage brides had declined by 37% since 1970. The teenage birth rate also declined to a rate of 36.4 in 1975. However, the proportion of teenage births occurring outside marriage continued to rise to almost one-in-three.

1976: The proportion of all illegitimate births occurring to teenagers had more than doubled since the 1950s, from 15% to 37%, whilst the proportion occurring to women over the age of 25 had fallen from 56% to 32% in the same period. However, the proportion of births occurring outside marriage to women of all ages was still only 9%.

With the legalisation of abortion came a drop in the number of illegitimate children being adopted, from a peak of over 19,000 in 1968 down to almost 9,000. In addition, the number of mother and baby homes had declined by nearly 72% since 1966. Much of this was due to the decline in the stigma attached to having a baby outside marriage and an increase in cohabitation among unmarried couples. There was also an increase in the number of never-married lone mothers, rising 44% since 1971, with half of all never-married lone mothers being under the age of 25.

1981: The number of under-16s giving birth fell to the lowest level since 1965.

1983: The number of births to teenagers had fallen by about a third since 1971 to over 54,000, a rate of almost 27 in every thousand. The proportion occurring outside marriage had risen to 56%.

1986: The proportion of teenage women who were married had fallen from a peak of 11% in 1973 to just over 3%. The number of births to teenagers began to increase, with the proportion of teenage births outside marriage continuing to increase to 69%; in almost one-third of cases, both parents were living at the same address at the time of the birth.

1990: The number of under-16s giving birth had risen 10% since 1981.

1996: The number of births to all teenagers continued to fall, from 54,000 in 1983 to almost 45,000, a rate of almost 30 per thousand. The proportion occurring outside marriage was almost 89%, compared to 36% for women of all ages. However, the number of births occurring to under 16s in England and Wales increased to over 1,600, the highest level since the early-1970s, with another 160 in Scotland.

Under-16 birth rates (per 1000 aged 13–15) in the 4 countries of the United Kingdom
Year	England	Wales	Scotland	N. Ireland
1997	1.7	2.3	1.9	1.0
2002	1.3	1.7	1.2	0.9
2006	1.2	1.4	1.2	0.9
2007	1.1	1.3	1.2	1.0

2001: The Census showed that half of all teenagers with children were lone parents, 40% were cohabiting as a couple, and 10% were married.

2005: There were about 45,000 teenage births, with 92% being outside marriage. Almost 74% of the births outside marriage were jointly registered to both parents. Over half of these were residing at the same address at the time of the birth. The teenage birth rate of 26.3.

The number of teenage births in Scotland had fallen from about 5,500 (28.3 per thousand) in 1991 to about 4,100, a rate of 25.8 per thousand, with 97% occurring outside marriage.

2008: The number of births to girls under 20 in England and Wales was 44,690, a provisional rate of 26.2 per thousand teenage women in the population. Despite much media attention and public anger over the UK's high number of teenage mothers, the rate of births to teenagers was actually at its lowest level since the mid-1950s.

=== Trends in teenage pregnancy ===
The verified statistics presented here use the age of a girl at the outcome of her pregnancy (either birth or abortion). These differ a lot from widely quoted ones used by the UK government to track the teenage pregnancy rate, which use the age of the girl at conception, unlike pregnancy statistics in other countries. Using pregnancy statistics by age of girl at the outcome of her pregnancy allows more meaningful comparison with other countries.

Teenage births in England and Wales (numbers & rates)
Year	Under 20			Under 16	
Year	Numbers	Rate per 1000 women aged 15–19	% Outside Marriage	Numbers	Rate per 1000 women aged 13–15
1955	33,000	23.5	16.7	200	0.3
1959	46,000	31.6	17.2	500	0.5
1964	76,000	42.5	22.5	1,100	1.1
1969	82,000	49.6	26.3	1,500	1.6
1971	83,000	50.6	25.8	1,500	1.5
1973	73,000	43.9	28.0	1,700	1.6
1981	57,000	28.1	46.5	1,200	1.0
1983	54,000	26.9	56.1	1,300	1.1
1990	56,000	33.3	80.3	1,300	1.5
1996	45,000	29.7	88.0	1,600	1.8
2006	45,500	26.6	93.0	1,200	1.2
2007	44,800	26.0	93.1	1,100	1.2
2008	44,700	26.0	93.9	1,200	1.3
2009	43,200	25.3	94.6	1,000	1.1

Teenage abortions to residents of England & Wales (numbers & rates)

Year	Under 20		Under 16	
Year	Numbers	Rate per 1000 women aged 15–19	Numbers	Rate per 1000 women aged 13–15
1969	9,200	5.6	1,200	1.2
1971	20,500	12.5	2,300	2.3
1976	27,400	15.2	3,400	3.0
1981	34,900	17.3	3,500	3.0
1984	37,500	19.0	4,200	3.7
1986	37,700	19.8	3,900	3.7
1990	38,900	23.4	3,400	4.0
1994	28,500	19.6	3,200	3.5
1998	37,000	23.7	3,800	4.0
2001	37,000	23.5	3,700	3.7
2006	41,300	24.1	4,000	3.9
2007	44,000	25.5	4,400	4.4
2008	42,700	25.0	4,100	4.3
2009	40,100	23.8	3,800	4.0

Live Birth rates in England and Wales
Year	Rate per 1000 women under 20
2006	26.6
2007	25.9
2008	25.7
2009	24.8
2010	23.4
2011	21.3
2012	19.9
2013	17.4
2014	15.6
2015	14.5

== See also ==
- Abortion in the United Kingdom
- Adolescent sexuality in the United Kingdom
- Age-of-consent reform in the United Kingdom
- Prevalence of teenage pregnancy, globally.
- British Pregnancy Advisory Service
