= Helen Brook =

British advocate of birth control (1907–1997)

Helen Brook CBE
- Born: Helen Grace Knewstub; 12 October 1907; Chelsea, London, England
- Died: 3 October 1997 (aged 89)
- Occupation: Advocate of birth control
- Known for: Founder of Brook Advisory Centres
- Spouse(s): George Whitaker (m. 1926; dissolved 1928) Robin Brook (m. 1937)
- Children: 3

Helen Brook, CBE (born Helen Grace Mary Knewstub; 12 October 1907 – 3 October 1997) was a British family planning adviser who in 1964 founded the Brook Advisory Centres with the primary aim of reducing the number of illegal abortions and "to inculcate a sense of sexual responsibility in the young". She was appointed CBE in 1995. On 14 December 2016, she was named as one of seven women chosen by BBC Radio Four's Woman's Hour for their 2016 Power List of women deemed to have had the greatest influence on women's lives over the past 70 years.

== Biography ==
Born Helen Grace Knewstub in Chelsea, London, in 1907, one of six children, she was educated at the Convent of the Holy Child Jesus at Mark Cross, Sussex. At the age of 17, she married George Whitaker, leader of the Chenil Chamber Orchestra, giving birth to a daughter the following year; the marriage was dissolved at her request after two years and she then spent two years in Paris as a painter. Having returned to London, in 1937 she married banker Robin Brook and they had two daughters.

Helen Brook worked as a volunteer for the Family Planning Association (FPA). As Ann Furedi wrote in The Independent,

"Brook was motivated by fervent belief that children should be born to mothers who wanted them and could care for them. She also believed that women should enjoy equality with men and that to achieve this they needed to be able to avoid unwanted pregnancy.... In 1958, when Marie Stopes died, Brook was invited to run her independent clinic in Whitfield Street in London, and with the support of the clinic doctors and a nurse she began to run an evening session each week for the large numbers of unmarried women turned away from other clinics. In 1963, she began 'secret' sessions aimed specifically at young people. When, at the end of that year, a storm of publicity broke, the Marie Stopes board suggested it would be expedient if she founded a separate centre. The opportunity was duly seized and the first of the Brook Advisory Centres exclusively for young, unmarried people opened its doors in London to women and men in 1964."

On 16 February 1980, Brook wrote a letter to The Times in which she stated:

"[T]here are countless men and women, parents, who are too selfish, too ignorant, too lazy to be bothered about their children's general education. From birth till death it is now the privilege of the parental State to take major decisions— objective, unemotional, the State weighs up what is best for the child."

John Stokes described the letter in Parliament as "notorious" and "a terrifying doctrine, the end of which one dare not see."

Brook was vice-president of the national council of the FPA from 1987. In later life, she lost her sight, and she died as the result of a stroke on 3 October 1997, survived by her husband.

== Honours and legacy ==
In the 1995 Birthday Honours, Brook was appointed a Commander of the Order of the British Empire (CBE) for services to Family Planning. She was named on the BBC Radio Four Woman's Hour 2016 Power List that celebrated the seven women who have had the biggest impact on women's lives over the past seven decades (the others being Margaret Thatcher, Germaine Greer, Jayaben Desai, Barbara Castle, Bridget Jones and Beyoncé).
