= Brook Advisory Centres =

Set up by Lady Helen Brook in 1964

Brook Advisory Centres were set up by Lady Helen Brook in 1964 offering contraceptive advice to young single people under the age of 25.

Brook was asked in 1958 by the Eugenics Society to run the birth control clinic they had just been bequeathed by Marie Stopes. This clinic, unlike the Family Planning Association where Brook had previously worked, was not required to confine its service to married women or women who could prove that they were very shortly to be married. The work of the Centres was facilitated by the National Health Service (Family Planning) Act 1967.

Brook, who had worked as a volunteer for the Family Planning Association, was Chairman of the organisation from 1964 to 1974 and President 1974–97. Until her death in 1997, despite severe eye problems in later life she retained a keen interest in, and supported, the activities of the centres that bear her name.

By 1969 the Centres were offering contraceptive advice to more than ten thousand unmarried people under 25, the majority were aged between 19 and 21 with around one in six being under 19. By 1997 there were 18 branches, funded by local health authorities.

Brook established solid relationships with central and local government authorities; the Guest of Honour at its 25th anniversary in 1989 was the Princess Royal.

The organisation changed its name to Brook.

== See also ==
- Teenage pregnancy and sexual health in the United Kingdom
