= Tackling Violent Crime Act =

Parliament of Canada
- Long title: An Act to amend the Criminal Code and to make consequential amendments to other Acts
- Citation: S.C. 2008, c. 6
- Royal assent: February 28, 2008
- Status: Current legislation

The Tackling Violent Crime Act (French: Loi sur la lutte contre les crimes violents) is an omnibus statute that was given royal assent on February 28, 2008. The statute primarily deals with strengthening gun control in Canada as well as fighting drunk driving, drug-impaired driving and to increase the age of consent for sexual intercourse from 14 to 16.
