= Child Welfare League of Canada =

Membership organization

- Abbreviation: CWLC
- Formation: 1994
- Type: NGO
- Location: Canada
- Key people: Tanya Ironstone Locke (Executive Director)
- Website: www.cwlc.ca

The Child Welfare League of Canada, also referred to as Ligue pour le bien-être de l'enfance du Canada, is a national, membership-based organization dedicated to promoting the safety and well-being of children and their families, especially those who are vulnerable or marginalized. The League aspires for all children to thrive, to know that they are loved, and to have a sense of belonging.

Established in 1994, the League is a national, membership-based charitable organization dedicated to promoting the safety and well-being of young people and their families, especially those who are vulnerable and marginalized.

== Organization and structure ==
The Child Welfare League of Canada is a national organization with membership in all provinces and territories, including representation at the federal level. Member organizations include provincial/territorial ministries of child and family services, child and family service agencies, Indigenous organizations, health and social services, youth services and federal government departments.

Membership and the services of the Child Welfare League of Canada are open and accessible to organizations and persons of all cultures, ethnic origins and social classes. The organization provides services, publications and information in both of Canada's official languages.

== History ==
Many years before the Child Welfare League of Canada was founded, Canadians working in the field of child and youth services were active in the Child Welfare League of America, the oldest and largest North American organization devoted to the well-being of children. Canadian agencies and government departments have been members of the Child Welfare League of America since the late 1920s.

In the mid-1980s, a number of Canadian members asked the Child Welfare League of America to provide stronger membership services in Canada, and as a result, they hired a Canadian consultant to provide membership support and to conduct a needs assessment.

Two priorities emerged: first, the need for a Canadian public policy symposium and, second, the need to explore the potential for a stronger, more permanent presence in Canada, possibly with a Canadian office.

Working in partnership with the Canadian Council on Children and Youth and the Canadian Child Welfare Association, Canadian members of the Child Welfare League of America hosted a major public policy symposium on children's issues. The Child Welfare League of America provided the secretariat function and seed funding during the planning phase and coordinated the symposium, called "Canada's Children: The Priority for the '90s", which was held in Ottawa in October 1991.

The symposium was a catalyst for more action at the national level through continuing alliances and follow-up with federal politicians and the Federation of Canadian Municipalities. As a result of the conference, several provincial coalitions developed, which today continue to work on behalf of children and youth.

A Canadian office of the Child Welfare League of America opened in Ottawa in January 1992. It was able to respond to the need for a stronger emphasis on public policy and advocacy – functions that could not be handled by a headquarters in the U.S.

In May 1992, Canada members set up a National Steering Committee, chaired by Monsignor William Irwin of Edmonton Catholic Social Services, to shape a Canadian organization. The goal was to provide member support not available from existing Canadian organizations and to work with other organizations to prevent duplication of effort.

The National Steering Committee recommended the establishment of the Child Welfare League of Canada, which would continue its affiliation with its American counterpart to ensure Canadian members had access to certain services and publications. The American organization agreed to provide financial support for the Canadian organization for three years. The Child Welfare League of Canada was incorporated on April 21, 1994.

From 2000 to 2013, the organization established and presented an annual Child Welfare League of Canada Achievement Award.

In 2004, the Child Welfare League of Canada supported the anti-spanking campaign launched by the Canadian Foundation for Children, Youth and the Law v Canada (AG).

In 2014, the organization published a report on the state of foster care in Canada.

In April 2019, the League celebrated 25 years of promoting the safety and well-being of young people and their families.

In 2019, the organization created and launched a Learning Community on Reconciliation. The Community is composed of over 30 organizations from coast to coast, with a cross-cutting focus in child welfare, housing, health and youth justice. First convened in October 2019, the Community is rallying with the understanding that implementation of the Truth and Reconciliation Commission's (TRC's) Calls to Action is happening at a slow pace. If reconciliation in Canada is to advance, non-Indigenous people must make strides in contributing meaningful work. With this purpose in mind, the League's initiative is creating opportunities for mainstream child, youth and family serving organizations to:

1. Strengthen their ability to work creatively, respectfully and collaboratively with First Nations, Inuit, and Métis peoples.
2. Reflect on their practice, learn from peers and experts, and prototype and evaluate reconciliation initiatives.
3. Operationalize the TRC's Calls to Action and the United Nations Declaration on the Rights of Indigenous Peoples (UNDRIP) in their organization.

In 2020, the League actively supported a moratorium on youth in care aging out of support services during the COVID-19 pandemic.

Working alongside McGill University's Centre for Research on Children and Families, the Canadian Foster Families Association and Youth in Care Canada, the League planned the Close Ties conference (originally slated for June 2020 in Montreal). Cutting across CWLC's top three strategic priorities, the multi-day event was set to profile initiatives that help children and youth in care to thrive, through a focus on significant relationships and a sense of belonging to family, community and culture. The programming centred on marginalized populations, including First Nations, Inuit and Métis children and families, migrant children, 2SLGBTQ+ youth, children with disabilities and youth transitioning out of care. The event was cancelled due to the COVID-19 pandemic. In lieu of an in-person gathering, the organizing team has developed an online learning program, launching in September 2020. The eight-month program will provide a meaningful lens into the Close Ties conference content, delivered via an inspiring series of webinar presentations and journal publications. The League is also planning to make a version of the youth program available for youth in care networks in Canada in 2021.

The League also supports anti-poverty initiatives.
