= The Hepatitis C Trust =

British health charity

The Hepatitis C Trust is a registered charity in England and Scotland that campaigns on various issues related to hepatitis C. In particular, the charity aims to increase awareness and testing; to provide services on a national and local level to people with, affected by, or at risk of contracting hepatitis C; and to campaign for greater public understanding of the impact of hepatitis C. It is the only national hepatitis C-specific charity in the UK and has offices in London and Edinburgh.

== History ==
Formed in 2001 by Charles Gore, the trust was the first charity in the UK to be set up in response to hepatitis C. He had contracted the virus himself and was moved to act as a result of the general lack of information and apathy he encountered during his own eventual diagnosis and treatment. Gore is also the founder of the World Hepatitis Alliance, organiser of World Hepatitis Day on 28 July each year.

Until her death in 2007, The Body Shop founder Anita Roddick was a patron and supporter of the trust. Roddick was convinced she had contracted hepatitis C through contaminated blood from a large blood transfusion in 1971 after the birth of her younger daughter, more than 30 years before she was diagnosed.

The trust currently provides the secretariat of the All Party Parliamentary Hepatology Group, consults with the National Institute for Clinical Excellence (NICE) and the Department of Health, UK, is a founder member of the European Liver Patients' Association (ELPA) and the International Alliance of Patient's Organizations (IAPO) and plays a lead role in the organisation of World Hepatitis Day in the UK.
