= ELPA =

ELPA or elpa may refer to:

== Organisations ==
- Elliniki Leschi Periigiseon kai Aftokinitou, the Automobile and Touring Club of Greece
  - ELPA Rally, a former rally competition in Greece
- European Liver Patients Association, founded by The Hepatitis C Trust
- European Law & Policy Advisory Group; See Ernest Valko

== Other uses ==
- Emacs Lisp Package Archive, for GNU Emacs

== See also ==
- 3. elpa, an album by Gustavo
- English Language Proficiency Assessment for the 21st Century (ELPA21), part of CRESST at UCLA
