= Sam Roddick =

English business executive (born 1971)

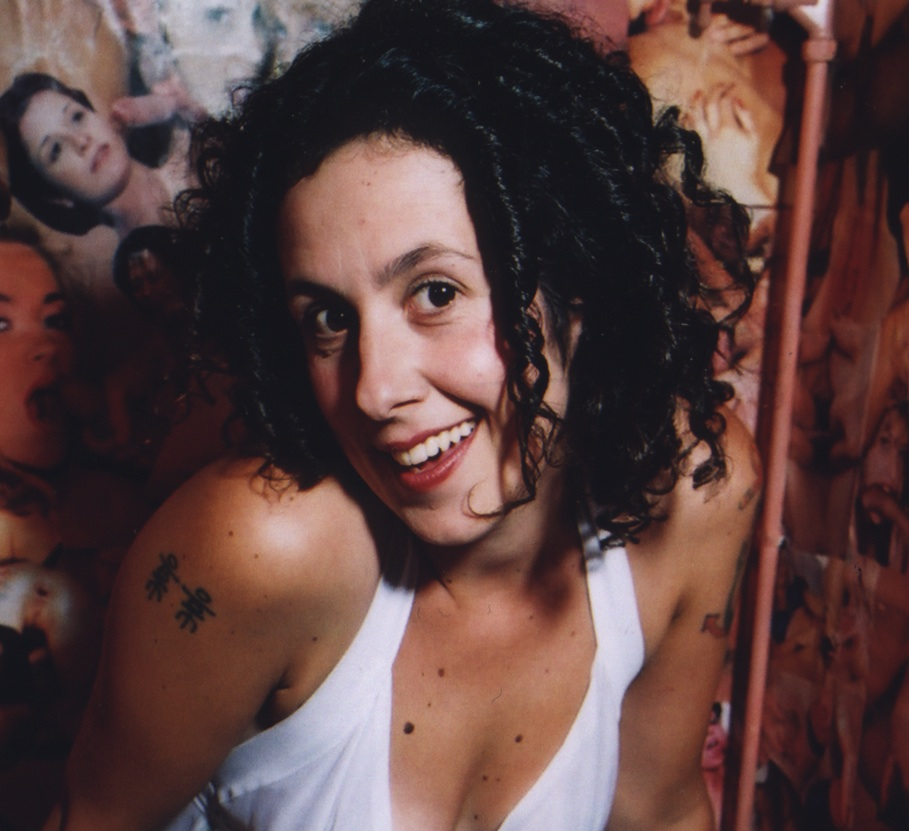
- Roddick in 2008
- Born: 1 July 1971 (age 55); Rustington, Sussex, England
- Occupation: Entrepreneur
- Known for: Businesswoman, founder of Coco de Mer, and Bondage For Freedom
- Children: Osha, daughter
- Parent(s): Gordon Roddick; Anita Roddick
- Website: coco-de-mer.com

Samantha Roddick (born 1 July 1971) is an English business executive who is the founder of Coco de Mer, a British lingerie brand and retail store. She is the daughter of Body Shop founder and activist Anita Roddick.

== Early life and education ==
Roddick is the younger daughter of Anita and Gordon Roddick. She was educated at Summerlea Primary School and then at Frensham Heights in Surrey until she was asked to leave at age 16. She gained only two O-Levels due to having undiagnosed dyslexia. On leaving Frensham, the mother of a schoolmate suggested she work with her in Nepal, which is where her activism began.

=== Early activism ===
Roddick's early activism included talks, fundraisers and projects worldwide. In addition, she set up Cockroach, a youth magazine; and taught art in Vancouver. Roddick backed the Women's Equality Party's campaign to encourage women to vote in the UK's 2016 referendum on its membership of the EU.

== Coco de Mer ==
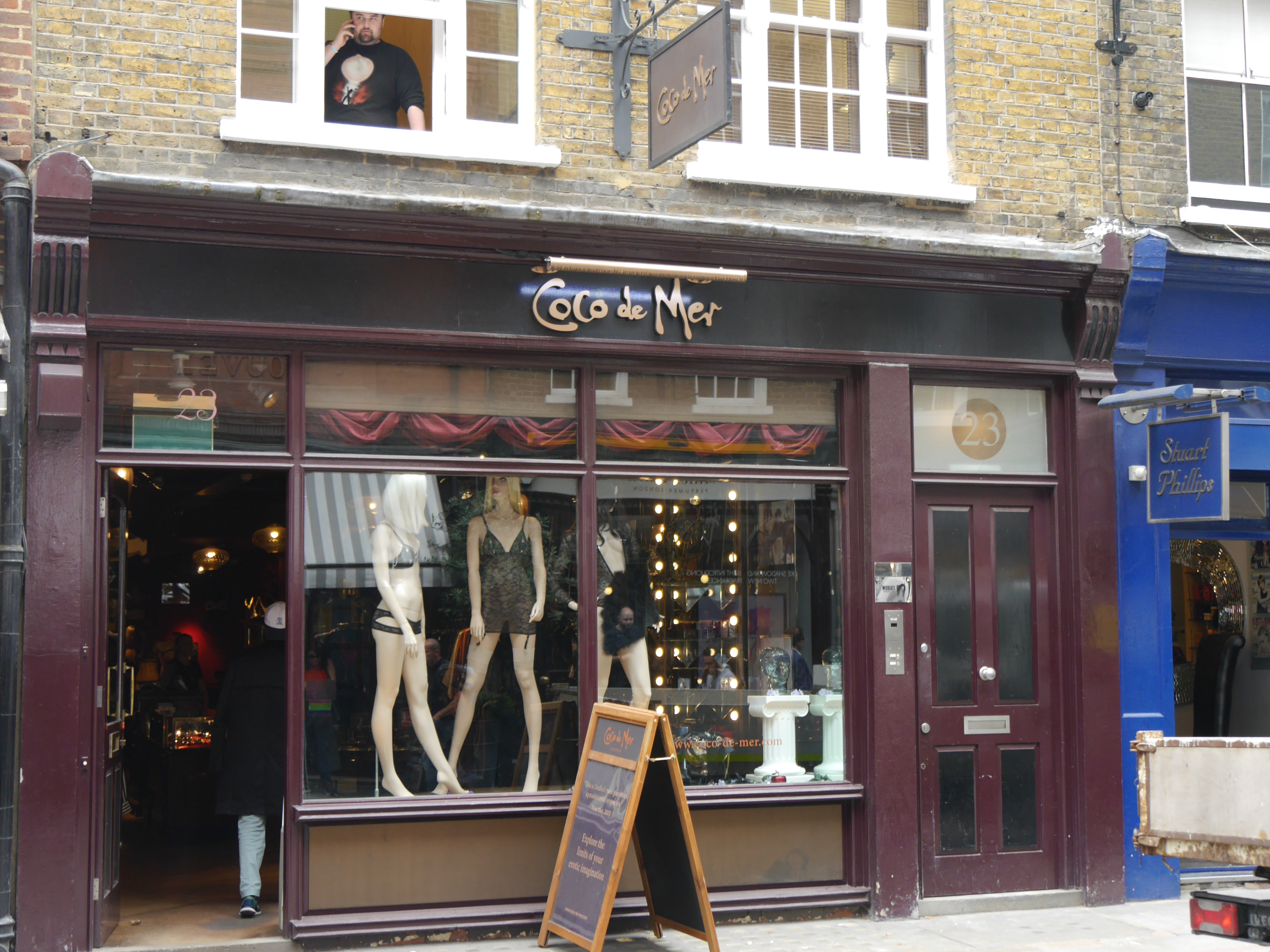
Coco de Mer, London

In December 2001, Roddick opened Coco de Mer in Covent Garden's Monmouth Street with an evening hosted by Dave Stewart, and a fly-poster campaign by Saatchi and Saatchi. In 2004 Roddick was prevented from registering the Coco de Mer name as a trade mark by French fashion designer Coco Chanel, the lawsuit citing the similarity in product range and name.

In 2011 the brand was purchased by British sex shop Lovehoney. In April 2014 former La Perla brand director Lucy Litwack was appointed as managing director of the company. Cristina Ceresoli was also brought on to be interim Chief Marketing Officer.

The name comes from the coco de mer palm tree of the Seychelles, which has the largest seed in the world. The seed is said to resemble a woman's buttocks.

=== Bondage For Freedom ===
Bondage for Freedom was founded in 2008, focusing on fighting for human and environmental rights. It had worked on a number of projects, including the 1994 Rwandan genocide; the release of the "Angola Three"; preventing sex-trafficking; and colony collapse disorder.

== Television ==
Roddick is an advisor on Channel Four tv show The Joy of Teen Sex.
