= 38 Degrees =

British political organization

- Founded: May 2009
- Purpose: Political activism
- Location: United Kingdom
- Key people: Matthew McGregor (CEO)
- Website: 38degrees.org.uk

38 Degrees is a British not-for-profit political-activism organisation. It describes itself as "progressive" and claims to "campaign for fairness, defend rights, promote peace, preserve the planet and deepen democracy in the UK".

38 Degrees takes its name from "the angle at which a pile of snow becomes an avalanche".

== Background ==
The organisation launched on 26 May 2009. The 38 Degrees website states: "38 Degrees was founded by a group of activists and funders concerned about the state of our democracy and determined to try something different. Founders include Gordon Roddick, Henry Tinsley, Pete Myers and Paul Hilder. The project was developed by Ben Brandzel, Nina Kowalska, David Babbs and Warren Puckett. 38 Degrees was founded in memory of Anita Roddick, a lifetime champion of the power of ordinary people to make a difference." Gordon Roddick was previously co-founder of The Body Shop and Henry Tinsley was ex-chairman of Green & Black's chocolate. The organisation launched during the United Kingdom parliamentary expenses scandal, and this formed the backdrop to early campaigns demanding voters were given more powers to sack MPs.

The Executive Director from launch until April 2019 was David Babbs. Babbs was formerly Head of Activism at Friends of the Earth, where he was responsible for the Big Ask Campaign. Babbs also previously worked at People & Planet. Other early staff included Hannah Lownsborough and Johnny Chatterton.

At launch 38 Degrees said it was inspired by groups like MoveOn in the United States, GetUp! in Australia and Avaaz globally. These organisations all use the internet to mobilise people and connect them and their governments.

== Structure ==
38 Degrees is a not-for-profit company limited by guarantee. It was previously registered as Progressive Majority. It has a decentralised and informal structure, with management above a flat-line membership structure. 38 Degrees also claims its campaigns are selected by its members under its "Campaigns by You".

== Personnel ==
David Babbs was the founding Executive Director serving from 2009 to 2019. In December 2011 Babbs was named by The Independent as one of their "Great Britons" for his role in halting a government plan to sell off public forests.

In April 2019 Babbs was dismissed for gross misconduct after it was found that he had shared illegal drugs with other members of staff. In 2020, 38 Degrees announced that an independent report commissioned after the dismissal found proven certain allegations that Babbs had behaved with "unacceptable and unprofessional conduct in the workplace".

Zoe Whyatt served as interim CEO from 2019 to 2021 with Matthew McGregor appointed as CEO in September 2021.

== Methodology ==
38 Degrees describes itself as a people-powered and multi-issue movement. It aims to empower British citizens by providing easy ways for them to take action on the issues they care about, e.g., climate change, human rights and poverty. It claims "it's 38 Degrees members who set priorities and we decide on what we campaign on together". They publish the results of their membership polls on their website. While 38 Degrees refers to 'members', there is no formal membership and these are simply people on its email mailing list.

Each week 50,000 members, chosen at random, are asked to vote for their top priorities; only ones where there is a strong consensus will be pushed forward. On occasion the whole membership is invited to take part in votes to decide the organisation's position on a newsworthy issue. For example, a poll in September 2014 found that members were evenly split on whether to support or oppose military action targeting ISIS in Iraq. As a result, 38 Degrees took no position.

Funding comes from small individual donations. The average donation is about £10 but a plea to fund a legal challenge to zero hours contracts asked for just £1 and received 11,000 responses within 48 hours. Part of its success comes from the speed with which 38 Degrees can launch a campaign or find out members' views.

== See also ==
- Internet activism
- UK Parliament petitions website
