= Host Universal =

British brand strategy network

Host Universal is an ethical brand strategy and communications network founded in 1997 by Robin Smith. Host works with clients on projects that seek to achieve social or environmental impact. Host has a core team in London, UK, and creates specialist teams for digital content such as printing, video creation, film shooting, brand identity and worldwide live events.

== History ==
Host was set up in 1997 to work with Anita Roddick at The Body Shop International. The partnership created a global Self-Esteem strategy and creative campaign featuring Ruby, a size 16 doll, who was presented to be a role model for women. The campaign aimed to bring attention to the issue of the media waif and skeletal supermodels, particularly for eating disorders and extreme diets that develop due to negative self-image. The global Self Esteem strategy was later picked up and utilized by Dove.

== Projects ==
Host has been involved with Cafédirect from the company’s conception through to 2006. Host Universal worked with Cafédirect in developing brand strategy and implementing design and communication work that included the creation of instant coffee product 5065 and the 5065 Lift Theatre group. Host developed the communications strategy behind the Cafédirect Share Issue in 2004. Penny Newman, CEO of Cafédirect, said "we would not be where we are today without Host".

Host works with British Entrepreneur Dale Vince, the founder and CEO of Ecotricity.

One of the projects for Host in 2008 was starting a company called the United Bank of Carbon (UBoC), in partnership with Jonathan Wild, the Chairman of Bettys and Taylors of Harrogate. UBoC aims to develop sustainable investment opportunities for businesses and brands within the world’s remaining rainforest.

In 2009, Host worked on a rebranding project with the World Fair Trade Organization (WFTO). Also in 2009, Host created the World Fair Trade Day website that was the hub for 1,000 events in 70 countries.

In 2010, Host was developing strategy and communications for social finance.

== See also ==
- Business ethics
