= Billie JD Porter =

British journalist, model, and documentary filmmaker

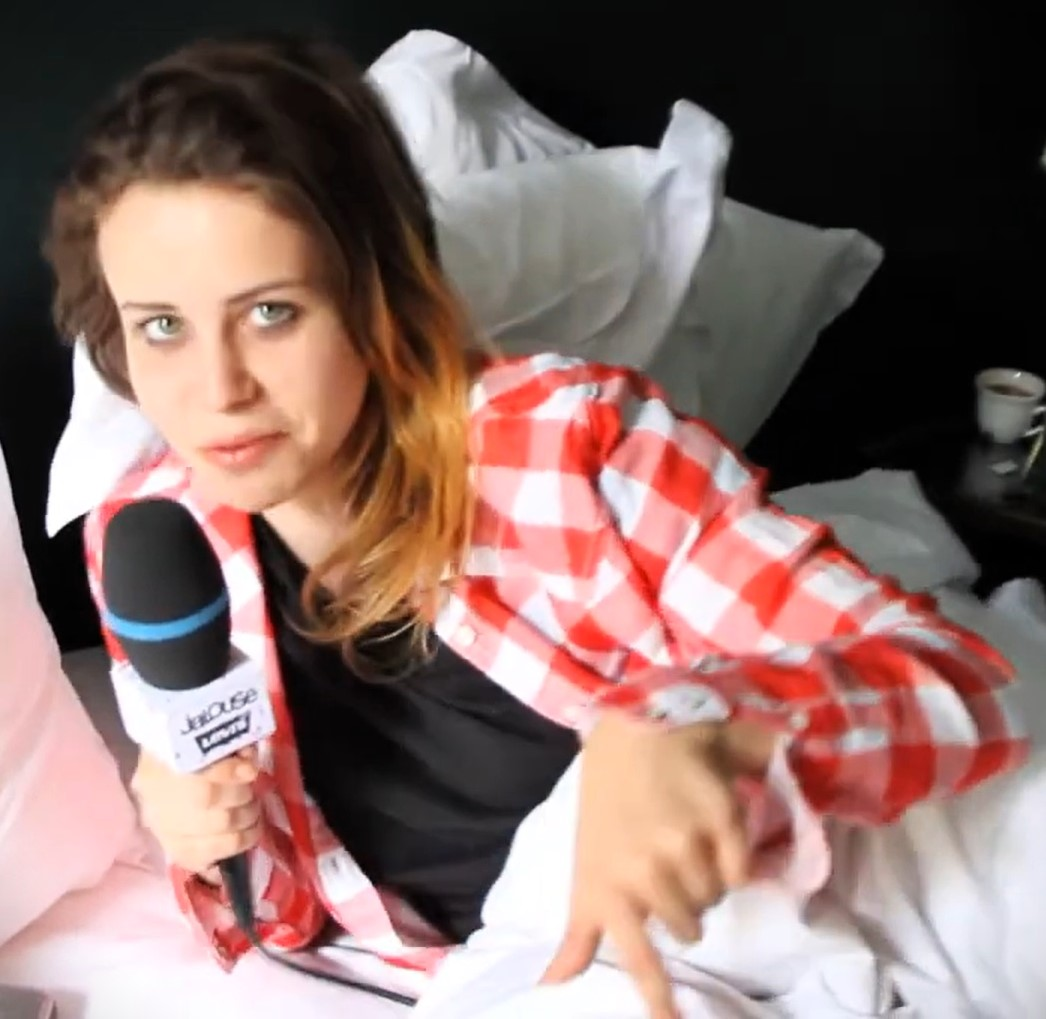
- Porter in a video for Jalouse Magazine in 2011
- Born: 14 June 1992 (age 33)
- Occupations: Journalist; model

Billie JD Porter (born 14 June 1992) is a British journalist, model and documentary filmmaker.

She began her career as a music writer whilst still at school, going on to contribute to titles such as NME, Vice, Dazed & Confused and i-D.

Whilst at Vice she began fronting some of the early video content to appear on the magazine's website, including two documentaries; Rose Boy and Friends and Drunken Glory. Porter has claimed that she was regularly plied with drink and drugs while at Vice, by men twice her age, and propositioned for sex. She made these claims on Channel 4 after Vice was handing out literature at Me Too marches some years later.

Her breakthrough as a TV presenter came at age 18 as a roving reporter on Channel 4's controversial factual entertainment series The Joy of Teen Sex.

In 2014 Porter fronted a three part documentary series for BBC Three called Secrets of South America filmed across Argentina, Venezuela and Brazil. Its success lead to a commission of a second series called Secrets of China.

Porter is one of the youngest reporters to have reported for Channel 4 News, for whom she interviewed Clive James and hosted a political segment ahead of the 2015 General Election.

In 2017, Porter created and exec-produced Sound and Vision, a four-part documentary series for Channel 4's late night music slate. It featured artists including: Mykki Blanco, Lady Leshurr, Hatsune Miku and Fuse ODG.

She campaigned against Brexit, and formed an initiative around youth engagement in politics called Use Your Voice, producing a short film about perception of the political class, and spearheading a digital social media campaign encouraging young people to vote in the 2017 election.

She directed and produced the documentary "It's Different For Girls" on the gender bias in reproductive health that premiered at the 2025 Hot Docs film festival in 2025. She also keeps appearing in discussions on societal subjects like e.g. at the St. Gallen Symposium 2025 along with Katherine Maher.
