= Children on the Edge =

Child rights organisation in England

- Founded: 1990
- Founder: Late Dame Anita Roddick and Rachel Bentley OBE
- Registration no.: Registered Charity no. 1101441
- Legal status: Charitable organisation
- Headquarters: Chichester, England
- Website: www.childrenontheedge.org

Children on the Edge is a non-profit charitable organisation dedicated to working on behalf of some of the most marginalised children around the world.

The organisation is based in Chichester, England and was founded by the owner of The Body Shop, Dame Anita Roddick, (DBE) in 1990 following her visit to several Romanian orphanages. It was co-founded by Rachel Bentley (OBE), who has led the organisation to this day.

Children on the Edge started off in Romanian orphanages, but has since expanded to cover over 18 countries throughout Eastern Europe and Asia, including Bangladesh, Burma, India, Thailand, Lebanon, Afghanistan and Uganda. The charity exists to help children who are living on the edge of their societies around the world. They focus on some of the most marginalised children, who are overlooked by governments, larger organisations, the media and the international community.

We use our size to innovate, test, and refine high-quality education and protection models for children living on the edge. This is what we call ‘the mosquito effect ’-stemming from our Co-founder Anita Roddick’s much-loved quote “If you think you're too small to have an impact, try going to bed with a mosquito”. With our sharp focus, we can raise standards across the sector, creating benchmarks that can be scaled by much larger agencies.

— Rachel Bentley OBE - CEO and co-founder

== History ==
=== 1990–1999 ===
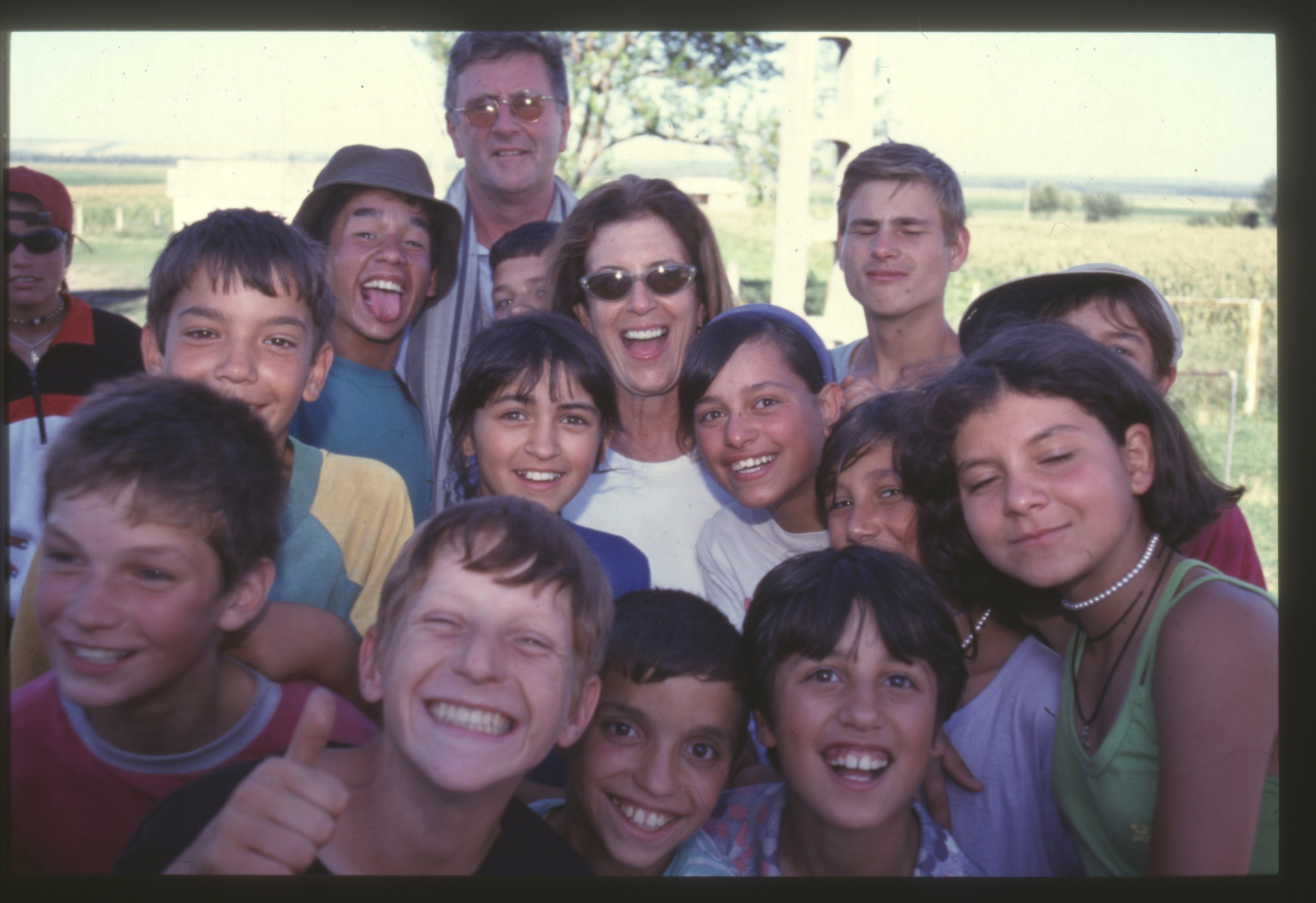
Dame Anita Roddick in Romania in the early days of Children on the Edge

After Anita Roddick visited Romania for the first time in 1990, The Body Shop until 1996 undertook refurbishment of three orphanages, provided medical help, and organised annual play schemes. At this time the organisation were entitled "The Body Shop Romania Relief Appeal".

By 1999, the organisation had established the "Big Brothers Big Sisters" programme in Romania for children without parental care. They also provided mobile sanitation units in Albania for refugees from the Kosovan crisis.

=== 2000–2009 ===
The following year, they worked on rebuilding a school in Kosovo, which was destroyed during Kosovan crisis. Much of the experience in Europe contributed to the organisation being invited by UNICEF to implement a Child Friendly Space in a post conflict environment in Viqueque, East Timor.

From 2002 to 2005 they continued to refurbish schools in Kosovo, established semi-independent living apartments for orphaned children in Romania and also opened two Special Needs Day care centres in Romania to help prevent these children being forced into state institutions.

In 2004, Children on the Edge registered as an independent charity and, using the model they had developed in East Timor, established a Child and Community Centre in Aceh, Indonesia helping children and their community rebuild their lives after the traumas of the Asian Tsunami.

Throughout 2006 and 2007 they began work on the Thailand/Burma border, helping Burmese refugees and migrants fleeing persecution from a brutal military regime within their homeland. This started out with the provision of nurseries, which were set up in Ei Htu Hta Refugee camp on the banks of the Salween River.

In 2008, they began the following projects: Apartment Schools in Malaysia for Chin refugees from Myanmar; created a scholarships programme in India for Chin refugee children from Myanmar; and developed standards of care in Thai Boarding Houses for Karen refugees from Myanmar.

Their first trip to Bangladesh was undertaken in 2009, which marked the beginning of their work with the unregistered Rohingya community in the makeshift Kutupalong camp, providing low profile education for their children.Concurrently they began supporting nine Learning Centres for slum dwelling children in neighbouring Cox's Bazar.

=== 2010–2019 ===
After the 2010 Haitian earthquake, they started supporting a sports and education programme children in the slums of Port au Prince, Haiti.

In 2012, they established a Child Friendly Space, agricultural training programme and a voluntary Child Protection Team in Soweto Slum, Jinja, Uganda.

To continue their work with children displaced by conflict, the following year Children on the Edge started providing Early Childhood Development and support for children displaced by war and living in the remote IDP camps of Kachin State, Myanmar.

In 2014, they began supporting an education programme for ‘untouchable’ Dalit children in Bihar State, India. At this time they also began to provide support for children in brothel communities on the India/Nepal border. Again working with refugee children, 2014 was also the year they started investing in tent schools for Syrian children living in the informal settlements of Bekaa Valley, Lebanon.

Work in Uganda had been progressing over the last two years and in 2015 Children on the Edge Africa was registered in Uganda. The new Ugandan team was expanding the work of Child Protection Team in Soweto to further slum areas surrounding Jinja

In 2017, the Rohingya genocide triggered over 700,000 more Rohingya refugees to flee to Bangladesh, into the areas on the border where the charity was providing education. They responded with a brief humanitarian relief programme and expanded education work in the camps for 7,500 children.

The following year, they also established ten Learning Centres for Rohingya refugee children in the Doharazi Enclaves, Bangladesh.

Using a model built up in the Jinja slum areas, and experience developed in Kachin State, Myanmar, in 2019 they began to replicate their Early Childhood Development work by supporting Congolese refugee communities in Kyaka II, Uganda to provide high quality early years education for their children.

The organisation also worked to break down language barriers for Rohingya children in Kutupalong refugee camp by establishing a video newsletter, called Moja Kids, and their Digital Education Programme.

=== 2020–2026 ===
When the global pandemic struck in 2020, the team pivoted to emergency coronavirus response efforts, distributing 12,850 essential supply parcels to vulnerable households and adapting educational programming into home provision and small group instruction for over 16,000 children. This pivot sparked the creation of the Cluster Learning Model for Congolese children living in the Kyaka II refugee settlement, Uganda.

Advocacy efforts reached a major milestone in 2021 when years of campaigning against child sacrifice in Uganda culminated in the passing of "The Prevention and Prohibition of Human Sacrifice Bill".

By 2022, the organisation was delivering emergency support to Ukrainian refugees in Moldova and Romania while expanding its Rohingya education programming to Bhasan Char Island in Bangladesh. Recognition for this scope of work came when CEO and Co-founder Rachel Bentley was awarded an OBE for services to the protection and education of marginalised children worldwide.

The year 2023 saw widespread international expansion and innovation for the organisation. Children on the Edge partnered with Angela Ghayour, an activist and teacher from Afghanistan, to provide online education access for thousands of girls banned from school by the Taliban. Building on a decade of success, the organisation replicated its Child Protection Team model in Karamoja - Uganda's poorest district - establishing new teams and deep community ties. In response to intensifying civil war in Myanmar, emergency support and safe spaces were provided for Karenni communities facing regular airstrikes in Kayah State. Meanwhile, in Uganda, the team piloted a play-based approach and tool tailored for Congolese children.

In 2024, the organisation piloted Rohingya language lessons in Bangladesh, offering refugees the opportunity to read and write in their native language for the first time. This was featured on BBC Radio 4 Appeal in October 2025, narrated by actress Susannah Fielding. During 2024 they also mobilised emergency assistance for families displaced by conflict in Lebanon.

As displaced Kachin communities began returning to their home villages in 2025, Children on the Edge supported the replication of Early Childhood Education centres to guarantee continuous learning for returnee children.

By 2026, the Children on the Edge Africa team advised the Ugandan government on play-based learning for the Early Childhood Care and Education (ECCE) Policy 2025, taking part in its official launch in April. The same year, they launched the open-source Rohingya Zoban (language) App in Kutupalong camp, Bangladesh, giving Rohingya refugees a digital tool to master their mother tongue.
