= The Joy of Teen Sex =

- Narrated by: Claudie Blakley
- Country of origin: United Kingdom
- Original language: English
- No. of series: 2
- No. of episodes: 7 (to 24 November 2011)

Original release
- Network: Channel 4
- Release: 19 January 2011 – present

The Joy of Teen Sex is a British television show on Channel 4 that delves into the world of teenagers and sex. This includes sexual experiences, sexual health, trends and relationship issues. The first series ran from 19 January to 9 February 2011, and aired four episodes. The second series comprises six episodes and began on 27 October 2011.

== Cast ==
The Joy of Teen Sex is hosted by a team of women with different specialties:

=== Claudie Blakley ===
Claudie Blakley is the show's narrator.

=== Ruth Corden ===
Corden has a degree in social work and acts as the show's advisor. She discusses sexual issues with teens and advises them on how to work through their issue. She is the younger sister of comedian James Corden.

=== Rachael Jones ===
Jones is the show's resident doctor. She discusses sexual health issues with the teens and educates them on STDs and STIs.

=== Joanna Wierzbicka ===
Wierzbicka provides teenagers with coaching on how to have sex, from positions, toys and even lubrication.

=== Billie Porter ===
Porter is a roaming teenage reporter, she investigates emerging trends that teenagers are dealing with including internet sex and piercings to glamour models, strippers and dating over the phone.

=== Sam Roddick ===
Roddick gives advice to couples.

=== Emma Kenny ===
Appears as one of the main hosts and counsellors on series two.

== Controversy ==
In February, a letter to Channel 4 was delivered claiming the broadcaster and the programme's producers have not acted responsibly or fulfilled their public service remit. The letter, signed by 23 health and education professionals and bodies, describes Joy of Teen Sex as "fitting a pattern of programme development where viewing figures are prioritised over empowerment but where programmes are still marketed as 'educational'". The letter to Channel 4 expresses the group's unease about several key issues, including what they claim is the lack of qualified professionals on the show, poor advice, and inaccurate and misleading information.

== See also ==
- Adolescent sexuality in the United Kingdom
