= European Liver Patients' Association =

European NGO for liver patients

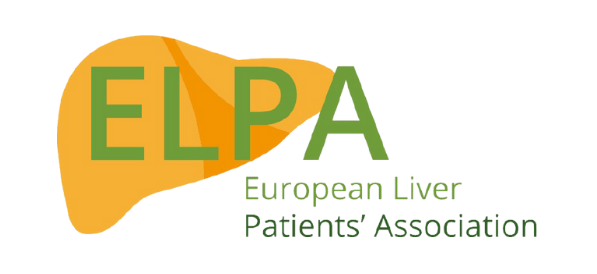
- Abbreviation: ELPA
- Formation: 2004
- Type: Non-Governmental Organisation (NGO)
- Headquarters: Place du Champ de Mars, Level 11 and 12, 1050 Brussels, Belgium
- Region served: Europe
- Official language: English
- Website: https://elpa.eu/

The European Liver Patients' Association (ELPA) is an international non-governmental organisation best known for its role in patient advocacy concerning liver diseases. ELPA is an umbrella organisation representing 40 members stemming from 30 European and non-European countries.

== History ==
ELPA was created in June 2004, when 13 liver patient groups from 10 European and Mediterranean countries met to create the association. ELPA was formally launched in Paris on 14 April 2005 during the annual conference of the European Association for the Study of the Liver (EASL).

Nowadays, ELPA represents 40 liver patients' organisations from 30 different countries (Albania, Belgium, Bosnia and Herzegovina, Cyprus, Croatia, Denmark, Egypt, Finland, France, Georgia, Hungary, Ireland, Israel, Italy, Kazakhstan, Montenegro, Netherlands, North Macedonia, Norway, Poland, Portugal, Romania, Russia, Serbia, Slovakia, Slovenia, Spain, Sweden, Turkey, United Kingdom).

== Objectives ==
ELPA aims to promote the interests of people with liver disease and, in particular:

- to highlight the size of the problem;
- to promote awareness and prevention;
- to address the low profile of liver disease;
- to share the experience of successful initiatives;
- to work with professional bodies to ensure that treatment and care are harmonised across Europe to the highest standards.

== Structure ==
ELPA vision and activities are coordinated and supervised by an elected president, and a Governing Board made up of Directors who belong to an organisation that is a full member of the association.

One of the Directors is also the Treasurer of the Association. As ELPA deals with many medical and scientific contents, a Scientific Committee formed by Medical Doctors and researchers has been appointed. The Secretariat in Brussels runs all day-by-day activities in the heart of the EU capital.

ELPA is an official Non-Profit Organisation with international goals based in Brussels, governed by Belgian law for NonProfit Organisation (ASBL). Official roles and procedures of the association were published on the Moniteur Belge in 2005.

To better communicate with its supporters and stakeholders, ELPA has obtained the ISO 9001:2015 quality standard in 2021, making it the first patients' association in Europe with a quality management system

ELPA is a member of the European Patient Forum since 2011.

== Activities ==
=== Policy and Advocacy ===
As an umbrella patients' association, ELPA acts as an intermediary between all the involved stakeholders - the national patients' communities, the industry, and the EU policymakers. It provides a different perspective based on the fact that ELPA, through its members, has immediate and direct access to the patients' lives and the best practices in a national and regional context.

As one voice, ELPA works to promote the development and implementation of policies, strategies, and healthcare services that empower patients to engage in decision-making. To this end, ELPA is part of different international organisations.

List of ELPA memberships
| Organisation | Body of Membership |
|---|---|
| Directorate General of Health of Portugal | Advisor for the National Program on Viral Hepatitis |
| European Association for the Study of the Liver (EASL) | Policy and Public Health Committee |
| European Centre for Disease Prevention and Control (ECDC) | Advisory Forum |
| European Centre for Disease Prevention and Control (ECDC) | Hepatitis B and C Network |
| European Medicines Agency (EMA) | Patient and consumer Working Party Pharmacovigilance Risk Assessment Committee |
| Viral Hepatitis Prevention Board (VHPB) | Expert Board |
| World Health Organisation (WHO) | Expert Group on HIV, TB, and Hepatitis |
| European Commission | European Health Emergency Preparedness and Response Authority |

=== Participation in Medical Research Projects ===
ELPA is currently involved in 10 ongoing medical research projects. 8 are funded by the European Commission through the Horizon 2020 program, 1 by the European Institute of Innovation and Technology (EIT).

| Name of Project | Complete Name of Project | Topic | Coordinator | Involved Countries |
|---|---|---|---|---|
| A-Tango | Novel Treatment of Acute on Chronic Liver Failure Using Synergistis Action of G-CSF and TAK-242 | New interventions for Non-Communicable Diseases | European Foundation for the Study of Chronic Liver Failure (EF-Clif) | Belgium, France, Germany, Ireland, Netherlands, Spain, Switzerland, United Kingdom |
| Cobalt | COvid-19 vaccination and Biomarkers in cirrhosis And post-Liver Transplantation | | European Foundation for the Study of Chronic Liver Failure (EF-Clif) | |
| Decision | Decompensated Cirrhosis: Identification of New Combinatorial Therapies based on Systems Approaches | Systems approaches for the discovery of combinatorial therapies for complex disorders | European Foundation for the Study of Chronic Liver Failure (EF-Clif) | Belgium, Denmark, France, Germany, Italy, Netherlands, Spain, Sweden, Switzerland, United Kingdom |
| Escalon | European-Latin American network for the assessment of biomarkers to predict and diagnose hepatobiliary malignancies and characterization of risk factors for cancer development | Translational collaborative cancer research between Europe and the Community of Latin American and Caribbean States (CELAC) | Erasmus Universitair Medisch Centrum Rotterdam | Argentina, Belgium, Brazil, Canada, Chile, Colombia, Ecuador, Germany, Netherlands, Peru, Spain, United Kingdom |
| FiSPlat | FibroScan Screening Platform | Product and Service Development | Genesis-Biomed | Belgium, France, Netherlands, Spain, United States |
| Galaxy | Gut-and-liver axis in alcoholic liver fibrosis | Understanding disease: systems medicine | Syddansk Universitet | Belgium, Denmark, Germany, Greece, Netherlands, Norway |
| IP-Cure-B | Immune Profiling to guide host-directed interventions to cure HBV infections | Stratified host-directed approaches to improve prevention, treatment and/or cure of infectious diseases | Institut National de la Sante et de la Recherche Medicale (INSERM) | Belgium, France, Germany, Greece, Italy, Spain, Sweden, Switzerland, United States |
| LiverHope | Simvastatin and Rifaximin as new therapy for patients with decompensated cirrhosis | New therapies for chronic diseases | Consorci Institut D'Investigacions Biomèdiques August Pi i Sunyer (IDIBAPS) | Belgium, France, Germany, Italy, Netherlands, Spain, Switzerland, United Kingdom |
| LiverScreen | Screening for liver fibrosis - population-based study across European countries | Towards risk-based screening strategies for non-communicable diseases | Fundació Clínic per a la Recerca Biomèdica | Belgium, Croatia, Denmark, France, Germany, Italy, Netherlands, Spain, Switzerland |
| MicroB-Predict | MICROBiome-based biomarkers to PREDICT decompensation of liver cirrhosis and treatment response | Exploiting research outcomes and application potential of the human microbiome for personalised prediction, prevention and treatment of disease | European Foundation for the Study of Chronic Liver Failure (EF-Clif) | Belgium, Denmark, France, Germany, Hungary, Netherlands, Norway, Spain, Switzerland, United Kingdom |

=== ELPA Main Outcomes ===
- 2012 - Launch of the Euro Hepatitis Care Index.
- 2015 - Launch of the Call to Action Report Time to DeLiver: Getting a Grip on Hepatic Encephalopathy.
- 2016 - Publishing of the Hep-Core Report - Monitoring the implementation of hepatitis B and C policy recommendations in Europe.
- 2016 - Release of the documentary Hep C – From Hell To Hope to educate and generate awareness about progress and remaining challenges towards achieving HCV elimination, in collaboration with Hetz - Israeli Association For The Health Of the Liver, World Hepatitis Alliance, directed by Ricard Mamblona and produced by Prodiggi Films.
- 2019 - Launch of the White Paper on Hepatic Encephalopathy.
- 2020 - Feedback on Europe's Beating Cancer Plan.
- 2021 - Launch of the Call to Action on Fatty Liver.
- 2021 - Launch of the White Paper on Liver Cancer jointly with Digestive Cancers Europe.
