= Anita Roddick =

British businesswoman and activist (1942–2007)

Dame Anita Roddick DBE
- Born: Anita Lucia Perella; 23 October 1942; Littlehampton, West Sussex, England
- Died: 10 September 2007 (aged 64); Chichester, West Sussex, England
- Known for: Businesswoman, founder of The Body Shop, charity work
- Title: Dame Commander of the Order of the British Empire
- Spouse: Sir (Thomas) Gordon Roddick (m. 1970–2007, her death)
- Children: 2, including Sam
- Website: www.anitaroddick.com

Dame Anita Lucia Roddick DBE (née Perella; 23 October 1942 – 10 September 2007) was a British businesswoman, human rights activist and environmental campaigner, best known as the founder of The Body Shop, The Body Shop International Limited, a cosmetics company producing and retailing natural beauty products which shaped ethical consumerism. The company was one of the first to prohibit the use of products being tested on animals in some of its products and one of the first to promote fair trade with developing countries.

Roddick was involved in activism and campaigning for environmental and social issues, including involvement with Greenpeace and the newspaper The Big Issue. In 1990, she founded Children on the Edge, a charitable organisation which helps disadvantaged children in Eastern Europe, Africa and Asia. She believed that business should offer a form of moral leadership, being a more powerful force in society than religion or government.

== Early life ==
Anita Lucia Perella was born in a bomb shelter in Littlehampton, Sussex. She was one of four children of Gilda (née de Vito), wife of restaurateur Donato Perella. Her biological father was Donato's cousin, Henry Perilli, an ice-cream and soda bar proprietor. Her surname at birth was registered as Perella.

She was educated in Littlehampton, at St Joseph's Convent and Maude Allen secondary modern school. She then trained as a schoolteacher at Newton Park College of Education in Bath, Somerset, following which she taught history and English at Maude Allen school.

== The Body Shop ==
Roddick opened her first Body Shop in Brighton, England in 1976, with the goal of earning an income for herself and her two daughters while her husband was away in South America. She wanted to provide quality skincare products in refillable containers and sample sizes, all marketed with truth rather than hype. She opened her second shop six months later. On her husband's return, he joined the business.

In a May 2002 article in The Globe and Mail, Jon Entine reported that Roddick had copied the name, concept and original brochures from the original Body Shop which was started in Berkeley, California in 1970 and had three stores when Roddick visited the Bay Area in the early 1970s. Roddick's original brochures were near-verbatim copies of material produced by the Berkeley-based Body Shop. When Roddick decided to expand her multinational corporation into the United States, she bought the rights to the Body Shop name for $3.5 million from the original shop owners, who were required to sign a confidentiality agreement at the time. As a consequence the original Body Shop renamed itself Body Time; it remained in business until April 2018.

By 1991, the Body Shop had 700 branches, and Roddick was awarded the 1991 World Vision Award for Development Initiative. In 1996 she told Third Way:

The original Body Shop was a series of brilliant accidents. It had a great smell, it had a funky name. It was positioned between two funeral parlours—that always caused controversy. It was incredibly sensuous. It was 1976, the year of the heatwave, so there was a lot of flesh around. We knew about storytelling then, so all the products had stories. We recycled everything, not because we were environmentally friendly, but because we didn't have enough bottles. It was a good idea. What was unique about it, with no intent at all, no marketing nous, was that it translated across cultures, across geographical barriers and social structures. It wasn't a sophisticated plan, it just happened like that.

In 1997, Roddick developed Body Shop's most successful campaign, creating Ruby, the size 16 doll, who was thought to bear a passing resemblance to Barbie. The campaign evolved from positioning developed by ethical communications consultancy Host Universal, who created the image of the naked red-haired doll, hands behind her head and wind in her hair, that became the embodiment of the campaign. The photographer was Steve Perry.

By 2004, the company had 1,980 stores, serving more than 77 million customers throughout the world. It was voted the second most-trusted brand in the United Kingdom, and 28th top brand in the world.

In March 2006, L'Oréal purchased Body Shop for £652 million. Some controversy and criticism was raised, as L'Oréal was known to use animal testing and the company was part-owned by Nestlé, which had been criticised for its treatment of third-world producers. Roddick addressed the issues directly in an interview with The Guardian. It reported that:

...she sees herself as a kind of 'Trojan horse' who by selling her business to a huge firm will be able to influence the decisions it makes. Suppliers who had formerly worked with the Body Shop will in future have contracts with L'Oréal, and whilst working with the company 25 days a year Roddick was able to have an input into decisions.

== Charitable work ==
Roddick was known for her campaigning work on environmental issues and was a member of the advisory council for the think tank, Demos. However, despite her high profile statements regarding The Body Shop's charitable mission, it did not make charitable donations for its first 11 years of operation. After the company entered the stock exchange in 1984, the first sponsorship, made possible by the money generated by the IPO, was for Greenpeace posters in 1985.

In 1990 Roddick founded Children on the Edge (COTE), in response to her visits to Romanian orphanages. She created COTE to help manage the crisis of poor conditions in the overcrowded orphanages and worked to de-institutionalise the children over the course of their early life. COTE's mission is to help disadvantaged children affected by conflicts, natural disasters, disabilities, and HIV/AIDS.

In the late 1990s, Roddick became involved in the case of the Angola Three, African-American men who had been held for more than two decades in solitary confinement at Louisiana State Penitentiary. She helped raise international awareness of their case and funds to support appeals of their flawed convictions.

On 13 December 2005, the National Post reported that Roddick had announced that she intended to use her fortune for philanthropy; it was estimated at £51 million ($104 million). This was before the sale of her business to L'Oreal.

Roddick wrote a book, Take It Personally. She encouraged equality and an end to the exploitation of workers and children in underdeveloped countries.

Between 2009 and 2014, the Roddick Foundation gave four grants totalling £120,000 to CAGE, an organisation led by Mozzam Begg, that aimed "to raise awareness of the plight of the prisoners at Guantánamo Bay and other detainees held as part of the War on Terror". The Foundation, along with two other charities, agreed to cease funding CAGE under pressure from Britain's Charity Commission, which had expressed concern that funding CAGE risked damaging public confidence in charity. Lord Carlile, formerly the British Government's independent reviewer of anti-terrorism legislation, said: "I would never advise anybody to give money to CagePrisoners. I have concerns about the group".

In 2015, the Charity Commission agreed to cease to interfere with charities' right to fund CAGE, if they wished, following a judicial review which heard testimony that a British cabinet minister and US intelligence had applied pressure on the body to investigate CAGE.

== Illness ==
In 2004, Roddick was diagnosed with liver cirrhosis due to long-standing hepatitis C. She did not reveal her illness until February 2007. She said, "I have hepatitis C. It's a bit of a bummer, but you groan and move on". She subsequently promoted the work of The Hepatitis C Trust, and campaigned to increase awareness of the disease.

On 30 August 2007, less than two weeks before her death, she was a special guest in an episode of the live television programme Doctor, Doctor broadcast on Channel 5 in the UK. She discussed hepatitis C with the presenter and general practitioner, Mark Porter. Roddick said that she had developed cirrhosis of the liver, and that her main symptoms were itching and poor concentration. She briefly mentioned that medical treatment with interferon did not suit her. She said that she kept fit and active, and that she attended biannual out-patient hospital appointments in Southampton, as well as being kept under review by the liver transplant team at the Addenbrooke's Hospital in Cambridge.

== Death ==
Dame Anita Roddick died of a stroke on 10 September 2007, after being admitted to St Richard's Hospital, Chichester, the previous evening suffering from a severe headache. As promised earlier, she left her estate to charities rather than to her family and friends. When details of her estate were published, it was disclosed that she had donated all of her £51 million assets upon her death.

After her death, her widower, Gordon Roddick, founded 38 Degrees in her memory. He said, "I knew what would make Anita really laugh would be to cause a lot of trouble." Gordon (né Thomas Gordon Roddick) was knighted in the 2025 Birthday Honours.

== Awards and honours ==
- 1984 – Veuve Clicquot Businesses Woman of the Year
- 1988 – Officer of the Order of the British Empire (OBE)
- 1988 – Honorary Doctorate from the University of Sussex
- 1991 – Center for World Development Education's World Vision Award, USA
- 1993 – Banksia Foundation's Australia Environmental Award
- 1993 – Mexican Environmental Achiever Award
- 1993 – National Audubon Society Medal, USA
- 1994 – Botwinick Prize in Business Ethics, USA
- 1994 – University of Michigan's Annual Business Leadership Award, USA
- 1995 - University of Victoria, Honorary Doctorate, Canada
- 1995 – Women's Business Development Center's First Annual Woman Power Award, USA
- 1996 – Women's Center's Leadership Award, USA
- 1996 – The Gleitsman Foundation's Award of Achievement, USA
- 1997 – United Nations Environment Programme (UNEP), Honouree, Eyes on the Environment
- 1999 – Honorary Degree (Doctor of Laws) from the University of Bath
- 1999 – British Environment & Media Award
- 1999 – Chief Wiper-Away of Ogoni Tears, Movement for the Survival of the Ogoni People, Nigeria
- 2001 – International Peace Prayer Day Organisation's Woman of Peace
- 2003 – Dame Commander of the Order of the British Empire (DBE)
- 2004 – Honorary Doctorate of Public Service, The Sage Colleges
- 2005 – Shell liveWIRE survey of inspirational role models, third place after 1) Richard Branson 2) Friends/family 3) Anita Roddick 4) James Dyson 5) Sahar Hashemi
- 2006 – Spirit of the Rainforest Award, Rainforest Action Network

== Bibliography ==
Roddick wrote and published several books related to her business:

- The Body Shop Book – Macdonald, 1985 (ISBN 0-356-10934-8)
- Mamatoto: the Body Shop Celebration of Birth – Virago, 1991 (ISBN 1-85381-421-0)
- (with Russell Miller) – Body and Soul – Ebury Press, 1991 (ISBN 0-7126-4719-8)
- Take it personally: How Globalisation Affects You and Powerful Ways to Challenge It – Anita Roddick Books, 2004
- Troubled Water: Saints, Sinners, Truth and Lies about the Global Water Crisis – Anita Roddick Books, 2004 (with Brooke Shelby Biggs)
- Business as Unusual – Anita Roddick Books, 2005 (ISBN 0-9543959-5-6) (Latest edition)
