= World Hepatitis Alliance =

- Formation: 2007; 19 years ago
- Founded: 2007
- Founder: Charles Gore
- Type: Non-governmental organization
- Location: 86bis, route de Frontenex, Case Postale 6364 1211 Genève 6
- Website: www.worldhepatitisalliance.org

The World Hepatitis Alliance (WHA) is an international non-governmental organisation best known for its role in advocating and awareness-raising for the elimination of viral hepatitis. The organisation represents 249 members from 84 countries worldwide. WHA holds official relations status at the World Health Organization (WHO), and consultative status at the United Nations Economic and Social Council (ECOSOC).

== Creation ==
In 2006, hepatitis patient groups began working to raise awareness of the issue by advocating for the establishment of a global World Hepatitis Day. Subsequently, in 2007, these groups formed the World Hepatitis Alliance to manage, organise and promote World Hepatitis Day.

== Development ==
In 2012, the World Hepatitis Alliance was granted official Relations status with the World Health Organization (WHO). In 2013, the organisation received consultative status at the United Nations Economic and Social Council (ECOSOC).

In 2013, the WHA organised a side meeting at the World Health Assembly on behalf of Brazil to discuss the lack of global progress in addressing viral hepatitis. As a result of the meeting Egypt volunteered to put hepatitis on the Assembly agenda for the following year and Brazil agreed to draft a new resolution. Following this, the WHA assisted Brazil in the drafting of the resolution and engaged in consultations with other key Member States.

In September 2015, the WHA and the WHO convened over 175 organisations and individuals from 55 countries, at the inaugural World Hepatitis Summit, which aimed to build momentum towards the development of comprehensive national plans within the framework of the Global Health Sector Strategy (GHSS). The GHSS states in its introduction: "viral hepatitis is an international public health challenge, comparable to other major communicable diseases, including HIV, tuberculosis and malaria. Despite the significant burden it places on communities across all global regions, hepatitis has been largely ignored as a health and development priority until recently."

Supported by continued efforts from the World Hepatitis Alliance the GHSS was adopted within resolution WHA69.22 by 194 governments at the 69th World Health Assembly, in 2016. According to the WHO The Global Health Sector Strategy on Viral Hepatitis is the first of its kind and, when implemented, will contribute to the achievement of the 2030 Agenda for Sustainable Development.

== Ongoing activities ==
=== World Hepatitis Day ===
One of four disease-specific world health days, World Hepatitis Day is held annually on 28 July. Hepatitis groups, patients and advocates worldwide take part in events to mark the occasion. A Guinness World Record was created in 2012 when 12,588 people from 20 countries did the Three Wise Monkeys actions on World Hepatitis Day to signify the willful ignorance of the disease.

Following the adoption of a resolution during the 63rd World Health Assembly in May 2010, World Hepatitis Day was given global endorsement as the primary focus for national and international awareness-raising efforts and the date was changed to July 28.

World Hepatitis Day is recognised in over 100 countries each year through events such as free screenings, poster campaigns, demonstrations, concerts, talk shows, flash mobs and vaccination drives. Each year a report is published by WHO and WHA detailing all the events across the world.

=== World Hepatitis Summit ===
In 2015, the first World Hepatitis Summit was convened by the WHO and World Hepatitis Alliance with the aim of uniting World Hepatitis Alliance members, civil society groups, representatives from WHO Member States, public health specialists, pharmaceutical companies and media. The biennial summit identifies best practices in the prevention of viral hepatitis and recommends steps national governments take toward the elimination of viral hepatitis.

=== NOhep ===
NOhep was created by the World Hepatitis Alliance with the aim of becoming a global movement to eliminate viral hepatitis.

== Structure ==
WHA is governed by an Executive Board made up of six Regional Board Members and the President, all of whom must be chronic viral hepatitis patients: someone who has or has had chronic hepatitis B or chronic hepatitis C infection. The Regional Board Members each represent one of the six WHO regions. They are elected every two years by a majority vote of the Voting Members of their respective regions. The President is elected every four years by majority vote of the Executive Board.
