= The Body Shop =

British cosmetics and skin care company

The Body Shop International Limited

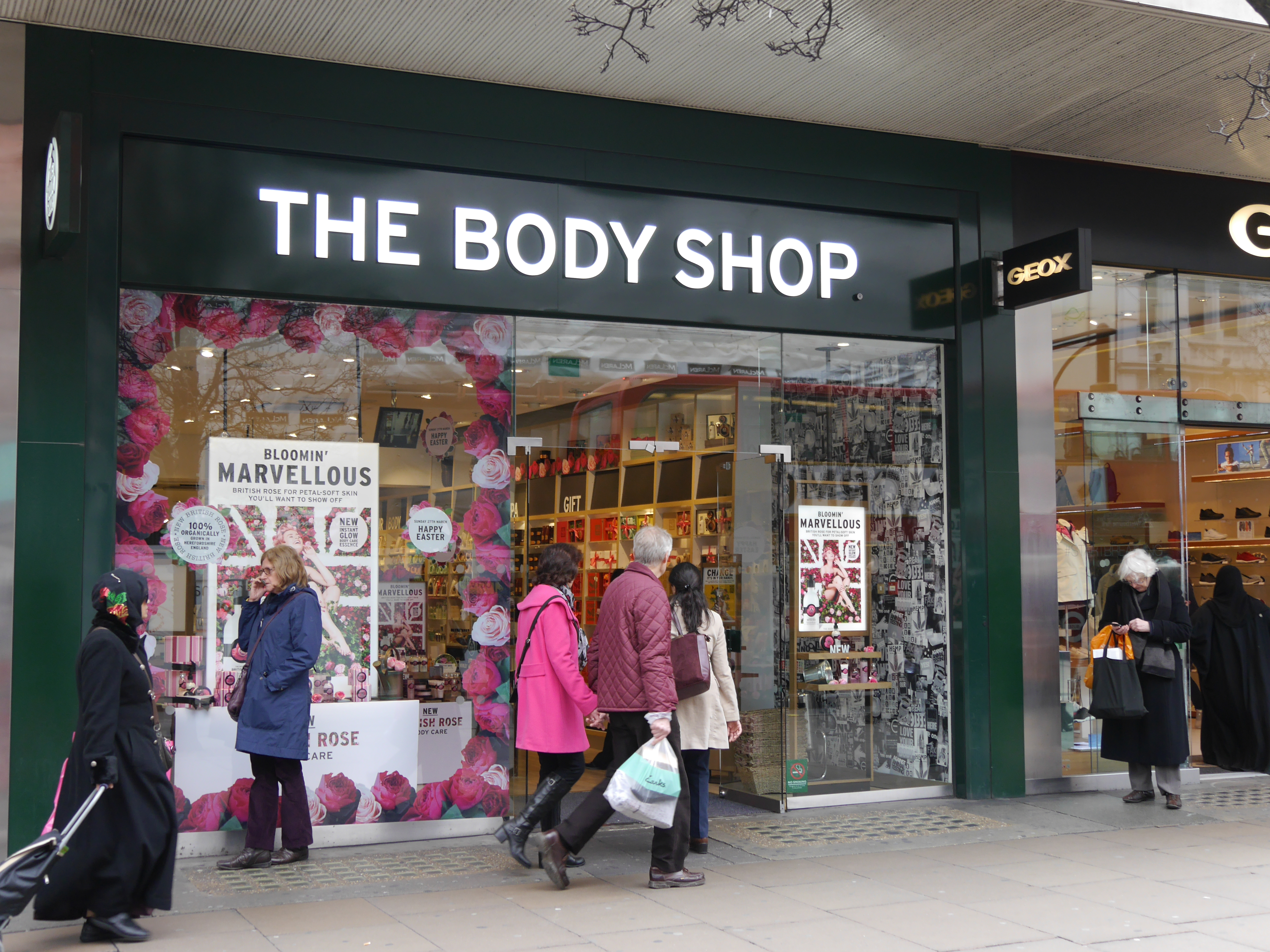
- The Body Shop on Oxford Street in London
- Trade name: The Body Shop
- Type: Subsidiary
- Industry: Cosmetics
- Founded: 27 March 1976; 50 years ago in Brighton, England
- Founder: Anita Roddick
- Fate: Administration, then purchased by Auréa Group in 2024
- Headquarters: Brighton, England
- Number of locations: 1,189+ (2025)
- Products: Skin care; cosmetics; fragrances
- Revenue: ▲ R$ 5.3 billion (2020)
- Number of employees: 10,000 (2017)
- Parent: L'Oréal (2006–2017); Natura & Co (2017–2023); Aurelius Group (2023–2024); Auréa Group (2024–present)
- Website: www.thebodyshop.com

The Body Shop International Limited (trading as the Body Shop) is a British cosmetics, skin care, and perfume company founded in 1976 by Anita Roddick, who opened her first store in Brighton, England. The company is now based in London Bridge and Littlehampton, West Sussex, and is currently owned by Auréa Group.

The Body Shop operated under the French cosmetics company L'Oréal between 2006 and 2017. In September 2017, L'Oréal sold it to Brazil's Natura & Co for £880 million. In November 2023, Natura sold it to Aurelius.

On 13 February 2024, it was announced that Aurelius had put the UK business of the Body Shop into administration, that the chain would close up to half of its 198 stores in the UK, and that the number of staff at the chain's head office would be reduced by 40%. In March 2024, the company announced that it would shutter its operations in the United States and reorganise in Canada under bankruptcy protection. The Body Shop was acquired by Auréa Group in September 2024.

== History ==
Anita Roddick opened the Body Shop, a health and beauty store, in her hometown of Brighton, UK, in 1976. Her motivation was to "make a living for herself and her two daughters while her husband was away travelling".

The business's original vision was to sell products with ethically sourced, cruelty-free, and natural ingredients. None of Roddick's products were tested on animals, and the ingredients were sourced directly from producers.

The store began trading with just 25 products. Roddick had purchased urine-sample bottles from a nearby hospital to sell her products in but did not have enough of them, creating the business's refillable bottles policy. Labels were handwritten, and Roddick did not advertise explicitly, using the local press instead.

In the late 1970s, Roddick's partner, Gordon, returned to Brighton from America and suggested the business foster growth through franchising. By 1984, the company had 138 stores, 87 of which were outside the UK. By 1994, 89% of the business's locations were franchises.

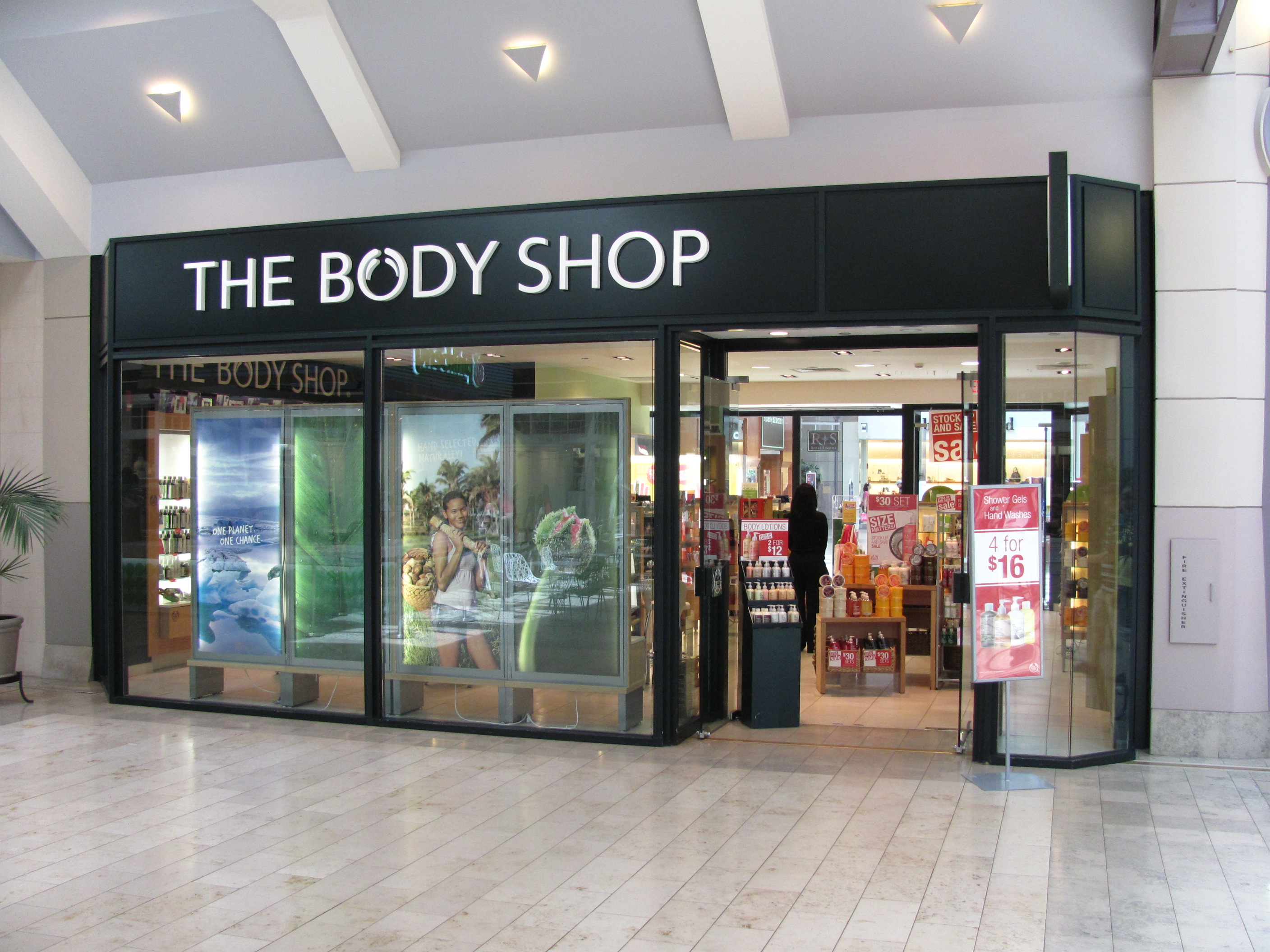
The Body Shop in the Prudential Center in Boston

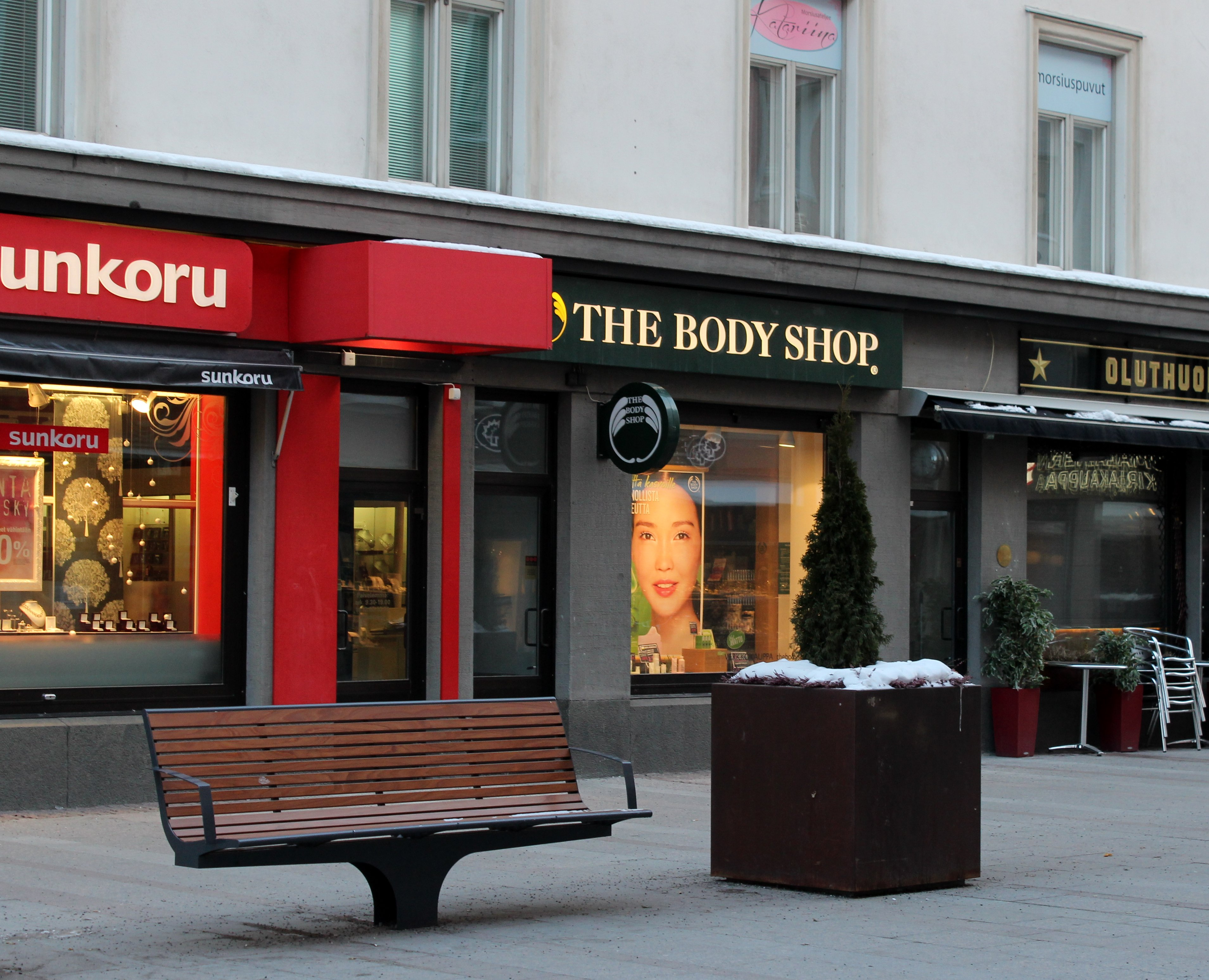
The Body Shop at Rotuaari in Oulu, Finland

The company went public in April 1984 and was floated on London's Unlisted Securities Market, opening at a price of 95p, with the Roddicks keeping 27.6% of shares in the company and Anita continuing as managing director so as to retain control of the company's direction. After it obtained a full listing on the London Stock Exchange, share prices in the company increased dramatically, rising 10,944 percent in the first eight years.

In 1987, Roddick paid the owners of the original Body Shop in the US, Peggy Short and Jane Saunders, US$3.5 million for the exclusive rights to the brand name. The US company became Body Time in 1992; it closed in 2018.

In 1991, the Body Shop sued Bath & Body Works for allegedly copying its marketing, reaching a confidential out-of-court settlement.

Throughout the 1980s and 1990s, the company joined a number of campaigns related to social responsibility and environmental issues. These included a "Trade Not Aid" campaign in 1987, wherein the company sourced some of its ingredients directly from the native communities they originated from. The company also made alliances with Greenpeace and Amnesty International.

=== 1994 Business Ethics exposé ===
In September 1994, Business Ethics magazine published an investigative article entitled "Shattered Image: Is The Body Shop Too Good to Be True?", written by Jon Entine, on the company's practices. Entine reported that Anita Roddick had copied the name, store design, marketing concept, and most product line ideas from the earlier American Body Shop.

=== 2000s and 2010s ===
In March 2006, the Body Shop agreed to a £652.3 million takeover by L'Oréal. The Roddicks made £130 million from the sale.

The takeover caused some media controversy, particularly surrounding L'Oréal's use of animal testing. Although L'Oréal itself ceased animal testing in 1989, the company had begun selling its products in China in 1997, where the law required cosmetics to be tested on animals before sale to the public. Roddick stated that she believed the takeover could allow her to be a "Trojan Horse" within the larger company, working through the Body Shop to improve its standards on animal testing and environmental issues.

In September 2007, Roddick died following a major brain haemorrhage.

In 2017, L'Oréal sold the Body Shop to Brazilian cosmetics company Natura for £880 million (€1 billion). At the time, the company was one of the world's largest cosmetics chains, with 3,200 stores and 17,000 employees in 66 countries.

The Body Shop received its B-Corp certification in 2019.

=== Aurelius takeover and Auréa Group ===
In November 2023, Natura sold the Body Shop to Aurelius, a German private equity group, for £207 million ($254.32 million). The deal came as part of Natura's downsizing strategy after its sale of Aesop to L'Oréal for $2.5 billion earlier in the year.

At the time, it was suggested that Aurelius had "grabbed itself a bargain" and Aurelius predicted rapid growth for the company. However, following the sale, Aurelius experienced financial challenges and lapses during its due diligence, resulting in the departure of its managing director, who had spearheaded the deal.

On 7 September 2024, the Body Shop's British business and all its trademarks were acquired by Auréa Group, a consortium led by Mike Jatania and Charles Denton, who became its executive chair and CEO, respectively.

=== Administration ===
==== United Kingdom ====
On 15 February 2024, Aurelius put the Body Shop's UK division into administration and hired the business advisory firm FRP Advisory as administrators to help the company through the procedure. This followed Aurelius' failure to secure a line of credit for the company after its takeover when HSBC withdrew a prior line of credit negotiated under Natura's ownership. In administration, it was reported that the UK division owed over £276 million to creditors, of which about £143 million was owed to other parts of the group. After restructuring, 82 UK stores were closed and 489 jobs were lost, with a further 329 jobs axed at the company's head office.

On 17 May 2024, FRP Advisory announced that the Body Shop's UK business and assets would be put up for auction after plans for a company voluntary arrangement fell through.

==== European Union ====
On 16 February 2024, just one day after the UK division went insolvent, the Body Shop Germany collapsed into administration and announced that all 60 stores were to be closed within the coming months. The same day, the Body Shop hired administrators for its Belgium, Ireland, Austria, Luxembourg, and France divisions, all of which were expected to be put into administration as early as the following week.

On 29 February 2024, the Body Shop's Belgian and Danish divisions were placed under administration, and it was announced that all stores in both countries would close. All of the Body Shop's Irish stores were closed by the end of February. In November 2024, the Body Shop Netherlands filed for bankruptcy.

As part of the shutdown, Alma24, a company controlled by Friedrich Trautwein, took control of the Body Shop's European entities along with those in Japan.

The Austrian division announced its insolvency on 13 January 2026, affecting 12 shops.

==== North America ====
On 1 March 2024, the Body Shop Canada filed for creditor protection and announced that it would cease online operations and close 33 locations out of 105. On the same day, the Body Shop USA closed all of its stores and ceased operations online. On 10 March, the Body Shop USA filed for Chapter 7 bankruptcy liquidation.

While profitable, the North American businesses had paid funds into the UK head office under cash pooling, which made their funds inaccessible to pay creditors, including suppliers, following the collapse of the UK entity.

In October 2025, the Body Shop announced their return to the United States, exclusively online, with the launch of a new website.

==== Oceania ====
On 22 January 2025, Body Shop New Zealand was placed into voluntary administration. While the chain's 16 stores remained open, Body Shop NZ ceased to accept loyalty points and reduced the use of gift card funds. All New Zealand stores were closed by April 2025. The Body Shop returned to New Zealand under a franchise agreement in November 2025.

== International operations ==
Africa & the Middle East
- Lebanon: 4
- Mauritius: 4
- Namibia: 3
- Nigeria: 1
- La Réunion: 1
- Saudi Arabia:
- South Africa: 52
- United Arab Emirates: 48
Americas
- Canada: 64
- Chile: 26
Asia & Oceania
- Australia: 90
- Azerbaijan: 6
- Bangladesh: 1
- Cambodia: 3
- Hong Kong: 26
- India: 197
- Indonesia: 14
- Japan: 54
- Kazakhstan: 1
- Malaysia: 70
- Maldives: 1
- New Zealand: 1
- Pakistan: 19
- Philippines: 48
- Singapore: 27
- South Korea: 3
- Sri Lanka: 4
- Taiwan: 20
- Vietnam: 29
Europe
- Albania: 2
- Andorra: 1
- Austria: 12
- Bulgaria: 8
- Croatia: 1
- Cyprus: 5
- Denmark: 3
- Estonia: 6
- Finland: 13
- Georgia: 13
- Germany: 27
- Greece: 28
- Hungary: 7
- Iceland: 2
- Kosovo: 3
- Latvia: 7
- Lithuania: 7
- Malta: 9
- Netherlands: 11
- North Macedonia: 1
- Norway: 6
- Portugal: 23
- Romania: 4
- Serbia: 8
- Slovenia: 1
- Spain: 39
- Sweden: 20
- Ukraine: 1

== Multilevel marketing channels ==
In addition to retail channels, products from the Body Shop were available through the "Body Shop at Home" multilevel marketing network, established in 1994. The multilevel marketing program was known as "the Body Shop Direct" in Britain and was first piloted in Australia under the "Body Shop at Home" name in Gippsland in 1997. Distributors (or consultants) could also recruit others to sell the products. In 1998, the Australian division was featured in Australian Financial Review for its motivational-based policy of funding unrelated courses for home distributors, such as French polishing and tarot reading.

The Body Shop at Home announced it would cease direct sales in February 2024 in the UK and Australia. It has since been replaced with an affiliate marketing program.

== Social activism ==
The Body Shop long held aims of social activism as part of its business practices. Roddick herself took on gradually more critical views of both business broadly and the cosmetics industry in particular, criticising what she considered the environmental insensitivity of the industry and its traditional views of beauty, and aimed to change standard corporate practices through her brand.

In 1997, Roddick launched a global campaign to raise self-esteem in women and against the media stereotyping of women. It focused on unreasonably thin models in the context of rising numbers of bulimia and anorexia.

=== Community Trade ===
Launched in 1987, the Body Shop's Community Trade programme was based on the practice of trading with communities in need and giving them a fair price for natural ingredients or handcrafts, including Brazil nut oil, sesame seed oil, honey, and shea butter. The first Community Trade product was a wooden roller, supplied by a small community in southern India, Teddy Exports, which continued to be a key Community Trade supplier.

Fair trade activists have criticised the programme: "The company...displayed claims...to pay fairer prices to the Third World poor but covered less than a fraction of 1 percent of its turnover", wrote Paul Vallely, the former chair of Traidcraft, in the obituary for Anita Roddick published in The Independent.

The Body Shop regularly invited employees and stakeholders to visit Community Trade suppliers to see the benefits that the programme has brought to communities and Body Shop products.

As part of the Community Trade programme, the Body Shop undertook periodic social audits of its sourcing activities through Ecocert.

A campaign by Christian Peacemaker Team protested the alleged role of the Body Shop in purchasing palm oil from Daabon, a third-party supplier in Colombia, who forcefully evicted 123 families from their land at Las Pavas on 14 July 2009. The Body Shop initially denied intentionally purchasing palm oil from the area but later dropped Daabon as a supplier after the company failed to provide proof that it was not involved in the land seizures.

=== Policy on animal testing ===
The Body Shop has campaigned to end animal testing in cosmetics alongside animal cruelty NGO Cruelty Free International (CFI) since 1989. The company's products are non-animal tested and are certified cruelty-free by CFI's Leaping Bunny logo.

In June 2017, the Body Shop and CFI launched Forever Against Animal Testing, its largest-ever campaign, aimed at banning animal testing in cosmetics everywhere and forever.

In October 2009, the Body Shop received a lifetime achievement award from the RSPCA in Britain, in recognition of its uncompromised policy, which ensures ingredients are not tested on animals by its suppliers.

In 2021, the Body Shop announced that all its products would be certified vegan by the Vegan Society as of the end of 2023. The process was completed in January 2024. However, the Body Shop quietly reneged on this promise in August 2025, when it contacted the Vegan Society, stating, "The Body Shop is bringing back a carefully considered number of products, including some with non-vegan ingredients, directly in response to our consumers' voices... the removal of non-vegan ingredients, such as beeswax and honey, impacted our customers' enjoyment of some of our products. The large majority of our products will continue to be vegan, all of our products will remain vegetarian, and all will continue to be certified by Cruelty Free International".

=== The Body Shop Foundation ===
The Roddicks founded the Body Shop Foundation in 1990, which supports global projects working in the areas of human and civil rights and environmental and animal protection. The foundation was formed to consolidate all the charitable donations made by the company. To date, it has donated over £24 million in grants. The foundation regularly gives gift-in-kind support to various projects and organisations, such as Children on the Edge.

In 2017, the Body Shop announced its new approach to corporate philanthropy, the World Bio-Bridges Mission (Re-Wilding the World), whose purpose is to increase biodiversity around the world while creating sustainable supply chains where possible.

== Products ==
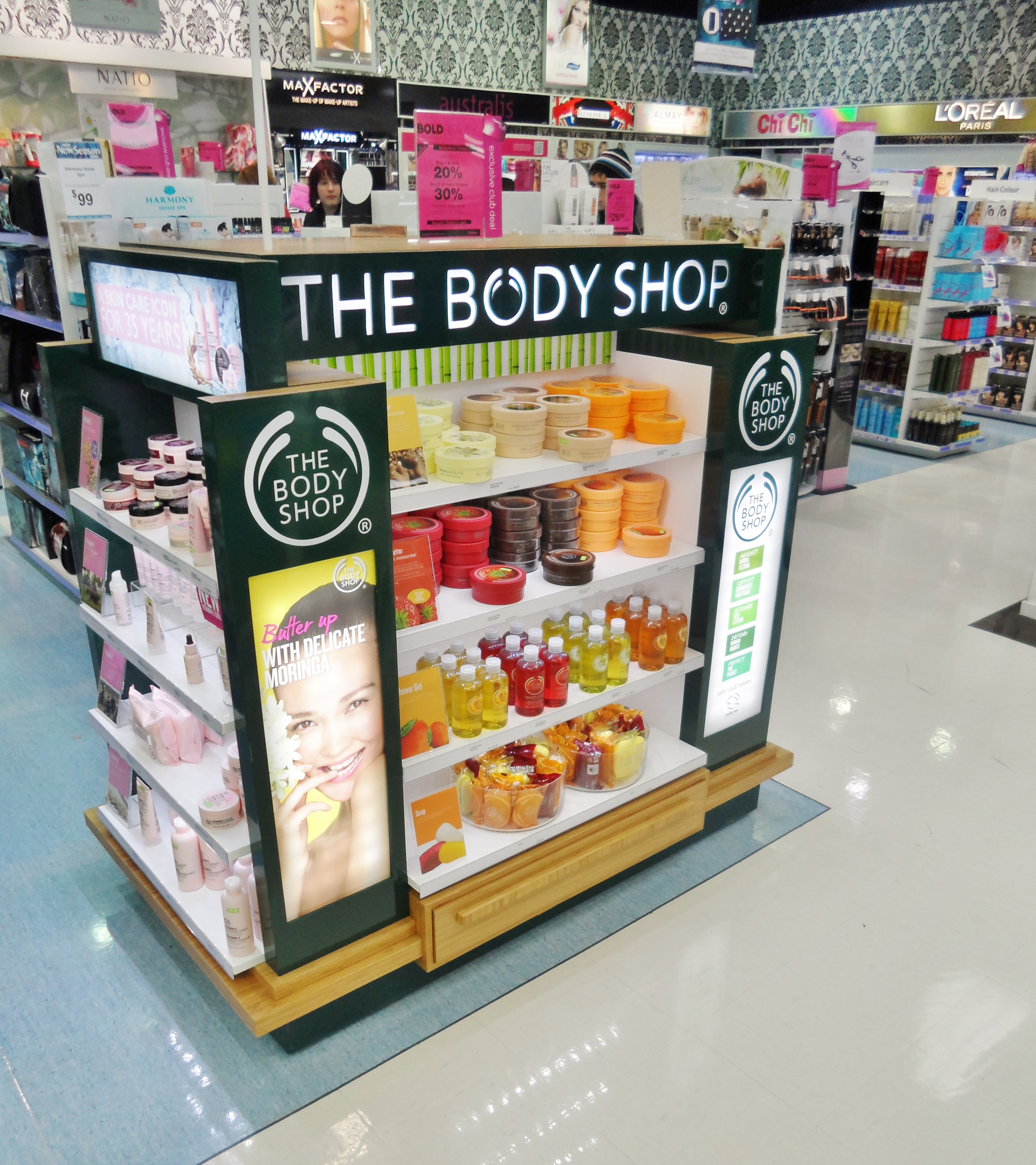
The Body Shop stand at New Zealand department store Farmers

The Body Shop carries a wide range of products for the body, face, hair, and home. The company claims its products are "inspired by nature" and feature ingredients such as marula oil and sesame seed oil, sourced through the Community Trade program.

Products include:

- Body butters (including Moringa, satsuma, strawberry, olive, shea, mango, and coconut)
- Body products such as body scrub, body butter, and bath lilies
- Cosmetics (including mascara, lipstick, lip gloss, eye shadow, and cotton rounds)
- Full skin care ranges (including tea tree, vitamin C, vitamin E, aloe vera, and seaweed)
- Men's skin care (including maca root and white musk)
- Hair care (including banana shampoo and banana conditioner)
- Fragrances (women's and men's)
- Bath products (including shower gels and solid soaps)
- Face masks (including sheet masks)
