= Brighton =

Seaside resort on the south coast of England

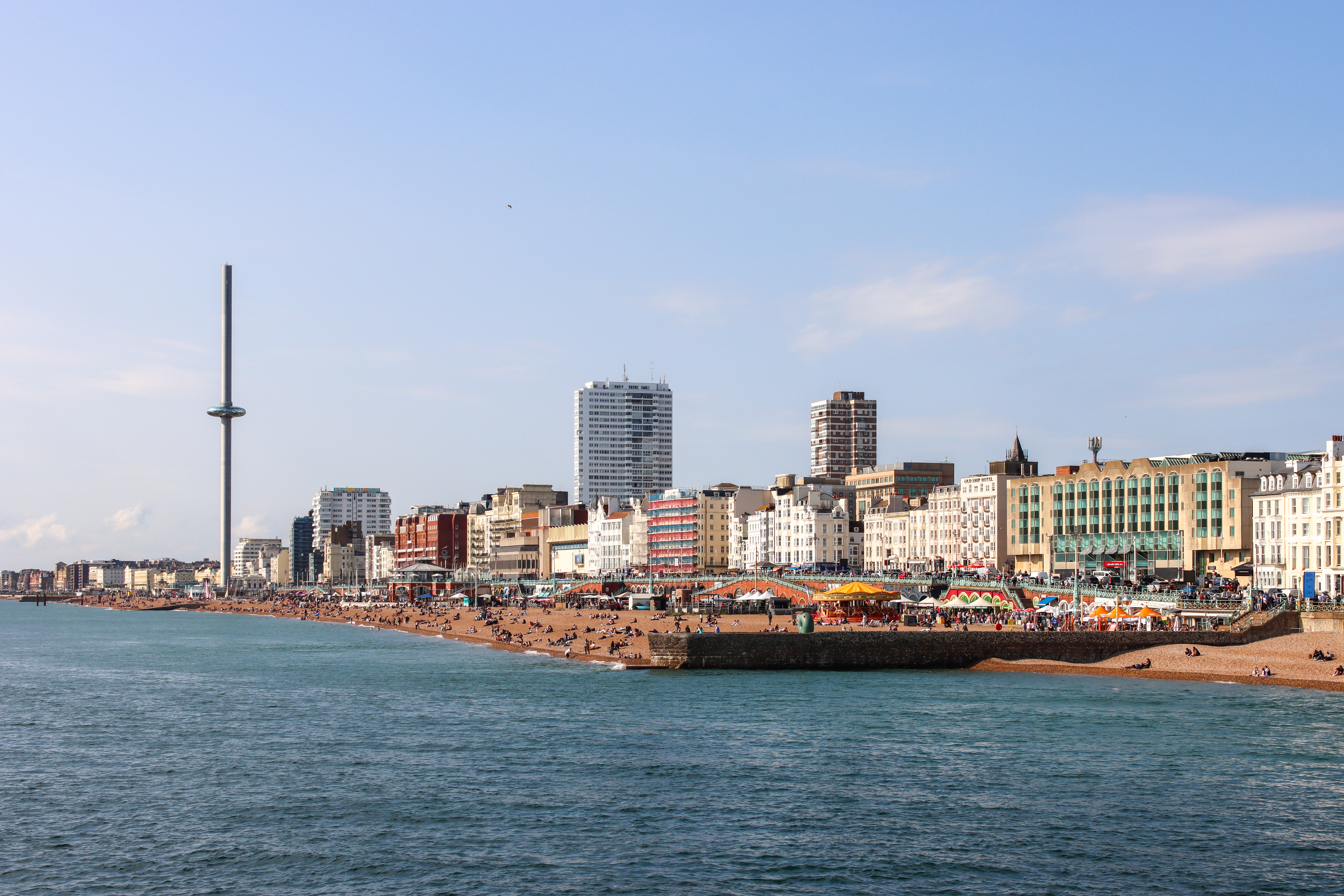
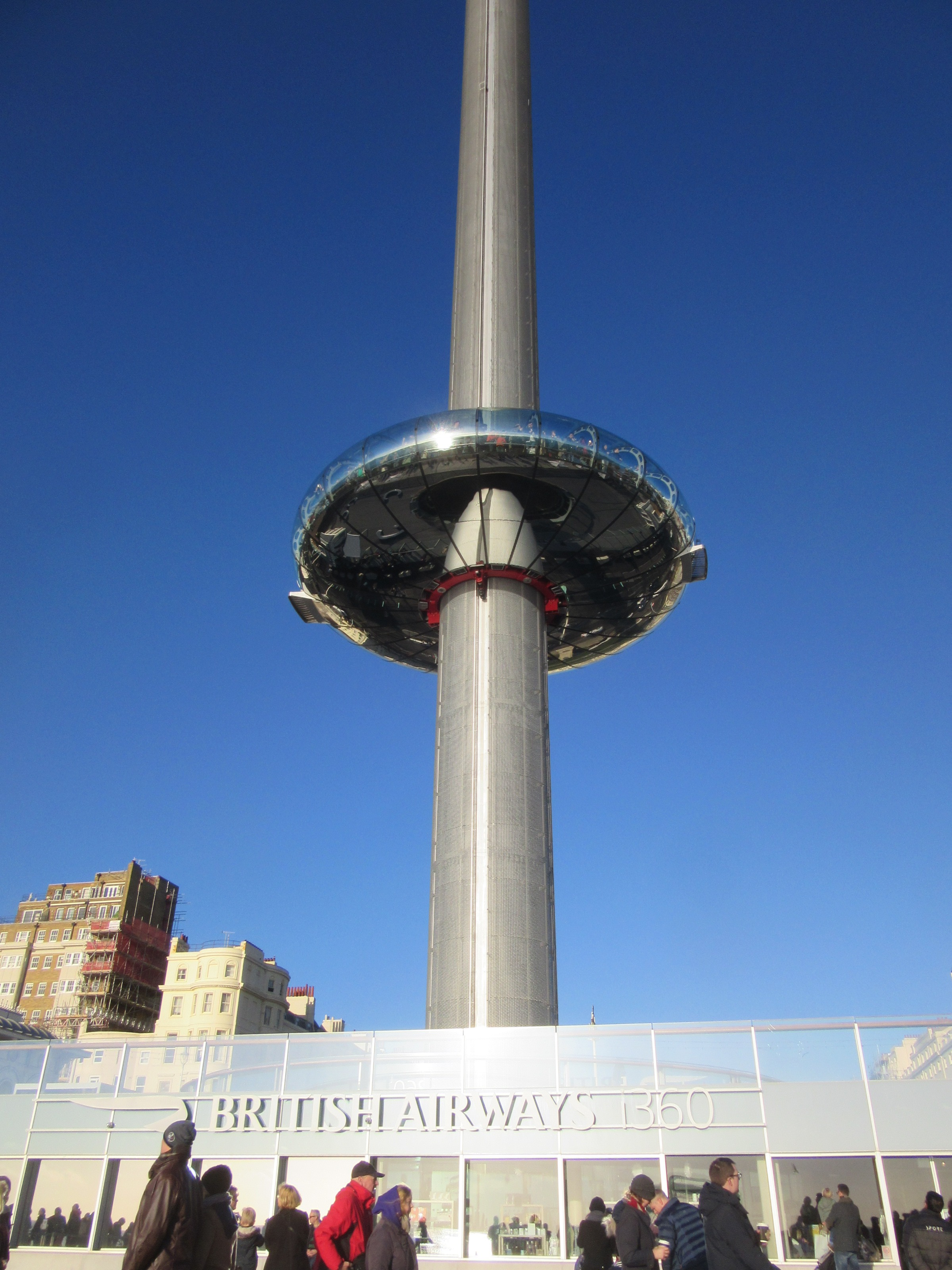
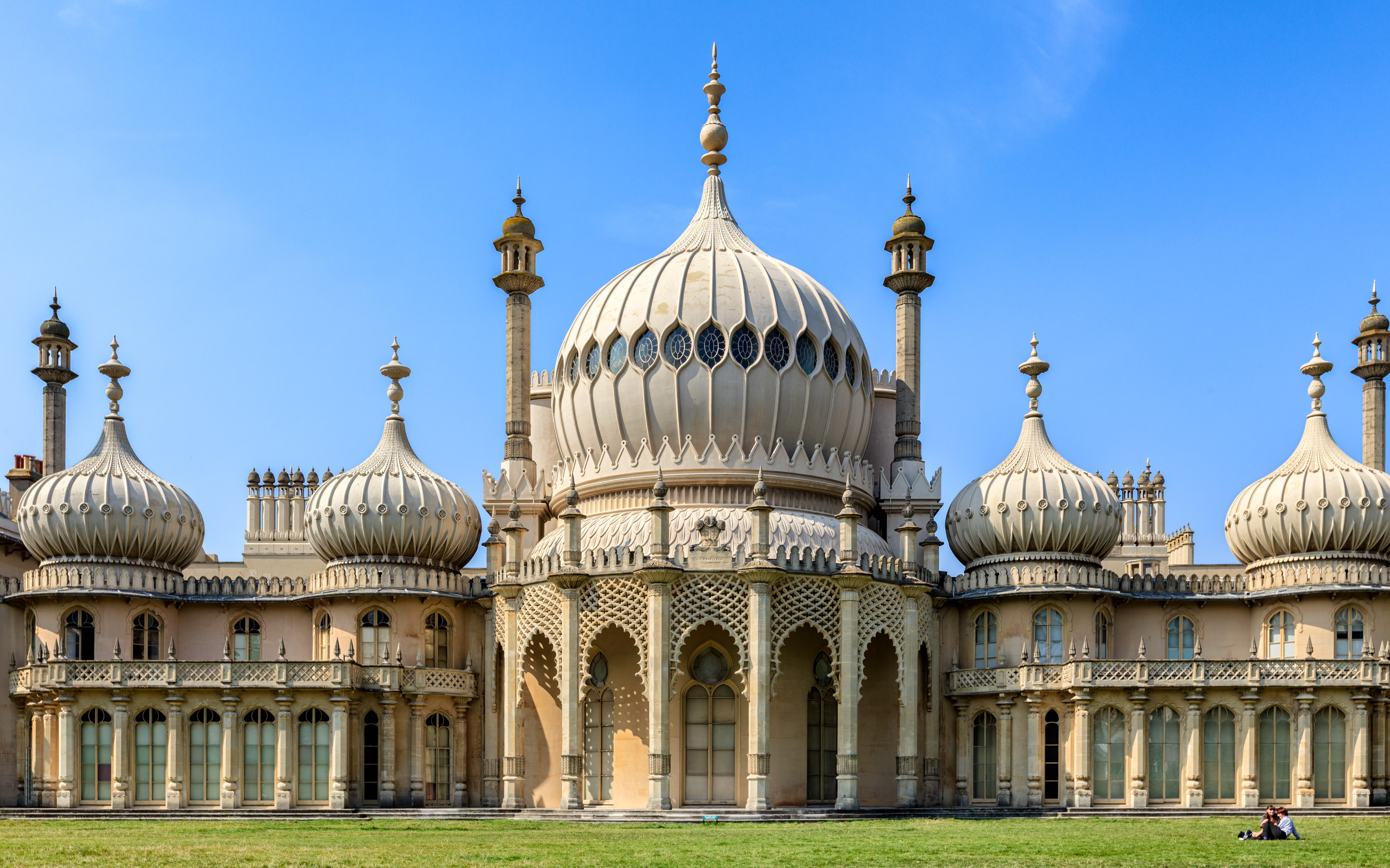
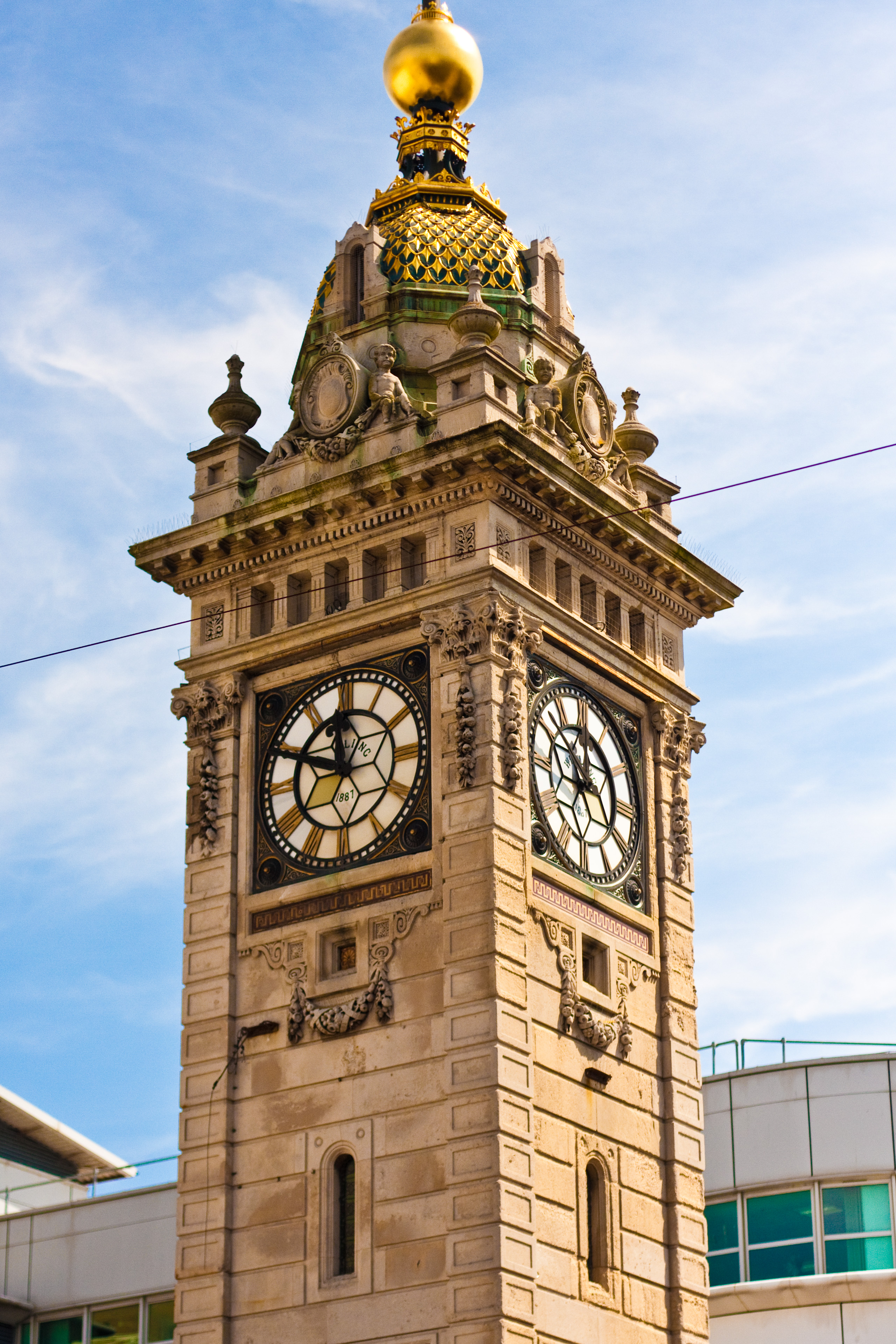
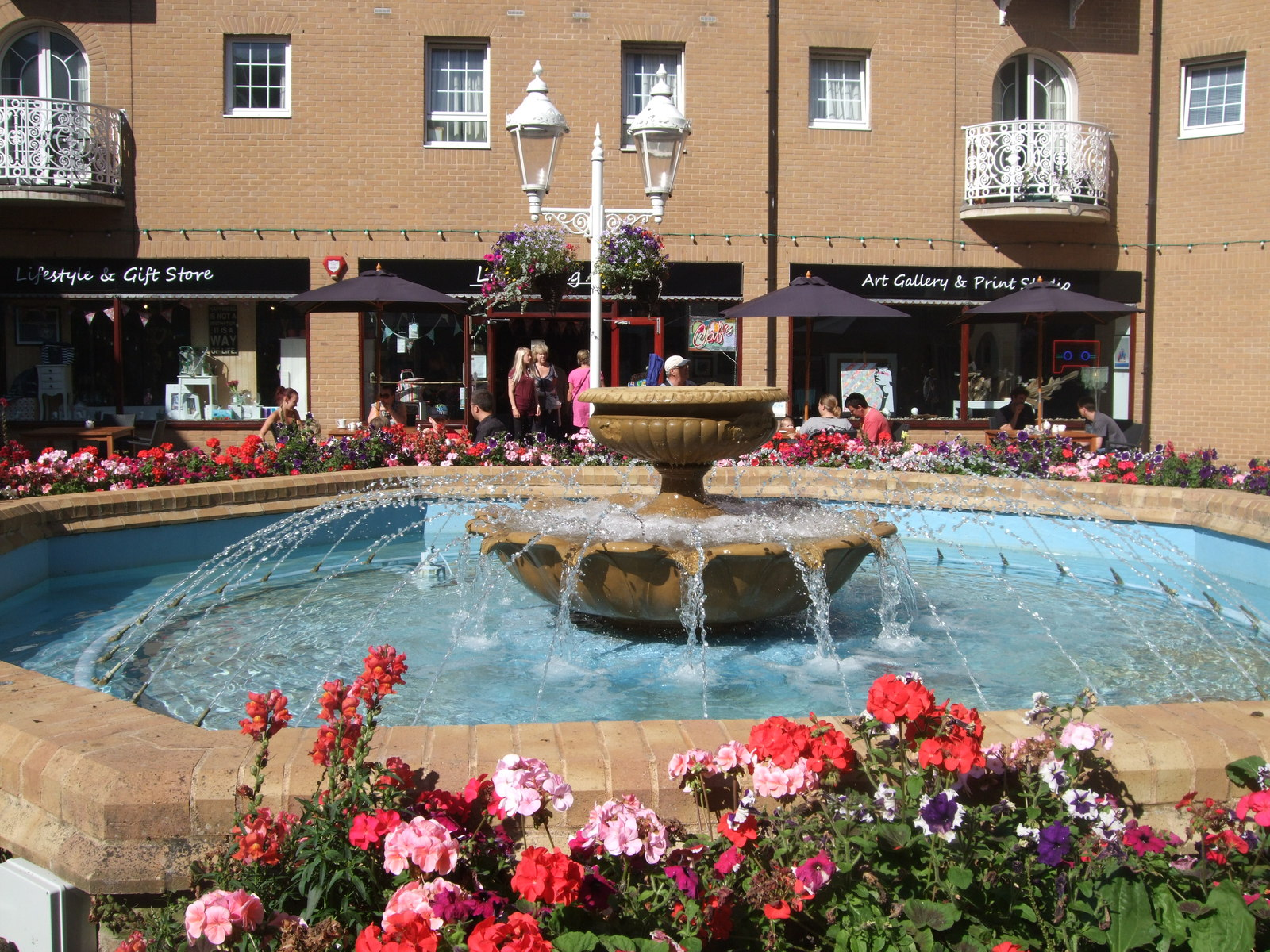
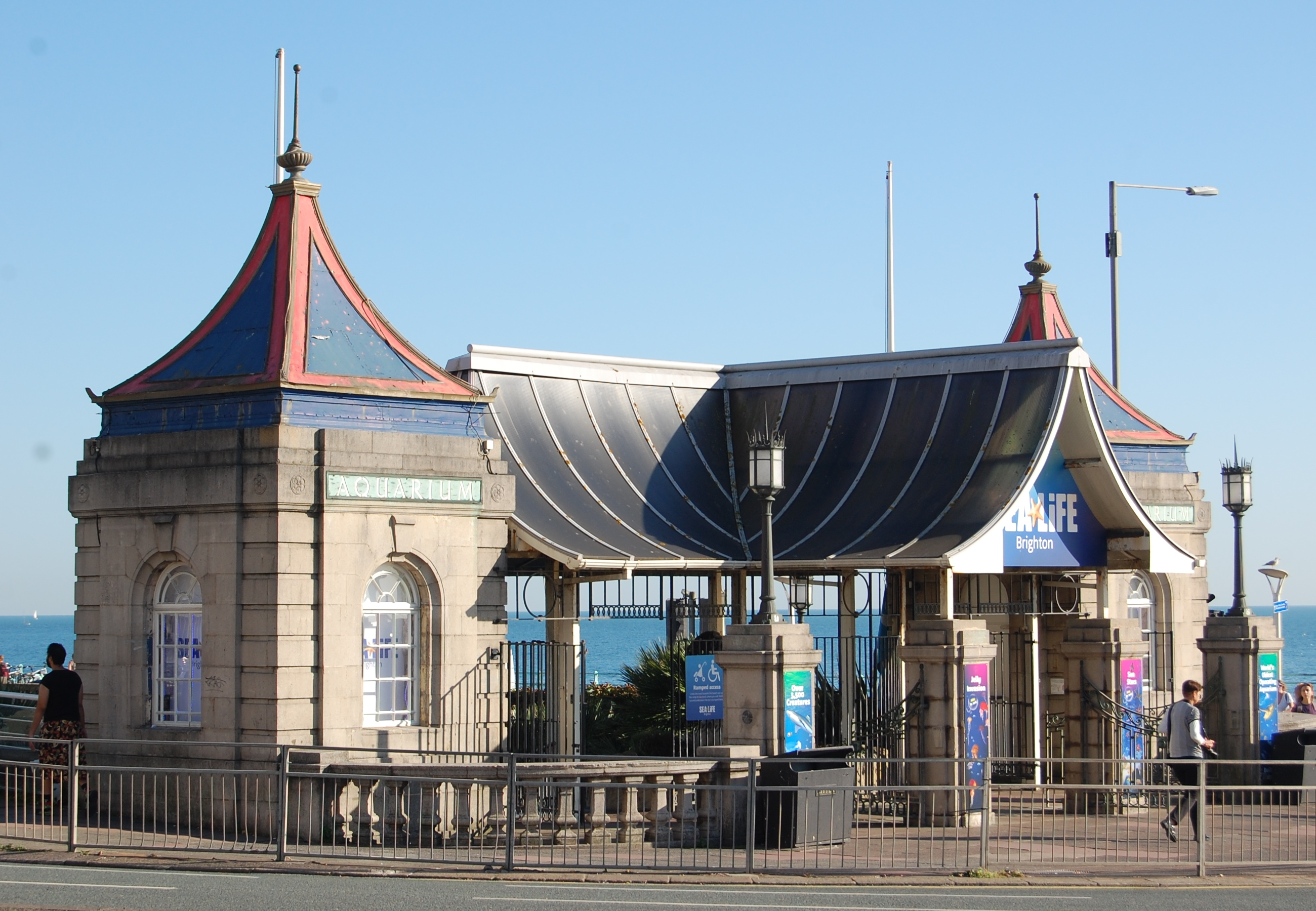
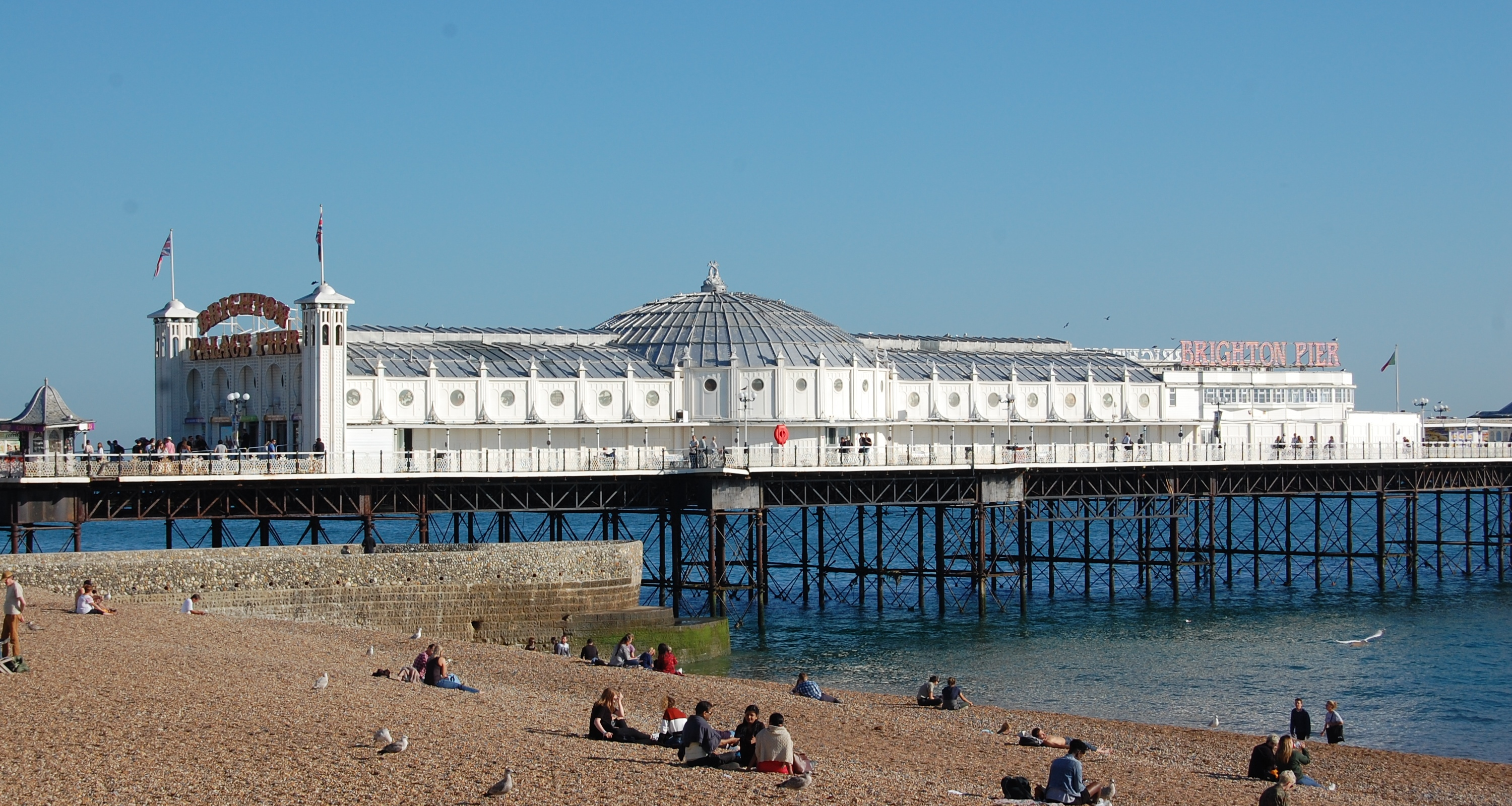
- Brighton skyline Brighton i360 Royal Pavilion Clock Tower Brighton Marina Sea Life Brighton Brighton Palace Pier

- Coat of arms

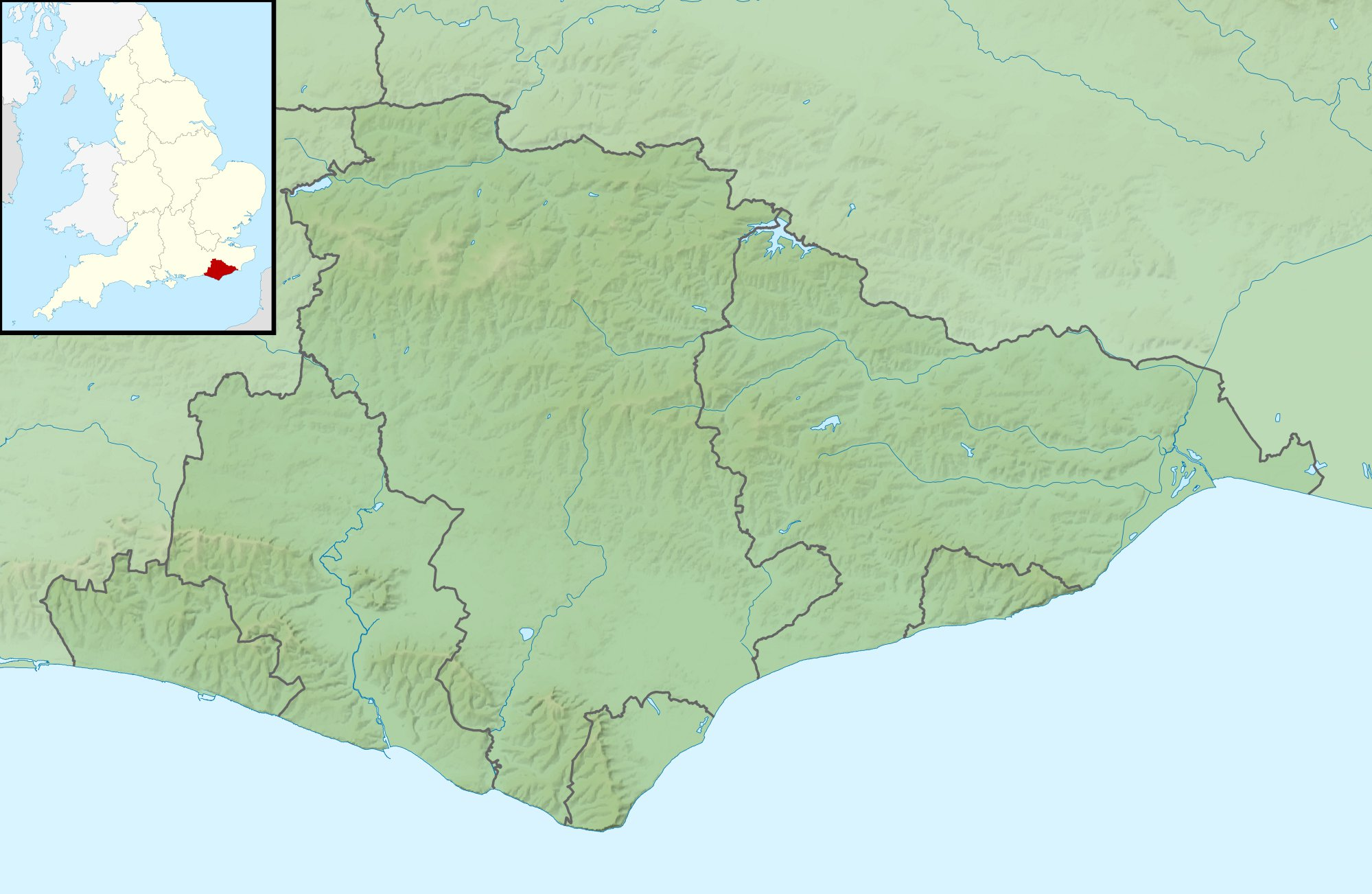
- Location within East Sussex Location within England Location within the United Kingdom Brighton (Europe)
- Coordinates: 50°49′15″N 00°08′15″W
- Sovereign state: United Kingdom
- Constituent country: England
- Region: South East England
- Ceremonial county: East Sussex
- Historic county: Sussex
- Unitary authority: Brighton and Hove
- Admin HQ: Hove Town Hall
- Town charter: 1313
- Incorporated: 1854
- Unitary authority: 1997

Government
  - Type: Unitary authority
  - Governing body: Brighton and Hove City Council
  - Leader: Bella Sankey (Labour)
  - Mayor: Amanda Grimshaw
  - MPs: Chris Ward (Labour, Brighton Kemptown and Peacehaven); Siân Berry (Green, Pavilion)

Area
  - Total: 32 sq mi (83 km^{2})

Population (2025)
  - Total: 284,170 (ranked 60th) (Brighton and Hove pop.)
  - Density: 8,890/sq mi (3,431/km^{2})
- Demonym: Brightonian
- Time zone: UTC0 (GMT)
  - Summer (DST): UTC+1 (BST)
- Postcode area: BN
- Area code: 01273
- ISO 3166-2: GB-BNH
- ONS code: 00ML (ONS); E06000043 (GSS)
- OS grid reference: TQ315065
- NUTS 3: UKJ21
- Police: Sussex
- Fire: East Sussex
- Ambulance: South East Coast
- Website: brighton-hove.gov.uk

Brighton (/ˈbraɪ.tən/, BRY-tən) is a seaside resort in the city of Brighton and Hove, in East Sussex, England, 47 miles (76 km) south of London. Archaeological evidence of settlement in the area dates back to the Bronze Age, Roman and Anglo-Saxon periods. The ancient settlement of "Brighthelmstone" was documented in the Domesday Book (1086). The town's importance grew in the Middle Ages as the Old Town developed, but it languished in the early modern period, affected by foreign attacks, storms, a suffering economy and a declining population. Brighton began to attract more visitors following improved road transport to London and becoming a boarding point for boats travelling to France. The town also developed in popularity as a health resort for sea bathing as a purported cure for illnesses.

In the Georgian era, Brighton developed as a highly fashionable seaside resort, encouraged by the patronage of the Prince Regent, later King George IV, who spent much time in the town and constructed the Royal Pavilion in the Regency era. Brighton continued to grow as a major centre of tourism following the arrival of the railways in 1841, becoming a popular destination for day-trippers from London. Many of the major attractions were built in the Victorian era, including the Grand Hotel, the Hilton Brighton Metropole, the Palace Pier and the West Pier. The town continued to grow into the 20th century, expanding to incorporate more areas into the town's boundaries before joining Hove to form the unitary authority of Brighton and Hove in 1997, which was granted city status in 2000. Today, Brighton and Hove district has a resident population of about 284,170 and the wider Brighton and Hove conurbation has a population of 474,485 (2011 census). (Note: For statistical purposes, Brighton and Hove are grouped together. The larger conurbation also includes Worthing and Littlehampton.)

Brighton's location has made it a popular destination for tourists, renowned for its diverse communities, shopping areas, large and vibrant cultural, music and arts scene, and its large LGBT population, leading to its recognition as the "unofficial gay capital of the UK". As of the 2021 census, 10.7% of the population of Brighton and Hove over the age of 18 identify as gay, lesbian or bisexual, the highest percentage in the entire UK. Brighton has been called the UK's "hippest city", as well as "the happiest place to live in the UK".

== Toponymy ==
The earliest attestation of Brighton's name is Bristelmestune, recorded in the Domesday Book. Although more than 40 variations have been documented, Brighthelmstone (or Brighthelmston) was the standard rendering between the 14th and 18th centuries.

Brighton was originally an informal shortened form, first seen in 1660; it gradually supplanted the longer name and was in general use from the late 18th century, although Brighthelmstone remained the town's official name until 1810. The name is of Anglo-Saxon origin. Most scholars believe that it derives from Beorthelm + tūn—the homestead of Beorthelm, a common Old English name associated with villages elsewhere in England. The tūn element is common in Sussex, especially on the coast, although it occurs infrequently in combination with a personal name. An alternative etymology taken from the Old English words for 'stony valley' is sometimes given but has less acceptance. Brighthelm gives its name to, among other things, a church, a pub in Brighton, some halls of residence at the University of Sussex. Writing in 1950, historian Antony Dale noted that unnamed antiquaries had suggested an Old English word brist or briz, meaning 'divided', could have contributed the first part of the historic name Brighthelmstone. The town was originally split in half by the Wellesbourne, a winterbourne which was culverted and buried in the 18th century.

Brighton has several nicknames. Poet Horace Smith called it "The Queen of Watering Places", and "Old Ocean's Bauble". Novelist William Makepeace Thackeray referred to "Doctor Brighton", calling the town "one of the best of Physicians". "London-by-the-Sea" is well-known, reflecting Brighton's popularity with Londoners as a day-trip resort, a commuter dormitory and a desirable destination for those wanting to move out of the metropolis. "The Queen of Slaughtering Places", a pun on Smith's description, became popular when the Brighton trunk murders came to the public's attention in the 1930s. The mid-19th-century nickname "School Town" referred to the remarkable number of boarding, charity and church schools in the town at the time.

== History ==
The first settlement in the Brighton area was Whitehawk Camp, a Neolithic encampment on Whitehawk Hill which has been dated to between 3500 BC and 2700 BC. It is one of six causewayed enclosures in Sussex. Archaeologists have only partially explored it, but have found numerous burial mounds, tools and bones, suggesting it was a place of some importance. There was also a Bronze Age settlement at Coldean. Brythonic Celts arrived in Britain in the 7th century BC, and an important Brythonic settlement existed at Hollingbury Castle on Hollingbury Hill. This Celtic Iron Age encampment dates from the 3rd or 2nd century BC and is circumscribed by substantial earthwork outer walls with a diameter of c. 1,000 ft (300 m). Cissbury Ring, roughly 10 mi (16 km) from Hollingbury, is suggested to have been the tribal "capital".

Later, there was a Roman villa at Preston Village, a Roman road from London ran nearby, and much physical evidence of Roman occupation has been discovered locally. From the 1st century AD, the Romans built a number of villas in Brighton and Romano-British Brythonic Celts formed farming settlements in the area. After the Romans left in the early 4th century AD, the Brighton area returned to the control of the native Celts. Anglo-Saxons then invaded in the late 5th century AD, and the region became part of the Kingdom of Sussex, founded in 477 AD by king Ælle.

Anthony Seldon identified five phases of development in pre-20th century Brighton. The village of Bristelmestune was founded by these Anglo-Saxon invaders, probably in the early Saxon period. They were attracted by the easy access for boats, sheltered areas of raised land for building and better conditions compared to the damp, cold and misty Weald to the north. By the time of the Domesday survey in 1086 it was a fishing and agricultural settlement, a rent of 4,000 herring was established, and its population was about 400. By the 14th century there was a parish church, a market and rudimentary law enforcement (the first town constable was elected in 1285). Sacked and burnt by French invaders in the early 16th century—the earliest depiction of Brighton, a painting of c. 1520, shows Admiral Pregent de Bidoux's attack of June 1514—the town recovered strongly based on a thriving mackerel-fishing industry. The grid of streets in the Old Town (the present Lanes area) were well developed and the town grew quickly: the population rose from c. 1,500 in 1600 to c. 4,000 in the 1640s. By that time Brighton was Sussex's most populous and important town.

Over the next few decades, though, events severely affected its local and national standing, such that by 1730 "it was a forlorn town decidedly down on its luck". More foreign attacks, storms (especially the devastating Great Storm of 1703), a declining fishing industry, and the emergence of nearby Shoreham as a significant port caused its economy to suffer. By 1708 other parishes in Sussex were charged rates to alleviate poverty in Brighton, and Daniel Defoe wrote that the expected £8,000 cost of providing sea defences was "more than the whole town was worth". The population declined to 2,000 in the early 18th century.

From the 1730s, Brighton entered its second phase of development—one which brought a rapid improvement in its fortunes. The contemporary fad for drinking and bathing in seawater as a purported cure for illnesses was enthusiastically encouraged by Richard Russell from nearby Lewes. He sent many patients to "take the cure" in the sea at Brighton, published a popular treatise (Note: De Tabe Glandulari, sive, De usu aquæ marinæ in morbis glandularum dissertatio (1750); translated into English in 1753 as Glandular Diseases, or a Dissertation on the Use of Sea Water in the Affections of the Glands.) on the subject, and moved to the town soon afterwards (the Royal Albion, one of Brighton's early hotels, occupies the site of his house). Others were already visiting the town for recreational purposes before Russell became famous, and his actions coincided with other developments which made Brighton more attractive to visitors. From the 1760s it was a boarding point for boats travelling to France; road transport to London was improved when the main road via Crawley was turnpiked in 1770; and spas and indoor baths were opened by other entrepreneurial physicians such as Sake Dean Mahomed and Anthony Relhan (who also wrote the town's first guidebook).

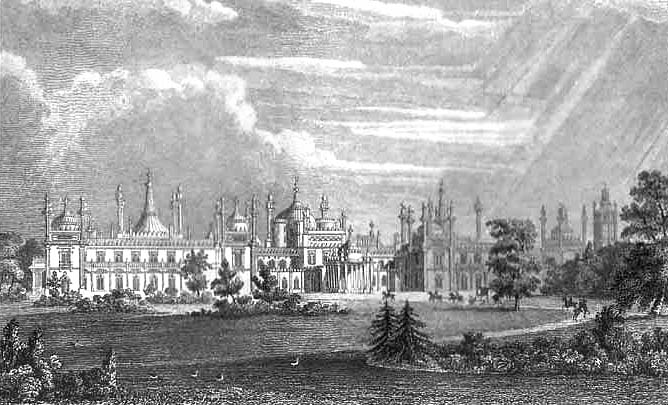
Royal Pavilion by Augustus Pugin, 1824

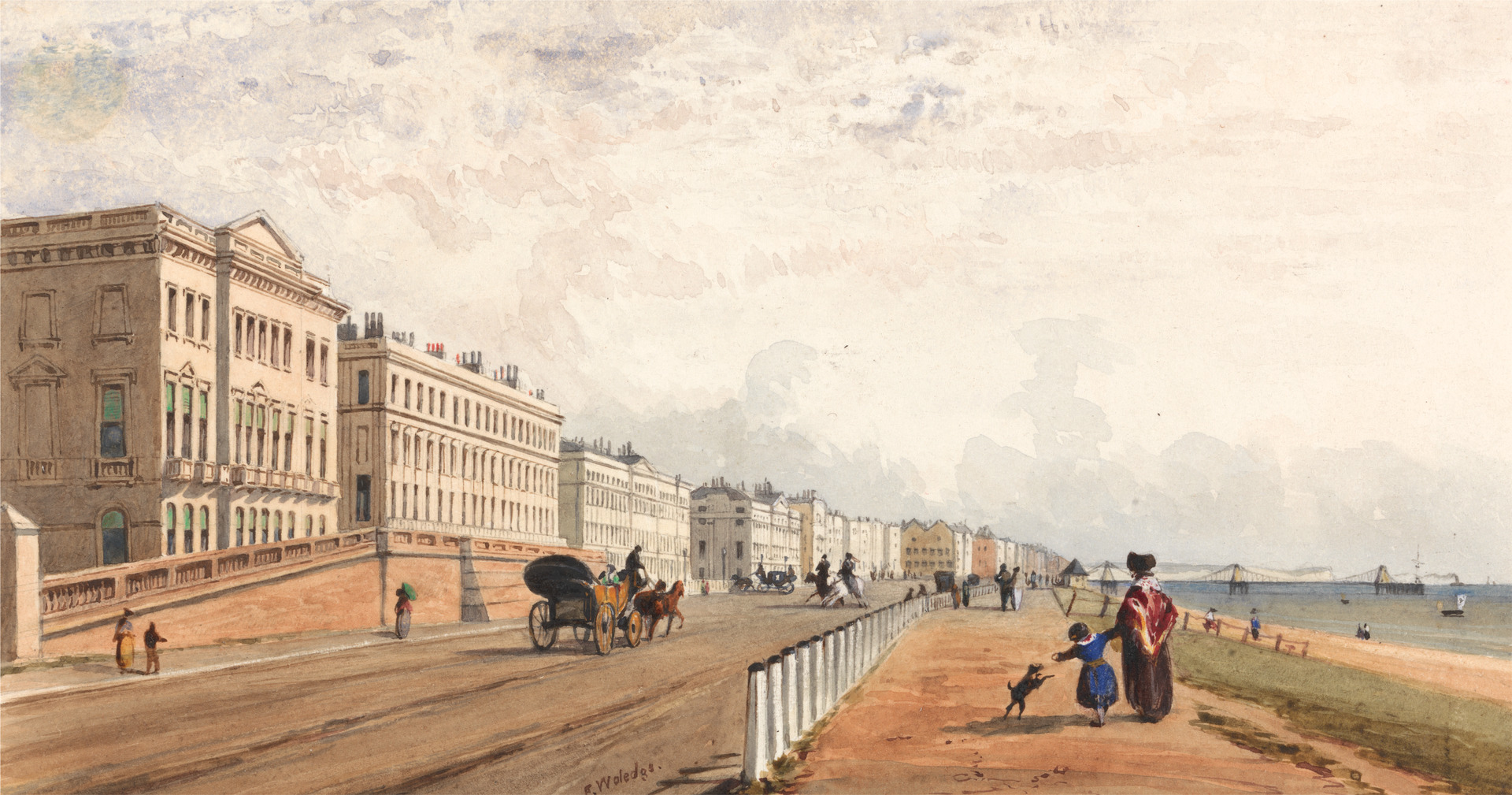
Brighton, The Front and the Chain Pier Seen in the Distance by Frederick William Woledge, 1840

From 1780, the development of the Georgian terraces had started and the fishing village developed as the fashionable resort of Brighton. The growth of the town was further encouraged by the patronage of the Prince Regent (later King George IV) after his first visit in 1783. He spent much of his leisure time in the town and constructed the Royal Pavilion during the early part of his Regency. In this period the modern form of the name Brighton came into common use. A permanent military presence was established in the city with the completion of Preston Barracks in 1793. It was rebuilt in 1830.

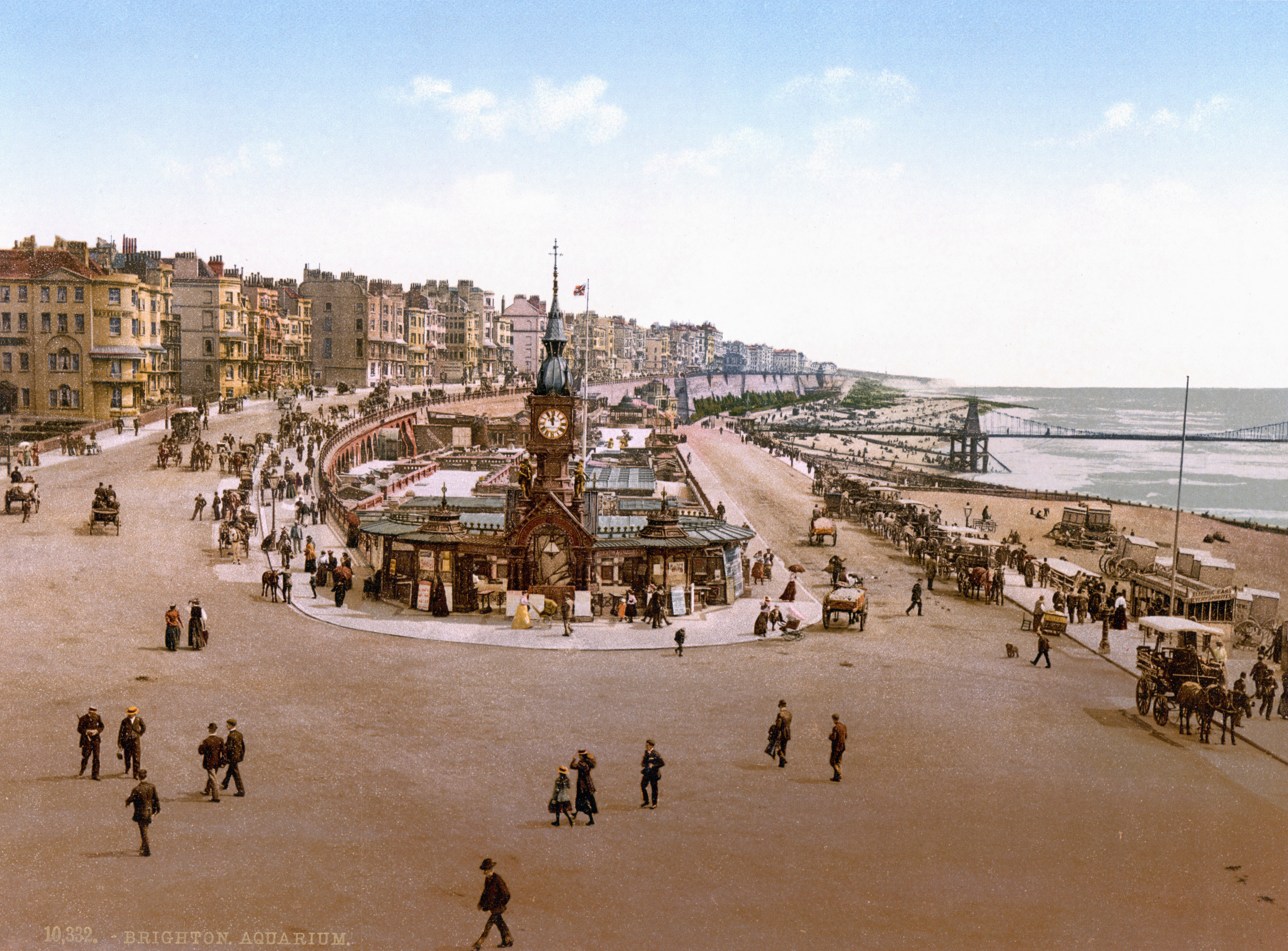
Photochrom of Brighton aquarium, 1890–1900

The population increased rapidly throughout the 19th century from 7,339 in 1801 to 46,661 in 1841, and by 1901 the population had reached more than 120,000. The arrival of the London and Brighton Railway in 1841 brought Brighton within the reach of day-trippers from London. Many of the major attractions were built during the Victorian era, such as the Grand Hotel (1864), the West Pier (1866), and the Palace Pier (1899). Prior to either of these structures, the famous Royal Suspension Chain Pier was built, to the designs of Captain Samuel Brown. It lasted from 1823 to 1896 and is featured in paintings by both Turner and Constable.

Due to the boundary changes, the land area of Brighton expanded from 1,640 acres (7 km^{2}) in 1854 to 14,347 acres (58 km^{2}) in 1952. New housing estates were established in the acquired areas, including Moulsecoomb, Bevendean, Coldean and Whitehawk. The major expansion of 1928 also incorporated the villages of Patcham, Ovingdean and Rottingdean, and much council housing was built in parts of Woodingdean after the Second World War. By the 1970s, the town had acquired a reputation as a retirement destination, with an elderly population. However, this was reversed in the 1990s, as Brighton regained the fashionable status it held in the 18th and 19th centuries.

In 1997, the town of Brighton and its neighbouring town Hove were joined to form the unitary authority of Brighton and Hove, which was granted city status by Queen Elizabeth II as part of the millennium celebrations in 2000.

== Demography ==
As of 2017, the Brighton and Hove district, of which Brighton is the largest area, has an estimated resident population of 284,170 residents. It is ranked the 60th most populous district in England. Compared to the national average, Brighton has fewer children and old residents but a large proportion of adults aged 20–44.

Brighton has long had an LGBT-friendly history. In a 2014 estimate, 11–15 per cent of the city's population aged 16 or over is thought to be lesbian, gay or bisexual. The city also had the highest percentage of same-sex households in the UK in 2004 and the largest number of civil partnership registrations outside London in 2013. The 2021 census, which was the first to measure sexual orientation, recorded that 11 per cent of people identified as lesbian, gay, or bisexual; higher than the national and regional averages, which were 3 per cent.

=== Religion ===
Brighton is identified as one of the least religious places in the UK. The 2021 census for Brighton and Hove reported that 55 per cent of the population profess no religion – far higher than the national average of 37 per cent. Only three other local authorities have a higher rate of no religion: Caerphilly, Blaenau Gwent and Rhondda Cynon Taf. This is a trend that continues from the 2011 census. Brighton has been described as the UK's most "Godless" city.

The largest religion is Christianity, with 30.9 per cent reporting an affiliation. The second-largest religion is Islam, with 3.1 per cent.

As part of the Jedi census phenomenon in 2001, 2.6 per cent claimed their religion was 'Jedi Knight', the largest percentage in the country.

=== Homelessness ===
In December 2021, new data released by Shelter, revealed that "one in 78 people in Brighton and Hove are homeless". The report also records the city as having the third highest rate of homelessness in England, with London claiming the top spot followed by Luton. In a previous charity report issued in November 2016, three areas in Brighton & Hove, East Brighton, Queen's Park, and Moulsecoomb & Bevendean ranked in the top ten per cent nationally for deprivation.

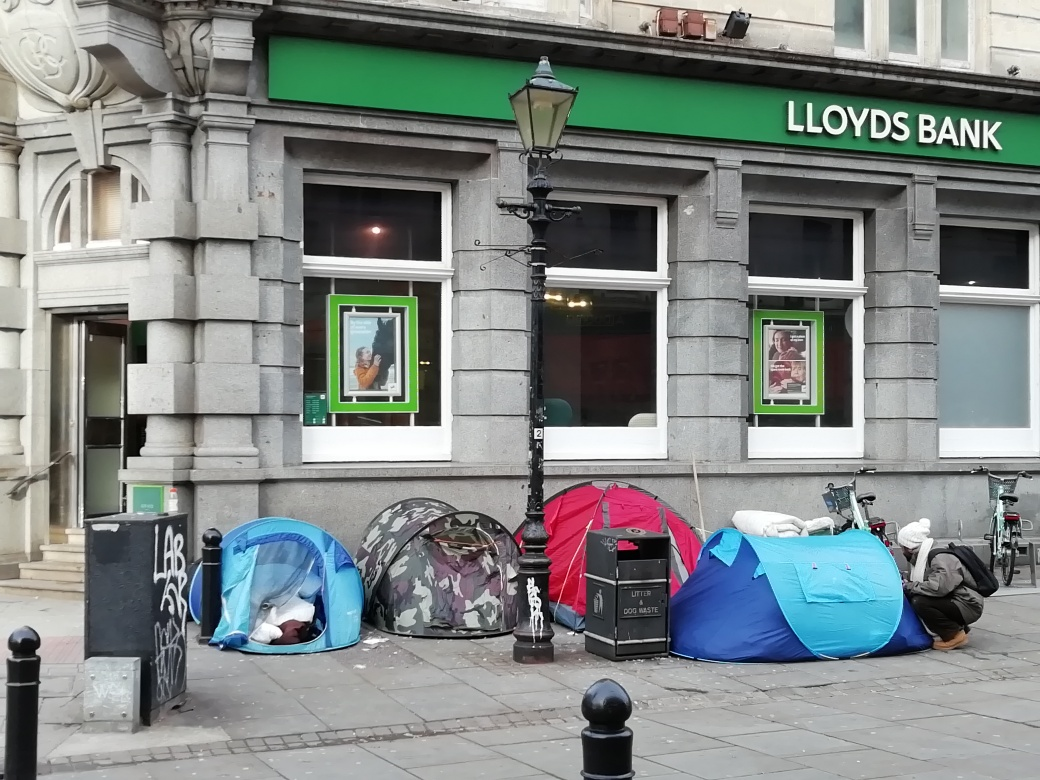
Rough sleepers' tents in Brighton's Castle Square

Although deprivation in Brighton is distributed across the city, it is more concentrated in some areas. The highest concentration is in the Whitehawk, Moulsecoomb, and Hollingbury areas but is also found around the St. James's Street and Eastern Road areas. A 2015 government statistic showed that the area around Brighton's Palace Pier roundabout and to the east towards St James's Street in Kemptown is the seventh-worst living environment in England. On 19 January 2017, Brighton council announced they were looking at certain initiatives to try to alleviate some of the increasing homelessness seen on Brighton's streets and were hoping to open the first in-house temporary housing for homeless people in the city. Homelessness figures released by Crisis in December 2018 reported a record high in the UK, with figures in Sussex, including Brighton and Hove, reported as being "high".

At a meeting of the full B&H Council on 25 March 2021, Brighton and Hove became the first UK City to adopt the Homeless Bill of Rights. The bill was passed by 31 votes to 11, with 7 abstentions.

In 2025, analysis by Shelter indicated that there were 3,580 people experiencing homelessness at the end of June 2024 in Brighton & Hove. Most (3,528) were living in temporary accommodation and a further 52 were sleeping rough. There were 1,411 homeless children aged 0-17 in the city, almost 40% of the total homeless population.

== Geography ==
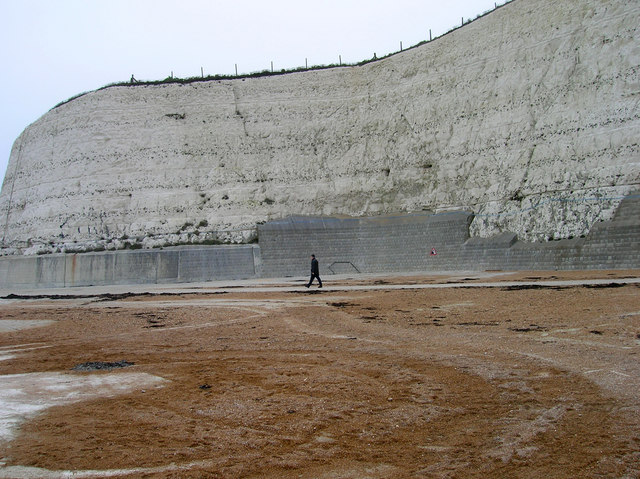
To the east of Brighton, chalk cliffs protected by a sea-wall rise from the beach.

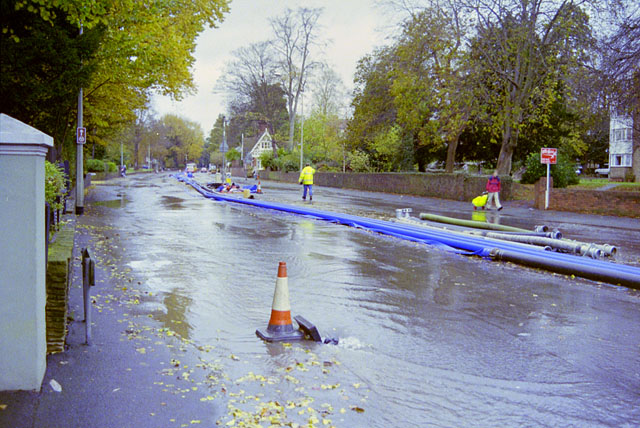
The underground Wellesbourne can rise to the surface during heavy rain, as in November 2000, when it flooded the London Road in Preston village.

Brighton lies between the South Downs and the English Channel to the north and south, respectively. The Sussex coast forms a wide, shallow bay between the headlands of Selsey Bill and Beachy Head; Brighton developed near the centre of this bay around a seasonal river, the Wellesbourne (or Whalesbone), which flowed from the South Downs above Patcham. This emptied into the English Channel at the beach near the East Cliff, forming "the natural drainage point for Brighton".

Behind the estuary was a stagnant pond called the Pool or Poole, so named since the medieval era. (Note: The name was documented as Poole in 1296 and 1497.) This was built over with houses and shops from 1793, when the Wellesbourne was culverted to prevent flooding, and only the name of the road (Pool Valley, originally Pool Lane) marks its site. One original house survives from the time of the pool's enclosure. Behind Pool Valley is Old Steine (historically The Steyne), originally a flat and marshy area where fishermen dried their nets. The Wellesbourne occasionally reappears during times of prolonged heavy rain; author Mark Antony Lower referred to an early 19th-century drawing of the Royal Pavilion showing "quite a pool of water across the Steyne".

Despite 16th-century writer Andrew Boorde's claim that "Bryght-Hempston [is] among the noble ports and havens of the realm", Brighton never developed as a significant port: rather, it was considered as part of Shoreham. Nevertheless, the descriptions "Port of Brighthelmston" or "Port of Brighton" were sometimes used between the 14th and 19th centuries, as for example in 1766 when its notional limits were defined for customs purposes.

The East Cliff runs for several miles from Pool Valley towards Rottingdean and Saltdean, reaching 24 m (80 ft) above sea level. The soil beneath it, a mixture of alluvium and clay with some flint and chalk rubble, has experienced erosion for many years. The cliff itself, like the rest of Brighton's soil, is chalk. Below this are thin layers of Upper and Lower Greensand separated by a thicker band of Gault clay. The land slopes upwards gradually from south to north towards the top of the Downs.

Main transport links developed along the floor of the Wellesbourne valley, from which the land climbs steeply—particularly on the east side. The earliest settlement was by the beach at the bottom of the valley, which was partly protected from erosion by an underwater sandbar. Changes in sea level affected the foreshore several times: 40 acres (16 ha) disappeared in the first half of the 14th century, and the Great Storm of 1703 caused widespread destruction. The first sea defences were erected in 1723, and a century later a long sea wall was built.

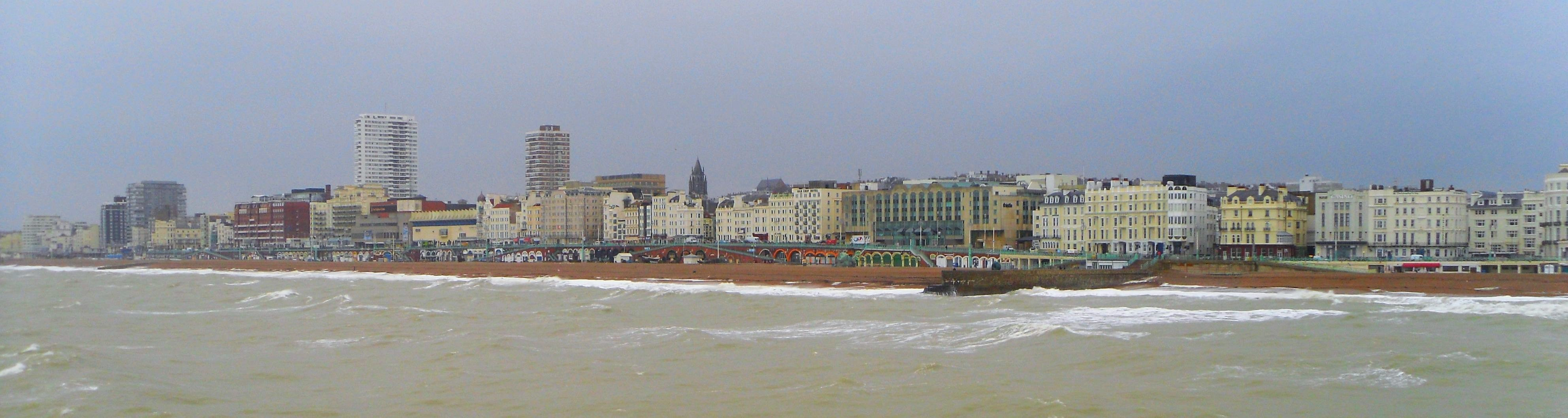
Brighton seafront from the Palace Pier

=== Climate ===
Brighton has a temperate climate: its Köppen climate classification is Cfb. It is characterised by cool summers and cool winters with frequent cloudy and rainy periods. Average rainfall levels increase as the land rises: the 1958–1990 mean was 740 mm (29 in) on the seafront and about 1,000 mm (39 in) at the top of the South Downs above Brighton. Storms caused serious damage in 1703, 1806, 1824, 1836, 1848, 1850, 1896, 1910 and 1987. Heavy snow is rare, but particularly severe falls were recorded in 1881 and 1967.

Climate data for Brighton
Month	Jan	Feb	Mar	Apr	May	Jun	Jul	Aug	Sep	Oct	Nov	Dec	Year
Mean daily maximum °C (°F)	8.0 (46.4)	8.6 (47.5)	10.6 (51.1)	13.5 (56.3)	16.5 (61.7)	19.4 (66.9)	21.2 (70.2)	21.2 (70.2)	19.4 (66.9)	15.9 (60.6)	11.6 (52.9)	8.8 (47.8)	14.6 (58.3)
Mean daily minimum °C (°F)	3.9 (39.0)	3.1 (37.6)	3.8 (38.8)	5.3 (41.5)	8.6 (47.5)	11.2 (52.2)	13.3 (55.9)	13.3 (55.9)	11.1 (52.0)	9.1 (48.4)	5.9 (42.6)	3.7 (38.7)	7.7 (45.9)
Average precipitation mm (inches)	74 (2.9)	57 (2.2)	42 (1.7)	34 (1.3)	45 (1.8)	39 (1.5)	50 (2.0)	55 (2.2)	47 (1.9)	77 (3.0)	86 (3.4)	75 (3.0)	680 (26.8)
Source: WeatherOnline

Average sea temperature
Jan	Feb	Mar	Apr	May	Jun	Jul	Aug	Sep	Oct	Nov	Dec	Year
9.2 °C (48.6 °F)	8.7 °C (47.7 °F)	8.2 °C (46.8 °F)	9.6 °C (49.3 °F)	11.4 °C (52.5 °F)	13.6 °C (56.5 °F)	15.4 °C (59.7 °F)	16.9 °C (62.4 °F)	17.3 °C (63.1 °F)	16.3 °C (61.3 °F)	14.7 °C (58.5 °F)	12.0 °C (53.6 °F)	12.8 °C (55.0 °F)

=== Boundaries and areas ===
Date from	Parish area
c. 11th century	1,640 acres (660 ha)
31 October 1873	1,640 acres (660 ha)
1 October 1923	1,640 acres (660 ha)
1 April 1928	12,503 acres (5,060 ha)
1 April 1952	14,347 acres (5,806 ha)
31 March 1972	15,041 acres (6,087 ha)
1 April 1993	15,140 acres (6,130 ha)
1 April 1997 (Note: Area of the unitary authority of Brighton and Hove)	21,632 acres (8,754 ha)

At the time of the Domesday survey in 1086, Brighton was in the Rape of Lewes and the Hundred of Welesmere. The new Hundred of Whalesbone, which covered the parishes of Brighton, West Blatchington, Preston and Hove, was formed in 1296. Parishes moved in and out several times, and by 1801 only Brighton and West Blatchington were included in the Hundred.

In its original form, Brighton parish covered about 1,640 acres (660 ha) between the English Channel, Hove, Preston, Ovingdean and Rottingdean. The borough (but not the civil parish) was first extended from 31 October 1873, when 905 acres (366 ha) was annexed from Preston civil parish. In 1894 the part outside the borough became Preston Rural civil parish and Preston civil parish continued in the borough. On 1 April 1889 Brighton became a county borough.

On 1 October 1923, 94 acres (38 ha) were added to Brighton borough and to Preston civil parish from Patcham parish: Brighton Corporation was developing the Moulsecoomb estate there at the time. On 1 April 1928, Brighton civil parish was extended to include Preston civil parish. On the same date the borough grew by nearly five times by adding Ovingdean and Rottingdean parishes in their entirety and parts of Falmer, Patcham and West Blatchington; it also exchanged small parts with Hove municipal borough. All the areas added to the borough became part of Brighton civil parish. From 1 April 1952, more of Falmer and part of the adjacent Stanmer parish were added; 20 years later, land and marine territory associated with the new Brighton Marina development also became part of Brighton. Except for a small addition of rural land in 1993 (from Pyecombe parish), Brighton Borough's boundaries remained the same until it was joined to Hove Borough in 1997 to form the unitary authority of Brighton and Hove.

The old boundary between Brighton and Hove is most clearly seen on the seafront, where the King Edward Peace Statue (1912) straddles the border, and in a twitten called Boundary Passage which runs northwards from Western Road to Montpelier Place. There is a Grade II listed parish boundary marker stone in this passageway. Between Western Road and the seafront, the boundary runs up Little Western Street (pavement on eastern side, in Brighton), but it is not visible. Northwards from Western Road, it runs to the west of Norfolk Road, Norfolk Terrace, Windlesham Road and Windlesham Gardens in the Montpelier area, then along the south side of Davigdor Road to Seven Dials. From there it runs along the west side of Dyke Road as far as Withdean Road in Withdean, at which point it crosses Dyke Road so that the section north of that is part of Hove parish. The boundary continues to follow Dyke Road towards Devil's Dyke on the South Downs.

== Governance and politics ==
Brighton is covered by two constituencies in the Parliament of the United Kingdom: Brighton Kemptown and Peacehaven and Brighton Pavilion. In the 2024 general election, Brighton Kemptown elected Chris Ward, Labour; Brighton Pavilion elected Siân Berry, Green Party.

There are 21 wards in the city of Brighton and Hove, of which 12 are in Brighton. Regency, St Peter's & North Laine, Preston Park, Withdean, Patcham, Hollingdean & Stanmer and Hanover & Elm Grove are part of the Brighton Pavilion constituency; Moulsecoomb & Bevendean, Queen's Park, East Brighton, Woodingdean and Rottingdean Coastal are covered by the Brighton Kemptown constituency.

The newly created Borough of Brighton consisted of six wards in 1854: St Nicholas, St Peter, Pier, Park, Pavilion and West. When the territory was extended to include part of Preston parish in 1873, the new area became a seventh ward named Preston. The seven were split into 14 in 1894: Hanover, Kemp Town (renamed King's Cliff in 1908), Lewes Road, Montpelier, Pavilion, Pier, Preston, Preston Park, Queen's Park, Regency, St John, St Nicholas, St Peter, and West. Preston ward was extended in 1923 to incorporate the area taken into the borough from Patcham parish in 1923 for the construction of the Moulsecoomb estate, and in 1928 the ward was divided into four: Hollingbury, Moulsecoomb, Preston and Preston Park. Elm Grove and Patcham wards were created at the same time, bringing the total to 19. There were further changes in 1952, 1955 and 1983, at which time there were 16 wards. This situation continued until 1 April 1997, when Hove and its wards became part of the new unitary authority of Brighton and Hove.

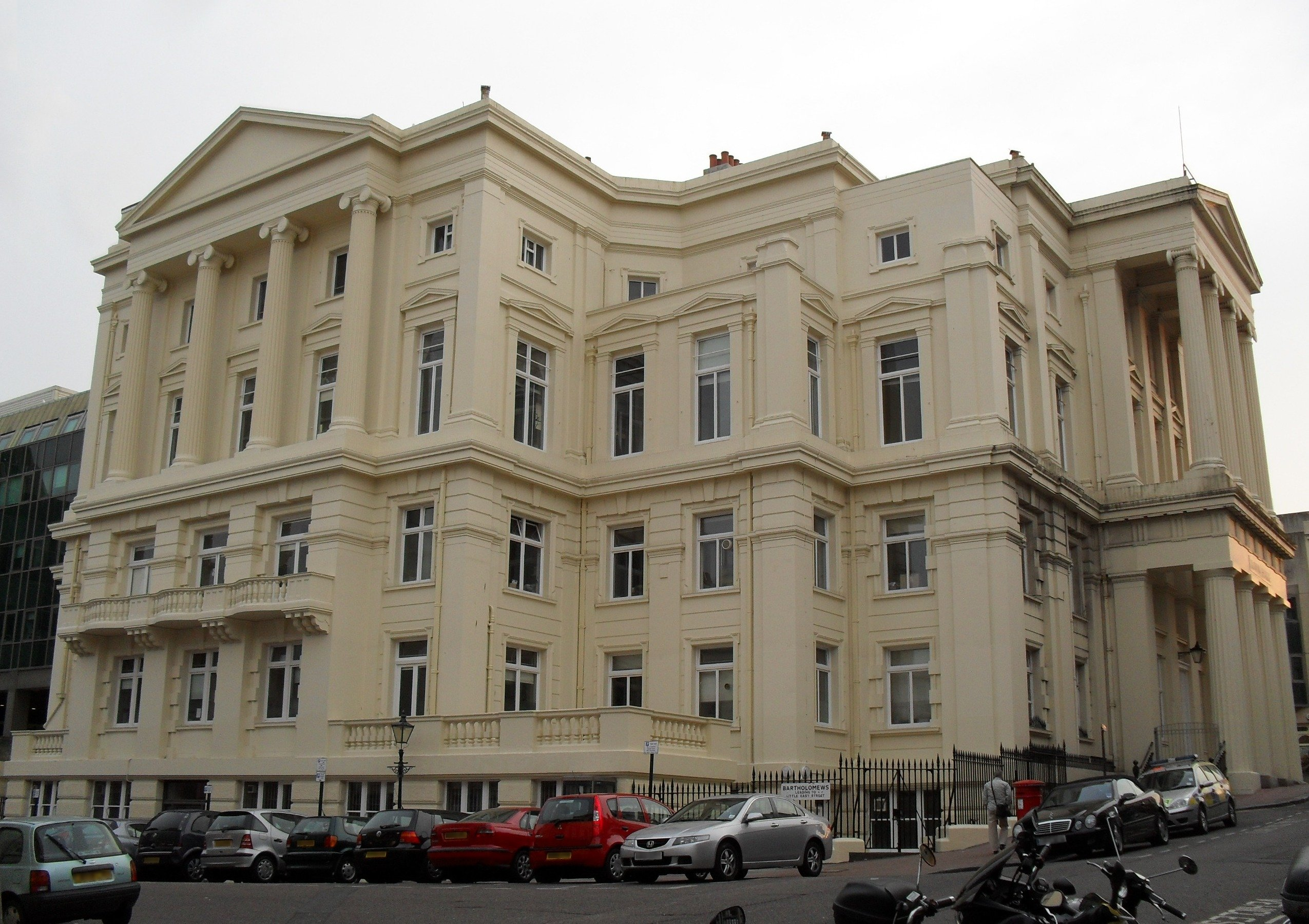
Brighton Town Hall dates from 1830.

Brighton Town Hall occupies a large site in the Lanes. Medieval Brighthelmston had a town hall, although it was called the Townhouse and functioned more like a market hall. A later building (1727) known as the Town Hall was principally used as a workhouse. Work on the first purpose-built town hall began in 1830; Thomas Read Kemp laid the first stone, and Thomas Cooper designed it on behalf of the Brighton Town Commissioners (of which he was a member). Brighton Corporation spent £40,000 to extend it in 1897–99 to the Classical design of Brighton Borough Surveyor Francis May. Despite this, the building was too small for municipal requirements by the mid-20th century, and extra council buildings were built in locations throughout Brighton Borough Council's existence: the most recent, Bartholomew House and Priory House next to the town hall, were finished in 1987. The town hall ceased to be responsible solely for Brighton's affairs when Brighton and Hove were united in 1997, but it is still used by Brighton & Hove City Council—particularly for weddings and civil partnerships.

The presence of a British subsidiary of the United States arms company EDO Corporation on the Home Farm Industrial Estate in Moulsecoomb has been the cause of protests since 2004. The premises were significantly damaged in January 2009 when protesters broke in.

== Economy ==
In 1985, the Borough Council described three "myths" about Brighton's economy. Common beliefs were that most of the working population commuted to London every day; that tourism provided most of Brighton's jobs and income; or that the borough's residents were "composed entirely of wealthy theatricals and retired business people" rather than workers. Brighton has been an important centre for commerce and employment since the 18th century. It is home to several major companies, some of which employ thousands of people locally; as a retail centre it is of regional importance; creative, digital and new media businesses are increasingly significant; and, although Brighton was never a major industrial centre, its railway works contributed to Britain's rail industry in the 19th and 20th centuries, particularly in the manufacture of steam locomotives.

Since the amalgamation of Brighton and Hove, economic and retail data has been produced at a citywide level only. Examples of statistics include: Brighton and Hove's tourism industry contributes £380m to the economy and employs 20,000 people directly or indirectly; the city has 9,600 registered companies; and a 2001 report identified it as one of five "supercities for the future". Tourist numbers dropped during the Coronavirus pandemic to 9 million from their 2019 peak of 12.4 million, but are gradually increasing, with 11.4 million tourists visiting in 2024.

=== Commerce and industry ===
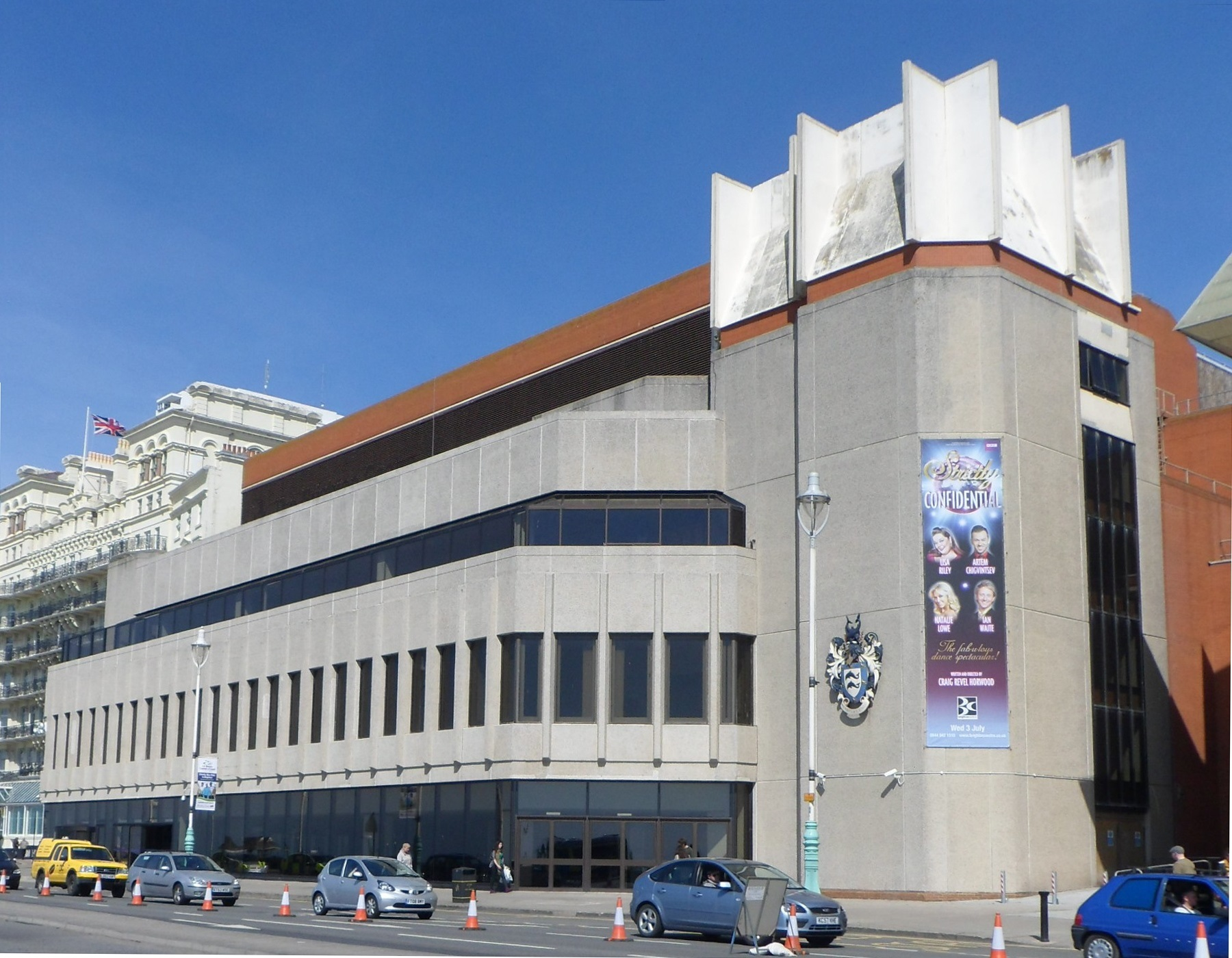
Events at the Brighton Centre are important to Brighton's economy.

Brighton's largest private sector employer is American Express, whose European headquarters are at John Street. As of 2012, about 3,000 people work there. Planning permission to demolish the old Amex offices and build a replacement was granted in 2009, and work started in March 2010. Other major employers include Lloyds Bank, Legal & General, Asda (which has hypermarkets at Hollingbury and Brighton Marina), Brighton & Hove Bus and Coach Company and call-centre operator Inkfish. In 2012, it was reported that about 1,500 of Gatwick Airport's 21,000 workers lived in the city of Brighton and Hove.

Brighton is a popular destination for conferences, exhibitions and trade fairs, and has had a purpose-built conference centre—the Brighton Centre—since 1977. Direct income from the Brighton Centre's 160 events per year is £8 million, (Note: 2009 figures) and a further £50 million is generated indirectly by visitors spending money during their stay. Events range from political party conferences to concerts.

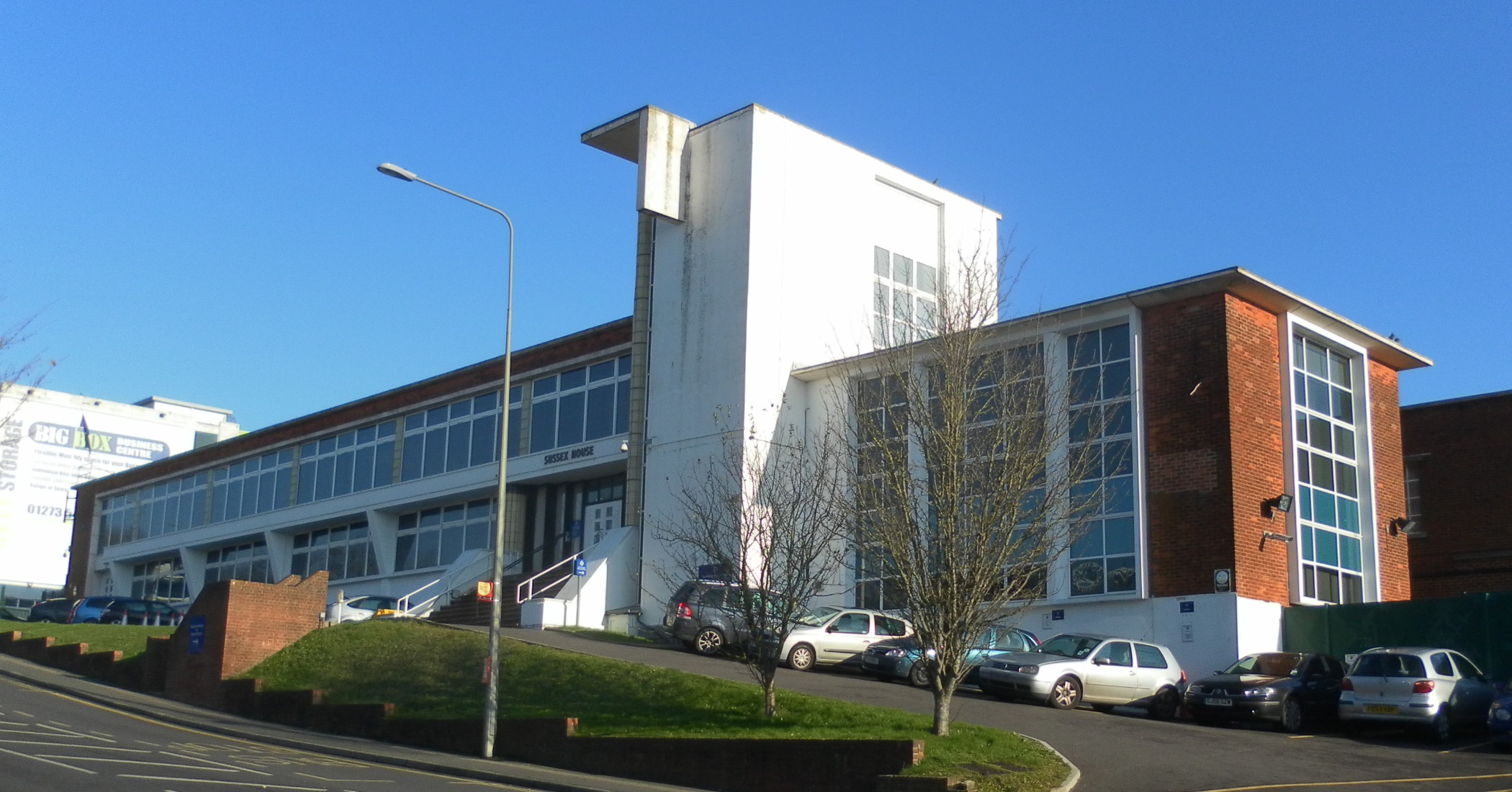
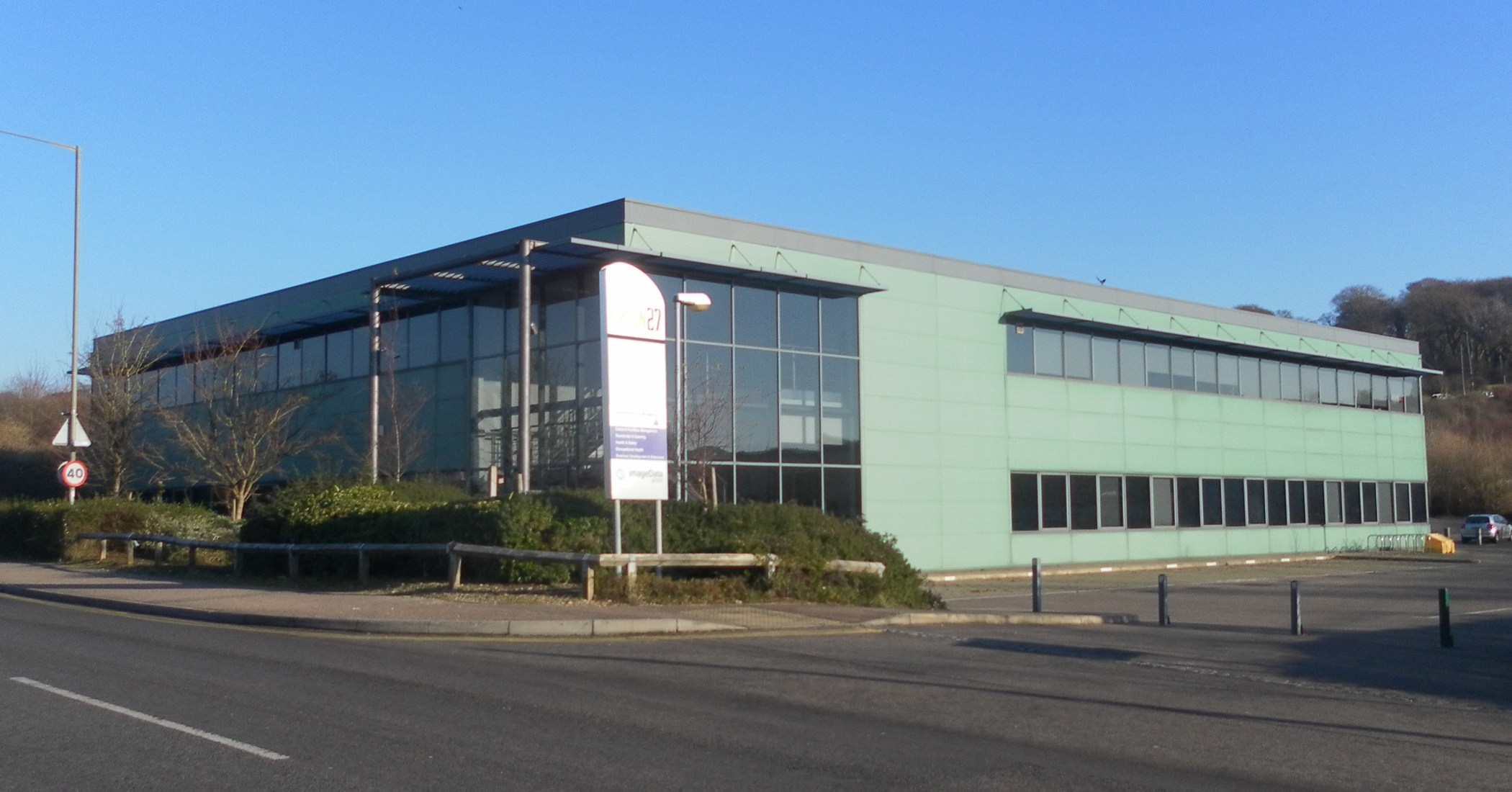
The Hollingbury Industrial Estate has large industrial, commercial and retail buildings such as Sussex House (left) and Exion 27 (right).

The Hollingbury Industrial Estate is one of the largest such facilities in Brighton; in its early days about 6,000 people were employed, principally in industrial jobs, but in the late 20th and early 21st centuries its focus has switched to commercial and retail development, limiting Brighton's potential for industrial growth. Brighton Corporation laid out the estate on 18 acres (7.3 ha) of land around Crowhurst Road in 1950. By 1956, large-scale employment was provided at a bakery, a typewriter factory and a machine tools manufacturer among others. Most of the large factories closed during the recessions of the 1980s and 1990s, employment fell to 1,000, and structural changes started in the mid-1980s with a move towards small-scale industrial units (the Enterprise Estate was finished in October 1985) and then retail warehouses. Asda's superstore opened in November 1987, MFI followed two years later, and other retail units were built in the 1990s. Two large headquarters buildings were vacated in quick succession when British Bookshops left in March 2011 and The Argus newspaper moved out of its headquarters in 2012—although the Brighton & Hove Bus and Coach Company signed a contract to move its 1,250 employees into the latter building.

Brighton has a high density of businesses involved in the media sector, particularly digital or "new media", and since the 1990s has been referred to as "Silicon Beach". By 2007, over 250 new media business had been founded in Brighton. Brandwatch is a social media monitoring company based in offices near Brighton station. Computer game design company Black Rock Studio was founded in 1998 and was taken over by Disney Interactive Studios, who closed it down in 2011. The Gamer Network, whose portfolio of websites relating to computer gaming (including Eurogamer) and creative industries was founded in 1999, is based in Brighton.

By the early 21st century, the market for office accommodation in the city was characterised by fluctuating demand and a lack of supply of high-quality buildings. As an example, the Trafalgar Place development (c. 1990), "now considered a prime office location", stood partly empty for a decade. Exion 27 (built in 2001), a high-tech, energy-efficient office development at Hollingbury, remained empty for several years and is still not in commercial use: it houses some administrative departments of the University of Brighton. It was Brighton's first ultramodern commercial property and was intended for mixed commercial and industrial use, but its completion coincided with a slump in demand for high-tech premises.

=== Retail and shopping ===
Brighton is well known for its high number of independent shops, which add to the character of the city.

Walking from Brighton station towards the seafront, first, is the North Laine area, stretching from Trafalgar Street, Kensington Gardens, Sydney Street, Gardner Street and Bond Street and is mostly pedestrianised. It is a retail, leisure and the residential area immediately north of the Lanes. Its name derives from the Anglo-Saxon "Laine" meaning "fields", although the misnomer "North Lanes" is often used to describe the area. The North Laine contains a mix of businesses dominated by cafés, bars, theatres, and over 400 shops independent and avant-garde shops including an erotic shop and indoor flea markets.

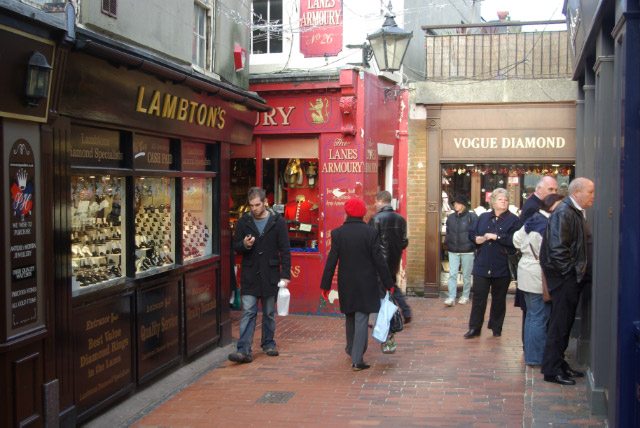
The Lanes is a tourist attraction occupied by small independent shops.

The Lanes which is characterised by a labyrinth of narrow alleyways form a retail, leisure and residential area near the seafront, following the street pattern of the original fishing village. The Lanes contain predominantly clothing stores, jewellers, antique shops, restaurants and pubs.

Churchill Square is a shopping centre with a floor space of 470,000 ft^{2} (44,000 m^{2}) and over 80 shops, several restaurants and 1,600 car-parking spaces. It was built in the 1960s as an open-air, multi-level pedestrianised shopping centre, but was rebuilt and enlarged in 1998 and is no longer open-air. Further retail areas include Western Road and London Road, the latter of which is undergoing extensive regeneration in the form of new housing and commercial properties.

There are two weekly flea market / bootfairs in Brighton on Sunday mornings, one at Brighton Marina on the top open-air level of the carpark, and another at Brighton Racecourse.

== Landmarks ==
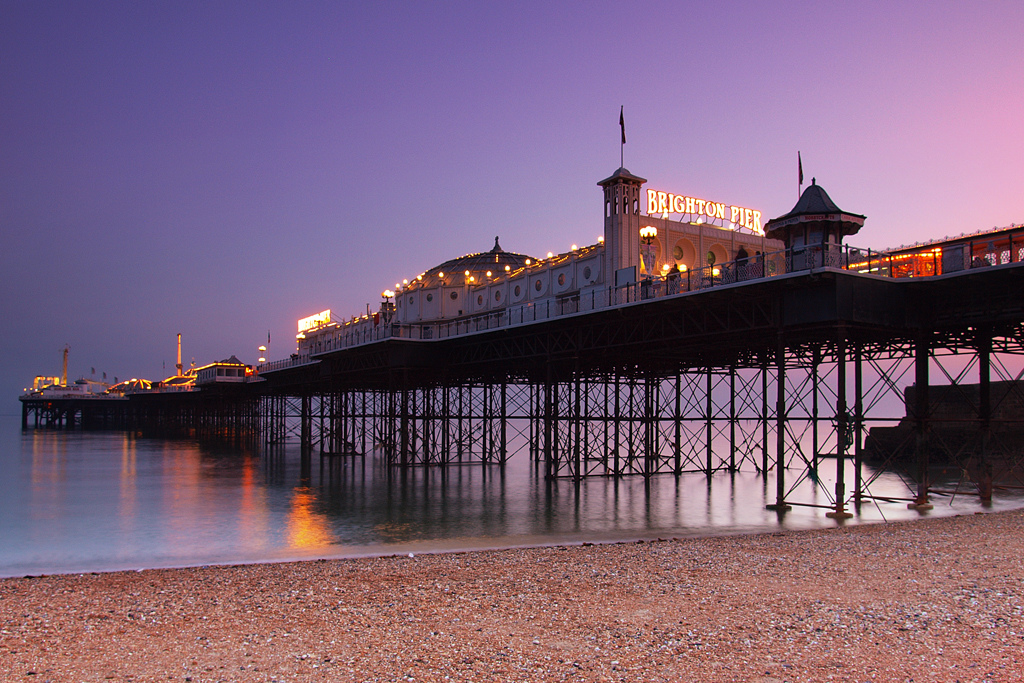
Palace Pier at dusk

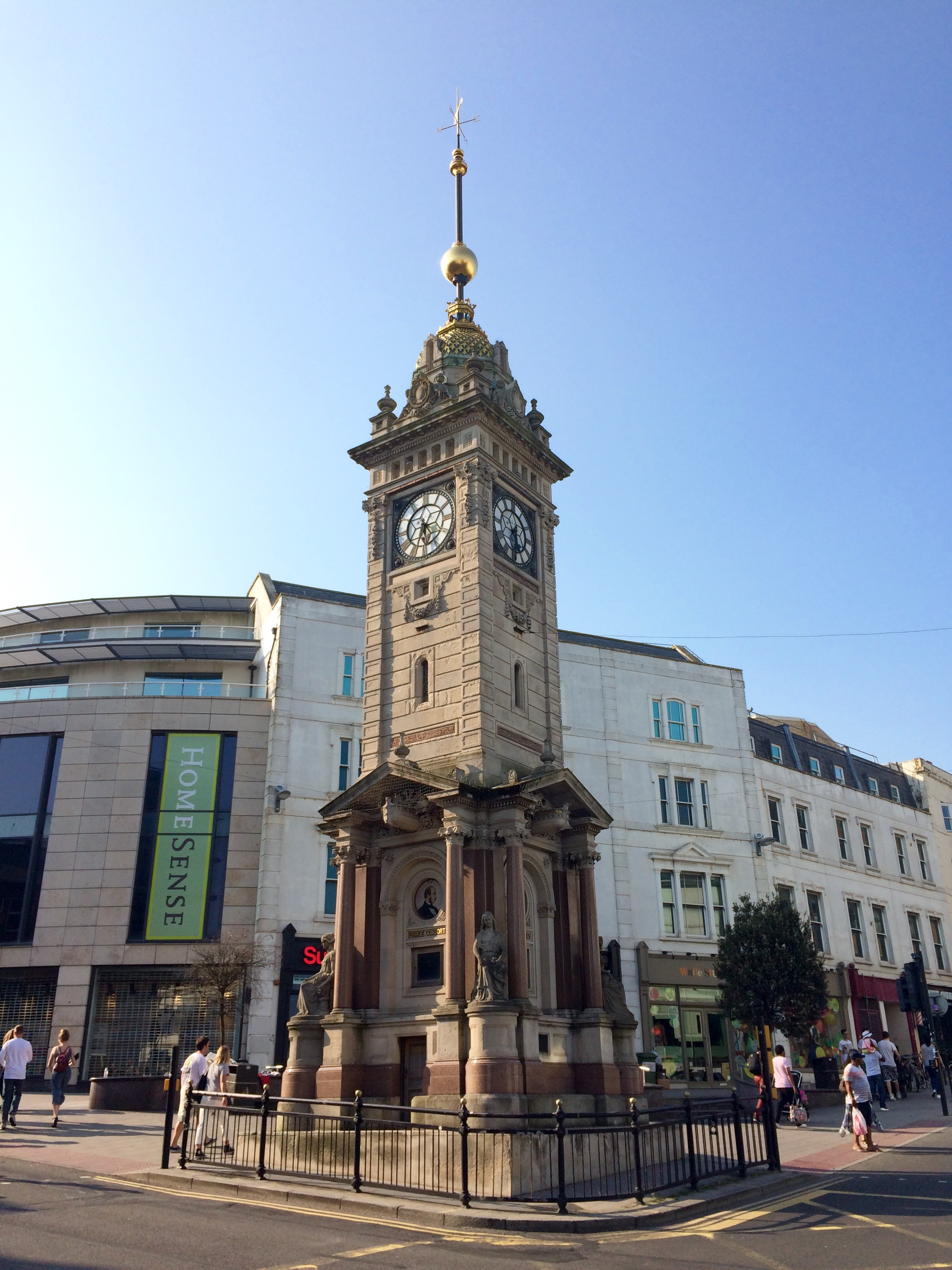
The Clock Tower in central Brighton

The Royal Pavilion, a Grade I listed building, is a former royal palace built as a home for the Prince Regent during the early 19th century, under the direction of the architect John Nash. It is notable for its Indo-Saracenic architecture and Oriental interior. Other Indo-Saracenic buildings in Brighton include the Sassoon Mausoleum, now, with the bodies reburied elsewhere, in use as a chic supper club.

The first of Brighton's three piers was the Chain Pier, which was destroyed in a storm in 1896. All that remains of the pier are small lumps of wood and stone, which are only visible at low tide. It was primarily intended as a landing stage for packet boats to Dieppe, France, but it also featured a small number of attractions including a camera obscura.

Brighton Marine Palace and Pier (long known as the Palace Pier) opened in 1899, it was meant to be a replacement for the Chain Pier, but became a pleasure pier instead. It features a funfair, restaurants and arcade halls. The West Pier was built in 1866 and is one of only two Grade I listed piers in the United Kingdom; it has been closed since 1975. For some time it was under consideration for restoration, but two fires in 2003, and other setbacks, led to these plans being abandoned. Nevertheless, publicity material presented in question-and-answer form during the building of the Brighton i360 observation tower (see below) maintained that the building of the tower would not prove prejudicial to the eventual restoration of the pier.

The Brighton i360, an observation tower located at the shore end of the West Pier, opened on 4 August 2016. At 162 m (531 ft) high, with a spacious glass viewing pod rising to 138 m (453 ft), it is Britain's highest observation tower outside London – taller even than the London Eye. With a diameter of 12.7 ft (3.9 m), it is also the thinnest tower in the world, with a height-to-width ratio of 41.15 to one.

Brighton Clock Tower, built in 1888 for Queen Victoria's jubilee, stands at the intersection of Brighton's busiest thoroughfares.

Volk's Electric Railway runs along the inland edge of the beach from Palace Pier to Black Rock and Brighton Marina. It was created in 1883 and is the world's oldest operating electric railway.

The Grand Hotel was built in 1864. The Brighton hotel bombing occurred there. Its nighttime blue lighting is particularly prominent along the foreshore.

=== Churches and other places of worship ===
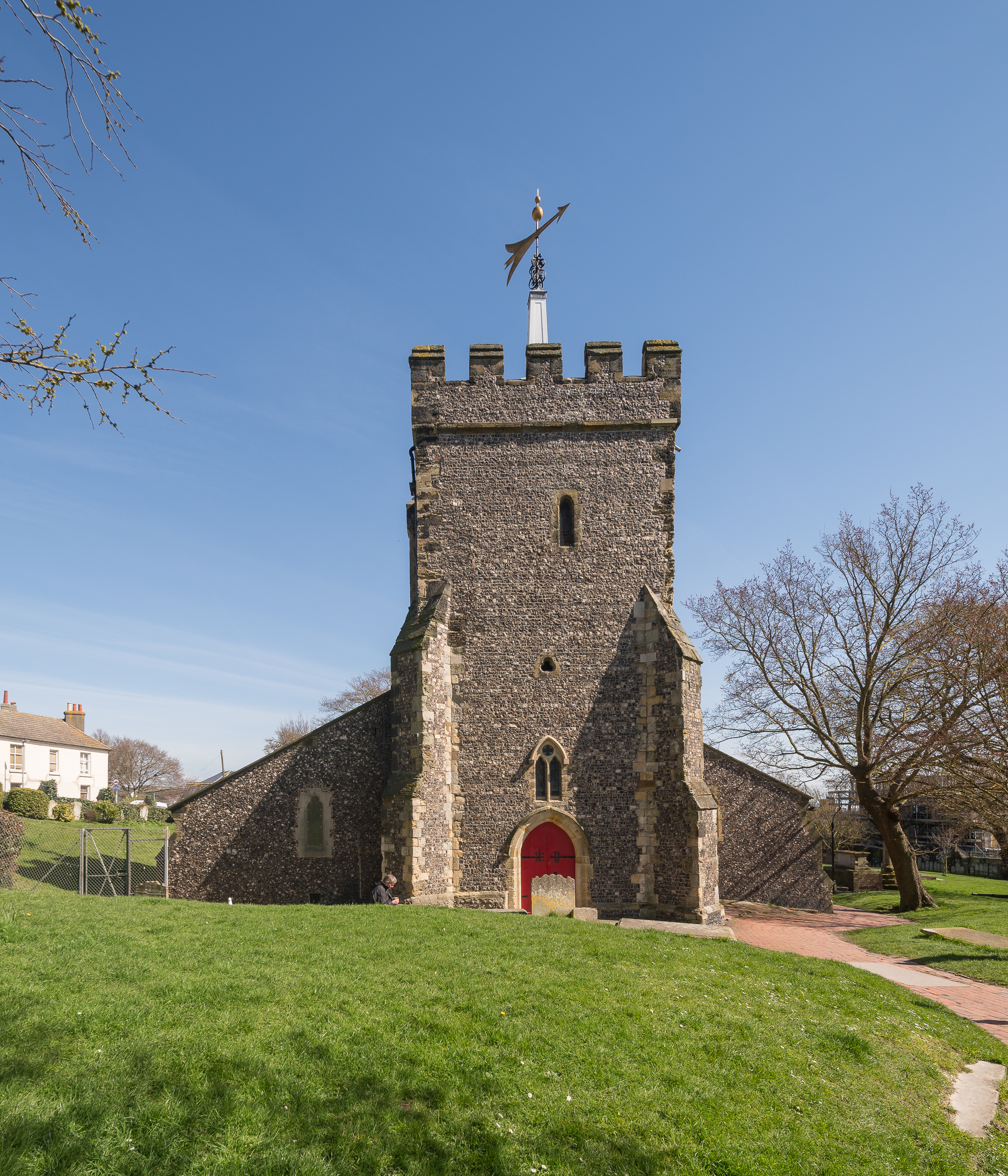
St Nicholas Church, Brighton's original parish church (April 2018)

St Nicholas Church may be the oldest building in Brighton (the Domesday Book records the presence of an Anglo-Saxon church, valued at £12) and is commonly known as "The Mother Church". Other notable Anglican churches include the very tall (the highest church interior in Britain) brick-built St Bartholomew's (1874) designed by the architect Edmund Scott; St Peter's (1828); and St Martin's (1875), noted for its ornate interior. Brighton's Quakers run the Friends Meeting House in the Lanes. There is an active Unitarian community based in a Grade II listed building in New Road. Brighton has six listed Roman Catholic churches; St John the Baptist's Church (1835) in Kemptown is the earliest surviving Roman Catholic church in the city.

Brighton and Hove has five synagogues: New Church Road Synagogue; Holland Road Synagogue; Brighton and Hove Progressive Synagogue; Brighton and Hove Reform Synagogue; and Middle Street Synagogue. The Middle Street Synagogue is a Grade II listed building built in 1874–75; it is being gradually restored by English Heritage. There are also several mosques and Buddhist centres.

=== Beaches ===
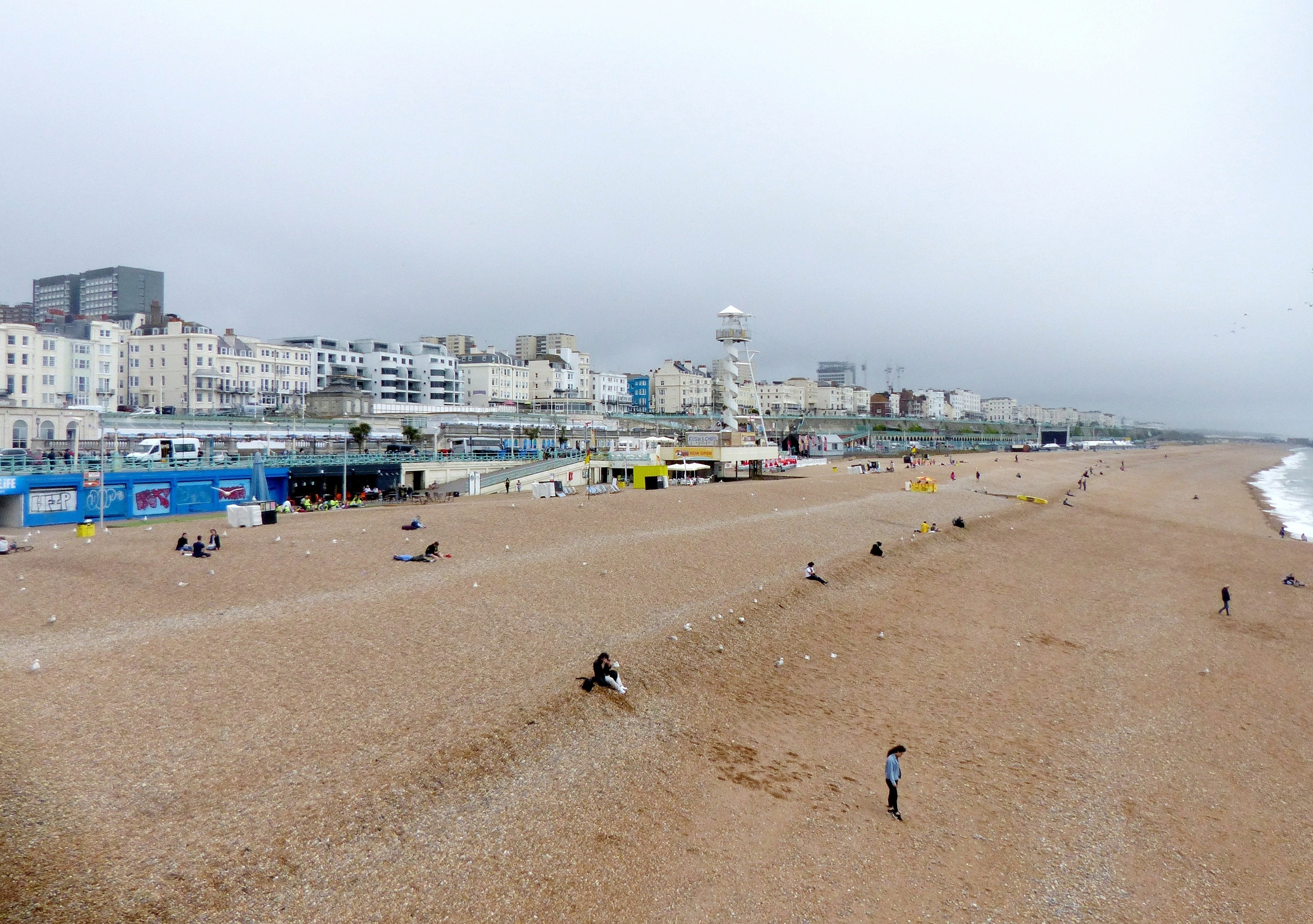
Brighton Beach, looking from the Palace Pier eastwards. The spiral tower is a Zip line ride (June 2018).

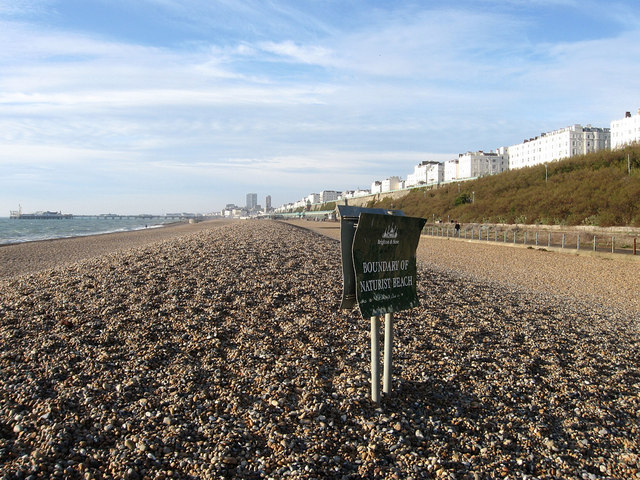
Cliff Beach, Britain's first naturist beach

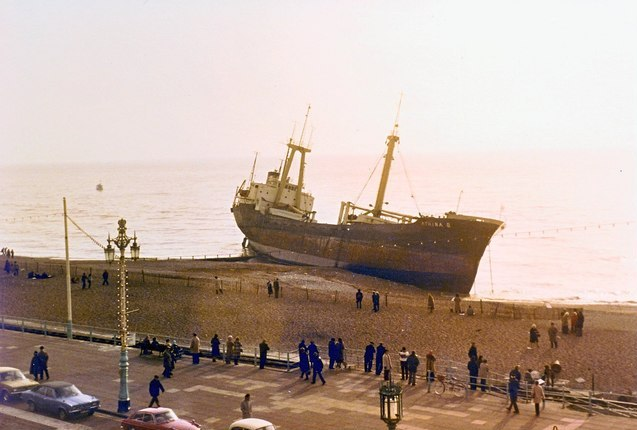
The Athina B beached in 1980

Brighton has a 5.4 mi (8.7 km) expanse of shingle beach, part of the unbroken 8 mi (13 km) section within the city limits. (Note: Until the extension of Brighton's boundaries to include Rottingdean and Saltdean in 1928, the coastline between the Hove and Rottingdean parish boundaries measured 2.2 mi (3.5 km).) A flat sandy foreshore is exposed at low tide. The seafront is home to many restaurants, sports facilities, amusement arcades, nightclubs and bars. At Black Rock, to the east of Brighton, a vegetated shingle wildlife habitat has been created. A 600m long boardwalk runs through the wildlife site. The Palace Pier section of the beach has been awarded blue flag status.

The city council owns all the beaches, which are divided into named sections by groynes—the first of which were completed in 1724. Eastwards from the Hove boundary, the names are Boundary, Norfolk, Bedford, Metropole, Grand (referring to the four hotels with those names), Centre, King's, Old Ship, Volk's, Albion, Palace Pier, Aquarium, Athina (where the MS Athina B ran aground), Paston, Banjo, Duke's, Cliff, Crescent and Black Rock. Cliff Beach is a nudist beach. Beyond Black Rock, the cliffs (part of the Brighton to Newhaven Cliffs Site of Special Scientific Interest) rise to more than 100 ft (30 m) and there are three small beaches at Ovingdean Gap, Rottingdean Gap and Saltdean Gap. All are connected by the Undercliff Walk, which has been affected by several cliff falls since 2000.

Part of the beach adjoining Madeira Drive, to the east of the city centre, was redeveloped opened to the public in March 2007, with a playground, mini-golf, beach saunas and beach volleyball courts.

On the sea wall of Madeira Drive is Madeira Terrace, a Grade II* listed, 865-metre-long stretch of seafront arches. The Terrace structure has degraded, deemed unsafe, and been closed to the public since 2014. The Terrace is being restored, with a number of plans submitted. In front of the Terrace has been built a new national outdoor swimming centre, including a 50m swimming pool with an adjoining complex of shops, and bars.

Since the demolition in 1978 of the Black Rock open-air lido at the eastern end of Brighton's seafront, the area has been developed and now features one of Europe's largest marinas. However, the site of the pool itself remains empty except for a skate park and graffiti wall. Since 2003 a series of developments have been proposed including housing, a five-star hotel with a winter garden, and an 11,000-seat sports arena.

=== Liz Williams Butterfly Haven ===
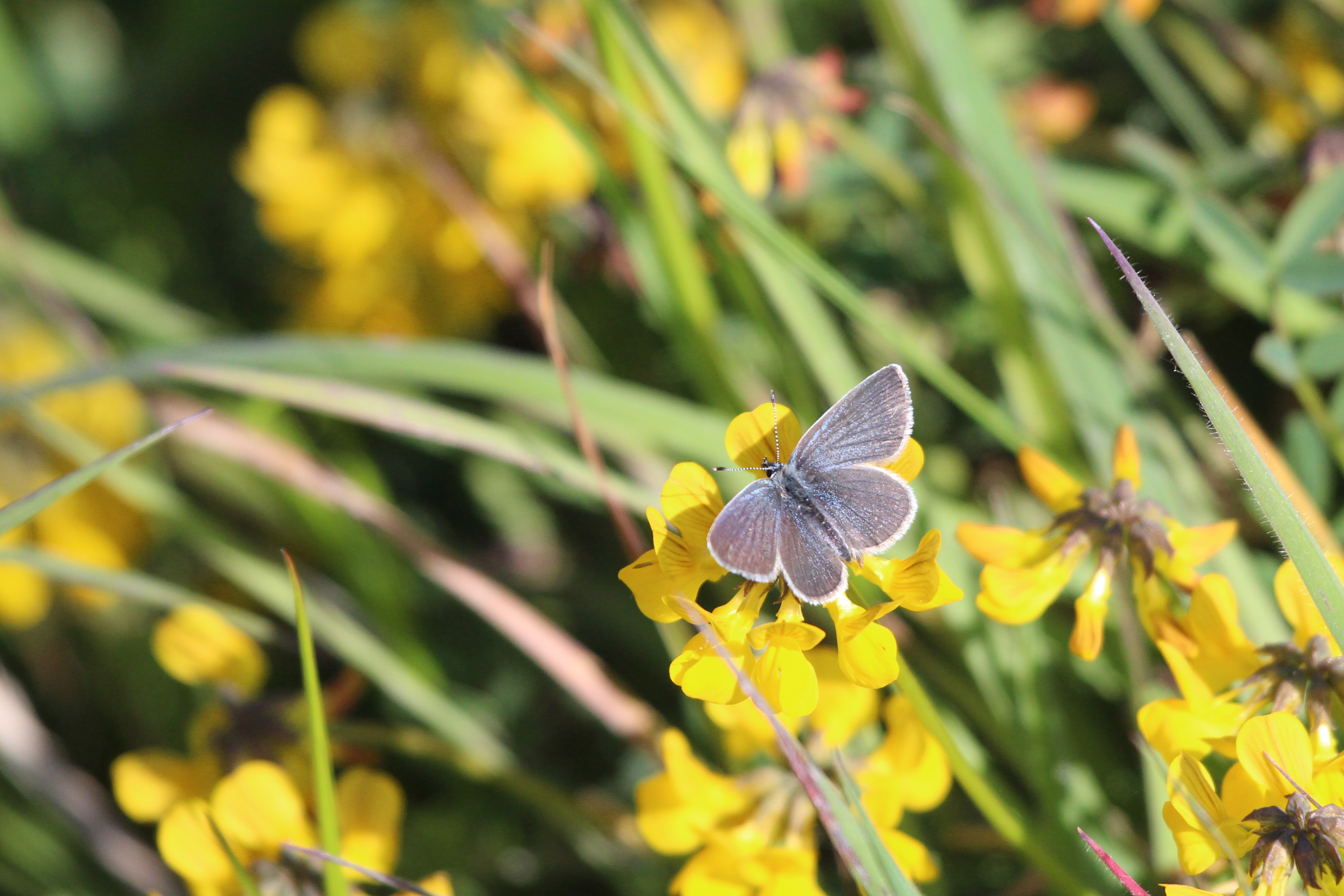
Small blue butterfly in the Liz Williams Butterfly Haven on a horseshoe vetch flower

The Liz Williams Butterfly haven (TQ 309 072) is a purpose-built area that has been created to attract and provide a habitat for butterflies. It is situated between Dorothy Stringer and Varndean College, north of Stringer Way. It was the brainchild of Dan Danahar with funding from the BBC, in conjunction with the National Lottery, through the Breathing Places scheme. This site was created between 2006 and 2007, and by September 2008 the late Liz Williams, botanist, had recorded 97 wildflower species and 10 species of grass. This was an order of magnitude increase in the floral diversity of the site within one year. As a tribute to her work, the site has been renamed the Liz Williams Butterfly Haven in 2011. Since its creation up to 2021 twenty-seven species of butterfly have been recorded here including Adonis blue, chalkhill blue, green hairstreak, dingy and chequered skipper.

=== The Woodvale Cemeteries ===
Woodvale (TQ 326 056) is actually five linked cemeteries that cover the western side of Race Hill. The cemeteries are east of Lewes Road and either side of Bear Road. Their cultural significance and importance to wildlife to the city were described evocatively by the Sussex field naturalist, David Bangs (p. 303).

"They are a profoundly peaceful place of little woods and glades, sunny banks and shady paths. They have become, in the last 150 years, reservoirs for much of the wildlife of the surrounding countryside. Some of the big beech trees down in Woodvale are as old as the cemeteries. The marbles, limestones, and granites of the memorials are a detective story for geologists. Yaffles call across the trees. The rare greater horseshoe bat has hibernated in the funerary buildings. Badgers pit the mossy turf in their search for earthworms, and violet and celandine cheer the turf in early spring."

=== Other landmarks ===
Brighton is the home of the UK's first Walk of Fame, which celebrates the many rich and famous people associated with the city.

== Culture ==
=== Cafes and restaurants ===
Brighton is characterised by small dining establishments and independent coffeehouses. Brighton has about 250 restaurants. It is known for having many vegan and vegetarian restaurants, and a 2022 analysis found the city has the highest density of vegan restaurants in the UK.

=== Media ===
Brighton has a local television channel, Latest TV, which broadcasts local news and entertainment. Local radio stations are BBC Radio Sussex, Heart South, Capital Brighton, Radio Reverb and Gaydio – a radio station for the city's LGTBQ+ community. The local newspaper is The Argus.

=== Cinema ===
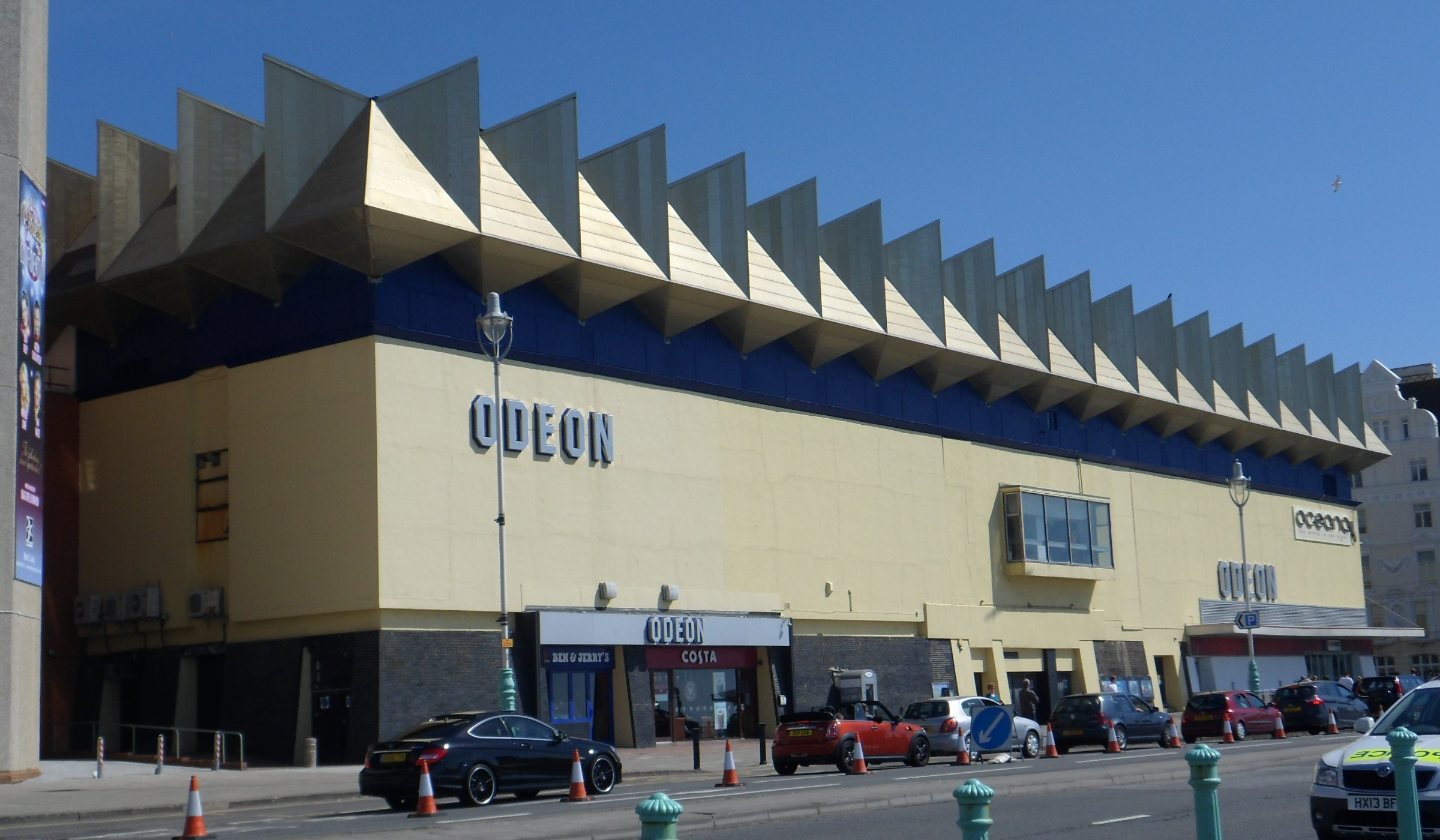
Odeon Kingswest on Brighton seafront opened in 1973.

Brighton featured in a number of popular movies including Carry on at Your Convenience (1971), Quadrophenia (1979), The End of the Affair (1999), Wimbledon (2004), MirrorMask (2005), Angus, Thongs and Perfect Snogging (2008), The Young Victoria (2009), Brighton Rock (2010 and 1947), and The Boat that Rocked (2009).

The Duke of York's Picturehouse, dating from 1910, was opened by Violet Melnotte-Wyatt. It is the country's oldest purpose-built cinema and was Brighton's first Electric Bioscope, which still operates as an arthouse cinema. The Duke of York's Picturehouse expanded in 2012, adding two additional screens in a different location. The company now occupies the upstairs of Komedia, situated on Gardner Street, central Brighton. There are two multiplex cinemas, the Odeon on North Street and Cineworld in the Marina.

=== Festivals and rallies ===
==== Past ====
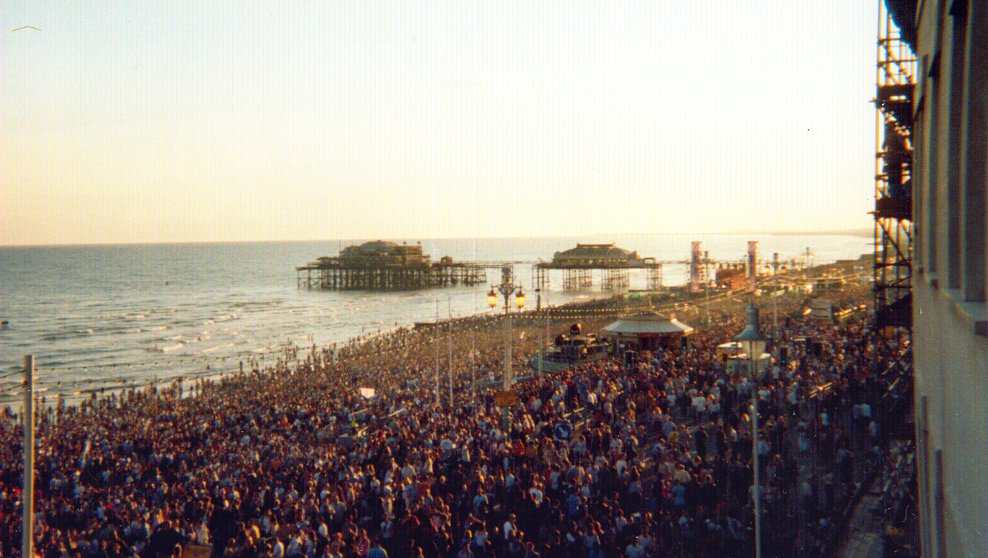
The outdoor Fatboy Slim concert Big Beach Boutique II in 2002

On 6 April 1974, Brighton was host to the 19th Eurovision Song Contest, where ABBA won in the Brighton Dome with their song Waterloo. The DJ and producer Fatboy Slim, who lives in Brighton, has held several concerts on Brighton beach, including in 2002, 2006 and 2008. The 2002 event, Big Beach Boutique II, is the largest outdoor party ever held in the UK, attended by 250,000 people.

An inaugural White Nights (Nuit Blanche) all-night arts festival took place in October 2008 and continued for four years until it was postponed in 2012 due to a lack of European funding. The Brighton Zine Fest, celebrating zine and DIY culture within the city, took place in 2009.

==== Present ====
Each May the city hosts the Brighton Festival, the second largest arts festival in the UK (after Edinburgh). This includes processions such as the Children's Parade, outdoor spectaculars often involving pyrotechnics, and theatre, music and visual arts in venues throughout the city, some brought into this use exclusively for the festival. The earliest feature of the festival, the Artists' Open Houses, are homes of artists and craftspeople opened to the public as galleries, and usually selling the work of the occupants. Since 2002, these have been organised independently of the official Festival and Fringe.

Brighton Fringe runs alongside Brighton Festival, and has grown to be one of the largest fringe festivals in the world. Together with the street performers from Brighton Festival's "Streets of Brighton" events, and the Royal Mile-esque outdoor performances that make up "Fringe City", outdoor spectacles and events more than double during May.

Brighton has two major film festivals and several other smaller ones:

- CINECITY: The Brighton Film Festival (also known as Brighton Film Festival) was founded in 2003, and is funded by the British Film Institute. It takes place each year in November with a strong focus on world cinema, international previews and archival screenings. It gives awards in three categories: New Voices - Under-25s Emerging Talent (supported by Screen and Film School, Brighton), for a short film made by young local filmmakers; Cinecity Open, for short films made by local filmmakers; and Features, for UK and international feature films of all genres, which are featured in the main programme.
- Brighton Rocks International Film Festival (BRIFF), Brighton's main forum for independent cinema, which takes place in June. There are many categories of awards, as well as special awards for young filmmakers. From 2025 (the 8th edition of the festival) it is being held at the Manchester Street Arts Club and Dukes at Komedia.
- Brighton International Animation Festival (BIAF), focused on animated films, was launched in 2022, and BAFTA-qualifying since 2024. It takes place in April.
- Oska Bright Film Festival, which showcases films by people with learning disabilities, autism, or Aspergers, was founded in 2004 by people with disabilities, and takes place in alternate years. In non-festival years, it tours the UK and internationally.
- COOS / Colour Out of Space International Festival of Experimental Sound and Art was established in 2006. Its focus is experimental music and its crossover with other artforms, including film. It is held over a weekend in August in the Sallis Benney Theatre.

In addition, films are also showcased in the Brighton and Brighton Pride festivals.

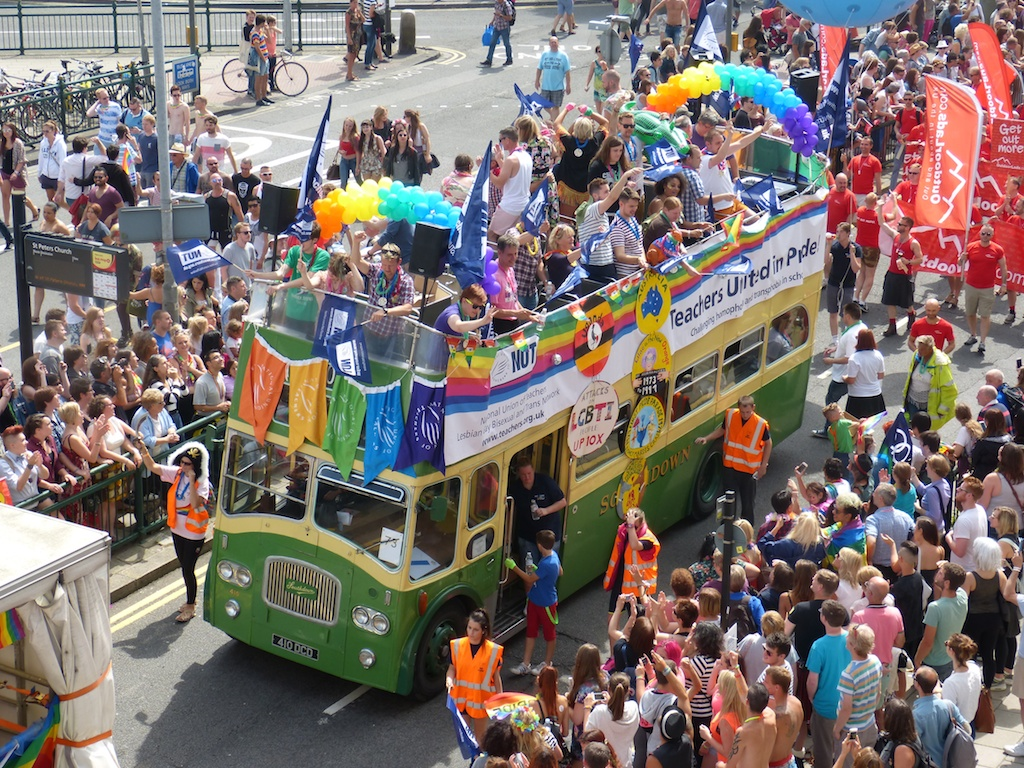
Brighton Pride 2014 bus

Brighton Pride is celebrated annually, attracting 450,000 to the city over the Pride weekend in 2018.

Since 2013, the city has also celebrated Brighton Trans Pride, the first and largest of its kind in the UK, a community-lead annual protest for liberation of the transgender community.

Disability Pride Brighton promotes acceptance and visibility for area residents who are disabled.

The Brighton Comedy Festival, also known as the Brighton Dome Comedy Festival, takes place in October each year at the Brighton Dome, which includes the Pavilion / Studio Theatre and the Corn Exchange. The festival was incorporated in 2001, and the inaugural festival was held in 2002. Other venues for live comedy include Komedia and the Brighton Comedy Garden.

The annual Brighton Digital Festival explores digital technology and culture. There were versions of such a festival in the late 1990s, but its current iteration came into being in 2011. Other festivals include: The Great Escape, featuring three nights of live music in venues across the city; the Soundwaves Festival in June, which shows classical music composed in the 21st Century; Paddle Round the Pier; Brighton Live; Burning the Clocks, a winter solstice celebration;

The Kemptown area has its own small annual street festival, the Kemptown Carnival, and the Hanover area similarly has a "Hanover Day".

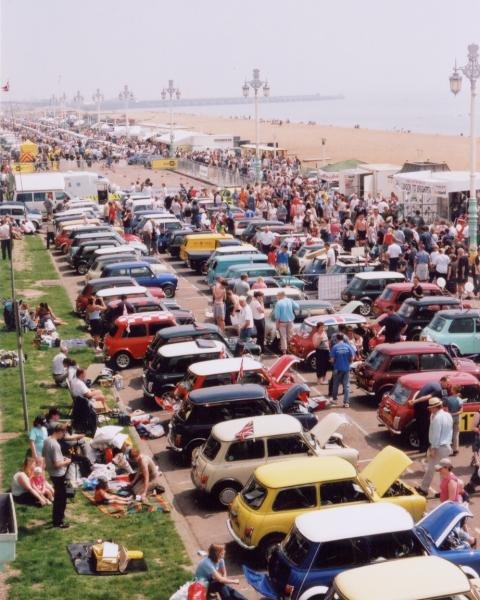
Seafront display of Minis after a London-to-Brighton drive

Brighton is the terminus of a number of London to Brighton events, such as the veteran car run and bike ride. Transport rallies are also hosted on the seafront. Groups of mods and rockers still bring their scooters and motorbikes to the city, but their gatherings are now much more sedate than the violent 1960s confrontations depicted in Quadrophenia.

Food- and drink-related festivals include the traditional Blessing of the Fisheries, where barbecued mackerel are eaten on the beach, and the more recent Fiery Foods Chilli Festival. There is also a twice-yearly general food festival. The main Sussex beer festival is held in nearby Hove, and there is a smaller beer festival in the Hanover area. The Vegfest (UK) festival was first held in Brighton in 2009. In 2023 it returned for its 15th year, after the COVID-19 pandemic. It takes place annually in March at the Hove Centre.

=== LGBT community ===
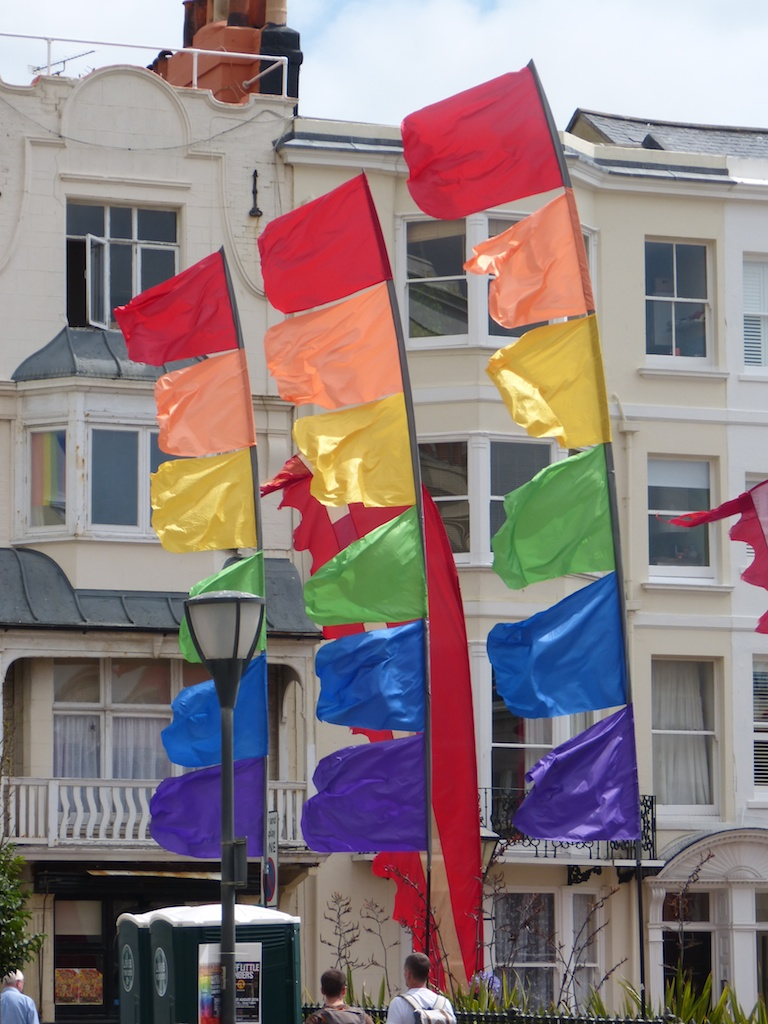
Rainbow flags in St James's Street, Kemptown

The lesbian, gay, bisexual and trans (LGBT) community in Brighton is one of the largest and most prominent in the UK, and Brighton has been named the "gay capital of the UK". There is record of LGBT history in the city dating to the 19th century. Many LGBT pubs, clubs, bars and shops are located around Brighton and in particular around St James's Street in Kemptown, including Club Revenge. Several LGBT charities, publishers, social and support groups are also based in the city. Brighton Pride is usually celebrated at the start of August.

=== Museums and galleries ===
Brighton museums include Brighton Museum & Art Gallery, which forms part of the pavilion Preston Manor, Booth Museum of Natural History, Brighton Toy and Model Museum, and Brighton Fishing Museum, which includes artefacts from the West Pier. The Royal Pavilion is also open to the public, serving as a museum to the British Regency.

Brighton has many galleries, including the Brighton Centre for Contemporary Arts (Brighton CCA) based at the University of Brighton, Phoenix Art Space, and ONCA.

=== Night-life and popular music ===
Brighton has many night-life hotspots and is associated with popular musicians including Fatboy Slim, Omar, Kirk Brandon, Tim Booth, Nick Cave, Lovejoy, David Van Day from Dollar, James Marriott, Adam Freeland, Orbital, and Robert Smith. Live music venues include Concorde 2, the Brighton Centre and the Brighton Dome, where ABBA received a substantial boost to their career when they won the Eurovision Song Contest 1974. Many events and performance companies operate in the city. Brighton also has the most electronic music events in the UK.

Brighton hosts the Great Escape music festival every May. Brighton has produced successful musical acts including Beats International, Norman Cook, Carl Cox, Dave Clarke, Krafty Kuts, Ed Solo, Evil Nine, Electrelane, James Marriott, Frazier Chorus, Peter and the Test Tube Babies, the Levellers, The Maccabees, Electric Soft Parade, British Sea Power, the Eighties Matchbox B-Line Disaster, the Xcerts, Architects, the Go! Team, Royal Blood, the Kooks, Freemasons, Blood Red Shoes, Lovejoy, Birdeatsbaby, and Rizzle Kicks. Brighton is also home to several independent record labels. The second half of 1973 rock opera Quadrophenia by the Who takes place at Brighton Beach.

=== Theatre ===
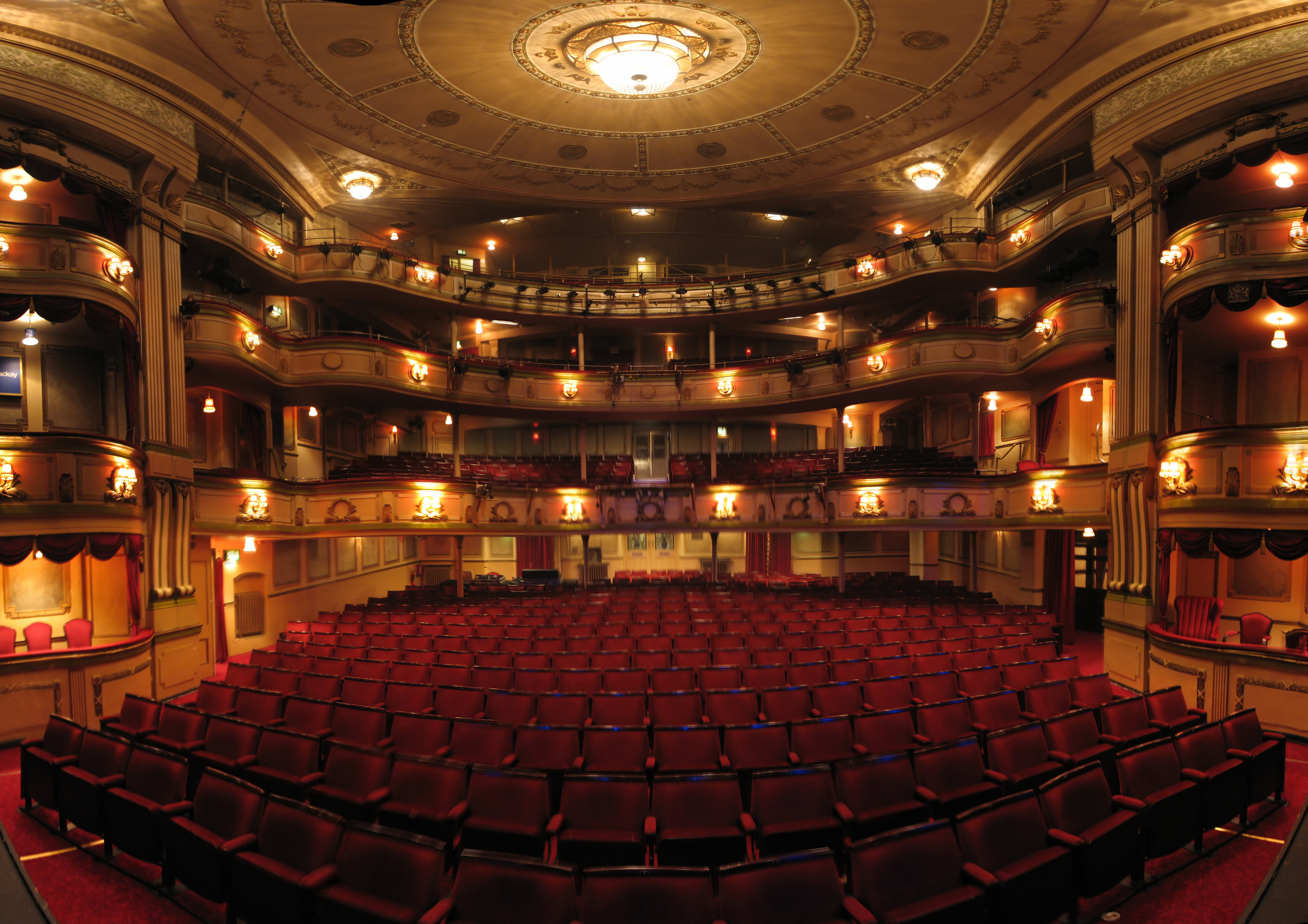
The Theatre Royal presents a range of West End and touring musicals and plays, along with performances of opera and ballet.

Theatres include the Brighton Dome and associated Pavilion Theatre, the expanded Komedia (primarily a comedy and music venue but also a theatre), the Old Market, which was renovated and re-opened in 2010, and the Theatre Royal, which celebrated its 200th anniversary in 2007. The Attenborough Centre for the Creative Arts is nearby, part of the University of Sussex campus. There are also smaller theatres such as the Marlborough Theatre, the New Venture, and the Brighton Little Theatre. The city has the purpose built Brighton Open Air Theatre, or B•O•A•T, which opened for the Brighton Festival in May 2015.

=== Parks ===
Stanmer Park sits on the northern edge of Brighton and extends into the South Downs. The largest urban park in the city is Preston Park and The Level was recently developed. Other parks include East Brighton Park, Queen's Park and Wild Park.

== Education ==
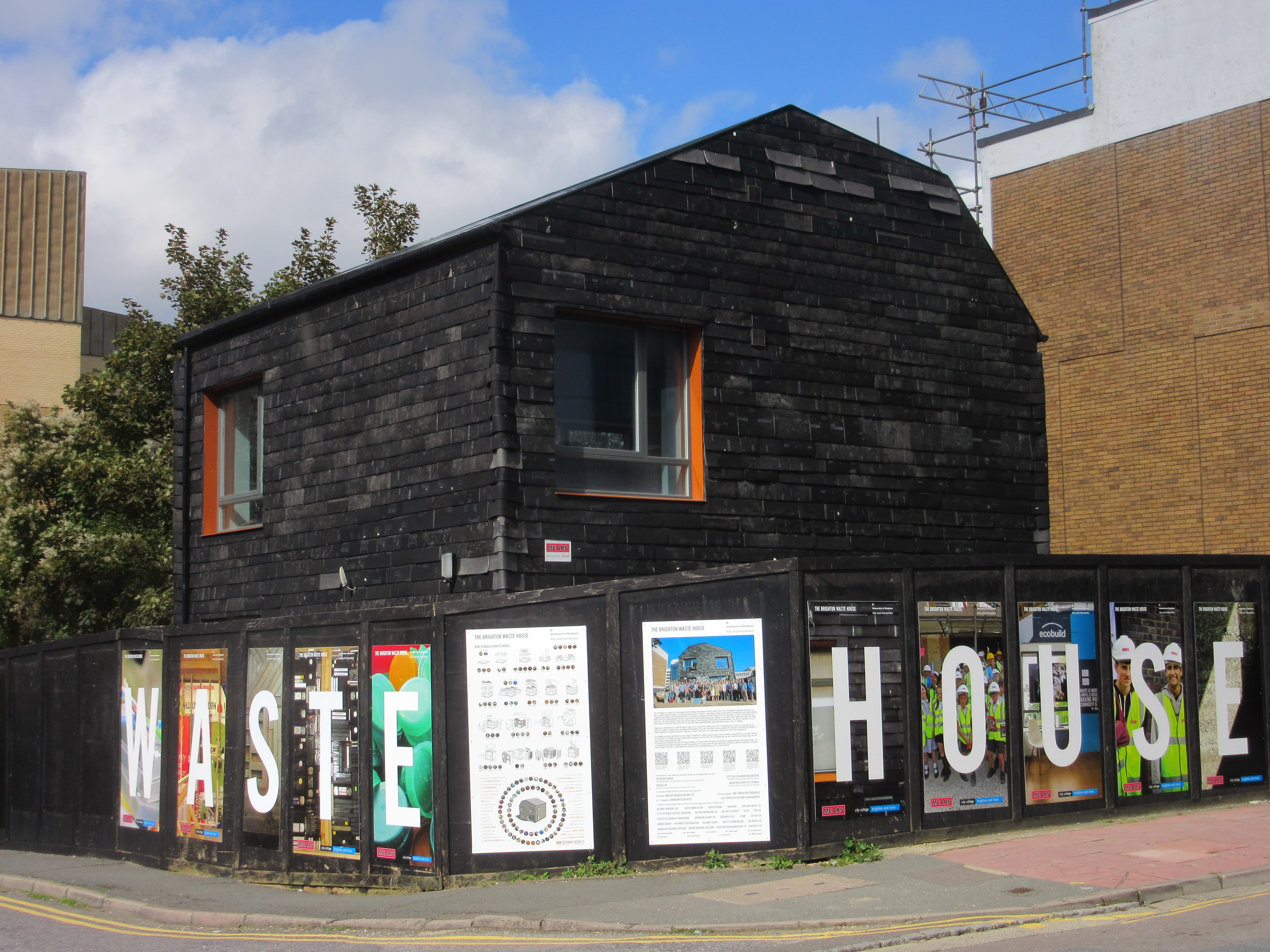
Waste House, on Brighton University campus, is a sustainable building constructed using waste materials to showcase sustainable construction practices.

The University of Brighton has been part of Brighton since 1859, starting as a school of art in the kitchens of the Royal Pavilion. It was granted university status in 1992, and now has a student population of around 18,000 of which 79 per cent are undergraduates. The university is based on four campuses – City campus in the heart of Brighton; Falmer campus set in the South Downs; Moulsecoomb campus on Lewes Road and Eastbourne campus.

The University of Sussex, established in 1961 as the first of the plate-glass universities, is a campus research intensive university between Stanmer Park and Falmer, four miles (6 km) from the city centre. The university is home to the Institute of Development Studies and the Science Policy Research Unit, amongst over 40 other established research centres, and has been ranked first in the world for Development studies by the World University Rankings. Served by trains (to Falmer railway station) and 24-hour buses, it has a student population of around 20,000 students of which about a quarter are postgraduates. The university has been ranked 41st in the UK by the Complete University Guide in its 2022 rankings and 246th in the world by the World University Rankings of 2021.

In 2001 the music college BIMM (British and Irish Modern Music Institute) opened in Brighton under the name The Brighton Institute of Modern Music. The college has approximately 1500 students across Brighton, its degree courses at BIMM are validated by the University of Sussex and diploma courses are taught at the Brighton Aldridge Community Academy. Notable alumni have included James Bay, The Kooks and Tom Odell. Since the college opened it has expanded to become Europe's largest music college with 6500 students studying at eight campuses across Europe including Bristol, London, Manchester, Berlin, Dublin, Hamburg, and Birmingham.

In 2003, the universities of Brighton and Sussex formed a medical school, known as Brighton and Sussex Medical School. The school was one of four new medical schools to be created as part of a government programme to increase the number of NHS doctors. The school is based at the University of Sussex campus and works closely with the Brighton and Sussex University Hospitals NHS Trust.

Brighton & Hove City Council is responsible for 80 schools, of which 54 are in Brighton.

A range of non-university courses for students over 16, mainly in vocational education subjects, are provided at the further education college, Greater Brighton Metropolitan College (previously City College and before that Brighton Technical College). More academic subjects can be studied by 16- to 19-year-olds at Brighton Hove & Sussex Sixth Form College (BHASVIC) in the Seven Dials area. Varndean College in North Brighton occupies a commanding position. The 1920s building is celebrated for its façade and internal quads. The college offers academic A levels, the International Baccalaureate and vocational courses, including BTECs.

As Brighton is home to public universities and colleges, it also home to private colleges such as Hove College located near the County Cricket Ground. The college was established in 1977 and offers higher educational courses such as vocational, certificate, professional, diploma and Advanced Diploma qualifications and has a close partnership with the University of Brighton.

There are state schools and some faith schools. Notable secondary state schools include Longhill High School, Varndean School, Patcham High School, Dorothy Stringer School, Blatchington Mill School, Hove Park School, Brighton Aldridge Community Academy, and King's School.

Special Education Schools include Downs View and Downs View Link College for people over 16. There are also Pupil Referral Units (PRUs).

There are a number of independent schools, including Brighton College, Roedean School, Steiner School, Brighton Girls (formerly known as Brighton and Hove High School (BHHS)), and a Montessori school. As with the state schools, some independents are faith-based; Torah Academy, the last Jewish primary school, became a Nursery School at the end of 2007. The Brighton Institute of Modern Music, a fully accredited music college, opened in 2001 and has since expanded to five locations throughout Britain.

Brighton has been ranked a top 10 student city in the UK by QS rankings.

== Sport ==
=== Football ===
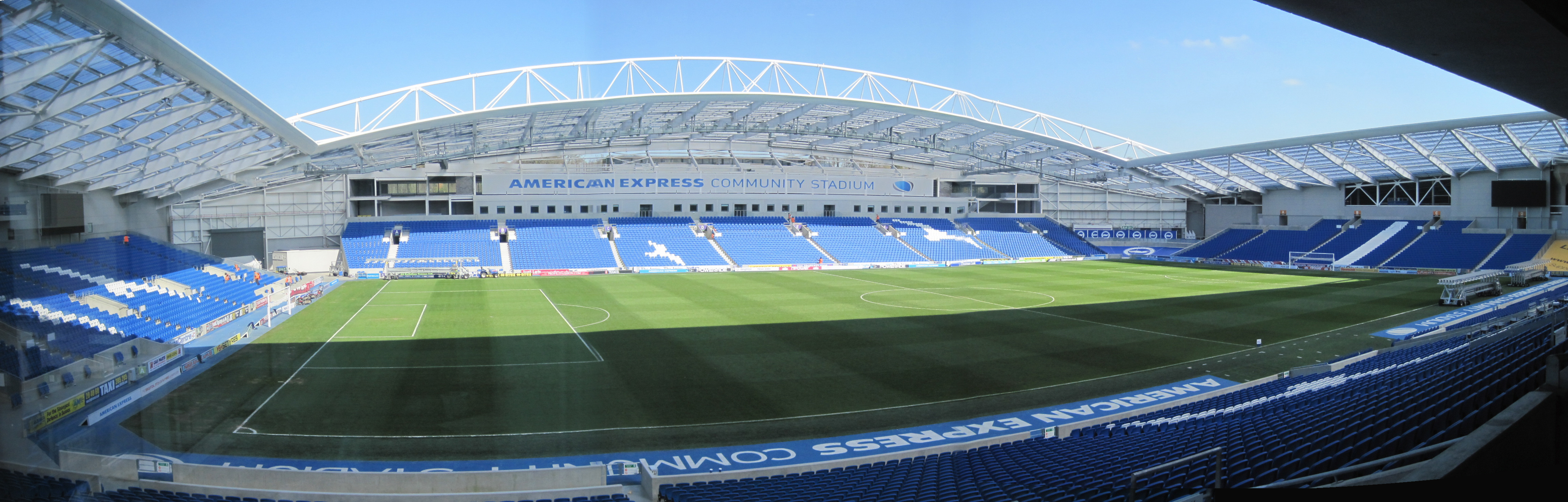
Falmer Stadium, home of Brighton & Hove Albion Football Club

Brighton & Hove Albion Football Club is the city's professional association football team. After playing at the Goldstone Ground for 95 years, the club spent 2 years ground-sharing 70 miles away at Gillingham F.C. before returning to the town as tenants of the Withdean Stadium. At the start of the 2011–12 season the club moved permanently to Falmer Stadium, a Premier League level stadium colloquially known as 'the Amex'. Notable achievements include winning promotion to the Football League First Division in 1979 and staying there for four seasons. They reached the 1983 FA Cup Final drawing 2–2 with Manchester United before losing in the replay 5 days later. The 2017–18 football season saw Brighton's debut in the Premier League after a win against Wigan Athletic guaranteed automatic promotion to the top flight.

Whitehawk Football Club is a semi-professional association football club based in a suburb in east Brighton. They play in the Isthmian League Premier Division. Games are played at The Enclosed Ground, which is set into the South Downs close to Brighton Marina.

=== Rugby ===
Brighton Football Club (RFU) is one of the oldest rugby clubs in England, founded in 1868 before the RFU. They currently play in the Premier division of London and South-East RFU League.

Brighton was chosen as one of the 13 Rugby World Cup 2015 host cities, with two games being played at the 30,750 capacity Falmer Stadium (although it was named the "Brighton Community Stadium" throughout the tournament for sponsorship reasons). One of the two games played was one of the biggest shocks in the history of Rugby Union, with Japan defeating South Africa 34 points to 32, with a try in the dying minutes of the game. The other game was between Samoa and the United States.

=== Hockey ===
Brighton & Hove Hockey Club is a large hockey club that train and play their matches at Blatchington Mill School. The men's 1XI gained promotion in 2013 to the England Hockey League system, Conference East.

=== Cricket ===
Sussex County Cricket Club play at County Cricket Ground in Hove. The ground has hosted one men's One Day International; the match was part of the 1999 Cricket World Cup, and was a Group A match between South Africa and India, which South Africa won by 4 wickets. The County Ground has also hosted 2 Test matches in The Women's Ashes in 1987 and 2005; in addition, the ground hosted two One Day Internationals in the 2013 Women's Ashes and, as of 2017, 5 Women's ODIs and 4 Women's T20Is have been hosted at the ground.

=== Other sports ===
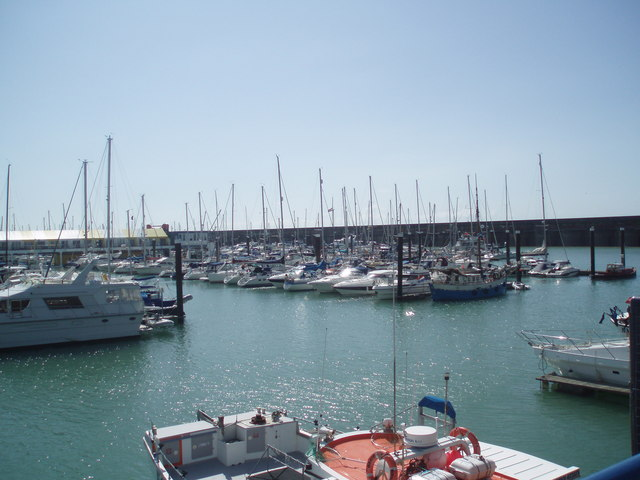
Brighton Marina

Motoring events take place on Madeira Drive, a piece of roadway on Brighton's seafront, throughout the year. It was originally constructed to host what is commonly held to be the world's oldest motor race, the Brighton Speed Trials, which ran from 1905 to 2023. The event was organised by the Brighton and Hove Motor Club.

Brighton has a horse racing course, Brighton Racecourse, with the unusual feature that when the full length of the course is to be used, some of the grass turf of the track has to be laid over the tarmac at the top of Wilson Avenue, a public road, which therefore has to be closed for the races. A greyhound racing circuit – the Brighton & Hove Greyhound Stadium – in Hove is run by Coral.

Brighton Sailing Club has been operating since the 1870s.

The Brighton and Hove Pétanque Club runs an annual triples, doubles and singles competition, informal KOs, winter and summer league, plus Open competitions with other clubs. The club is affiliated to Sussex Pétanque, the local region of the English Pétanque Association, so they can also play at a Regional and National level. The Peace Statue terrain is the official pétanque terrain situated on the seafront near the West Pier.

Brighton has two competitive swimming clubs: Brighton SC, formed in 1860, claims to be the oldest swimming club in England; and Brighton Dolphin SC was formed in 1891 as Brighton Ladies Swimming. Casual sea swimming is also a popular activity in Brighton, rising in popularity since the outbreak of the COVID-19 pandemic.

Amateur track cycling is held at the Preston Park Velodrome, the oldest velodrome in the UK, built in 1877.

There are three recognised surfing breaks close to Brighton, including East of the Marina, by the West Pier and at Shoreham harbour.

== Transport ==
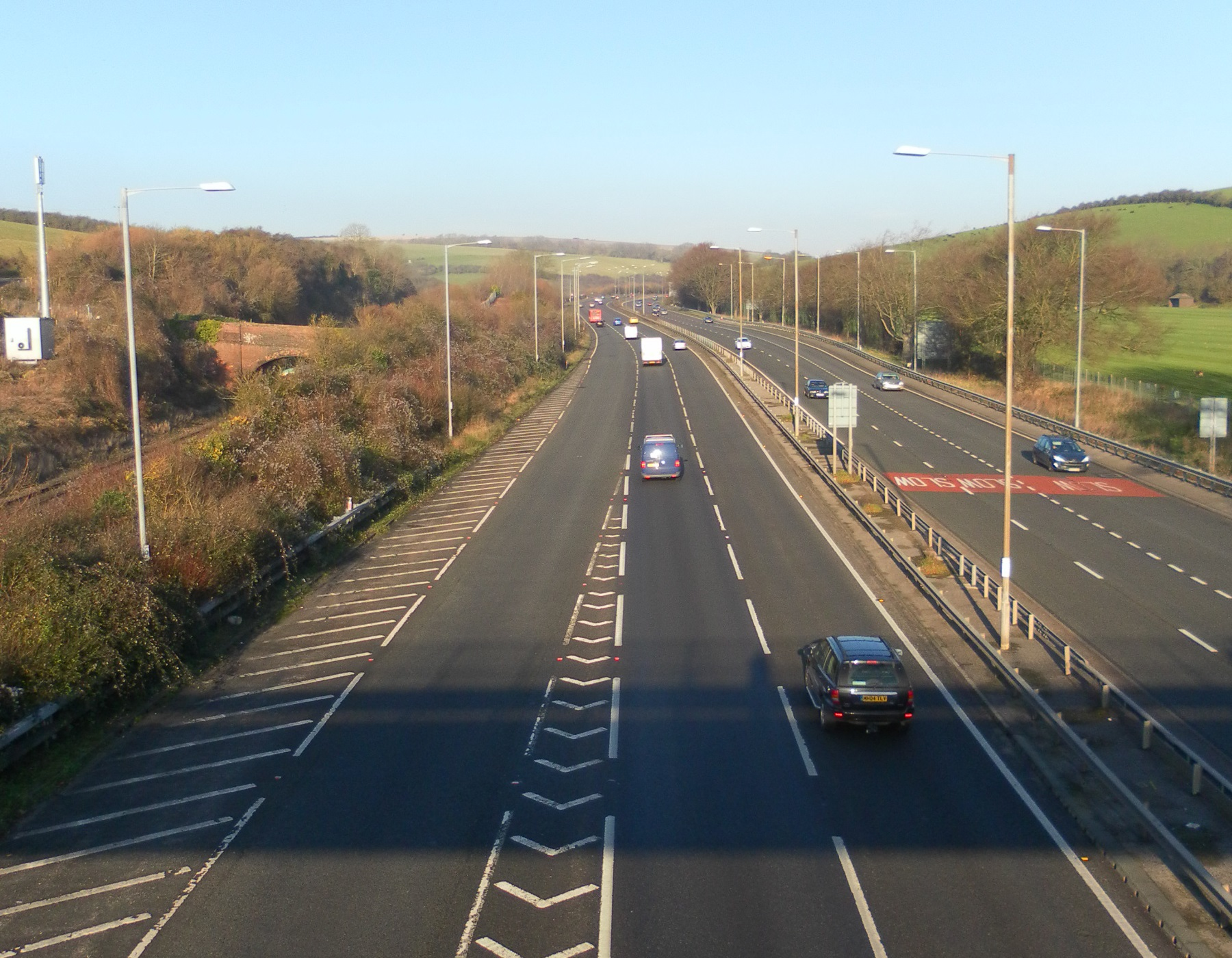
The Brighton Main Line railway (left) and A23 road link Brighton with London.

Brighton has several railway stations, many bus routes, coach services and taxis. A Rapid Transport System has been under consideration for some years. Trolleybuses, trams, ferries and hydrofoil services have operated in the past.

=== Roads ===
Brighton is connected to the trunk road network by the A23 (London Road) northwards, and by two east–west routes: the A259 along the coast and the A27 trunk route inland which joins the M27 motorway near Portsmouth. The A23 joins the M23 motorway at Pease Pottage near Gatwick Airport. The A27 originally ran through the urban area along Old Shoreham Road and Lewes Road, but it now follows the route of the Brighton Bypass (final section opened in 1992) and the old alignment has become the A270. A bypass was first proposed in 1932, six routes were submitted for approval in 1973, and the Department of the Environment published its recommended route in 1980. Public inquiries took place in 1983 and 1987, construction started in 1989 and the first section—between London Road at Patcham and the road to Devil's Dyke—opened in summer 1991.

By 1985, there were about 5,000 parking spaces in central Brighton. The largest car parks are at London Road, King Street and the Churchill Square/Regency Road/Russell Road complex. In 1969, a 520-space multi-storey car park was built beneath the central gardens of Regency Square.

=== Railway ===
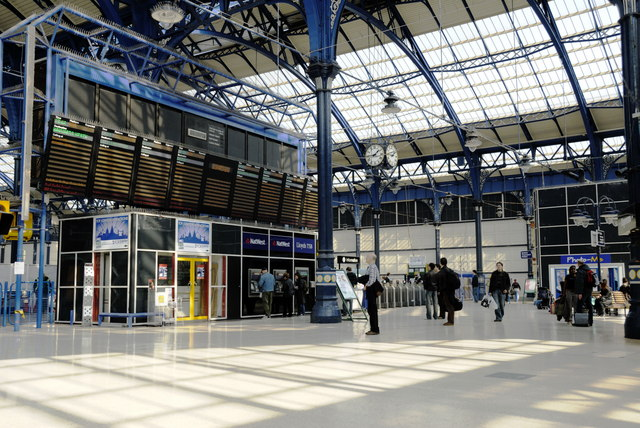
Brighton station concourse

Frequent trains operate from Brighton railway station. Many Brighton residents commute to work in London and destinations include London Victoria, London Bridge and St Pancras. Most trains serve Gatwick Airport and those operated by Thameslink continue to St Albans City, Luton, Luton Airport Parkway, Bedford and Cambridge. The fastest service from London Victoria takes 51 minutes. The West Coastway Line serves stations to Portsmouth, and Southampton; the East Coastway Line runs via Lewes to Newhaven, Eastbourne, and Hastings, crossing the landmark London Road viaduct en route and providing "a dramatic high-level view" of Brighton. A wider range of long-distance destinations was served until 2007–08 when rationalisation caused the ending of InterCity services via Kensington Olympia and Reading to Birmingham, Manchester and Edinburgh.

=== Buses ===
Until deregulation in 1986, bus services in Brighton were provided by Southdown Motor Services and Brighton Borough Transport under a joint arrangement called Brighton Area Transport Services. Southdown were part of the nationalised NBC group and were based at Freshfield Road in the Kemptown area; Brighton Borough Transport were owned by the council and used the former tram depot at Lewes Road as their headquarters. Joint tickets were available and revenue was shared. The Brighton & Hove Bus Company, owned by the Go-Ahead Group since 1993, now runs most bus services in Brighton. It has a fleet of about 280 buses. Compass Travel, The Big Lemon, Metrobus, Stagecoach South operate services to central Brighton. The city had 1,184 bus stops in 2012, 456 of which had a shelter. Real-time travel information displays are provided at many stops.

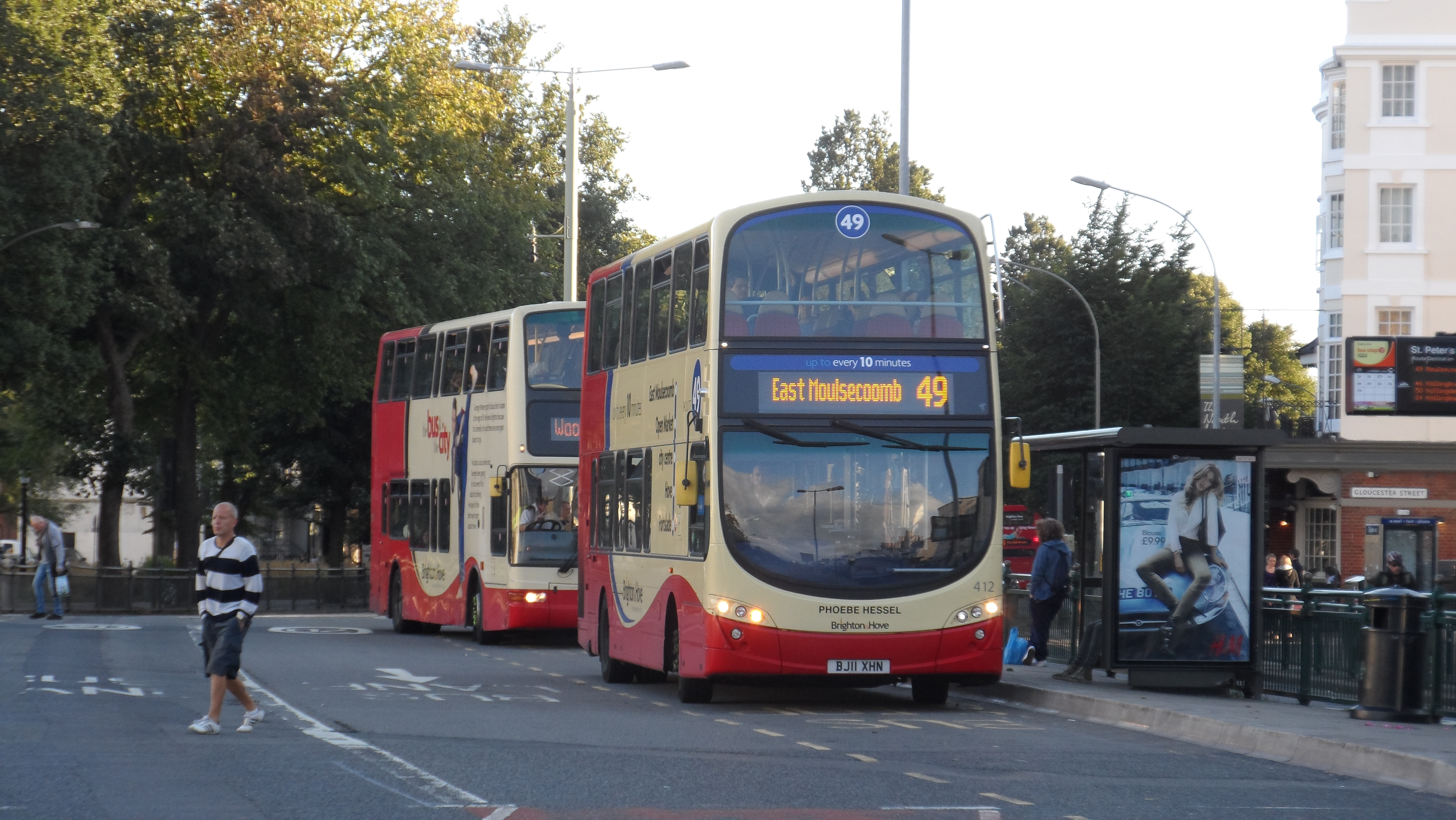
A Brighton & Hove bus service to East Moulsecoomb

The only park and ride facility in Brighton is based at the Withdean Stadium. It does not offer a dedicated shuttle bus service: intending passengers must join the Brighton & Hove Bus Company's route 27 service to Saltdean—which travels via Brighton railway station, the Clock Tower and Old Steine—and pay standard fares. The 20-year City Plan released in January 2013 ruled out an official park-and-ride facility, stating it would be an "inefficient use of public money, particularly in an era of declining car use". Councillors and residents in Woodingdean and Rottingdean have claimed that streets and car parks in those areas have become unofficial park-and-ride sites: drivers park for free and take buses into the city centre.

=== Air ===
Shoreham Airport, which offers chartered and scheduled flights using light aircraft, is 9 mi (14 km) west of Brighton near the town of Shoreham-by-Sea. In 1971, the borough councils of Worthing, Hove and Brighton bought it and operated it jointly as a municipal airport, but since 2006 it has been privately owned. Gatwick Airport, one of Britain's major international airports, is 30 mi (48 km) north on the A23; regular coach and rail services operate from Brighton.

== Notable people ==
- Lily Agg, footballer
- ArrDee, rapper
- Michael Ashburner, geneticist
- Bald and Bankrupt, travel vlogger
- Zoe Ball, entertainer
- Brian Behan, writer and trade unionist
- Nick Berry, actor and singer
- Cate Blanchett, actress
- Laurence Rickard, actor and screenwriter
- Raymond Briggs, illustrator
- Dora Bryan, actress
- George Burchett, tattoo artist
- Tanya Byrne, writer
- Julian Cash, professional tennis player
- Nick Cave, musician
- Gwendoline Christie, actress
- Steve Coogan, actor and comedian
- Norman Cook / Fatboy Slim, DJ
- Richard P. Cook, artist
- Robin Cousins, ice skater
- Luke Cresswell, percussionist
- Alfie Deyes, YouTuber
- Charles Dickens, author
- Maude Dickinson, inventor
- Henrietta A. Duff, poet
- Lewis Dunk, footballer
- E. S. Elliott, writer
- Chris Eubank, boxer
- Anubis Finch, drag queen
- David Gilmour, musician
- Dave Greenfield, musician
- Cyriak Harris, animator, artist, composer, and author
- Elliott Hasler, director
- Ben Hawes, triple Olympian
- David Henty, former master forger
- Jane Horrocks, actress
- Jacksepticeye, YouTuber
- Peter James, author
- Mike Kerr, musician
- Rudyard Kipling, author
- Marzia Kjellberg, internet personality
- Joan Lazzarani, sculptor, musician and intermedia performance artist
- Joshua Le Gallienne, artist, predominantly in sculpture
- Charles Leggett, music cornetist
- Alice Litman, transgender woman
- Emma Lomax, composer and pianist
- Alec MacKelden, British Army officer and Australian businessman
- Garnt Maneetapho, YouTuber, known online as "Gigguk"
- James Marriott, musician and YouTuber
- Heather Mills, model
- Isaiah Aram Minasian, violinist, cellist and orchestrator
- Robert Charles Moon, ophthalmologist and publisher of books for the blind using Moon type
- John Nathan-Turner, producer
- David Pearce, transhumanist philosopher
- PewDiePie, YouTuber
- The Prince Regent / George IV, royal
- Philip Proudfoot, anthropologist and politician
- Ren, musician
- Clara Ross, composer
- Victor Spinetti, actor
- Ben Thatcher, musician
- Frank Thewlis, Methodist minister
- TommyInnit, YouTuber and streamer
- Tubbo, YouTuber and streamer
- Doreen Valiente, Wiccan writer
- Johnny Wakelin, musician
- David Walliams, comedian, actor and writer
- Joe Wilkinson, comedian
- Zoella, YouTuber

== See also ==
- List of people from Brighton and Hove
- Category:Musicians from Brighton and Hove
- Brighton Borough Council elections for the political history of the former borough council which governed the town from 1974 to 1997.
