= Adam Yosef =

British journalist and political activist (born 1981)

- Born: September 1981 (age 45); Marston Green, England
- Occupation: Journalist
- Years active: 2002–present
- Known for: Journalism and political activism

Adam Yosef (born September 1981) is a British journalist, photojournalist and political activist.

== Background ==
Yosef was born in September 1981 in Marston Green, England and is of South Asian and Middle Eastern heritage, with family from India, Pakistan, Kashmir and Iraq. His immediate family is British and Spanish.

== Activism ==
In 2003, Yosef co-founded the interfaith Saltley Gate Peace Group, a community peace initiative which was formed in response to the threat of war in Iraq as a part of the growing peace movement in Britain following 9/11, and he was Community & Interfaith Liaison Officer for the Birmingham Stop the War Coalition during this period.

He has been actively involved in community work which is related to the Lozells riots, the Alum Rock terror raids and campaigning against radical groups in the Midlands.

In his early twenties, Yosef slept rough on the streets of London before being assisted by The Salvation Army. As a result, founded the Birmingham Food Drive in 2012, which regularly provides food, clothes and essential items to homeless people in the city, and is an active supporter of youth homelessness charity St Basils. He has also written for Pavement, the magazine for the rough sleepers in the UK.

Between 2011 and 2017, Yosef co-organised the Birmingham Zombie Walk, an annual event which raised thousands of pounds for Birmingham Children's Hospital, as part of an ongoing commitment to the charity.

In 2015, Yosef co-founded the Birmingham chapter of the national anti-racism organisation Stand Up To Racism. He is an organiser for Stop the War Coalition.

In 2021, Yosef co-founded Birmingham Against LGBTQI+ Hate, informally and commonly known as Brum Against Hate, alongside activists Saima Razzaq and Salman Mirza. The group organises rallies against homophobic attacks in the city and has called on city leaders to facilitate better relationships between communities.

== Public media career ==
=== PR and communications ===
Between 2003 and 2004, Yosef was employed by the Birmingham Central Mosque as a Press & Public Relations representative. He regularly appeared as spokesperson for the trust alongside its chairman, Dr Mohammad Naseem.

From 2005, he was Press Officer for politician Salma Yaqoob, the former leader of the Respect Party. He was also Press & Social Media Officer for Yaqoob during the 2010 general election.

=== Journalism ===
Between 2005 and 2006, Yosef was senior journalist with The Asian Today and Desi Xpress, owned by Urban Media.

In 2007, Yosef was appointed deputy editor of national entertainment magazine Ikonz. In 2008, he became a columnist for Fusian magazine.

In July 2009, Yosef launched I Am Birmingham, an independent news website serving the West Midlands region, of which he is Editor-in-Chief.

In August 2011, he was attacked by rioters while covering the 2011 England riots, during which he suffered a cut to the face and a swollen jaw.

Yosef has regularly written for the BBC, creating content highlighting issues of socio-politics, diversity, culture, racism and religion. He has also written for the Birmingham Mail, Jewish news website The Forward, Muslim news website IlmFeed, and has had his work featured in The Washington Post, The Mirror, and Al Jazeera.

== Controversies ==
=== Homophobic comments ===
- In the December 2005 issue of the British Asian newspaper Desi Xpress (Issue 42), he made homophobic remarks about the UK's new civil partnership law for same-sex couples, including remarks such as "Hmm... gay weddings... Gay people and commitment? I don't think so... They'll be shagging the neighbours before they even cut the cake. Bad idea I'm afraid. Great way of evading tax though...." He later apologised and retracted his comments in the same newspaper, claiming his opinions were misinterpreted.

=== Peter Tatchell ===
- In January 2006, he subsequently wrote another article for the same newspaper on bigotry, in which he named Peter Tatchell, leader of OutRage!, Nick Griffin, the leader of the British National Party, and Omar Bakri Mohammed, leader of Al-Muhajiroun, as the three top "hate filled bigots" in the United Kingdom. He also said that Tatchell "needs a good slap in the face" and that he and his "queer campaign army" should "pack their bent bags and head back to Australia." After complaints that he was homophobic and inciting violence, Yosef claimed that he had "misspoken" and apologised for any perceived homophobia, but maintained the view that Tatchell was a bigot saying that the reference to Australia was intended as a reference to the Cronulla riots in Sydney. The newspaper gave Tatchell a full-page right of reply.
- Tribune magazine, allied to the left of the Labour Party, criticised Yosef and suggested his NUJ card should be withdrawn. He was further described as "bigoted" and "hate-driven" by Progress magazine, which is allied to the Blairite faction of the Labour Party and criticised by the Green Party, of which Tatchell is a member. Respect defended Yosef, citing his BBC articles supporting LGBT pride. The party stated it opposed "homophobia and anti-gay violence". In October 2009, Yosef pledged his formal support to Tatchell's General Election parliamentary candidacy for the Green Party of England and Wales, calling for the left to "embrace a mutual personal and political commitment towards equality and human rights". Yosef and Tatchell have met several times since, at Pride events and Tatchell has been interviewed by Yosef in his capacity as a journalist.
- Yosef has described his comments at the time as "satire" and "self-depreciation" but admits this became "disjointed" and lost in a charge that focused on his religious identity rather than his sexual identity. In a June 2020 Twitter thread, he clarified: "This has been previously stated but when I originally wrote those words/comments around 15 years ago, they featured in several different articles and disjointed opinion segments with a combination of satire, self-deprecation, sarcasm and tabloid sensationalism. Isolated and within context, much of what was written wasn't an issue and raised no eyebrows, until paired with a later piece I wrote that included mention of campaigner Peter Tatchell. This piece panders to an editorial style I accepted was problematic and apologised for."
- He has challenged accusations of homophobia which he states overlook his work in the LGBT+ community in favour of a radical Muslim stereotype narrative: "The claim and notion that I was or am homophobic is wrong. I have never been homophobic. The idea that I was homophobic until I 'came out', as mentioned above, is false, without evidence and extremely dangerous. It plays into a racial and religious stereotype, the trope of a 'conservative/repressed/religious/self-hating queer' with an inferior and intolerant culture or faith. This is false. I have never been 'in' as it were and have always personally identified as queer without any kind of self-denial. Prior to the controversy over the PT [Peter Tatchell] column, I wrote a number of articles about LGBT issues and identity, including reviews of Pride marches and the inclusion of early LGBT stories in South Asian/Arab media platforms; and introducing LGBT listings in these, which was rare. "There was no doubt to those who knew and know me as to where I stood and stand on LGBT+ rights and identity. However I was also very aware of how I was perceived within the same community as a POC/Muslim/queer/bisexual/pansexual individual. It wasn't often favourably."

=== Labour Party ===
- In October 2019, public letters written by LGBT+ Labour and LGBT+ Labour West Midlands accusing West Midlands mayoral candidate Salma Yaqoob of homophobia, included claims Yosef was previously employed by Yaqoob and had "called for violence against LGBT+ activists". The letters were shared and endorsed by Labour MPs Wes Streeting and Ben Bradshaw. Yaqoob defended her relationship with Yosef, stating: "Adam is a member of the LGBTQ+ community and is an active campaigner for LGBTQ+ rights, who was pivotal in promoting Muslim groups' involvement in Birmingham Pride." Yaqoob's responses to the points made in the letters were backed by LGBT+ activists Owen Jones, Saima Razzaq and UK Black Pride Director Pav Akhtar, who described Yaqoob as an ally. LGBT+ Labour West Midlands has since removed the original letter from their Twitter account.

== Politics ==
Yosef is a former member of the Respect Party, campaigning for the party in Birmingham. He supported the Green Party of England and Wales in October 2009.

== Personal life ==
Yosef is Muslim and identifies as pansexual.

== Honours ==
In October 2007, Yosef was included in Ikonz magazine's special Halloween photo shoot, in which he was transformed into a The Crow. He was featured alongside actors from television soap Hollyoaks and presenters from the BBC Asian Network.

In March 2008, he was included in the top 50 most eligible bachelors list for Asian Woman magazine.

In November 2017, he was nominated and shortlisted for the Inspirational Man accolade at the Birmingham Inspiration Awards.

In September 2018, Yosef was nominated and shortlisted for the Excellence in Media accolade at The Birmingham Awards.

In 2019 and 2021, he was nominated in the Positive Role Model (LGBT) category for the National Diversity Awards.

In 2020, Yosef was presented with an honorary award for 'Outstanding Contribution to LGBTQ+ Equality' award by Midlands Zone magazine.
