= Bolton 7 =

Group of men convicted of sexual offences for consensual group sex

The Bolton 7 were a group of gay and bisexual men who were convicted on 12 January 1998 in the United Kingdom before Judge Michael Lever at Bolton Crown Court of the offences of gross indecency under the Sexual Offences Act 1956. Although gay sex was partially decriminalised by the Sexual Offences Act 1967, they were all convicted under section 13 of the 1956 Act because more than two men had sex together, which was still illegal. One of the participants (Craig Turner) was also six months under the statutory age of consent for male gay sex: at the time, such an age was set at 18, while the heterosexual and lesbian age of consent was instead set at 16.

== Offences ==
Under the provisions of the 1967 Act, the age of consent for gay sex was different from that of the heterosexual age of consent of 16, and had only been reduced from 21 to 18 by the Criminal Justice and Public Order Act 1994. Equivalent heterosexual behaviour was not a crime.

The offences only came to light after police seized videos of the men having sex, which they had filmed for their own personal use. All the men were either lovers, ex-boyfriends, or friends of friends.

== Sentences ==
During sentencing on 20 February 1998 Gary Abdie, David Godfrey, Mark Love and Jonathan Moore (all of whom were in their early 20s), and Craig Turner (17 at the time of the offences but 18 when he appeared in court) were given probation and community service orders. The judge gave Norman Williams a two-year suspended prison sentence and Terry Connell received a nine-month suspended sentence and was ordered to pay £500 towards the cost of the prosecution. Moore (20), Williams (33) and Connell (55) were also required to sign the Violent and Sex Offender Register for the age of consent offences committed with Turner. Estimates of the overall cost of the prosecution were in the region of £500,000.

None of the defendants received custodial sentences, following a high-profile campaign led by gay human rights group OutRage!. Campaigner Peter Tatchell was present in the public gallery throughout the trial, having spearheaded a large nationally and locally networked campaign in support of the defendants and led protests against their prosecution, in alliance with Stonewall collectively raising awareness of the case, throughout broader society. Over 400 letters were presented to the court in support of the men including those from MPs, Bishops and human rights groups. The letters urged the judge not to impose a custodial sentence, with one group, Amnesty International, pledging to declare the men prisoners of conscience should they be imprisoned.

== Aftermath ==
In 2000, six of the men appealed to the European Court of Human Rights arguing that the prosecutions against them had violated their rights under the European Convention on Human Rights by interfering with the right to respect for private and family life under article 8 of the convention. In 2001, the Home Office offered an out of court settlement of £15,000 to six of the men, with a promise to change the law. As all charges against Williams had been dropped, he was not awarded any compensation.

Legislation subsequently introduced by the Labour government broadly equalised the treatment of homosexual and heterosexual behaviours in criminal law. The Sexual Offences (Amendment) Act 2000 equalised the age of consent for gay sex with that of the heterosexual age of consent, which is now 16 for both. The Sexual Offences Act 2003, though subject to some controversy, introduced an overhaul in the way sexual offences are dealt with by the police and courts, replacing provisions that date as far back to the 1956 legislation. The offences of gross indecency and buggery have been repealed and sexual activity between more than two men is no longer a crime in the United Kingdom.

== See also ==
- Age-of-consent reform in the United Kingdom
