= Desi Xpress =

UK weekly entertainment newspaper

Desi Xpress newspaper

Desi Xpress was a weekly national entertainment newspaper, published in the United Kingdom by Urban Media Limited.

== Background ==
Desi Xpress was first launched in the Midlands region in England in September 2004 before becoming national in September 2005.

The entertainment weekly catered predominantly to the British South-Asian community and its tabloid format aimed to appeal to readers between the ages of 16 and 35.

In the UK, Asian music and television stars have begun to enjoy wider mainstream success. Desi Xpress claimed to provide a platform for these stars and a source for their readers to understand and follow the Asian entertainment scene. It also explored the wider Bollywood scene.

== Controversy ==
- In June 2005, the Jewish community became upset following an interview conducted by the newspaper in which top Bollywood actress Rani Mukherjee was asked to name her idol. Mukherjee's response of "Adolf Hitler" angered religious leaders in India and brought criticism from director Alex Hayim. Desi Xpress spokesperson Zakia Yousaf defended the actress saying, "We do not believe the actress meant it in that she truly idolised him. We believe she is intrigued as to why he was the way he was."
- The publication again came under fire in December 2005 following remarks made by its weekly columnist Adam Yosef about same-sex civil partnerships which were set to become legal in Britain. Yosef wrote, "Hmmm... gay weddings... Gay people and commitment? I don't think so... They'll be shagg*ng the neighbours before they even cut the cake. Bad idea I'm afraid. Great way of evading tax though....". The remarks were attacked by gay human rights activist Peter Tatchell and his OutRage! organisation.
- In January 2006, the newspaper published a column by Yosef which was seen as an attack on Mr Tatchell himself. The journalist was accused of "homophobia and xenophobia" after comparing activist Tatchell with Nick Griffin, leader of the British National Party (BNP) and Omar Bakri Mohammed, leader of Al-Muhajiroun. Stewart C. Dawson of lobby group Gay Action Media Watch launched an international campaign against Desi Xpress and Adam Yosef. The campaign was subsequently backed by Peter Tatchell, OutRage! and the Green Party of England and Wales. Following further criticism from gay media outlets and factions of the Labour Party, Desi Xpress and Yosef issued an apology. In May 2006, Peter Tatchell wrote a full page article for the newspaper.

== Suspension ==
- In June 2006, Desi Xpress editor Reena Combo left the newspaper to "pursue other interests".
- In August 2006, publication of the tabloid newspaper was temporarily suspended by Urban Media Ltd. It returned later that year as a pull-out supplement in The Asian Today with former sub-editor Zakia Yousaf as the new editor.

== Editorial ==
Reena Combo was the editor of Desi Xpress. Zakia Yousaf was the sub-editor. Columnists and contributors included radio Club Asia DJ Missy D, Bollywood correspondent Viral Bhayani, Beautician Naveeda, socio-political observer Adam Yosef and regular columnists from the BBC Asian Network.
