= Peter Tatchell =

Australian-born British human rights campaigner (born 1952)

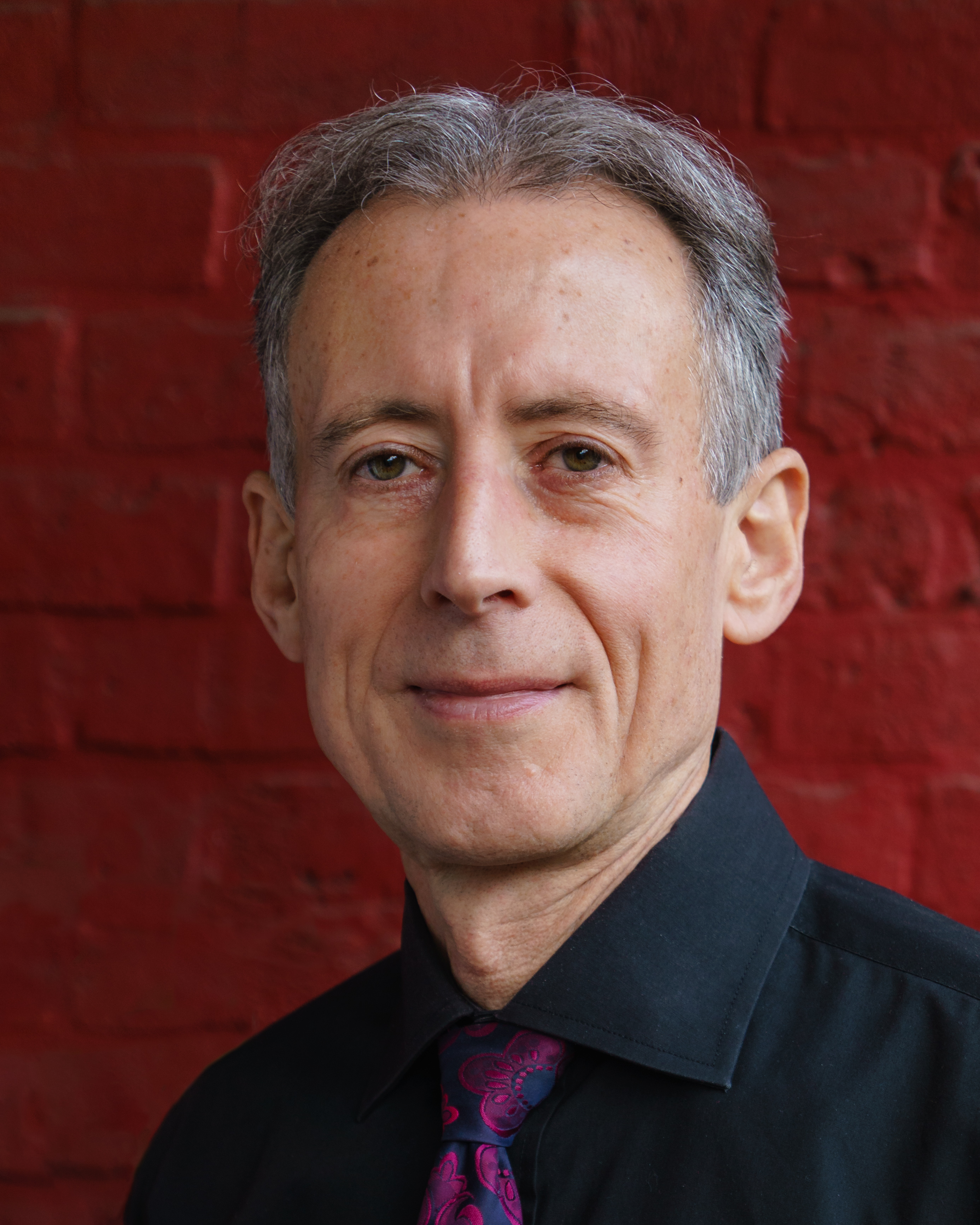
- Tatchell in 2016
- Born: Peter Gary Tatchell; 25 January 1952 (age 74); Melbourne, Victoria, Australia
- Education: University of North London
- Occupations: Human rights campaigner; journalist
- Political party: Green Party (since 2004); Independent (2000–2004); Labour (1978–2000)
- Peter Tatchell's voice Recorded November 2018
- Website: www.petertatchell.net

Peter Gary Tatchell (born 25 January 1952) is an Australian-born British human rights campaigner, best known for his work with LGBTQ social movements.

Tatchell was selected as the Labour Party's parliamentary candidate for Bermondsey in 1981. He was then denounced by party leader Michael Foot for ostensibly supporting extra-parliamentary action against the Thatcher government. Labour subsequently allowed him to stand in the Bermondsey by-election in February 1983, in which the party lost the seat to the Liberals. In the 1990s he campaigned for LGBTQ rights through the direct action group OutRage!, which he co-founded. He has worked on various campaigns, such as Stop Murder Music against music lyrics allegedly inciting violence against LGBT people and writes and broadcasts on various human rights and social justice issues. He attempted a citizen's arrest of the president of Zimbabwe Robert Mugabe in 1999 and again in 2001.

In April 2004, Tatchell joined the Green Party of England and Wales and in 2007 was selected as prospective Parliamentary candidate in the constituency of Oxford East, but in December 2009 he stood down due to brain damage acquired mainly during protests, as well as from a bus accident. Since 2011, he has been Director of the Peter Tatchell Foundation. He has taken part in over 30 debates at the Oxford Union, encompassing a wide range of issues such as patriotism, Thatcherism and university safe spaces.

== Early life ==
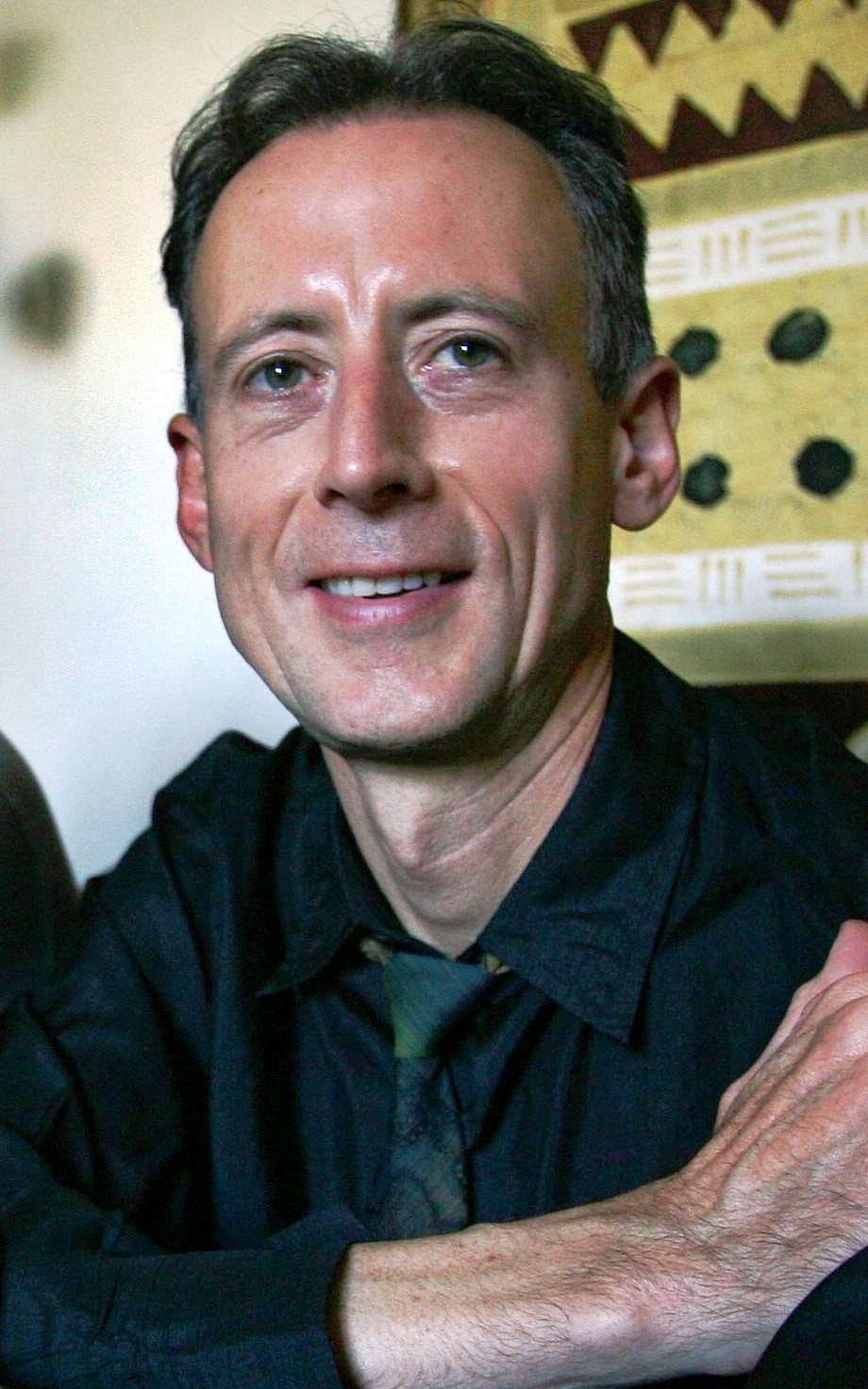
Tatchell at his home in 2007

Tatchell was born in Melbourne, Australia. His father was a lathe operator and his mother worked in a biscuit factory. His parents divorced when he was four and his mother remarried soon afterwards. He had a half sister and brothers.

Since the family finances were strained by medical bills, he had to leave school at 16 in 1968. He started work as a sign-writer and window-dresser in department stores. Tatchell claims to have incorporated the theatricality of these displays into his activism.

Raised as a Christian, Tatchell says that he "ditched [his] faith a long time ago" and is an atheist. It has been wrongly reported that Tatchell is a vegan; however, Tatchell himself has stated that although he eats no meat, he does eat eggs, cheese, and, according to Richard Fairbrass, wild salmon.

He became interested in outdoor adventurous activities such as surfing and mountain climbing. Speaking on BBC Radio 4's Any Questions about how insurance and legal risks were making British teachers reluctant to take pupils on outdoor adventures, he said outdoor activities helped him develop the courage to take political risks in adult life.

=== Campaigns in Australia ===
Tatchell's political activity began at Mount Waverley Secondary College, where in 1967 he launched campaigns in support of Australia's Aboriginal people. Tatchell was elected secretary of the school's Student Representative Council. In his final year in 1968, as school captain, he took the lead in setting up a scholarship scheme for Aboriginal people and led a campaign for Aboriginal land rights. These activities led the headmaster to claim he had been manipulated by communists.

Prompted by the impending hanging of Ronald Ryan in 1967, a 15-year old Tatchell protested against the use of the death sentence, writing to the press and spraying graffiti to raise awareness of the issue. Ryan was convicted of killing a prison warder while escaping from Pentridge Prison in Coburg, Victoria. Tatchell wrote that the trajectory of the bullet through the warder's body made it unlikely that Ryan could have fired the fatal shot, casting doubt on the conviction. His protests were unsuccessful.

In 1968, Tatchell began campaigning against the American and Australian involvement in the Vietnam War, in his view a war of aggression in support of a "brutal and corrupt dictatorship" responsible for torture and executions. The Victoria state government and Melbourne city council attempted to suppress the anti-Vietnam War campaign by banning street leafleting and taking police action against anti-war demonstrations.

In 2004, he proposed the renaming of Australian capital cities with their Aboriginal place names.

=== Gay Liberation Front ===
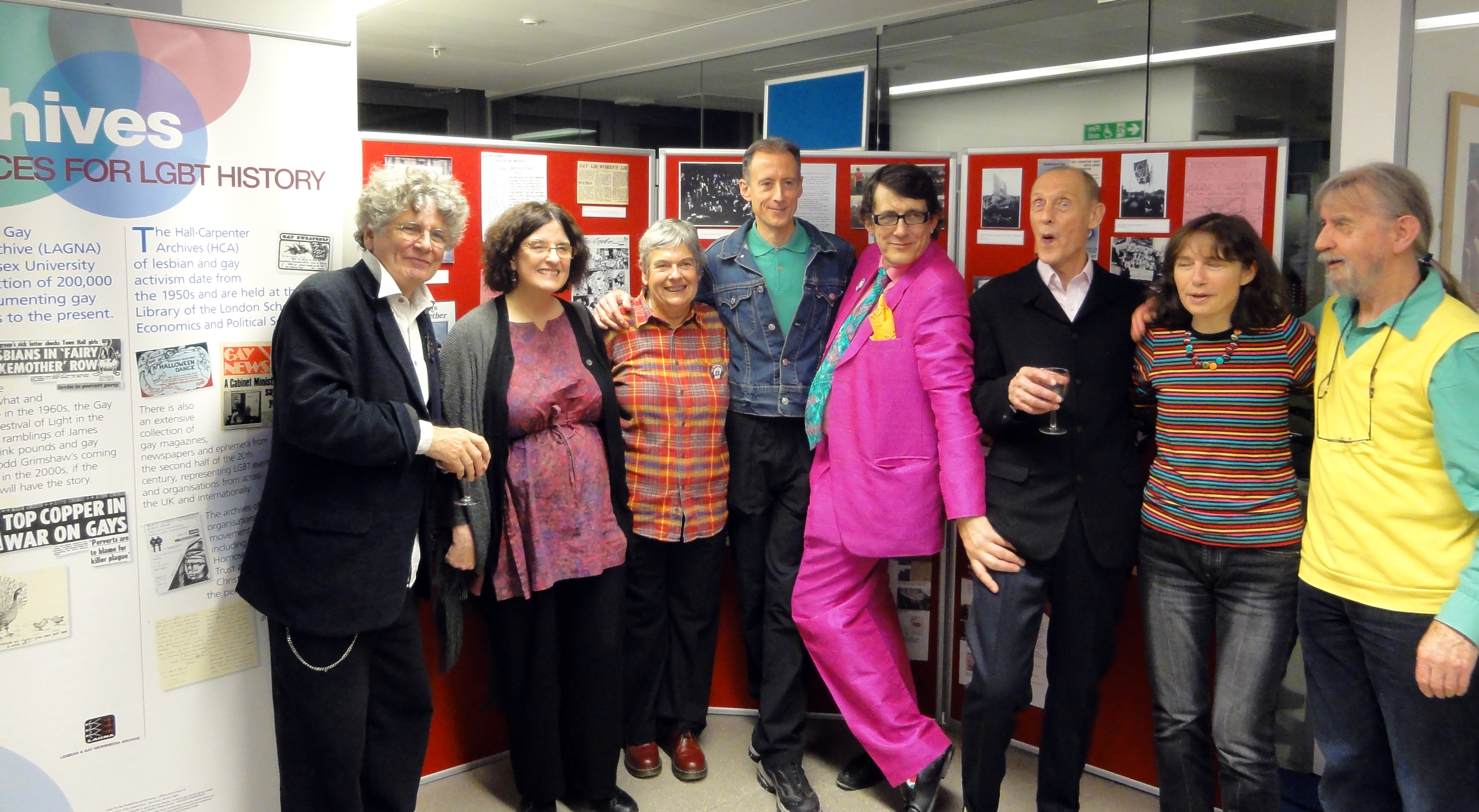
Original UK Gay Liberation Front activists, including Bette Bourne (on the left), at an LSE 40th anniversary celebration. Tatchell is fourth from the left.

To avoid conscription into the Australian Army, Tatchell moved to London in 1971. He had opened up about being gay in 1969, and in London became a leading member of the Gay Liberation Front (GLF) until its 1974 collapse. During this time Tatchell was prominent in organising sit-ins at pubs that refused to serve "poofs" and protests against police harassment and the medical classification of homosexuality as an illness. With others, he helped organise Britain's first Gay Pride march in 1972.

In 1973, he attended the 10th World Youth Festival in East Berlin on GLF's behalf. His plans to protest at the festival were not well received by either the British delegation or the GDR hosts, but he was eventually allowed to give a speech at Humboldt University. His lecture was subject to various disruptions; it ended in his denunciation as a "troublemaker" by a member of the audience. The following day, Tatchell attempted to hand out leaflets at a concert: an official of the Free German Youth objected and encouraged fellow concert-goers to destroy the leaflets. Tatchell intended to carry a placard advocating gay rights at the closing rally of the festival. The British delegation incorrectly translated the placard to read "East Germany persecutes homosexuals"; this was put to a vote and the majority decided the placard was not acceptable. Yet, in defiance of the collective decision, Tatchell carried the placard anyway and was then beaten. The placard was torn in half.

Tatchell later claimed that this was the first time gay liberation politics were publicly disseminated and discussed in a communist country, although he noted that, in terms of decriminalisation and the age of consent, gay men had greater rights in East Germany at the time than much of the West.

Describing his time in the Gay Liberation Front, he wrote in The Guardian that:

[The] GLF was a glorious, enthusiastic and often chaotic mix of anarchists, hippies, leftwingers, feminists, liberals and counter-culturalists. Despite our differences, we shared a radical idealism—a dream of what the world could and should be—free from not just homophobia but the whole sex-shame culture, which oppressed straights as much as LGBTs. We were sexual liberationists and social revolutionaries, out to turn the world upside down. ... GLF's main aim was never equality within the status quo. ... GLF's strategy for queer emancipation was to change society's values and norms, rather than adapt to them. We sought a cultural revolution to overturn centuries of male heterosexual domination and thereby free both queers and women. ... Forty years on, GLF's gender agenda has been partly won. ... Girlish boys and boyish girls don't get victimised as much as in times past. LGBT kids often now come out at the age of 12 or 14. While many are bullied, many others are not. The acceptance of sexual and gender diversity is increasing.

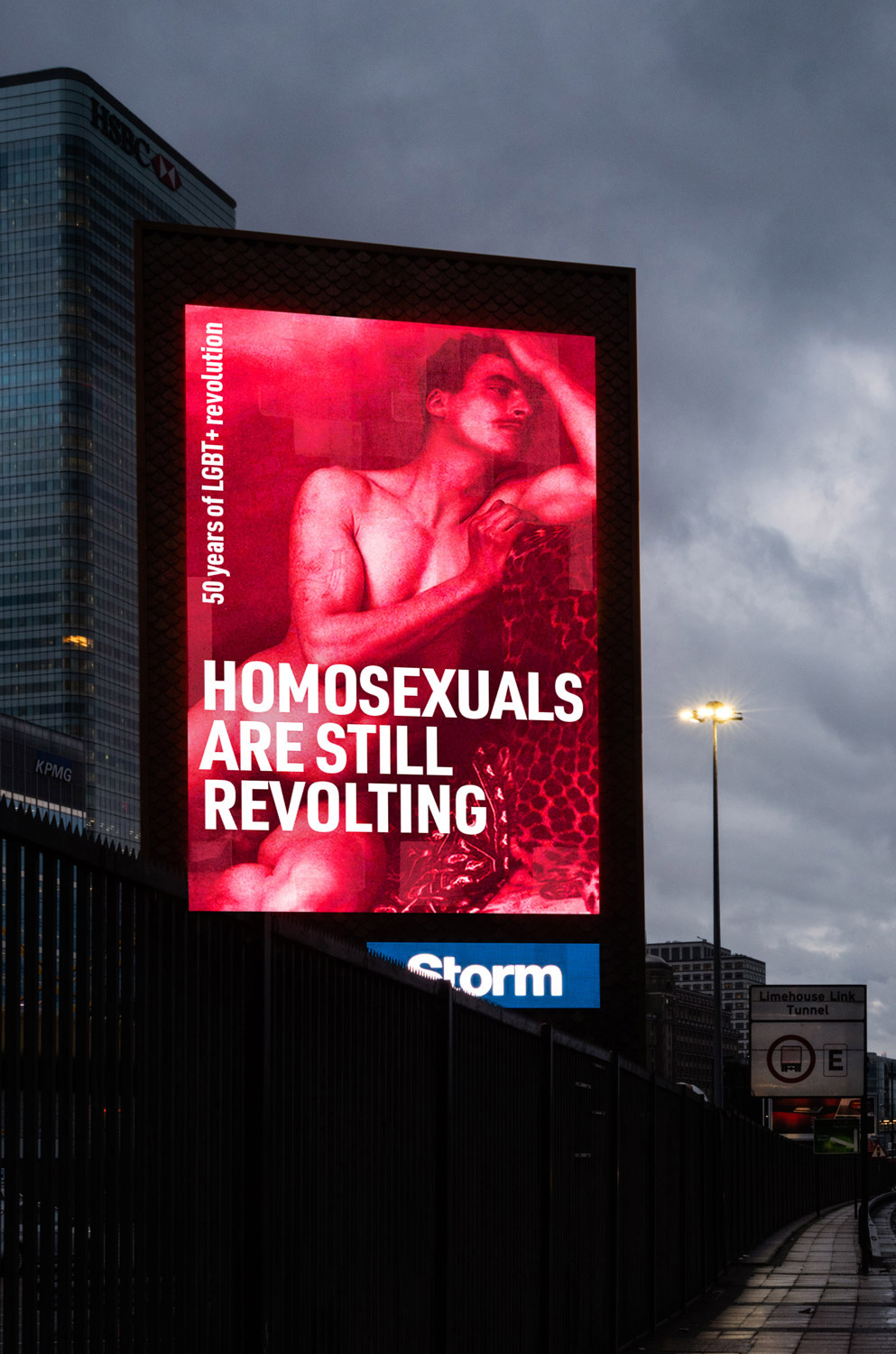
Tatchell's collaboration with public artist Martin Firrell to mark the 50th anniversary of the Gay Liberation Front in the UK (1970–2020)

Tatchell collaborated with public artist Martin Firrell to mark the 50th anniversary of the GLF in 2020. The artist's "Still Revolting" series drew on Tatchell's personal recollections of the GLF, quoting Tatchell's 1973 placard "Homosexuals Are Revolting" created by Tatchell for London Gay Pride. The artist's addition of the word 'still' reflects the truth that homosexuality is still regarded as intolerable by some and many LGBT+ people around the world are still struggling for acceptance, security and equality.

=== Graduation ===
After taking A levels at evening classes, he attended the Polytechnic of North London (PNL), now part of London Metropolitan University, where he obtained a 2:1 BSc (Hons) in sociology.

At PNL he was a member of the National Union of Students Gay Rights Campaign. On graduating he became a freelance journalist specialising in foreign stories, during which he publicised the Indonesian annexation of West Papua and child labour on British-owned tea farms in Malawi.

== Politics ==
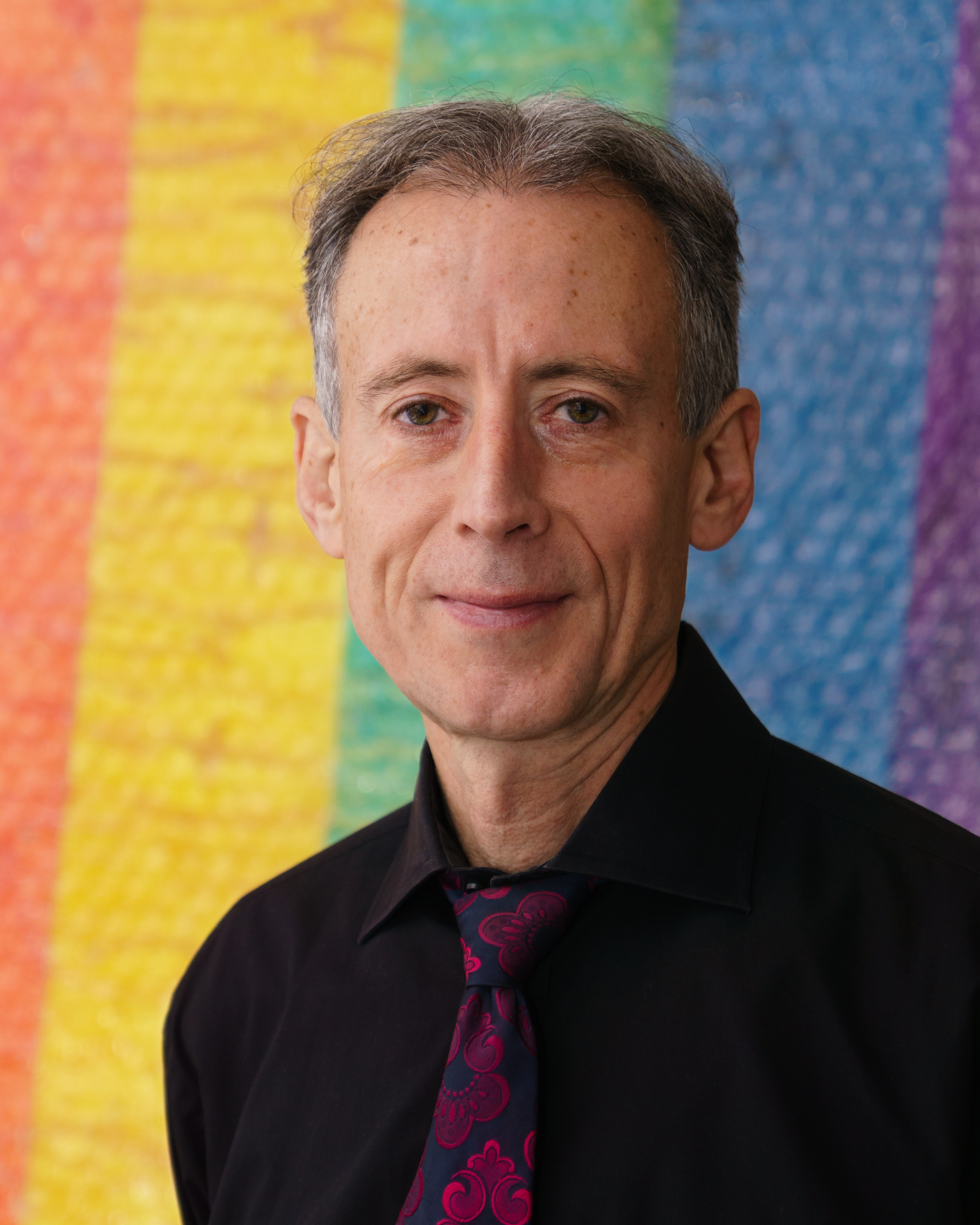
Tatchell with a rainbow flag, the international LGBT symbol

Tatchell popularised the phrase "sexual apartheid" to describe the separate laws that long existed for gays and heterosexuals.

=== Labour candidate for Bermondsey ===
In 1978, Tatchell joined the Labour Party and moved to a council flat in Bermondsey, south-east London. At the Bermondsey Constituency Labour Party's (CLP) AGM in February 1980, the left group won control and Tatchell was elected Secretary. When the sitting Labour Member of Parliament (MP), Bob Mellish, retired in 1982, Tatchell was selected as his successor, despite Arthur Latham, a former MP and former Chairman of the Tribune Group, being considered the favourite. While Militant was cited as the reason for Tatchell's selection, Tatchell disagrees and ascribes his selection to the support of the "older, 'born and bred' working class; the younger professional and intellectual members swung behind Latham".

In an article for a left-wing magazine, Tatchell urged the Labour Party to support direct action campaigning to challenge the Margaret Thatcher-led Tory government, stating "we must look to new more militant forms of extra-parliamentary opposition which involve mass popular participation and challenge the government's right to rule". Social Democratic Party MP James Wellbeloved, arguing the article was anti-Parliamentary, quoted it at Prime Minister's Questions in November 1981. Foot denounced Tatchell, stating that he would not be endorsed as a candidate and a vote at the Labour Party National Executive Committee denied Tatchell's endorsement. However, the Bermondsey Labour Party continued to support him and it was eventually agreed that when the selection was rerun, Tatchell would be eligible, and he duly won. When Mellish resigned from Parliament and triggered a by-election, Tatchell's candidacy was endorsed, and the ensuing campaign was regarded as one of the most homophobic in modern British history.

Tatchell was assaulted in the street, had his flat attacked, and had a death threat and a live bullet put through his letterbox in the night. Although the Bermondsey seat had long been a Labour stronghold, the Liberal candidate, Simon Hughes, won the election. During the campaign, Liberal canvassers were accused of stirring up homophobia on the doorsteps. Male Liberal workers campaigned wearing lapel badges with the words, "I've been kissed by Peter Tatchell" following the suggestion that he was attempting to hide his sexuality; this campaign was criticised by Roy Hattersley at a Labour news conference. One of Hughes' campaign leaflets claimed the election was "a straight choice" between Liberal and Labour. Hughes has since apologised for what may have been seen as an inadvertent slur and later came out as bisexual in 2006.

=== Democratic Defence ===
Tatchell published the book Democratic Defence in 1985. In it, he outlined his suggestions for a defence policy for the United Kingdom after it underwent nuclear disarmament. Tatchell argued that Britain's military was primarily organised on a strategy of basing troops abroad rather than defending Britain itself from outside attacks, which he claimed was a legacy of the British Empire.

Citing the difficulties that the British Army was facing in Northern Ireland during the Troubles, he argued that their current methods had proven ineffective against guerrilla warfare, along with arguing for UK military personnel to be allowed to join trade unions and political parties, and to end strict adherence to "petty regulations". He praised the Second World War-era British Home Guard as an example of a "citizens' army", as well as the armed forces of Sweden, Switzerland and Yugoslavia as positive examples for the UK military to emulate.

In the book, Tatchell also argued for a British withdrawal from NATO and for the establishment of a European Self-Defence Organisation, independent of both the United States, as he felt that Europe had become too dependent on their military protection, and the Soviet Union, which he condemned for their invasions of Czechoslovakia and of Afghanistan, as well as its internal repression. He quoted with approval Enoch Powell's argument that the threat from the Soviet Union to Britain was greatly exaggerated. The book was reviewed by the Times Literary Supplement in May 1985.

=== Green Party ===
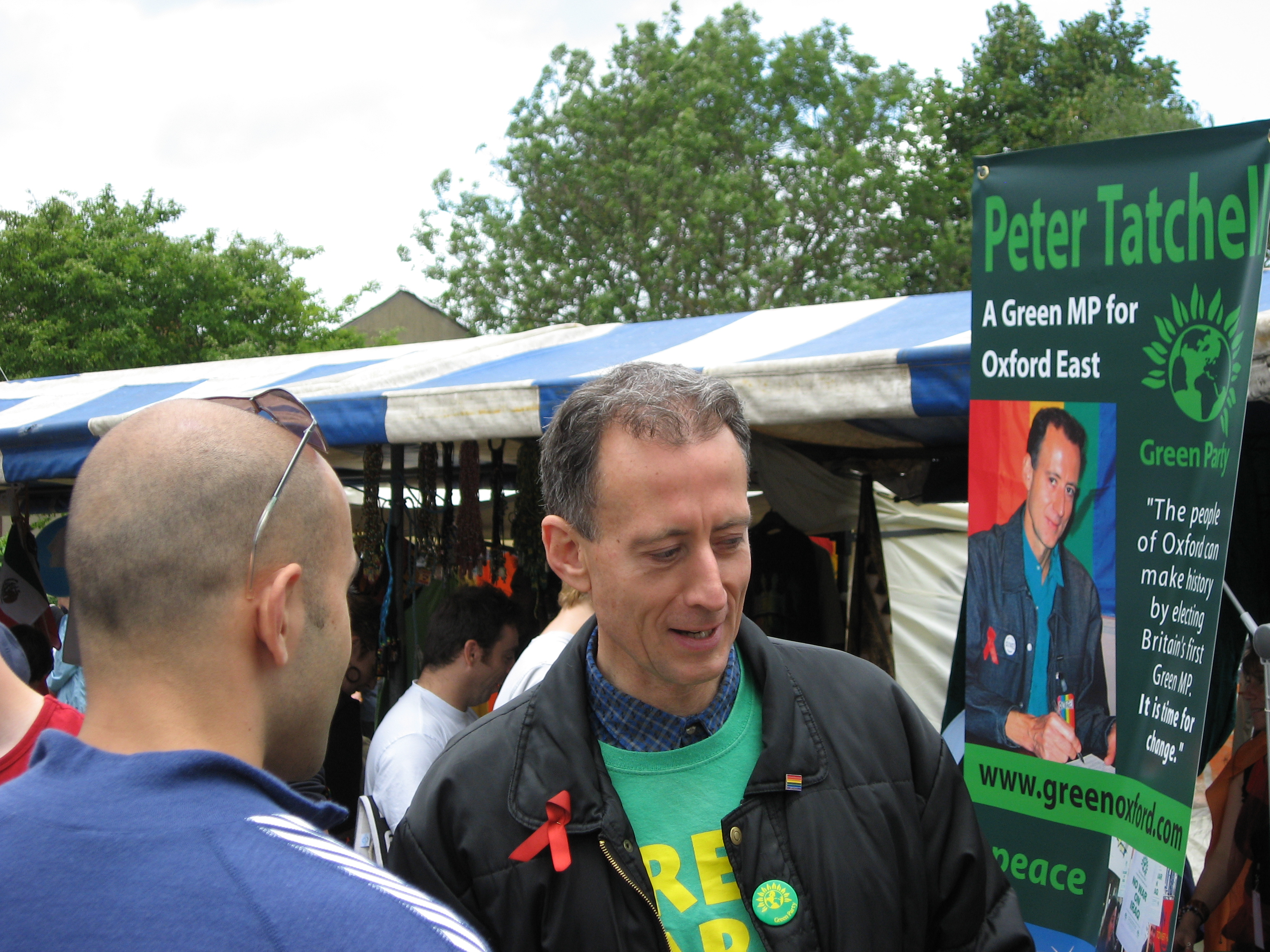
Tatchell at the Cowley Road Carnival in Oxford in July 2007

In February 2000, Tatchell resigned from Labour, citing the treatment of Ken Livingstone during the nomination of a candidate for Mayor of London, and of similar cases in the Scottish and Welsh elections, as evidence that the party "no longer has any mechanism for democratic involvement and transformation". He fought unsuccessfully for a seat on the London Assembly as an independent candidate within the Green Left grouping, in support of Livingstone.

On 7 April 2004, he joined the Green Party of England and Wales but did not envisage standing for election. However, in 2007, he became the party's parliamentary candidate for Oxford East. On 16 December 2009, he withdrew as a candidate claiming brain damage he says was caused by a bus accident as well as damage inflicted by Mugabe's bodyguards when Tatchell attempted to arrest him in 2001 in Brussels, and by neo-Nazis in Moscow.

Tatchell opposes nuclear power; instead he advocates concentrated solar power.

In Tribune, he pointed out the adverse effects of climate change: "By 2050, if climate change proceeds unchecked, England will no longer be a green and pleasant land. In between periods of prolonged scorching drought, we are likely to suffer widespread flooding."

For many years, he supported a green–red alliance. More recently, he helped launch the Green Left grouping within the Green Party. He urged links between trade unions and the Greens. On 27 April 2010, he urged Green Party supporters to vote for Liberal Democrats in constituencies where they had an incumbent MP or a strong chance of winning.

In August 2021, Tatchell endorsed Tamsin Omond and Amelia Womack in the 2021 Green Party of England and Wales leadership election.

=== Iraq War ===
Tatchell opposed the 2003 invasion of Iraq, and the subsequent occupation of Iraqi territory by Coalition forces. For nearly three decades, he had supported the Iraqi Left Opposition, an organization opposed to the government of Saddam Hussein due to human rights violations that Hussein had committed against democrats, left-wingers, trade unionists, Shia Muslims and the Kurdish people, and because under Saddam's dictatorship there were no opportunities for peaceful, democratic change. He advocated military and financial aid to opponents of the Saddam government, suggesting that anti-Saddam organisations be given "tanks, helicopter gun-ships, fighter planes, heavy artillery and anti-tank and anti-aircraft missiles". While opposing western intervention, he advocated regime change from within in countries such as Saudi Arabia, Iran and Syria. Tatchell has written that on 12 March 2003 he ambushed Tony Blair's motorcade in an anti-Iraq war protest. He forced Blair's limousine to stop, and then unfolded a banner that read "Arm the Kurds! Topple Saddam". He added that in terms of the political struggle within Britain (as opposed to struggles against absolute tyrants like Hitler and Saddam, where violent resistance can be the lesser of two evils): "I remain committed to the Gandhian principle of non-violence". After the war he signed the 'Unite Against Terror' declaration, arguing that "the pseudo-left reveals its shameless hypocrisy and its wholesale abandonment of humanitarian values" by supporting resistance and insurgent groups in Iraq that resort to indiscriminate terrorism, killing innocent civilians.

In 2003, Tatchell said he supported giving "massive material aid" to Iraqi opposition groups, including the "Shi'ite Supreme Council for Islamic Revolution in Iraq" (SCIRI), to bring down Saddam. But in 2006 Tatchell noted that SCIRI had become markedly more fundamentalist and was endorsing violent attacks on anyone who did not conform to its increasingly harsh interpretation of Islam. He claimed that SCIRI, the leading force in Baghdad's ruling coalition, wanted to establish an Iranian-style religious dictatorship, with a goal of clerical fascism, and had engaged in "terrorisation of gay Iraqis", as well as terrorising Sunni Muslims, left-wingers, unveiled women and people who listen to western pop music or wear jeans or shorts.

In September 2014, Tatchell advocated arming the Kurdistan Workers' Party to fight against ISIS, and argued that the US and EU had been wrong to designate it as a terrorist organisation.

=== Syrian civil war ===
A previous supporter of the Stop the War Coalition, Tatchell and many other public personalities expressed concern with the coalition's allegedly unduly favourable view of Bashar al-Assad's government in Syria, and has called for the Labour leader and former Stop the War Chair Jeremy Corbyn not to attend the Coalition's Christmas fundraiser 2015. In December 2016, Tatchell and others disrupted Corbyn's speech on human rights on the basis that the Labour leader had responded insufficiently to the bombing of Aleppo and urged him to condemn Russian military intervention in Syria.

== Campaigning ==
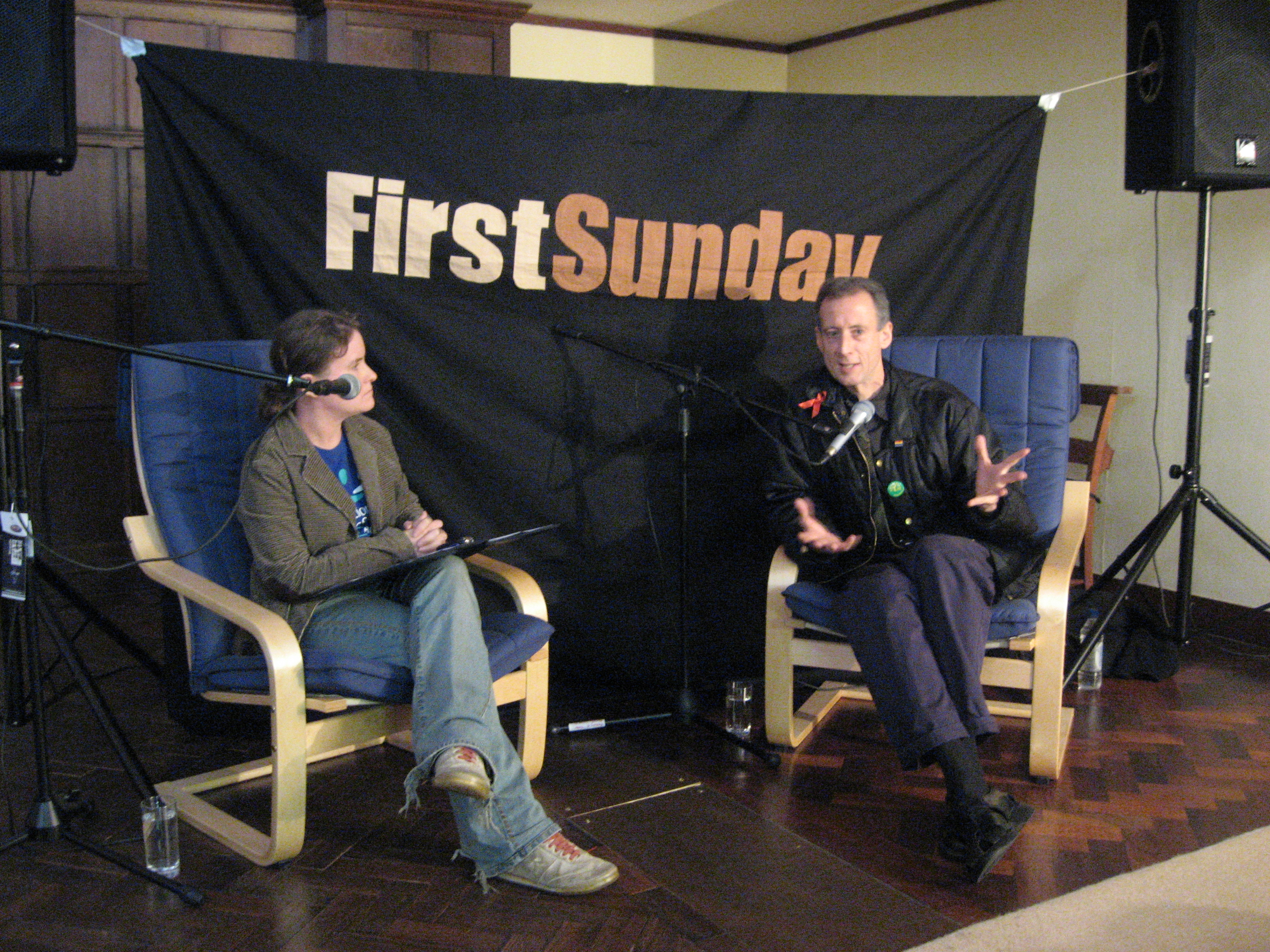
Tatchell being interviewed by Natalie Thorne, deputy editor of Fyne Times, at a 'First Sunday' event, November 2007

Peter Tatchell has campaigned for many civil rights issues, including protests against repression, racism, homophobia, censorship and the death penalty. As a result of his protests and campaigning, Tatchell has been attacked more than 300 times, has had a live bullet through his door and has survived two stabbing attempts (all as of 2009). He was beaten unconscious by Robert Mugabe's bodyguards in Brussels and far-right protestors in Moscow left him with permanently blurred vision in his right eye. He suffers memory loss, concentration issues and problems with balance and coordination as a result.

=== OutRage! ===
Tatchell took part in many gay rights campaigns over issues such as Section 28. Following the murder of actor Michael Boothe on 10 May 1990, Tatchell was one of thirty people to attend the inaugural meeting of the radical gay rights non-violent direct action group OutRage!—and although he did not convene this first meeting, he drafted its first Statement of Aims, and has remained a leading member. The group fuses theatrical performance styles with queer protest. As the most prominent OutRage! member, Tatchell is sometimes assumed to be the leader of the group, though he has never claimed this, saying he is one among equals.

In 1991, a small group of OutRage! members covertly formed a separate group to engage in a campaign of outing public figures who were homophobic in public but gay in private. The group took the name FROCS (Faggots Rooting Out Closeted Sexuality). Tatchell was the group's go-between with the press, forwarding their news statements to his media contacts. Considerable publicity and public debate followed FROCS's threat to out 200 leading public personalities from the world of politics, religion, business and sport. With Tatchell's assistance, members of FROCS eventually called a press conference to tell the world that their campaign was a hoax intended to demonstrate the hypocrisy of those newspapers that had condemned the campaign despite having themselves outed celebrities and politicians.

Some OutRage! activities were highly controversial. In 1994, it unveiled placards inviting ten Church of England bishops to "tell the truth" about what Outrage! alleged was their homosexuality and accusing them of condemning homosexuality in public while leading secret gay lives. Shortly afterwards, the group wrote to twenty UK MPs, condemning their alleged support for anti-gay laws and claiming they would out them if the MPs did not stop what they described as attacks on the gay community. The MP Sir James Kilfedder, an opponent of gay equality who received one of the letters, died two months later of a sudden heart attack—on the day one of the Belfast newspapers planned to out him. In a comment in The Independent in October 2003, Tatchell claimed the OutRage! action against the bishops was his greatest mistake because he failed to anticipate that the media and the church would treat it as an invasion of privacy.

On 12 April 1998, Tatchell led an OutRage! protest which disrupted the Easter sermon by George Carey, the Archbishop of Canterbury, with Tatchell mounting the pulpit to denounce what he said was Carey's opposition to legal equality for lesbian and gay people. The protest garnered media coverage and led to Tatchell's prosecution under the little-used Ecclesiastical Courts Jurisdiction Act 1860 (formerly part of the Brawling Act 1551), which prohibits any form of disruption or protest in a church. Tatchell failed in his attempt to summon Carey as a witness and was convicted. The judge fined him the trivial sum of £18.60, which commentators theorised was a wry allusion to the year of the statute used to convict him.

The LGBT press dubbed him "Saint Peter Tatchell" following further OutRage! campaigns involving religion.

A number of African LGBTI leaders signed a statement condemning the involvement of Tatchell and OutRage! in African issues, which led Tatchell to respond that he favoured working with the radical LGBTI groups in Africa rather than the more conservative (according to him) leaders who had signed the statement. Tatchell and OutRage! published a refutation of the allegations.

OutRage!'s protest against Chief Rabbi Immanuel Jakobovits, who supported the idea of genetic engineering to eliminate homosexuality, led to accusations that Tatchell was antisemitic, following OutRage!'s leaflets citing the similarity of Jakobovits ideas for the eradication of homosexuality to those of Heinrich Himmler were distributed outside the Western and Marble Arch Synagogue on Rosh Hashanah in September 1993.

Rabbi Dame Julia Neuberger, who had campaigned for gay rights, said, "Drawing a comparison between Lord Jakobovits and Himmler is offensive, racist and [...] makes OutRage appear antisemitic". She stated that the action and leaflet would "alienate Jews who are sympathetic to gay rights".

==== Stop Murder Music campaign ====
Tatchell has said that a number of Afro-Caribbean artists produce music that glorifies murder of homosexual men, and incites violence against homosexuals. He argued that British laws against incitement to violence were not being enforced on foreign artists performing in the UK. He also organised protests outside the concerts of singers, mainly Jamaican dancehall and ragga artists, who he says glorify violence toward lesbians and gay men, including murder. Tatchell's campaign began in 1992 when Buju Banton's song "Boom bye-bye" was released. He has picketed the MOBO Awards ceremony to protest at their inviting performers of what he terms "murder music".

Tatchell argues that murder is not legal in Jamaica, and glorification of murder is not a legitimate form of Afro-Caribbean culture. In response, Tatchell received death threats and was labelled racist. He defended himself by noting that the campaign was at the behest of the Jamaican gay rights group J-Flag, and the UK-based Black Gay Men's Advisory Group, with which he works closely. He pointed to what he described as his life's work campaigning against racism and apartheid, and stated that his campaigns against "murder music" and state-sanctioned homophobic violence in Jamaica were endorsed by many black gay rights activists and by many straight human rights activists in Jamaica (male homosexuality remains illegal in Jamaica). The campaign has had positive effects, with seven of eight original murder music singers signing the Reggae Compassion Act, which says that signatories will not "make statements or perform songs" that incite hatred or violence.

Members of the Rastafari movement accused Tatchell of racism and extremism, saying, "He has gone over way over the top. It's simply racist to put Hitler and Sizzla in the same bracket and just shows how far he is prepared to go." Tatchell denies equating Sizzla with Hitler.

=== UK campaigning ===
==== LGBT equality legislation ====
In 2006, Peter Tatchell opposed the appointment of Ruth Kelly as Secretary of State for Communities and Local Government as Kelly had not supported equal treatment of lesbians and gay men in any parliamentary votes. Tatchell said "her appointment suggests the government does not take lesbian and gay rights seriously", adding "Tony Blair would never appoint someone to a race-equality post who had a lukewarm record of opposing racism".

===== Age of consent legislation =====
In 1996, Tatchell led an OutRage! campaign to reduce the age of consent in the UK to 14 years (as per Romeo and Juliet laws), to adjust for studies that showed nearly half of all young people had their first sexual experiences prior to 16 years old, regardless of sexuality. He stated that he wished to exempt these people from being "treated as criminals by the law", and that there should be no prosecution if the difference in ages of the sexual partners was no more than three years, provided that these youths were consenting and were given a more comprehensive sex education at a younger date. On 10 March 2008, in the Irish Independent, he repeated his call for a lower age of consent to end the criminalisation of young people engaged in consenting sex and to remove the legal obstacles to upfront sex education, condom provision and safer sex advice.

In 1997, Tatchell wrote a letter to The Guardian defending an academic book about "boy-love" against what he has said was "censorship". In the letter, Tatchell said "Whilst it may be impossible to condone paedophilia, it is time society acknowledged the truth that not all sex involving children is unwanted, abusive and harmful", citing examples of "Papuan tribes and some of my friends" who did not feel harmed by these experiences. Tatchell later said that the letter was edited, and that he "was not endorsing their viewpoint but merely stating that they had a different perspective from the mainstream opinion". (Note: Tatchell: "My Guardian letter cited examples of youths in Papuan tribes and some of my friends who, when they were under 16, had sex with adults (over 18s), but who do not feel they were harmed. I was not endorsing their viewpoint but merely stating that they had a different perspective from the mainstream opinion about inter-generational sex. They have every right for their perspective to be heard.") Tatchell has, on several occasions, since reiterated that he does not condone adults having sex with children and that his "articles urging an age of consent of 14 are motivated solely by a desire to reduce the criminalisation of under-16s who have consenting relationships with other young people of similar ages". (Note: Tatchell has said: "My articles urging an age of consent of 14 are motivated solely by a desire to reduce the criminalisation of under-16s who have consenting relationships with other young people of similar ages. I do not support adults having sex with children. I do not advocate teenagers having sex before the age of 16. But if they do have sex before their 16th birthday, they should not be arrested, given a criminal record and put on the sex offenders register." "I condemn without reservation child sex abuse, the rape of children and adults having sex with kids. It is abhorrent, totally wrong and unacceptable. The perpetrators should be jailed. I have never condoned paedophilia. There are no circumstances where it is acceptable for adults to have sex with children." "I reiterate my view that sexual relations with children are despicable and always wrong, even if other people document societies where these relationships are acceptable and deemed positive. They are profoundly mistaken and are colluding with child sex abuse." In 2012, he pointed to an interview he conducted in the late 1990s on the subject of paedophilia and child prostitution, in which he interviewed a 14-year-old boy (under the pseudonym "Lee") who had had sex with older men, in some cases for money. In this interview, Tatchell makes various counterarguments against Lee's point of view, asking whether he has the capacity to consent and discussing the risks of harm.) Following the publication of a photo of Tatchell alongside the Irish Minister for Children, Equality, Disability, Integration and Youth, Roderic O'Gorman, on Twitter, at a Pride event, O'Gorman issued a statement outlining that the apparent views in Tatchell's letter—written 23 years ago, when O'Gorman was 15—were "abhorrent" to him, and that he appreciated that Tatchell had since clarified his own position.

In 2011, Tatchell wrote an obituary in The Independent for Scottish gay rights activist Ian Dunn. Tatchell later said that he had not known about Dunn's connections with the Paedophile Information Exchange until "many years after", and denounced PIE as "disgusting". In July 2021, Hayley Dixon, Melanie Newman and Julie Bindel said in the Daily Telegraph that a positive review of the pro-paedophilia book Betrayal of Youth, attributed to Peter Tatchell, had appeared in the June 1987 edition of the Communist Party of Great Britain newsletter. The review reportedly stated that "consenting, victimless sexual relationships between younger and older people should not be penalised by the law". Tatchell said he hadn't read the book at the time and that a colleague wrote the review for him. He apologised for the review and said it did not reflect his views. Tatchell had also contributed a chapter to the same book, which he later said he had been "conned" into submitting.

====== Anti-pornography laws ======
In 1998 and 2008, he supported relaxation of the then strict laws against pornography, arguing that pornography can have some social benefits, and he has criticised what he calls the body-shaming phobia against nudism, suggesting that nudity may be natural and healthy for society.

===== Civil partnerships =====
Tatchell has pledged his support for opposite-sex couples to be allowed to have civil partnerships, stating that some opposite-sex couples dislike the "sexist, homophobic history of [the institution of] marriage", and allowing them into civil partnerships "is simply a matter of equality".

Writing for PinkNews, he said:

David Cameron has betrayed the principle of equality by refusing to allow opposite-sex couples to have a civil partnership. His government is maintaining legal discrimination against straight partners. ... Not everyone wants to get married, given that marriage has a long sexist and homophobic history. ... Some LGBT and straight people don't like the sexist, homophobic traditions of marriage. They'd prefer a civil partnership; believing it to be more equal and without the historical baggage that goes with matrimony. They should have the choice of a civil partnership if they wish. Marriage should not be the only option. Couples should not be forced to marry to get legal recognition and rights. They should have the alternative option of a civil partnership.

In June 2018, the Supreme Court ruled that the ban on opposite-sex civil partnerships was in violation of the European Convention of Human Rights. The government, headed by Theresa May, announced it would change the law in October 2018. On 2 December 2019, the law came into effect in England and Wales, although the law was not extended to Northern Ireland until 13 January 2020. The Scottish Parliament enacted its own law to the same effect on 1 June 2021.

==== No-platforming views ====
On 14 February 2015, Tatchell was one of a number of signatories to a letter criticising the trend in the National Union of Students to apply a No Platform policy to activists who criticised the sex industry or expressed gender-critical views. In particular, the letter cited the denial of a platform to Kate Smurthwaite at Goldsmiths College and to Germaine Greer at the University of Cambridge. This resulted in the National Union of Students' LGBT representative, Fran Cowling, refusing to appear alongside Tatchell at a discussion on "re-radicalising queers" at Canterbury Christ Church University. Cowling cited what she saw as the letter's endorsement of openly transphobic campaigners. Tatchell has said that although he "totally disagreed" with anti-trans activists, he supported their right to free speech and felt it was better to debate them than silence them.

He emphasised that Cowling had never consulted the NUS membership before deciding to make pronouncements on their behalf, and said, "This sorry, sad saga is symptomatic of the decline of free and open debate on some university campuses. There is a witch-hunting, accusatory atmosphere. Allegations are made without evidence to back them—or worse, they are made citing false, trumped-up evidence."

Tatchell received death threats after signing the letter. He later stated that he would have worded the letter differently to clarify that he supported the human rights of trans people and sex workers, but that he had signed the letter nonetheless because he believed in the message of free speech on campuses. He said that the initial draft that he signed contained the sentence "Some of us have disagreements with the views expressed" by gender-critical activists, and that he was "not happy" that this was cut out of the final letter.

=== International campaigning ===
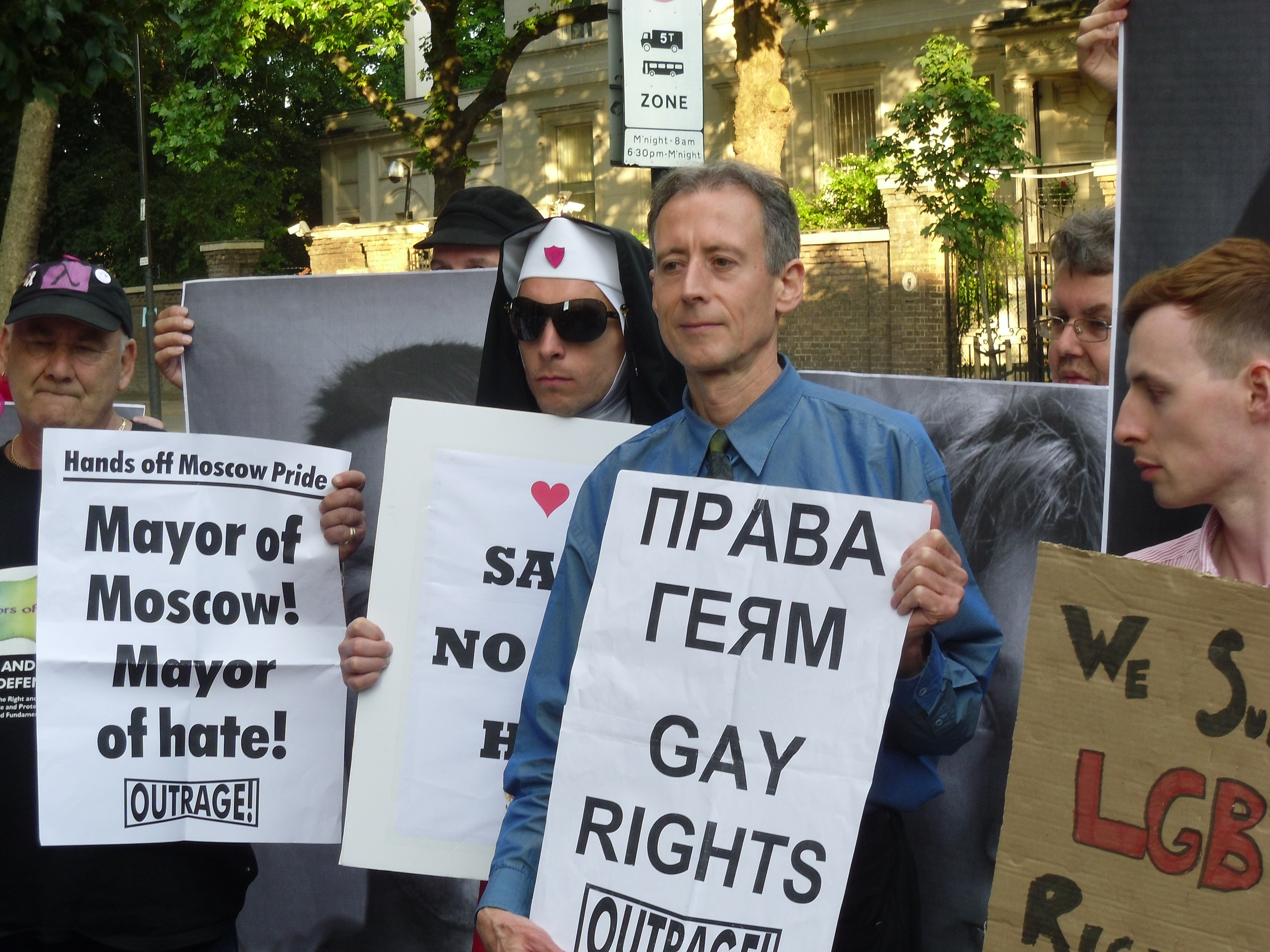
Tatchell protests the prohibition of Moscow Pride, 2011

==== Australia ====
While still at school, Tatchell campaigned in favour of better treatment of, and full human rights for, Aboriginal Australians. He has said that Australian cities should be renamed with their original Aboriginal place names. For example, the Tasmanian capital Hobart would be renamed Nipaluna. Tatchell said this would be a fitting tribute to Australia's Aboriginal heritage, which he said has been discarded and disrespected for too long.

==== Balochistan ====
Since 2006, he expressed concern for the Baloch people facing military operations in their homeland, Balochistan in Pakistan. From 2007 to 2009, he campaigned in defence of two UK-based Baloch Muslim human rights activists, Hyrbyair Marri and Faiz Baluch, accused of terrorism and tried in London. Both men were acquitted in 2009. He alleged collusion by the British and U.S. governments in regards to the suppression of the Balochs, including arms sales to Pakistan, which he says were used to bomb and attack Baloch towns and villages.

==== Gaza and the West Bank ====
In May 2004, he and a dozen other lesbians and gay men from OutRage! and the Queer Youth Network joined a London demonstration organised by the Palestine Solidarity Campaign. Their placards read: "Israel: stop persecuting Palestine! Palestine: stop persecuting queers!" Tatchell says that others present accused him of being a Mossad agent sent to disrupt the march, of being a racist or a Zionist, of being a supporter of Ariel Sharon, and of being an agent of the Central Intelligence Agency or MI5. Tatchell has written a number of articles in The Guardian on the issue.

==== Iran ====
Tatchell is a critic of Iran's criminal code, which has parts based on sharia and which prescribes punishments for zina offenses, including consensual sexual relations between same-sex partners.

In 2005, Iran executed two teenagers, Mahmoud Asgari and Ayaz Marhoni, aged 16 and 18, who were accused of raping a 13-year-old boy at knifepoint. Tatchell said that Iran has a history of arresting political activists on false charges and extracting false confessions from death penalty convicts, and declared that he believed the original crime was consensual sex between the two, which is illegal in Iran.

Tatchell reiterated his long-standing view that Iran is an "Islamo-fascist state". He said that information from Iranian exile groups with contacts inside Iran was that the teenagers were at a secret gay party before they were arrested. International human rights groups Amnesty International and Human Rights Watch preferred campaigners to focus on Iran violating the Convention on the Rights of the Child (which forbids the execution of juveniles) rather than the allegation of consensual sex.

==== Israel ====
In 2006, Israel's hosting of WorldPride in Jerusalem was criticised by Israeli religious groups. The event was welcomed by LGBT groups such as Jerusalem Open House (JOH), a local advocacy organisation which supports the rights of both Israeli and Palestinian LGBT people, and by OutRage! in the UK. Tatchell issued a statement on behalf of the latter, in which he said that OutRage! opposed a boycott of WorldPride Jerusalem because holding the event would be a "huge defeat for the Christian, Judaist and Muslim fundamentalists who want it banned and who believe lesbian and gay people should be jailed, flogged or executed".

In a 2009 article for The Guardian, Tatchell condemned what he described as "disproportionate" and "reckless" attacks by the Israeli military on Gaza, but also argued that Western liberals and progressives should not support Hamas which he described as an Islamist group that represses Palestinians.

In 2011, he opposed the International LGBTQI Youth and Student Organisation's (IGLYO) plan to hold its general assembly in Tel Aviv that December. While noting the progressive attitude to LGBT people in the country, he said the decision was "divisive, exclusionist, mistaken and regrettable", and could "inflame homophobia" in the region by giving Arab states the view that LGBT people supported the Israeli government. He urged the IGLYO and the Israeli Gay Youth movement to protest the occupation of Palestine just as LGBT activists had protested against South African apartheid previously.

==== Mozambique and Guinea-Bissau ====
Upon moving to London in 1971, Tatchell was active in solidarity work with the independence movements in Mozambique, and Guinea-Bissau.

==== People's Republic of China ====
In April 2008, Tatchell attempted to disrupt the procession of the Olympic torch though London. As a protest against China's human rights record, he stood in front of the bus carrying the torch along Oxford Street while carrying a placard calling on Beijing to "Free Tibet, Free Hu Jia" (the name of a recently jailed human rights activist). Tatchell was taken away by police but was not charged. In an interview Tatchell called on the world to boycott the opening ceremony of the Olympics, or to take other visible action.

==== Russia ====
Tatchell has written articles condemning the Russian anti-LGBT propaganda law. In 2014, Tatchell protested Valery Gergiev's support for Vladimir Putin.

Tatchell protested the 2014 Winter Olympics in Sochi over the gay rights stance of Russia, comparing the event to the 1936 Olympics in Berlin. Tatchell was arrested at the Moscow Pride parade in 2011 amid a spate of anti-LGBT violence by neo-Nazis.

===== Mayor of Moscow =====
In February 2007, the Mayor of Moscow, Yury Luzhkov, visited London mayor Ken Livingstone for an annual meeting that also involved the Mayors of Berlin and Paris, with the mayor of Beijing present as well. Nikolay Alexeyev, one of the organizers of the Moscow gay pride parade, joined Tatchell in protesting the visit. A notice of the protest quoted Talgat Tadzhuddin saying that the Moscow pride marchers should be flogged.

Livingstone asserted that he supported LGBT rights, and said, "In Moscow the Russian Orthodox church, the chief rabbi and the grand Mufti all supported the ban on the Gay Pride march with the main role, due to its great weight in society, being played by the Orthodox church. The attempt of Mr Tatchell to focus attention on the role of the grand Mufti in Moscow, in the face of numerous attacks on gay rights in Eastern Europe, which overwhelmingly come from right-wing Christian and secular currents, is a clear example of an Islamophobic campaign."

In response, Tatchell said that Livingstone's remarks were "dishonest, despicable nonsense", adding, "The Grand Mufti was not singled out". He further said the Mayor had brought his "office into disrepute" and "has revealed himself to be a person without principles, honesty or integrity."

===== Moscow Pride =====
In May 2006, Tatchell attended the first Moscow Pride Festival. He appears in the documentary Moscow Pride '06 featuring this event.

In May 2007, Tatchell returned to Moscow to support Moscow Pride and to voice his opposition to a ban on the march, staying at the flat of an American diplomat. On 27 May 2007, Tatchell and other gay rights activists were attacked. He was punched in the face and nearly knocked unconscious, while other demonstrators were beaten, kicked and assaulted. A German MP, Volker Beck, and a European Parliament deputy from Italy, Marco Cappato, were also punched before being arrested and questioned by police. Tatchell later said "I'm not deterred one iota from coming back to protest in Moscow." On his release, Tatchell made a report on the incident to the American Embassy.

===== Moscow protest against Yuri Luzkhov =====
On 16 May 2009, the day of the final of the Eurovision Song Contest in Moscow, Russian gay rights activists staged a protest in Moscow in defiance of the city's mayor, Yuri Luzkhov, who had long banned gay demonstrations and denounced them as "satanic". Tatchell was among 32 campaigners arrested, including Belarusian gay activist Sergey Androsenko, when they shouted slogans and unfurled banners.

==== South Africa ====
Tatchell first became involved in anti-apartheid activism as a teenager in the late 1960s. In an essay for the book Sex and Politics in South Africa, he describes how his lobbying of the ANC and Thabo Mbeki in 1987 contributed to it renouncing homophobia and making its first public commitment to gay and lesbian human rights. In 1989 and 1990, he and others helped persuade the ANC to include a ban on anti-gay discrimination in the post-apartheid constitution. He assisted in drafting model clauses for what became Section Nine.

In January 2005, after Tatchell was named as one of the UK's three most "hate filled bigots" in the Desi Xpress newspaper, Aaron Saeed, Muslim Affairs spokesperson for the gay human rights group OutRage!, pointed out that Tatchell had, by that point, been involved in the anti-apartheid movement for over 20 years and had campaigned against racism for 35 years.

==== Vietnam and Cambodia ====
Tatchell participated in the mass Vietnam Moratorium protests in Melbourne in 1970. The same year, Tatchell founded and was elected secretary of the inter-denominational anti-war movement, Christians for Peace.

In 2002, he brought an unsuccessful legal action in Bow Street Magistrate's Court for the arrest of the former U.S. Secretary of State, Henry Kissinger, on charges of war crimes in Vietnam and Cambodia.

==== Zimbabwe ====
Part of Tatchell's political activism and journalism in the 1970s involved the Rhodesian Bush War, in which he supported the black nationalist movement, including the Zimbabwe African National Union and its military wing. He even sent medical kits to the black nationalists, who were otherwise unable to get the right to vote or other equal rights from the white government at the time. But he became disenchanted with Robert Mugabe's regime and by the 1990s, Zimbabwean activists had contacted him for support in highlighting Mugabe's increasing human rights abuses. After Mugabe denounced male homosexuality in 1995, Tatchell helped organise a high-profile protest for LGBT rights in Zimbabwe outside the Zimbabwe High Commission in London.

Two years later, he passed through police security disguised as a TV cameraman to quiz Mugabe during the "Africa at 40" conference at Methodist Central Hall, Westminster. Mugabe told him that allegations of human rights abuses were grossly exaggerated; he reportedly spat out his tea when Tatchell told him that he was gay. Mugabe's minders then summoned Special Branch guards, who ejected Tatchell. On 26 October 1997, a letter from Tatchell to The Observer argued that the United Kingdom should suspend aid to Zimbabwe because of its violence against LGBT people.

Tatchell researched the Gukurahundi attacks in Matabeleland in the 1980s, when the Zimbabwean Fifth Brigade attacked supporters of the Zimbabwe African Peoples Union. He said that Mugabe had broken international human rights law during the attack, which is estimated to have involved the massacre of around 20,000 civilians. Then in 1999, journalists Mark Chavunduka and Ray Choto were tortured by the Zimbabwe Army.

Tatchell said that the arrest of Augusto Pinochet in London had set a precedent that human rights violations could be pursued against a head of state, thanks to the principle of universal jurisdiction. On 30 October 1999, Tatchell and three other OutRage! activists approached Mugabe's car in a London street and attempted to perform a citizen's arrest. Tatchell opened the car door and apprehended Mugabe; he then called the police. The four OutRage! activists were arrested, on charges including criminal damage, assault and breach of the peace; charges were dropped on the opening day of their trial. Mugabe responded by describing Tatchell and his OutRage! colleagues as "gay gangsters"—a slogan frequently repeated by his supporters—and claimed they had been sent by the United Kingdom government.

On 5 March 2001, when Mugabe visited Brussels, Tatchell again attempted a citizen's arrest. Mugabe's bodyguards were seen knocking him to the floor. Later that day, Tatchell was briefly knocked unconscious by Mugabe's bodyguards and was left with permanent damage to his right eye. The protest drew worldwide headlines, as Mugabe was highly unpopular in the Western world for his land redistribution policy. Tatchell's actions were praised by Zimbabwean activists and many of the newspapers that had previously denounced him. Police, however, warned Tatchell that he could be the victim of an assassination attempt.

Tatchell ultimately failed in his attempt to secure an international arrest warrant against Mugabe on torture charges. The magistrate argued that Mugabe had immunity from prosecution as a serving head of state.

In late 2003, Tatchell acted as a press spokesman for the launch of the Zimbabwe Freedom Movement (ZFM), which claimed to be a clandestine group within Zimbabwe committed to overthrowing the Mugabe government by force. The civic action support group Sokwanele urged Tatchell to check his sources, speculating that the group might have been set up by the Zimbabwe government to justify violent action. This speculation proved to be unfounded; the Mugabe regime initially dismissed the ZFM as a hoax before claiming it was an effort orchestrated by the opposition Movement for Democratic Change (MDC) party. However, two Central Intelligence Organization members were spotted and turned away from the ZFM launch, as shown in the film Peter Tatchell: Just who does he think he is? by Max Barber.

=== Social issues ===
==== Animal rights ====
Tatchell is an active supporter of animal rights, saying "human rights and animal rights are two aspects of the same struggle against injustice", and that he advocates for a "claim to be spared suffering and offered inalienable rights" for both humans and animals.

==== Cornwall ====
Tatchell campaigned on the issue of the constitutional status of Cornwall. In November 2008, The Guardian carried an article by him entitled "Self-rule for Cornwall," in which he said:

Like Wales and Scotland, Cornwall considers itself a separate Celtic nation—so why shouldn't it have independence? [...] [Cornish] Nationalists argue that Cornwall is a subjugated nation, in much the same way that Scotland and Wales once were. Not only is the historic Cornish flag—a white cross on a black background—excluded from the Union Jack; until not so long ago Cornish people needed planning permission to fly it. Comparisons with Scotland and Wales are valid. After all, Cornwall has all the basic cultural attributes of a nation: its own distinct Celtic language, history, festivals, cuisine, music, dance and sports. Many Cornish people perceive themselves to be other than English. Despite the government's resistance, under [the] Commission for Racial Equality and Council of Europe guidelines, they qualify for recognition as a national minority. [...] Cornwall was once separate and self-governing. If the Cornish people want autonomy and it would improve their lives, why shouldn't they have self-rule once again? Malta, with only 400,000 people, is an independent state within the EU. Why not Cornwall?

This article received the largest number of comments to any Guardian article, according to This Is Cornwall. Over 1,500 comments were made, and while some comments were supportive, Tatchell found himself "shocked and disgusted" by the anti-Cornish sentiment shown by many commenters.

==== Environmental issues ====
For over 20 years, Tatchell has written and campaigned about environmental problems including global warming and resource depletion, pointing out that they often have a disproportionately negative impact on developing countries. In the late 1980s, he was co-organiser of the Green and Socialist Conferences, which sought to ally reds and greens. He championed energy conservation and renewable energy; in particular tidal, wave and concentrated solar power. On 24 May 2009, he appeared on the BBC Daily Politics programme to oppose the Elephant and Castle regeneration scheme, which he said would bring few benefits to local working-class people. However, most of his campaigning continues to be in the areas of human rights and "queer emancipation".

In August 2008 Tatchell wrote about speculative theories concerning possible atmospheric oxygen depletion compared to prehistoric levels, and called for further investigation to test such claims and, if proven, their long-term consequences.

==== Free speech ====
In 2006, during the Jyllands-Posten Muhammad cartoons controversy, Tatchell spoke at a 25 March 2006 rally called the Freedom of Expression Rally.

In 2007, he wrote an opinion piece in The Guardian saying, "The best way to tackle prejudice is by presenting facts and using reasoned arguments, to break down ignorance and ill-will." In 2016, Tatchell chose threats to free speech in Britain as the topic of his British Humanist Association annual conference lecture. Speaking with reference to a number of censorship controversies in the 2010s, he said that "the recent trend against freedom of speech means that we must fight the battles of the Enlightenment all over again."

In 2018, Tatchell voiced his support for Mark Meechan's conviction under section 127 of the Communications Act 2003 for posting a "grossly offensive" video on YouTube.

==== Multiculturalism and cultural relativism ====
Tatchell has said he is committed to "multiculturalism and the right to be different". In a 2009 lecture at the Gallery of Modern Art, Glasgow, Tatchell said:

A good, beneficial multicultural society is one in which everyone has the freedom to pursue their own different ethics and lifestyles, while in the public sphere all citizens are treated as equals and are bound together by a shared commitment to universal human rights, regardless of the differences in their personal morality and private lives. I do not, for example, insist that people of faith approve of homosexuality, but I do expect them to not discriminate on the grounds of sexual orientation.

Tatchell said that moral and cultural relativism should not be used as an excuse for "collusion with the violation of human rights when it comes to issues like women’s rights and incitements to homophobic violence". He also said multiculturalism shouldn't be used to institutionalise discrimination, giving as an example the state funding of religious schools, which he said "factionalises pupils along religious lines". He said that fear of being branded racist or religiously intolerant should not allow dictators and human rights abusers to avoid criticism for their actions.

==== Religion ====
===== Anglican and Catholic churches =====
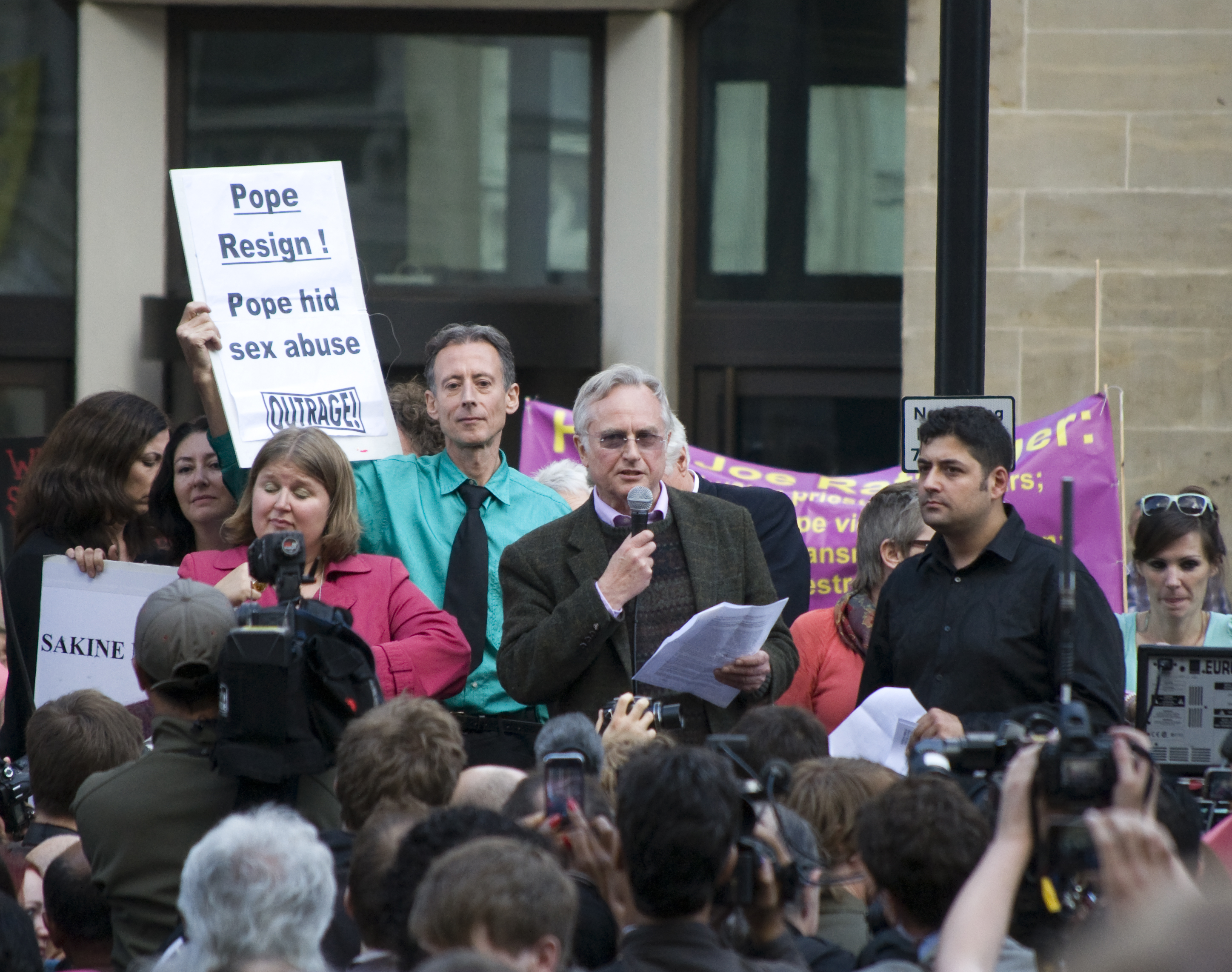
Tatchell behind Richard Dawkins, protesting Pope Benedict XVI's visit to the United Kingdom

Tatchell criticised the Catholic Church and Pope Benedict XVI, whom he described as "the ideological inheritor of Nazi homophobia". Tatchell said of the Pope, "He'd like to eradicate homosexuality, but since he can't put LGBT people in physical concentration camps, is doing his best to put them in psychological concentration camps."

Channel 4 indicated in June 2010 that Tatchell would be the presenter of a documentary film examining "the current Pope's teachings throughout the world". The plans sparked criticism from some prominent British Catholics including Conservative politician Ann Widdecombe, who accused Channel 4 of trying to "stir up controversy". Tatchell asserted that the documentary "will not be an anti-Catholic programme".

On 15 September 2010, Tatchell, along with 54 other public figures, signed an open letter, published in The Guardian, stating their opposition to Pope Benedict XVI's visit to the United Kingdom.

With respect to Anglicanism, he stated that "it's very sad to see a good man like the Archbishop of Canterbury, Rowan Williams, going to such extraordinary lengths to appease homophobes within the Anglican Communion".

In 2017, Tatchell praised the Church of England's new "Valuing all God's Children" scheme for schools, which seeks to stop homophobic and transphobic bullying.

===== Islam =====
Tatchell has been critical of Islamic extremism and the use of religion to justify discrimination, though he has also said he supports the rights of Muslims and freedom of expression. In 1995, in an article about the risk to LGBT rights from Islamic fundamentalism in Britain, Tatchell wrote that "although not all Muslims are anti-gay, significant numbers are violently homophobic [...] homophobic Muslim voters may be able to influence the outcome of elections in 20 or more marginal constituencies."

Tatchell has also been critical of the All-Party Parliamentary Group on British Muslims' definition of Islamophobia, which he said is "well-intended but worrisome". He said he prefers the term "anti-Muslim hatred", since it "focuses on the prejudice against Muslim people that undermines their well-being and life chances" rather than on defending Islam as an ideology. He said that the APPG's definition, based on Muslimness, is a vague and subjective term, that it could be used to persecute Muslims themselves, and that it could become "a de facto threat to free speech and liberal values". He said the definition also didn't account for religious sectarianism from Christians and Jews.

Tatchell has described Sharia, the traditional Islamic religious law, as "a clerical form of fascism". He was the keynote speaker at a 2005 protest at the Canadian High Commission, opposing proposals to extend Ontario's arbitration law to cover Sharia. Tatchell said, "It is wrong in principle to create a separate, segregated legal system for Muslims."

In 2017, Tatchell wrote to the organisers of Pride in London to defend the Council of Ex-Muslims of Britain. In response to calls by the East London Mosque for CEMB to apologise for placards alleging the mosque "incites murder of LGBTs", Tatchell stated "East London Mosque has refused all dialogue with LGBT community. It refuses to meet LGBT Muslims. I have asked them 11 times since 2015".

Tatchell has previously condemned Islamophobia, saying "any form of prejudice, hatred, discrimination or violence against Muslims is wrong. Full stop". He described the Qur'an as "rather mild in its condemnation of homosexuality".

He points out that much of his prison and asylum casework involves supporting Muslim prisoners and asylum seekers—heterosexual as well as LGBT. In 2006, he helped stop the abuse of Muslim prisoners at a Norwich jail and helped secure parole for other Muslim detainees. Half his asylum cases are, he reports, male and female Muslim refugees. Two of his highest-profile campaigns involved Muslim victims—Mohamed S, who was framed by men who first tried to kill him and then jailed him for eight years, and Sid Saeed, who brought a racism and homophobic harassment case against Deutsche Bank.

In February 2010, Women Against Fundamentalism defended Tatchell against allegations of Islamophobia and endorsed his right to challenge all religious fundamentalism: "WAF supports the right of Peter Tatchell and numerous other gay activists to oppose the legitimisation of fundamentalists and other right wing forces on university campuses, by the Left and by the government in its Preventing Violent Extremism strategy and numerous other programmes and platforms".

====== Muslim Council of Britain ======
Tatchell had described the Muslim Council of Britain as being "anti-gay", asking how can "they expect to win respect for their community, if at the same time as demanding action against Islamophobia, they themselves demand the legal enforcement of homophobia?". He noted that the MCB had joined forces with the "rightwing Christian Institute" to oppose every gay law reform from 1997 to 2006. In January 2006, the MCB Chairman Iqbal Sacranie said that homosexuals are immoral, harmful and diseased on BBC Radio 4.

Tatchell argued that "Both the Muslim and gay communities suffer prejudice and discrimination. We should stand together to fight Islamophobia and homophobia". Tatchell subsequently criticised Unite Against Fascism for inviting Sacranie to share its platforms, describing him as a "homophobic hate-mongerer."

When the MCB boycotted Holocaust Memorial Day, partly because it was "not sufficiently inclusive", Tatchell wrote that "the only thing that is consistent about the MCB is its opposition to the human rights of lesbians and gay men".

====== Islam and LGBT rights ======
In 2006, Tatchell wrote an opinion column in The Guardian arguing that Muslims deliberately conflate offence with violence, in an effort to suppress Muslim reformers in Britain. He argued that Islamist groups like Hizb ut-Tahrir in Britain see "any criticism of Islam is an insult and that all such insults are unacceptable" in order to suppress the "free exchange of ideas". The Muslim gay rights organisation IMAAN criticised Tatchell, saying, "OutRage! doesn't understand our cultural and religious sensitivities. Often, the way they word and phrase their press releases can and does antagonise Muslims. Much as we’ve invited them to meetings so we can talk about the best way to tackle Muslim LGBT issues, they insist on doing things their way."

In the book "Out of Place: Interrogating Silences in Queerness/Raciality", in a chapter called "Gay Imperialism: Gender and Sexuality Discourse in the 'War on Terror'", Jin Haritaworn, Tamsila Tauqir and Esra Erdem wrote, "rather than help, politics such as Tatchell's have worsened the situation for the majority of queer Muslims. It has become increasingly difficult for groups such as the Safra Project, who are forced into the frontline of the artificially constructed gay v. Muslim divide, to contest sexual oppression in Muslim communities. The more homophobia is constructed as belonging to Islam, the more anti-homophobic talk will be viewed as a white, even racist, phenomenon, and the harder it will be to increase tolerance and understanding among straight Muslims [...] The dialogue which Safra and other queer Muslim groups have long sought over this is more often than not ignored or disregarded, and white gay activists such as Tatchell have proved indifferent to the fact that the mud which they sling onto Muslim communities lands on queer Muslims themselves."

Despite previously attending a "rally for free expression", where the Jyllands-Posten Muhammad cartoons were celebrated, Tatchell sued the small publisher Raw Nerve Books, who issued an apology, and replaced links to the book on their site with that apology, but were later forced to shut down. The Monthly Review described this as censorship, adding, "the violent suppression of "Gay Imperialism" and the book in which it appeared also works as a warning to the authors, editors, and other critics and potential critics of Tatchell to better keep their mouths shut."

====== Yusuf al-Qaradawi ======
In July 2004, then-Mayor of London Ken Livingstone invited Yusuf al-Qaradawi to attend a talk called "A woman's right to choose" about the wearing of the hijab. Livingstone had read positive coverage of Qaradawi in The Guardian and The Sun.

In October 2004, 2,500 Muslim academics from 23 countries condemned Qaradawi, and accused him of giving "Islam a bad name and foster[ing] hatred among civilizations" and "providing a religious cover for terrorism".

Tatchell argued that Qaradawi expresses liberal positions to deceive the Western press and politicians, while being "rightwing, misogynist, anti-semitic and homophobic", using his books and fatwas to advocate female genital mutilation, blame for rape victims who dress immodestly, and the execution of apostates, homosexuals, and women who have sex outside marriage.

Livingstone issued a 2005 dossier praising Qaradawi as a moderate, based on positive press coverage he had received previously. Livingstone pronounced that Tatchell has "a long history of Islamophobia", and asserted that he is in a "de facto alliance with the American neo-cons and Israeli intelligence services." Tatchell strenuously denied the accusations, pointing out that he has never said any of the things that Livingstone accused him of saying. Livingstone continued to describe Qaradawi as "one of the leading progressive voices in the Muslim world" in 2010, after having been denied entry to the UK for his extremist views.

Two years after condemning Tatchell, Livingstone stated he "probably shouldn't" have called Tatchell an "Islamophobe".

====== Adam Yosef ======
In December 2005, Respect Party activist Adam Yosef came under criticism for an article in Desi Xpress opposing registered civil partnerships. He asserted that Tatchell needed "a good slap in the face" and his "queer campaign army" should "pack their bent bags and head back to Australia". Desi Xpress staff expressed regret to Tatchell and gave him a right of reply, while Yosef apologised and retracted his article, claiming the "slap in the face" remark was a "figure of speech" and the remark about Australia was not racist. Yosef later backed Tatchell's 2009 election campaign.

== Writing ==
Tatchell has written numerous articles in newspapers and magazines related to his various campaigns. He was highly critical of the media coverage of the Admiral Duncan pub bombing, claiming that the homophobic attitudes of news outlets had helped fuel the attack, and that the press concerned themselves almost exclusively with the one heterosexual victim, rather than the two other deaths and the dozens of maimed patrons, saying that:

As soon as it became known that not all the victims of the blast were gay, the media suddenly de-gayed its coverage by focusing almost exclusively on the heterosexual victims. The News of the World led with "Pregnant wife killed", and The Sun reassured its readers that "the victims were certainly not all gay". Nik Moore, the gay man who died, was not even mentioned in The Mail on Sunday, and he was relegated to a footnote in The Mirror.

In 1987 Tatchell appeared on the second programme of the first series of After Dark, a discussion on press ethics with, among others, Tony Blackburn, Victoria Gillick, Johnny Edgecombe and Paul Halloran, a Private Eye journalist.

On 5 August 1995, Tatchell was interviewed at length by Andrew Neil on his one-on-one interview show Is This Your Life?, made by Open Media for Channel 4.

As of 2009, he has been an Ambassador for the penal reform group, Make Justice Work.

In 2011, he became the Director of the Peter Tatchell Foundation.

Tatchell is a patron of Humanists UK, an Honorary Associate of the National Secular Society and a committed secularist, saying, "As an atheist, secularist and humanist I believe that reason, science and ethics—not religious superstition—are the best way to understand the world and promote human rights and welfare."

He contributes to The Jeremy Vine Show on BBC Radio 2.

=== Role models ===
Tatchell chose Malcolm X as his specialist subject when appearing on Celebrity Mastermind, explaining that he considered him an inspiration and a hero (his other inspirations were Mahatma Gandhi, Sylvia Pankhurst and Martin Luther King Jr.). On Malcolm X's birthday in 2005, Tatchell endorsed Bruce Perry's biography of the African American activist in an article calling for black gay role models, outlining the book's reports of X's same-sex relationships and sex work. This led to criticism from Peter Akinti, editor of Black in Britain, who said the article was insulting and reductive; he said it was the wrong time to write about Malcolm X's alleged sex work and that gay black men did not agree with Tatchell's recommendations for role models.

== Awards ==
In 2006, New Statesman readers voted him sixth on their list of "Heroes of our time".

In 2009, he racked up multiple awards. He was named Campaigner of the Year in The Observer Ethical Awards, London Citizen of Sanctuary Award, Shaheed Nawab Akbar Khan Bugti Award (for reporting the Balochistan national liberation struggle), Evening Standard 1000 Most Influential Londoners (winning again in 2011), Liberal Voice of the Year and a Blue Plaque in recognition of his more than 40 years of human rights campaigning.

In 2010 he won Total Politics Top 50 Political Influencers. A diary journalist reported rumours that he had been recommended for the award of a life peerage in the British New Year Honours. He was said to have turned it down.

In 2012, the National Secular Society awarded Tatchell Secularist of the Year, in recognition of his lifelong commitment to the defence of human rights against religious fundamentalism.

On 21 September 2012, he was awarded a Lifetime Achievement award at the UK's first National Diversity Awards. Alongside Misha B, Jody Cundy, Peter Norfolk and others he was a patron for 2013 National Diversity Awards.

In January 2014, Tatchell was awarded an Honorary Doctorate of Laws by De Montfort University.

In 2024, the National Portrait Gallery in London acquired a portrait of Tatchell by Sarah Jane Moon for its permanent collection.

== Legacy ==
The Peter Tatchell Papers are held at the London School of Economics in the Hall Carpenter Archive. Supplementary papers are housed at the British Library. The papers can be accessed through the British Library catalogue.

=== Peter Tatchell Foundation ===
The Peter Tatchell Foundation (PTF) is a non-profit, nonpartisan organisation based in the United Kingdom which "seeks to promote and protect the human rights of individuals, communities and nations, in the UK and internationally, in accordance with established national and international human rights law" and its stated aims and objectives are "to raise awareness, understanding, protection and implementation of human rights, in the UK and worldwide". Tatchell started the Foundation as a company in 2011, which gained charitable status in 2018. The organisation was named after Tatchell to honour his 50+ years of globally campaigning for human rights. The charity's celebrity patrons included Sir Ian McKellen and Paul O'Grady, who died in March 2023.

The organisation works with a variety of human rights issues globally, such as homophobia, transphobia, sexism, gender inequality, racism, political freedom, censorship, religious discrimination, unjust detention, freedom of association, capital punishment, asylum and refugees, trade union rights, self-determination of oppressed peoples, torture, genocide, war crimes, crimes against humanity and poverty.

In 2012 the foundation gained funding from The Funding Network for three projects: "Casework & Advice", including adding an "Advice" section to its website; "Equal Love", campaigning on same-sex marriage and opposite-sex civil partnerships; and "Olympic Equality Initiative", working against sexism and homophobia in the Olympic movement.

== Bibliography ==
- Tatchell, Peter (1983). The Battle for Bermondsey. Heretic Books. ISBN 0-946097-10-0.
- Tatchell, Peter (1985). Democratic Defense. Millivres-Prowler Group Ltd. ISBN 0-946097-16-X.
- Tatchell, Peter (1987). AIDS: a Guide to Survival. Gay Men's Press. ISBN 0-85449-067-1.
- Tatchell, Peter (1990). Out in Europe. A guide to lesbian and gay rights in 30 European countries. Channel Four Television. ISBN 1-85144-010-0.
- Tatchell, Peter (1992). Europe in the Pink. Gay Men's Press. ISBN 0-85449-158-9.
- Tatchell, Peter; Taylor, Robert (1994). Safer Sexy: the Guide to Gay Sex Safely. Freedom Editions. ISBN 1-86047-000-9.
- Tatchell, Peter (1995). We Don't Want to March Straight: Masculinity, Queers and the Military. Cassell. ISBN 0-304-33373-5.

=== Documentary ===
Tatchell was the subject of the widely-acclaimed Netflix documentary Hating Peter Tatchell.

== See also ==
- Capital Gay
- LGBT Network
- List of LGBT rights activists
- List of peace activists

== Sources ==
- Lucas, Ian (1998). OutRage!: an oral history. London: Cassell. ISBN 0-304-33358-1.
- Power, Lisa (1995). No Bath But Plenty of Bubbles: An Oral History Of The Gay Liberation Front 1970-7. Cassell. ISBN 0-304-33205-4.
- Walter, Aubrey (1980). Come together: the years of gay liberation (1970–73). Gay Men's Press. ISBN 0-907040-04-7.
