= J-FLAG =

Jamaican LGBT advocacy group

- Jamaica Forum for Lesbians, All-Sexuals and Gays
- Formation: 1998; 28 years ago
- Type: LGBTQ rights
- Region served: Jamaica
- Affiliations: C-FLAG

J-FLAG, the Jamaica Forum for Lesbians, All-Sexuals and Gays, is an LGBT rights organisation in Jamaica, founded in 1998, and works for the human rights of lesbians, all-sexuals, and gays in Jamaica and the world. It is part of the Caribbean Forum of Lesbians, All-Sexuals and Gays (C-FLAG).

LGBT civil rights organisations outside the country highlighted homophobic bigotry and violence in Jamaica before the founding of J-Flag, most publicly in the Stop Murder Music campaign calling for censorship of homophobic lyrics in dancehall music, and sexual minorities remain at risk of physical violence. The group runs the Stop Murder Music campaign jointly with the Black Gay Men's Advisory Group and OutRage!.

In response J-FLAG offers legal reform and advocacy, education, and social services and support. The group was unable to continue regular safe-space/fund-raiser/social events, lymes held monthly until August 2001, due to the inability to accommodate the growing number of attendees. They advocate inclusion of sexual orientation in the Jamaican constitution as well as on behalf of individuals seeking asylum in the United Kingdom and Canada.

In 2026, it changed its name to "Equality for All."

== See also ==
- Crime in Jamaica § Violence against homosexuals
- LGBT rights in Jamaica
- Thomas Glave
