= Bolton Law Courts =

Judicial building in Bolton, England

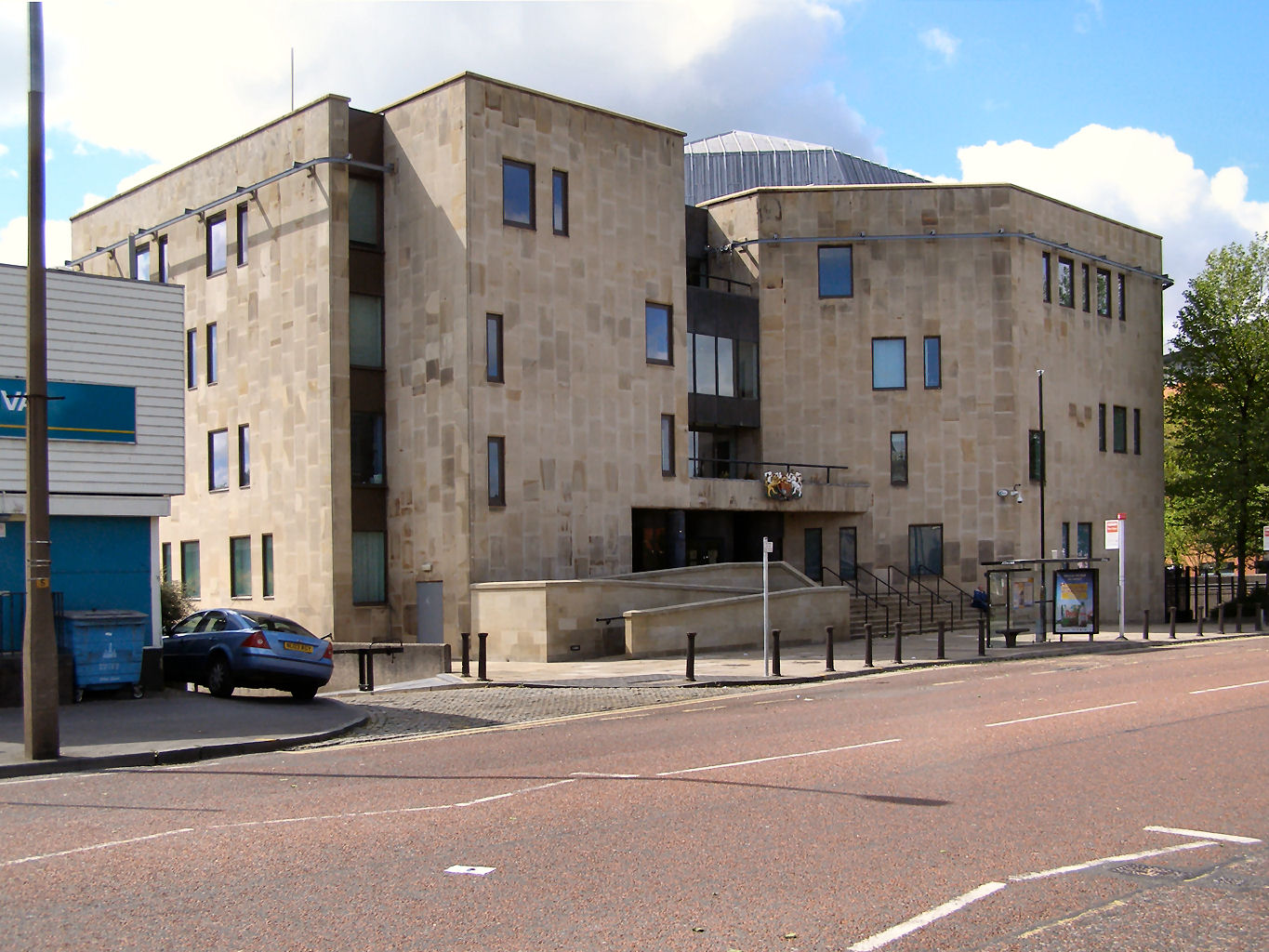
- Bolton Law Courts

- Shown in Greater Manchester
- 53.5781°N 2.4337°W
- Location: Black Horse Street, Bolton

History
- Built: 1982

Site notes
- Architect: Property Services Agency
- Architectural style: Modernist style

Bolton Law Courts is a Crown Court venue, which deals with criminal cases, and a County Court venue, which deals with civil cases, in Black Horse Street, Bolton, England.

== History ==
For much of the 19th century major criminal trials in Bolton were held in Little Bolton Town Hall before being transferred to the Bolton County Police Court in Castle Street in 1876. Bolton County Police Court continued to be a venue for major criminal trials during the 20th century. However, as the number of criminal cases in the Bolton area grew, it became necessary to commission a more modern courthouse. The site selected by the Lord Chancellor's Department, on the west side of Black Horse Street, had been occupied by Deansgate Goods Station.

The new building was designed by the Property Services Agency in the modernist style, built in stone at a cost of £4 million, and was completed in 1982. The design involved an asymmetrical main frontage of three sections facing onto Black Horse Street. The central section featured an opening containing a revolving doorway, with a column to the left supporting a balcony to which a Royal coat of arms was fixed. The central section was fenestrated by rows of casement windows on the first, second and third floors, with that on the second floor projected forward. The left hand section, which was rectangle-shaped, and the right hand section, which was hexagon-shaped, were both irregularly fenestrated with a mixture of square casement windows and lancet windows. Internally, the complex was laid out to accommodate six courtrooms. The architectural historian, Nikolaus Pevsner, was critical of the design, describing it as looking "more like a relic from the distant past than a recent addition to the town".

A sculpture by Dame Barbara Hepworth, entitled "Two Forms", was placed outside the building shortly after it opened but was subsequently moved to a site in front of Senate House of the University of Bolton.

Notable cases include the trial and conviction of a group of gay and bisexual men, in January 1998, for gross indecency under the Sexual Offences Act 1956; after a public campaign supported by the political groups, OutRage! and Liberty, the men did not receive custodial sentences and were eventually awarded compensation. Other cases have included the trial and conviction of a builder, Christopher Taylor, in August 2019, for the murder of his former partner, Maggie Smythe.
