= Stop Murder Music =

LGBT advocacy campaign

Stop Murder Music was a campaign to oppose Jamaican artists who produced music that promoted violence against LGBT people through their lyrics. The campaign primarily focused on dancehall and reggae genre, with artists such as Buju Banton, Bounty Killer, and the Bobo Ashanti Rastafarians Sizzla and Capleton being targeted.

The campaign was jointly run by OutRage!, the Black Gay Men's Advisory Group, and J-Flag. The campaign caused an estimated £2.5 million loss to artists and promoters.

== United Kingdom ==
The Stop Murder Music campaign targeted artists whose lyrics allegedly glorified murder of homosexual men. J-Flag, a Jamaican gay rights group who supported the campaign, claimed that homophobic lyrics fuelled attacks and murders of gay men in Jamaica.

Peter Tatchell was heavily involved in the campaign, as the head of OutRage!. He argued that the music could be considered incitement to murder, and should be legally treated as such. However, he faced accusations of racism from some artists and commentators for his part in the campaign.

The Green Party of England and Wales also campaigned on behalf of the stop murder music campaign, including petitioning the United Kingdom Home Secretary in 2004.

The UK International Development Minister Gareth Thomas argued in a speech that, "A number of artists [such as Sizzla and Buju Banton] are effectively contributing to the spread of HIV by producing reggae and rap songs actually encouraging discrimination against those who have AIDS and encouraging violence against minority groups such as men who have sex with men...Yes, we believe in free speech, but nobody in a democracy should be able to incite violence against minorities." He cited John King and the Mighty Gabby as examples of musicians who are positive role models against violence and discrimination.

Buju Banton was a prominent protest target for protests due to his song "Boom Bye Bye", a song where he sings about murdering gay men by shooting them in the head, pouring acid on them, and burning them alive.

=== MOBO Awards ===
OutRage! first picketed outside the MOBO Awards in 2002.

In August 2004, OutRage! called on the organisers of the Mobo Awards to drop the nominations of Elephant Man and Vybz Kartel, due to their homophobic lyrics. Stonewall and J-Flag backed the call. Dennis Carney, chair of the Black Gay Men's Advisory Group, argued that the MOBO Awards had a responsibility to exclude anti-gay artists because, "homophobic lyrics in music normalise hatred towards black gay men." The MOBO Award organisers publicly responded, stating that they don't condone homophobic lyrics, and called for apologies from the artists. They ultimately dropped Elephant Man and Vybz Kartel from their nominees due to the campaign.

The Black Music Council was formed by Blacker Dread, in response to the campaign against the MOBO awards. They accused the gay rights groups of intimidation, claiming that the artists had the right to free speech. They claimed they needed "to protect the rights of the eight artists placed on the OutRage! hit list". The Black Music Council went on to disrupt the 2004 MOBO Awards, with around 60 members playing bongos and shouting "defend reggae music".

OutRage! called on the Home Secretary to issue exclusion orders to prevent the artists from attending the awards ceremony in London.

=== Reggae Compassionate Act ===
The Reggae Compassionate Act was an agreement created in 2007 by the Stop Murder Music campaign. The Act called for love, respect, and understanding from artists, and for them to uphold the rights of all individuals regardless of their sexuality. Beenie Man, Capleton, Buju Banton, and Sizzla signed the agreement in 2007. However some artists have felt it was badly worded, and some commentators were sceptical that it would bring about any change, arguing that artists were simply signing it for financial gain. Some artists later denied signing the act, despite their agents saying they had. Others (including Elephant Man, T.O.K., Bounty Killa, and Vybz Kartel) have simply refused to sign it.

== Impact ==
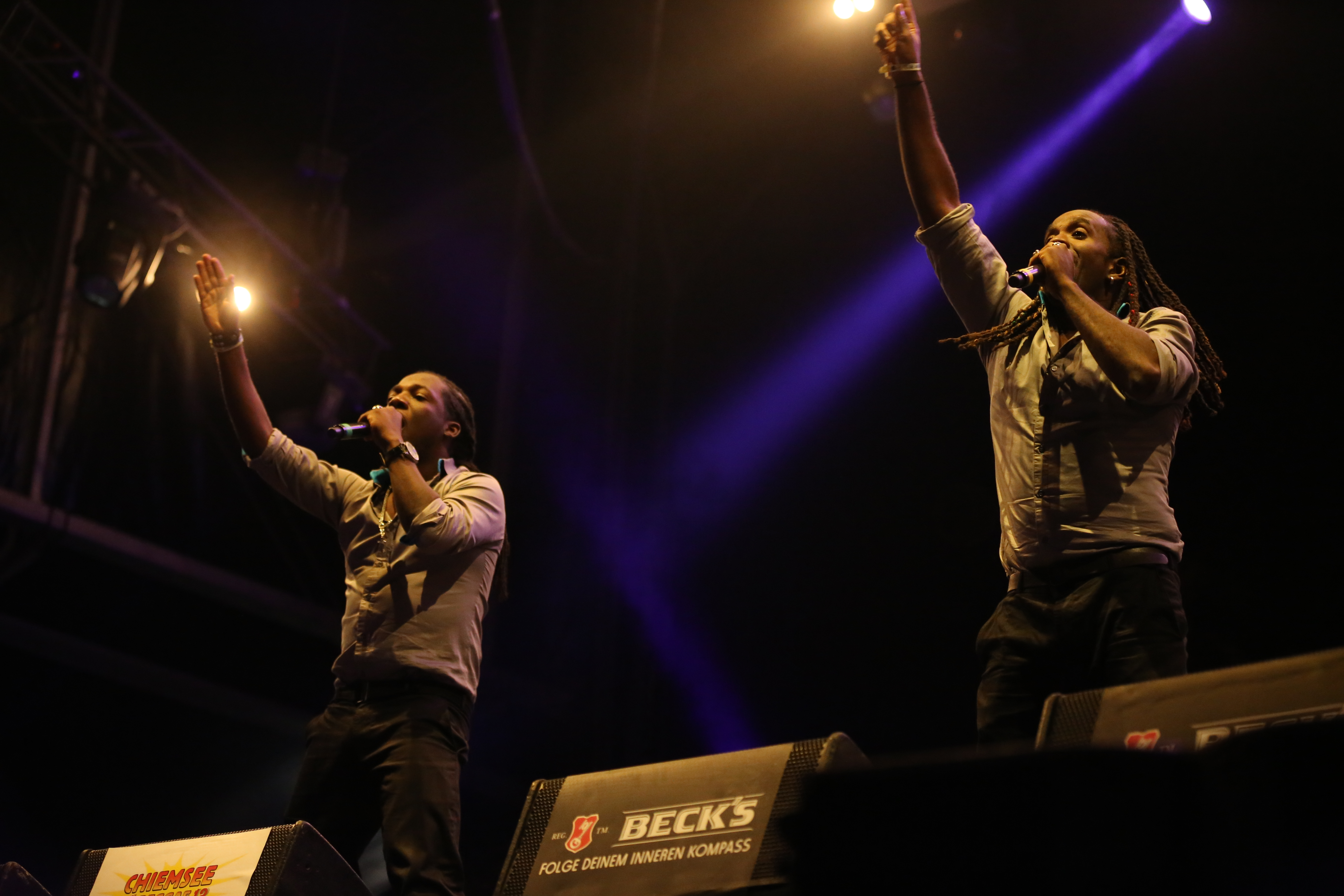
The Jamaican dancehall group T.O.K. were among several artists who refused to sign the Reggae Compassionate Act.

As a result of the campaign, many artists had gigs cancelled.

Beenie Man apologised for his lyrics. As a direct result of the Stop Murder Music campaign, MTV cancelled a planned concert featuring him in Miami. Police also forced one of his London shows to be cancelled in June 2004.

Capleton had seven US events cancelled, following planned protests from gay activists. Capleton refused to back down on his views, and in an interview with the Santa Cruz Sentinel claimed that homosexuality is “against humanity. It’s against your mother, it’s against your father, it’s against yourself.”

Police cancelled a planned Buju Banton's concert in Manchester due to the concern over potential protesters. Between 2005–2011, 27 of his shows were cancelled due to complaints or planned protests. Banton stopped performing “Boom Bye Bye” in 2007, after signing The Reggae Compassionate Act. In 2017, Banton pointed out that he was 15 when he wrote the song, and that he was determined to put the song behind him. He removed the song from his catalogue, removing it from streaming services including Apple Music and Spotify.

A London reggae festival was completely cancelled, as artists including Elephant Man, Beenie Man, and Vybz Kartel were due to perform.

Sizzla was due to play five gigs in November 2004, but all shows were ultimately cancelled. He missed the first date of the tour after he missed his flight from Jamaica due to visa delays. The four other shows were cancelled by the venues, on advice of local police, and councils. Scotland Yard's racial and violent crime task force opened an investigation into Sizzla for incitement to murder. Despite signing the Reggae Compassionate Act in 2007, Sizzla has continued to be vocally homophobic, accusing gay people of corrupting children. In 2022, he covered Buju Banton's “Boom Bye Bye”, at a live show, replacing one of the controversial lyrics “dem haffi dead” with “dem haffi gweh”.

Beenie Man, Capleton, Buju Banton, Elephant Man, and Bounty Hunter were investigated by the Crown Prosecution Service, as they considered if they should be prosecuted for lyrics that allegedly incite violence against gays.

The Black Music Council claimed the campaign had impacted every aspect of the music industry, effecting club managers, artists, and managers. They claimed the campaign had caused Reggae and Dancehall music to be pulled from shelves of high street stores.

The Stop Murder Music campaign won the Advocacy Award at the 2007 Black LGBT Community Awards.

== Canada ==
Stop Murder Music (Canada) is an independent branch of the organization in Canada, founded by Akim Adé Larcher, after learning at a local West Indian store about a Canadian Tour by Elephant Man. Larcher, a Canadian/Saint Lucian, brought together over 20 organizations from the African and Caribbean communities in Canada to form the group.

Despite not causing any artists to be denied entry visas, the campaign was able to get concert venues cancelled, and also get iTunes to remove some tracks by Buju Banton, Elephant Man and TOK that they deemed contrary to their standards.

== See also ==
- LGBT rights in Jamaica
