= Simon Watney =

British art historian and AIDS activist

Simon Watney (born 1949) is a British writer, art historian, and AIDS activist.

He studied art history at the University of Sussex, and then at the Courtauld Institute in London.

He lectured in Aesthetics and Communications at the Polytechnic of Central London, now the University of Westminster.

His 1987 article, "The Spectacle of AIDS", was included in The Gay and Lesbian Studies Reader. He also published Policing Desire: Pornography, AIDS and the Media in 1986. He co-founded OutRage! in 1990, and he and Keith Alcorn and Chris Woods set up its first meeting. He published Imagine Hope: AIDS and the Gay Identity in 2000.

== Publications ==
- Watney, Simon (1977). Bloomsbury Abstraction: 1913–1916 (MA thesis). University of London. OCLC 272491553.
- Watney, Simon (1980). English Post-Impressionism. London: Eastview Editions. ISBN 978-0-89860-039-1.
- Watney, Simon (1984). Fantastic Painters. Bracken Books. ISBN 978-0-946495-20-7.
- Watney, Simon (1986). Policing Desire: Pornography, AIDS and the Media. Media & society. Vol. 1. London: Routledge. ISBN 978-1-85178-022-8. JSTOR 10.5749/j.ctttv4sn.
- Carter, Erica; Watney, Simon, eds. (1989). Taking Liberties: AIDS and cultural politics. London: Serpent's Tail. ISBN 978-1-85242-147-2.
- Watney, Simon (1990). The Art of Duncan Grant. London: John Murray. ISBN 978-0-7195-4641-9.
- Watney, Simon (1994). Practices of Freedom: Selected Writings on HIV/AIDS. London: Rivers Oram. ISBN 978-1-8548-9043-6.
- Watney, Simon (2000). Imagine Hope. London: Routledge. ISBN 978-1-84142-058-5.
- Watney, Simon (2007). 20 Sussex Churches. Snake River Press. ISBN 978-1-906022-00-6.
- Watney, Simon (2007). Bloomsbury in Sussex. Snake River Press. ISBN 978-1-906022-05-1.
