= Ikonz =

British entertainment magazine

- Angelina Jolie on the November 2007 cover.
- Editor: Reena Combo
- Categories: Entertainment
- Frequency: Monthly
- Publisher: AEM Worldwide
- Founded: 2006
- First issue: December 2006
- Final issue: 2011
- Country: United Kingdom
- Language: English

Ikonz is a national entertainment magazine published in the United Kingdom. It was a print magazine between 2006 and 2011.

== Background ==
The publication was launched as a regional monthly glossy in December 2006 by AEM Worldwide. Its official national UK launch took place in February 2007.

Ikonz caters for young British Asians, focusing on the film and music industry in both Hollywood and Bollywood. The magazine also carries mainstream British celebrity gossip, fashion and entertainment stories throughout.

== Content ==
Ikonz is primarily aimed at British Asian women, although not as directly as in other Asian magazines. Initially, the publication balanced editorial for both male and female audiences with distinct urban influences. Following a revamp in September 2007, a large portion of the magazine adopted a more female orientated theme with equal coverage afforded to mainstream content.

A series of high-profile mainstream interviews, including exclusives with Halle Berry, Jessica Alba, and Jennifer Lopez, have encouraged the growth of the publication. These, along with Brit-Asian and urban interviews such as Boyz II Men, Keisha White, Richard Blackwood, Jay Sean and 50 Cent, have allowed the publication to increase its appeal

However, the magazine's key south Asian content remains in the form of Bollywood interviews with A-list artists including Amitabh Bachchan, Shah Rukh Khan, Shilpa Shetty, Aishwarya Rai and Bipasha Basu. In July 2007, it ran special coverage of the IIFA awards. Also featured heavily are British Bhangra artists.

Ikonz is the only British Asian publication to have regular contributions from mainstream celebrities. In October 2007, actors Kevin Sacre, Ricky Whittle and Sam Darbyshire from television soap Hollyoaks appeared in a special Halloween photo feature for the magazine, alongside presenters from the BBC Asian Network. The feature was reproduced by national publications including the Daily Star and More (magazine).

The magazine took the step to support glamour model Katie Price in November 2007, following the publication in Heat (magazine) of an offensive sticker mocking Price's son Harvey.

== Personnel ==
The editor of Ikonz is Reena Combo, with Adam Yosef as the sub editor.

The magazine's editorial team includes editorial assistants, contributors, international correspondents and freelance writers and photographers.

== New Media ==
Ikonz magazine is complemented by a website, an online video channel, a blog and online profiles including myspace and facebook. These mediums are edited by the Ikonz New Media Team and are an online interpretation of the magazine's style and 'personality'. In September 2007, the magazine launched a television advertising campaign.

In February 2011, Ikonz magazine was relaunched as an online-only format, rebranded as 'Ikonz World'.

== Charity ==
In December 2007, Ikonz donated Christmas gifts to the Birmingham Children's Hospital.

== Recognition ==
- In December 2007, Ikonz became the only ethnic partner for Clothes Show Live.
- In December 2007, the magazine became an official partner of the Asian Style Awards, due to be held in 2008.
- In November 2007, editor Reena Combo was nominated by the Institute of Asian Business (IAB), a division of the Birmingham Chamber of Commerce, as Outstanding Woman in Business 2007.
- In August 2007, Ikonz joined forces with Madame Tussauds to select the next Bollywood star to appear at the London attraction.
- In June 2007, Ikonz was appointed an official partner to the IIFA awards, held in Yorkshire.
