= Thomas Glave =

American author

Thomas Glave is an American academic and author.

== Biography ==
Born to Jamaican parents in The Bronx, New York, Glave grew up there and in Kingston, Jamaica. He earned a B.A. degree from Bowdoin College in 1993 (Cum laude, English and Latin American Studies) and a Master of Fine Arts degree in Creative Writing from Brown University in 1998. He is a member of the English faculty at Binghamton University, where he teaches creative writing and courses on Caribbean, African-American, black British, postcolonial, and L.G.B.T./queer literatures, among other topics. Glave possesses dual Jamaican and U.S. citizenship. He is gay.

== Awards ==
A two-time New York Foundation for the Arts Fellow, Glave's early short story, "The Final Inning", originally published in The Kenyon Review, won an O. Henry Award in 1997 while Glave was a graduate student at Brown University. With this award, Glave became the second and only gay African American writer, after James Baldwin, to have won an O. Henry Award. "The Final Inning" appears in Glave's first fiction collection, Whose Song? and Other Stories, published by City Lights in 2000. Glave's essay collection Words to Our Now: Imagination and Dissent followed Whose Song? in 2005, and won a Lambda Literary Award in 2006. Glave earned a second Lambda Literary Award in 2009 for his groundbreaking anthology, Our Caribbean: A Gathering of Lesbian and Gay Writing from the Antilles (Duke University Press, 2008). The Torturer's Wife, published by City Lights in 2008, was shortlisted and named a finalist for the Dayton Literary Peace Prize, the Stonewall Book Award, the William Saroyan International Prize for Writing, and the Lambda Literary Award.

Glave has also earned a Fine Arts Work Center in Provincetown Fellowship (1995–96) and a Fulbright Fellowship to Jamaica (1998–99). While in Jamaica that year, he worked on issues of social justice and helped found the Jamaica Forum for Lesbians, All-Sexuals, and Gays (J-FLAG). In 2008, he was invited to MIT to teach as the Martin Luther King Jr. Visiting Professor in the Program in Writing and Humanistic Studies. In 2009 he was named an Out Magazine "100" honoree. He has been a visiting fellow at Clare Hall, University of Cambridge (2012–13), and Leverhulme Trust Visiting Professor in the Department of Hispanic Studies at the University of Warwick (2014–15).

== Publications ==
- Glave, Thomas (2000). Whose song? and other stories. San Francisco: City Lights Publishers. ISBN 978-0-87286-375-0.
- Glave, Thomas (2005). Words to Our Now: Imagination and Dissent. University of Minnesota Press. ISBN 978-0-8166-4679-1.
- Glave, Thomas, ed. (2008). Our Caribbean: A Gathering of Lesbian and Gay Writing from the Antilles. Duke University Press Books. ISBN 978-0-8223-4226-7.
- Glave, Thomas (2013). Among the Bloodpeople: Politics and Flesh. New York: Akashic Books. ISBN 978-1-61775-170-7 – via Internet Archive.
- Glave, Thomas (2013). The Torturer's Wife. City Lights Publishers. ISBN 978-0-87286-640-9 – via Internet Archive.
- Glave, Thomas (2024). "Fires in Our Time" in Encounters with James Baldwin: Celebrating 100 Years. London: Supernova Books. ISBN 9781913641412
