= Sarah Jane Moon =

New Zealand-born British portrait painter

Sarah Jane Moon is a New Zealand-born British portrait painter known for her representations of LGBTQ+ individuals and cultural figures. Her work is characterised by vibrant color, expressive realism, and a commitment to depicting contemporary queer lives. Moon’s portraits have been exhibited at major institutions including the National Portrait Gallery in London and the New Zealand Portrait Gallery. She has also exhibited with the Royal Society of Portrait Painters.

== Early life and education ==
Sarah Jane Moon was born in New Zealand and initially trained in languages and art history. She later studied Fine Art at the Heatherley School of Fine Art in London, specialising in portraiture.

== Artistic career ==
Moon is known for creating large-scale, vividly colored portraits of LGBTQ+ individuals, often highlighting themes of identity, gender, and community. Her work challenges traditional portraiture by foregrounding underrepresented groups.

She has exhibited in the BP Portrait Award, where her portrait of Dr Ronx featured prominently in the 2019 exhibition's publicity. Her work has also been shown at the Royal Society of Portrait Painters, the New Zealand Portrait Gallery, and internationally in group and solo exhibitions.

In 2024, the National Portrait Gallery acquired her portrait of LGBTQ+ activist Peter Tatchell, which is now part of its permanent collection. She was also elected the Chair of the Contemporary British Portrait Painters in the same year.

Moon was also awarded the Bulldog Bursary for Portraiture and the Arts Charitable Trust Award.

== Style and themes ==
Moon's work frequently explores contemporary queer identity, often depicting artists, activists, and thinkers within LGBTQ+ communities. Her sitters include Peter Tatchell, campaigner Jonathan Blake, and photographer Lola Flash.

== Recognition ==
Moon’s contributions to contemporary portraiture and LGBTQ+ visibility in art have been acknowledged in mainstream and art media alike. Publications including The Guardian, Artists & Illustrators, and Big Issue North have featured her work.

== Personal life ==
Moon is queer and has spoken about the importance of visibility and diversity in the arts.
