= The Asian Today =

Free newspaper distributed in the UK Midlands

- Type: Biweekly newspaper
- Owner: The Asian Today Ltd
- Founded: September 2002
- Language: English
- Headquarters: 6A Olton Wharf, Richmond Road, Solihull, United Kingdom
- City: Midlands, England
- Website: theasiantoday.com

The Asian Today is a free fortnightly community newspaper published and distributed in the Midlands, England.

It is a community newspaper providing the region's south-Asian community access to important news stories, current events and encouraging community interaction and dialogue as well as provoking debate and discussion.

The Asian Today began in September 2002 under its original name, The Asian Leader, before briefly adopting Your Leader in August 2005 and then permanently rebranding itself as The Asian Today in September 2005.

The newspaper is one of the few English-language newspapers circulated in the Asian community but is said to be the widest read ethnic newspaper in the Midlands. Its distribution and readership spans Birmingham, Nottingham, Leicester, Walsall, Wolverhampton and Coventry, largely encompassing areas with a high south-Asian population where it can be collected in takeaways, supermarkets, taxi ranks, community centres and entertainment and cultural outlets.

The newspaper has broken numerous national stories including an exclusive interview with Dr Mohammad Naseem on the subject of terrorism, which was followed up by the mainstream press as well as shocking revelations of systematic abuse of a veiled Muslim woman, Mrs Mahfooz Bibi, at the hands of police officers, which was widely cited by national and international press and in religious and cultural forums and even picked up by the Muslim Voice UK. Most recently, the newspaper featured the threat of violent protests from prominent UK Sikh leader, Sewa Singh Mandla, after the Sikh community was angered by the Bollywood film, Jo Bole So Nihaal, which they believed committed sacrilege and also exposed the case of a Blackheath imam who was suing a lottery-funded mosque.

The newspaper is published by Birmingham-based Urban Media Ltd. who also produce Desi Xpress. The editor of The Asian Today is Zakia Yousaf.

== Related links ==
- The Asian Today
- Desi Xpress

== Media coverage ==
All of the stories relating to Mahfooz Bibi were published after the Asian Leader Midlands broke the story and the subsequent follow-up.

- "West Midlands Police 'Racist' - Alleged Systematic Abuse", IndyMedia UK
- "Police accused in veil dispute", Evening Mail
- "West Midlands Police 'Racist' - Alleged Systematic Abuse", Mathaba News
- "Police force Muslim woman to remove veil", Muslim Voice UK
- "Police force Muslim woman to remove veil", www.Islam4you.co.uk
- "Government accused of 'creating' terror threat", Evening Mail
