= Black Gay Men's Advisory Group =

UK LGBT rights organisation

- Formation: 2003
- Type: Gay men's organisation based in the United Kingdom
- Purpose: Advocacy, Health services
- Official language: English

The Black Gay Men's Advisory Group is an LGBT rights organisation of African-descended gay or bisexual men founded in 2003 in the United Kingdom. The group was founded to advise health workers and organisations but activities expanded to a variety of "life chances" and related services.

BGMAG was one of the principal groups involved in the Stop Murder Music campaign, for which it was awarded a Gay & Lesbian Award in 2007, and accepted the Best Advocacy Award at the Black LGBT Community Awards gala on behalf of the Stop Murder Music campaign. Chair Dennis Carney, of Jamaican descent, was a principal negotiator of the Reggae Compassionate Act with artists Beenie Man, Sizzla, and Capleton.

BGMA supported the Stop Murder Music campaign against certain artists at the Mobo Awards, with Carney arguing that, "we reject the notion that homophobia is integral to black culture."
