= OutRage! =

British advocacy group for LGBT+ rights

- Formation: 1990
- Founder: Keith Alcorn; Peter Tatchell; Simon Watney; Chris Woods
- Dissolved: 2011
- Type: LGBTQ
- Legal status: Ad hoc
- Purpose: Activism for LGBT rights
- Region served: United Kingdom
- Co-treasurers: Michael C. Burgess; Steve Stannard
- Website: outrage.org.uk

OutRage! was a British political group focused on lesbian and gay rights. Founded in 1990, the organisation ran for 21 years until 2011. It described itself as "a broad based group of queers committed to radical, non-violent direct action and civil disobedience" and was formed to advocate that lesbian, gay and bisexual people have the same rights as heterosexual people, to end homophobia and to affirm the right of queer people to their "sexual freedom, choice and self-determination".

== Formation ==
The group was formed on 10 May 1990, called after the murder of gay actor Michael Boothe (which occurred on the previous 30 April). Between 40 and 60 people attended the first meeting, set up by Keith Alcorn, Chris Woods and Simon Watney, including many such as Peter Tatchell who had been active in the Gay Liberation Front and other campaigns. The founders of the group are considered to be Keith Alcorn, Chris Woods, Simon Watney and Peter Tatchell.

A second meeting, this time in public, was held on 24 May. Alcorn came up with the name of the group and Tatchell wrote the first draft of what became the Statement of Aims. Michael C. Burgess and Steve Stannard were elected as joint treasurers. The first OutRage! action was on 7 June at Hyde Park Public Toilets to protest against Metropolitan Police entrapment of gay men cruising, and attracted some media attention. OLGA offered the group office space at its base at the London Lesbian and Gay Centre, and regular fundraising was set up with the group selling T-shirts with its logo. One of the defining images of OutRage! actions was taken in September 1990 when the group organised a "kiss-in" at Piccadilly Circus to protest against arrests of gay men for kissing in public. One member, identified as an actor called Richard, climbed up and kissed the statue of Anteros.

From January 1991 the group established a series of "affinity, focus and caucus groups", which took on specific aspects of the group's remit. They were given intentionally obscene and insulting names: the Policing Intelligence Group (PIG), the Whores of Babylon (tackling religious homophobia), Perverts Undermining State ScrutinY (PUSSY - tackling censorship), QUeers Asserting the Right to Ride Every Line Safely (QUARRELS - on safety on London Underground), Expanding The Non-Indigenous Contingent (ETHNIC), and Lesbians Answer Back In Anger (LABIA). To go along with these names, the financial team adopted the name QUeer Accountants Never Go Out (QUANGO).

== Outing controversy ==
The issue of outing, which had already begun in the United States, split the group in 1998. There was no consensus and so the group agreed to have no policy. Those who favoured the tactic then established their own group outside OutRage called "Faggots Rooting Out Closeted Sexuality" (FROCS) which was committed to outing. Peter Tatchell agreed to act as public speaker for the group. The outing plan was widely denounced by the press, before FROCS admitted the plan had been a ruse with the goal of getting newspapers which had themselves outed lesbians and gay men to denounce the practice of outing.

In 1992 the group suffered from entryism from far-left political parties who wished to use OutRage! as a front organisation for other political motives. The most serious was by the Lesbian and Gay Campaign Against Racism and Fascism (LGCARF). The creation of the focus groups added to the vulnerability for a takeover and on 25 June the group took a decision to abolish all the groups. This decision was accepted by most but not by LABIA, and many of its members left, eventually to form the London chapter of the Lesbian Avengers.

== The 1993 actions ==
Lord Jakobovits, Chief Rabbi of the United Hebrew Congregations of the Commonwealth, reacted to the 1993 discovery by Dean Hamer of possible genetic connections to homosexuality. Jakobovits claimed it offered the opportunity for genetic engineering to eliminate homosexuality. OutRage! held an action outside a synagogue in London where it handed out leaflets comparing Lord Jakobovits's remarks to those of Hitler. This action brought accusations that the group was antisemitic.

Nine members of OutRage! were arrested in November 1993 in the offices of Benetton UK, where they had been organising a protest against the company's advertising. The nine were charged with various public order offences but were eventually acquitted.

== Age of consent ==
1994 saw the issue of gay rights become more prominent in British politics as the House of Commons debated whether to equalise the age of consent for gay sex, then 21, with that for heterosexual sex at 16. OutRage! had organised a series of actions over the issue in previous years and it was prominent in the crowd outside Parliament on the night of the vote, where it had called for a peaceful presence. When news came through that equality had been rejected there was a near riot. Many in the crowd shouted the names of two Conservative Cabinet ministers who were widely rumoured to be gay.

After the vote OutRage! managed to enter the Labour Party National Executive Committee meeting where it protested about the 35 Labour MPs who had voted against equality. More light-heartedly, the group petitioned the Danish embassy for an invasion so that the UK could have Denmark's more liberal legislation.

Peter Tatchell of Outrage! said in 2000: "All consenting, victimless sexual offences—homosexual and heterosexual—should be abolished, including the criminalisation of consensual adult pornography and sadomasochism. The law on the age of consent should take into account the fact that over 50 percent of young people have their first sexual experience before they are 16. Consenting sex involving partners under 16 should not be prosecuted, providing they are of similar ages and there is no evidence of pressure, manipulation or exploitation." According to OutRage! in 2000, "A 20 year old man who has consenting gay sex with a man aged 17 is categorized as a pedophile and forced to sign the Sex Offenders' Register. In contrast, a 19 year old heterosexual man who has unlawful sexual intercourse with a girl aged 13 does not have to sign the register."

Later, the amendment to the Sexual Offences Act equalised the age of consent for all sexual acts at 16 (17 in Northern Ireland). The age of consent in Northern Ireland was subsequently reduced to 16 by the Sexual Offences (Northern Ireland) Order 2008.

== Church of England ==
In autumn 1994 OutRage! began to concentrate on what it saw as religious homophobia in the Church of England. It was revealed in the press that the new Bishop of Durham Michael Turnbull had a conviction for a gay sex offence, and OutRage! disrupted his ordination ceremony. There were other Bishops known or suspected to be gay in private, and OutRage! held a demonstration outside Church House naming ten Bishops and urging them to "Tell the truth!". Although the ten bishops were not named in the British Press, their names were published in the Australian gay newspaper the Melbourne Star Observer, and have since been published on the internet. At the same time, Peter Tatchell began a dialogue with the Bishop of London, David Hope as Outrage! hoped he could be persuaded to admit he was gay. Press stories speculating about the personal sexuality of Bishops led Dr Hope to call a press conference in February 1995 at which he denounced OutRage! for putting him under pressure, while admitting that his sexuality was "a grey area".

In January 1995 OutRage! had sent 20 Members of Parliament known or believed to be gay letters inviting them to come out. On 20 March the Belfast Telegraph carried the story that one of the MPs was from Northern Ireland, widely assumed to be James Kilfedder. That day he died suddenly of a heart attack. The press immediately assumed that the death and the letter were linked and some of the fiercest denunciations of OutRage! were written.

== Bolton 7 ==
The Bolton 7 were a group of gay and bisexual men who were convicted on 12 January 1998 before Judge Michael Lever at Bolton Crown Court of the offences of gross indecency under the Sexual Offences Act 1956 and of age of consent offences under the Criminal Justice and Public Order Act 1994. Equivalent heterosexual behaviour was not a crime. Estimates of the overall cost of the prosecution were in the region of £500,000.

Despite their convictions, none of them received custodial sentences possibly as a result of a high-profile campaign led by gay human rights group OutRage!. Over 400 letters were presented to the court in support of the men including those from MPs, Bishops and human rights groups. The letters urged the judge not to impose a custodial sentence, with one group, Amnesty International, pledging to declare the men prisoners of conscience should they be imprisoned.

In 2000, six of the men appealed to the European Court of Human Rights arguing that the prosecutions against them had violated their rights under the European Convention on Human Rights by interfering with 'the right to respect for a private family life' enshrined in article 8 of the Convention. They were subsequently awarded compensation. As the remaining seventh man of the original group was not part of the litigation, he was not deemed eligible by the Home Office for the compensation.

Legislation subsequently introduced by the Labour Government broadly equalised the treatment of homosexual and heterosexual behaviours in criminal law. The offences of gross indecency and buggery were repealed and sexual activity between more than two men was no longer a crime in the United Kingdom.

== Stop Murder Music campaign ==
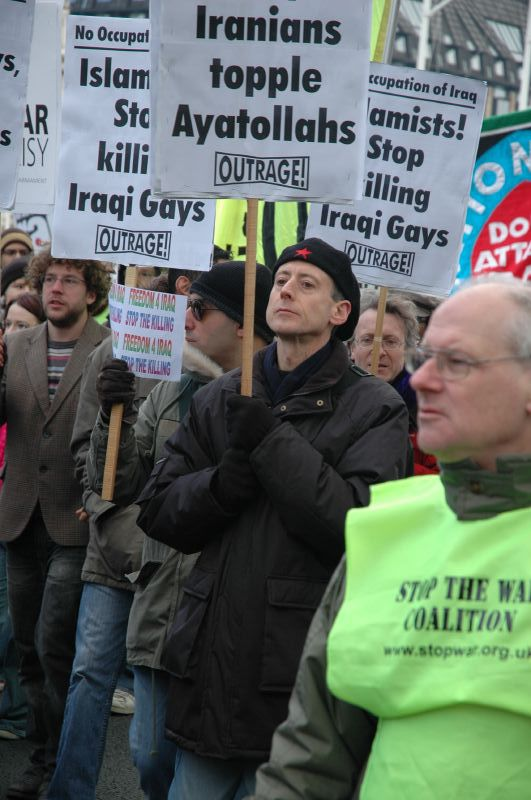
2006, OutRage! protesters against killing of Iraqi gays

OutRage! had also campaigned against the anti-gay lyrics of certain dancehall stars such as Buju Banton, Elephant Man, Sizzla, Bounty Killer, Beenie Man, Vybz Kartel, Baby Cham, Spragga Benz, and Capleton, and rap stars such as Busta Rhymes and Eminem. Sizzla had to cancel concert dates due to the protests of OutRage! There has been criticism of this campaign from Rastafarians, who accused Outrage! of racism and extremism, saying they have "gone way over the top. It’s simply racist to put Hitler and Sizzla in the same bracket and just shows how far Peter Tatchell is prepared to go."

== Papers ==
Papers of OutRage! from 1990 through 1999 are held at Bishopsgate Institute Special Collections and Archives.

== See also ==
- Bash Back
- LGBT rights in the United Kingdom
- List of LGBT rights organisations
- Peter Tatchell Foundation
- GALHA LGBT Humanists

== Bibliography ==
- Lucas, Ian (1998). OutRage! : an oral history. London. ISBN 978-0-304-33358-5. OCLC 40461622.
