= List of LGBTQ rights organizations =

This is a list of LGBTQ rights organizations around the world. For social and support groups or organizations affiliated with mainstream religious organizations, please see List of LGBTQ-related organizations and conferences. For organizations affiliated with political parties, please see List of LGBTQ organizations that affiliate with political parties.

== International ==
- All Out
- GATE
- Gay and Lesbian International Sport Association (GLISA)
- Global Respect In Education (GRIN)
- Hivos
- Human Dignity Trust
- International Lesbian, Gay, Bisexual, Trans and Intersex Association (ILGA World)
- IGLYO
- International Lesbian, Gay, Bisexual, Transgender & Intersex Law Association (ILGLaw)
- International Lesbian Information Service (defunct)
- It Gets Better
- The Kaleidoscope Trust
- Organization Intersex International (OII)
- Outright International (formerly IGLHRC and OutRight Action International)

== Africa ==
=== Algeria ===
- Tranz Homos DZ

=== Angola ===
- Iris Angola Association

=== Egypt and Sudan ===
- Bedayaa

=== Kenya ===
- galck+ (previously called Gay and Lesbian Coalition of Kenya)

=== Libya ===
- Sawt

=== Morocco ===
- Kif-Kif (organization)

=== Mozambique ===
- Lambda

=== Nigeria ===
- Bisi Alimi Foundation
- The Initiative For Equal Rights
- Initiative for Sexual Reproductive Health and Rights Awareness (ISRHRA)
- Women's Health and Equal Rights Initiative

=== South Africa ===
- GALA – Queer Archive
- Intersex South Africa
- Gender Links
- SistaazHood
- Triangle Project

=== Tunisia ===
- Chouf Minorities
- Mawjoudin
- Shams

=== Uganda ===
- Freedom & Roam Uganda
- Sexual Minorities Uganda (SMUG) (shut down)
- Support Initiative for People with Congenital Disorders (SIPD)

=== West African Region ===
- Initiative Sankofa d'Afrique de l'Ouest (ISDAO)
- Queer African Youth Network (QAYN)

=== Zimbabwe ===
- Gays and Lesbians of Zimbabwe (GALZ)

== Asia ==
- Asian Lesbian Network
- Intersex Asia

=== Bangladesh ===
- Boys of Bangladesh

=== China ===
- Oii-Chinese
- DiversityUNNC - Ningbo

=== India ===
- Against Ignorance
- Humsafar Trust
- Naz Foundation (India) Trust
- Nazariya
- Orinam
- Queerala
- Sangama (human rights group)
- Sappho for Equality
- Srishti Madurai
- Tweet Foundation
- Udaan Trust

=== Indonesia ===
- Suara Kita
- GAYa Nusantara

=== Iran ===
- Iranian Queer Organization (based in Canada)
- Iranian Railroad for Queer Refugees (based in Canada)

=== Iraq ===
- IraQueer
- Rasan

=== Israel ===
- Aswat — a feminist queer group for Palestinian women based in Haifa
- Hoshen - Education and Change
- The Aguda - The Association for LGBTQ Equality in Israel
- Israel Gay Youth (IGY)
- Jerusalem Open House
- Tehila

=== Japan ===
- OCCUR
- Marriage For All Japan
- Students4Pride

=== Lebanon ===
- Helem
- Meem

=== Nepal ===
- Blue Diamond Society
- Sudur Paschim Samaj
- Federation of Sexual and Gender Minorities Nepal

=== Mongolia ===
- LGBT Centre Mongolia

=== Palestine ===
- Al Qaws—LGBTQ rights organization based in East Jerusalem
- Aswat

=== Philippines ===
- Ladlad

=== South Korea ===
- Solidarity for LGBT Human Rights of Korea

=== Singapore ===
- Pink Dot SG
- Oogachaga
- Young Out Here

=== Sri Lanka ===
- Equal Ground

=== Taiwan ===
- Taiwan Alliance to Promote Civil Partnership Rights (TAPCPR)
- Taiwan Tongzhi Hotline Association (TTHA)

== Australia and Oceania ==
=== Australia ===
- Androgen Insensitivity Syndrome Support Group Australia (AISSGA)
- Australian Queer Archives (AQuA)
- Australian Marriage Equality (AME)
- Campaign Against Moral Persecution (CAMP)
- Coalition of Activist Lesbians Australia (COAL)
- Community Action Against Homophobia (CAAH)
- Gay and Lesbian Teachers and Students Association (GaLTaS)
- Kaleidoscope Australia Human Rights Foundation (KAHRF)
- National LGBTI Health Alliance
- Organisation Intersex International Australia (OII Australia)
- South Australian Rainbow Advocacy Alliance (SARAA)
- Safe Schools Coalition Australia (SSCA)
- Transgender Victoria (TGV)
- Victorian Pride Lobby
- Zoe Belle Gender Centre (ZBGC)

=== New Zealand ===
- Dorian Society
- GayNZ.com
- Intersex Aotearoa (ITANZ)
- Rainbow Youth

== Europe ==
- European Parliament Intergroup on LGBT Rights
- ILGA-Europe
- LGBT Network
- OII Europe
- Transgender Europe (TGEU)

=== Armenia ===
- Pink Armenia
- Right Side NGO

=== Austria ===
- HOSI Wein

=== Belarus ===
- LGBT Human Rights Project "GayBelarus"

=== Bosnia and Herzegovina ===
- Sarajevo Open Centre (Sarajevski otvoreni centar)

=== Bulgaria ===
- BGO Gemini

=== Croatia ===
- Zagreb Pride
- Proces

=== Cyprus ===
- Cypriot Gay Liberation Movement

=== Denmark ===
- LGBT Danmark
- Copenhagen Pride
- Lambda
- Sabaah

=== Estonia ===
- Geikristlaste Kogu

=== Faroe Islands ===
- Friðarbogin

=== Finland ===
- Pink Rose
- Seta - LGBTI Rights in Finland

=== France ===
- Act Up
- Arcadie
- Association des Gays et Lesbiennes Arméniens de France
- Homosexualités et Socialisme
- Inter-LGBT
- SOS Homophobie
- Beit Haverim
- Bi'Cause

=== Georgia ===
- Identoba

=== Germany ===
- LSVD^{+} – Federation Queer Diversity (LSVD^{+})
- Quarteera

=== Greece ===
- Colour Youth

=== Greenland ===
- LGBT Qaamaneq

=== Hungary ===
- Háttér Society
- Hungarian LGBT Alliance
- Labrisz Lesbian Association

=== Iceland ===
- Samtökin '78
- Trans Ísland

=== Ireland ===
- Campaign for Homosexual Law Reform
- LGBT Ireland
- Gay Doctors Ireland
- National LGBT Federation
- Union of Students in Ireland

=== Italy ===
- Arcigay
- Circle of Homosexual Culture Mario Mieli

=== Lithuania ===
- Lithuanian Gay League

=== Malta ===
- MGRM (formerly known as Malta Gay Rights Movement)

=== Moldova ===
- GenderDoc-M

=== Montenegro ===
- Queer Montenegro

=== The Netherlands ===
- COC Nederland

=== Norway ===
- Norwegian National Association for Lesbian and Gay Liberation (LLH)

=== Poland ===
- Campaign Against Homophobia (KPH)
- Lambda Warszawa
- Stop Bzdurom

=== Romania ===
- Accept
- Be An Angel

=== Russia ===
- Children-404: a Russian public internet project which supports homosexual, bisexual and transgender teenagers in Russia. 404 alludes to the internet error message "Error 404 - Page not found" and refers to the ignoring of the existence of LGBT teenagers by Russian society and establishment.
- LGBT Human Rights Project Gayrussia.ru
- Russian LGBT network

=== Serbia ===
- Gay Lesbian Info Centre
- Belgrade Pride

=== Spain ===
- Federación Estatal de Lesbianas, Gays, Transexuales y Bisexuales

=== Sweden ===
- HomO, The Ombudsman against Discrimination on Grounds of Sexual Orientation (government office)
- Swedish Federation for Lesbian, Gay, Bisexual and Transgender Rights (RFSL)

=== Turkey ===
- KAOS GL
- Lambdaistanbul
- LEGATO, LGBT group of university students and academics with nationwide organization
- SPoD

=== United Kingdom ===
- Black Gay Men's Advisory Group
- Cara-Friend (Northern Ireland)
- Campaign for Homosexual Equality
- Educational Action Challenging Homophobia
- Equality Network (Scotland)
- Intersex UK
- The Kaleidoscope Trust
- LGBT Foundation (formerly Lesbian and Gay Foundation)
- LGBT Humanists UK
- LGBT Network (Scotland)
- LGBT Youth Scotland
- Mermaids Gender
- Outright Scotland (formerly the Scottish Minorities Group)
- Peter Tatchell Foundation
- Racing Pride
- Stonewall

== North America ==
- United Caribbean Trans Network

=== Bahamas ===
- Rainbow Alliance of The Bahamas

=== Belize ===
- United Belize Advocacy Movement

=== Canada ===
==== National ====
- Canadian Centre for Diversity and Inclusion
- Community One Foundation
- Egale Canada
- Iranian Railroad for Queer Refugees
- Iranian Queer Organization
- Lambda Foundation
- PFLAG Canada
- ProudPolitics
- Rainbow Railroad

==== British Columbia ====
- Qmunity (Vancouver, British Columbia)

==== Ontario ====
- Supporting Our Youth

=== Jamaica ===
- Jamaica Forum for Lesbians, All-sexuals, and Gays (JFLAG)

== South America ==
=== Brazil ===
- Aliança Nacional LGBTI
- Associação Brasileira de Lésbicas, Gays, Bissexuais, Travestis, Transexuais e Intersexos
- Associação Nacional de Travestis e Transexuais
- Grupo Dignidade
- Grupo Gay da Bahia
- Minha Criança Trans

=== Chile ===
- Movimiento de Integración y Liberación Homosexual (MOVILH)

=== Colombia ===
- Colombia Diversa

=== Ecuador ===
- Fundación Ecuatoriana Equidad

=== Guyana ===
- Society Against Sexual Orientation Discrimination (SASOD)

== See also ==
- Gay community
- LGBTQ rights by country or territory
- List of intersex organizations
- List of transgender-rights organizations
