= Eliane Morissens =

Belgian teacher and activist (1927–2006)

- Morissens in the Netherlands in 1982
- Born: Eliane Willie Fernande Morissens; 10 August 1927; Etterbeek, Belgium
- Died: 9 December 2006 (aged 79); La Garde, France
- Occupations: Teacher, activist
- Years active: 1957–1988
- Known for: Challenging discriminatory employment policies against LGBT workers

Eliane Morissens (10 August 1927 – 9 December 2006) was a Belgian teacher and activist. Raised as a feminist, she was active as a trade unionist and socialist. Morissens studied to become a chemical engineer, but was employed as a teacher, as there were few other options for women in her era. She worked her way up to assistant headmistress of a provincial technical college but in 1977 was denied a promotion to become the head of the school. When asked in 1980 to appear on a television broadcast about lesbians, she decided to participate. During the broadcast, she stated that she had been denied the promotion because of her lesbianism. She commented on the irony of the school board being unwilling to put a lesbian in charge of girl students, but having no concern about appointing a man for the post.

Morissens was terminated from her job without pay two days after the broadcast. The school board denied that the decision was based on her sexuality. The board claimed their decision was rooted in professional misconduct, since she had questioned their authority on the television program. She asked for a review of the case by the provincial appeals committee, which upheld the decision in 1982, but allowed her limited compensation under early retirement. She then appealed to the Council of State, the highest court in the country. In 1984, the court upheld her termination and denied that her freedom of expression had been violated. Her plight became a cause célèbre in the LGBT community throughout Europe and the Americas, garnering international press coverage and demonstrations. The international LGBT community raised funds for her personal use and legal fees, campaigned for her reinstatement, lobbied legislators and teachers' unions, and continued with protests on her behalf.

Embarrassed by the international attention, the Flemish Socialist Party introduced a measure in 1982, which passed in 1985, to repeal article 372bis of the Belgian Penal Code, which set a higher age of consent for homosexual relations. That year, Morissens filed an appeal with the European Court of Human Rights in Strasbourg, France. In 1988, the court dismissed her appeal, but acknowledged her freedom of expression was abridged; however, they found the curtailment justifiable because as a teacher she was required to maintain a professional demeanor. The European Union adopted legislation in 2000, to prohibit employment discrimination on the basis of sexual orientation following recommendations by the Legal Affairs Committee of the European Parliament, which had reviewed legal challenges of discrimination including Morissens's case. She died in southern France in 2006 and is remembered for bringing the issue of employment discrimination against homosexuals to worldwide attention.

== Early life and education ==
Eliane Willie Fernande Morissens was born on 10 August 1927 in Etterbeek, Belgium. From a young age, Morissens knew she was a lesbian and it was not an issue with her parents. They counseled her to be independent and did not pressure her to marry. Her mother was a feminist and Morissens later said that for herself if you were a lesbian, you were a feminist. She studied to be a chemical engineer, but chose to be a teacher as it was one of the few career paths open to women. She was involved in trade union organizing and in the early 1950s joined the Socialist Party of Wallonia. Because neither the trade unions nor the socialists involved women in positions of power, she pressed both organizations to allow women's inclusion in administrative and leadership positions. Morissens was active in the struggle against police and security service repression. There were no support groups for homosexuals in Wallonia and only a few in Flanders, but she did meet LGBT activists with whom she was open about her sexuality.

== Career ==
=== Teaching ===
In 1957, Morissens began teaching chemistry at the provincial technical college in Saint-Ghislain, a village in the province of Hainaut in the Wallonia region of Belgium. She did not disclose her lesbianism to her employer, and because of the conservative environment and predominance of Catholicism in the country, she typically hid her sexuality from her colleagues and her students. Morissens had a vacation home in the south of France. She said that she could only truly be herself for four months of the year when she was there. She actively picketed in the 1960 general strike in Wallonia, although most women provided only support services, bringing refreshments for the participants. The student protests in 1968 gave rise to a new generation of feminists with whom she began interacting. During the course of her career, she received several promotions, eventually becoming the assistant headmistress at the school. In 1977, she applied to become the college's headmistress and was denied the promotion. Though the reason was not explicitly stated, non-public information led Morissens to conclude that it was because a lesbian could not be in charge of a girls' school which had over 1,000 girls and 200 boys.

=== Conflict with the school board ===
In 1980, Morissens was approached by a women's group from Brussels and asked to appear on a television program discussing homosexuality. Morissens said she agreed because she was tired of hiding, wanted to help her students, and sought to be open about her involvement in LGBT activism. In weighing her decision, she thought that her long and exemplary tenure, her age (53), and speaking anonymously would shield her from any serious repercussions. On 28 October 1980, she participated in a lesbian panel discussion, "Fragments de bonheur" (Fragments of Happiness), aired on RTB-Liège without giving her name, or identifying her school. In the discussion, Morissens stated that she had been denied a promotion because she was a lesbian. She also questioned why her sexuality would pose any more of a risk to the female students than a male teacher's sexuality. (Note: The Council of Europe Staff reported the quote as, "I was expecting to take up the post of head teacher in a very large school of 1,000 girls and 200 boys. Then people said, though unfortunately this was never stated in writing, that it was unthinkable that a homosexual woman should be put in charge of a school with 1,000 girls. I find that rather amusing! There are at present two men in charge of the school; I dont know whether that doesn't make the risk all the greater…" while the 1982 ILGA-bulletin reported the quote as "I was preparing to become responsible for a very large school that was attended by 1,000 girls and 200 boys. It was said – but unfortunately not put into writing – that it was unthinkable that a homosexual woman should be the Head of a school attended by girls – that's funny! At present, the school is run by two men; I don't know if the danger is not even greater…".) She was placed on leave two days after the broadcast and on 8 November suspended without pay from her job by the Députation Permanente du Hainaut, the school board of the province.

The school board claimed that Morissens's sexuality had nothing to do with her firing, rather it was because she had challenged her employer's authority over a promotion decision. They specified that as a civil servant, her dismissal was acceptable because her criticisms of her superiors were unjustified and transferred her case to the local government council to appoint a review committee. Lesbians in Belgium began campaigning for her reinstatement. When she asked the Socialist Party, which had the majority on the local council, for their support, she was told by the party leadership that personally she had a right to express herself, but as a teacher she was legally required to be discreet. Both the party and the trade unions refused to support her, although later the trade union changed its position.

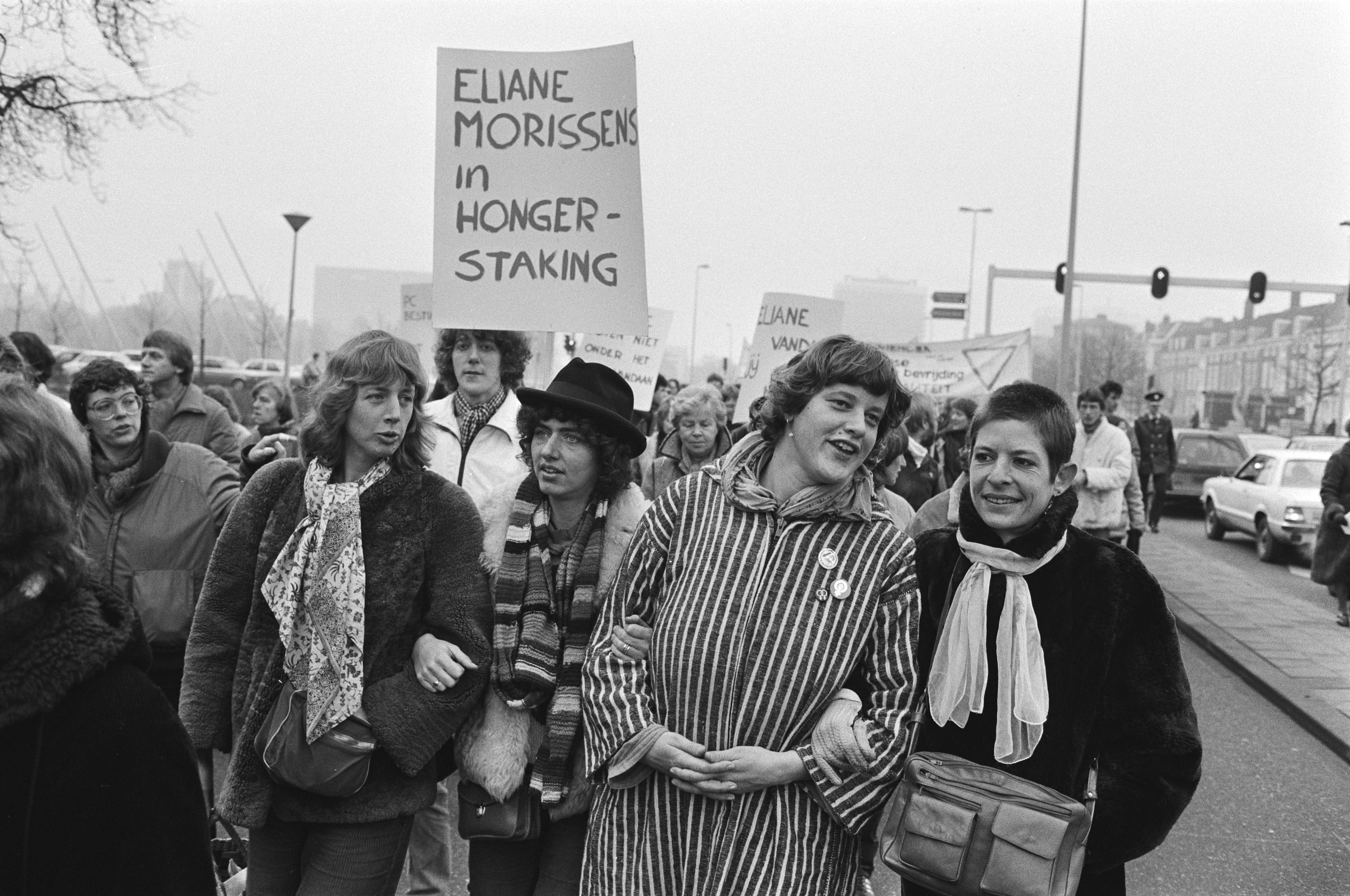
1982 protest march held near the Belgian Embassy in The Hague in support of Morissens

After fifteen months with no decision, Morissens began a hunger strike in January 1982. She ended it thirty-eight days later when her health began to fail. Her hunger strike resulted in more than two thousand letters of support being sent from as far away as Japan. Members of the British and European Parliaments wrote to the Belgian premier to pressure a settlement of her case. The provincial appeals committee accepted the statement by the school board that her homosexuality was not a reason for her termination and upheld their decision. They allowed Morissens to collect her salary, BEF 57,000 per month (approximately US$1,800) for two years, but thereafter drastically reduced her pension allowance to BEF 20,000 per month (approximately US$400) based upon the scale for early retirement. (Note: Conversion based upon historical monetary rates for 1980 and 1982 as reported by Laurent Pelé at FXTOP of Sartrouville, France.)

=== Council of State appeal ===
In protest of her firing and the compensation plan, Morissens asked for the case to be reviewed by the Council of State, the highest court in the country. Her appeal asked that they review the harshness of the penalty and charges of professional misconduct, as well as whether the decision was a violation of the European Convention on Human Rights, which guaranteed her freedom of expression. She challenged the notion that she did not have the right to criticize her employer, as her right to do so under the convention was only restricted if her statement posed a risk to state security or violated someone else's rights. She also noted that her statement about the equal risk she and male teachers might pose to female students was said to point out the discrimination in the hiring practice to people on the panel who would understand her situation. The school countered her challenge noting that her statement called into question the reputation of the male teachers at the school and violated the provincial law that teachers maintain professional conduct in all circumstances. They further noted that she was free to express herself provided she did not violate the principles required for civil servants in maintaining societal order and discipline.

Morissens began speaking about homosexual rights at both local community meetings and abroad. The case prompted protests, articles, and fundraising events throughout Europe and the Americas. The case was brought to the attention of the International Women's Day conference held in Amsterdam in 1982, and Morissens was invited to speak. It was covered in the French magazine Gai pied, which set up a support network to organize demonstrations and launched a petition drive. The magazine covered the case as it made its way through the court system and urged subscribers and members of the International Gay Association (IGA) to pressure the Council of Europe to renounce discrimination against homosexuals. Eva Isaksson, a Finnish activist who produced the Lesbian Information Secretariat Newsletter for the International Lesbian Information Service (ILIS) published information on ILIS's letter-writing campaigns, fund-raisers for Morissens's legal and personal expenses, and solidarity demonstrations. ILIS organized public protests in Belgium, Britain, Finland, France, Norway, and Spain. Both ILIS and IGA lobbied European teachers' unions in support of Morissens.

Morissens's fight had raised international awareness about employment discrimination and job security for homosexuals, and caused a public outcry in Belgium. Embarrassed by the treatment she had received from Wallonia's socialist party, in June 1982 the Flemish Socialist Party introduced a measure to repeal article 372bis of the Belgian Penal Code. This article had been inserted into a child protection bill passed in the 1960s to prevent minors from being seduced by homosexuals. It set the age of consent for homosexuals at eighteen, two years higher than that imposed for heterosexual relations. In October 1984, the Council of State upheld Morissens's termination, noting that their authority could not replace that of the local authorities unless the penalty imposed was excessive in relation to the facts of the case. (Note: "Considérant qu'il n'appartient pas au Conseil d'Etat de substituer son pouvoir d'appréciation, quant à la gravité de la peine infligée, à celui de l'autorité compétente pour prononcer cette sanction, sinon dans le cas où raisonnablement il devrait être admis que la peine prononcée serait hors de toute proportion avec les faits reprochés". ["Considering that it is not for the Council of State to substitute its discretion, as to the seriousness of the sentence imposed, for that of the competent authority to impose this sanction, except in the case where reasonably it should be admitted that the sentence imposed would be out of all proportion to the facts charged".) Their ruling, according to a report published in The Body Politic in March 1985, found that during the 1980 broadcast when panelists were discussing whether gay teachers posed a danger to students, Morissens had noted that no one discusses danger when male teachers lead all female classes. The magazine reported "it was this statement, seen as insulting to the school board, in addition to Morissens's coming out as a lesbian, that led to her dismissal". The Council of State ruled that Morissens had not proved her allegation that her sexuality cost her the promotion. They also found that while civil servants could make reasonable criticism of their superiors, they were forbidden from making attacks upon their reputations or undermining public confidence. In the wake of the ruling, in June 1985 article 372bis of the penal code was repealed.

=== Court of Human Rights appeal ===
After the ruling, Morissens filed an appeal with the European Court of Human Rights in Strasbourg, France. They examined the case on 3 May 1988. Although they found that the actions of the school board had violated her freedom of expression under Article 10 of the Convention on Human Rights, the court held that it was a justifiable interference because the right is conditional based upon other laws and provisions for protecting the public. Their analysis noted that staff regulations of the province provided rules under which staff could be disciplined and that she had access to those regulations; that the right to free expression was curtailed if it breached the rights of others; and that the duties and responsibilities of expressing herself required her as a teacher to accept restrictions to her right to free expression to avoid undermining public confidence. The court dismissed her appeal basing their decision on the fact that her dismissal to protect her employer and colleagues was a reasonable restriction on her freedom of expression. The LGBT community was disappointed in the outcome because the court had refused to recognize or examine the discrimination their community faced in employment and had narrowly focused on free expression and its limits. However, the rise of the AIDS epidemic in the late 1980s, shifted many activists away from political issues because they feared stigmatization by what was perceived as a "gay disease".

== Death and legacy ==
Morissens died on 9 December 2006 in La Garde, Var, France. She is remembered for her activism and raising international awareness about employment discrimination against homosexuals. Her case also served as a catalyst for changing the laws regarding discrimination on the basis of sexuality in Belgium, though comprehensive anti-discrimination legislation in the country would not be achieved until 2003. The case was also part of the evidence in a report on employment discrimination faced by the LGBT community which was deliberated by the Legal Affairs Committee of the European Parliament in 1984. The conclusion of the Legal Affairs Committee was that avenues available to eliminate discrimination were drafting of new legislation or extensions of existing laws to redefine prohibitions of discrimination on the grounds of sex to include homosexuals. The committee recommended that the European Community had a social obligation to ensure that homosexuals did not face discrimination in their workplaces and that there was a valid legal basis to protect the rights and freedoms of the LGBT community under the Convention on Human Rights. Directive 2000/78/EC was finally adopted by the European Union prohibiting employment discrimination on the basis of sexual orientation (or age, beliefs, or disability) in 2000.
