= Ian Purcell =

Australian LGBTIQA+ activist

Ian Purcell AM (21 December 1947 – 6 November 2016) was an Australian gay activist and Member of the Order of Australia, known as the "godfather of the gay community" in South Australia.

== Personal life ==
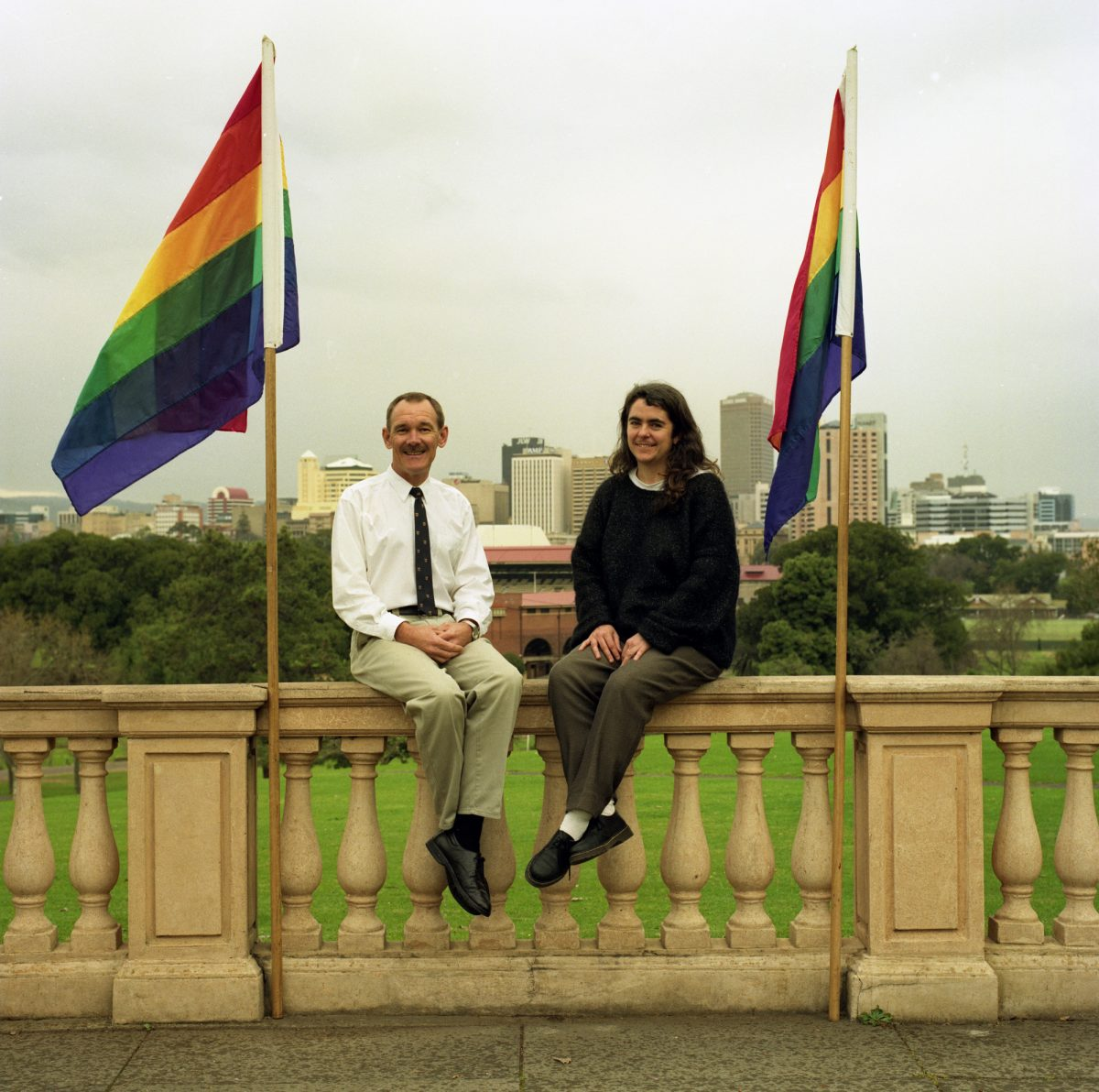
Ian Purcell with Barb Baird

Purcell was born on 21 December 1947 in Unley, South Australia. He worked as an English teacher until 1986 during the AIDS epidemic he decided to join the AIDS council and begin advocacy for the LGBTIQA+ community. Purcell met his husband Stephen Leahy while working as the manager of the Darling House Community Library. The pair married in 2006 in Montreal, Canada before same-sex marriage was legalised in Australia.

Purcell died on 6 November 2016, aged 68.

== Activism ==
Ian Purcell became known as activist and LGBTIQA+ leader in South Australia, and was described as the "godfather of the gay community".

He was a founding member of the Lesbian and Gay Community Action lobby group, the South Australian Rainbow Advocacy Alliance, the Adelaide Pride March and the Uranian Society, a cultural group for gay men. He involved in the Let's Get Equal campaign for marriage equality and was chairperson of the AIDS Council of South Australia. He was awarded a Member of the Order of Australia in 2005 for "service to the community, particularly gay and lesbian people through advocacy, education, law reform and support for community events".

Purcell was the posthumous inaugural inductee to the SA Pride Hall of Fame in 2024.
