= Revenge (nightclub) =

LGBT nightclub in Brighton, England

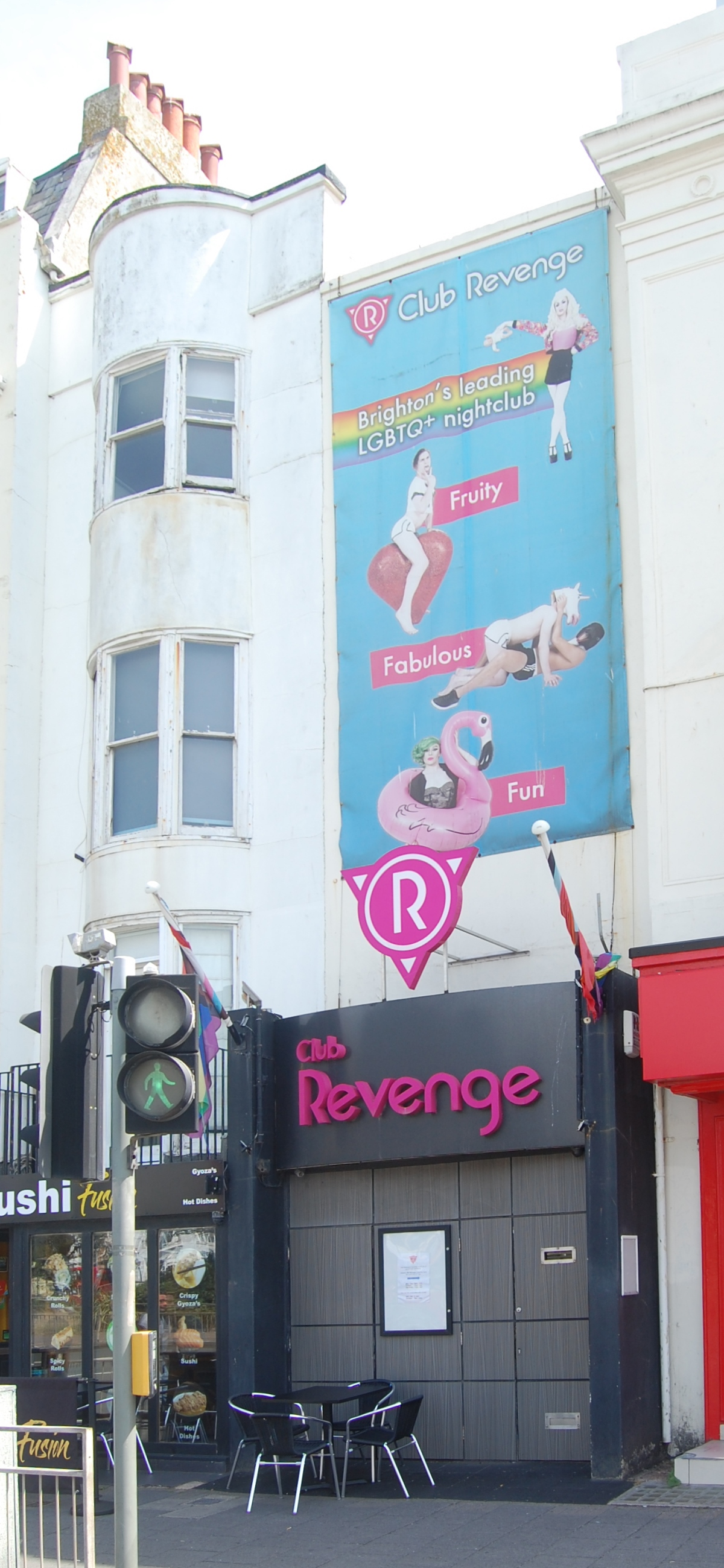
- The entrance to Revenge in 2020

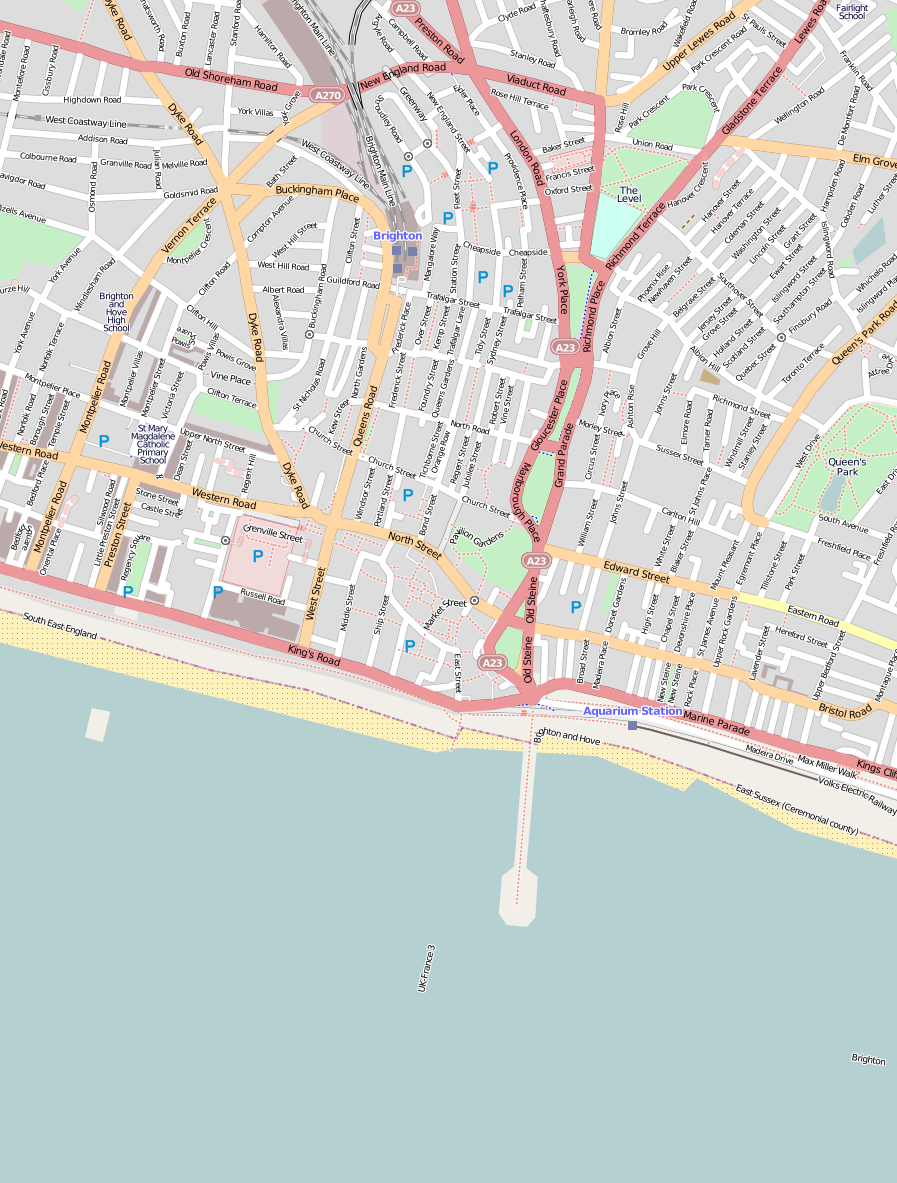
- Location within Brighton
- Address: 32-34 Old Steine; Brighton; United Kingdom
- Coordinates: 50.8201252°N 0.1365798°W
- Type: Nightclub
- Capacity: 500

Construction
- Opened: 1991

Website
- www.revenge.co.uk

Revenge is an LGBT nightclub in Brighton, England. The venue was the first sizable dedicated gay club to open in the city, which is now known for its gay community and is recognised as the "unofficial gay capital of the UK".

== History ==
The club was opened in 1991 by Tony Chapman as Brighton's first sizable dedicated gay club after spending £300,000 renovating Savannah. In 1996, the venue saw a total redesign featuring new lighting and a cutting edge cooling system within the walls. In 2004, Chapman sold the venue to leisure company Stagfleet Ltd for £1.5 million.

The club has hosted celebrity guests, including contestants from the television series RuPaul's Drag Race.

== See also ==
- LGBT community of Brighton and Hove
- List of electronic dance music venues
