= Allsorts Youth Project =

LGBT youth organisations based in the UK

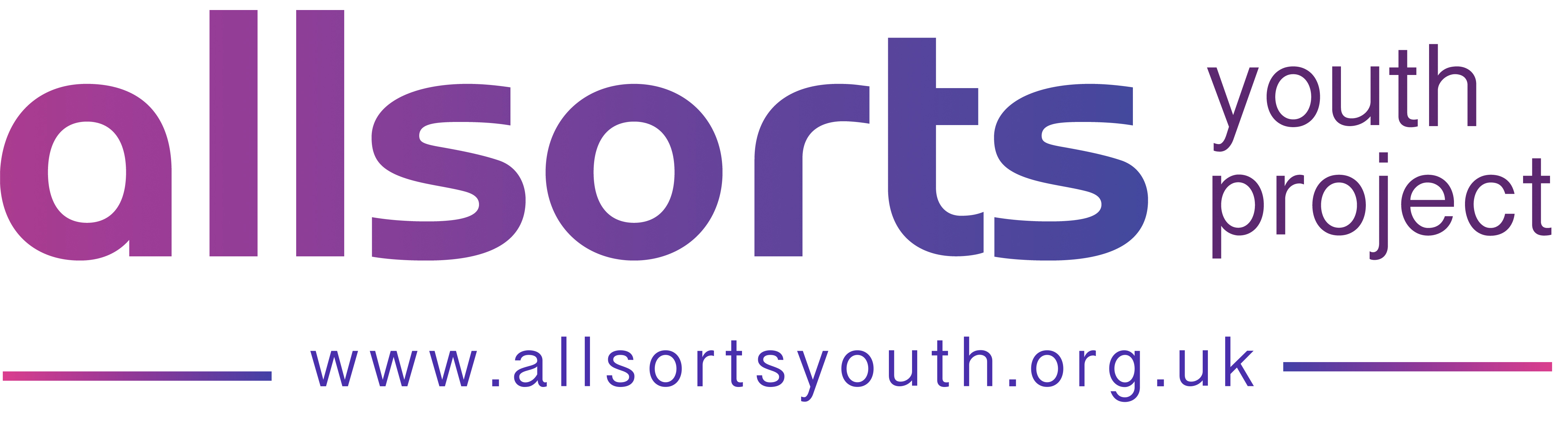
- Founded: 1 October 1999
- Founders: Jess Wood; James Newton
- Type: LGBT youth charity
- Registration no.: 1123014
- Purpose: LGBT youth
- Location: Young People’s Centre, 69 Ship St, Brighton, East Sussex, BN1 1AE, UK
- Origins: LGBT rights in the United Kingdom
- Region served: East Sussex West Sussex Brighton & Hove
- Members: 200
- Key people: Jess Wood
- Revenue: £170,300
- Employees: 10
- Volunteers: 50
- Website: www.allsortsyouth.org.uk

Allsorts Youth Project is an LGBT youth charity in East Sussex. Founded in 1999 by Jess Wood and James Newton, the project aims to meet the needs of lesbian, gay, bisexual, trans* and unsure youth in Brighton and Hove and the wider East Sussex area.

== History ==
Since 1999 the project has expanded to meet the develop needs of LGBTU youth. Allsorts has developed to offer 1-2-1 support via a range of mediums, a weekly central drop-in for 16-25 youth and many satellite groups. The project has been funded through various organisations and grants to expand from LGB support to include trans and gender questioning young people.

== Mission ==
Allsorts works to raise awareness, promote good practice and facilitate the creation of safer and more supportive environments for LGBT young people in the wider community.

== Services ==
Some of the main services Allsorts provide include

=== Support Groups ===
Allsorts have a number of satellite groups that support their main drop-in:

- A young men's group: Male Matters
- A young women's group: No Dress Code
- A Bi/pan/queer/poly/omni group: Bi Brighton
- A trans group: Transformers
- A wellbeing group: A-Sorted

Allsorts recently expanded the capacity of their trans* and gender questioning young people's group 'Transformers' with funding from the Rainbow Fund

=== Peer education ===
Allsorts Youth Projects runs a 'peer education' programme which involves trained workers alongside young people at the project facilitating workshops in schools, colleges and youth projects. Started in 2005, the programme, the workshops explore the impact of homo/bi/trans-phobic language on young people. The programme has been identified as good practice by Stonewall. Brighton & Hove council acknowledged the large collaborative role Allsort Peer Education has played in the city council being named to in the country in Stonewall's Education Equality Index.

=== Resources ===
Allsorts have produced numerous resources, including a mental health support and resource booklet for LGBT Youth called 'Healthy Heads and Hearts'. An anthology of writings by LGB youth called 'Deep Blue Sea'. They have also produced resources on Gay/Bi/Trans men's sexual health and HIV awareness, and a leaflet on 'Sex, Love & Coming Out'

== Campaigns ==
Young People's Voice is the youth campaigning and engagement project at Allsorts for LGBT Youth. They have done annual campaigns for IDAHOBIT (International Day Against Homo/BI/Trans-phobia). For IDAHOBIT the group presented their 'Global Voices' campaign at Brighton's Old Stiene. On 5 February 2013, they launched the first annual LGBT Children, Young People and Families Day with: a Tea Party for CVS groups, practitioners, an LGBT + Allies Youth Prom and a Champions Dinners to showcase the project. The Day was covered by ITV Meridian news, with a feature article and interview on their website. The Day was supported by Mental Health Promotion, Rainbow Fund, Moshi Moshi, Hotel du Vin and Hilton Metropole.

== Funding ==
Allsorts have been funded by numerous large organisations over the years. Including Children in Need which highlighted the work they do in a video interview. For 2012-2013 are one Brighton & Hove Mayor's chosen charities to support alongside The Marlets Hospice and Brighton Women's Centre

== Awards ==
The project is led by the Project Director Jess Wood who in 2012 was awarded an MBE for her services for working with young LGBT people through the charity. Their volunteering group Young People's Voice won best regional volunteering group team for the South East from vInspired for their Peer Educators programme. They also received the 'Working Together' award from the Brighton and Hove Council LGBT Workers Forum as part of their History Awards 2012 for their work in schools with Peer Education.

== See also ==
- Children in Need
- Equality Network
- LGBT Network
