= Pride Scotia =

Annual LGBT event in Scotland

Pride Scotia was Scotland's national community-based LGBT Pride festival alternating between the cities of Edinburgh and Glasgow, held in June from its beginnings in 1995 until 2008, when it split into separate organisations.

Between 1995 and 2002, the pride marches were organised by Pride Scotland Limited, until it went bust in December 2002 with debts of around £60,000. A new organisation, AL D ltd was founded in 2003 to continue the tradition of the annual march and festival. This organisation changed its name to Pride Scotia (Edinburgh) in 2004 and a separate organisation Pride Scotia (Glasgow) was created with the two organisations organising Pride Scotia in their respective cities in alternate years thereafter. Pride Scotia Edinburgh is a company limited by guarantee whilst Pride Glasgow is now a Scottish Charitable Incorporated Organisation. In 2008, the Glasgow arm of the organisation announced it was splitting completely, and has since used the name Pride Glasgow.

== History ==
The precursor event to Pride Scotia was called Lark in the Park. It was organised by the Scottish Homosexual Rights Group and first held in 1988 Edinburgh’s Princes Street gardens and again in 1989 and 1992.

In 1991 there was a Scottish Pride event held in Edinburgh on 22 June. It started with a picnic on Calton Hill followed by a march, along the pavement, from Waterloo Place to the bottom of the Mound at the National Gallery.

In 1994, Laura Norris and Duncan Hothersall, both members of the University of Edinburgh LGBT society "BLOGS", decided to organise a Pride Parade to take place in the city of Edinburgh.

=== Pride 1995 ===
The first Pride Scotia march in Scotland gathered on Barony Street in Edinburgh on 17 June. Police estimated that around 3000 people attended. The route followed was Broughton Street, Leith Street, Princes Street, the Mound, George IV Bridge, and down Middle Meadow Walk into the Meadows. The first Pride Festival on the Meadows began as the procession arrived, and had a stage and surrounding stalls. It continued regardless of the rain, finishing as scheduled at 9pm. The cleanup took almost the entire Sunday and around 20 volunteers.

=== Pride 1996 ===
The second Pride march in Scotland was held in Glasgow on 22 June, finishing with a festival on Glasgow Green. Guests included Quentin Crisp.

=== Pride 1997 ===
The third Pride march in Scotland was held in Edinburgh, with the festival again on the Meadows on 21 June. This year was the first year to include a minute's silence, followed by a minute's noise to mark the effects of AIDS and HIV on the LGBT communities in Scotland. The tradition has been repeated year by year since, led by the Sisters of Perpetual Indulgence.

Guest stars at the festival included Mary Kiani, Labi Siffre and Glasgow Gay Men's Chorus. The three Scottish women's drumming groups amalgamated for the festival: SheBoom from Glasgow, Commotion from Edinburgh and Elles Belles from Dundee.

=== Pride 1998 ===
On 13 June, the fourth march began in Blythswood Square and ended at Glasgow Green, where the festival took place. The Glasgow women's drumming group, SheBoom, led the march. The Pride Scotland banner for 1998 was carried by George Galloway, Tommy Sheridan, and Louise Fyfe.

Guest stars at the festival included Jimmy Somerville, Karen Dunbar, Carol Laula, Horse, Lorraine Jordan, Kate Copstick, and Huffty.

=== Pride 1999 ===
Keeping with tradition, this year's Pride was held in Edinburgh, on 19 June. Assembly in East London Street. In keeping with the two previous Edinburgh prides, the route followed was Broughton Street, Leith Street, Princes Street, the Mound, George IV Bridge, and down Middle Meadow Walk into the Meadows. The route passed the then-current home of the Scottish Parliament, and the headquarters of the Bank of Scotland, which had earlier that year been the scene of protests against the Pat Robertson deal. The lesbian drummer band Commotion, near the head of the procession, ceased playing in silent protest as the march passed the bank, and many marchers followed an informal call to "boo the bank".

The festival was held in the Meadows: the theme for this year's festival was Celebrate Diversity and included the introduction of the Diversity Area.

=== Pride 2000 ===
Pride was held in Glasgow much later than usual this year, on 2 September.

=== Pride 2001 ===
Pride held in Edinburgh on 23 June.

=== Pride 2002 ===
Pride held in Glasgow on 22 June. The march began in Blythswood Square and ended in Glasgow Green where rain helped to shrink numbers below financial viability for what was the first (and only) festival to have an admission charge.

Guest speakers at the festival on Glasgow Green included Tommy Sheridan, Dorothy Grace Elder, and Roseanne Foyer from the Scottish TUC.

=== Pride 2003 ===
This year, the march took place in Edinburgh on 19 July. Following the bankruptcy of Pride Scotland, this was the first year that Pride was organised by Pride Scotia. The festival was held in various locations along Leith Walk, including a sports day in Gayfield Square and a Health and Community Fair in Club eGo on Picardy Place.

=== Pride 2004 ===
This year, the march took place in Glasgow on 19 June. The festival was held in The Arches.

=== Pride 2005 ===
On 25 June, the march took place in Edinburgh, from East Market Street to Broughton Street. A Health and Community Fair was held in Club eGo on Picardy Place. Other associated events included an exhibition of AIDS/HIV commemoration quilts and a programme of LGBT films in the Filmhouse.

=== Pride 2006 ===
On 24 June, thousands took part in a march through Glasgow city centre ending in the festival at George Square. There was a small controversy with ten firemen refusing to hand out leaflets.

=== Pride 2007 ===
On 23 June, the march and festival took place in Edinburgh. Due to bad weather the march was rerouted at the last minute to bypass The Mound. The march ran from East Market Street, via Princes Street, St Andrew Square, and Broughton Street and concluded in Pilrig Park where a Tented Village included marquees for Community, Youth, Performance, Men, etc.

=== Pride 2008 ===
This year, when Pride was to be held in Glasgow, the organisers announced they would be splitting from Pride Scotia, forming their own organisation, which they called Pride Glasgow. Pride Scotia would still continue to run in Edinburgh every 2 years as it has done previously. The re-launched festival was held on 30 August 2008 and was attended by approx 5000 people, and involved a march from Blythswood Square to George Square with a rally and speeches from Nicola Sturgeon deputy first minister, Irfan Rabbani Glasgow City Council Equalities spokesperson Bruce Fraser Chief Executive of Gay Men's Health and Patrick Harvie MSP and leader of the Scottish Green Party.

=== Pride 2010 ===
This was the first year Pride was held in both Glasgow and Edinburgh. The Edinburgh arm was held on 26 June, and the Glasgow arm on 17 July.

=== Pride 2015 ===
Pride 2015 was held in Glasgow Green. There was a main stage which featured performances from Heather Peace, George Bowie, Union J and Katrina and the Waves.

=== Pride 2017 ===
Pride 2017 was held on 19 and 20 August 2017 at Glasgow Green. The annual parade took place on Saturday 19 August 2017 from Glasgow Green at 12pm. This was the last Pride Parade under the name Pride Scotia. From 2019 onwards, the parade has been known as Edinburgh Pride.

== Pride Awards ==
The Pride Awards acknowledge the people and the work accomplished in Scotland over the previous twelve months, in the name of promoting equality, tolerance and respect, and have been presented at the annual Pride festival each year since 1998.

There are six award categories:

1. Activism
2. Art & Entertainment
3. Culture
4. 'Friend for Life'
5. Health
6. Pride Scotia

=== Ian Dunn Memorial Award for Activism ===
In January 2007, it emerged that Ian Dunn, after whom the Ian Dunn Memorial Award was named, had been a founder member of the banned paedophile activist group, PIE in 1974. After learning of this, lesbian Scottish Liberal Democrats politician Margaret Smith threatened to return her 2004 award unless it was renamed. Bisexual Scottish Greens MSP Patrick Harvie, the 2003 recipient of the award, also suggested it should be renamed. The Ian Dunn Memorial Award is no longer listed on the official website of the Terrence Higgins Trust Scotland, which until 2007 had been responsible for managing the award.

- 1998: Tim Hopkins, Equality Network
- 1999: Magie Meager, Equal Opportunities Officer for West Dunbartonshire Council
- 2000: Scrap the Section Campaign
- 2001: Mags Mackie
- 2002: Ali Jarvis
- 2003: Patrick Harvie MSP
- 2004: Margaret Smith MSP
- 2005: Ailsa Spindler - Equality Network
- 2006: The Granite Sisters, Aberdeen

=== Award for Art and Entertainment ===
The winner of this award was nominated by The List.

- 1998: Lorenzo Mele MCT Theatre Co.
- 1999: Horse - Singer and Songwriter
- 2000: Glasgay!
- 2001: OOT, hosted by Craig Hill at The Stand Comedy Club
- 2002: Glasgow Film Theatre
- 2003: David Leddy
- 2004: Burly
- 2005: Steven Thomson, Glasgay! Producer
- 2006: Ellen Galford and Brian Thompson, organisers of the Rainbow City Exhibition at the City Art Centre in Edinburgh

=== Jackie Forster Memorial Award for Culture ===
The winner of this award was nominated by Glasgow Women's Library. The award is meant to be a memorial to Jackie Forster.

- 1998: Glasgow Women's Library
- 1999: Lesbian Archive and Information Centre
- 2000: Laura Norris
- 2001: BiGLes Youth
- 2002: The List
- 2003: Edwin Morgan
- 2004: Lucinda Broadbent
- 2005: OurStory Scotland / Remember When
- 2006: Rachel Jury

=== The "Friend for Life" Award ===
The winner of this award was nominated by the Equality Network, to someone outside the LGBT community who has worked for LGBT rights in Scotland.

- 1999: Rab McNeil (The Scotsman), for his outstanding work on the Pat Robertson story.
- 2000: Nora Radcliffe MSP
- 2001: Rt. Rev. Richard Holloway
- 2002: Chief Insp. Gavin Buist of Lothian and Borders Police
- 2003: Helena Scott (Age Concern Scotland)
- 2004: Very Rev. Prof. Iain Torrance
- 2005: Pauline McNeill MSP
- 2006: Paul Parr, Deputy Registrar General at the General Register Office, Edinburgh

=== Award for Health ===
The winner of this award was nominated by PHACE Scotland.

- 1998: Reach Out Highland
- 1999: Steve Retson Project
- 2000: Stonewall Youth
- 2001: Sappho – Lesbian Health Service
- 2002: Parents Enquiry Scotland
- 2003: Alastair Pringle, NHS Inclusion
- 2004: Tuesday Bath St AA Group
- 2005: Waverley Care
- 2006: Liz McCann from Lanarkshire HIV AIDS and Hepatitis Centre

=== The Pride Scotia Award ===
The winner of this award was nominated by the festival organisers.

- Ken Livingstone
- Phil Carvosso
- Glasgow LGBT Centre
- Gordon Creelie - charity fundraising
- 2006: David Thomas, Coordinator Director, Strathclyde Gay and Lesbian Switchboard
