= AGLA (disambiguation) =

AGLA is a kabbalistic acronym. AGLA may also refer to:

- AGLA France (Association des Gays et Lesbiennes Arméniens de France)
- Above-Ground Living Area (AGLA) (real-estate valuation)
- Agrupación Guerrillera de Levante y Aragón, group of Spanish Maquis
