= Nora Radcliffe =

Scottish politician (born 1946)

Member of the Scottish Parliament for Gordon
- In office 6 May 1999 – 2 April 2007
- Preceded by: Constituency Created
- Succeeded by: Alex Salmond

Personal details
- Born: 4 March 1946 (age 80) Aberdeen, Scotland
- Party: Scottish Liberal Democrats
- Education: University of Aberdeen

Nora Radcliffe (born 4 March 1946, Aberdeen) is a former Scottish Liberal Democrat politician. She was the Member of the Scottish Parliament (MSP) for Gordon from 1999 to 2007. During her two terms in the Scottish Parliament she held various party spokespersonships, most frequently the Scottish Liberal Democrats' Equal Opportunities, Environment and Rural Development briefs.

== Parliamentary career ==
It is her work for the environment, campaigns to increase the provision of NHS dentistry in the North East of Scotland and her attempts to improve transport infrastructure in the area that Radcliffe was best known for during her time in as Gordon's MSP.

In the 2007 Scottish Parliament elections, she once more contested Gordon, but was defeated by Alex Salmond, the leader of the Scottish National Party, who won 14,650 votes to her 12,588.

== Awards ==
Radcliffe was awarded the "Friend for Life" award by the Equality Network in recognition of her work as the Scottish Parliament's first Reporter on Sexual Orientation Issues. This award is made to a non-LGBT person who has worked for equality.

Scottish Parliament
| New parliament Scotland Act 1998 | Member of the Scottish Parliament for Gordon; 1999–2007 | Succeeded by Alex Salmond |
