= Association of Nordic and Pol-Balt LGBTQ Student Organizations =

International non-profit organization

Association of Nordic and Pol-Balt Lesbian, Gay, Bisexual, Transgender and Queer Student Organizations
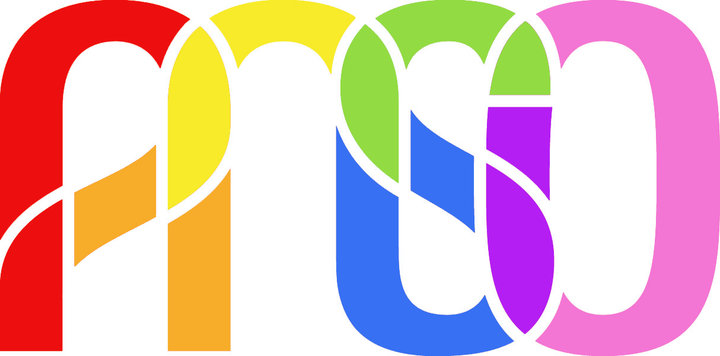
- Founded: November 2004
- Location: ul. Solec 30a, 00-403 Warszawa, Poland
- Region served: Nordic and Poland-Baltic states region
- Website: web.archive.org/web/20140517003635/http://ansoblog.wordpress.com/ www.anso.dk

The Association of Nordic and Pol-Balt Lesbian, Gay, Bisexual, Transgender and Queer Student Organizations (ANSO) is an international non-profit non-governmental organization striving to improve the quality of life of lesbian, gay, bisexual and trans - LGBT - students in the Nordic as well as Baltic countries. ANSO targets its activity to LGBT students in Denmark, Estonia, Faroe Islands, Finland, Iceland, Lithuania, Norway, Poland, Sweden and Åland.

== History ==
ANSO was founded in November 2004 in Denmark and has twelve member organizations:

- BLUS - Bøsse/Lesbiske Studerende of Denmark
- Friðarbogin & Bogin of Faroe Islands
- Q of Iceland
- Homoglobiini of Finland
- Telehpy of Finland
- SFQ of Sweden
- UgleZ of Norway
- Skeivt Forum of Norway
- Eesti Gei Noored of Estonia
- KPH of Poland
- TYA of Lithuania
- LGL of Lithuania

At its founding ANSO decided to have its seat in Mykines, Faroe Islands. In 2006 the seat of Anso was transferred to Denmark, as ANSO became a registered organization under Danish law.

ANSO is a member of IGLYO.

== Funding ==
The funding of ANSO activities relies on grants from the European Union, the Nordic Council of Ministers, and other sources of project grants.

== Achievements ==
ANSO organized the first gay pride event ever on Faroe Islands in 2005. ANSO has created a web forum for interchange of information and ideas between Nordic LGBT student organizations. In addition to this, ANSO has completed a Youth for Europe project in 2006 in Turku, Finland, discussing LGBT youth issues of small towns and remote areas. The next project, under the Youth in Action program, is "A Queer Perspective on European Students, in Stockholm, Sweden, in June 2007.
