= Geikristlaste Kogu =

LGBT organization in Estonia

- Founded: August 11, 2010
- Founder: Heino Nurk, Meelis Süld
- Type: NGO
- Purpose: LGBT rights
- Location: Tallinn, Estonia
- Region served: Estonia
- Key people: Heino Nurk (co-chair); Meelis Süld (co-chair)
- Website: gei.kristlased.ee

Geikristlaste Kogu (English: Association of Gay Christians), GK in short, is an Estonian LGBT rights organization of gays and lesbians who are active Christians.

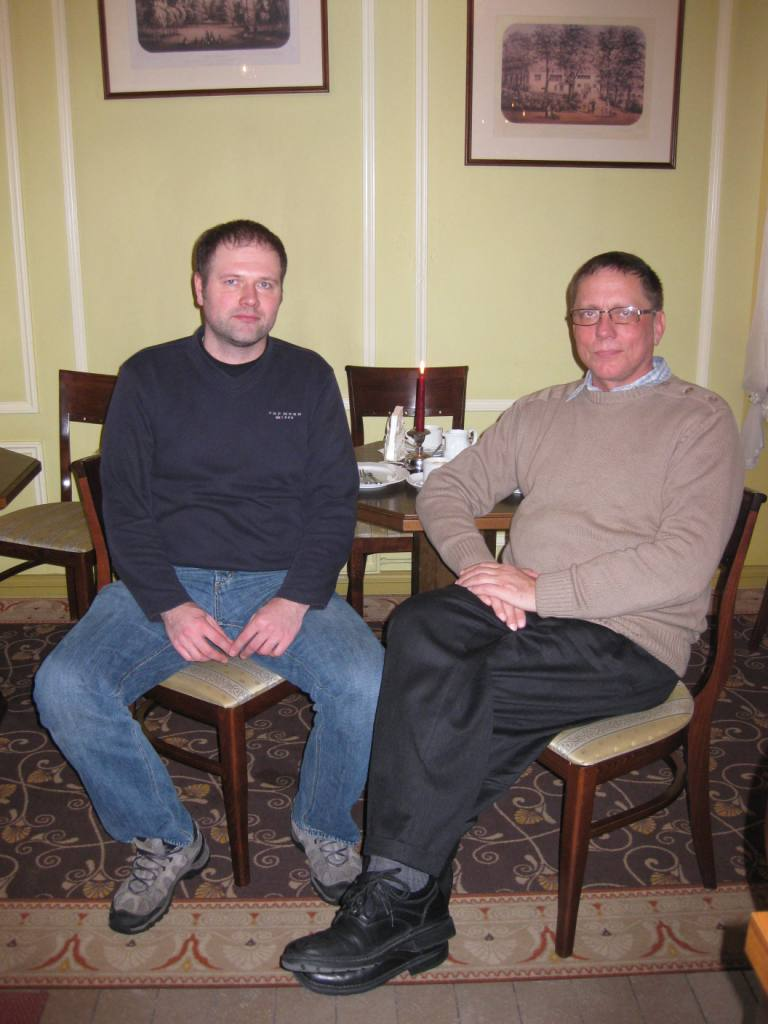
Meelis Süld (left) and Heino Nurk (right), Co-directors of GK at Tallinn on January 22, 2011

Logo used until September 2011

Founded on August 11, 2010, in Tallinn, Estonia, Geikristlaste Kogu is a religiously and politically independent non-governmental organization of homosexual Christians working for equal treatment and opportunities for sexual minorities in society and religious organizations. It supports spiritual and personal growth of individuals along with their mental and physical healing, while developing community life and offering reliable information about Christianity and sexual orientation. Since its foundation GK has been co-chaired by Heino Nurk and Meelis Süld.

Its first public event was a Christmas celebration held at X-Baar in Tallinn, on December 11, 2010.

Normal activities of GK include commentaries about pertinent news conveyed in its website and devotionals and networking centered in its Facebook page, particularly translations of daily devotionals by Chris Glaser. Members have also published some articles in mainline press such as: The Church should support gay marriage, Can a Christian be Gay?, and Hostility toward gays does not protect families

Internationally, since May 2011 GK has been a member of the European Forum of Lesbian, Gay, Bisexual and Transgender Christian Groups.

Meetings are held every Sunday at 12:00 hours at OMA Keskus in Tallinn.

== See also ==
- List of LGBT rights organizations
