= Pink Rose =

Finnish organization

Pink Rose (Finnish: Pinkkiruusu ry) is the first political LGBTQ association in Finland. It was formed during the 2004 Helsinki Pride by Jani Ryhänen, who is currently serving as president. The day the association formed, the second vice president of the Social Democratic Party of Finland and Minister of Labour, Tarja Filatov joined.

== See also ==
- LGBT rights in Finland
- List of LGBT rights organisations
