= Pride Glasgow =

Annual LGBT event in Glasgow, Scotland

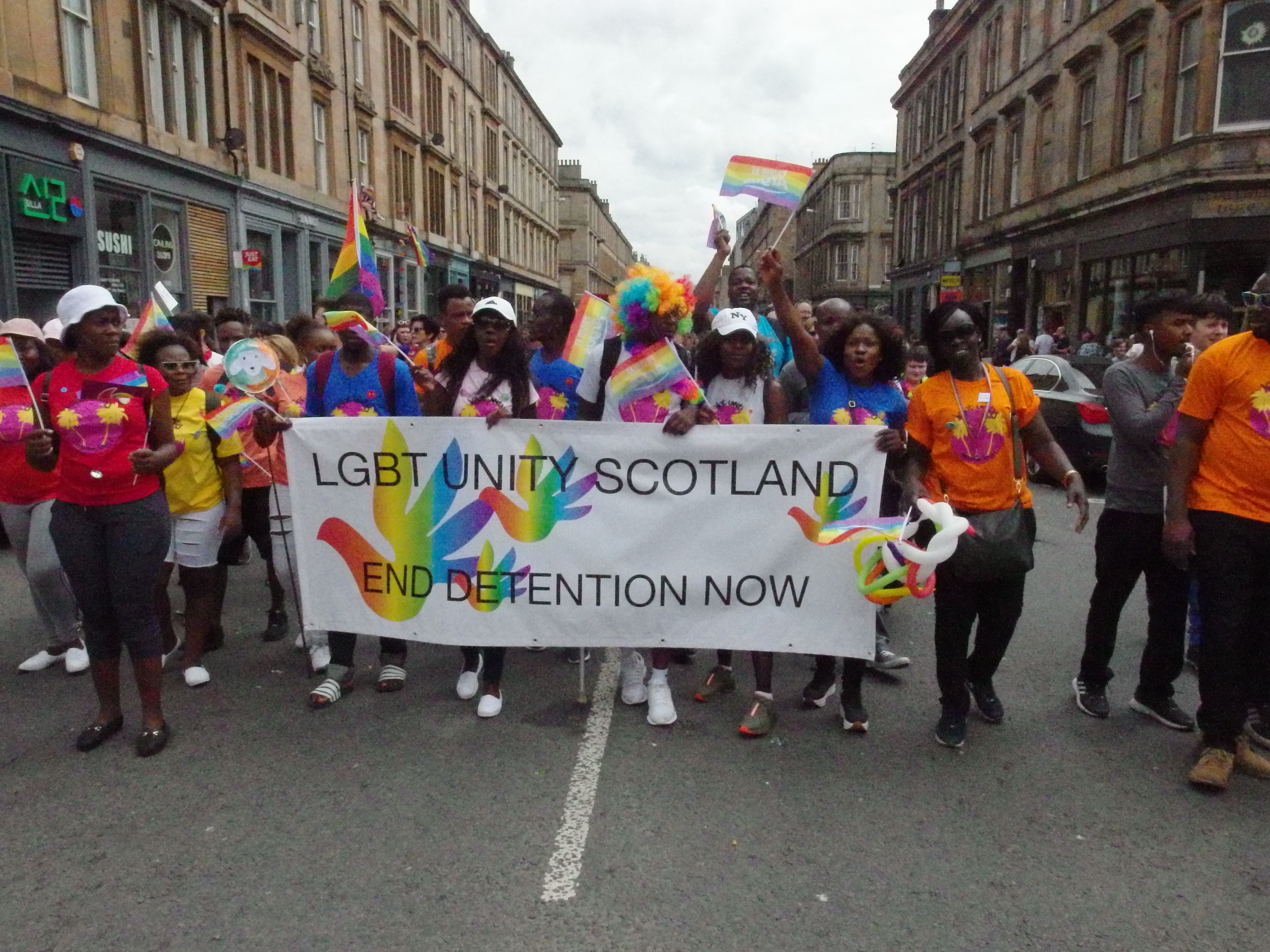
Pride Glasgow 2018

Pride Glasgow is an annual lesbian, gay, bisexual, and transgender (LGBT) pride festival held in Glasgow, Scotland. Typically around 50,000 people take part in the parade element of Glasgow Pride.

== History ==
Pride Glasgow was established in 2004 as Pride Scotia (Glasgow). But in 2008, the Glasgow arm of Pride Scotia announced it was splitting completely, and has since used the name Pride Glasgow. It became a corporate event in 2012 and has run annually from this time. Beginning in 2014, the organizers of Pride Glasgow have charged an admissions fee that works to "help raise money for The Pride Fund designed to support the LGBT Community in Glasgow and the West of Scotland." In protest, Free Pride Glasgow was founded in 2015 and has still continued despite planning controversies.

== Pride Glasgow 2017 ==
Pride Glasgow 2017 took place on the 19 and 20 August 2017 at Glasgow Green. The event featured the Pride Glasgow Arena, the main outdoor stage for Pride Glasgow. The 2017 line up included: B*Witched, Saara Aalto and Kelly Llorenna. The festival areas included a community expo, pride market, family area, youth space, VIP area, dog show, fairground, food village and bars.

== Controversy ==
Pride Glasgow 2018 took place on the 14 and 15 July 2018 at Kelvingrove Park. There was a widely covered issue caused by the overselling of tickets to the event which caused thousands to be left queuing outside the park for hours, whilst other people who pre-booked tickets were turned away at the entrance.

The issue attracted widespread criticism on social media, with many people sharing the organisations defaulted charity status too.

In the direct aftermath of the controversy, comedian Scott Agnew quit as host of the event, which he had hosted for the previous three years, citing witnessing mistreatment of hosts and volunteers as well as general mismanagement and the overselling of tickets as his reasons.

There was also a petition set up demanding the CEO of the charity, Alastair Smith, to stand down. The petition gathered thousands of signatures.

== See also ==
- Pride Scotia
