= Educational Action Challenging Homophobia =

LGBT charity in the UK

EACH
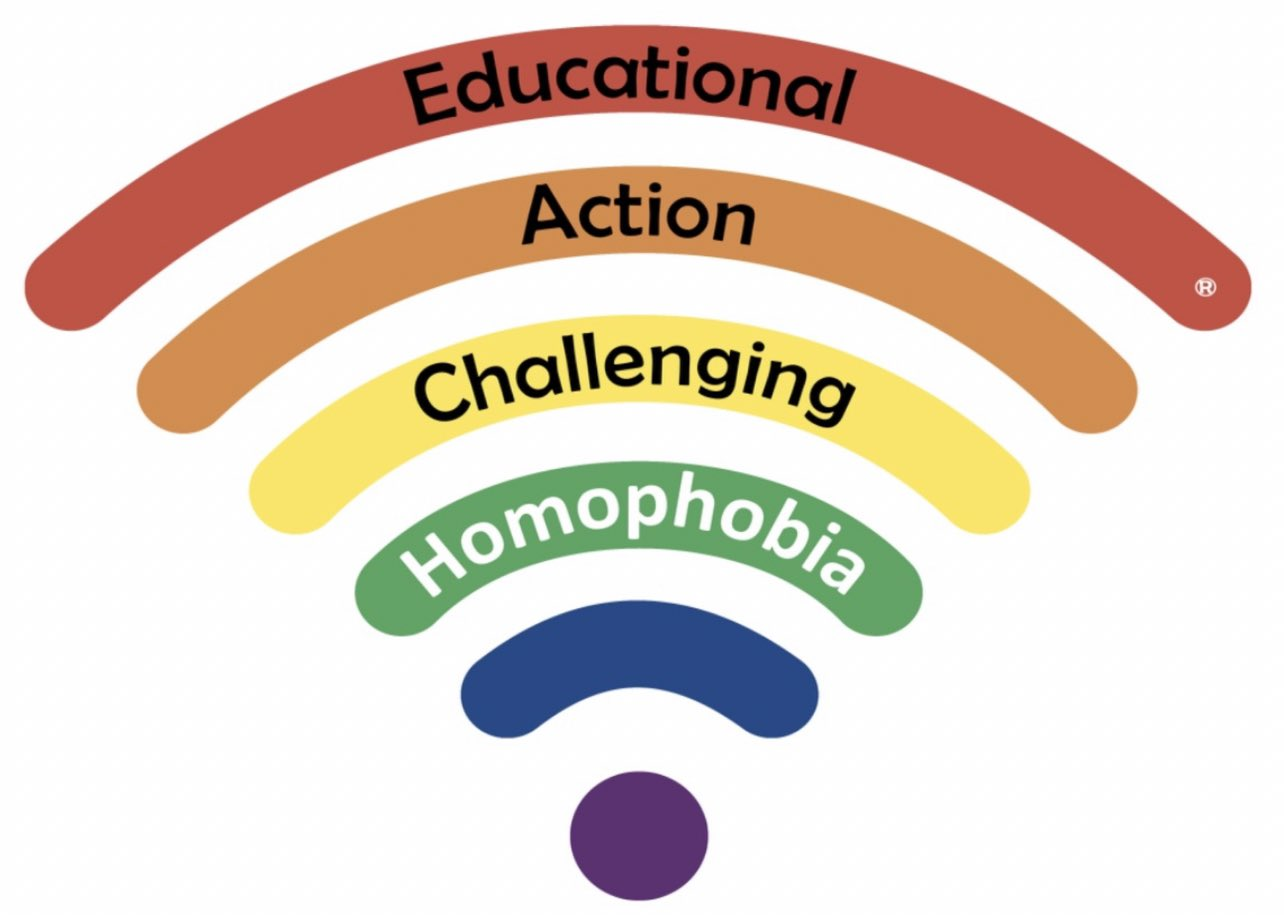
- EACH logo
- Formation: 2002; 24 years ago
- Type: NGO
- Legal status: Charity
- Headquarters: Bristol, UK
- Region served: Great Britain
- Founder: EACH Trustees
- Website: each.education

Educational Action Challenging Homophobia (EACH) is a charity based in the United Kingdom which "affirms the lives of lesbian, gay, bisexual and trans (LGBTQ) people and reduces discrimination experienced because of sexual orientation or gender identity." Since 2003, EACH has delivered training and consultancy services on sexuality and gender identity matters across the statutory, voluntary and private sectors. It also provides support to those affected by homophobic, biphobic or transphobic bullying through its nationwide, freephone helpline.

EACH was named Charity of the Year 2018 by the Ben Cohen Stand Up Foundation and in 2019 co-developed the Welsh Government's statutory anti-bullying guidance for Welsh schools in partnership with Youthworks. The book How To Stop Homophobic & Biphobic Bullying: A Practical Whole-School Approach, published in summer 2020, revises 2015's widely-acclaimed That's So Gay! Challenging Homophobic Bullying to provide a detailed overview of EACH's work with children, young people and their teachers.

== Early history ==
In 2007, the Department for Education commissioned EACH and Stonewall to create web-based guidance for UK schools—"Safe to Learn: Homophobic Bullying"—which continues to be widely used and applauded by many working within education.

In 2009, EACH was awarded a Big Lottery grant for the Reach project, a research project which utilised the knowledge and experience of young people to produce a toolkit for challenging homophobic, sexist and cyberbullying. With the help of over 3,500 13-21 year-olds across the West of England, the result was a DVD of films and connected activities on homophobia, sexism and cyberbullying plus guidance notes for teachers to help them understand their legal obligations and Ofsted requirements.

The young people involved in the project were subsequently awarded the 2013 Diana Anti-Bullying Award at a conference in London in February 2014. and the Reach Teaching Resource achieved the PSHE Association's Quality Assurance 'Kite Mark' the same year.

In January 2015, EACH received funding from the Ben Cohen StandUp Foundation towards its Youth Volunteering Programme. The EACH Youth Volunteering Programme provided opportunities for young people across Avon and Somerset to challenge homophobic, transphobic and cyber bullying. Young people aged 13–24 were encouraged to participate in a range of exciting activities and events providing opportunities to discuss prejudice-based bullying in a safe and non-judgmental environment, in which they devised youth-led awareness campaigns that promoted affirming representations of gay and transgender lives.

EACH was subsequently invited to contribute to "Safe to Learn: Bullying Out of School" and "Safe to Learn: Gender-related Bullying," the final guidance in the suite designed by the DCSF for UK schools. EACH has contributed to the Department's advice on preventing and tackling bullying and consulted closely with the Church of England in its creation of guidance to church schools to help challenge homophobic school bullying.

== Inspiring Equality in Education ==
In March 2015, The Government Equalities Office and Department for Education awarded EACH funding from a £2m package of support to promote lesbian, gay, bisexual and transgender (LGBT+) equality and challenge prejudice-based bullying in schools. EACH was one of only eight organisations selected nationally and led a consortium of local and national charities to work with West of England schools, delivering training to over 700 professionals.

The programme, 'Inspiring Equality in Education,' was created to help address the findings that schools often lack confidence and feel under-resourced to deal effectively with homophobic, biphobic or transphobic bullying, and draws on decades of professional practice gained from primary, secondary, rural, urban, faith and secular schools to ensure a safe and equal learning environment for all. The resource includes policy and practice guidance covering what the law says, teaching about LGBT+ identities and relationships, handling disclosures, staff training and development, improving anti-bullying policies and one-to-one support for LGBT+ young people.

The culmination of Each's work was the formulation of a bundle of school resources for KS1-4, Inspiring Equality in Education, which included 17 lesson plans, policy and practice guidance and an educational film, 'What is Gender?', to help young people explore gender diversity.

== The Learn Equality-Live Equal Programme ==
Following on from this, the Department for Education and the Government Equalities Office commissioned EACH for a programme running from March 2017 to March 2019, entitled 'Learn Equality-Live Equal.' EACH worked in partnership with the National Children's Bureau's Sex Education Forum and Anti-Bullying Alliance to deliver targeted support to over 350 schools in the East Midlands, West Midlands, South West and East of England. The programme promoted a whole school approach to effect change, aiming to equip teaching and non-teaching staff with the knowledge and skills to tackle prejudice and build inclusive school environments.

== See also ==
- LGBT rights in the United Kingdom
- List of LGBT rights organisations
- LGBT sex education
- Gay bashing
