= Eva Isaksson =

Finnish librarian and activist

Eva Isaksson (born 1953) is a Finnish librarian and non-fiction writer, with interests in astronomy and feminism. She was employed at the Helsinki University Observatory from 1981 and became a tenured astronomy librarian in 1998. In 2010, she transferred with the merger of the physics and astronomy departments to the Kumpula Science Library, on the Kumpula Campus. Isaksson and has been involved with the Finnish LGBT and pacifist movements since the 1970s. She produced the Lesbian Information Secretariat Newsletter for the International Lesbian Information Service from 1981 to 1983 and in the 1990s, began to create on-line platforms for lesbians to network. Recognizing the potential of on-line communication she established training programs to teach women at the university how to use computer technology to network with each other and to further their research goals. She was recognized in 1999 with the Maikki Friberg Equality Prize, an award given by the University of Helsinki to recognize persons who have furthered gender equality.

== Early life and education ==
Eva Isaksson was born 1953 in Finland. Her family's ancestral home was in Loppi. She recognized her sexuality when at fifteen, when she discovered advertisements in a gay magazine. In 1973, she published her first lesbian romance story and then began publishing in various magazines, such as 96, the first Finnish gay magazine and Seta magazine, the journal of the Finnish equality organization. Isaksson joined Seta, in 1978 and fought against the section of the penal code which prohibited public promotion of homosexuality, even though consensual relations among partners was not criminalized. In 1980, she joined Seta's board and participated in demonstrations at the Finnish Parliament. In a 1981 protest, Isaksson, speaking on behalf of the organization said that the section of the code could "be used to restrict the right of gay people to demonstrate against discrimination". During this time, she was pursuing her education and completed her master's degree in theoretical physics with a dissertation Gunnar Nordströmin elämäntyö: kaksi gravitaation skalaariteoriaa (Gunnar Nordström's Life's Work: Two Scalar Theories of Gravity) in 1980.

== Career ==
In 1981, Isaksson was hired by the Helsinki University Observatory as a research assistant. That year, she attended the International Lesbian Information Service (ILIS) conference in Turin, Italy, as a representative for Seta. Though she could tell that heated discussion was occurring, the fact that she was deaf, and no interpreter had been provided, impacted her ability to follow the proceedings. Other activists wrote notes explaining the conversations and finally someone wrote a synopsis for her of the debates on whether ILIS should remain as the lesbian section of the International Gay Association or become an independent umbrella organization for women. The women chose to become independent and Isaksson volunteered to organize and produce their official media. From 1981 to 1983, she was responsible for producing the Lesbian Information Secretariat Newsletter, as well as compiling, writing, curating, and distributing newsletters of affiliated associations and ILIS conference papers. The newsletters focused on issues faced by women within the network, including employment challenges, legal situations involving lesbian mothers, racism, political extremism and health, particularly the spread of HIV/AIDS. Because it was often difficult for lesbians to gain news coverage in their own national newspapers, the international exposure provided by these newsletters produced coverage and support from abroad.

At the university, Isaksson was promoted to work as an amanuensis, an administrator of a research facility, and then in 1998 became a tenured astronomy librarian at the observatory. In the early 1990s, shortly after the advent of the internet, Isaksson recognized its potential to improve communication and neutralize related problems in communication for the hearing impaired. She used her skill with organization and databases to create a comprehensive reference of various types of mailing lists for lesbians to use for networking. Her first lists were for Finnish lesbians, but she soon made lists to encompass Europe. She began training women at the university to use the internet for both research and networking, and pioneered the establishment of databases containing reference materials related to women's studies and women scientists. In 1999, she was the recipient of the Maikki Friberg Equality Prize, an award given by the University of Helsinki to recognize persons who have furthered gender equality, for her work in encouraging women to share information through technology.

Isaksson earned her qualification in Information Science in 2000. Her published works have centered on the history of physics and women's history. She published Nainen ja Maailmankaikkeus (Woman and the Universe), the first book in the Finnish language about female natural scientists in 1987. The following year, she attended an international conference hosted by the International Peace Bureau and the Peace Union of Finland. Women and the Military System, edited by Isaksson, was produced from the conference participants and examined the subordinate roles of women within military systems. The work collected historical accounts of women in various service branches from countries as far apart as Canada and Yugoslavia over a period of five hundred years. Themes of the book were that nationalism tends to drive militarization, and reduces the economic support available to create programs that provide social support to women and children.

In 2010, when the Astronomy and Physics departments of the University of Helsinki merged, they relocated to Kumpula Campus. At that time, Isaksson transferred with them to the Kumpula Science Library. Most of her work focuses on organizing astronomical information, teaching physics courses, supervising graduate students, and planning astronomy conferences. To organize the library's information, the librarians evaluate research publications and the CWTS Leiden Rankings to ensure that the library houses necessary supplemental materials, or has connections with other universities so that they can be acquired. In 2019, Isaksson was interviewed as part of the Queering Memory Archives Project during the Archives, Libraries, Museums and Special Collections Conference (ALMS Conference) held in Berlin. Her segment The Silent Lesbian Activist was part of a session on queer and trans disability.

== Selected works ==
- Isaksson, Eva, ed. (1984). 100 Years of Mach's Principle: Conference Publication. Helsinki: University of Helsinki. ISBN 978-951-45-3493-5.
- Isaksson, Eva, ed. (1986). Bibliography of Astronomical Publications at the University of Helsinki Observatory and Astrophysics Laboratory, 1815-1984. Helsinki: Yliopistopaino. ISBN 978-951-45-3996-1.
- Isaksson, Eva (1987). Nainen ja maailmankaikkeus [Woman and the Universe] (in Finnish). Helsinki: Tähtitieteellinen yhdistys Ursa. ISBN 978-951-9269-36-8.
- Isaksson, Eva, ed. (1988). Women and the Military System: Proceedings of a Symposium Arranged by the International Peace Bureau and Peace Union of Finland. New York City: St. Martin's Press. ISBN 978-0-312-01976-1.
- Isaksson, Eva (1994). Homona ja lesbona Euroopassa [Gay and Lesbian in Europe] (in Finnish). Helsinki: Seksuaalinen tasavertaisuus ry. ISBN 978-951-51-5039-4.
- Ricketts, Sandra; Birdie, Christina; Isaksson, Eva, eds. (2007). Library and Information Services in Astronomy V: Common Challenges, Uncommon Solutions. Astronomical Society of the Pacific conference co-hosted by the Harvard-Smithsonian Center for Astrophysics and Massachusetts Institute of Technology, Cambridge, Massachusetts, USA, 18–21 June 2006. San Francisco, California: Astronomical Society of the Pacific. ISBN 978-1-58381-316-4.
- Isaksson, Eva (2010). "Bibliometric Evaluation of the Changing Finnish Astronomy". Astronomical Society of the Pacific Conference Series. 433. San Francisco, California: Astronomical Society of the Pacific: 116–118. arXiv:1006.1714. Bibcode:2010ASPC..433..116I. ISSN 1050-3390. OCLC 742872383.
- Isaksson, Eva, ed. (2010). Library and Information Services in Astronomy VI: 21st Century Astronomy Librarianship, from New Ideas to Action. Astronomical Society of the Pacific conference held at IUCAA & NCRA, Pune, Maharashtra, India 14–17 February 2010. Astronomical Society of the Pacific Conference Series. Vol. 433. San Francisco, California: Astronomical Society of the Pacific. ISBN 978-1-58381-746-9.
