= Orikalankini =

Organization and support group

- Founded: 2013
- Location: Delhi NCR

Orikalankini is an organisation and support group working to change narratives around menstruation and sexuality in India. Founded in 2013, the conversations are through art and dialogue and was started by Dr Sneha Rooh.

The group has an annual 13-week fellowship, where the identified 13 teens and adults implement projects and initiatives were interested in. Orikalankini also collaborated up for a fellowship, Gender and Sexuality Lab with Nazariya.

== Initiatives ==
Survivors at the Coffee Shop was comic published by fellow at Orikalankini to increase awareness about sex education and child abuse. It was a collection of 10 stories, edited by Tenzin Norwang and Khushi Patel, and illustrated by Sanika Dhakepalkar.

In 2020, Pads Thats Last – Leave no one Padless was a fundraiser initiative by Orikalankini to collect funds to be able to make cloth pads for menstruators during the lockdown.

As a part of this initiative, 25 workshops were conducted villages of Kargil and reusable cloth pads were distributed to 800 teachers, Anganwadi workers and young girls in Miyapur and Moosapet.

== See also ==
- Period. End of Sentence.
- Menstrual hygiene management
- Menstrual Hygiene Day
