= LGBTQ culture in Brighton and Hove =

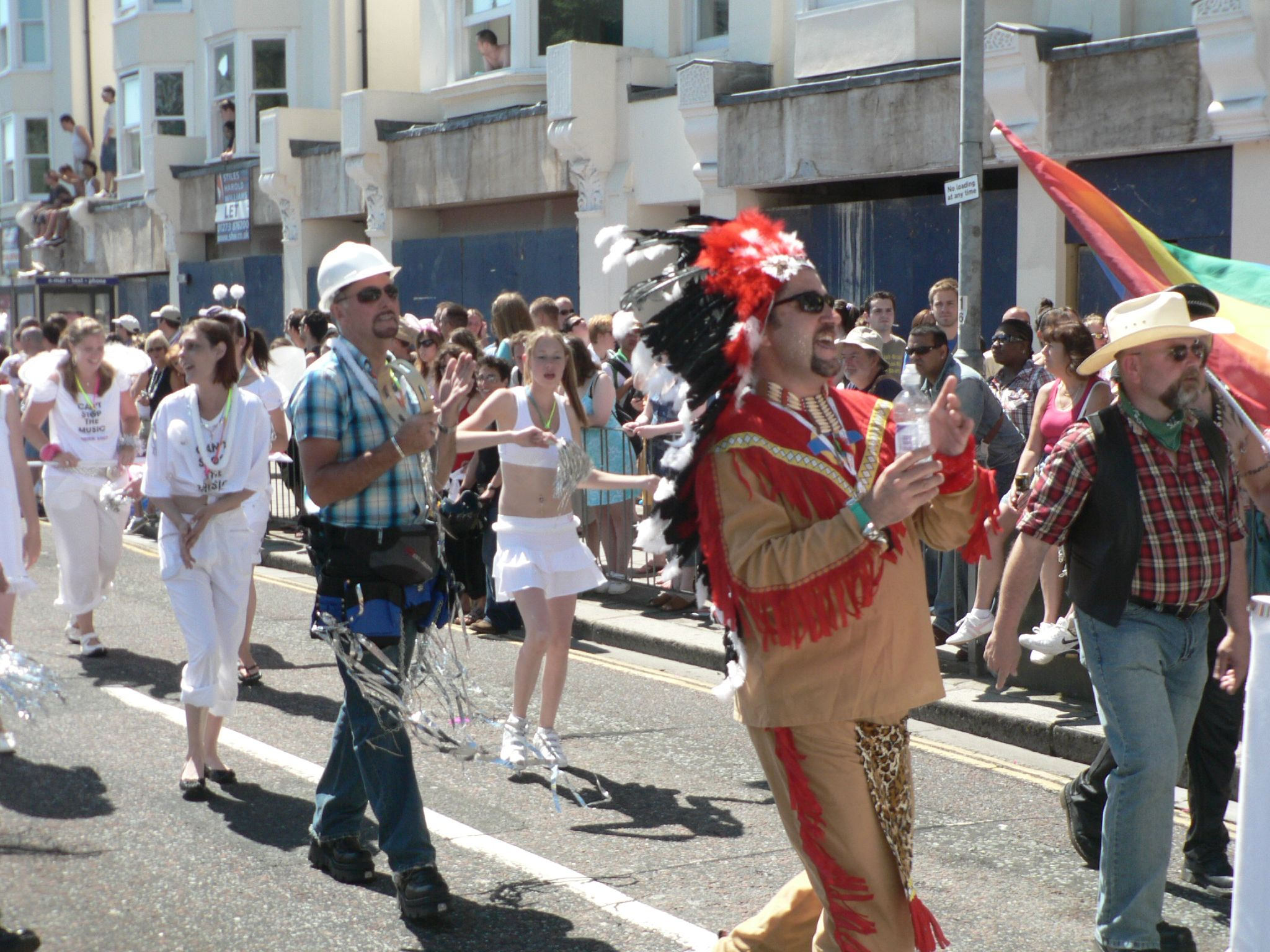
People enjoying the annual Brighton Pride carnival event, in 2007

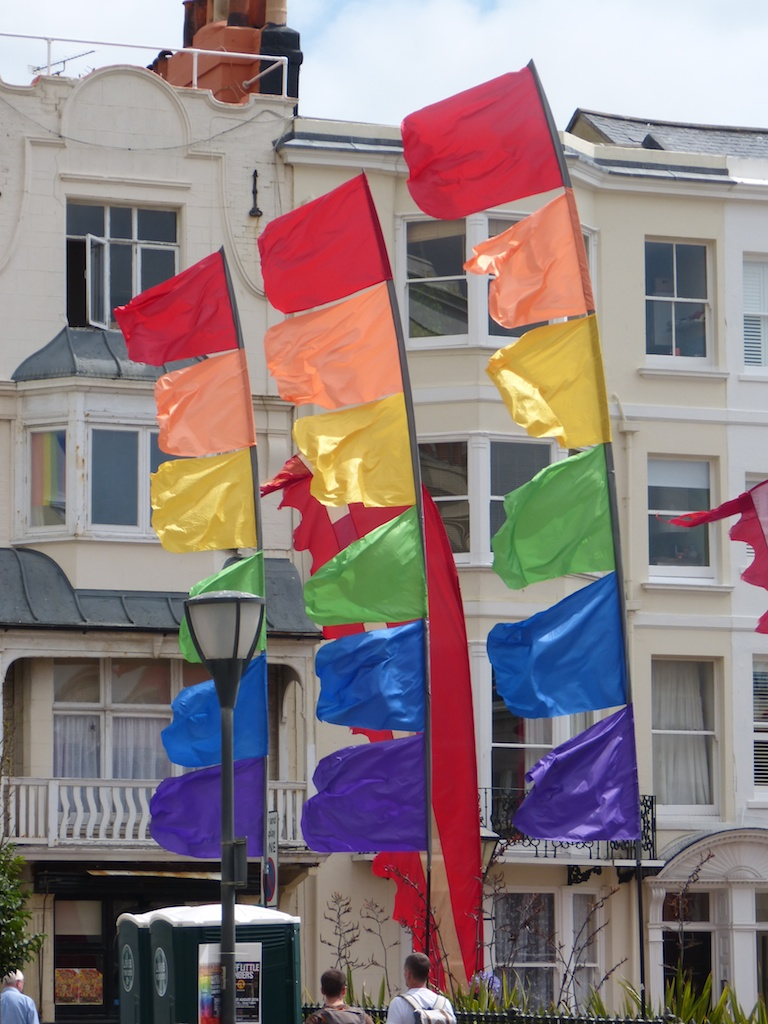
Rainbow flags in St James's Street, Kemptown

The LGBTQ community of Brighton and Hove is one of the largest in the United Kingdom. Brighton, a seaside resort on the south coast of England, has been described in some media as a "gay capital" of the UK, with records pertaining to LGBTQ history dating back to the early 19th century.

Many LGBTQ pubs, clubs, bars, restaurants, cafés and shops are located around Brighton and in particular around St James's Street in Kemptown. Several LGBTQ charities, publishers, social and support groups are also based in the city. Brighton Pride is the largest Pride event in the UK, celebrated at the start of August and attracting as many as 450,000 people.

In the 2021 National Census, 11% of the city's population identified as LGB+. The city also had the highest percentage of same-sex households in the UK in 2004 and the largest number of civil partnership registrations outside London in 2013.

== History ==
Brighton has recorded LGBT history in the city since the 19th century. Many men were initially drawn to Brighton by the enormous numbers of soldiers garrisoned in the town during the Napoleonic Wars. Evidence suggests that a floating population and good transport links with London helped its reputation as a place for the LGBT community. By the 1930s, Brighton started to flourish as a gay destination and many gay and lesbian pubs started to establish themselves. During the Second World War, Brighton was filled with soldiers. Women and men in the forces who were away from home meeting other lesbians and gay people for the first time in their lives also heard about Brighton and its special pleasures and helped turn it into a gay destination in the post-war years.

Students at the University of Sussex formed the Sussex Gay Liberation Front (SGLF) in February 1971. The SGLF organized Brighton's first gay rights demonstration - Brighton Gay Day - in October 1972. Gay News described it, "...even if only 30 gays did come out with their banners for the rerouted march along the seafront and into a shopping precinct." Images of the march in Gay News' 14 November 1972 edition show marchers along Kings Road and at the Churchill Square Shopping Centre.

The following year, SGLF combined protest with celebration, launching Brighton's first Gay Pride Week from Friday, July 6th, 1973 to Sunday, July 8th, 1973. The event included a public gay wedding, one of Britain's first, between John Roman Baker and his boyfriend Graham Charles Wilkinson, later founder of the Sussex AIDS Helpline. Saturday's Gay Pride March began at Norfolk Square before heading south to the waterfront and along Kings Road to The Ship Hotel. The march would be Brighton's last until 1988. That evening, 200 people attended the dance at The Royal Albion Hotel. The weekend concluded with a Gay Picnic on the beach across from the present-day Queens Hotel.

In 1988, Brighton Area Action Against Section 28 formed out of a meeting of Brighton Lesbian Action. BAAAS28 held a march each May from 1988 to 1991, beginning at Hove's Town Hall and ending at Brighton's Town Hall. These marches evolved into 1991's Brighton Pride Weekend which concluded with a picnic in Preston Park.

== Demographics ==
In a 2014 estimate, 11-15% of the city's population aged 16 or over is thought to be lesbian, gay or bisexual. The 2001 census revealed that Brighton and Hove had the highest proportion of same-sex households in the UK at 1.29%: 2,544 persons said that they lived with a person of the same sex. The 2011 census did not measure same-sex households specifically but showed that Brighton and Hove had the highest number of civil partnerships in the UK, at 2,346 individuals or 3.1% of all legal relationships within the unitary authority area. The city also had the largest number of civil partnership registrations outside London in 2013. The 2021 census showed that the largest percentage of LGBTQ+ reside in the Kemptown area, where 20.11% of respondents said they were LGBO (Lesbian, Gay, Bisexual, or Other).

== Events ==
Crowds at Brighton Pride near Brighton Palace Pier in August 2011.

Brighton Pride is an event, and wider organization, which promotes equality and diversity, and advances education to eliminate discrimination against the LGBT community. The major event is an annual summer festival held in the first week of August, which usually consists of a parade through the city centre, a festival event in Preston Park, the Pride Village Party and other club parties. Since 2013, it has also included an Arts and Film Festival and a Pride Dog Show.

The parade has attracted as many as 450,000 attendees and 50,000 people attend the park festival in 2018. The event brings 2% of the city's annual visitors in one day and in 2018 introduced an estimated £18 million to the city's economy. It is credited as one of the main ways Brighton has boosted its economy from tourism.

Trans Pride has taken place every July since 2013 with a parade and a weekend of events.

Eyes Wide Open is a queer film strand, regularly showcasing sexual and gender minorities on screens across the city.

== Organisations ==
The Brighton & Hove LGBT Switchboard is a telephone helpline that describes itself as 'providing a service to the lesbian, gay, bisexual & trans communities since April 1975' and is one of the oldest in the UK.

The Clare Project is a local support group which provides a safe and confidential meeting place for anyone exploring issues around their gender identity. It was founded in 2000 as a meetup group for transgender women, before growing and becoming a charity in 2016.

A bus displaying a banner for BlackOut, a group associated with MindOut, at Brighton Pride in August 2011.

MindOut is a mental health service run by and for LGBT people, based in Brighton and Hove.

The city also has the Allsorts Youth Project which aims to meet the needs of lesbian, gay, bisexual, trans and unsure youth in Brighton & Hove and the wider East Sussex area.

Both Brighton and Sussex universities have active LGBT organizations and they often work together to cater to the needs of LGBT students. Sussex LGBTQ is for students at the University of Sussex and LGBrighTon is for students at Brighton University.

The Brighton Ourstory Project was set up to collect and preserve lesbian and gay community history in the area.

Brighton has a gay and lesbian sports society called BLAGSS which offers a range of 17 sports or activities to its 600+ members. The city also has LGBTQ+ sports clubs such as Brighton & Hove Sea Serpents RFC, a branch of the international Frontrunners, Brighton & Hove Frontrunners, formed in 2018, which holds an annual Rainbow Run 5k the day before Brighton Pride and a branch of the LGBTQ+ aquatics Out to swim (Out To Swim Brighton), plus many more. There are also two congregations of the Metropolitan Community Church.

== Historical events ==
An early recording of the LGBT community in Brighton was in August 1822, when George Wilson, a servant from Newcastle upon Tyne, was accused by a guardsman he had met in the Duke of Wellington public house in Pool Valley of having offered him a sovereign and two shillings to go with him onto the beach to "commit an unnatural crime".

Another early story of the LGBT community in the area is that of philanthropist Angela Burdett-Coutts (1814–1906), a friend of both Charles Dickens and the Duke of Wellington, who spent part of each year at the Royal Albion Hotel with her companion Hannah. The couple were devoted to each other, socially recognised as a pair, and even sent joint Christmas cards. When Hannah died in 1878, Baroness Burdett-Coutts said she was utterly crushed by the loss of "my poor darling, the companion and sunshine of my life for 52 years".

A walking tour 'Piers & Queers' explores the historical sites and characters of LGBT interest.

== See also ==
- Trans Pride Brighton
