= Adelaide Pride March =

Annual LGBTQIA+ parade in Australia

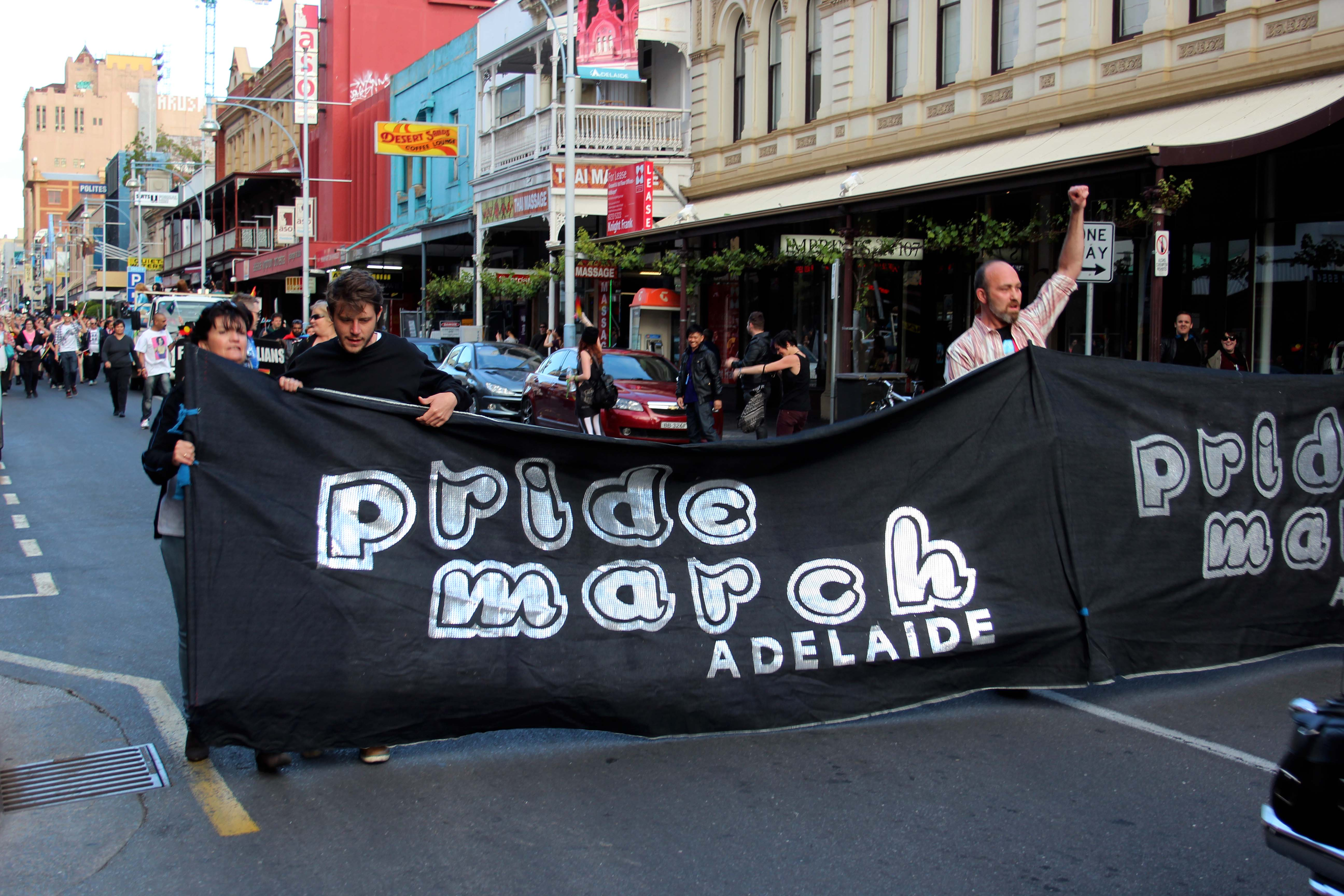
Adelaide Pride March in 2013

The Adelaide Pride March is an annual LGBTQIA+ parade held in Adelaide, South Australia. The first organised march was in 1973 as part of a week of activities held across Australia including Brisbane, Melbourne and Sydney for national 'Gay Pride Week'. Annual marches were established in 2003 as part of the Feast Festival. The event builds on earlier LGBTQIA+ activism in South Australia, particularly the 1973 Proud Parade, one of the earliest organised LGBTQIA+ demonstrations in Australia.

== History ==
The first organised LGBTQIA+ march in Adelaide was the Proud Parade, held on 15 September 1973 by the Gay Activists Alliance Adelaide. It formed part of a national Gay Pride Week, with a range of activities raising awareness of the gay liberation movement, held in Adelaide, Brisbane, Sydney and Melbourne.Additionally, the Adelaide march followed the death of Dr George Ian Duncan, a University of Adelaide law lecturer who drowned in the River Torrens in May 1972 after being attacked for being gay. His death prompted public debate and became a catalyst for law reform regarding homosexuality in South Australia.

The 1973 march, which attracted around 100 participants, is recognised as one of the earliest public pride events in Australia. The march raised awareness of issues affecting LGBTQIA+ people, including discrimination and legal inequalities. Early activism during this period helped shape the political climate in which Premier Don Dunstan and the South Australian parliament passed legislation in 1975 decriminalising male homosexuality, making South Australia the first Australian state to do so.

An annual Adelaide Pride March was established in 2003, when it became closely associated with the Feast Festival, South Australia's LGBTQIA+ arts and cultural festival. Since then the event has grown to include thousands of participants, including community organisations, advocacy groups and allies.

In 2023, Adelaide marked the 50th anniversary of the 1973 Proud Parade with commemorative events that highlighted the historical significance of LGBTQIA+ activism in South Australia.

One of the leading organisers of the Adelaide Pride March, Eric Kuhlmann, passed away in 2025, aged 50.

== Route and activities ==
The march traditionally proceeds along central streets of Adelaide, often beginning near Rundle Street or Hindley Street before converging in Victoria Square/Tarntanyangga. Activities include speeches, performances, and displays from local artists and community organisations.

== Social and cultural significance ==
The Adelaide Pride March has played an important role in increasing public awareness of LGBTQIA+ issues and promoting social inclusion. It commemorates local LGBTQIA+ activism and highlights ongoing challenges faced in South Australia. The march has similarities and connections with Australian pride parades while commemorating South Australia's historical role in advancing LGBTQIA+ rights reform during the 1970s.
