= Nazariya =

Is a queer feminist resource group based in New Delhi, India

- Founded: October 2014
- Location: Delhi NCR
- Website: nazariyaqfrg.wordpress.com

Nazariya: A Queer Feminist Resource Group (Nazariya QFRG) is a non-profit queer feminist resource group based out of Delhi NCR, India. The group was formed in October 2014, and has since established a South Asian presence. The organization undertakes workshops/seminars, helpline- and case-based counselling, and advocacy to affirm the rights of persons identifying as lesbian and bisexual women, and transgender persons assigned female at birth. Nazariya QFRG also works to inform queer discourse in institutions, and build linkages between queer issues, violence and livelihoods. They focus on the intersectionality between queer, women’s and progressive left movements in India.

In 2015, Nazariya QFRG supported 19-year-old Shivy by arranging legal counsel, safe shelter and passage to Delhi to challenge the illegal confinement inflicted on him by his parents in Agra. In 2018, the organization endorsed a critique of the Trafficking of Persons (Prevention, Protection and Rehabilitation) Bill, 2018, India, which was censured by many scholars, lawyers and activists for criminalizing vulnerable individuals in the absence of adequate measures to address the factors that make persons vulnerable to trafficking in the first place.

== Name origin ==
The word Nazariya means "a way of seeing" or "a perspective". This name reflects the group's mission to make marginalized perspectives heard, in order to counter the toxic cultural and societal "hegemony of heteronormativity".

== Key concerns ==
The group aims to sensitize groups and individuals working on issues of gender-based violence, education, health and livelihoods from a lesbian, bisexual and transgender (LBT) perspective. They support this work through training, research, advocacy, evaluations and capacity building. Nazariya QFRG works to raise awareness of the 'lived realities' of queer people, and focuses on many issues of work in India and South Asia, including but not limited to HIV & AIDS awareness; sensitivity towards Sexual Orientation and Gender Identity (SOGI); the criminalization of intercourse against the order of nature under Section 377 of the Indian Penal Code; non-inclusion of queer individuals in violence, health and education interventions; non-inclusion of and discrimination against queer individuals in the workspace; lack of support groups in tier-II and tier-III cities, towns and rural areas in India; lack of an intersectionality approach in the discourse on identities

=== Mental Health ===
Nazariya QFRG have maintained that members of the queer community face significant familial, societal, and legal discrimination on the basis of their identity in addition to the stresses brought on by everyday life such as work, relationships, and peer pressure. This additional, unique stress is known as minority stress, which is defined as the additional stress an individual experiences as a result of their status as a minority. Since 2017, the resource group has been working on what mental wellbeing means for queer persons. In September and December 2017, Nazariya QFRG worked with Delhi-based SRHR NGO TARSHI on a series of free, bilingual workshops on stress management and burnout prevention for LGBT*QIA+ individuals. The workshops emphasized self-care as a feminist issue and functioned on a non-medical model with an emphasis on simple stress management techniques that can be practiced individually without any additional equipment or resources.

== Shivy's Story ==
In September, 2015 Nazariya QFRG was contacted by the National Centre for Lesbian Rights (NCLR), United States, and subsequently by the teenager himself, regarding the illegal confinement and human rights violation of 19-year-old trans person Shivy. An Indian citizen who had been living in the US since age 3, Shivy who identified as a female-assigned-at-birth trans person, was brought to Agra soon after his parents discovered he had a girlfriend; in Agra, his travel documents and passport were confiscated by his parents, and he was forced to enrol in a local college. Shivy was under parental custody and forced to live at home with the prospect of an impending arranged marriage to an Indian man to 'fix' him. Shivy also used the resource group's YouTube channel to publish a video recounting his experiences.

In October 2015, Nazariya QFRG arranged for legal counsel Arundhati Katju to file a Writ Petition in the Delhi High Court on behalf of Shivy for protection from harassment and his right to return to the United States. In Shivani Bhat v. National Capital Territory of Delhi & Others, the Delhi High Court ruled in favour of Shivy and reaffirmed his right to self-determination, travel and education. Additionally, the court ordered, inter alia, that Shivy's parents return his travel documents so he could travel back to the US.

Shivy returned to Northern California to study neurobiology at UC-Davis after the judgment was announced. Commenting on the judgement, he said that "[the judge] basically applied the law rightfully," and that "it’s sad that this had to be celebrated, but a lot of laws don’t get applied justly for LGBT people." Shivy now chooses to be identified by another name.

== Activities ==
=== Helpline ===
The organization runs a helpline (operational Monday to Friday 11 AM-6 PM, +91-9818151707) out of their Delhi office space. They believe in the merit of an offline or online space that caters to LBT persons describing their sexual experiences and encounters, as well as for family and friends of the LBT persons.

=== 'Our Lives Our Tales' ===
Our Lives, Our Tales is an ongoing archival oral history project by Nazariya QFRG to document queer history and queer lived realities in India.

=== Ishq, Dosti and All That ===
In 2018, two of the co-founders of Nazariya QFRG were involved in a bilingual short-film on the lives of Rups and Priyam, a trans man and a lesbian, their loves, desires, dating experiences, friendships and intimate relationships. Ishq, Dosti and All That was screened on 16 September 2018 at the India International Centre, New Delhi.

=== Fellowship ===
In collaboration with Orikalankini, Nazariya offered a Gender and Sexuality Lab 13-week Teen fellowship to increase the awareness around gender and sexuality.

== People ==
The following activists founded the group and continue to play pivotal roles in the functioning of the organization:

1. Ritambhara Mehta — Responsible for organizational development, programme implementation, and fundraising.
2. Rituparna Borah — Responsible for fundraising, programme development and networking, Borah is a queer feminist activist who has spoken about and published on her personal experiences, being a lesbian, and on feminism and protest such as 'SlutWalk'.
3. Purnima Gupta — Board Member. Feminist and civil rights activist.
