= Against Ignorance =

Organization

- Founded: February 2014 in India
- Type: Non-profit; NGO
- Headquarters: Kochi, India
- Location: Global
- Services: Protecting human rights
- Fields: Media attention, direct-appeal campaigns

Against ignorance is a Humanist group founded in Kochi, Kerala in early 2014 by Ajay Appaden and Christin George. The first major event of the group was held on 12 February 2014. The event was a bike-a-thon and the bikers rode an estimated 100 miles (160 kilometers) from Edapally in the city of Kochi to Thrissur to attend the ViBGYOR Film Festival. This campaign came in the wake of the reinstatement of Section 377 of the Indian Penal Code, which criminalises sexual activities "against the order of nature", arguably including homosexual acts in India. The group also conducted multiple Free Hugs campaigns in Kochi.
