= GenderDoc-M =

LGBTQ+ organization in Moldova

- Formation: May 8, 1998
- Headquarters: Valeriu Cupcea 72/1, MD-2021, Chișinău, Moldova
- Official language: Romanian
- Website: https://gdm.md/en/home-eng-test/

GenderDoc-M is a Moldovan LGBTQI+ organization; providing news about LGBQTI+ rights in mainly in Moldova and occasionally surrounding areas such as Romania.

== History ==
GenderDoc-M was started on May 8, 1998, with the goal to promote LGBTQ+ rights; being the oldest organization to do so in the Republic of Moldova. During its work, it has completed over 50 projects; varying in scale. They started the organization for quote, "Creating a favorable legal and social environment in society for people of different sexual orientations, gender identities, gender expressions and sexual characteristics by developing the LGBT+ community, informing, promoting rights, providing services and organizational development." The centre was awarded the UN Representation Award in Moldova for quote, "for its work in combating discrimination through litigation, advocacy, and educational activities" and "is the only [organization] in Moldova that defends the interests and rights of LGBT+ groups at the national and international level"

=== Values ===
Their values and principles are as follows;

- "Everyone has equal rights, including civil, political, social, economic, and cultural rights."
- "No one has the right to discriminate and humiliate a person regardless of their sexual orientation or gender identity."
- "Everyone has the right to receive accurate information about the legal aspects related to sexual orientation and gender identity."
- "Human rights organizations and activists should be guided by the principles of universality, indivisibility, interdependence, and close relationship with human rights, including LGBT+ rights."
- "The state has the obligation to prevent and, in the case of illegal acts, prosecute an offender accused of committing acts of discrimination and violence, inciting violence and hatred, and humiliating or insulting a person based on their sexual orientation and/or gender identity."
- "The state and the media must objectively inform the public about various aspects of sexual orientation or gender identity."
- "Everyone has the right to be recognized and to express their gender identity."
- "The state must legally recognize the existence of same-sex couples and grant them the same rights as heterosexual couples."

== Funding and Partnering Organizations ==
=== Funding Organizations ===
The following is a list of funding organizations of GenderDoc-M;

- United Nations Human Rights Office of the High Commissioner
- Open Society Foundations
- ILGA-Europe
- Soros Foundation Moldova
- TGEU
- Sigrid Rausing Trust
- ABA Rule of Law Initiative
- Civil Rights Defenders
- COC Nederland
- Swedish International Development Cooperation Agency

=== Partnering Organizations ===
The following is a list of partnering organizations of GenderDoc-M;

- International HIV/AIDS Alliance in Ukraine
- Amnesty International
- CCM.md
- United Nations Human Rights Office of the High Commissioner
- Swedish International Development Cooperation Agency
- Discriminare Media
- Coalitia Nedeterminare
