= South Australian Rainbow Advocacy Alliance =

Australian LGBTQ activism organization

- Abbreviation: SARAA
- Named after: Rainbow flag (LGBTQ)
- Type: Advocacy
- Region served: South Australia
- Official language: Australian English
- CEO: Varo Lee

South Australian Rainbow Advocacy Alliance (SARAA) is the South Australian peak body for LGBTIQA+ South Australians. It is known for its systemic advocacy and activism relating to the LGBTIQA+ community in South Australia such as banning conversion practices and removal of gay panic defence to murder charges. The "godfather of the gay community" in South Australia, Ian Purcell, was a founding member of the organisation.

== Advocacy work ==
In 2017, the South Australian Rainbow Advocacy Alliance called on the South Australian Government to remove the "gay panic" defence, which allowed for murder charges to be downgraded to manslaughter if the accused lost control after the victim made an unwanted sexual advance. South Australian Rainbow Advocacy Alliance Chairperson Andrew Birtwistle-Smith stated:

It sends the message that the LGBTQ community is less important, when a life can be taken and the attacker can use this draconian law to lessen their defence.

In 2020, the South Australian Rainbow Advocacy Alliance launched a petition with Equality Australia to remove the defence. Although it was the first state to decriminalise homosexuality in 1975, South Australia was the last state to remove a "gay panic" defence. More than 38,000 people signed the petition, and the legislation to end the defence was passed in December 2020. South Australian Rainbow Advocacy Alliance Chairperson, Matthew Morris, described the reform as "long overdue".

South Australian Rainbow Advocacy Alliance called for a ban on "gay conversion practices", which came into effect in 2024. The Australian Christian Lobby criticized the ban, stating that it would silence Australians providing traditional advice on gender and marriage such as through "biblical sexual ethic" courses run by churches.

In 2026, South Australian Rainbow Advocacy Alliance CEO Varo Lee called on the South Australian Government to introduce anti-vilification laws to protect LGBITQA+ South Australian's. Lee stated in InDaily that openly gay Members of Parliament Robert Simms and Ian Hunter had both reported a recent rise in homophobic abuse.
