= International Lesbian Information Service =

The International Lesbian Information Service (ILIS) was an international organization which aimed at fostering international lesbian organizing. It was started within ILGA in 1980. The following year, at a separate lesbian conference arranged prior to the ILGA Turin conference, lesbian organizations decided that ILIS should become a separate organization.

== History ==
ILIS arranged eleven international conferences in Europe, and supported lesbian conferences in Latin America and Asia through their regional networks (the Latin America Network and the Asian Lesbian Network).

In Turin in 1981, criticism concerning the lack of visibility of lesbians in the gay movement, as well as the cost of participation for lesbian activist to the ILGA conferences led to the separation of ILIS from ILGA. Paola Bachetta recalls leaving ILGA to form ILIS also in reaction to the lack of inclusivity towards postcolonial issues. Subsequently, the following ILIS conferences included intersectional workshops on racism, lesbophobia and postcolonial issues.

ILIS was represented at the 1985 United Conference on the status of women, as a result of the decision to reach out to non western lesbians. In 1986, the ILIS Geneva conference fundraised money to strive towards the participation of lesbians coming from postcolonial countries. One of the main topic of the conference was "Political Exile for Lesbians of All Countries". The following conferences had to face some criticism about unchallenged assumptions: the fact that the conferences were meant for outed lesbians and did not take into consideration others types of lesbian expressions under oppressive regimes, and the fact that western countries were presented as saviors to third world countries.

The activities seem to have gradually stopped in the late 1990s, with their final newsletter being published in 1998.

The ILIS Secretariat, which also coordinated the publishing of regular newsletters, rotated as follows:

- Amsterdam 1980–81. Coordinated by Interpot. Published the ILIS cheap stencil service.
- Helsinki 1981–1983. Eva Isaksson published the ILIS Newsletter and ILIS conference papers.
- Oslo 1984. Published the ILIS Newsletter.
- Geneva 1985–86. Coordinated by Vanille-Fraise. Published the ILIS Bulletin under Clit 007.
- Amsterdam 1987–1998. Coordinated by Interpot. Published the ILIS Newsletter.

== Conferences ==
Below are listed the international lesbian conferences organised by ILIS in Europe in conjunction with local lesbian organisations, the presence of ILIS representatives at three UN World Conferences on Women, as well as the Latin American and Asian Lesbian Conferences that were organised either with the help of ILIS or to which ILIS member groups attended:

- 1980: 5–6 April – Creation of ILIS at IGA (now ILGA) Barcelona Conference, Spain
- 1980: 14–30 July – ILIS at UN World Conference on Women in Copenhagen, Denmark
- 1980: 27–31 December – ILIS Conference in Amsterdam, the Netherlands
- 1981: 15–17 April – ILIS Conference in Turin, Italy (ILIS separates from IGA)
- 30 December 1981 – 3 January 1982: ILIS Conference in Lichtaart, Belgium
- 1982: 3–5 September – ILIS Conference in Sheffield, England
- 1983: 1–4 April – ILIS Conference in Paris, France
- 30 December 1983 – 1 January 1984: ILIS International Action Meeting in Amsterdam, the Netherlands
- 1984: 19–23 April – ILIS Conference in Stockholm, Sweden
- 1985: 4–8 April – ILIS Conference in Cologne, Germany
- 1985: 15–26 July – ILIS at UN World Conference on Women in Nairobi, Kenya
- 1986: 25–28 March – ILIS Conference in Geneva, Switzerland. Creation of Latin American and Asian regional networks.
- 1987: 14–16 October – First meeting of Latin American, Caribbean and Chicana Lesbian Feminists in Mexico City, Mexico
- 1988: 18–22 August – ILIS European Regional Conference in Amsterdam, the Netherlands
- 1988: 2 October – Creation of ILIS Asia Subgroup, based in Amsterdam
- December 1988 – March 1989: Creation of ILIS Latin America Subgroup, based in Amsterdam
- 1990: 18–22 January – ILIS Conference in Ljubljana, Yugoslavia (conflicting sources as to this conference taking place)*
- 1990: 11–13 April – Second Latin American Conference in Costa Rica
- 1990: 7–10 December – First Asian Lesbian Network (ALN) Conference in Bangkok, Thailand
- 1991: 21–25 March – ILIS Conference in Barcelona, Spain
- 1991: 28 August – First ILIS Zami Subgroup meeting in Amsterdam, the Netherlands
- 1992: 3–5 May – Second ALN Conference in Tokyo, Japan
- 1992: 14–16 August – Third Latin American Conference in Puerto Rico
- 1995: 11–15 August – Third ALN Conference in Wulai, Taiwan
- 1995: 4–15 September – ILIS at UN World Conference on Women in Beijing, China
- 1998: Final ILIS Newsletter

== See also ==
- Asian Lesbian Network
- European Lesbian* Conference
- List of LGBT rights organizations

== Bibliographic references ==
- Anderson, Shelley, Lesbian rights are human rights! Amsterdam: ILIS, 1995.
- Blasius, Mark (2001), Sexual Identities, Queer Politics. Princeton: Princeton University Press
- Compare EEIP report 1990. "HOSI Ausland EEIP Reports Regional konferenzen" with ILIS (misc.) Open Up pdf hardcopy *1058*. Both digitally available at IHLIA LGBT Heritage.* http://www.ihlia.nl/
- ILIS newsletters and minutes of meetings. Available at IHLIA LGBT Heritage.
- Zimmerman, Bonnie (2012). Lesbian Histories and Cultures: An Encyclopedia, Volume I. New York: Routledge.
