= LGBT Youth Scotland =

Scottish youth charity

- Formation: November 1989; 37 years ago
- Type: Scottish Charity
- VAT ID no.: 244805
- Registration no.: SC024047
- Headquarters: 3/2 30 Bell Street, Glasgow, Scotland, G1 1LG
- Coordinates: 55.974110°N 3.165870°W
- Region served: Scotland
- Chief Executive: Mhairi Crawford (2019–present)
- Revenue: £2.17 million (2023/24)
- Expenses: £2.012 million (2023/24)
- Staff: 42 (2019)
- Website: lgbtyouth.org.uk
- Formerly called: Stonewall Youth Project

LGBT Youth Scotland is a Scottish youth organisation dedicated to the inclusion of lesbian, gay, bisexual and transgender (LGBT) young people from 13 to 25 year of age in Scotland. It was established in November 1989 as the Stonewall Youth Project by members of the LGBT community in Edinburgh.

In April 2003 Stonewall Youth Project became a national organisation and was incorporated as a company limited by guarantee with charitable status under the name by which it is known today.

== History ==
LGBT Youth Scotland was originally founded in Edinburgh in 1989 as Stonewall Youth Project. In 2003 it was renamed as LGBT Youth Scotland and became a national organisation for young LGBT people.

== Organisation and funding ==
LGBT Youth Scotland is based in Edinburgh and also has offices in Glasgow and Dumfries.

The organisation is mainly funded by the state, with over £700,000 of its £1.2 million 2018-19 income coming from the Scottish Government, local councils and the National Health Service. Non-state donors include BBC Children in Need and the Big Lottery Fund. It employs 42 staff.

Since September 2019, the organisation has been led by chief executive Mhairi Crawford.

== Programmes ==
Services provided by LGBT Youth Scotland include: Direct Services for LGBT young people including support groups, advice and support, events and volunteering, National Projects including LGBT History Month, Policy work, Research, Training for Professionals. In November 2008, LGBT Youth Scotland began providing volunteering opportunities for those over the age of 26 as a part of the National Development Team's Capacity Building Project. Unlike many youth-steered organisations, LGBT Youth Scotland is not completely peer led, and relies upon experienced volunteers and paid staff to keep services running. The organisation is one of the largest employers in Scotland within the LGBT sector with over 30 full-time paid staff members, with many more part-time staff and volunteers.

LGBT young people are involved directly by their formation and support of Scotland's LGBT National Youth Council (NYC). The NYC is made up of elected youth representatives from all across Scotland, and is responsible for gathering the views, issues and aspirations of Scotland's LGBT youth population in order to feed them back to the people who can make a real difference, such as MSPs and local authorities. It brings together youth groups as well as individuals under one umbrella organisation. The service users elect two members of the Scottish Youth Parliament. In 2004 the youth volunteers of the organisation won the Philip Lawrence Award for Community Safety. LGBT Youth Scotland's Charter encourages and enables organisations and, since 2014, schools to proactively include LGBTI people in every aspect of their work - with the aim of protecting staff and demonstrating a commitment to the provision of high quality services to customers, students, and service users.

== Controversies ==
=== James Rennie ===
In May 2009, the Chief Executive Officer of LGBT Youth Scotland, James Rennie, was convicted on multiple charges related to child abuse and possession of indecent images of children, and was reported to have led the biggest paedophile network ever uncovered in Scotland. Following an 18-month investigation, Rennie was found guilty of 14 charges, including one of procuring his best friend’s child to be abused by other men, and was jailed for a minimum term of 13 years, subsequently reduced to eight and a half years on appeal. During the trial, it emerged that an email address set up by Rennie to carry out his criminal activities had been accessed from the offices of LGBT Youth Scotland; however, a police investigation found that Rennie's crimes had had no relation to or impact on the charity.

Rennie was appointed as the first Chief Executive Officer of LGBT Youth Scotland in 2003, having worked with the organisation since 1997. He remained in the post until 2008, when he was suspended following his arrest. Subsequent to Rennie's conviction, LGBT Youth Scotland dismissed him and issued a statement welcoming the verdict.

=== Other controversies ===
In 2022, allegations were made by two men who had accessed LGBT Youth Scotland's services as minors that they had been exposed to abuse as a result of the actions of the charity's employees. Among other claims, one of the men stated that he was given alcohol, cigarettes, and fake IDs by charity employees and taken to nightclubs, where nightclub patrons had offered him money for sex. In response to the allegations, LGBT Youth Scotland referred itself to Police Scotland and emphasised its commitment to supporting the police probe.

In 2024, LGBT Youth Scotland was sued over allegations that an unnamed complainant had been subjected to abuse as a result of the charity's negligence. A spokesperson for LGBT Youth Scotland declined to comment on the ongoing case.

Also in 2024, it was reported that a recently convicted paedophile and child abuser, Andrew Easton, had previously co-authored a children's guide to coming out for LGBT Youth Scotland in 2009. In response to the reports, LGBT Youth Scotland sought to clarify that Easton had neither been employed by the charity nor engaged as a volunteer at any point, and that the guide that Easton had co-authored was no longer in circulation.

In November 2024, the chair of the BBC's Children in Need charity, Rosie Millard, resigned in protest over an award of funding by Children in Need to LGBT Youth Scotland, citing safeguarding concerns and institutional failures of due diligence. LGBT Youth Scotland's chief executive, Mhairi Crawford, responded by accusing Millard of making "ideologically driven" attacks with "anti-inclusivity motives", and declared herself "pleased to see confirmation that Children in Need’s investigations into the work of LGBT Youth Scotland found nothing to report". However, a spokesman for Children in Need confirmed that it had conducted a three-month review of LGBT Youth Scotland after Millard had raised concerns, and had decided to withdraw the grant as a result.

== See also ==
- Equality Network
- LGBT Network
- Time for Inclusive Education
