= Asian Lesbian Network =

Lesbian organization

The Asian Lesbian Network was formed in March 1986 at the International Lesbian Information Service (ILIS) conference in Geneva, Switzerland, where lesbians from Bangladesh, India, the United States, Japan, and Thailand organized workshops during the conference.

The network has since hosted four international conferences. The first, organized by Anjaree, a Bangkok, Thailand, lesbian group, took place in Bangkok in 1990; the second conference happened in Tokyo, Japan, in May 1992, and was organized by the Japanese branch of the network.

Conference three took place in Wulai, Taipei, in August 1995, and the fourth occurred in Quezon City, Philippines, in 1998.

The network, which publishes the Asian Lesbian Network Newsletter, is intended to provide networking opportunities for Asian lesbians worldwide, as well as to contribute to an increased awareness of Asian Lesbians and their lives and their issues.
