= Peace Union of Finland =

Finnish peace organization

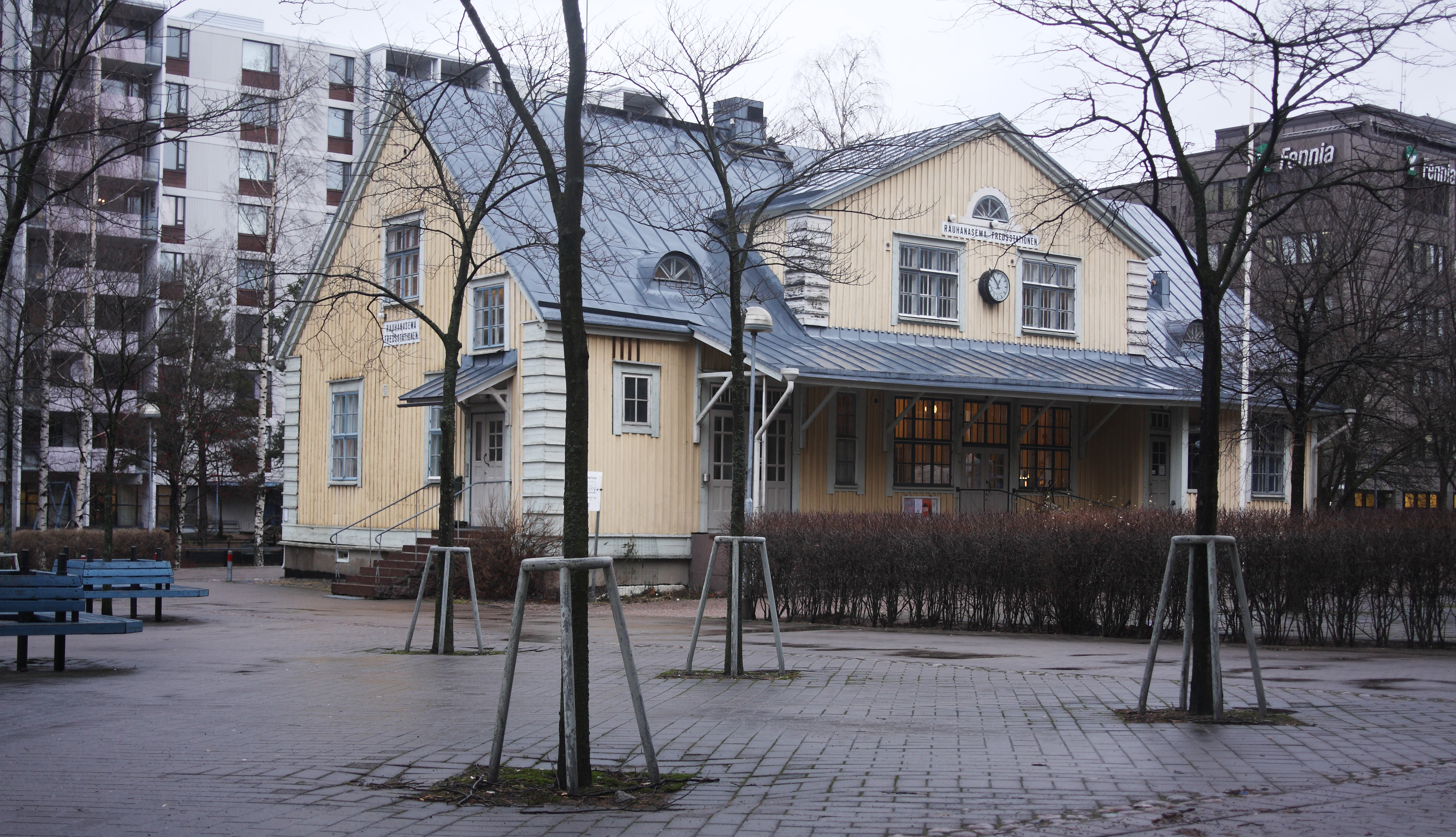
Rauhanasema or the "Peace Station" housing the headquarters of the Peace Union

The Peace Union of Finland (Finnish: Suomen Rauhanliitto, Swedish: Finlands Fredsförbund) is a Finnish organization in support of peace and disarmament. Representing the interests of several peace associations in Finland, it furthers its goals by lobbying Finnish and European authorities and acting as the Finnish member of the International Peace Bureau. The Peace Union was founded in 1920 although an organization with the same name existed from 1907 to 1913. Its headquarters are located in Pasila, Helsinki.
