= AGLA France =

LGBTQ organization

LGBT Advocacy Group
- Founded: 2001
- Founder: Micha Meroujean
- Dissolved: 2007
- Type: Association Loi 1901
- Purpose: Advocacy for LGBT Rights in Armenia
- Location: France
- Method: Networking, campaigning, advocacy, outreach, community media, TV, radio and internet
- Members: 40
- Key people: -
- Website: www.agla.info

AGLA France (Association des Gays et Lesbiennes Arméniens de France) (English: Association of Gay and Lesbian Armenians of France, Armenian: Ֆրանսահայ Միասեռականների Ասոցիացիա) was a Paris-based advocacy group working to fight widespread homophobia in Armenia and among Armenians in France from 2001 to 2007.

== Origins ==
Founded in December 2001 by gay refugees from Armenia, the group aimed at pressuring the Armenian government to remove its law against gay men, article 116 of the Armenian penal code.

== Actions ==
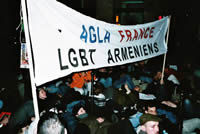
AGLA France members' sit in demonstration against hate crimes, Paris, circa February 2004

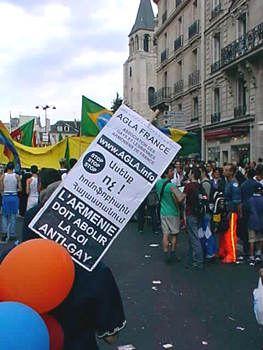
AGLA France at the Gay and Lesbian Pride march, Paris. Banner reads "Armenia must abolish the anti-gay law", circa June 2002

In May 2003 AGLA France launched "ThePink", the first LGBTQ online magazine in the Armenian language. By promoting public awareness on such issues as homophobia, coming out and HIV/STI prevention, AGLA sought to prepare the ground for the movement in favor of LGBT rights in Armenia.

In August 2003, President Robert Kocharyan ratified Armenia's new penal code which removes the former anti-gay article 116.

In late 2004, Armen Avetisyan, leader of Armenian Aryan Union (AAU), an ultra-nationalist Armenian political party, announced that some senior Armenian officials were gay. That prompted heated debates in parliament that were broadcast over the public TV channel. Some members of Armenian Parliament stated that any member found to be gay should resign.

AGLA France organized a protest to denounce the AAU's homophobic campaign and the denigration of gays by Armenian lawmakers and media outlets. AGLA France also picketed in front of the Armenian embassy in Paris. The association also wrote an open letter to the President of Armenia that was published a few days later in the newspaper "Haykakan Zhamanak".

In 2005, AGLA France invited two young men from Armenia to participate in ILGA-Europe's annual conference which was held in Paris. A year later Menq/WFCE, the first gay-operated NGO to fight HIV/AIDS, was registered in Yerevan.

In 2006, two members of AGLA France celebrated an informal wedding ceremony in the Etchmiadzin Cathedral (Holy See of the Armenian Apostolic Church). An article published in the newspaper 168 Zham (168 Hours) about this improvised marriage provoked a scandal and indignation at local conservative media outlets and among politicians and religious officials.

AGLA France ceased its activities in 2007.

== See also ==
- LGBT rights in Armenia
- Human rights in Armenia
- LGBT rights in Asia
- LGBT rights in France
