= Friðarbogin =

Faroese LGBT advocacy organization

Friðarbogin is an organization working for LGBT rights in the Faroe Islands.

Friðarbogin was founded in 2003.
