= Equality Network =

LGBTI rights organisation in Scotland

- Formation: 1997; 29 years ago
- Type: registered charity
- Purpose: Working for LGBTI equality and human rights in Scotland
- Location: Scotland
- Subsidiaries: Scottish Trans
- Website: www.equality-network.org

The Equality Network is one of Scotland's national organisations working for lesbian, gay, bisexual, transgender, and intersex LGBTI rights and equality. Established by LGBT activists in 1997, it is a registered charity (no. SC220213), and a company limited by guarantee based in Edinburgh. In 2024–25 it had an income of £612,000. Scottish Trans, Scotland's main national trans rights and equality project, is part of the Equality Network, having been established in 2007.

The Equality Network is a registered charity governed by a board of trustees. It has received funding various times from the following organisations: the Equality Unit of the Scottish Government, the Grundtvig Programme of the European Commission, the Equality and Human Rights Commission, the Big Lottery Fund and the Awards for All programme. It also receives donations from supporters across Scotland.

== History ==
The Equality Network was founded in 1997 as a national organisation working for LGBTI rights and equality in Scotland.

From 1969 to the mid-1990s, the main gay rights organisation in Scotland was Scottish Minorities Group, later called Scottish Homosexual Rights Group, and later still called Outright Scotland. By the late 1990s, Outright Scotland was mostly inactive. In late 1996, a number of Scottish activists came together to oppose proposed legislation that would have placed gay men on the sex offenders register in Scotland for minor 'offences' such as kissing in public. They successfully blocked this proposal.

By early 1997, it had become clear that Scotland might, if Labour won in the 1997 UK election, vote to establish a devolved Scottish Parliament. Pride Scotland, and some of the people involved in the sex offenders register campaign, organised a conference in June that year, to consider what that would mean for LGBT rights in Scotland. The conference decided that a new LGBT policy and campaign organisation was needed, and the Equality Network was founded.

For several years, the Equality Network was run by volunteers. From 2002, funding, initially from the Scottish Government, and then from other sources too, has allowed the organisation to employ staff. In 2007, funding allowed for the establishment of the Scottish Trans project within the Equality Network (initially called the Scottish Trans Alliance).

From 2016, the Equality Network expanded its remit to include equality for intersex people/people with variations in sex characteristics.

The Equality Network and Scottish Trans currently employ 14 staff (a mix of full- and part-time). It is a leading LGBTI policy and campaign organisation in Scotland, and provides community engagement and development, research, training and consultancy. It has a significant focus on intersectionality, including with disability and neurodivergence.

The Equality Network works in partnership with other LGBTI organisations in Scotland, such as LGBT Youth Scotland, LGBT Health and Wellbeing, Stonewall Scotland and more, as well as with other equality and human rights organisations in Scotland and the UK.

== Work ==
In 1998, a main focus for the Equality Network was campaigning around the arrangements for the new Scottish Parliament. Together with other equality organisations, it successfully called for the Parliament to have an Equal Opportunities Committee, and for the Scottish Government to have an Equality Unit, and for equal opportunities to be a founding principal of Scottish devolution.

In the run-up to the first Scottish Parliament election in May 1999, the Equality Network published a manifesto, "Equality at Holyrood".

=== Section 28 ===
Top of the manifesto calls for the repeal of 'section 28' (officially, section 2A of the Local Government Act 1986). This was the law introduced by Margaret Thatcher's UK government in 1988, which banned local councils from "the promotion of homosexuality", and banned the promotion in schools of "the acceptability of homosexuality as a pretended family relationship". Section 28 had had a big effect on holding back acceptance of LGBT people.

In May 1999, in the first Scottish Parliament election, the people of Scotland elected a Labour/Liberal Democrat coalition Scottish Government. In October 1999, the Communities Minister, Wendy Alexander, announced that the government would repeal section 28. There was a backlash in some of the media, and in January 2000, one of Scotland's richest businessmen, Brian Souter, announced that he would be funding a "Keep the Clause" campaign to stop the repeal. He spent over £1 million on the campaign, including adverts all over the media and on billboards across Scotland. But the government continued with the repeal proposal, and on 21 June 2000, the Scottish Parliament voted by 99 votes to 17 to repeal section 28.

== Scottish Trans ==
Scottish Trans is a trans-specific project within the Equality Network to "improve gender identity and gender reassignment equality, rights and inclusion in Scotland". Scottish Trans has three full-time staff working for the Equality Network, Vic Valentine is manager of the group, a position previously held by James Morton, the author of A Scottish History of Trans Equality Activism.

== Awards ==
The Equality Network won the Campaign of the Year Award at the Herald Society Awards 2012, and Campaign of the Year at the LGBT Youth Scotland Awards 2012, both for the Equal Marriage campaign — the UK's first campaign for same-sex marriage rights, established by the Equality Network in 2008. It was also shortlisted for Public Campaign of the Year at the Scottish Politician of the Year Awards 2012.

== See also ==
- LGBTQ rights in Scotland
- Community Development Alliance Scotland
- Pride Scotia

Other national LGBTQ organisations:

- LGBT Youth Scotland
- LGBT Network
- Time for Inclusive Education

Other national organisations with a substantial LGBTQ remit:

- Equality and Human Rights Commission
- Scottish Trades Union Congress
