= LGBT Network =

Scottish LGBTQ rights charity

LGBT Network Logo

The LGBT Network was an LGBT rights charity based in Scotland.

The LGBT Network was founded as a not for profit organisation in April 2008 and operated throughout Europe and was credited with launching a petition for same-sex marriage at the Scottish Parliament in January 2009.

The Chairperson of the LGBT Network was Rob McDowall, who is Director of SIACC, Board Member of Partners in Advocacy and a member of the Equality Council.

McDowall launched a petition in 2008 calling on the Scottish Parliament to lift the ban on gay and bisexual men donating blood. The petition received high level support from Ross Finnie MSP, Alyn Smith MEP and Struan Stevenson MEP.
