= Andrew Moffat =

British primary school teacher and author

Andrew Moffat MBE
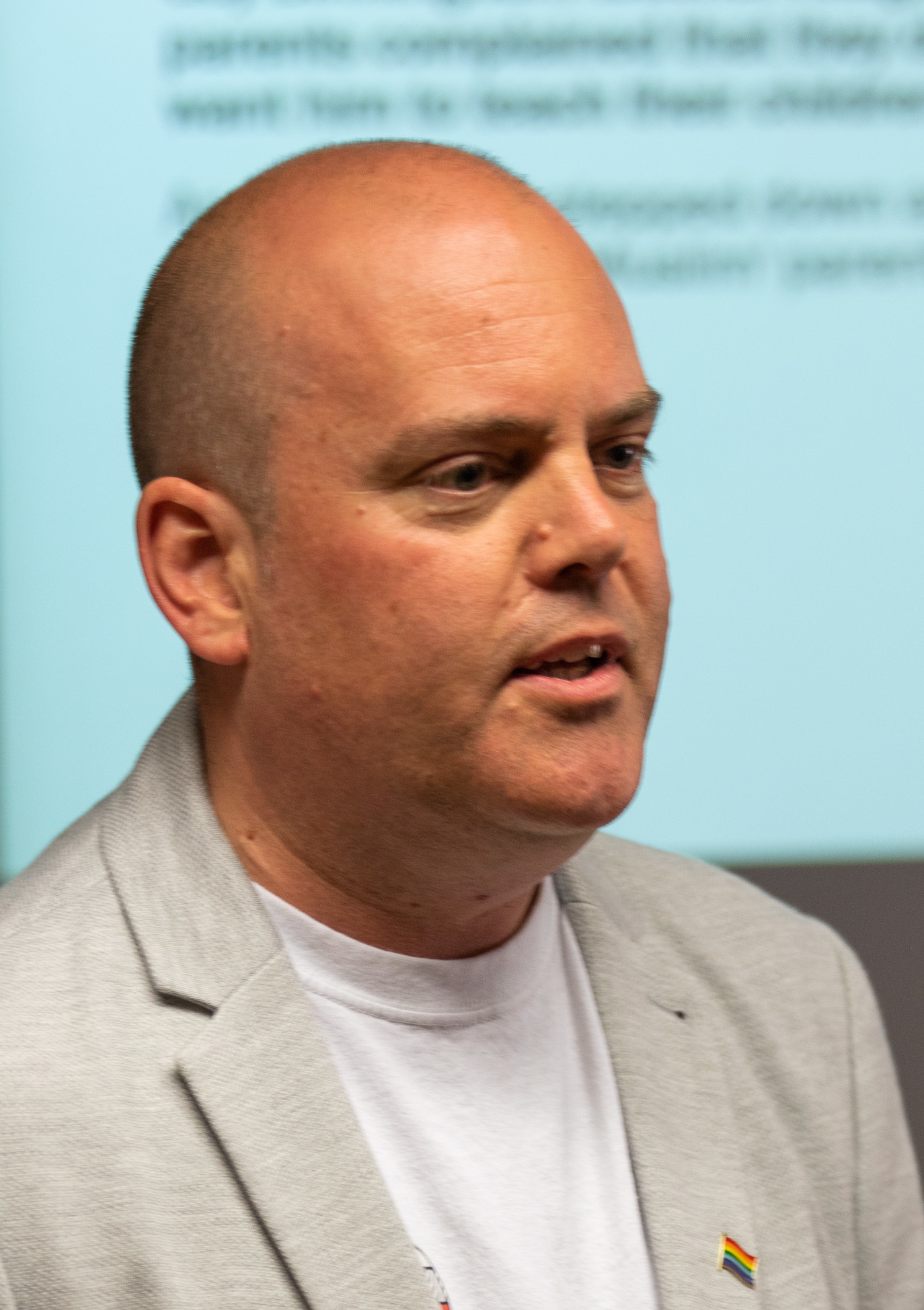
- Born: 1972 (age 53–54)
- Education: John Willmott School, Sutton Coldfield, Josiah Mason College
- Alma mater: University of Derby: BA (1993), University of Birmingham: MA (2003) and PhD (to present)
- Occupations: Teacher, author
- Known for: No Outsiders education programme
- Website: no-outsiders.com

Andrew Moffat MBE (born 1972) is a British teacher at Parkfield Community School in Birmingham, and the author of several books and educational resources, including the No Outsiders programme, an approach to teaching primary school-aged children about diversity and tolerance, for which he was nominated for the Global Teacher Prize. His programme has attracted protests on religious grounds, and was briefly halted in 2019, before being reinstated. Moffat was awarded an MBE in 2017 for services to equality in education.

== Early life and education ==
Moffat has described growing up in 80s Britain as characterised by homophobic bullying, and said, "School was brutal really in the eighties...Virtually every gay person [who grew up in the era has] the same story about being bullied".

Moffat attended John Willmott School, Sutton Coldfield, until 1988 and Josiah Mason College until 1990. He received a BA in English with drama and American Studies from the University of Derby in 1993, followed by a Postgraduate Certificate in Education, also from Derby. He was later awarded an MA in emotional and behavioural difficulties from the University of Birmingham. As of 2019 he is studying for a PhD entitled The role of schools in reducing potential for radicalisation.

== Teaching career ==
Early in his career Moffat worked with challenging youths in the West Midlands including those involved in gang culture. He worked as a teacher and schools advisor in several schools before becoming an assistant head teacher at a Birmingham primary school, Chilwell Croft Academy in 2009. Moffat was also responsible for training primary school teachers on how to manage homophobic bullying, using resources, some of which he had written while a teacher, including Challenging Homophobia In Primary Schools: An early years resource (2007), later published as Challenging Homophobia In Primary Schools (CHIPS) (2012). While teaching a series of lessons about tolerance for people of different sexual orientations in 2014, the school received a complaint from a "Christian parent" objecting to the material and content of the lessons. There followed a meeting with 40 parents, mostly Christian and Muslim, at which some parents reportedly complained they were not happy that their children "learn that it's OK to be gay". As a result of the meeting, Moffat resigned. In a statement, the school said, "The...objections were primarily voiced by those whose own religion took an opposing stance to homosexuality." Moffat has stated that the objections surfaced after he came out publicly as gay in a school assembly.

Shortly after, he took a position at another primary school, Parkfield Community School, an academy also in the Birmingham area, as a Personal Social Health Education (PSHE) teacher and assistant head teacher. It was at Parkfield where he first implemented his No Outsiders programme on inclusivity and tolerance for children in primary schools. The programme does not address sex or sex education.

Following the Charlie Hebdo terrorist attack, and in response to his school children's questions, Moffat put together online resources for teachers covering terrorism and hate crime, particularly concerning refugees.

In 2016, Parkfield School, where he was at the time assistant head teacher, was rated as "outstanding" by Ofsted, and particular mention given to "the provision for pupils' spiritual, moral, social and cultural development is a strength and permeates the school's work. This is an inclusive school that celebrates diversity." Moffat also has responsibility for pastoral care of pupils and teachers within the school.

In 2017 Moffat was given an MBE "for services to equality and diversity in education".

In June 2019, Moffat, along with seven other prominent school leaders, presented a parliamentary briefing on behalf of the National Association of Head Teachers, entitled Relationships Education, Relationships and Sex Education (RSE) and Health Education. The presentation in Westminster and accompanying document advised parliament on current policy, and asked for clarity and support in providing education around the Equality Act 2010's protected characteristics.

The same year, Moffat was a finalist for the Global Teacher Prize from the Varkey Foundation.

== No Outsiders ==
Moffat began to design the No Outsiders programme of learning prior to becoming assistant head teacher at Parkfield Community School, an academy school in Birmingham, UK. The programme addresses issues of inclusion, and covers topics which are protected by the Equality Act 2010, including religion or belief system, race, gender reassignment and sex, not sexual orientation. Age-appropriate books are used as part of the programme to illustrate key concepts, such as Odd Dog Out by Children's Book Prize winner Rob Biddulph which covers inclusion, Stonewall Book Award winner Julián Is a Mermaid by Jessica Love which looks at diversity and gender roles, and And Tango Makes Three by Peter Parnell and Justin Richardson which looks at same-sex marriage and parenting.

The programme attracted criticism and protest at the school from a vocal minority of parents when it was introduced. The school has a 98% majority of children with Muslim parents, and the protestors objected principally on the grounds that they did not want their children to be taught about LGBT issues. In 2019, following Moffat's nomination for the Global Teacher Prize from the Varkey Foundation, protests grew and spread to other schools in the area. Following continuing protests, the programme was temporarily halted at these schools in March 2019, whilst a resolution with parents and guardians was sought. Moffat, as an openly gay staff member, was advised by the police to do a risk assessment of his travel arrangements from school.

Following five months of consultation, the programme restarted in September 2019, entitled "No Outsiders for a Faith Community", and included year group consultations with parents in advance of the lessons starting. Despite Ofsted having assessed the programme as age-appropriate, objections from some parents and calls for him to be dismissed continued.

In 2019, Birmingham City Council applied to the High Court for an injunction to create an exclusion zone to protect the schools from organised protests following an investigation by the Commission for Countering Extremism which revealed the protests had been taken over by Hizb ut-Tahir and other pro-Islamist groups, unconnected to either school, with a specific aim to "entrench social division" and "amplify hate" against LGBT people. The judge, Justice Warby upheld a permanent exclusion to the groups, and stated they had deliberately "grossly misinterpreted" the programme by suggesting it promoted paedophilia, which was not true."

Moffat also runs an after-school club called Parkfield Ambassadors. Here, children learn more about the programme and visit other local schools to tell pupils about it. One aim of the club is to make connections between school children and reduce the risk of radicalisation in vulnerable groups.

As of 2019, Moffat is CEO of No Outsiders, a charity which describes its mission as one which "prepares young people and adults for life as global citizens, reducing potential for terrorism and promoting community cohesion."

In 2020, the school announced Moffat had taken on a development lead position across the academy trust, in order to train more teachers to deliver the No Outsiders programme. He has also assumed responsibility for delivering the Right Respecting Schools programme, a UNICEF initiative which ensures a safe learning environment based on children's rights.

In April 2020, Moffat released a second book, No Outsiders: Everyone Different, Everyone Welcome, an updated book about the programme.

== Personal life ==
Moffat describes teaching as "the best job in the world" and "an honour". He is openly gay and has received threatening emails and abuse because of his sexuality throughout the protests. He did not come out to his family until he was 27.

In May 2019, Moffat led Birmingham Pride along with LGBT Muslims Saima Razzaq and Khakan Qureshi.

Moffat also speaks as a children's rights communicator, and has presented at the Humanists UK 2019 convention, and the 2019 Blackham lecture with Sarah Hewitt-Clarkson.

Moffat entered into a civil partnership in 2006.

== Publications ==
- Behaviour, safety and well being : 100+ lesson plans for the primary classroom (2007)
- Emotional Literacy: A Scheme of Work for Primary School (2008)
- Challenging homophobia in primary schools (2013)
- No Outsiders in Our School: Teaching the Equality Act in Primary Schools (Speechmark Practical Resources) (2015)
- Reclaiming Radical Ideas in Schools: Preparing Young Children for Life in Modern Britain (2017)
- No Outsiders: Everyone Different, Everyone Welcome (2020)

== See also ==
- Anderton Park Primary School
- Education and the LGBT community
- Section 28
