= Saima Razzaq =

British human rights campaigner

- Born: Saima Razzaq; Birmingham, England
- Occupations: Political activist and educator

Saima Razzaq is a British political activist and educator, co-chair of SEEDS (Supporting the Education of Equality in Schools) and Head of Diversity and Inclusion for Birmingham Pride. Razzaq actively campaigns for LGBT inclusive education in schools and was the first Muslim woman to lead a Pride parade in Britain.

== Early life and education ==
Razzaq was born in Britain and raised in Small Heath in Birmingham. She is of Pakistani heritage. Her family moved from India to Pakistan before partition, then migrated to the United Kingdom in the 1970s from Kashmir.

== Career ==
Razzaq is a former BBC producer, music journalist and former Head of Digital, Marketing and Communications at Fair for You. She also previously worked as Head of Content Marketing and Social Media at HomeServe.

== Political activism ==
Razzaq is well known for her activism on race, gender, racism and LGBT+ rights in the United Kingdom. She is a founding member and co-chair of SEEDS (Supporting the Education of Equality in Schools), which was formed by teachers as a 1,000-member network in response to protests against LGBT inclusive education outside schools in Birmingham, specifically the No Outsiders programme created by school teacher Andrew Moffat. The group is dedicated to promoting the education of equality and diversity in schools, including LGBT+ inclusive education throughout primary and secondary school.

During the Anderton Park Primary School protests in 2019, Razzaq was a mediator between teachers, parent groups and the city's LGBT community, working to challenge both homophobia and Islamophobia. She said that “as a Pakistani Muslim I do often feel caught in the middle of two conflicting communities. As much as inherent homophobia and transphobia exists within my community we must also recognise the inherent racism within LGBTQI community." She also said she felt uncomfortable with the media creating a “them and us” narrative which demonised her community for holding prejudicial views that existed in wider British society.

She also claimed the voices of Muslim women were "being lost", saying "women need to and should be at the forefront of the conversation on gender and sexuality in an Islamic context. Our bodies and our sexuality need to be defined by our voices."

In April 2019, Razzaq called out and met with Labour MP John Spellar after he was one of only 21 Members of Parliament to vote against the government's new LGBT-inclusive guidance for compulsory relationships and sex education. The intervention led to Spellar reversing his opposition to the measures. In June 2019, she challenged Labour MP Roger Godsiff's support of anti-LGBT school protests. Godsiff was subsequently reported to the party whip, deselected and lost his Birmingham Hall Green parliamentary seat during the 2019 United Kingdom General Election.

In May 2019, Razzaq jointly led Birmingham Pride alongside Moffat and several LGBT Muslims, making her the first Muslim woman to lead a Pride parade in the UK. The event was also the first time Muslims had led a Pride parade in Britain.

In June 2019, she spoke at a 'Defending Equality' event organised by Southall Black Sisters and Feminist Dissent, alongside Jess Phillips MP, Khakan Qureshi, Sarah Hewitt-Clarkson and Stephen Cowden to show solidarity with schools affected by anti-LGBT protests.

In July 2020, Razzaq criticised the 2022 Commonwealth Games describing the event as a "PR stunt" which is "steeped in colonialism" and a "waste of money". However, in August 2022, she told The Guardian she had a "complicated relationship" with the Commonwealth but acknowledged the Games were "exciting".

Razzaq has voiced her support for decolonising the national curriculum and LGBT spaces to make them more inclusive. She has praised UK Black Pride as a model for LGBT events. In August 2021, she was appointed Head of Diversity and Inclusion for Birmingham Pride.

In August 2021, she chaired the Soap Box event as part of Ikon Gallery's annual Migrant Festival to mark Refugee Week and World Refugee Day.

In October 2021, Razzaq spoke out against an increased number of homophobic attacks in Birmingham, and continues to campaign against hate crime. In response to hate crime incidents, Razzaq co-founded Brum Against Hate with activists Adam Yosef and Salman Mirza, organising protests demanding safer spaces for the LGBT community.

In February 2022, a guest speaker lecture by Razzaq at the University of Birmingham was reportedly cancelled by senior members of the university after she asked for a change of venue, so as not to cross the picket line in solidarity with striking academic staff. She was due to give a lecture on intersectionality, inclusivity and diversity as an official representative of Birmingham Pride during LGBT History Month but was unable to do so. It was later rescheduled by the university.

== Personal life ==
Razzaq is openly lesbian and is critical of parents who do not support their child's sexuality. She did not come out to her family until she was 29. She is a Muslim.

== Recognition ==
- In June 2020, Razzaq was featured on billboards across the UK as part of a 'Pride Inside' campaign to mark Pride Month.
- In September 2020, Razzaq was awarded an 'LGBTQ+ Community Outstanding Achievement' honorary award by Midlands Zone magazine for her work advocating equality.

== Filmography ==
- My God, I'm Queer! (2020) – Directed by Matt Mahmood-Ogston
- Lesbian (2021) – Directed by Rosemary Baker
