= Time for Inclusive Education =

Scottish LGBTQ charity

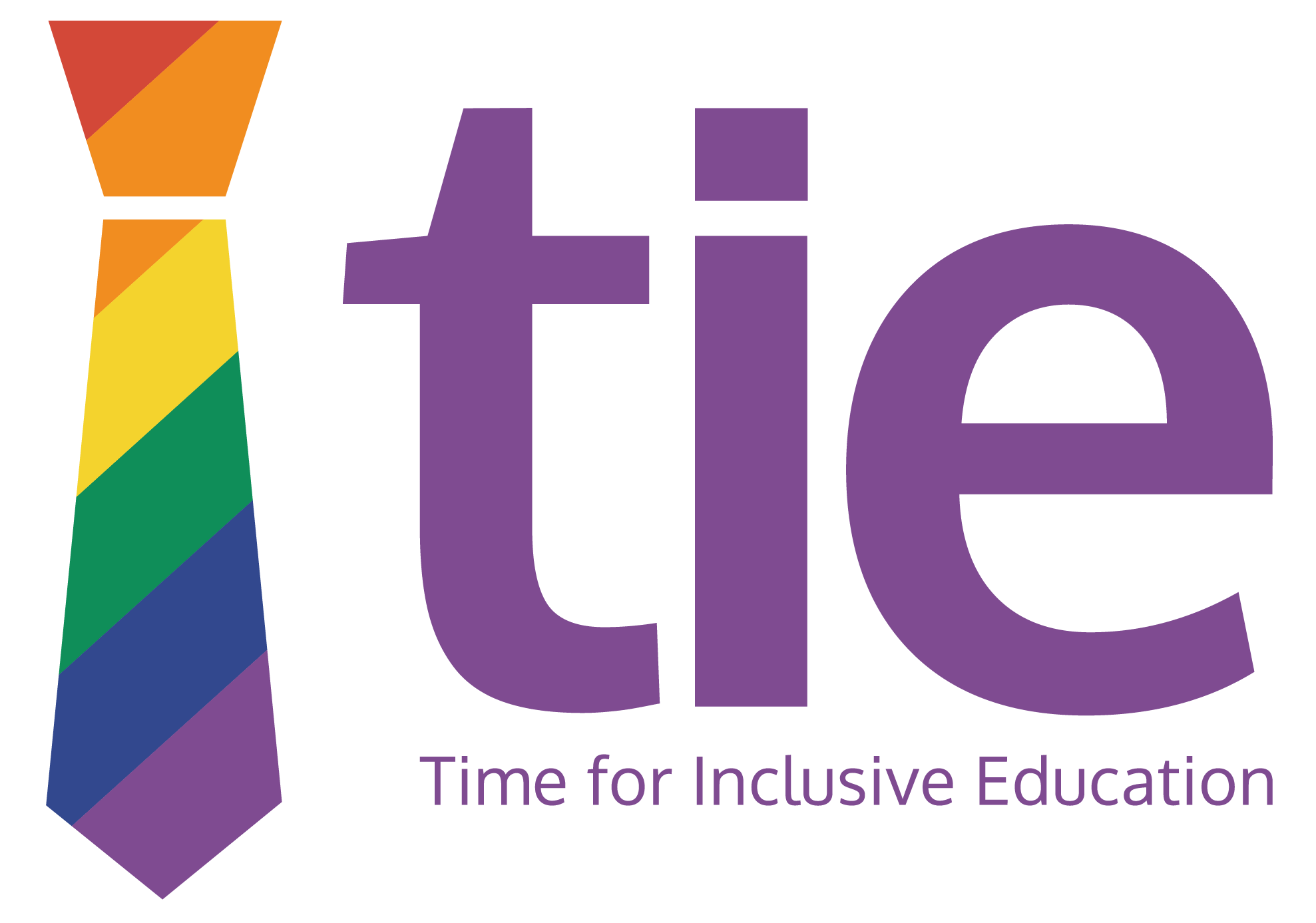
- Time for Inclusive Education logo
- Abbreviation: TIE
- Formation: 28 June 2015; 11 years ago
- Founders: Jordan Daly; Liam Stevenson
- Type: Charity
- Purpose: LGBT rights
- Region served: Scotland
- Website: www.tie.scot

Time for Inclusive Education (TIE) is a charity addressing prejudice with education in Scotland’s schools. It delivers services for teachers and pupils, including education initiatives designed to address and prevent homophobic bullying, and to counter the effect of disinformation and online hate in schools. The charity is overseen by a Board, employs teachers, and works in schools across Scotland. Their advocacy and campaigning led to Scotland becoming the first country in the world to introduce LGBT-inclusive teaching in schools to reduce prejudice and bullying. Its patron is Scottish comedian Susie McCabe. Its work has been internationally recognised, and commended by the Council of Europe and the United Nations. In 2025, the charity partnered with the Institute for Strategic Dialogue in Germany to develop bespoke educational responses to online hate, disinformation, and far-right extremism through its Digital Discourse Initiative project.

Beginning as a campaign, TIE initially put their case to the public petitions committee of the Scottish Parliament, however, despite finding some support their petition was rejected in January 2016. They were successful in achieving their aims in 2018 when The Scottish Government announced its intention to introduce LGBT-inclusive education in all state schools.

TIE have received the backing of leading Scottish political figures, including Nicola Sturgeon, Patrick Harvie, Kezia Dugdale and Mhairi Black. At their 2016 Spring conference, the Scottish National Party moved a resolution to support the campaign and, during the 2016 Scottish Parliament election, all major parties adopted the group's calls for improved teacher training in their election manifestoes. TIE has the support of the Scottish Parliament, after a majority of MSPs signed the group's campaign pledge and committed to supporting their strategic proposals to advance LGBT inclusive education. In 2017, the Scottish Government formed an LGBTI Inclusive Education Working Group with TIE to consider policy recommendations to address the issues the campaign had raised, leading to the adoption of LGBT-inclusive education. TIE was shortlisted for Public Campaign of the Year at the 2016 Scottish Politician of the Year awards, won Charity of the Year at the 2017 Icon Awards and 2019 Shelia McKechnie Foundation Awards, won Public Service Award at the Proud Scotland Awards in 2020, and was a finalist for Community Organisation of the Year at the National Diversity Awards in 2021.

TIE succeeded in achieving its campaign aims in November 2018, when The Scottish Government announced that the recommendations of its LGBTI Inclusive Education Working Group had been accepted in full, and that LGBT themes would be embedded into the national curriculum in all public schools. The charity's education work is currently ongoing, with its founders expressing that their work will not be over "until we live in a society where we are no longer required".

In 2025, TIE partnered with the global think tank Institute for Strategic Dialogue in Germany to launch the Digital Discourse Initiative project, providing schools in Scotland with strategies to challenge the effects of online hate and disinformation on young people.

The Educational Institute of Scotland (EIS), NASUWT and Scottish Trades Union Congress have affiliated to the charity.

In 2026, Jordan and Liam were awarded Honorary Fellowships of the Educational Institute of Scotland (EIS), the highest honour conferred by Scotland’s largest education union.

== History ==
Time for Inclusive Education (TIE) was co-founded by Scottish campaigners Jordan Daly and Liam Stevenson, after the pair met following the Scottish independence referendum. It was launched on 28 June 2015, the 46th anniversary of the Stonewall riots, with assistance from Jimmy Reid Foundation project Common Weal.

On 5 August 2015, Daly submitted an online petition to the Scottish Parliament on behalf of TIE, calling for the statutory inclusion of LGBTQ issues within all school curricula. On 27 October 2015, campaigners appeared before the Scottish Parliament's Public Petitions Committee to give evidence to MSPs. TIE proposed that every school have a teacher trained in how to teach LGBT issues. The committee agreed to write to the Scottish Government and relevant educational institutions, including the Educational Institute of Scotland and Convention of Scottish Local Authorities. The committee showed interest towards the proposals.

In September 2016 TIE launched an online pledge, calling on members of the public and MSPs to sign their support for a five-point national strategy towards achieving LGBT inclusivity in schools. Among the proposals were calls for new legislation for LGBT inclusive education in all schools, teacher training and the recording of all incidents of homophobic, biphobic and transphobic bullying by Scottish local authorities. Many parliamentarians immediately signed the pledge, and this led to an increased focus on the topic.

In November 2016, Daly represented TIE and gave evidence during a scoping session into bullying in schools for the Scottish Parliament's Equalities and Human Rights Committee. He argued that the human rights of LGBT young people are being breached in Scottish schools and that under the Equality Act 2010's Public Sector Duties, all publicly funded bodies are required to be proactive in eliminating prejudice and discrimination against protected characteristics, and so schools should be doing more to address homophobic bullying. He concluded by urging the Committee's MSPs to move the group's proposals forward in order to advance the human rights of LGBT school pupils.

In December 2016, human rights lawyer Aamer Anwar – a vocal supporter of TIE – urged the Scottish Government to implement the group's proposals in order to "save lives", stating that "as long as young Scots continue to take their own lives because of their sexuality, then equality will remain a soundbite and sexual apartheid the reality." He also addressed the debate as to whether LGBT education should be implemented in Scotland's faith schools, expressing concerns that faith schools having the option to opt-out of delivering LGBT guidance was a political decision. He stated that if TIE's proposals were to be adopted then they "must include religious schools, as there can be no opt out - no matter how politically inconvenient it may be."

As of February 2017, sixty-seven MSPs had signed TIE's campaign pledge to commit their support to the group's strategic proposals to achieve LGBT inclusive education. This marked a cross-party parliamentary majority in support of the campaign, placing the Scottish Parliament as the first in Europe to express majority support for the teaching of LGBT issues in schools.

A second motion in support of the proposals outlined in TIE's pledge, and the formation of a working group with TIE representatives, was debated at the SNP's Spring Conference in March 2017 and passed with acclaim, having been supported by senior party politicians including Christina McKelvie and Jenny Gilruth.

== Aims ==
TIE's campaigners claimed that the lack of LGBT education in Scottish schools was a "national disgrace", holding that "education is an absolutely vital tool to tackle homophobia, biphobic and transphobic behaviours, and discrimination, and it must be utilised." It lists its primary aim as ensuring that all Scottish schools offer an education that is inclusive of LGBT topics, and outlined various methods to achieve this in its campaign pledge.

TIE have argued that LGBT specific teacher training should be made available to all Scottish schools - including faith schools - and urged parties to commit to this during the 2016 Scottish parliamentary election period, claiming that: "it is vital that the next strategy to tackle LGBT-phobia in Scottish schools is the right one - for too long we have dealt with a Section 28 hangover, the next Scottish Government must tackle this properly."

== Support ==
The campaign has gained cross party political support as well as endorsements from public figures across Scotland and internationally; including Nicola Sturgeon, Scottish Education Minister John Swinney, Welsh international rugby union referee Nigel Owens, CEO of Ditch the Label, Liam Hackett, human rights lawyer Aamer Anwar, former Secretary of State for Scotland David Mundell, journalist Owen Jones, former Labour Party leader Jeremy Corbyn, actress Emma Thompson, American activist Alicia Garza, Patrick Harvie, Willie Rennie, Kezia Dugdale, Pat Nevin, David Torrance (journalist), Jonathon Shafi and Cat Boyd.

The campaign has received the backing of the Scottish National Party's affiliated youth organisations, the Young Scots for Independence (SNP Youth) and Federation of Student Nationalists (SNP Students). Speaking after the decision was made, Rhiannon Spear - convenor of SNP Youth - claimed that "...the TIE campaign's values are directly in line with those of the Young Scots for Independence (SNP Youth), and we have made a commitment to campaign against all forms of discrimination and prejudice."

At their Spring conference in March 2016, the Scottish National Party moved a resolution from SNP Youth and SNP Students in support of TIE and the campaign's calls for inclusive LGBT education. Youth delegates spoke personally, all of whom cited statistics in the area which highlight higher rates of suicide and self-harm amongst LGBT school pupils. As a result, the party has committed to working with TIE to improve LGBT inclusivity within the Scottish education system. TIE's campaigners called the move "historic".

In March 2016, actress Emma Thompson backed the campaign.

First Minister of Scotland, Nicola Sturgeon, expressed her support for TIE during the 2016 Scottish Parliament election campaign, stating that the group's work was "very impressive" and vowing to work with the campaigners during her current term in government.

In April 2016, the Scottish Green Party launched an LGBT manifesto, in which they expressed their support for TIE, and committed to pushing for many of the campaign's aims within the Scottish parliament - including LGBT specific teacher training.

The former Children and Young People's Commissioner Scotland, Tam Baillie, has also supported TIE's aims. He publicly backed the campaign in October 2016, arguing that the issues that had been raised by the campaigners regarding homophobic bullying in schools should be "addressed by the Scottish Government and education providers to ensure we live up to our international rights obligations and to create school communities based on equality and respect for all." His successor, Bruce Adamson, has also supported the campaign and has strongly advocated the group's calls for legislation on LGBT inclusivity in schools.

Columnist and author Owen Jones has also endorsed the campaign, insisting that "being exposed to homophobia, biphobia and transphobia at a young age can be damaging to LGBTI people for the rest of their lives".

Secretary of State for Scotland, David Mundell, has also endorsed the group's calls. In December 2016, he stated that while he was accepted when he came out as gay earlier in the year, he is aware that there are "many LGBTI young people" who are being bullied at school. He agreed with the group's proposals for inclusive education, arguing that they should be implemented "to tackle prejudice and spread understanding in our schools, giving LGBTI young people equality and respect, which is their right."

The former leader of the Labour Party, Jeremy Corbyn, has supported the charity along with the leader of the Scottish Labour Party, Richard Leonard.

In late 2017, the charity's work was endorsed by the National Parent Forum of Scotland and Scouts Scotland.

On 28 June 2018, as part of a stunt to mark TIE's third anniversary, MSPs from all parties wore custom made rainbow ties in the style of the charity's recognisable logo in the Scottish Parliament's debating chamber during First Minister's Questions.

== Trade union support ==
In February 2016, UNISON became the first trade union to officially back the campaign following a speech from Daly at the union's Scottish council conference. Delegates pledged their continued support and gave a financial donation of £1000 - which TIE stated would be used to directly train groups of teaching staff in how to tackle LGBT-phobic behaviours and attitudes in their schools.

Following this, the Scottish Trades Union Congress, which represents 39 affiliated trade unions and around 630,000 trade unionists, unanimously voted to endorse TIE. Willie Docherty of UNISON spoke in support of the campaign, stating: "A real education can only be in place when young people can be themselves and not have to worry about being bullied, ridiculed or just ignored because of who they are."

In June 2017 the Educational Institute of Scotland, the country's largest teacher's trade union, voted to affiliate to TIE. In doing so, the union adopted the group's proposals and officially supported the campaign.

== 2015: Response to Public Petition ==
Scottish LGBT organisations have expressed their support for TIE's aims, with LGBT Youth Scotland writing to the Scottish Parliament's petitions committee, outlining that: "Improvements in LGBT students’ educational experiences have not been consistent within Scottish schools and there are still high levels of prejudice and exclusion."

Stonewall Scotland, in their written response, outlined their support for improved teacher training, holding that: "We would agree with the TIE campaign that there is significant inconsistency in the approach schools and local authorities take to addressing LGBT issues. Whilst we are delighted to see more schools addressing LGBT issues in a proactive way, they must be the rule and not the exception. We would welcome a clear strategy from the Scottish Government as to how they will systematically address the bullying and lack of support and experienced by LGBT young people in Scotland."

The Convention of Scottish Local Authorities (COSLA), whilst in agreement that teachers must have knowledge of equalities issues, expressed concern regarding teacher training: outlining that "...this is a busy time for trainee teachers and that there are lots of other demands on their time", and that a teacher's understanding of human rights issues is "...likely to be gained and kept updated through information provided by their schools and through career-long professional learning."

The teachers' union, Educational Institute of Scotland, furthered this argument in their response: "...the EIS is of the view that practitioners are skilled in identifying their own professional learning needs." Following their submission - which expressed concerns for the rights of religious parents and teachers - the EIS came under scrutiny on social media from many of its own members, leading the union to publish a clarification of their position, outlining that they "share the concerns of TIE".

The Scottish Government responded to TIE's calls, stating that: "The Scottish Government is clear that there is no place in Scotland for prejudice or discrimination, and that everyone deserves to be treated fairly regardless of age, disability, gender, gender identity, pregnancy and maternity, race, religion or sexual orientation. We must continue, unrelentingly, to tackle prejudice and discrimination and promote equality and diversity; and we must begin this work early in schools." They outlined that they have taken specific action to tackle homophobic bullying in the past, with the creation of a teaching toolkit - and claimed that their next steps in tackling this would be to assess whether the current toolkit should be updated to provide teachers with the confidence to tackle homophobic bullying after the revised National Approach is published in 2016.

== 2016: Rejection of Public Petition ==
On 12 January 2016, the petition put forward by TIE was unanimously rejected by the Public Petitions Committee. Ministers expressed sympathy with the campaign. Then committee Convener Michael McMahon explained that the petition called for LGBT education to be engrained in statute, and that the school curricula are not statutory, with the exception of Religious and Moral Education.

== 2016: Glasgow Pride Partnership ==
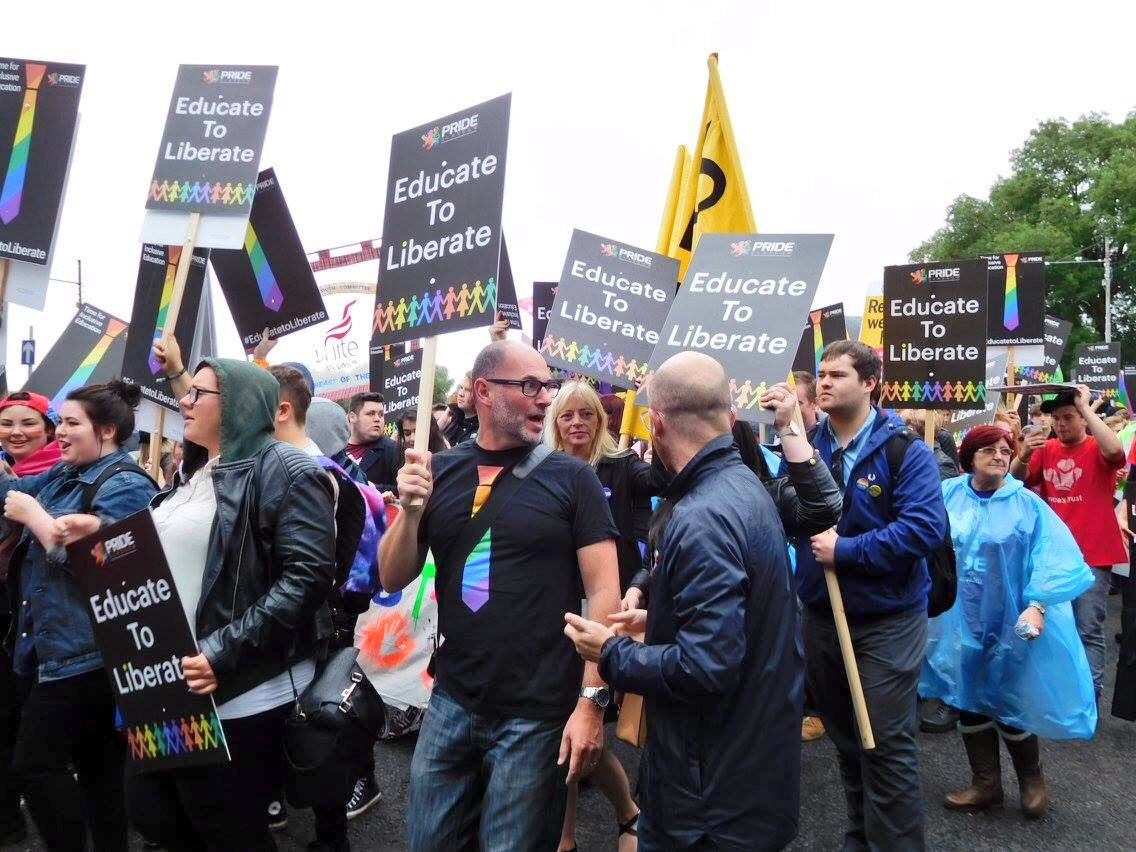
TIE Campaign march at Pride Glasgow

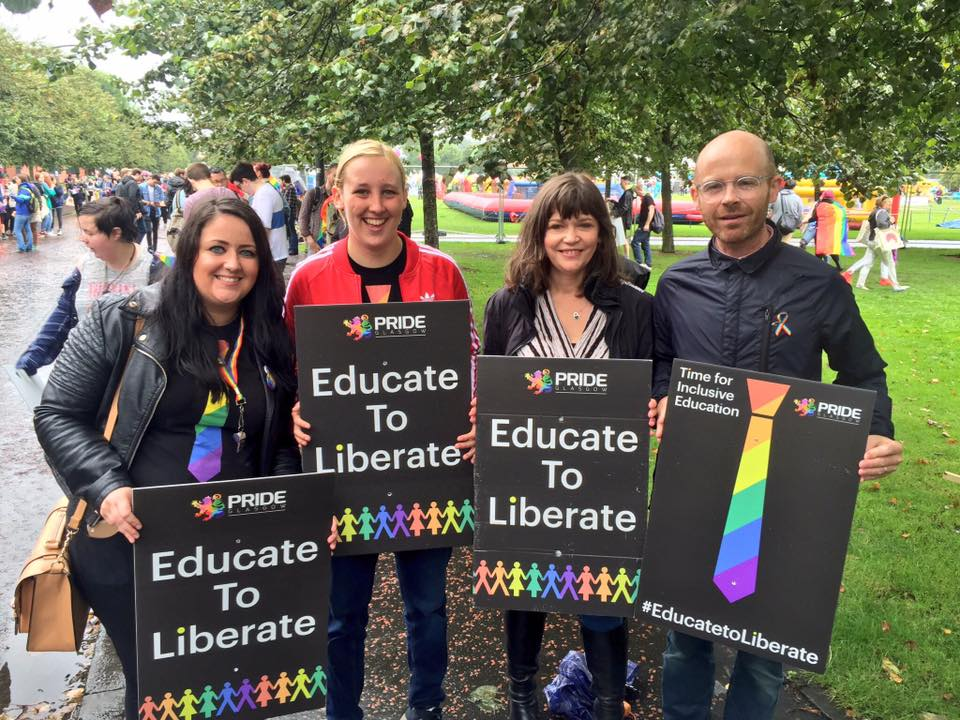
SNP MPs supporting TIE Campaign at Pride Glasgow in 2016

In May 2016, it was announced that Pride Glasgow had partnered with TIE for the city's annual Gay pride parade, which would be themed around the campaign. The move was praised for its political significance by campaigners.

== 2016: Hate crime incident ==
In August 2016, it was reported that four teenagers were arrested and charged in connection with an incident of homophobic abuse in West Lothian. Footage was being filmed for a documentary about TIE, with LGBT young people speaking about their experiences of being bullied at school, when they were interrupted by the perpetrators who began "screaming homophobic abuse" at them. The case was resolved by the Scottish Children's Reporter Administration.

== 2017: Scottish Parliament majority ==
In February 2017 sixty seven Members of the Scottish Parliament had signed TIE's campaign pledge, committing their support to the group's strategic proposals for LGBT inclusive education - including teacher training, legislation and curricular inclusion. The move places the Scottish Parliament as the first in the world to indicate majority support for the teaching of LGBT issues in schools. Speaking at the time, a TIE spokesperson stated that "It is important to recognise that this parliamentary mandate for our calls is a historical moment in the push for equal rights in Scotland", while Scottish Conservative MSP Ross Thomson claimed that "TIE have put the issue of LGBTI-inclusive education firmly to the top of the political agenda." Former party leaders Richard Leonard, Patrick Harvie and Willie Rennie were among the MSPs who signed. By February 2018, seventy MSPs had pledged their support, along with thirty five of Scotland's MPs - meaning that a majority of all of the nation's parliamentarians had endorsed the campaign.

== 2017: Governmental working group ==
In March 2017, a resolution calling on the Scottish Government to form a joint working group with TIE was debated and passed at the SNP's Spring Conference in Aberdeen. The resolution, moved by the SNP Youth, was supported by senior party politicians and many delegates spoke of their personal experiences of homophobia at school. The proposal for a working group was taken from TIE's strategy paper, which was released publicly in 2016. Following this, the Scottish Government formed the working group with education bodies in order to implement the proposals outlined in TIE's campaign pledge - which has been supported by a majority of MSPs. Representatives included Education Scotland, Equality and Human Rights Commission and Scottish Catholic Education Services alongside parents, youth organisations and LGBT charities.

On 19 April 2017, during a parliamentary debate on TIE led by Scottish Labour MSP Monica Lennon, the Scottish Government formally announced the launch of the working group. Members of the group were tasked with the implementation of LGBT inclusive education. Campaigners and MSPs from all parties insisted that the group must lead to "tangible action" and cannot delay.

The group concluded policy recommendations in August 2018, and its LGBTI Inclusive Education Report to the Scottish Ministers was launched in the Scottish Parliament in November 2018.

== 2018: Success ==
The campaign achieved its aims in November 2018, when the Scottish Government announced that it had accepted the recommendations of the Working Group in full and would be embedding LGBT themes across the national curriculum. The policy will apply to all public schools. TIE welcomed the news, claiming that the "destructive legacy" of Section 28 had been ended.

The Scottish Government claimed that the changes were a "world first" and confirmed that the new curricular content would be nationally implemented by 2021. That year, the Scottish Government launched its national platform lgbteducation.scot which hosts curriculum resources, professional learning, and guidance for teachers. It is managed by TIE and endorsed by various education stakeholders. In 2024, national guidance for schools on the delivery of LGBT inclusive education was published by the Scottish Government.

== Impact ==
The group's work and high-profile campaigning led to a national debate in Scotland around the issue of LGBT inclusion in the education sector. Commentators have referred to the situation as "Scotland's new Section 28 culture war".

In 2016, following the unanimous passing of a motion in favour of TIE at the SNP's conference, Nicola Sturgeon announced proposals to train teachers on equality issues in an effort to tackle homophobia in schools - in what the SNP described as a "leap forward" for LGBT equality. However, TIE argued that this "does not go far enough" as Sturgeon's proposals were not reflective of the expectations of the SNP membership. Commentators also noted that there was no specific commitment to funding for the training proposals, with leader of the Scottish Liberal Democrats Willie Rennie agreeing with TIE in arguing that the SNP should go further than their pledge. Following the launch of their election manifesto, the party committed to working with TIE.

Co-convener of the Scottish Green Party, Patrick Harvie, claimed that TIE has "been a really important new voice in the landscape of people campaigning on these issues" and outlined that "during the next session of the Scottish Parliament we have to see real progress. We wouldn’t even be in that position, of understanding how that progress had to happen, if it hadn’t been for the TIE campaign getting the ball rolling. It really is inspiring, the work they have done." He stated that Members of the Scottish Parliament, would hold the SNP to account on their commitment to adopt TIE's proposals for LGBT inclusive education.

In March 2016, during a leaders debate which focused on LGBT issues, all Scottish party leaders gave their support for LGBT inclusive education, with former leader of the Scottish Labour Party Kezia Dugdale stating: "Teachers aren't given enough time outside of the classroom to train on these issues. We've got to give them the confidence to teach LGBT issues."

In April 2017, during a parliamentary debate on the campaign, MSPs from all parties praised founders Jordan Daly and Liam Stevenson for their style of campaigning, citing the pair's "steely determination" and "radical edge" as indicative of the campaign's success.

In July 2025, during a long read interview with The Herald newspaper, Daly and Stevenson reflected on their campaign to recognise the tenth anniversary of TIE. Discussing the impact of their work, Daly noted that as a result of their campaigning “there is now a willingness, across education, to discuss and address homophobia in schools with confidence, and there is an understanding that this is about ensuring all pupils and families are included at school.”

The pair also addressed the culture war around minority rights in the UK and Anti-LGBTQ curriculum laws in the United States in the interview, explaining that “rhetoric imported from US culture wars is here too, especially online, and it is utterly detached from the reality in schools.”

== Services and Resources ==
In June 2016, TIE launched a teacher training scheme which piloted in Glasgow and Edinburgh in October 2016. The campaigners claimed that the initiative was a response to the "systematic barriers which prevent schools from becoming inclusive of LGBTI young people", such as the financial costs attributed to the training programmes that other organisations offer. Since 2021, the organisation has delivered a multistage training course for teachers on behalf of the Scottish Government. It is delivered by teaching staff.

TIE also provides education workshops to Scottish primary and secondary schools covering homophobic language, bullying and gender stereotypes alongside curriculum materials to support classroom learning.

The charity supported the publication of ‘The Lass and The Quine’ by Ashley Douglas and Kate Osmond, the first LGBT-inclusive children’s book written in the Scots language. The book is an extension of an original poem by Douglas commissioned by the charity.

TIE’s school services have been independently studied and evaluated by Darek Ciszek, a Social Science and Comparative Education researcher from University of California, Los Angeles. He publicly discussed his observations in 2025, stating that the charity’s pupil workshops “really do address some really important issues facing kids in schools around homophobia, language, stereotypes, and thinking about inclusion and diversity in a broader societal context.”

== Digital Discourse Initiative ==
In 2025, TIE partnered with global think thank Institute for Strategic Dialogue in Germany to develop and launch the Digital Discourse Initiative, a project providing schools in Scotland with tools and strategies to counter the effects of online hate and disinformation on children and young people.

The project was formally launched during a school visit by Jenny Gilruth, the Cabinet Secretary for Education and Skills.

Stevenson discussed the project during an interview with The Herald newspaper, describing it as a response to “radical misogyny, the mainstreaming of so-called manosphere and incel language across social media platforms, and how this is normalising old prejudice in a new way.”

== Controversy ==
In September 2016, SNP and Scottish Labour councillors in Glasgow City Council became embroiled in a row after SNP Councillor Angus Millar's proposed motion in support of TIE was dropped after the full council ran over time and could not debate the motion. There were suggestions from the floor to extend the meeting to ensure that the motion could be discussed, but this was overruled by council leader Frank McAveety and deputy leader Archie Graham. Following a public backlash, Millar wrote to McAveety recommending that he meet with TIE campaigners and expressing his disapproval of the events, highlighting that: "Our city’s schools must be safe, accepting and inclusive environments for young people of LGBTI+ identities to learn in, but too many young people experience homophobic and transphobic abuse, with deeply damaging consequences for their mental and emotional wellbeing."

In December 2016, Aamer Anwar addressed the debate as to whether LGBT education should be implemented in Scotland's faith schools. He expressed concerns that faith schools having the option to opt-out of delivering LGBT guidance was a political decision, and stated that if TIE's proposals are to be adopted then they "must include religious schools, as there can be no opt out - no matter how politically inconvenient it may be."

In January 2017, Reverend John Nugent of the Church of Scotland endorsed the campaign and addressed the division between campaigners and some religious groups over the issue, arguing that the mainstream faith agenda must be "seized back from the bigots" opposed to LGBT inclusive education.

== Criticism ==
The campaign has been criticised by Reverend David Robertson of the Free Church of Scotland, who claimed that its aims were in breach of the rights of Christian parents. Writing to the Scottish Parliament, Robertson expressed his concern that TIE's petition was a "Trojan horse to impose an ideological perspective on all pupils, whether they want it or not".

Writing in the Scottish Catholic Observer, former school teacher Hugh McLoughlin argued that, by discussing his suicidal convictions as a young gay teenager, Daly was "shamelessly" deploying an emotional tool to "affect political and public sentiment" to achieve an agenda of LGBT inclusion within the education system. He dismissed TIE's claims that homophobia is a problem in schools and stated that poverty and discrimination against Catholic youth were bigger issues.

== See also ==
- Education and the LGBT community
- LGBT rights in Scotland
- LGBT sex education
