= Birmingham Pride =

Annual LGBT event in Birmingham, England

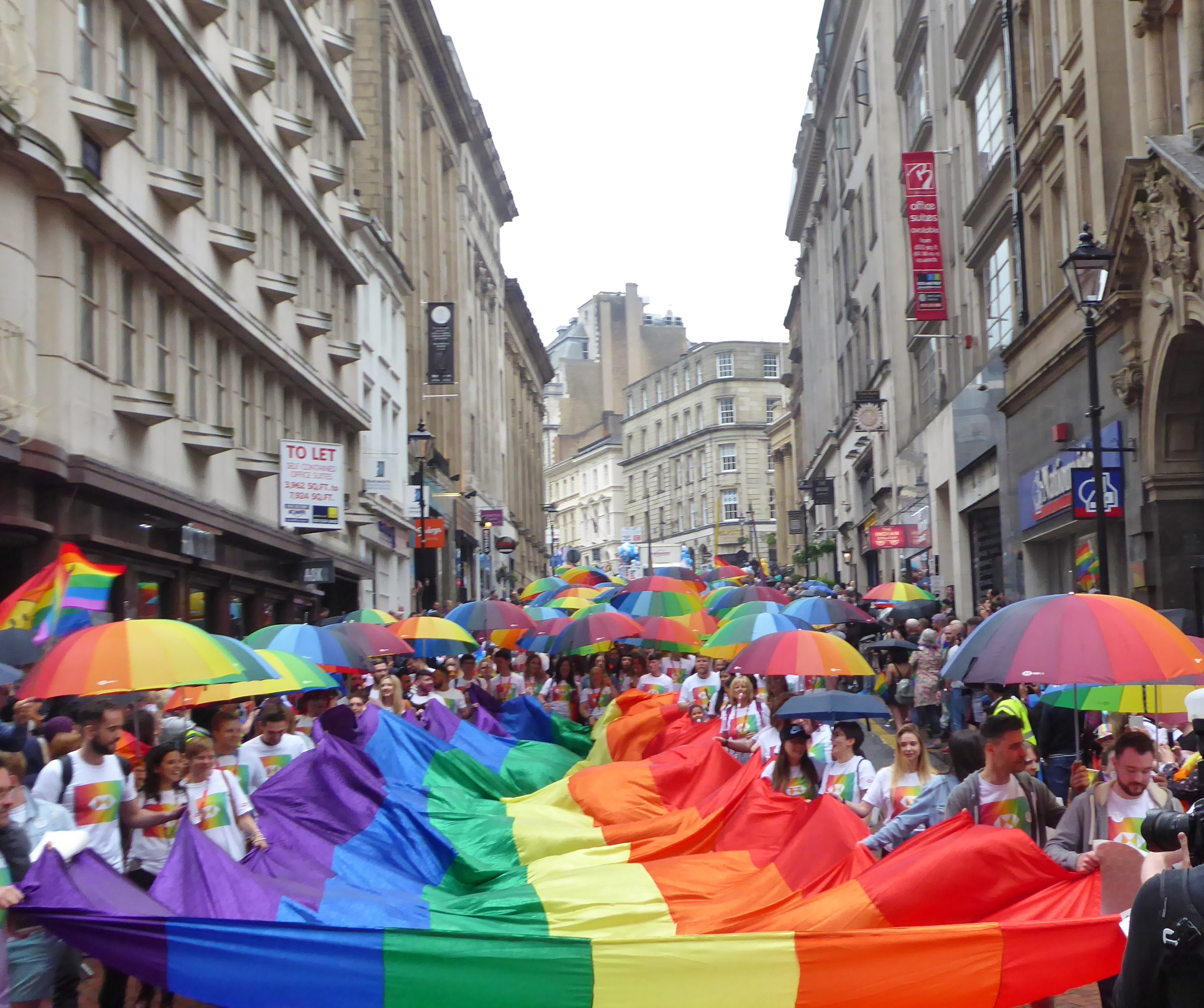
- A large pride flag at Birmingham Pride 2018
- Frequency: Annually
- Locations: Birmingham, England
- Founded: 1977; 49 years ago
- Website: birminghampride.com

Birmingham Pride is a weekend-long LGBTQ festival held annually in the Gay Village, Hurst Street, Birmingham, England. Birmingham Pride is the UK's largest two-day gay pride festival.

== History ==
=== Birmingham Gay Pride 1972 and Five Days of Fun ===
The first Birmingham Gay Pride Weekend took place on 8–9 July 1972, a week after London's first Gay Pride Rally. A decade later, from 1983 until 1996, an event named Five Days of Fun was held in Birmingham over August Bank Holiday.

=== Launch of Birmingham Pride ===
Birmingham Pride's official launch took place in 1997, being staged outside the Nightingale Club and attended by several thousand people.

24–25 May were the dates for the 2008 event, though its parade was cancelled. By 2009, there were funding issues; businesses had stopped funding the event, and there had been disputes around its financial backing. There had also been poor weather. BBC News also reported that "revellers ha[d] hailed the events as a consistent success."

Birmingham Pride in 2009 was scheduled to be held on 23 and 24 May, with the parade on the 23rd starting from Victoria Square after a political rally and entertainment, then moving along New Street to the Gay Village quarter. Organiser Lawrence Barton stated that Pride was "no longer a gay protest or political event," as he said times had changed. The parade included the charity ABplus which worked with individuals living with or affected by HIV. Attractions included a village green, a market with community stalls, dance arenas, funfair rides, a cabaret and comedy marquee, and a 'Pride's Got Talent' competition. Acts at the Nightingale club, which was celebrating its 40th anniversary, were scheduled to include S Club, Sonia, 3Mix, Sean Rumsey, D:Ream, Booty Luv, Katrina Leskanich and Blazin' Squad. Attendees and businesses were encouraged to be more environmentally friendly for the event.

=== 2010s ===
The 2013 event had the theme of 'Equal Love', and before the profession started equal rights campaigner Peter Tatchell gave a speech in support of marriage equality. Barton touted the event as a "great boost" to Birmingham's economy.

Birmingham Pride became a ticketed event in 2014. It was planned that Tatchell would lead the parade, which would start at noon from Victoria Square and include over 50 floats and walking groups, including an LGBT working group of Birmingham paramedics. Scheduled performances included Katy B, Connor Maynard, Gabrielle, Ms Dynamite, and Howard Donald of Take That. Tens of thousands of people were expected to attend the celebrations. It rained heavily on the day of the parade, though it went ahead, with Tatchell again giving a speech at its start. A marriage proposal occurred at the festival.

2016 was the event's 20th year, with a theme of 'A Generation of Pride', intending to mark achievements in LGBT equality and the development of Birmingham's gay scene to include 15 bars and clubs over the previous two decades. It had an expected total turnout of 50,000, and was slated to feature over 100 artists and DJs. 6,000 people took part in the parade.

Prior to the 2018 event, Virgin Trains unveiled a train with pride-themed livery, its first stop being Birmingham. Headline artists at the 2018 Birmingham Pride, on 26–27 May, included Rudimental, Jake Shears and Beth Ditto. Tens of thousands of people attended.

The 2019 event took place on 25–26 May. Andrew Moffat, who had taught lessons at Parkfield Community School since 2014 as part of a programme called No Outsiders that covered LGBT relationships and that had led to protests by some Muslim parents, led the parade with Supporting Education of Equality and Diversity in Schools member Saima Razzaq and founder of Birmingham South Asians LGBT Khakan Qureshi.

=== 2020s ===
The line-up for Birmingham Pride 2020, scheduled for 23–24 May and with the theme 'Stronger Together', included Cheryl, Saweetie, Kelly Rowland, Vengaboys, Katy B, Riton, Ms Banks, Black Box, Sister Sledge, Raye, Freemasons, Dorian Electra, and Tom Aspaul, as well as drag queens Baga Chipz, Peppermint and Sum Ting Wong. The entertainment was to be situated in Smithfield. However, it was announced on 23 March that the event would be postponed to 5–6 September due to the COVID-19 pandemic. It was later cancelled altogether, and a digital event took place instead. A rainbow crossing designed by artists and drag performers James Cowper and Matthew Stephens – which had already been designed for the event – was unveiled in August as part of the temporary pedestrianisation of part of the Southside area. It was based on the progress pride flag, and located on Hurst Street.

In February 2021, Birmingham Pride's date was delayed from May to September 25–26 as a result of the announcement that there would be no restrictions on large events from 21 June. Organisers attempted to hold onto as much of its previous year's line-up as possible, however Cheryl cancelled due to the death of her bandmate Sarah Harding. Katy B, Raye, and Sister Sledge returned and Clean Bandit, Sophie Ellis-Bextor, Jodie Harsh, and Boney M. were also scheduled to perform. The Library of Birmingham and venues in the Gay Village were expected to shine rainbow colours.

== See also ==
- List of LGBT events
