= Jordan Daly =

Scottish campaigner and founder of TIE campaign group

Jordan Daly is a Scottish campaigner and co founder of the Time for Inclusive Education (TIE) charity. His activity focuses mainly on homophobic bullying in schools, LGBT education, and media literacy initiatives to address prejudice and disinformation. He was awarded LGBT Role Model of the Year at the 2017 Icon Awards, named as one of the "top ten biggest players in Scottish education" by TES magazine, Young Scot of the Year 2018 at the Young Scot Awards, and provided with an Honorary Fellowship Degree of the Educational Institute of Scotland (EIS) in 2026.

== Background ==
Daly is gay and has spoken openly about mental health and his suicidal thoughts during his teenage years as a consequence of experiencing homophobia at school. He graduated from the University of Glasgow and began his campaigning activity during his studies when he was 19 years old.

== Time for Inclusive Education (TIE) ==
Daly and Liam Stevenson founded Time for Inclusive Education (known as the TIE campaign) in June 2015, with the aim of including LGBT topics in the school curriculum to address and prevent homophobic bullying. They met and began their political activity during the Scottish independence referendum. The pair are credited with winning gains for the LGBT community in relation to education, including achieving the support of the Scottish Parliament for their cause and the creation of a Scottish Government LGBT education working group of which both are currently members.

In 2018 the group proposed policy recommendations to the Scottish Government, all of which were accepted, making Scotland the first country in the world to include LGBT themes in the curriculum for all public schools. Daly and Stevenson publicly stated that their campaigning efforts had been successful.

With Ian Rivers and Stevenson, Daly contributed a chapter covering the extent of online homophobic bullying and harassment experienced by school pupils in Scotland during the COVID-19 pandemic in ‘Cyberbullying and Online Harms’.

In 2025, TIE partnered with global think thank Institute for Strategic Dialogue in Germany to develop and launch the Digital Discourse Initiative, a project providing schools in Scotland with tools and strategies to counter the effects of online hate and disinformation on children and young people.

Daly discussed the impact of his campaigning activity in an interview with The Herald to recognise the tenth anniversary of TIE in the summer of 2025, stating that “there is now a willingness, across education, to discuss and address homophobia in schools with confidence, and there is an understanding that this is about ensuring all pupils and families are included at school.”

In 2026, Jordan was awarded an Honorary Fellowship of the Educational Institute of Scotland (EIS), the highest honour conferred by Scotland’s largest education union. Fellowship Degrees are among the most prestigious honours in Scottish education, recognising individuals who have made an exceptional contribution to the profession. They are conferred following nomination and rigorous scrutiny by an elected Board of Examiners.
