= Liam Stevenson =

Scottish political activist and founder of TIE campaign group

Liam Stevenson is a Scottish campaigner who founded the Time for Inclusive Education (TIE) campaigning group and charity. His work focuses on homophobia in schools, LGBT education, and media literacy initiatives countering prejudice and disinformation. In 2026, he was awarded with an Honorary Fellowship Degree of the Educational Institute of Scotland (EIS).

== Background ==
Stevenson organised public meetings during the Scottish independence referendum in 2014. He became involved in LGBT activism after meeting Daly that year. Stevenson has publicly discussed his motivation, noting that “I realised that people like me, who aren't gay, had a role to play. I also thought about my own daughter, who was three at the time, and I knew that I wanted her generation to have a different experience at school.”

== Time for Inclusive Education (TIE) ==
Stevenson and Jordan Daly founded Time for Inclusive Education (known as the TIE Campaign) in June 2015. The pair are credited with winning gains for the LGBT community in relation to education, including achieving the support of the Scottish Parliament for their cause as well as the creation of a Scottish Government LGBT education working group of which both are currently members.

In 2018 the group proposed policy recommendations to the Scottish Government, all of which were accepted, making Scotland the first country in the world to include LGBT themes in the curriculum for all public schools. Stevenson and Daly publicly stated that their campaigning efforts had been successful.

With Ian Rivers and Daly, Stevenson contributed a chapter covering the extent of online homophobic bullying and harassment experienced by school pupils in Scotland during the COVID-19 pandemic in ‘Cyberbullying and Online Harms’.

In 2025, TIE partnered with global think thank Institute for Strategic Dialogue in Germany to develop and launch the Digital Discourse Initiative, a project providing schools in Scotland with tools and strategies to counter the effects of online hate and disinformation on children and young people.

Stevenson discussed the project during an interview with The Herald newspaper, describing it as a response to “radical misogyny, the mainstreaming of so-called manosphere and incel language across social media platforms, and how this is normalising old prejudice in a new way.”

He reflected on the impact of his campaigning activity in the interview to recognise the tenth anniversary of TIE in the summer of 2025, stating that as a parent he is “fortunate to live in a Scotland that has a world-leading approach to addressing homophobic bullying, one that recognises it’s time to break the generational cycle of normalised prejudice in schools.”

In 2026, Liam was awarded an Honorary Fellowship of the Educational Institute of Scotland (EIS), the highest honour conferred by Scotland’s largest education union. Fellowship Degrees are among the most prestigious honours in Scottish education, recognising individuals who have made an exceptional contribution to the profession. They are conferred following nomination and rigorous scrutiny by an elected Board of Examiners.
