= Parkfield Community School =

Primary school in Birmingham, England

Location
- Parkfield Road; Saltley; Birmingham, West Midlands, B8 3AX; England
- Coordinates: 52.4848053°N 1.8488142°W

Information
- Type: Academy
- Motto: learning for life
- Local authority: Birmingham City Council
- Trust: Excelsior Multi Academy Trust
- Department for Education URN: 139162 Tables
- Ofsted: Reports
- Head teacher: James Wright
- Gender: Mixed
- Age: 3 to 11
- Website: www.parkfield.bham.sch.uk

Parkfield Community School is a primary school in Saltley, Birmingham, West Midlands, England. In 2013, it became an academy school, which means it receives its funding directly from the central rather than local government, in contrast with a community school. The government authority Ofsted found that the school maintained high standards in inspections in 2016 and 2019. In 2019 98% of the students were Muslim.

== No Outsiders controversy ==
Parkfield received extended national attention starting in 2016 over its No Outsiders curriculum which teaches tolerance of differences. The programme had been created in 2014 by assistant headteacher (as of 2019) Andrew Moffat, who is gay. There were extended protests and activism by parents against the programme for several years, which grew to include people from other faiths from outside the local area. The protesters accused the school of encouraging the children to be gay. Some of the allegations circulated in the controversy included that the "sexual mechanics" of homosexuality were depicted to children with clay figures, which the school broadly denied. Ofsted confirmed that the programme was appropriate.

Following 5 months of consultation the programme restarted in September 2019, entitled "No Outsiders for a Faith Community", and included year group consultations with parents in advance of the lessons starting. Despite Ofsted having assessed the programme as age-appropriate, objections from some parents, and calls for him to be dismissed, continued.

In 2019 Birmingham City Council applied to the High Court for an injunction to create an exclusion zone to protect the affected schools from organised protests following an investigation by the Commission for Countering Extremism which revealed the protests had been taken over by Hizb ut-Tahir and other pro-Islamist groups, unconnected to either school, with a specific aim to “entrench social division” and “amplify hate” against LGBT people. The judge, Mark Warby upheld a permanent exclusion to the groups and stated they had deliberately “grossly misinterpreted” the programme by suggesting it promoted paedophilia which was not true."

Moffat also runs an after-school club called Parkfield Ambassadors. Here children learn more about the programme and visit other local schools to tell pupils about it. One aim of the club is to make connections between school children and reduce the risk of radicalisation in vulnerable groups.

== See also ==
- Anderton Park Primary School
- Education and the LGBT community
- Section 28
