= Education and LGBTQ people =

Historically speaking, around the world, lesbian, gay, bisexual, transgender and queer (LGBTQ) people have not been given equal treatment and rights by law as well as general society. Much of the intolerance for LGBTQ individuals come from lack of education around the LGBTQ community, and contributes to the stigma that results in many laws that directly disadvantage LGBTQ individuals, such as (as of November 2026) homosexuality being illegal in 61 countries, same-sex marriage being legal in only 39 countries, gender-affirming care being legal in only 59 countries, gender marker change being legal in only 60 countries (of which only 31 do not require surgery), involuntary intersex medical interventions being banned in only 12 countries, among many other laws, and a persistence of discrimination, such as in schooling, the workplace, and housing.

In the recent history of the expansion of LGBTQ rights, the topic of teaching various aspects of lesbian, gay, bisexual and transgender life and existence to children in schools has become a heated point of debate, with proponents stating that the teaching of LGBTQ-affirming topics to children will increase a sense of visibility for LGBTQ students and reduce incidences of homophobia and closeted behavior for children, resulting in safer learning environments and coming-of-age for all students, while opponents to the pedagogical discussion of LGBTQ people to students are afraid that such discussions would encourage children to violate or question religiously or ideologically motivated rejections of non-heterosexuality in private settings (or promote a "homosexual agenda"). Much of the religious and/or social conservative aversion to non-heterosexuality and the broaching of the topic to juveniles tends to occur in regions with a historic demographic dominance or majority of adherents to an Abrahamic religion, particularly Christianity, Islam and Judaism, while those who were raised in those religions but take more favorable/nuanced positions on LGBTQ issues or are LGBTQ themselves may often be ostracized from more socially conservative congregations over the issue. However, some countries that are highly atheist or secular, such as China and South Korea, also have significant aversion to LGBTQ education and people in government and society.

== By issue ==
=== Organization of students ===
The primary type of organization for representation of LGBT students on campus is the gay–straight alliance, also known as GSA. These are organized in order to represent requests by LGBTQ and LGBTQ ally students on campus to the administration and faculty, to encourage a safer environment for students. The first GSAs were mainly established to combat the invisibility of LGBTQ students. Gay-straight alliance organizations tend to emphasize the issues of the LGBT community as affecting not only sexual minorities, but everyone. Another common student organization found throughout school settings is the gay student organization, also referred to as GSO. Gay student organizations are groups that are created with the purpose of providing support to students who are gender-nonconforming or are sexual minorities.

These student clubs are used for a variety of purposes, such as serving as a space for students to socialize without needing to censor their identity and with the knowledge that other people within that space are either LGBTQ or LGBTQ allies. These student organizations also help promote the education of homophobia as an issue, while also often spreading LGBTQ-related positive messages on campus.

There is evidence reported by LGBTQ students that shows a decrease in homophobic remarks and targeted victimization when compared to educational settings that do not have safe spaces incorporated into the school structure. With this decrease in negative experiences, there are also reports of student body cohesiveness and intolerance for displays of homophobia. Literature revolving around the inclusion of GSAs within educational settings has shown to increase the quality of student life. These support networks are aimed at the welfare and mental health of LGBTQ students through connecting the students with the larger community. GSAs have been shown to enhance the overall level of LGBT visibility, safety and comfort, and open up opportunities to develop and sustain relationships with other students and school staff members. Public schools in the US that received funding have been able to implement more measures to support LGBTQ students in recent years. These include support strategies and programs such as GSAs. Religious private schools on the other hand, which do not receive funding from the government, have less support measures in place for their students in these ways.

LGBTQ student centers may be organized as offices of the school's administration that offer paid faculty support to students. They not only support the LGBTQ community, but also promote positivity and equality for all students. Resources are also usually given for any kind of information needed. LGBTQ student centers also tend to serve as safe spaces, and tend to enforce the obligation of all staff and visitors to be respectful and mindful of everyone’s sexual orientations and gender identities. They aim to create a welcoming space for awareness.

=== Homophobia vs. heterosexism ===
Homophobia and heterosexism or heteronormativity are closely related words, used to represent a fear of equality of the heterosexual population and the LGBTQ community. Homophobia, for example, is defined by "overt expression of dislike, harassment and even assault" towards the LGBTQ community. Heterosexism, on the other hand, describes a sense of entitlement to denounce the superiority of heterosexuality and the need for heterosexuality to be the only acceptable sexual orientation. However, homophobia and heterosexism are intermingling, pertaining to the ability to proclaim heterosexuality as "normal" and therefore, homosexuality as "abnormal" and "different". Homophobia can also be used to reinforce heterosexism in an institution such as in education, as curriculums in schools tend to be based on a heteronormative perspective, which increases the need for others to conform to heterosexuality and therefore ignore homophobia.

=== Prevention of bullying ===
The issue of homophobic and transphobic bullying and violence by students and teachers is increasingly broached by advocates as a reason for the intervention of administration on behalf of LGBTQ students.

A restorative approach in schools is a way of preventing bullying of LGBTQ students. Planning committees can be formed by students who want to help educate their peers on LGBTQ. A restorative response that helped educate students and school staff included a Lesbian and Gay Pride week at an elementary school in Canada in the late 1990s. A student-planned unit on Lesbian and Gay Pride week was composed of a series of events dedicated to educate on LGBT history, diverse family structures, and included guest speakers. Restorative responses help provide welcoming, safe, and equitable environments.

The creation of safe spaces can potentially reduce or alleviate the effects of harassment and violence that LGBTQ students face. These effects can include an increase in dropout rates, poorer academic performance, higher rates of depression, increased risk of PTSD and substance abuse, and absenteeism. Safe spaces at schools can include gay student organizations as well as having an Office of Gender and Sexual Diversity that is handled at the administrative level. The majority of harassment towards a student's sexuality is either under-reported or not reported at all. This is due to students feeling that school personnel and administrators will not do anything about it or because they fear it might make the situation worse. Schools that include safe spaces as well as implementing courses in queer studies helps in making students feel welcome and safe.

=== Psychological effects from lack of education on LGBTQ topics ===
Schools create a specific, unofficial culture around sexualities, and one study cites that homophobia presents itself in high schools as bullying, teasing, name-calling, and the use of slurs. An 8-year study observing the long-term effects of homophobia found that just under half of the sample of children of gay parents have been treated unfairly. Additionally, adolescents with psychological issues may be less like to use cognitive restructuring of homophobic experiences against their parents or themselves, and homophobic stigmatization in general can lead to more psychological problems. It was then found for adolescents who did experience homophobic stigmatization, their ratings for meaning in life was lower and their internalizing problems were increased. The study notes the fact that heteronormativity and broad society impacts offspring of gay parents, within the context that the large majority of offspring do not have a sexual minority identity. This goes to support how increasing education on LGBT topics can only benefit everyone. The researchers concluded that long-term effects of homophobic stigmatization are indeed prevalent, and urge schools and communities to include all type of families in diversity appreciation programs.

=== LGBTQ history and social sciences ===
The inclusion of LGBTQ topics in teaching of history and social sciences are also advocated by topics in order to increase pride and self-respect among LGBTQ students and reduce shame or self-pity for the lack of emphasis upon famous LGBTQ persons. With regards to the topic, it is somewhat important to acknowledge what it is like to be labeled as LGBTQ. Often people use words that may relate to the LGBT community with a negative annotation. For example, phrases like "that's so gay" suggest that being gay is a "bad" thing. The more we allow this kind of communication, it will only continue to be a criticized expression. To some it comes as a relief and sense of empowerment, but others have to deal with the stigma which is attached to LGBT. The common stereotypes of queer include, but are not limited to: sexually confused, pedophiles, and violation of gender roles. Stereotypes help to create the stigma which is cast upon the LGBT community, which in turn results in the marginalization of the group. Labeling can effect others attitudes towards the individual being labeled. The labeling perspective also focuses on the roles of moral entrepreneurs, rule creators and enforcers. These are individuals who create rules and enforce them.

==== Sex education ====
As general sex education often faces fierce opposition from religious congregations which are doctrinally averse to contraception, sex education which includes homosexuality is considered especially egregious among opponents. The matter of sex education often leads more devout Abrahamists to withdraw their children from the school's tutelage, leading to further educational terms which emphasize Abrahamic religious mores, such as abstinence, heterosexuality and monogamy. This aversion is criticized by advocates of sex education who assert that many of the pupils of such education eventually find their own means to those practices or realizations which are expressly forbidden by religious institutions.

As well, sexual education curriculums continuously fails to inform LGBTQ students on crucial health issues that may arise during sexual intercourse. Some of the neglected information reflects on sexually transmitted diseases, such as HIV and AIDS, which are commonly enforced upon the gay community through socially accepted stereotypes. Sex ed curriculum also disregards any information pivotal to LGBTQ students in order for schools to avoid tensions with religious groups. Likewise, most of the material presented in schools focus on a heterosexual perspective that encourages "abstinence until marriage", a typical practice accredited to various religious groups that promote the need of heterosexuality for a healthy sexual life.

==== Curriculum ====
School curriculum have been predominantly reinforcing heteronormativity in subtle and overt ways while ignoring or marginalizing homosexuality. Inclusive curricula allow for positive and truthful representations of LGBT people that have initially been excluded when teaching about historical events. Schools that have successfully implemented an inclusive curriculum report a decrease in homophobic remarks, and absenteeism. A curriculum is considered inclusive when LGBTQ experiences are added to the lesson plan; ensuring that the lesson and examples are not strictly heterocentric. In 2010, Kosciw, Greytak, Diaz and Bartkiewicz suggested that the incorporation of positive representations of LGBT people, history, and events into existing curricula would improve the experiences of sexual minorities throughout their schooling years.

The state of California introduced The FAIR Education Act; Fair, Accurate, Inclusive, and Respectful, which aimed to include LGBT events into history books and instructional materials. Individuals that have shaped the political and social sphere such as Harvey Milk and Matthew Shepard are now recognized as important and have become a part of the curriculum. Research has yielded that the exclusion and marginalization of LGBT people and events from school curriculums and history in general perpetuate negative stereotypes of the LGBT community. Positive representations have been shown to promote respect and decrease bullying. Adopting an inclusive curriculums have reported increased feelings of security within school settings, better attendance and feelings of somewhat to high acceptance of LGBT people as opposed to educational institutions without an inclusive curriculum.

In 1991, the New York City Board of Education produced a curriculum for first grade teachers entitled "Children of the Rainbow," that supported multicultural education under New York City Public schools chancellor Joseph A. Fernandez. The controversies surrounding this curriculum blocked its usage in classrooms in 1992. However, activist groups such as the Anti-Violence Project and Queens Gays and Lesbians United protested its rejection and championed the need for community educational resources. These actions also spurred the formation of the first Queens Pride Parade by community leaders such as public school teacher and later New York City Council member Danny Dromm and activist Maritza Martinez.

=== Formal event dress and gender identity ===
Where schools may hold formal engagements such as proms, homecomings and Winter Formals which typically involve set gender roles, issues have arisen with the following:

- attendance of same-sex student couples
- the wearing of non-gender-conforming dress (i.e., female students wearing tuxedos and male students wearing skirts or blouses)
- the crowning of female event kings and male event queens.

Various jurisdictions have taken different reactions to such issues, which have resulted in controversy and legal disputes over discrimination by state schools (i.e., the 2010 Itawamba County School District prom controversy).

=== Queer-inclusive student events ===
Campus events have been created for LGBTQ students in order to be inclusive of such students and their allies. These include the queer prom and the Lavender Graduation; the latter was first organized by Dr. Ronni Sanlo, then the director of the LGBT Center at the University of Michigan, in 1995.

== Education sector responses to LGBT violence ==
Education sector responses to LGBT violence addresses the ways in which education systems work to create safe learning environments for LGBT students. Overall, education sector responses tend to focus on homophobia and physical violence linked to sexual orientation and gender identity/expression, and less on transphobia. Most responses focus in some way on diverse expressions of gender and support students to understand that gender may be expressed in a different way from binary models of masculine and feminine. Responses vary greatly in their scope (from a single class to the national level), duration (from one-off events to several years), and level of authority support (from individual teachers to the highest levels of government).

== By region ==
=== United States ===
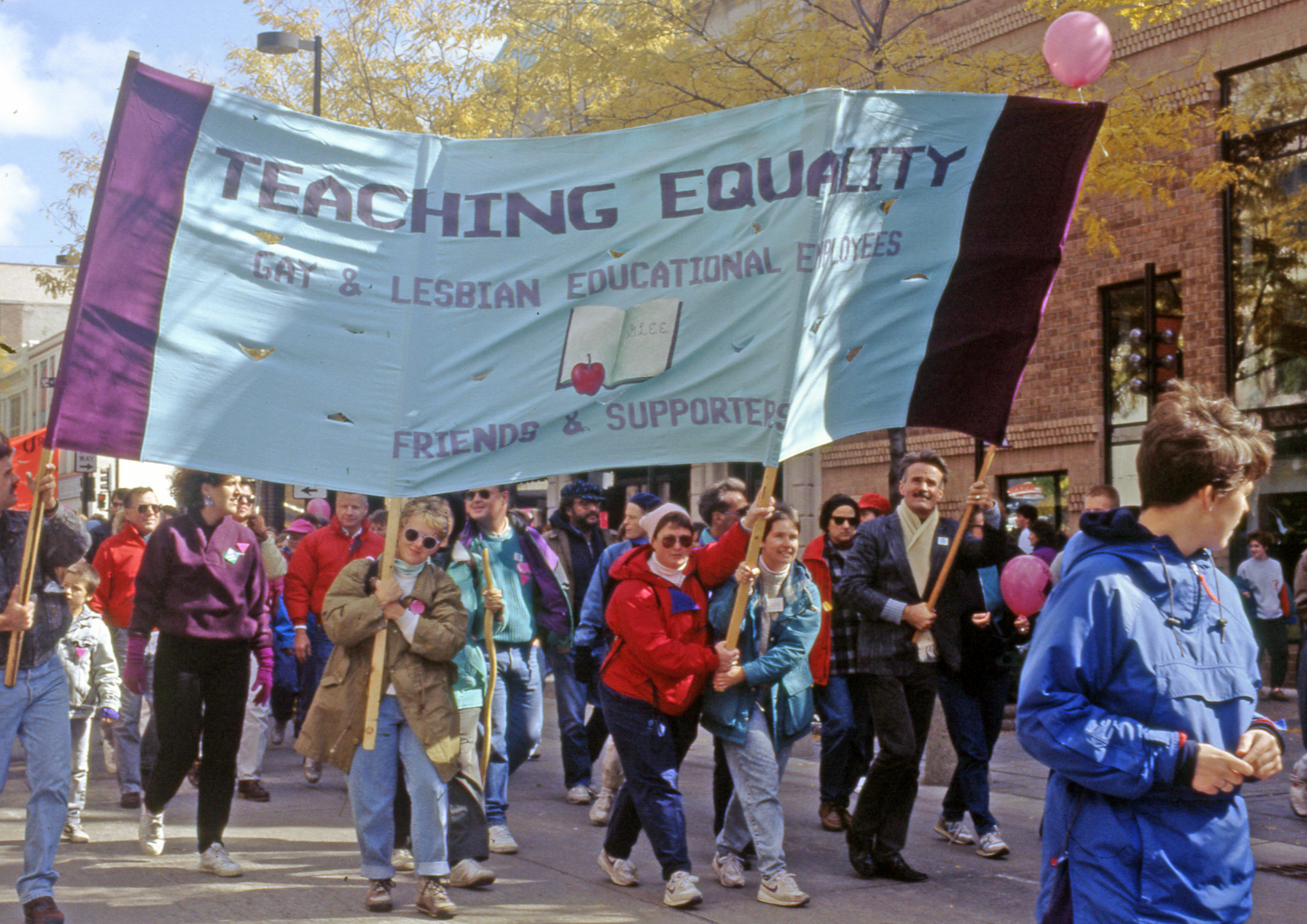
Educators at a 1991 demonstration in Madison, Wisconsin

Historic legal denigration of non-heterosexuality and non-PIV sexual intercourse (even among heterosexual partners) continues to have a long-running residual effect on the public discourse in the United States. The first gay-straight alliances to be established in public schools in the early 1990s faced stiff opposition from faculty, administration and parents of students, with protests and fierce debates over the matter, but GSAs have since been established for middle school students in a number of jurisdictions.

In California, GSAs now number over 762, representing over 50% of California's public high schools. In 2011, the State Legislature passed the FAIR Education Act, which, if signed into law, would make California the first state in the United States to mandate the teaching of LGBT-affirmative social sciences (i.e., LGBT history) in the public school system and forbid discriminatory language in the school curriculum.

Discussion and teaching of LGBTQ topics has been increasingly restricted as part of the 2020s anti-LGBTQ movement in the United States. In 2022, the state of Florida passed a bill titled CS/CS/HB 1557 — Parental Rights in Education. This bill restricts all LGBTQ topics for grades K-3 and requires teachers, educators, and school staff to inform guardians when their student informs them about a change of gender identity or sexual orientation. Other states, like Missouri, are soon to follow this precedent.

One of the pre-eminent organizations advocating for LGBTQ education and academic rights in the United States is GLSEN.

As of 13 August 2019, four US states were required by law to acquire LGBT related-topics into social science classes: California, Colorado, Illinois, and New Jersey.

=== United Kingdom ===
Parkfield Community School in Birmingham received extended national attention starting in 2016 over its "No Outsiders" curriculum which teaches tolerance of differences. The program had been created in 2014 by gay teacher Andrew Moffat who is assistant headteacher at the school. There were extended protests and activism against the program by the predominantly Muslim parents for several years, which grew to include people from other faiths from outside the local area. The parents accused the school of fostering acceptance and the permissibility of homosexuality in young children. Some of the allegations circulated in the controversy included that the "sexual mechanics" of homosexuality were depicted to children with clay figures, which the school broadly denies. The government agency Ofsted said that the program was appropriate. In 2019, Anderton Park Primary School, also in Birmingham, faced similar objections.

Time for Inclusive Education is a Scottish LGBTQ+ advocacy group that successfully lobbied for inclusive education to the Scottish Parliament. In 2021, Scotland declared that all schools must implement LGBT-inclusive education to their curriculum. This includes topics and issues on same-sex marriage, same-sex parenting, homophobia, biphobia, transphobia, and the HIV and AIDS epidemic. Schools must also integrate LGBT inclusion in everyday learning. The government hopes to reduce bullying among LGBTQ+ children and provide a more well-rounded education. Scotland is the first country in the world to require the incorporation of LGBT history in schools. This decision has made an impact on other countries. For example, Wales announced it will implement an LGBT-inclusive sex education by 2022.

=== Canada ===
In 2016, a report titled "The National Inventory of School District Interventions in Support of LGBTQ Student Wellbeing" was issued by Lead Investigator Dr. Catherine Taylor from the University of Winnipeg and her research team. The report, funded by the Canadian Institutes of Health Research, outlines the interventions taken by Canadian public schools in support of LGBTQ students. Findings presented in the report include the greater likelihood of urban school districts to have LGBTQ-specific interventions compared to rural school districts and that, in general, Alberta and Quebec were less likely than other Canadian provinces to have LGBTQ-specific interventions. The report also found that interventions were more likely to occur at the elementary and middle school levels than the high school level.

Throughout Canada, school districts were far less likely to have trans-specific policies compared to sexual-orientation-specific policies.

=== Europe ===
The Recommendation to member states on measures to combat discrimination on grounds of sexual orientation or gender identity was adopted unanimously by the Committee of Ministers of the Council of Europe in 2010. It advises the education sectors of the 47 member states to take measures 'at all levels to promote mutual tolerance and respect in schools, regardless of sexual orientation or gender identity'. It specifies that this should include 'providing objective information with respect to sexual orientation and gender identity, for instance in school curricula and educational materials, and providing pupils and students with the necessary information, protection and support to enable them to live in accordance with their sexual orientation and gender identity'. The recommendation further advises countries to 'design and implement school equality and safety policies and action plans and may ensure access to adequate anti-discrimination training or support and teaching aids'.

The European Social Charter guarantees the right to the protection of health, including through the provision of advisory and educational facilities. This positive obligation 'extends to ensuring that educational materials do not reinforce demeaning stereotypes and perpetuate forms of prejudice which contribute to the social exclusion, embedded discrimination and denial of human dignity often experienced by historically marginalized groups such as persons of non-heterosexual orientation.'

==== Russia ====
LGBTQ children are not affirmed in Russian schools. LGBTQ topics are not implemented into school curriculums in Russia due to the Russian gay propaganda law. This law bans any promotion of LGBTQ relationships, or any promotion of social relations that deviate from "traditional family values". "The legislation introduces fines of up to 5,000 rubles for individuals and 200,000 for officials who disseminate information about homosexuality among minors." A sense of community is often valuable for LGBTQ individuals, especially as a resource for accurate information on sexuality and gender, but this law makes it extremely difficult for youth in Russian schools to find community.

=== Australia ===
In Australia, the Safe Schools Coalition's approach actively supports the establishment of Gay Straight Alliances (GSAs) and other youth-led initiatives for peer support and information. It also provides professional development for teachers and other school staff that can be tailored to schools' specific needs. It has developed guidelines on non-discrimination, bullying and diversity policies and a broad set of resources, including books and videos.

=== Saudi Arabia ===
Public education in Saudi Arabia is required to teach basic Islamic values based on the interpretation of the Quran, which includes a strong condemnation of homosexuality. In addition, Islam condemns cross-dressing. The Ministry of Education approved textbooks that reflect the country's Islamic and cultural view against homosexual acts by stating that "homosexuality is one of the most disgusting sins and greatest crimes", and that the proper punishment for the intentional act of homosexual intercourse in public is capital punishment. However, in 2020 the Ministry of Education was found to have removed the condemnation of homosexuality as something punishable by death from textbooks.

In 2012, the Saudi government asked the CPVPV to assist in the expulsion of students who were judged, by their mannerisms and taste in fashion, to be gay or lesbian.

Private schools exist in Saudi Arabia, mainly to serve the needs of expatriates with children, and they are generally allowed more discretion in setting up their own school curriculum and policies. Unless a majority of the expatriate families are Muslim, the private school is likely to only teach the basic beliefs of Islam, through lessons about the culture, language and history of Saudi Arabia. Textbook content or policies regarding homosexuality or cross-dressing tends to be influenced by the prevailing attitudes of the expatriates and their country of origin.

=== Global frameworks ===
Several international human rights mechanisms mandate safe, accepting and supportive learning environments that are free from violence and discrimination for all students, including LGBTQ discrimination. Together, these frameworks support a rights-based response to violence in schools – one that can be applied to addressing homophobic and transphobic violence in educational settings.

The right to education is recognized under: Article 26 of the Universal Declaration of Human Rights (1948); the UNESCO Convention against Discrimination in Education (1960); Article 13 of the International Covenant on Economic, Social and Cultural Rights (1966); Article 10 of the Convention on the Elimination of All Forms of Discrimination against Women (1981); and Article 28 of the Convention on the Rights of the Child (1989).

The Convention on the Rights of the Child is the most widely ratified human rights treaty in the world. The original text, adopted in 1989, did not refer directly to sexual orientation or gender identity/expression. However, the UN Committee on the Rights of the Child has specified how the convention can be used to protect children who are perceived to not conform to gender norms, including LGBTQ children. This is particularly through the committee's General Comments, which interpret the content of the human rights provisions. For example, in 2003, the Committee clarified in General Comment (GC #4), Paragraph 6, that 'States parties have the obligation to ensure that all human beings below 18 enjoy all the rights set forth in the Convention without discrimination (art. 2) [...] These grounds also cover adolescents' sexual orientation'. This, therefore, recognized that the universal rights described by the Convention apply also to children who are lesbian, gay or bisexual, or perceived as such.

Subsequently, the UN Committee on the Rights of the Child made concluding observations to several State Parties (which can be considered as jurisprudence). It also issued additional General Comments related to the protection of the rights of LGBT children using the following three articles of the convention:

- Article 2: The right to non-discrimination.
- Article 19: The right to be protected against any form of physical or mental violence, injury or abuse.
- Article 24: The right of the Child to the enjoyment of the highest attainable standard of health.

Several past and current international development agendas also mandate learning environments that are safe and inclusive for all students and guarantee their well-being, specifying or implying that educational institutions should be free from violence.

== See also ==
- LGBT movements
- LGBT sex education

== Sources ==
This article incorporates text from a free content work. Licensed under CC-BY-SA IGO 3.0 (license statement/permission). Text taken from Out in the Open: Education sector responses to violence based on sexual orientation and gender identity/expression, 54, 59, 65, UNESCO, UNESCO. UNESCO.
