= John Willmott School =

Community secondary school in Sutton Coldfield, England

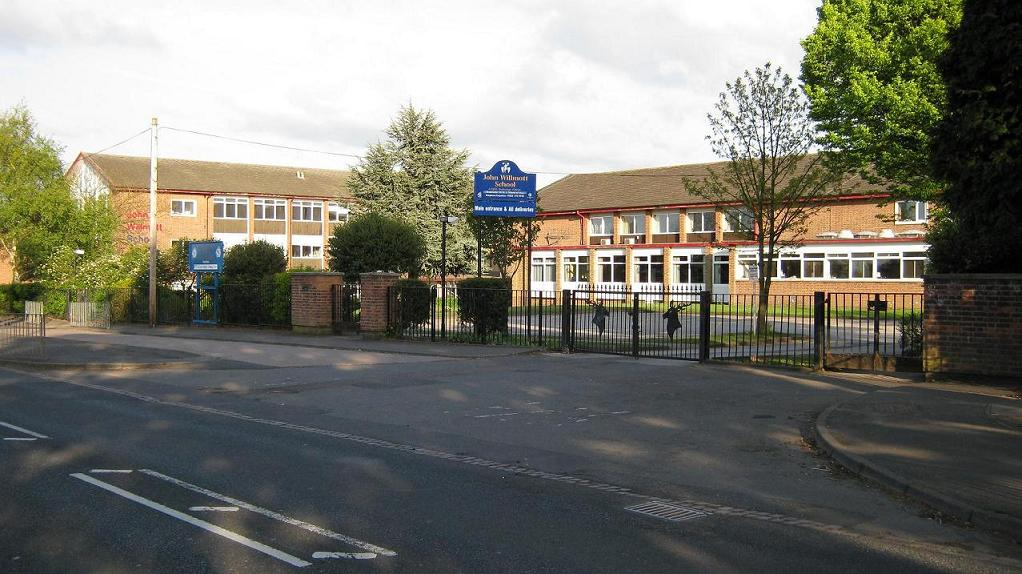

Location
- Reddicap Heath Road; Sutton Coldfield, West Midlands, B75 7DY; England

Information
- Type: Academy
- Motto: "Potential into Reality"
- Established: 1958
- Local authority: Birmingham City Council
- Trust: The Arthur Terry Learning Partnership
- Department for Education URN: 144721 Tables
- Ofsted: Reports
- Headteacher: N Gould
- Gender: Coeducational
- Age: 11 to 16
- Enrolment: 950
- Houses: Spitfire, Wellington, Hurricane & Lancaster
- Website: theroyalsuttonschool.atlp.org.uk

The Royal Sutton School is a coeducational secondary school located in Sutton Coldfield, West Midlands, England. It is part of the Arthur Terry Learning Partnership, a local Multi Academy Trust.

After consultation The Royal Sutton School changed its name from John Wilmott School.

In 2024 JWS achieved 'good' in all areas. Areas of commendation included: a sense of pride among pupils; staff know the pupils well; a wide range of opportunities for pupils to develop and teaching staff have a strong understanding of their subject.

== History ==
John Willmott Grammar School was founded in the name of Alderman John Willmott. It was opened in 1958 as a co-educational grammar school in an award-winning building. The school's last year of selective intake, based on the 12+ test, was 1974. It became a comprehensive and changed its name to John Willmott School in 1975.

The school was awarded specialist status as a Technology College in September 2001.

Previously a community school administered by Birmingham City Council, in July 2019 John Willmott School converted to academy status. The school is now sponsored by the Arthur Terry Learning Partnership.

== Statistics ==
When Ofsted inspected the school in December 2023, it graded achievement and standards as good in all areas. Overall results have improved at a rate faster than the national average, with 2009 results reaching a new high, and the best results in the school's history.

== Sport ==
Football has been the main sport at John Willmott School for the later part of its history, overtaking rugby. Rugby started off as its predominant sport when John Willmott was a grammar school. It has become gradually less popular, but rugby is being re-introduced at the school and an effort is being made to create a new team to represent the school.

Other sports are offered, such as softball, tennis, badminton, trampolining, table tennis, volleyball, athletics, dancing and basketball.

== Notable former pupils ==
- Paul Agnew - international leading tenor
- Tony Capaldi - plays for Northern Premier League Premier Division side Rushall Olympic as a defender
- Amy Jones - English cricketer
- Andrew Moffat - teacher, author and creator of No Outsiders education programme
- Darius Vassell - retired English footballer
- Emma Willis - English television presenter and former model
- Stacey Cadman - English actress
- Ray Smedley - Represented GB in the Munich Olympics in the 1500 metres
- Demi Rose - Model and social media personality
