= Demi Rose =

British model (born 1995)

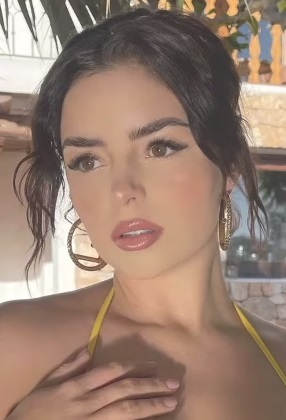
- Mawby in 2021
- Born: Demi Rose Mawby; 27 March 1995 (age 31); Birmingham, West Midlands, England
- Occupations: Model; social media personality
- Years active: 2013–present
- Modeling information
- Height: 157 cm (5 ft 2 in)
- Hair color: Brown
- Eye color: Brown

Demi Rose Mawby (born 27 March 1995) is a British model and social media personality.

== Early life and education ==
Mawby was born on 27 March 1995 in Birmingham, England, and went to John Willmott School for secondary school. She was also a student at Walsall College studying beauty therapy.

== Career ==
Mawby originally grew popular on Myspace before joining Instagram at age 18. She had an account on OnlyFans, an internet content subscription service based in London. Though as of 2025, she has abandoned the platform altogether. In May 2015, she performed as a model in DJ Khaled's song video "How Many Times". She was briefly contracted with Taz's Angels, and left the group in November 2015 to return to the UK.

Mawby has appeared in several nude magazines such as WorldStarHipHop, FHM, Nuts, Zoo, and others. She has landed the cover of Sixty6 magazine in December 2016. She is also a global ambassador of PrettyLittleThing, a UK-based fashion retailer.

In 2017, Rose briefly began her stint as a DJ. She also considered starting an acting career.

== Personal life ==
In 2016, Mawby dated American rapper Tyga. Mawby's father, Barrie Mawby, died in October 2018 from cancer, and her mother, Christine Mawby, died from a stomach infection in June 2019.

Mawby says she is bisexual, stating, "I went through a phase of liking girls more than guys. Now I'm more into guys. It just depends."

== Filmography ==
Music videos
Year	Title	Artists	Album
2015	"How Many Times"	DJ Khaled ft. Chris Brown, Lil Wayne, Big Sean	I Changed a Lot
2017	"More & More"	Tom Zanetti ft. Karen Harding	Non-album single
