= Mark Warby =

British judge (born 1958)

The Right Honourable Sir Mark Warby
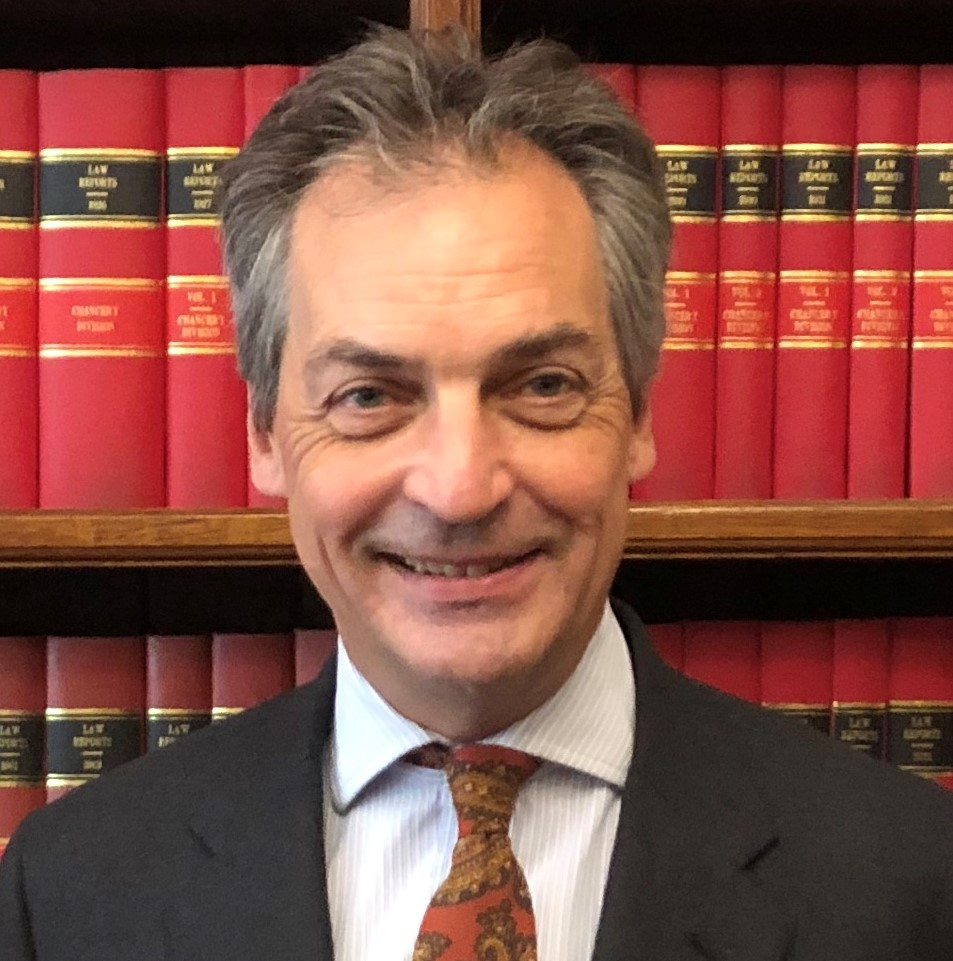

President of the King's Bench Division
- Incumbent
- Assumed office 1 October 2026
- Monarch: Charles III
- Preceded by: Dame Victoria Sharp

Lord Justice of Appeal
- In office 3 February 2021 – 30 September 2026

Justice of the High Court
- In office 10 June 2014 – 3 February 2021

Personal details
- Born: 10 October 1958 (age 67)
- Education: St John's College, Oxford
- Profession: Barrister, judge

Sir Mark David John Warby PC (born 10 October 1958) is an English judge who has served as the President of the King's Bench Division of the High Court of Justice since 2026.

== Career ==
He was educated at Bristol Grammar School and St John's College, Oxford.

He was called to the bar at Gray's Inn in 1981, and appointed Queen's Counsel in 2002. He was a Recorder of the Crown Court (Midland Circuit) from 2009 to 2014. He was selected to present a seminar on media law to the Leveson Inquiry Panel in 2011. In 2013, he was appointed a Deputy High Court Judge and he became a judge of the High Court of Justice (Queen's Bench Division) on 11 June 2014. Following his appointment to the High Court he was awarded the customary knighthood.

In March 2017 he was appointed Judge in Charge of the Media and Communications List.

In March 2018 he was appointed director of Senior Judiciary Training.

In January 2019 he became chair of the High Court Judges’ Association.

In July 2020 his appointment to the Court of Appeal was announced, and took effect on 3 February 2021. He was appointed Senior Judicial Commissioner of the Judicial Appointments Commission for a period of three years from 1 June 2023 until 31 May 2026.

== Publications ==
- The Law of Privacy and the Media: joint editor of second and third editions and a contributor to all three editions.
- Contributor to Blackstone's Guide to the Defamation Act
- Contributor to Sport: Law and Practice
- Gave The Thomas Sutton Lecture 2019 at the Charterhouse on the subject of More and more: law and the Charterhouse in London.

== Honours ==
- He was appointed a Queen's Counsel (QC) on 16 April 2002.
- He was knighted in June 2014. This allowed him to be referred to as Sir Mark Warby.
- He was sworn in as a member of Her Majesty's Most Honourable Privy Council on 10 March 2021 at Windsor Castle. This gave him the Honorific Prefix "The Right Honourable" for life.
