= LGBTQ sex education =

Sex education relevant to those who are LGBTQ+

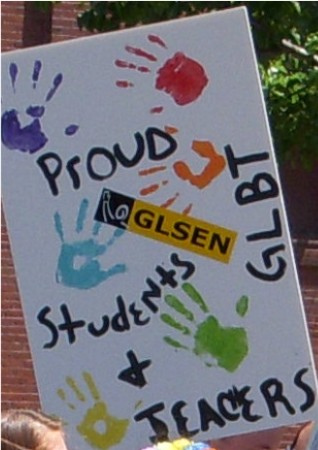
Poster carried in a gay pride march in Portland, Maine

LGBTQ sex education is a sex education program within a school, university, or community center that addresses the sexual health needs of LGBTQ people.

There is some debate about whether LGBTQ sex education should be included in sex education curricula. Advocates of LGBTQ sex education say that the inclusion of LGBTQ issues into sex education programs reduces anti-LGBTQ bullying, improves the health of LGBTQ people, and decreases instances of problems common in LGBTQ students such as depression and low self-esteem.

Opponents argue that LGBTQ sex education programs would force a political point of view on students, misuse tax money, and disrespect religious values.

A 2020 study suggests LGBTQ-inclusive sex education can reduce bullying, improve mental health and reduce suicidality in young LGBTQ people. As of 2014, only 5% of middle and high school students in the United States reported receiving "positive discussions of LGBTQ-related topics" within their health classes.

As of 2025, only 7 states mandate the inclusion of LGBTQ topics in schools, 6 out of the 7 also requiring sex education in their school curriculums.

== Background ==
LGBTQ sex education is currently not covered in many schools. Research has posited that students often do not find existing LGBTQ sex education programs to be effective, although research suggests that states with LGBTQ-inclusive sex education have reduced rates of bullying, better mental health, and reduced risk of suicide in young people. Teachers and parents have differing views on homosexuality, which can directly impact when and how LGBTQ sex education is implemented.

=== Research ===
Multiple studies have concluded that LGBTQ sex education is often not incorporated into school sex education courses and that most students do not receive effective instruction in LGBTQ sexual health issues.

A study involving the review of literature found that although sex education aims to produce well-rounded students with values of safe sex, nondiscriminatory knowledge, and healthy attitudes towards sex, the reality is different. Modern sex education often pushes heterosexual narratives and prevention strategies that lead to young people being less prepared for their future. Inadequate information can be harmful to their futures, as understood by the World Health Organization (WHO). Comprehensive Sexuality Education (CSE), or sex education that covers all areas of sexuality and gender, can be detrimental to the future of students' health. CSE was also found to be effective in building healthy relationships, preventing partner and child violence, advanced knowledge in emotional and social situations, and delayed sexual activity.

Outside of sexual knowledge and relationships, social mindfulness can also be a benefit coming from proper sex education. According to the WHO, the likelihood of sexual activity taking place sooner, because of sex education, is false. Proper sex education provides lifelong impacts that help students to be prepared for sex, rather than inducing it.

Students can learn about sex not only at school, but also at home, through relationships, and in other informal settings. Students often are not educated on LGBTQ sex education until college. Appropriate education can help students navigate these environments, which Jessamyn Bowling found by providing LGBTQ sex education classes to incoming freshman in North Carolina.

In a study conducted by Ellis and High in the UK (2004), 384 students were surveyed; they found that 24% had not received instruction in LGBTQ sex issues. The CDC Division of Adolescent and School Health's study revealed that 48% of schools in the US covered LGBTQ topics. According to research reported by Burston and Hart in 2001, 45% of surveyed students believed that they did not cover LGBT sex education sufficiently in school. Research has also shown that there can be an implicit assumption that all students are heterosexual in sex education classes.

The LGBTQ students in Eleanor Formby's 2011 study of sex education said that they do not always feel welcomed by sex education classes or at school. Sex education courses commonly idealize marriage (not acknowledging that many countries outlaw same-sex marriage), thereby presenting a heterosexual view of sex and relationships as normal. Studies have suggested that sex education programs often do not cover safer sex practices for LGBT individuals.

Some sex education curricula cover LGBTQ issues. For example, the Unitarian Universalist Association of Congregations provides a sex education program called Our Whole Lives, which includes discussion of sexual orientation and presents homosexuality and heterosexuality as equally valid. Our Whole Lives offers programs designed for a range of developmental stages, from Kindergarten-level through adulthood, and follows the "Guidelines for Comprehensive Sexuality Education" that the Sexuality Information and Education Council of the United States (SIECUS) endorses. The United Church of Christ also supports Our Whole Lives.

== Issues with sex education programs ==
Research has illustrated that some sex education courses present LGBTQ issues in a negative light—portraying LGBTQ individuals and LGBTQ sexuality as something wrong, sick, and abnormal. According to the American Civil Liberties Union, "abstinence-only" approaches to sex education can also be alienating to LGBT students because these programs assume that marriage is a possibility and a desire for all students even where same-sex marriage is illegal. Further, promoting marriage as the goal for LGBTQ students reproduces a homonormative standard, marginalizing those without access to or interest in marriage. Ellis and High's survey research in 2004 (including 384 students) revealed that 59% of young people who did receive LGBT sex education found it to be ineffective.

=== Teachers ===
Teachers have been identified as a hindrance to LGBTQ sex education in some studies. Teachers always have their own opinions about homosexuality, and, according to these studies, if teachers have negative views toward LGBTQ individuals, this can come through in their teaching—causing LGBTQ students to feel unaccepted and unsafe. A 2024 survey found that schools often contain harmful language and environments for LGBTQ students, often produced by teachers. According to Ellis and High (2004), when LGBT students receive information about LGBTQ sexuality with negative undertones, they are left feeling significantly worse and more unsafe than if homosexuality were left out of the curriculum. Researchers have documented multiple self-proclaimed "LGBTQ-friendly" teachers whose classrooms actually foster prejudiced lessons. Such teachers are also highly likely to ignore instances of homophobic bullying directed at LGBTQ youth within their classes. Burston and Hart (2001) reported that teachers sometimes believe that they should not take a side on the issue of homosexuality and therefore should not interfere when homophobia occurs in the classroom. According to Formby (2011), even phrasing that subtly casts homosexuality in a negative light can have a detrimental effect on LGBTQ students' experience of sex education.

There have also been issues around teachers feeling free to teach sex education that equally emphasizes both heterosexual and homosexual health information. Deana Morrow's study (1993) reported that some teachers said they were afraid they might be fired if they discussed LGBTQ issues. This fear is linked to the historical misconnection of homosexuality to molestation in the United States; this supposedly natural linkage has been debunked multiple times. Regardless, straight and LGBT teachers alike still experience allegations of molestation when they engage in discussions surrounding sexuality, particularly those discussions that are LGBT related. Teachers can also feel hindered because the school environment is inhospitable to homosexuality; in Burston and Hart's 2001 study, some even said that they were under the impression that the school would not allow them to teach LGBTQ sex education.

Classmates can also be non-receptive toward LGBTQ issues in current sex education courses, and students are often hesitant to talk about homosexuality, according to Buston and Hart (2001).

=== Parents ===
As of 2021, although 85% of parental support in United States high schools are in favor of sexual orientation existing in sex education classes, there are still major discourses on what kind of sex education courses should and should not be relayed to students.

Abstinence-only sex education most commonly includes information on waiting to participate in sex until marriage, instilling moral values with sex- often associated with religion- and pushing anti-contraception narratives to tackle STI and premarital sex rates. However, research suggests that abstinence-only instruction has no affect on adolescent birth rates. This method of instruction is researched to push heteronormativity onto LGBTQ students, leading to isolation and inequitable information about sex.

Prevention-based sex education programs often focus on teen pregnancy and STIs. 26 states across the United States mandate medical validity in sex education, 8 of these states with the expansion of LGBTQ education.

LGBTQ sex education has 66% of parental support as of 2025. However, 91.8% of responding students in 2019 do not have access to sex education that touches on areas regarding the LGBTQ community. Researchers argue that the hesitation for legal and parental action is due to a moral panic surrounding LGBTQ in school communities. Although there is adequate support for sexual orientation to be included in the curriculum for sex education, youth are still faced with insufficient information regarding LGBTQ schooling in all subjects.

Since sex education has been present in health education in schools, many parents expect their children to learn about sex there. Studies show that most families do not engage in conversation about sex in the home, and when they do it is often from a heteronormative perspective. The assumptions of being heterosexual can make LGBTQ people feel ashamed or lacking support from their family. Lack of conversation and knowledge received in the home for LGBTQ people can often lead them to receive their information from outside sources that contain false or misleading information. The same study showed that many parents do not have a solid knowledge base on same-sex or LGBT topics, nor do they know of resources to direct their children towards.

== Proposed LGBTQ sex education programs ==
Advocates for LGBTQ sex education have suggested adjustments to current sex education practices in schools. One common place for improvement that researchers have identified is the angle from which sex education is approached in general. Buston and Hart (2001), Ellis and High (2004), and others have recommended that teachers frame sex education in terms of relationships rather than merely reproduction, which can lead to the exclusion of LGBT students. Ellis and High mention that sexual orientation might be more appropriately taught as "an aspect of culture and identity" (Ellis and High 2004, pg. 11). Other researchers such as Morrow (1993) believe that in order for sex education to be effective, it must present LGB as just as natural and legitimate as heterosexuality. Advocates for LGBTQ sex education ask that LGBTQ sexual health issues be given equal weight in the curriculum accordingly. They also say that more resources concerning LGBTQ sexual health issues need to be made available to students. According to UCLA's Center for the Study of Women's Policy Brief 11 (2012), LGBTQ students may not be willing to reach out for guidance themselves.

Researchers have recommended that teachers in sex education programs avoid framing homosexuality as something that is fundamentally connected to sexually transmitted infections and refrain from practices that are potentially detrimental to LGBTQ students, such as referring to partners as specifically "him" or "her" (better to use the more flexible "they"). Gowen and Winges-Yanez (2014) suggest through their focus groups on LGBTQ teens that there are several problems with the way sex education is taught. The teens cited silencing, heterocentricity, and pathologizing of LGBTQ individuals as common practices. When asked how they would improve sex education, the group said inclusive sex education would include discussion of LGBT issues, learning how to access resources, STI prevention, relationships, and anatomy. Advocates for LGBTQ rights also say that teachers need to abandon any reluctance to take a side in the debate about homosexuality.

There are also alternative sexual education programs for LGBTQ people, such as that of an online sexual education course. According to a study evaluating the effectiveness of an online, interactive sexual education program for LGBT people, all subsections recorded statistically significant improvement of knowledge. Some of the topics included safe sex practices, healthy relationships, pleasures, and sexually transmitted infections. This type of program also created an online community for people taking the course to ask questions and interact with each other. This social aspect of the program also created a sense of normalcy and acceptance. Online programs could offer a means of education for those who cannot receive it in school. There are also various online LGBT sites on the internet that offer educational leaflets or information.

Novels including LGBTQ relationships can be a useful tool in an LGBT inclusive sexual education course or as a way for youth and teens to learn about LGBTQ relationships and issue in a different type of way. Novels that include LGBT relationships can aid in normalizing queer relationships, potentially creating a more accepting and inclusive atmosphere for LGBT youth. It can also supplement information learned by reinforcing it in the form of a story. Many LGBT youth use young adult novels that include LGBT relationships as sources of information, especially if they do not receive sex education in school. Sexually explicit young adult novels can provide details about sexual intercourse, intimacy, and sexual identity that LGBT youth can relate to, allowing them to explore their own sexual identity.

A study of LGBTQ youth asked them what their current curriculum is teaching them and what they would want to see in a new curriculum. Some of the responses included a more inclusive curriculum that described different people with different gender identities, sexual orientations, and ethnicity, "how-to" information that related to LGBTQ people relationships, and specific sections related to LGBT risks, problems, and behaviors. They also mentioned the use of internet information and resources as a way of creating a community for extended education and support.

== Support for LGBTQ sex education ==
Proponents of incorporating LGBTQ sex education into school curricula commonly present several arguments. According to the Huffington Post, some supporters claim that failing to include LGBTQ issues in sex education programs will overlook a significant number of students who identify as LGBT; the Center for American Progress (CAP) says that this can cause them to feel marginalized and removed from the lesson because it does not pertain to them. LGBT sex education advocates also argue that leaving LGBT safe sex instruction out of the curriculum will increase the likelihood of health problems for LGBTQ students. Supporters say that since LGBT people are particularly at risk for HIV/AIDS, it is especially important to provide them with sexual health information. According to researcher Eleanor Formby (2011), lesbian women are a high-risk group for sexually transmitted infections (STIs), because many do not know that they can be susceptible to STIs or how to engage in safe sex. Therefore, it is important that they receive lesbian sex education. LGBTQ sex education advocates suggest that because LGBTQ students are not taught sex education that pertains to them in school, they feel unprepared for sex, unable to talk about it openly, and have to learn about it by themselves—which can result in negative health outcomes. Sanchez (2012) argues that LGBT students are unlikely to reach out to resources that could give them good information on their own, which furthers the need for LGBTQ sex education in schools. LGBTQ youth are also at higher risk of engaging in high-risk behavior such as higher rates of suicide attempts, substance use and high risk sexual behavior. Since many of these high risk actions among LGBTQ youth have been correlated with depression, emotional distress and victimization experiences from non- LGBTQ people, LGBTQ sensitive sex and HIV education in schools could reduce this high-risk behavior by normalizing LGBTQ people and also providing support services to LGBTQ youth.

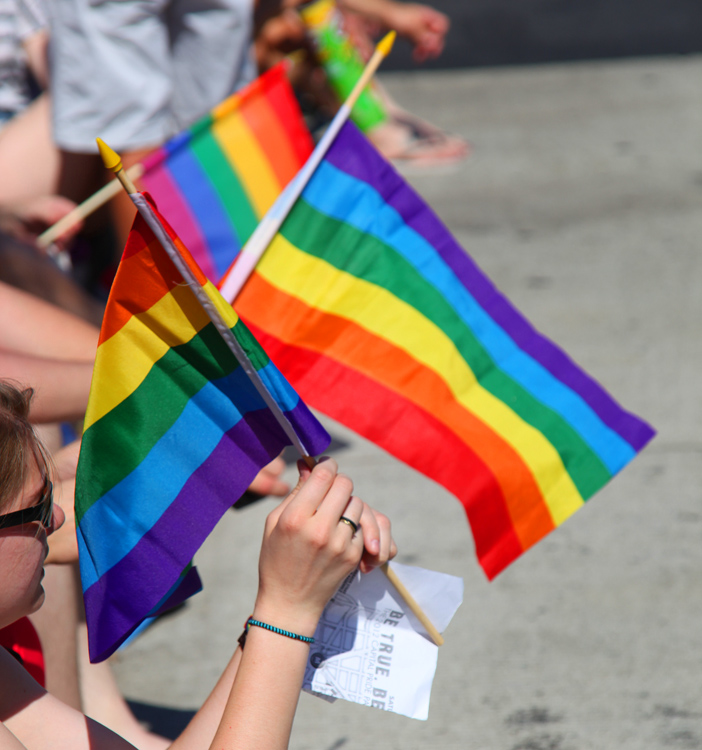
Parade attendees wave rainbow flags at the 2012 Washington, D.C. Capital Pride parade

LGBTQ sex education supporters have also argued that the inclusion of LGBTQ topics in the curriculum can decrease instances of bullying in schools by familiarizing students with the range of sexual orientations and reducing harmful stereotypes. The Center for American Progress argues that LGBTQ sex education results in a decrease in homophobic comments. According to the Huffington Post, supporters say that educating young people about LGBTQ individuals could help them have a more positive attitude toward their gay peers. The Center for American Progress (2013) says that LGBT sex education would therefore reduce common problems LGBTQ students face as a result of negative attitudes; these include mental health issues like depression, the risk of suicide, drug abuse, self-esteem issues, and poorer academic performance due to stress caused by discrimination. They argue that covering homosexuality in sex education programs helps students feel more secure at school.

Several studies have also shown that heteronormative and negative attitudes toward LGBTQ people are associated with lower rates of academic success. In schools, heteronormative and non inclusive culture can poorly effect motivation, health, and learning habits in students who identify as LGBTQ+. Andreas Gegenfurtner and Markus Gebhardt have shared findings which suggest that tolerance and acceptance toward sexual minorities were reported to be more positive when people are more highly educated and less religious. Similar findings within their study have shown a positive correlation between academic success among LGBTQ+ students and inclusive school environments.

According to Jen Gilbert, associate professor of education at York University, young LGBTQ people often do not have queer parents whom they can ask for sexuality-related advice, nor access to LGBTQ adults. LGBTQ sex education could potentially fill this gap and provide LGBTQ students with elders well-versed in their specific needs and equipped with affirming information, that students are otherwise unable to receive at home or in school.

Finally, proponents of LGBTQ sex education have said that curricula that explore all facets of sexuality would be beneficial to straight students as well, because they claim that it presents a more accurate picture of the world and human sexuality. A study of Gay/Straight Alliances in Utah found that peer-facilitated discussions concerning the spectrum of sexuality and gender identities benefited both straight and LGBT students. It exposed them to the reality of relationships outside of the heteronormative images that dominate media (as well as sex education), and even positively impacted all involved students' academic performance. Proponents also argue that offering LGBT-inclusive sex education can be of major assistance to any questioning students that might be in the class.

According to the Center for American Progress (2013), the majority of parents support including homosexuality in the sex education curriculum; they report that 73% of high school parents think LGBT issues should be taught. The CAP claims that this high percentage of support indicates that LGBT topics should be incorporated.

=== Support within the United States ===
Eight states have a sexual health curriculum that affirms LGBTQ+ people. These states are California, Oregon, Nevada, Colorado, Illinois, New Jersey, Hawaii, and Connecticut.

Planned Parenthood is an organization in the United States that advocates for LGBTQ youth and access to LGBTQ sex education. Information on their website is available for updated information on laws, education and services for safe sex, and over 500 centers across the US.

==== California Healthy Youth Act ====
In 2016, the California Healthy Youth Act stated that all sexual health education in California districts must be inclusive of LGBTQ students. This requires schools to discuss examples of same-sex relationships and teach about different gender identities. School districts must protect LGBTQ students from harassment and prevent discrimination against them. Parents are not allowed to "opt-out" specifically from the LGBTQ-related content because this would be considered discrimination.

=== Support outside of the United States ===
==== Netherlands ====
Students at the age of four in the Netherlands are introduced to age-appropriate topics of sex education. As students get older, the information matures, with an in-depth awareness of body parts, reproduction, and areas of safe sex. LGBTQ sex education begins at age eight, where topics involving gender and stereotypes are covered.

==== Porto, Portugal ====
In September 2025, the Porto Proclamation on Sexual Health, Rights, and Justice was implemented in Porto, Portugal. This proclamation's goal is to reinforce services and laws in place, nationally and globally to advocate for sexual health as a human right.

==== Scotland ====
Legal application in Scotland of LGBTQ+ education began, as one of the first countries in Europe, before 2015. All public schools are required to learn more about areas of LGBTQ in all areas of study, including sex education. The HIV/AIDs epidemic in the 1980s, LGBTQ marriage and parenting, and stereotypes are all areas covered in public education.

== Opposition to LGBTQ sex education ==
Opponents of LGBTQ sex education argue that it is wrong to teach students about the issue of homosexuality because it is too contentious. They say that parents should have control over what their children are exposed to and taught, and allowing public schools to cover LGBT sex education would undermine this right, forcing a particular political view on students. Furthermore, many opponents of inclusive sex ed programs argue that parents are forced to lose control of what their children learn in school. This belief is especially common in households that are religiously affiliated, or identify politically with views against LGBT rights. According to The Christian Post, some parents do not want their children to study homosexuality. Critics often cite a misuse of citizens' tax dollars, claiming citizens should not have to pay for children to learn about other lifestyles that their parents do not agree with. Parents and guardians within these families commonly argue that lesbian, gay, bisexual, or transgender activity is immoral, abnormal, and unnatural.

According to Formby (2011), opponents have also argued that LGBTQ sex education is harmful to students because they say it exposes them to damaging information. They claim that the students should not learn about LGBT issues until they are older. Some opponents of LGBTQ sex education have argued that including LGBTQ issues in sex education programs will encourage more young people to practice homosexuality as well. LGBT sex education has also been accused of being disrespectful to certain families' religious beliefs. The Christian Post argued that if schools elect to teach about LGBTQ people while neglecting religious topics, the curriculum would be unfairly balanced.

There have also been concerns that LGBTQ sex education would not be effective because it is difficult for homophobic students to accept homosexuality, which may prevent them from being receptive to the instruction.

=== Opposition within the United States ===
Trumps administration in 2025 tried to prohibit funding- authorized by Congress- from sex education, and issued a removal of educating gender diversity in schools in the United States However this action was stopped by a judge in Oregon who filed a lawsuit arguing that pulling funding was backed by no scientific evidence.

There are laws prohibiting the "promotion of sexuality", referred to as "No Promo Homo" laws. Four states (Louisiana, Mississippi, Oklahoma, and Texas) mandate pointedly negative messages regarding all LGBT identities, when sex education is provided. Eight states (the four previously mentioned, Alabama, Arizona, South Carolina, and Utah) prohibit discussion of any topics deemed LGBT-related. According to the Guttmacher Institute's findings in 2017, "If HIV education is taught in Arizona it cannot 'promote' a 'homosexual lifestyle' or portray homosexuality in a positive manner. Mandated HIV education in Oklahoma teaches that among other behaviors that 'homosexual activity' is considered to be 'responsible for contact with the AIDS virus'." Utah, Alabama and Arizona used to have "No Homo Promo" laws but they were since repealed.

== Laws and legal battles ==
=== Section 28 ===
Section 28 was a controversial law in the United Kingdom that barred schools from presenting homosexuality as a viable sexual orientation or basis for relationships (though the law was never used in court). It was enacted in 1988 and repealed throughout the UK by 2003. Critics of Section 28 say that the law prevented teachers from intervening in instances of homophobic bullying and greatly hindered the development of gay rights in Great Britain. According to Moran (2001), proponents of the law argued that it protected students from being harmed by gay propaganda. Recently, LGBT advocates have raised concerns that policies similar to Section 28 are appearing again in British schools. Wales has sought to challenge the implications of this section by implementing a new education curriculum Relationships and Sexuality Education (RSE) by 2022. The goals of this new curriculum will be to broaden traditional sex education and include information relating to relationships and a greater understanding of sexuality. It will also include LGBTQI topics such as gender identity and bring up issues of consent and sexual violence. The new curriculum will be required in primary and secondary schools with each containing different curriculum focuses, but it will not be required by religious schools.

=== Croatian textbook ===
In 2009, the European Committee of Social Rights found several statements in a Croatian mandatory Biology course textbook, including: "Many individuals are prone to sexual relations with persons of the same sex.... It is believed that parents are to blame because they impede their children's correct sexual development with their irregularities in family relations. Nowadays it has become evident that homosexual relations are the main culprit for increased spreading of sexually transmitted diseases (e.g. AIDS)," and "The disease [AIDS] has spread amongst promiscuous groups of people who often change their sexual partners. Such people are homosexuals because of sexual contacts with numerous partners, drug addicts...and prostitutes." The European Committee of Social Rights deemed these statements discriminatory and in violation of Croatia's obligations under the European Social Charter.

== Among minority groups ==
=== CDC findings ===
A 2018 CDC study has maintained that Latino and black youth and young adult men who have sex with men often face stigma, discrimination, and language barriers that hinder their ability to access STI education, prevention, and treatment. As a result, they are vulnerable to high rates of HIV and other health disparities. In 2017, African Americans accounted for 43% of all new HIV diagnoses. Additionally, Hispanic/Latinos are also strongly affected. They accounted for 26% of all new HIV diagnoses. In 2017, gay and bisexual men accounted for 66% of all HIV diagnoses in the United States and 6 dependent areas.

=== Structural barriers ===
One case study has demonstrated that homophobia, racism, coupled with financial hardship and social support were associated with higher exposure to HIV among homosexual men of color. In the United States, Latino men who have sex with men (MSM) are disproportionately affected by HIV. Another study demonstrated that in a multivariable analysis, increasing age, low income, and queer identity. Additionally, people Living With HIV, MSM and transgender women are considered the "most in need" due to the stigma that prevents them from accessing high-quality health care, prevention, and sex education. According to Mattew E. Levy of The George Washington University, many systematic factors have led to the disproportionate rates of HIV among Black and Latino Men who have sex with men, including insufficient healthcare, social stigma and discrimination, incarceration, and poverty. Men of color who have sex with men experience inadequate access to culturally competent services, stigma and discrimination that impede access to services, a deficiency of services in correctional institutions, and limited services in areas where they live.

== See also ==
- Adolescent sexuality
- Comprehensive sex education § Inclusive ways of delivering CSE
- Education and the LGBTQ community
- LGBTQ rights by country or territory
- LGBTQ social movements
- List of universities with BDSM clubs
- Queer migration
- Religion and LGBTQ people
- Sex education in the United States
- Sexual revolution
- Social conservatism
