= Anderton Park Primary School =

Primary school in England

Coordinates: 52.4513°N 1.8750°W

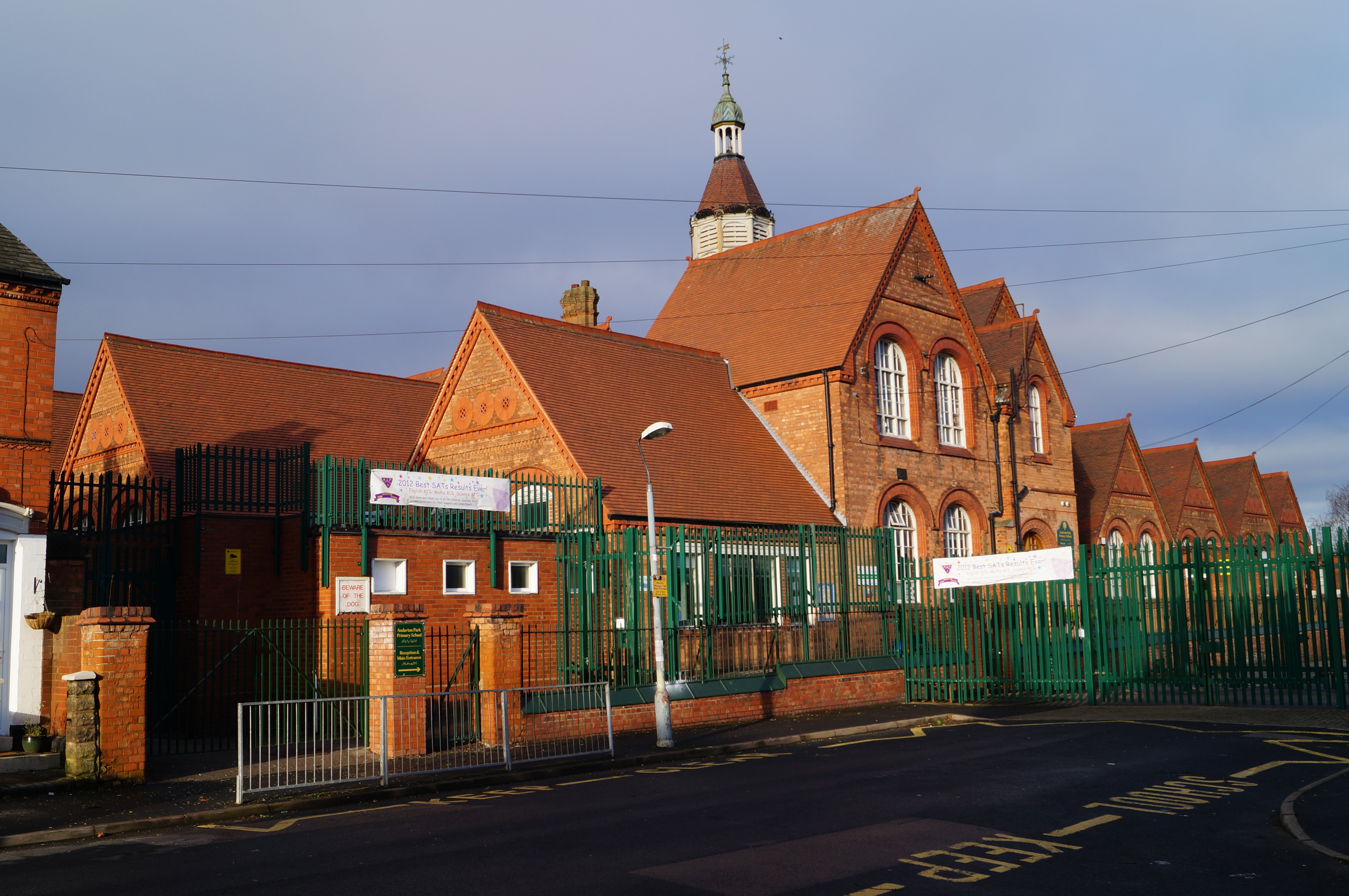

Location
- Dennis Road; Sparkhill; Birmingham, West Midlands, B12 8BL; England

Information
- Type: Community school
- Local authority: Birmingham City Council
- Department for Education URN: 103192 Tables
- Ofsted: Reports
- Headteacher: Sarah Hewitt-Clarkson
- Gender: Coeducational
- Age: 3 to 11
- Website: https://www.andertonparkschool.org/

Anderton Park Primary School is a coeducational primary school located in the Sparkhill area of Birmingham, in the county of the West Midlands, England.

It is a community school administered by Birmingham City Council.

It was built by Martin and Chamberlain for the Birmingham School Board as "Dennis Road School" in 1896. On 20 January 2011 it became a Grade II listed building. In 2019, it became the focus of campaigners opposed to LGBT representation in Sex and Relationship Education lessons. These campaigners mounted a sustained demonstration outside the gates of the school before being stopped by the High Court, as of 2021, the school still teaches materials containing references to LGBT groups.

The school is mentioned in official accounts relating to the so-called Trojan Horse scandal.
