= Age of consent in Europe =

Legal ages for sexual activities in Europe

Ages of consent in Europe 14 15 16 17 18 Dependent on marital status

The age of consent for sex outside of marriage varies by jurisdiction across Europe. The age of consent – the age from which one is deemed able to consent to having sex with anyone else of consenting age or above – varies between 14 and 18. Most of the countries set their ages in the range of 14 to 16; only four countries: Cyprus (17), the Republic of Ireland (17), Turkey (18), and the Vatican City (18), set an unrestricted age of consent higher than 16. Some countries have close-in-age exceptions, enabling partners close in age, one or both of whom may be below the standard unrestricted age of consent, to legally consent to engage in sexual acts with each other.

The highlighted age is that from which a young person can lawfully engage in a non-commercial sexual act with an older person, regardless of their age difference. If a participant in a sexual act is under 18 but above the age of consent then sexual acts with another person who is at or over the age of consent may still be illegal if the older participant is in a position of authority over the younger, as in the case of a teacher and their student or a police officer and a civilian. Sexual acts may not be legal if those engaging are blood relatives, regardless of age, though the legality of incest varies between European countries.

== International obligations ==
Neither the European Union nor the Council of Europe have suggested any specific age of consent, and there has not been any effort so far to standardise the age across member states. However, most countries in Europe now have binding legal obligations in regard to the sexual abuse of children under 18. The Lanzarote Convention, which was ratified, as of 2021, by all member states of the Council of Europe, and which came into effect in 1 July 2010, obliges the countries that ratify it to criminalise certain acts concerning children under 18, such as the involvement of such children in prostitution and pornography. Other acts that must be criminalised include:

Engaging in sexual activities with a child ('child' is defined in Article 3 as 'person under the age of 18 years') where:

- Use is made of coercion, force or threats; or
- Abuse is made of a recognised position of trust, authority or influence over the child, including within the family; or
- Abuse is made of a particularly vulnerable situation of the child, notably because of a mental or physical disability or a situation of dependence.

The age of consent is called "the legal age for sexual activities" and must be chosen by states at the age they see fit. (No specific age is recommended.) As of February 2021, the convention has been ratified by all states of the Council of Europe. In the European Union (EU 27), there is a directive regarding the sexual abuse of children under 18, known as Directive 2011/92/EU of the European Parliament and of the Council of 13 December 2011 on combating the sexual abuse and sexual exploitation of children and child pornography.

== Albania ==
Since 2001, the age of consent in Albania is 14, regardless of gender and sexual orientation. In the case of a girl, however, sex is illegal if she is over 14 but has not reached "sexual maturity", as provided by article 100 of the criminal code.

== Andorra ==
The age of consent in Andorra is 16. On July 15, 2026, the General Council increased the age of consent from 14 to 16, and it was sanctioned and published in the BOPA on August 13. A close in age exception of three years remains in place for 14-15 year olds. It is also illegal – regardless of age – for a person occupying a position of authority or superiority over a person to engage in sexual activity with them, or when it involves abuse of trust, or a situation of need or dependence. The penalty is more severe when the subject is below the age of 18. Sexual acts with anyone younger than 16 is punishable with imprisonment between six months and four years. If the sexual act involved sexual penetration, then the punishment is imprisonment between four and ten years.

The age of consent of Andorra, its restrictions and its punishments are described in Article 162 and 163 of the Penal Code.

== Armenia ==
The age of consent in Armenia is 16.

Sexual intercourse or other sexual acts with a person obviously under 16, by a person who reached 18 years of age, in the absence of elements of crime envisaged in Articles 138, 139 or 140 of this Code, is punished with correctional labour for the term of up to 2 years, or with imprisonment for the term of up to 2 years.

— Article 141, "Sexual acts with a person under 16"

== Austria ==
The general age of consent in Austria is 14, as specified by § 206 of the penal code. (The term unmündig is specified in § 74 of the penal code.) § 206 (4) defines a close-in-age exception, lowering the age of consent to 13 if the other party is not more than 3 years older and some additional conditions are met. § 207 (4) increases this exception to 4 years, with a minimum age of 12, for sexual acts not amounting to sexual intercourse or other acts "that can be equated with sexual intercourse" - essentially non-penetrative sexual contact. It is subject to the same additional conditions of § 206 (for example, that the act does not cause serious bodily harm).

However, § 207b of the penal code contains an exception to the general age of consent: if one of the partners is younger than 16 years of age and "not sufficiently mature to understand the significance of the act", then the act is punishable.

The offence "initiating sexual contacts with minors under 14 through the use of computer system" is punishable by two years' imprisonment (§ 208a Penal Code).

=== History ===
The Austrian Criminal Code previously specified 18 as the age of consent for male homosexual sex in which the other partner was aged 14 to 18, while no equivalent provision existed for heterosexual sexual conduct or in regards to female homosexuality; this was Section 209 of the Criminal Code. In November 1996, an amendment was put before the Austrian Parliament to remove Section 209; the vote ended in a draw, and the amendment failed to pass. In July 1998, a similar amendment was put forward; it was voted down by the conservative majority. Section 209 came into force when homosexuality between males became legal in 1971. On 24 June 2002, the Austrian Constitutional Court ruled that Section 209 was unconstitutional. The Section was later repealed on 14 August 2002. On 9 January 2003, the European Court of Human Rights held, in L & V v Austria, that Section 209 violated Articles 8 and 14 of the European Convention on Human Rights.

== Azerbaijan ==
The age of consent in Azerbaijan is 16.

Sexual intercourse with the person below the age of 16 years, as well as the same offences linked with satisfaction of sexual passion in perverted forms shall be punished by imprisonment up to 3 years.

— National Laws, Article 152

== Belarus ==
The age of consent in Belarus is 16, according to the Belarus Criminal Code.

Articles

Sexual relations, sodomy, lesbian acts or other actions of sexual character of an adult, reached eighteen years of age, with a person who obviously has not reached sixteen years of age, at absence of attributes of the crimes stipulated by articles 166 and 167 present codes, are punished by restriction of freedom of two years to four years or by imprisonment of two years to five years.

— Belarus Criminal Code, Article 168

Dissolute actions accomplished by a person, reached eighteen years of age, concerning a person who obviously has not reached sixteen years of age, at absence of attributes of the crimes stipulated by articles 166, 167 and 168 present codes, are punished by arrest of about six months or imprisonment of one year to three years.

— Belarus Criminal Code, Article 169

== Belgium ==
The age of consent in Belgium is 16, as specified by Article 133 of the Criminal Code. There is a close-in-age exemption of three years’ age difference for sexual acts where at least one of the partners is 14 or 15.

=== History ===
The Belgian Criminal Code previously specified an age of consent of 18 for homosexual sex. This provision – Article 372bis – was added in 1965 and repealed in 1985.

== Bosnia and Herzegovina ==
The age of consent is 15 since September 2025, when it raised from 14.

== Bulgaria ==
The age of consent in Bulgaria is 16.

Whoever commits an act with the aim of arousing or satisfying sexual desire without intercourse with respect to a person under the age of 16 shall be punished for fornication by imprisonment for one to six years.

(2) (Amended - SG, No. 107/1996, For fornication the punishment shall be imprisonment for a term of two to ten years, when committed: 1. by use of force or threat; 2. by rendering the victim helpless; 3. by taking advantage of the victim's helpless state; 4. by using a position of dependence or supervision;

5. in relation to a person engaged in prostitution. .

— Article 149

(1) A person who has sexual intercourse with a person who has not completed the age of 16 years, insofar as the act does not constitute a crime under Article 152, shall be punished by imprisonment for two to six years.

— Article 151

== Croatia ==
The age of consent for all sexual conduct in Croatia under the Criminal Code in force since 1 January 2013 is 15, regardless of gender and/or sexual orientation, and is regulated by Article 158.

- (1) Whoever performs sexual intercourse with a child under fifteen years of age or induces a child to commit sexual intercourse with a third person, shall be liable to a term of imprisonment of three to twelve years.
- (2) Whoever commits a lewd act with a child under fifteen years of age or induces a child to commit a lewd act on itself or with a third person, shall be punished by imprisonment for a term between one and eight years.

However, there is a close-in-age exemption of three years.

=== History ===
Before the year 2013, the legal age of consent in Croatia was 14. Homosexual acts were illegal until 1977, when Croatia, then as a Yugoslav Federal Republic, changed its Penal Code. The age of consent was equalised in 1998.

== Cyprus ==
The age of consent for all sexual conduct in Cyprus under the 2002 Criminal Code is 17, regardless of sexual orientation or gender.

=== History ===
Until 1998, homosexual acts between men were entirely forbidden under Section 171 (1929). In 1989, Alecos Modinos, president of the Cypriot Gay Liberation Movement, brought a case to the European Court of Human Rights. In 1993, the Court held that the prohibition of homosexual acts was a violation of Article 8. In January 1995, the Cypriot Government introduced a Bill in the Cypriot Parliament that would have abolished the ban. Strong opposition from the Eastern Orthodox Church meant the Bill stalled when referred to the Parliament's Legal Affairs Committee. The European Commission repeated its warning that Cyprus must follow the Court's ruling. In May 1997, again a government measure to repeal the ban failed because of the strength of the opposition. In April 1998, the Council of Europe set a deadline for compliance of 29 May 1998 and on 21 May 1998, the House of Representatives voted 36 to 8 in favour of legalising homosexual acts. However, it was set at 18 while heterosexual acts remained at 16.

In 2002, under pressure from the EU, the parliament finally ended the disparate provisions and changed the age of consent to 17 for both heterosexual and homosexual acts, under the revised Criminal Code.

=== Akrotiri and Dhekelia ===
For both of these Sovereign Base Areas (British military enclaves) on the island of Cyprus, the age of consent is 16.

=== Northern Cyprus ===
Northern Cyprus (areas of the Republic of Cyprus that are occupied by Turkey after the Turkish invasion of Cyprus) has an age of consent of 16 as designated in the Penal Code (Ceza Yasası, Art. 153 & 154).

Article 153 criminalizes penetrative sexual acts with anyone under 16, punishable by up to life imprisonment. Article 154 separately criminalizes non-penetrative sexual contact with a child under 16 by a person over 18, punishable by up to 6 years. Both articles include a close-in-age exception for offenders under 18: for non-penetrative contact (Art. 154), no offense is committed if the age gap is 2 years or less; for penetrative acts (Art. 153), the same age gap reduces the charge to a minor offense (up to 2 years or a fine) rather than clearing it entirely. These exceptions don't apply if force or threats were used.

==== History ====
Prior to 2014, sodomy was illegal, the age of consent only applied to females and sexual contact with a female between the ages of 13 and 16 was a misdemeanor. As of 2014, the age of consent is 16 for both males and females, sexual contact with any child under 16 regardless of gender is a felony and the ban on sodomy is lifted, thereby legalising homosexual sex.

== Czech Republic ==
The age of sexual consent in the Czech Republic is 15.

Additionally, the section of the Czech penal code 40/2009 Sb. covering "crimes against family and children" contains § 202 which criminalises a "seduction to sexual intercourse" of any persons under 18 years by any promise or provision of payment, benefit, privilege or profit, for sexual intercourse, masturbation, exposure or similar behaviour. This regulation was added to the old Czechoslovak penal code (140/1961 Sb.) adopted by the Czech Republic as § 217a by the amendment Czech act No. 218/2003 Sb. effective from 2004 January 1. This also covers cases when there is any kind of trust or dependence, for example, teacher-student, employer-employee.

=== History ===
The age limit in the Austrian Empire was 14 years under § 128 of the Empire's Penal Code of 1852. Homosexual sexual intercourse and sexual intercourse with animals were generally grouped in as "crime against nature" by § 131.historic The Austrian Penal Code was replaced in Czechoslovakia in 1950. The Czechoslovak Penal Code 86/1950 Sb. in § 239 raised the limit to 15 years. Almost identical regulation was contained in the Czechoslovak penal code under 140/1961 Sb., which in § 242 reads: "A person who has coitus with a person under fifteen (15) years of age or who sexually abuses such a person in any other way shall be sentenced to imprisonment for at least one and at most eight years." The new Czech Penal Code (40/2009 Sb., effective from 2010 January 1) contains a similar regulation: § 187. Around 2008 and 2009, the lowering of the limits of criminal responsibility as well as sex acts age limits from 15 to 14 years was passed in Parliament in the new Penal Code 40/2009 Sb. effective from 1 January 2010. Both changes were criticised. Before coming into effect, the amendment act 306/2009 Sb. changed both limits back to 15 years.

Until 1962, homosexual sexual intercourse was illegal in Czechoslovakia. The Czechoslovak 140/1961 Sb., Penal Code, introduced in that year, still contained as a crime "Sexual intercourse with a person of the same sex" (§ 244), but covered only persons older than 18 years of age who had intercourse with a person younger than 18. Between adults, payment receipt or provision and public nuisance were criminalised. In 1990, article § 244 was repealed in its entirety by the Czechoslovak Act 175/1990 Sb., from 1990-07-01.

== Denmark ==
The age of consent in the Kingdom of Denmark is 15, by the Danish Penal Code. It is also illegal to have sexual intercourse with a child younger than 18, if the child is their adopted child, stepchild or foster child, or if they are responsible for their education or upbringing. This includes teachers. To grossly exploit ones age and experience based superiority to seduce a minor for intercourse is also illegal. The laws in the autonomous territories Faroe Islands and Greenland are equivalent although regulated in separate penal codes.

Whoever has sexual intercourse with a child under the age of 15, shall be punished by imprisonment for up to 8 years, unless the situation is covered by § 216 paragraph 2. ... In determining the penalty, it shall be an aggravating circumstance if the perpetrator has gained intercourse by exploiting his physical or mental superiority.
Den, som har samleje med et barn under 15 år, straffes med fængsel indtil 8 år, medmindre forholdet er omfattet af § 216, stk. 2. ... Ved fastsættelse af straffen efter stk. 1 skal det indgå som en skærpende omstændighed, at gerningsmanden har skaffet sig samlejet ved udnyttelse af sin fysiske eller psykiske overlegenhed.

— Danish Penal Code, Article 222

Any person who has sexual intercourse with any child under 18, who is said person's adopted child, stepchild or foster child, or who is entrusted to said person for education or upbringing, will be liable to imprisonment for any term not exceeding four years. ... The same punishment applies to those, who by grossly abusing their age and experience based superiority seduces a person less than 18 years for intercourse.
Den, som har samleje med en person under 18 år, der er den skyldiges stedbarn eller plejebarn eller er betroet den pågældende til undervisning eller opdragelse, straffes med fængsel indtil 4 år. ... Med samme straf anses den, som under groft misbrug af en på alder og erfaring beroende overlegenhed forfører en person under 18 år til samleje.

— Danish Penal Code, Article 223

=== History ===
In 1969, Denmark became the first country to legalise pictorial pornography. This did not affect laws related to the age of people participating in its production. Consequently, the legal age of consent (15) equalled the limit for pornography produced within the country, but material produced in other countries (where the Danish consent law does not apply) was not covered and therefore legal. In 1980 it became illegal to sell, spread or possess pornography involving children under the age of 15, regardless of its country of origin (Danish Penal Code §235). The limit was later changed to 18 years, which is the standing law today, although it remains legal for a person over the age of 15 to take their own nude photos, as long as they are only shared with friends (for example with a boyfriend or girlfriend), the receiver explicitly has received the right to possess them, and they are not shared or spread any further. In the period between the legalisation of pornography and the 1980 amendment to the Danish Penal Code, some companies (infamously Color Climax) exploited the lack of age restrictions on material produced in other countries.

== Estonia ==
The age of consent in Estonia is 16, as specified by Section 145 of the Criminal Code of Republic of Estonia (sexual intercourse or other act of sexual nature with a child), which reads: "(1) Engaging in sexual intercourse or any other acts of sexual nature with a person under sixteen years of age by an adult person, unless the age difference between the adult person and the person between fourteen and sixteen years of age is not more than five years, is punishable by up to five years' imprisonment." Aggravated circumstances exist if the child is under 14 or if the perpetrator is a repeat offender. The most serious punishment is if the victim is under 10 years of age, as Section 147 states: "Within the meaning of the offences provided for in this Subchapter [Subchapter 7 Offences against Sexual Self-determination], a person is deemed to be incapable to comprehend if he or she is less than ten years of age."

The age of consent was raised from 14 to 16 in June 2022 (with a close in age exemption of 5 years set for those aged 14 and 15).

=== History ===
Until 1992, male homosexual sex was illegal, the Estonian SSR Penal Code, Article 118, forbidding "anal intercourse between men". When regaining independence from USSR in 1991, the age of consent for male homosexual intercourse was set at 16, whereas the age for heterosexual intercourse with women was 14. There was no age of consent for heterosexual intercourse with men. The age of consent was harmonised in 2002 when Estonia adopted its first Penal Code after restoring its independence, specifying an equal age of consent at 14 years.

This later being raised to 16 years, regardless of gender or sexual orientation, under a new law, which went into effect throughout Estonia, in June 2022.

== Finland ==
The age of consent in Finland is 16, as specified by Section 6(1) (Sexual abuse of a child), which reads: "A person who has sexual intercourse with a child younger than sixteen years of age ... shall be sentenced for sexual abuse of a child to imprisonment for at most four years."

The sexual act may not be punishable if "there is no great difference in the ages or the mental and physical maturity of the persons involved".

The age is 18 when in connection with a person who has some formal power over the young person, like a school teacher.

=== History ===
Until 1971, homosexual acts were prohibited. After decriminalisation, the age of consent was set to 18 for homosexual acts and 16 for heterosexual acts. In 1999, the age of consent was harmonised at 16 for all sexual acts.

==== Åland Islands ====
According to the Åland Treaty, Finnish national law is applied as the minimum standard. The age of consent is therefore 16.

== France ==
The minimum age of consent in France is 15, as specified by Article 227–25 of the Penal Code, which reads: "Except in the cases of rape or sexual assault provided for in Section 3 of Chapter II of this Title, the committing of sexual acts with a minor under the age of fifteen, for an adult, is punishable by seven years' imprisonment and a fine of €150,000."

Article 222-22 defines sexual assault as "any sexual assault committed with violence, coercion, threat, or surprise". Article 222–22–1 then specifies that coercion can be either physical or moral. The moral coercion or surprise may result from the authority of law or fact that an adult has over a minor, and this de facto authority "may be characterized by a significant age difference between the minor victim and the adult perpetrator".

Article 227–22 prohibits "promoting or attempting to promote the corruption of a minor", as well as "organizing meetings involving indecent exposure or sexual relations knowing that minors are present or participating". (Minors refers to under 15s; the text of the article can be subject to interpretation).

Article 227–22–1 prohibits the "soliciting of a minor under the age of fifteen, or a person pretending to be such minor, for sexual purposes through the use of a computer system".

Article 227–27 prohibits sexual relations with minors over age 15 (aged 15, 16 or 17) "1° where they are committed by an ascendant or by any other person having a legal or factual authority over the victim; 2° where they are committed by a person abusing the authority conferred by his functions."

In 2021 the French law was amended so that any sexual activity with a person below 15 is automatically classified as rape or sexual assault, unless the other party is within five years of age as per a Romeo and Juliet clause; however, this five-year exception was not extended to Article 227–25, which carries a potential seven-year sentence of imprisonment. Additionally, the law categorises as rape any sex with a relative below 15 years of age.

=== History ===
Male homosexual acts were illegal until 1791, when the ancient sodomy laws were dropped from the Criminal Code of that year. This continued to be the case under the Napoleonic Code of 1810.

The age of consent was set at 11 in 1832 and at 13 in 1863. In 1942, the age of consent for homosexual acts was set at 21, while for heterosexual acts it was still 13. The latter was increased to 15 in 1945. In 1974, the age for homosexual acts was lowered to 18. In 1982, it was further lowered to 15, in line with that for heterosexual acts.

== Georgia ==
The age of consent in Georgia is 16 as per Article 140 and 141 of the Georgian Penal Code.

== Germany ==
The age of consent in Germany is 14, as long as a person over the age of 21 does not exploit a 14-to-15-year-old person's lack of capacity for sexual self-determination, in which case a conviction of an individual over the age of 21 requires a complaint from the younger individual; being over 21 and engaging in sexual relations with a minor of the age of 14 or 15 does not constitute an offence by itself. Otherwise the age of consent is 16 for most purposes, although some provisions against abuse do apply beyond this age; under Section 182(1), it is illegal to engage in sexual activity with a person under 18 "by taking advantage of an exploitative situation".)

This is specified by Sections 176 (sexual abuse of children), 180 (promotion of sex of minors) and 182 (sexual abuse of youths) of the Penal Code, which read:

§ 176: "(1) Punished by imprisonment at least one year (and not more than fifteen years pursuant to § 38) shall whoever

1. commits sexual acts on a person under fourteen (14) years of age (a child) or allows them to be committed on themself by the child,
2. induces a child to commit sexual acts on a third person or to allow them to be committed on the person by a third person, or ..."

§ 180: "(1) Whoever abets the commission of sexual acts of a person under sixteen years of age on or in front of a third person or sexual acts of a third person on a person under sixteen years of age":

1. by acting as an intermediary; or
2. by furnishing or creating an opportunity,

shall be punished with imprisonment for not more than three years or a fine. ..."

§ 182: "(3) A person over twenty-one years of age who abuses a person under sixteen years of age, in that he:

1. commits sexual acts on the person or allows them to be committed on himself by the person; or
2. induces the person to commit sexual acts on a third person or to allow them to be committed on the person by a third person,

and thereby exploits the victim's lack of capacity for sexual self-determination, shall be punished with imprisonment for not more than three years or a fine. ... The act shall only be prosecuted upon complaint, unless the prosecuting authority considers ex officio that it is required to enter the case because of the special public interest therein. ... The court may dispense with punishment pursuant to these provisions if, in consideration of the conduct of the person against whom the act was directed, the wrongfulness of the act is slight."

=== History ===
The current rules for age of consent in Germany were set following a post-reunification penal law reform in 1994. The ages of 14 and 16 had been relevant since the Criminal Code for the German Empire came into force in 1872: under § 176, sexual acts with children under 14 were illegal and have been always since. Under § 182, seduction of an "unblemished girl under the age of 16" was prosecuted upon complaint of parents or legal guardian only. In West Germany the latter rule was kept, with minor changes in 1973: unblemishedness was no longer required, and the court could refrain from punishment if the offender was under 21 years of age. The German Democratic Republic, by contrast, created a new socialist criminal code in 1968. Under § 149, sexual acts with persons of the opposite sex between the ages of 14 and 16 were punishable if the victim's "moral immaturity" was exploited by using "gifts, the promise of benefits or similar" methods of persuasion "to initiate intercourse or actions similar to intercourse".

Male homosexuality had been illegal under § 175 regardless of age since 1872. Female homosexuality was not prosecuted. In West Germany, male homosexuality was legalised in 1969. The age of consent was set to 21 years and reduced to 18 years in 1973. Only men of 18 or older could be offenders, and courts could refrain from punishment if the offender was not yet 21. In East Germany, the criminal code was supplemented in 1957 by a provision that allowed the waiving of prosecution if no harm had been done to socialist society by the unlawful act. Concerning § 175, this meant that male homosexual acts were prosecuted only if they involved minors, which meant persons under 18. The new criminal code of 1968 officially legalised homosexuality and in § 151, which now was gender-neutral, criminalised only homosexual acts of adults with minors. In 1987 the GDR supreme court ruled that homosexuality was a variant of sexual behaviour, on a par with heterosexuality. In 1989 § 151 was repealed and § 149 amended to include any sexual orientation.

After German reunification, according to the Unification Treaty of 1990, the § 149 code section stayed in force for the territory of the former GDR, and in West Germany, § 175 and § 182 were no longer enforced. West German lawmakers also saw the need for gender- and sexual-orientation-neutrality, and for rebalancing sexual self-determination with the protection of minors. In the ensuing 1994 reform, the minimum age of 14 for all of Germany was kept, and in building on legal traditions of both states, sexual acts committed by a person above 21 with a minor under 16 involving exploitation of the minor's individual lack of capacity for sexual self-determination were made punishable in a new § 182. § 175 was abolished. In general, the need for a complaint from the former West German law was kept, but in the case of special public interest, the offence was made prosecutable ex officio, as had been the case in East German law.

== Greece ==
The age of consent in Greece is 15.

The general provision for age of consent in Greece is 15 as specified by Article 339, as well as Articles 337, 348B of the Greek Penal Code. In 2015, along with the legalisation of same-sex civil unions, Article 347 which provided a further prohibition of seducing a male under 17 if the actor is a male adult was repealed, therefore equalising age of consent for homosexual acts.

There are also several other prohibitions regarding positions of authority and sexual acts, as specified by Articles 342 and 343. Furthermore, there is a close-in-age exemption of 3 years age difference for sexual acts between persons younger than 15.

== Hungary ==
The age of consent in Hungary is 14. A close-in-age exemption allows sexual acts from age 12 if the older party is under 18.

The new criminal code in force since 1 July 2013 reads: "The person who has completed their eighteenth year who has sexual intercourse with a person who has not yet completed their fourteenth year, commits a felony and shall be punishable with imprisonment from one year to five years". "The person who has sexual intercourse with a person who has not yet completed their twelfth year, commits a felony and shall be punishable with imprisonment from five years to ten years".

=== History ===
Until 1961, homosexual acts were illegal. After decriminalisation, the age of consent for homosexual acts was 20 and remained so until 1978. From then, until 1999, the age of consent for such acts was 18, as specified by Section 199. In 2002, the Hungarian Constitutional Court repealed Section 199, and the age of consent for homosexual acts was lowered to 14 in line with heterosexual acts.

== Iceland ==
The age of consent in Iceland is 15, as specified by Section 202 of the Icelandic Penal Code, which reads: "Any person who has sexual intercourse or other sexual relations with a child under the age of 15 years shall be imprisoned for a minimum of 1 year and a maximum of 16 years. The age of consent was raised from 14 to 15 in 2007. The law states that "Punishment may be reduced or waived if the perpetrator and the victim are of similar age or level of maturity".

== Ireland ==
The age of consent in the Republic of Ireland is 17, in relation to vaginal or anal sex, and vaginal or anal penetration. This is the highest age of consent in the European Union, shared by Southern Cyprus.

Relevant offences are found in the Criminal Law (Sexual Offences) Act 2017, which amended the Criminal Law (Sexual Offences) Act 2006. Sentences are longer for offences on children under 15, for repeat offences and where the offender is an authority-figure such as a close relative or teacher. In the case of offences with children aged 15 and 16, the relevant statute, Sexual act with child under 17 years of age, provides that "8) Where, in proceedings for an offence under this section against a child who at the time of the alleged commission of the offence had attained the age of 15 years but was under the age of 17 years, it shall be a defence that the child consented to the sexual act of which the offence consisted where the defendant—(a) is younger or less than 2 years older than the child, (b) was not, at the time of the alleged commission of the offence, a person in authority in respect of the child, and (c) was not, at the time of the alleged commission of the offence, in a relationship with the child that was intimidatory or exploitative of the child."

=== History ===
Before the 1922 independence of the Irish Free State, the law in Ireland was that of the United Kingdom of Great Britain and Ireland (see the UK history section). Anal sex was illegal under the Offences against the Person Act 1861, while the Criminal Law Amendment Act 1885 criminalised "Defilement of girl between thirteen and sixteen years of age", with more severe penalties for "Defilement of girl under thirteen years of age". The 1930 Carrigan Report into child sex abuse and underage prostitution recommended raising the age of consent to 18 years. The Criminal Law Amendment Act 1935 raised the age to 17, with more severe penalties under age 15, and disallowed a defence of mistake. The law on child sex abuse, including the age of consent, was the subject of a 1989 consultation paper and 1990 report by the Law Reform Commission (LRC). The Criminal Law (Sexual Offences) Act 1993 decriminalised male homosexual acts and created offences of "Buggery of persons under 17 years of age" and "Gross indecency with males under 17 years of age". In 2006, the 1935 law was struck out when the Supreme Court found that its prohibition of the mistake defence violated a defendant's Constitutional rights.

The Criminal Law (Sexual Offences) Act 2006, quickly passed within the scope of the Supreme Court's judgement, replaced the 1935 and 1993 offences with the current ones. The exemption for girls under 17 was recommended by the LRC and the Director of Public Prosecutions who felt "it would be wrong to stigmatise mothers and pregnant girls of 15 or 16 years of age as if they were either the victims of violent rape or they had committed a crime". While this was controversial, the Minister pointed out that the previous law had not criminalised any sex act by a girl under 17. The 2006 report of the Oireachtas Joint Committee on Child Protection recommended changing the age of consent to 16, and 18 with a person in authority. It advised that close-in-age cases should remain criminalised, but with more lenient guidelines for sentencing. It also recommended wider publicity of the age limits. Most of the changes were implemented in 2017, although the age of consent remained 17.

== Italy ==
The age of consent in Italy is 14 years, with a close-in-age exception that allows those aged 13 to engage in sexual activity with partners who are less than 4 years older than them.

The age of consent rises to 16 if one of the participants has some kind of influence on the other (e.g. parent, whether a natural or an adoptive one, teacher, tutor, etc.).

If the minor involved is under the age of 10, the crime can be punished even without a complaint and the punishment is aggravated; the sentence is doubled, ranging from a minimum of 12 to a maximum of 24 years of imprisonment. It is also illegal to perform sexual acts in the presence of a minor aged less than 14 with the intent of allowing the minor to witness the acts, even if they do not take an active part.

Article 609 bis (Sexual Violence) reads: "Whoever, by violence or threats, or through abuse of authority, forces someone to perform or submit to sexual acts is punishable by five to ten years of imprisonment. The same penalty applies to anyone who induces someone to perform or submit to sexual acts: 1) by abusing the injured party's physical or mental inferiority at the time of the act; 2) by deceiving the injured party by impersonating another person. In less serious cases, the penalty is reduced by no more than two-thirds." The ruling No. 22520 of 8 June 2007 by the Fourth Criminal Section of the Supreme Court of Cassation established that breast fondling, while constituting the crime of sexual assault (Article 609-bis of the Criminal Code), can fall under the mitigating circumstances of "less seriousness" if the act is rapid, not preceded by threats, and is of limited duration. The assessment requires a comprehensive analysis of the conduct.

Not knowing that the victim is underage is not a legal defence, except when it was unavoidable ignorance. As established by the ruling No. 30915 of the Third Criminal Section of the Supreme Court of Cassation on 16 September 2025, "the typical excusing factor provided for by Article 602-quarter of the Criminal Code, in relation to unavoidable ignorance regarding the age of the victim, can only be established if the offender, despite having diligently carried out the necessary investigations, was led to believe, based on unequivocal evidence, that the minor was an adult. Consequently, elements such as the presence in the subject of physical developmental traits typical of adults or verbal reassurances regarding the victim's age, whether from the minor or from third parties, are not sufficient to establish the grounds for non-punishment, even if they exist simultaneously." This was in line with past rulings, such as that of 28 October 2021 by the Third Criminal Section, which ruled that "the individual's ignorance of the victim's age excuses his or her conduct only if, despite having diligently carried out the necessary investigations, he or she is led to believe, on the basis of unequivocal evidence, that the minor is an adult; it follows that verbal reassurances alone, provided by the minor or by third parties, regarding the minor's age, are not sufficient, especially if provided in an ambiguous manner."

== Kosovo ==
The age of consent in Kosovo is 16. Article 228 of the Penal Penalty Code states: "Term 'Consent' means the voluntary agreement of a person who has reached the age of sixteen years to engage in the sexual act in question", and Article 230 states that, "1. Whoever subjects another person to a sexual act without such person's consent shall be punished by imprisonment of two (2) to ten (10) years."

== Latvia ==
The age of consent in Latvia is 16.

The main legislation is specified by the Latvian Criminal Law, Section 161 (Acts of a sexual nature with a Person who has not Attained the Age of Sixteen Years), which translated reads: "Committing a sexual, anal or oral act or another unnatural sexual act of gratification, or other acts of a sexual nature committed in physical contact with the victim's body, if it was done with a person who has not attained the age of sixteen years and if such offence has been committed by a person who has attained the age of majority, is punished by deprivation of liberty for a term of up to five years, or short-term imprisonment, or community service, or a fine and probationary supervision for a period of up to five years."

Sections 159 and 160 provide harsher penalties for rape and forcible sexual assault of juveniles.

=== History ===
Until 1992, male homosexual acts were illegal under Section 124.1 of the Latvian Criminal Code. This provision was repealed by the Latvian Parliament in 1992 and an unequal age of consent for male homosexual acts was set at 18. In 1998, the Latvian Parliament adopted a new Criminal Code which took effect in 1999, and equalised the age of consent at 16 for all sexual acts.

== Liechtenstein ==
The age of consent in Liechtenstein is 14, according to the Liechtenstein Criminal Code. There is also a close-in-age exception, lowering the age of consent to 12 if the other party is not more than 3 years older and some additional conditions are met. Sexual activity with 14- to 15-year-olds is generally legal, but it can still be punished if sexual access to these children has been obtained by exploiting their lack of sexual self-determination.

== Lithuania ==
The age of consent in Lithuania is 16, as specified by the Lithuanian Criminal Code 151.1, introduced by the bill of 2 July 2010.

=== Close-in-age exemption ===
Lithuania has a close-in-age exemption if there's no "big difference in age, mental and physical maturity between the participants of the actions", according to §151.1(5) of the Lithuanian Criminal Code. It is not specified what the court would consider a "big age difference". In a 2015 case where sexual activity between an 18-year-old male and a 14-year-old female resulted in a pregnancy, they did not consider an age gap of "a little over 4-years" as "big":

Such a difference is not considered big. When evaluating the characterizing material, the court concluded that the mental and physical maturity of the participants in the actions is of a similar level. The circumstances that they have been friends as a boyfriend and girlfriend for about a year, love each other, after this relationship the minor has become pregnant and is preparing to give birth to a child, plans to enter into marriage.
Toks skirtumas nelaikytinas dideliu. Vertinant charakterizuojančią medžiagą teismas padarė išvadą, kad veiksmų dalyvių dvasinė ir fizinė branda yra panašaus lygio. Tos aplinkybės, kad apie metus laiko jie draugauja kaip vaikinas ir mergina, myli vienas kitą, po šių santykių nepilnametė yra tapusi nėščia ir ruošiasi vaiką gimdyti, planuoja sudaryti santuoką.

In a Lithuanian Supreme Court case from 18 May 2023, which was about a 20-year-old male participating in sexual activity with a 14-year-old female, the court acquitted the male and his rape charges were dropped. The court noted:

A person under the age of 16 can be equated to a 16-year-old in terms of physical maturity, and conversely, an adult can be equated to a younger person in terms of physical maturity.
Tai reiškia, kad jaunesnis nei 16 metų asmuo pagal fizinę brandą gali būti prilyginamas sulaukusiam 16 metų, ir priešingai – pilnametis asmuo pagal fizinės brandos požymius gali prilygti jaunesniam.

The Supreme Court stated that for the decision, they consider, beside the mathematical age difference, also:

signs of physical maturity, nature of sexual behaviour, previous experience, visual appearance (whether the perpetrator and the victim, viewed from the side, can be classified as people of a similar age), etc.
fizinės brandos požymius, lytinio elgesio pobūdį, ankstesnę patirtį, vizualinį asmenų atitikimą (ar kaltininkas ir nukentėjusysis, žvelgiant iš šono, gali būti priskiriami panašaus amžiaus žmonių kategorijai) ir kt.

=== History ===
Until 1993, male homosexual acts were prohibited under the Lithuanian Criminal Code, Article 1221, which was repealed in that year. The new law set an age of consent of 17 for male oral and anal intercourse, 16 for other male homosexual acts, and 14 for lesbian and heterosexual acts. In 2004, the law was amended to equalise the age of consent at 14 for all sexual acts; the age of consent was raised to 16 in 2010, regardless of gender and sexual orientation.

Before the bill, which was introduced 2 July 2010 the age of consent was set to 14 according to the Lithuanian Criminal Code §153 prohibiting any sexual molestation or sexual relationships with a minor under 14 years. The age of consent (14) was not set directly in this article of the Lithuanian criminal code, though; it has been established by Lithuanian case law. This meant that both heterosexual and homosexual acts were allowed once a child had reached the age of 14. There was (and remains) an exception to this rule: §151.1(3) of the Lithuanian Criminal Code prohibits parents, guardians, or other people who are ex officio directly responsible for the upbringing and supervision of a child to have any relationships of sexual kind with the child, if he or she has not yet reached the age of 18.

== Luxembourg ==
The age of consent in Luxembourg is 16. According to the 2023 legal framework, the offense of rape of a minor occurs when any act of sexual penetration is committed on a minor under the age of 16, except where the close-in-age exemption for minors at least 13 years of age where there is a difference of less than 4 years between the partners exists.

== Malta ==
The age of consent in Malta is 16. Sexual activity – typically by people over 16 – with people between 12 and 15 can be considered defilement of minors by lewd acts or corruption of a minor, which, at the discretion of prosecutors and the courts, depending on the circumstances, may result in a conviction.

Art. 201 of Chapter 9 of the Laws of Malta (Presumption of violence in cases of carnal knowledge and indecent assault) states:

201. Unlawful carnal knowledge and any other indecent assault, shall be presumed to be accompanied with violence -
(a) when it is committed on any person under twelve years of age;
(b) when the person abused was unable to offer resistance owing to physical or mental infirmity, or for any other cause independent of the act of the offender, or in consequence of any fraudulent device used by the offender.

The punishment is imprisonment from three to nine years, with or without solitary confinement, as described in Art. 198 (Rape or carnal knowledge with violence). The punishment can be increased in certain cases described in Art. 202, such as when the person has not attained the age of nine years.

Art. 204 of Chapter 9 of the Laws of Malta (Defilement of minors) reads:

203. (1) Whosoever, by lewd acts, defiles a minor of either sex, shall, on conviction, be liable to imprisonment for a term not exceeding three years, with or without solitary confinement: ...

A number of aggravating circumstances exist to this blanket provision including: Abuse of parental authority or tutorship, where the victim is under the age of 12 and if the offence is committed by means of threats or deceit. There is no definition of how old the offender must be: Even another minor can be guilty of this crime, although there is no evidence that any such case has ever been prosecuted.

The age of majority is defined in Art 188 of Chapter 16 of the Civil Laws of Malta:

188. (1) Majority is fixed at the completion of the eighteenth year of age.

To apply Art. 203, there are requirements:

For the completed offence and apart from the formal element of the offence, there must be the lewd act (atto di libidine) and the actual defilement. The lewd act may be committed either on the person or in the presence of the minor. All acts which, either by their very nature or of the circumstances in which they are performed, either are directed to the indulgence of the sexual appetite, either of the agent or of the victim, and are capable of arousing sexual interest of the victim, are lewd acts for the purposes of the offence in question.

The interpretation of the law is situational and at the discretion of the prosecution and the courts, based on relevant factors that may be taken into account to decide whether the minor was actually "defiled". For example, in 2008 two brothers, aged 19 and 20, were found not guilty of defiling a girl, then aged 16 (until 2018 the age of consent was 18). Their sexual encounters were consensual, and it was clear that the girl had had several previous sexual adventures with several youths. In 2007 a man of 30 was found guilty of defiling a boy, then aged 14. He had set up a situation in which the boy came to his apartment; as a result of both childish curiosity and what the court deemed to be the guile of the adult man, the boy remained in the apartment even while man first showered and then committed the lewd acts. There are also other cases, where offenders have been found guilty even though the circumstances were not clear, such as the case of a hotel manager aged 35 with a 14-year-old girl on holiday, three men aged 18, 19 and 20 with three 14-year-old girls, or another hotel manager of 46 and a boy of 14, who had encounters over a longer time.

In the wording of the law there is no discrimination on the basis of sexual orientation; however, discrimination can result from selective enforcement with regard to individual cases. "This may therefore lead to a higher incidence of cases in which the minor and the perpetrator are of the same sex, given that there may be parents who would not resort to legal proceedings should their 17-year-old child have sexual relations with another person of the opposite sex but would do so if the person is of the same sex."

Marriage is allowed as early as the age of 16, which until May 2018 theoretically would have allowed a case to arise in which a spouse press charges under this article. In practice, this problem has never arisen.

The concept of age-banding employed in for example Canada is not present in the Maltese legal system and sexual activity between one partner who is 15 years old and another who is 16 years old can constitute defilement of minors, depending on the circumstances, with no exception being allowed purely on the basis of the proximity of their ages.

In early 2018 Parliament voted in favour of the "Gender-Based Violence and Domestic Violence Act, 2018" which came into effect on 14 May 2018. The primary objective of the Act is to transpose the Council of Europe Convention on prevention and combating of violence against women and domestic violence, and it also includes amendments that lowered the age of consent to 16.

== Moldova ==
The age of consent in Moldova is 16, per the Criminal Code of the Republic of Moldova.

(1) Sexual intercourse other than rape as well as any other acts of vaginal or anal penetration committed with a person certainly known to be under the age of 16 shall be punished by imprisonment for up to 5 years.
(2) The person who committed the act set forth in par. (1) shall not be subject to criminal liability if he/she is similar to the victim in terms of age and physical and mental development.

— Criminal Code of the Republic of Moldova, Article 174

The commission of perverted actions against a person certainly known to be under the age of 16 shall be punished by imprisonment for up to 5 years.

— Criminal Code of the Republic of Moldova, Article 175

Articles 171 and 172 provide harsher penalties for Rape and Violent Sexual Actions (including physical or mental coercion) against juveniles.

== Monaco ==
The age of consent in Monaco is 15.

== Montenegro ==
The age of consent in Montenegro is 14, as set out in Article 206 of the Criminal Code. Article 207 makes it illegal "for a teacher, instructor, guardian, adoptive parent, stepfather, stepmother or other person with a similar position to abuse one's position or authority in order to perform sexual intercourse or an equal act with a minor (under 18) entrusted for teaching, education, custody and care. who arranges a sexual relationship, an equivalent act, or any other sexual act with a minor will be punished with a prison sentence of six months to five years." Article 216 prohibits "Extramarital community with a minor".

Article 216 reads: "(1) An adult person who lives in an extramarital community with a minor, shall be punished by an imprisonment sentence of three months to three years. (2) A parent, adoptive parent or a guardian who enables a minor to live in an extramarital community with another person or incites him/her into it shall be punished by a penalty referred to in Paragraph 1 of this Article."

=== History ===
Montenegro decriminalised homosexual sex in 1977, with an equal age of consent, set at 14.

== Netherlands ==
The age of consent in the Netherlands is 16, as specified by the Dutch Criminal Code:

A person who, out of wedlock, with a person who has reached the age of twelve but has not reached sixteen, performs indecent acts comprising or including sexual penetration of the body is liable to a term of imprisonment of not more than eight years or a fine of the fifth category.

— Dutch Criminal Code, Art 245

A person who, with a person whom he knows to be unconscious or physically unable to resist or to be suffering from such a degree of mental defect or mental disease that he is incapable or not sufficiently capable of exercising or expressing his will in the matter or of offering resistance, performs indecent acts, or who, with a person who has not yet reached the age of sixteen (16) years, out of wedlock, performs indecent acts, or by whom the latter is enticed into performing, or submitting to such acts, out of wedlock, with a third party, is liable to a term of imprisonment of not more than six years or a fine of the fourth category.

— Dutch Criminal Code, Art 247

Close-in-age exceptions (for consensual acts between adolescents close in age, within "social-ethical norms") are at the discretion of the prosecution. Acts such as a ménage-a-trois, or an unequal relationship, e.g. the perpetrator (17) was not in love, while the victim (15) was, can also be considered outside "social-ethical norms".

The overseas territories of the Netherlands in Curaçao and Sint Maarten have their own local age of consent laws, where the age of consent in both territories is 15.

=== History ===
In the 1990s, the Netherlands gained international attention due to its policies regarding the age of consent. Between 1990 and 2002 the Netherlands operated what was in effect an age of consent of 12, subject to qualifications. The relevant law, passed in November 1990, permitted sexual intercourse for young people between 12 and 16 in most circumstances, but allowed a challenge by parents or by the Child Protection Agency if there was evidence of exploitation. Although the age of consent was often reported internationally to be 12, this was partly misleading, because sexual acts up to 16 remained open to prosecution. The Netherlands has gained an international reputation of being extremely liberal on sexual issues, with some of this due to exaggerated reports in foreign media and claims by foreign politicians, rather than based on reality. For instance, during the 1980s, some conservative campaigners in the US claimed that children were sold into sexual slavery at "auctions" held in Amsterdam, but did not produce any evidence to support their claims.

== North Macedonia ==
The age of consent in North Macedonia is 14, and it is illegal for an adult to be in an "unwed partnership" with a minor. Sexual acts with a minor is also illegal if there is an abuse of trust or authority.

Article 188(1) of the Criminal Code of North Macedonia (amended 2018) prohibits sexual conduct with a child under 14:

Whosoever commits statutory rape or some other sexual act upon a child who has not turned 14 years of age, shall be sentenced to imprisonment of minimum 12 years.

— Criminal Code of North Macedonia, Art 188

Article 197 prohibits an adult living in an extra-marital community with a juvenile under 18:

(1) An adult who lives in an unwed partnership with a child who has reached the age of 14, but not the age of 18, shall be sentenced to imprisonment of three months to three years. … (4) If the crime referred to in paragraphs (1) and (2) is committed with a minor who has reached the age of 16, but not the age of 18, the prosecution shall be initiated upon a proposal.

— Criminal Code of North Macedonia, Art 197

Article 189(2) prohibits sexual acts with a Juvenile under 18 when there is an abuse of trust or authority:

(1) Whosoever by abusing his position induces another, who is subordinated or dependent, to sexual intercourse or some other sexual act, or with the same intention abuses, intimidates or acts in a way that humiliates the human dignity and the human personality against another, shall be sentenced to imprisonment of minimum five years. (2) If the crime referred to in paragraph (1) of this Article is committed by a blood relative in direct line or a brother, i.e. sister, teacher, tutor, adoptive parent, guardian, stepfather, stepmother, doctor or another person by abusing their position or by committing family violence commits a statutory rape or other sexual act with a child who has turned 14 years of age and who is entrusted to him/her for education, tutoring, care, shall be sentenced to imprisonment of at least ten years.

— Criminal Code of North Macedonia, Art 189

Previously Article 71 defined "Child" as a person under 14, while article 72 defined "Juvenile" as a person under 18. These articles were deleted in the amended code.

== Northern Cyprus ==
Northern Cyprus has an age of consent of 16 as designated in the Penal Code (Ceza Yasası, Art. 153 & 154).

=== History ===
Prior to 2014, sodomy was illegal, the age of consent only applied to females and sexual contact with a female between the ages of 13 and 16 was a misdemeanor. As of 2014, the age of consent is set at 16 for both males and females, sexual contact with any child under 16 regardless of gender is a felony and the ban on sodomy is lifted, thereby legalising homosexual sex.

== Norway ==
The age of consent in Norway is 16, as specified by the 2005 Penal Code §304: which reads: "Any person who performs a sexual act with a child under 16 years of age shall be subject to imprisonment for a term not exceeding three years, unless the conduct falls within the scope of section 299." Aggravating circumstances as recidivism, multiple perpetrators, and unusual degree of degradation and pain, or physical harm (including, specifically, sexually transmitted diseases) may raise the maximum penalty.

The penal code on the age of consent is three-tiered.

If the child is under 14 years, §299 of the same penal code, reads: "A penalty of imprisonment for a term not exceeding 10 years shall be applied to any person who: a) engages in sexual activity with a child under 14 years of age, b) makes a child under 14 years of age perform acts corresponding to sexual activity on himself/herself, or c) performs an aggravated sexual act with a child under 14 years of age." §300 and §301 of the same penal code, sets minimum penalty, of any person who engages in sexual acts with children under 14 years, to 3-year of imprisonment, and up to 21 years.

If the child is between 14 and 16 years, § 302, reads: "Any person who engages in sexual activity with a child between 14 and 16 years of age shall be subject to imprisonment for a term not exceeding six years, unless the conduct also falls within the scope of other provisions. The same penalty shall be applied to any person who makes a child between 14 and 16 years of age perform acts corresponding to sexual activity on himself/herself."

According to Chapter 1, § 5, of the penal code, §299-306 applies also if the act was committed outside Norway and by a non-Norwegian citizen or resident.

Even though one may be found guilty of violating the age of consent code, if those involved are "about equal as regards age and development", the court can exercise its own discretion to suspend passing a sentence.

=== History ===
Sexual relations between two women was never explicitly criminalised, but have been prosecuted under the general indecency law of the Civil Penal Code of 1842. In 1951, a Norwegian ministry of justice white paper recommended de-criminalization of homosexual acts in the 1903 Civil Penal Code §213, but this was rejected by the Norwegian Parliament (Stortinget). The ban on sex between men, which also outlawed cohabitation, as well as sex with animals, was repealed in 1972; bestiality was recriminalised in 2008. The Penal Code of 2005, replaced the 1902 General Civil Penal Code, and was entered into force on 1 October 2015.

=== Svalbard ===
According to the Svalbard Treaty, Norwegian law is applied as the minimum standard. The age of consent is therefore 16.

== Poland ==
The age of consent in Poland is 15, as specified by the Polish Penal Code (Kodeks karny), Article 200, which reads:

Article 200 § 1. Whoever subjects a minor under 15 years of age to sexual intercourse or makes him/her submit to another sexual act or to perform such an act shall be subject to the penalty of the deprivation of liberty for a term of between 2 and 15 years.

Article 198 KK ("Sexual use of insanity or helplessness") states:

"Whoever, taking advantage of the vulnerability of another person, or of the lack of ability to recognise the significance of the act or ability to control his/her conduct, resulting from mental disability or disorder, subjects such a person to sexual intercourse or makes him/her submit to another sexual act or to perform such an act ..."

Is punishable by imprisonment from 6 months to 8 years.

=== History ===
In 1932, the new Polish Penal Code after regaining independence was introduced, setting the age of consent at 15 years for all sexual acts, regardless of gender.

== Portugal ==
The age of consent in Portugal is 14, with some exceptions. An adult is not allowed to have a sexual relationship with an adolescent aged 14 to 16 if their inexperience is taken advantage of, or aged 16 to 18 if the adult is entrusted with their education or assistance. The laws apply regardless of gender or sexual orientation. The age of consent and exceptions are defined by Article 171, 172 and 173 of Section II – Crimes against sexual self-determination of the Penal Code.

Articles

Article 171 – Child sexual abuse

1. Anyone who engages in a major sexual act with or under 14 years of age, or causes him to do it with another person, is punished with imprisonment from one to eight years.
2. If the sexual act of relief consists of copulation, anal intercourse, oral intercourse or vaginal or anal introduction of body parts or objects, the agent is punished with imprisonment of three to ten years.
3. Who:
  1. To prevent minors under 14 years of age, practising the act provided for in article 170; or
  2. Act on a child under the age of 14, by means of a conversation, writing, spectacle or pornographic object;
  3. Enticing children under 14 to attend sexual abuse or sexual activity;
  is punished with imprisonment for up to three years.
4. Whoever commits the acts described in the preceding paragraph for profit is punished with imprisonment from six months to five years.
5. The attempt is punishable.

Article 172 – Sexual abuse of dependent children

1. Those who practice or lead to practice the act described in paragraphs 1 or 2 of the previous article, relative to a minor between 14 and 18 years of age entrusted to him or her for education or assistance, shall be punished with imprisonment from one to eight years.
2. Whoever commits an act described in paragraph 3 of the previous article, in relation to the minor understood in the previous paragraph of this article and under the conditions described therein, shall be punished with imprisonment of up to one year.
3. Whoever commits the acts described in the preceding paragraph for profit is punished with imprisonment for up to 5 years.
4. The attempt is punishable.

Article 173 – Sexual acts with adolescents

1. Who, being of legal age, engages in a major sexual act between the ages of 14 and 16, or causes it to be practised by him with others, abusing his inexperience, is punished with imprisonment for up to 2 years.
2. If the sexual act of relief consists of copulation, oral intercourse, anal intercourse or vaginal or anal introduction of body parts or objects, the agent is punished with imprisonment for up to 3 years.
3. The attempt is punishable.

=== History ===
Since September 2007, the age of consent was formally equalised as part of the Penal Code of September 2007. Although the age of consent is stipulated at 14 in Portugal, the legality of sexual acts with a minor between 14 and 16 is open to legal interpretation since the law states that it is illegal to perform a sexual act with an adolescent between 14 and 16 years old "by taking advantage of their inexperience".

Homosexual acts were legalised for the first time in Portugal in 1852, with an equal age of consent at that time - although homosexuality was again re-criminalised in 1886. They were decriminalised a second time in 1983 and an age of consent was set at 16, in line with heterosexual activities. In 1995, a new Penal Code was introduced with "different circumstances" for different sexual behaviours. Since September 2007, the age of consent, regardless of sexual behaviour, gender or sexual orientation, is 14.

== Romania ==
The age of consent in Romania is currently set at 16, according to legal changes to the Criminal Code in 2020.

According to Article 220 of the Penal Code: "Sexual intercourse, oral or anal intercourse, as well as any other acts of vaginal or anal penetration committed with a minor aged between 14 and 16 shall be punished by imprisonment from one to 5 years." (Raportul sexual, actul sexual oral sau anal, precum și orice alte acte de penetrare vaginală sau anală comise cu un minor cu vârsta între 14 și 16 ani se pedepsesc cu închisoarea de la unu la 5 ani.) If aggravated circumstances exist, the punishment increases to up to 10 years. If the age difference between partners is not more than five years, the acts are not punished (paragraph 6, art 220).

However, sexual acts that do not include penetration may be performed from age 14. The law sets several other restrictions in regard to children under 14: it is illegal for an adult to perform sexual acts in view of such a child; to show pornographic materials to such a child or to induce the child to view sex shows; or to solicit such a child to meet for sexual acts (such as on-line solicitation). (articles 221 and 222 of the Penal Code).

In addition, it is illegal for an adult to engage in sexual acts with an adolescent under 18, if the adult abuses the authority or influence they have over the minor in order to gain the sexual access.

The relevant articles of the Criminal Code are Art. 220, Art. 221 and Art. 222. All these laws are gender neutral and apply regardless of the sexual orientation of those involved.

=== History ===
For a very long time, the age of consent in Romania was 14. The Penal Code of 1864, which followed shortly after the unity of Principalities of Moldavia and Wallachia forming the state of Romania, and was in force between 1865 and 1936, set an age of consent of 14. Under this code, Article 263 read: "Any assault against decency, whether completed or attempted, without violence, upon the person of a child, either male or female, aged less than 14 years, shall be punished with imprisonment between two and three years." Article 264 defined "assault against decency with violence", the equivalent of the modern-day crime of rape (although the term "rape" was not used in that code), and stipulated that the maximum penalty should be given if the victim was under 15 years of age. In 1936, a new criminal code came into force. Article 421 read: "The man who has sexual intercourse with a girl under 14 years of age commits the offense of assault against decency without violence, and is punishable by imprisonment between one and three years." However, if aggravated factors existed (such as pregnancy, a sexually transmitted disease, or committed by a person with a specific relation to the victim, or by several persons) the punishment was increased. With regard to rape (article 419) the victim being under 14 constituted an aggravating factor. After the installation of the communist regime, the code was modified several time, and, in 1969, a new penal code came into effect. Nevertheless, the age of consent of 14 was maintained. Article 198 of the 1969 code read: "Sexual intercourse with a female person who has not attained the age of 14 is punishable by imprisonment of one to five years." In a case of rape, similarly with the previous code, the victim being under 14 constituted an aggravating factor (Article 197).

The late 1990s and the early 21st century saw major modifications to the criminal code, in an effort to modify what was seen as outdated provisions, especially as Romania prepared to enter the EU. As such, homosexuality was decriminalised, the text of several criminal offences was modified by making it gender-neutral, the age of consent was lifted to 15 (applicable to both girls and boys), punishments for several sexual crimes were increased, and the stipulation that a rapist could avoid punishment after rape if he married his victim was abolished. Changes were made through Law no. 140/1996, Law No. 197/2000, Emergency Ordinance no. 89/2001, and Emergency Ordinance no. 143/2002. Nevertheless, the rapid adoption of numerous laws led to poorly drafted and contradictory texts, which have caused difficulty among the jurisprudence and doctrine, and several cases ended to the High Court of Cassation and Justice in order to clarify the interpretation of the law. Finally, a new criminal code entered into force on 1 February 2014, which set the age of consent at 15.

== Russia ==
The age of consent in Russia is 16. The age of consent changed several times in Russian history: the Criminal Code of RSFSR (Russian Soviet Federal Socialist Republic) stated "sexual maturity" as the age of consent; when the Criminal Code of Russia was adopted in 1996, the age of consent was proclaimed to be the same regardless of sexual orientation and was set to 16 years old; in 1998 it was lowered to 14 years; and in 2003 it was returned again to 16 years, which is the current age of consent in Russia. Law of early 2012 tightened the consent laws in Articles 134 and 135 considerably. However, only a person over 18 can be charged. Charges are relatively low (up to 4 years of prison) – regardless of gender – and "obscene actions" have even less charges. If the victim is not understanding the nature and consequences of the act (due to their age being under 12 or mental abilities), it will be considered rape and charged much more severely (up to 15 years of prison, or up to 20 if the victim is under 14).

=== Article 134 ===
Article 134 is entitled "Sexual Intercourse and Other Actions of Sexual Character with a Person Who Has Not Reached the Age of Sixteen Years".

1. Sexual intercourse committed by a person who has reached the age of eighteen years with a person who has not reached the age of sixteen years – shall be punishable by obligatory labour for a term of up to 480 hours, or by restriction of liberty for a term of up to four years, or by compulsory labour for a term of up to four years with or without deprivation of the right to hold certain posts or to be engaged in a certain activity for a period of up to three years, or by deprivation of liberty for a term of up to four years with or without deprivation of the right to hold certain posts or to be engaged in a certain activity for a period of up to ten years.
2. Pederasty or lesbianism in respect of a person who has not reached sixteen years of age effected by a person who has reached eighteen years of age – shall be punishable by compulsory labour for a term of up to five years with or without deprivation of the right to hold certain posts or to be engaged in a certain activity for a period of up to three years, or by deprivation of liberty for a term of up to six years with or without deprivation of the right to hold certain posts or to be engaged in a certain activity for a period of up to ten years.
3. The deeds stipulated by Parts One and Two of this Article committed to a person who has reached twelve years of age but has not reached fourteen years of age – shall be punishable with deprivation of freedom for a term of three to ten years with or without deprivation of the right to hold certain posts or to be engaged in a certain activity for a period of up to fifteen years and with restriction of liberty for a term of up to two years or without such.
4. The deeds stipulated by Parts One, Two or Three of this Article committed in respect of two or more persons – shall be punishable by deprivation of freedom for a term of eight to fifteen years with or without deprivation of the right to hold certain posts or to be engaged in a certain activity for a period of up to twenty years.
5. The deeds provided for by Parts One, Two, Three or Four of this article made by a group of persons, by a group of persons by previous concert or by an organised group – shall be punishable by deprivation of freedom for a term of twelve to twenty years with or without deprivation of the right to hold certain posts or to be engaged in a certain activity for a period of up to twenty years and with restriction of liberty for a term of up to two years or without such.
6. The deeds provided for by Part Three of this article made by a person with a previous conviction for having committed an offence against sexual integrity of a minor – shall be punishable by deprivation of freedom for a term of fifteen to twenty years with or without deprivation of the right to hold certain posts or to be engaged in a certain activity for a period of up to twenty years or by life imprisonment.

==== Note ====
1. A person who for the first time has committed the crime stipulated by Part One of this Article, shall be relieved of punishment by court if it is established that such person and the action committed by him/her are no longer socially dangerous in connection with his/her entry into marriage with the victim.
2. Where the age difference between the victim and the accused person is less than four years, the latter shall not be punishable by deprivation of liberty for the committed deed provided for by Part One of this article or by Part One of Article 135 of this Code.

=== Article 135 ===
Article 135 is entitled "Depraved Actions".

1. The commission of lecherous actions without using violence by a person who has reached eighteen years of age in respect of a person who has not reached sixteen years of age – shall be punishable by obligatory labour for a term of up to 440 hours, or by restriction of liberty for a term of up to three years, or by compulsory labour for a term of up to five years with or without deprivation of the right to hold certain posts or to be engaged in a certain activity for a period of up to three years, or by deprivation of liberty for a term of up to three years with or without deprivation of the right to hold certain posts or to be engaged in a certain activity for a period of up to ten years.
2. The same deed committed in respect of the person who has reached twelve years of age but has not reached fourteen years of age – shall be punishable with deprivation of freedom for a term of three to eight years with or without deprivation of the right to hold certain posts or to be engaged in a certain activity for a period of up to fifteen years and with restriction of liberty for a term of up to two years or without such.
3. The deeds provided for by Parts One or Two of this article made in respect of two or more persons – shall be punishable by deprivation of liberty for a term of five to twelve years with or without deprivation of the right to hold certain posts or to be engaged in a certain activity for a period of up to twenty years.
4. The acts stipulated by Parts One, Two or Three of this Article committed by a group of persons in preliminary collusion or by an organised group – shall be punishable by deprivation of freedom for a term of seven to fifteen years with or without deprivation of the right to hold certain posts or to be engaged in a certain activity for a period of up to twenty years and with restriction of liberty for a term of up to two years or without such.

==== 2012 amendment ====
Federal Law No. 14-FZ of 29 February 2012 supplemented Article 135 of this Code with part 5:

5. The deed provided for by Part Two of this article which is made by the person who has a previous conviction for having committed an offence against sexual integrity of a minor – shall be punishable by deprivation of liberty for a term of ten to fifteen years with deprivation of the right to hold definite offices or to engage in definite activities for a term of up to twenty years.

=== Former wording ===
Article 134. Illicit Sexual Relations or Other Sexual Actions with a Person Who Has Not Reached 16 Years of Age Illicit sexual relations, pederasty, or lesbianism, committed by a person who has reached 18 years of age with a person who obviously has not reached 16 years of age, shall be punishable by restraint of liberty for a term of up to three years or by deprivation of liberty for a term of up to four years. Federal Law No. 73-FZ of 21 July 2004 amended Article 135 of the present Code Article 135. Depraved Actions Commission of depraved actions without the use of violence by the person who has reached the age of 18 years in relations to a person who obviously has not reached 16 years of age, shall be punishable by a fine in the amount up to 300 thousand roubles, or in the amount of the wage or salary, or any other income of the convicted person for a period up to two years, or by restraint of liberty for a term of up to two years, or by deprivation of liberty for a term of up to three years.

==== Wording prior to 2004 ====
Article 134 (Illicit Sexual Relations or Other Sexual Actions with a Person Who Has Not Attained 14 Years of Age) reads: "Illicit sexual relations, pederasty, or lesbianism, committed by a person who has attained 18 years of age with a person who obviously has not attained 14 years of age, shall be punishable by restraint of liberty for a term of up to three years or by deprivation of liberty for a term of up to four years." Article 135 (Depraved Actions) reads: "Commission of depraved actions without the use of violence, in relations to a person who obviously has not attained 14 years of age, shall be punishable by a fine in the amount of 300 to 500 minimum wages, or in the amount of the wage or salary, or any other income of the convicted person for a period of three to five months, or by restraint of liberty for a term of up to two years, or by deprivation of liberty for a term of up to three years."

=== Further reading ===
- Criminal Code of the Russian Federation (in Russian)
- Criminal Code of the Russian Federation — Chapter 18 (in Russian)
- LGBT rights in Russia

=== History ===
The penalty for having sex with a minor is not always applied. For example, in 2005, Valentina Isaeva gave birth to a girl in Moscow, Russia at the age of 11 years, 10 months. The father was 19-year-old Habibula Patahonov from Tajikistan, who rented a room in a flat where Valentina was living with her grandmother. The child's father was sentenced conditionally for child abuse but was not jailed because he was willing to support Valentina and their daughter.

== San Marino ==
The age of consent in San Marino is 14, per Article 173. It is also illegal, under Article 177, to "incite a minor under 18 years to sexual corruption".

== Serbia ==
The age of consent in Serbia is 14, regardless of sexual orientation or gender. This is regulated by Chapter 18 (Sexual Offences) of the Penal Code of the Republic of Serbia and especially Article 180 (prohibiting sexual intercourse with a child). Article 112 defines a child as a person under 14 years of age.

Article 181 prohibits sexual intercourse with a juvenile (defined in Article 112 as a person under 18) if the juvenile is entrusted for learning, tutoring, guardianship or care. Article 190 furthermore forbids cohabitation with a minor (person under 18) unless a marriage is conducted. A close-in-age exception for sexual acts with persons under 14 exists, defined as being "no considerable difference between the offender and the child in respect of their mental and physical development".

=== History ===
From 1977 to 1994, sexual acts between men of any age was a criminal offence in Serbia, although the law has never been applied. Then in 1994, an age of consent was set at 18 for anal sex between males; prior to the change males performing anal sexual conduct with another male could be punished by up to 1 year in prison. An age of consent of 16 was set for male homosexual non-anal relationships; this was regulated by section 110 of the Penal Code of the Republic of Serbia, stating that "lewd acts" between a male adult and a male under the age of 16 were punishable by imprisonment from 1 to 8 years. All other sexual acts had an age of consent at 14. Since 2006, an equal age of consent of 14 came into force, regardless of sexual orientation or gender. There was no specific reference to "lewd acts" between two females of the same offence. The current Criminal Code criminalises sex with children, and the given definition of "a child" for all offences is set at 14.

The province of Vojvodina, a northern province of Serbia, had decriminalised homosexuality in 1978, thus effectively making an equal age of consent for any sexual practice regardless of sex or gender. This lasted until Vojvodina lost its law-making power in 1990.

== Slovakia ==
The age of consent in Slovakia is 15, as specified by the Slovak Criminal Code, Section 201.

Any person, who has sexual intercourse with a person less than fifteen years of age or who subjects such person to other sexual abuse, shall be liable to a term of imprisonment of three to ten years.

— § 201 Sexual abuse

=== History ===
The history before 1993 within Czechoslovakia is commons with the Czech Republic. Until 1961, homosexual acts were prohibited, however the Criminal Code of that year decriminalised such behaviour partially. However, under Paragraph 244, the age limit of restriction for homosexual acts was set at 18, besides the general limit 15 years. In 1990, the whole Paragraph 244 was repealed and the age limit became 15 for all.

== Slovenia ==
The age of consent in Slovenia is 15, as specified by the Slovenian Penal Code, Article 173, Section 1, which reads: "(1) Whoever has sexual intercourse or performs any lewd act with a person of the same or opposite sex under the age of fifteen (15) years where there is a marked discrepancy between the maturity of the perpetrator and that of the victim shall be sentenced to imprisonment for not less than six (6) months and not more than five (5) years."

=== History ===
Until 1959, male homosexual acts were prohibited, as was the case in all of former Yugoslavia. A new Penal Code was introduced in 1977, which decriminalised homosexual acts and all discriminatory provisions were removed and age of consent has been set at 14 for all sexual acts since decriminalisation. In 1999, the code was amended to raise the age of consent to 15 years and added the condition for "a marked discrepancy between the maturity of the perpetrator and that of the victim'".

== Spain ==
The age of consent in Spain is 16, under a new law which came into effect on 1 July 2015.

(1) Whoever performs sexual acts with a minor under sixteen years, shall be punished for sexual abuse of a minor with imprisonment of two to six years. ...
(3) When the attack consists of penile entry vaginally, anally or orally, or introduction of body parts or objects in the first two ways, the offender shall be punished with imprisonment from eight to twelve years, in the case of paragraph 1 ...
(1) El que realizare actos de carácter sexual con un menor de dieciséis años, será castigado como responsable de abuso sexual a un menor con la pena de prisión de dos a seis años. ...
(3) Cuando el ataque consista en acceso carnal por vía vaginal, anal o bucal, o introducción de miembros corporales u objetos por alguna de las dos primeras vías, el responsable será castigado con la pena de prisión de ocho a doce años, en el caso del apartado 1 ...

— Spanish Criminal Code, Article 183

There is also a close-of-age exception:

The free consent of the minor under sixteen excludes criminal responsibility for crimes under this chapter, if the perpetrator is a person close in age and level of development or maturity.
El consentimiento libre del menor de dieciséis años excluirá la responsabilidad penal por los delitos previstos en este Capítulo, cuando el autor sea una persona próxima al menor por edad y grado de desarrollo o madurez.

The age of consent rises to 18 if there is deception or abuse of a recognised position of trust, authority or influence over the minor.

(1) Whoever performs sexual acts with a person over sixteen and under eighteen by deception or abuse of a recognised position of trust, authority or influence, shall be punished with imprisonment of one to three years.
(1) El que, interviniendo engaño o abusando de una posición reconocida de confianza, autoridad o influencia sobre la víctima, realice actos de carácter sexual con persona mayor de dieciséis años y menor de dieciocho, será castigado con la pena de prisión de uno a tres años.

— Spanish Criminal Code, Article 182

=== History ===
Historically, the age of consent was usually twelve in the Christian kingdoms of Iberia. A new Penal Code was introduced in Spain in 1995 which specified an age of consent of 12 for all sexual acts, but this was raised to 13 in 1999 and to 16 in 2015.

Same-sex sexual acts were lawful in Spain from 1822 to 1954, with the exception of the offence of "unusual or outrageous indecent acts with same-sex persons" between 1928 and 1932. However, some homosexuals were arrested in the days of the Second Spanish Republic under the "Ley de Vagos y Maleantes" (Vagrants and Common Delinquents Law). Homosexual acts were made unlawful during Francisco Franco's time in power, first by an amendment to the "Ley de Vagos y Maleantes" in 1954, and later by the "Ley de Peligrosidad y Rehabilitación Social " (Law on Danger and Social Rehabilitation) in 1970. In 1979 Adolfo Suarez's government reversed the prohibition of homosexual acts in that law.

== Sweden ==
The age of consent in Sweden is 15, as specified by the Swedish Penal Code. The age of consent is raised to 18 if one person is in a position of trust (e.g. parent or teacher). There is also a close in age exception if there is a "small difference in age". In a verdict on 30 March 2007, the Swedish Supreme Court ruled that a 17-year-old boy had not committed a criminal act by having sexual intercourse with a girl 14 years and 7 months old.

Articles
They who, with a child below fifteen years of age, has vaginal, anal or oral intercourse or a different sexual action which when considering the violations severity is comparable to intercourse, is sentenced for rape against child to prison for at least three years and at most six years. ... The first paragraph also applies to they who commits an action as described there against a child which has passed fifteen years but not eighteen years and who is descendant to the perpetrator or is under care by or has a similar relationship to the perpetrator, or for whose care or watch the perpetrator should be held responsible because of a government agency's decision.

Den som, med ett barn under femton år, genomför ett vaginalt, analt eller oralt samlag eller en annan sexuell handling som med hänsyn till kränkningens allvar är jämförlig med samlag, döms för våldtäkt mot barn till fängelse i lägst tre och högst sex år. ...

Första stycket gäller även den som begår en gärning som avses där mot ett barn som fyllt femton men inte arton år och som är avkomling till gärningsmannen eller står under fostran av eller har ett liknande förhållande till gärningsmannen, eller för vars vård eller tillsyn gärningsmannen ska svara på grund av en myndighets beslut.

— Section 4, Chapter 6, Swedish Penal Code

They who has committed an action ... shall not be held liable if it is obvious that the action was not a violation against the child considering the relative difference in age and development between they who committed the action and the child as well as the circumstances in general.
Den som har begått en gärning ... ska inte dömas till ansvar om det är uppenbart att gärningen inte inneburit något övergrepp mot barnet med hänsyn till den ringa skillnaden i ålder och utveckling mellan den som har begått gärningen och barnet samt omständigheterna i övrigt.

— Section 14, Chapter 6, Swedish Penal Code

=== History ===
Homosexual acts, both between men and between women, were prohibited in Sweden since 1864, then in 1944 homosexual acts became legal - but with a higher age of consent of 18 (21 if the younger part was in a situation of dependency) than for heterosexual acts, which was always set at 15. The age of consent was finally equalised to 15 regardless of sexual orientation in 1978.

Pornography laws were softened in the 1960s. In 1965 there was a review of previous laws governing pornography depicting children as part of the "child's rights to sexuality". From 1971 to 1980 it was legal to buy, sell, and possess child pornography that featured children as young as 10 or 11.

== Switzerland ==
The age of consent in Switzerland is 16, as specified by the Swiss Criminal Code. However, there exists a close-in-age exception if the difference between the ages of the participants is three years or less.

Articles
1. Anyone who commits a sexual act on a child below 16 years of age, anyone who induces a child of that age to commit a sexual act, anyone who involves a child of that age in a sexual act, is punished by a custodial sentence of up to five years or a financial penalty.
2. The act is not punishable if the age difference between the participants does not exceed three years.
1. Quiconque commet un acte d’ordre sexuel sur un enfant de moins de 16 ans, quiconque entraîne un enfant de cet âge à commettre un acte d’ordre sexuel, quiconque mêle un enfant de cet âge à un acte d’ordre sexuel, est puni d’une peine privative de liberté de cinq ans au plus ou d’une peine pécuniaire.
2. L’acte n’est pas punissable si la différence d’âge entre les participants ne dépasse pas trois ans.

— Article 187, Swiss Criminal Code

== Turkey ==
The age of consent in Turkey is the same as the age of majority, which is 18 (per Article 11 of the Turkish Civil Code).

According to Article 104 of the Turkish Penal Code, sexual intercourse with minors aged 15, 16 and 17 can only be prosecuted upon a complaint. However, if the offender is a person who is forbidden to marry the child by law or is a person who is obliged to take care of the child due to adoption or foster care, then the prosecution doesn't require a complaint and the punishment is aggravated.

Article 103 regulates any kind of sexual activity with minors under 15 (or minors under 18 who lack the ability to understand the legal meanings and consequences of such actions) as child sexual abuse.

Article 105 regulates the activities between first cousins, in order to preserve property rights, where no age of consent is recognized.

=== History ===
The age of consent in Turkey was set at 15 for both heterosexual and homosexual sex in the 1926 Penal Code, but this was modified in 1953. The age of consent was still 15, only for some instances, it was 18. The new penal code of 2004 sets the age of consent for both heterosexual and homosexual sex at 18, and non-penetrative sexual contact at 15, with some differences, such as the act of having sexual intercourse with a minor over 15 being punishable upon a complaint.

== Ukraine ==
The age of consent in Ukraine is set at 16 since 2018, regardless of gender and/or sexual orientation.

Article 155 states that sexual intercourse with a person under the age of 16 committed by a person over the age of 18 shall be punishable. Additionally, according to Article 152 (since January 2019) sexual intercourse with a person under the age of 14 (regardless of his/her voluntary consent) is a rape. The law no longer makes reference to the concept of "sexual maturity", which existed in the former legislative framework.

== United Kingdom and Crown dependencies ==
The United Kingdom is a political union of four separate countries and three distinct legal jurisdictions (England and Wales, Scotland, and Northern Ireland).

Age of consent is a matter devolved down to each legal jurisdiction within the union to decide upon; however, each UK nation has set the relevant legal age at 16.

=== England and Wales ===
The age of consent in England and Wales is 16 regardless of sexual orientation or gender, as specified by the Sexual Offences Act 2003.

The vast majority of law relating to sexual offences in England and Wales is laid out in legislation under the Sexual Offences Act 2003, which contains upwards of 140 sections, of which around 70 relate directly to sexual offences. The main sections that relate to sexual offences regarding children are sections 5–15. Sections 5–8 largely reiterate the adult offences of sections 1–4 – rape, assault by penetration, sexual assault, and causing a person to engage in sexual activity without consent – replacing the element of non-consent with the victim being under 13 – with higher maximum sentences in the latter two cases. Sections 9–12 define offences against a child under 13, or a minor under 16 whom the defendant does not reasonably believe is 16 or over. These offences are sexual activity with a child, meaning sexual touching (the same actus reus as sexual assault); causing or inciting a child to engage in sexual activity; engaging in sexual activity in the presence of a child for sexual gratification; and causing a child to watch a sexual act, meaning a third person or an image, for sexual gratification. Under section 13, these offences carry a lower penalty of imprisonment for a term not exceeding 6 months or a fine not exceeding the statutory maximum on a summary conviction or 5 years' imprisonment on conviction on indictment when committed by a person under 18.

Any person who engages in sexual intercourse with a person under age 16 could be prosecuted (unless they are under 10, the age of criminal responsibility). This therefore means that even sexual intercourse between willing people of a similar age (e.g., a 16-year-old and a 15-year-old) could result in the older person being liable for prosecution for committing a sexual offence. Because of this, guidelines were put in place on how to appropriately prosecute a person who had sexual intercourse with a person under the age of 16, depending on exactly how young a person under the age of 16 was at time the sexual intercourse took place. The Crown Prosecution Service generally has discretion to decide not to prosecute if the facts of the individual case do not warrant it, and the judge (or magistrates, as the case may be) has discretion to impose more lenient or more severe sentences, up to the legal limits, as the facts warrant. It is rare that prosecution would be brought against persons aged 13 or over engaging in sexual intercourse/activity willingly, as long as all persons involved were of similar age, and it did not involve other matters such as violence, abuse or blackmail.

Because it can be difficult to tell whether a teenager is over 16 or not, for the child sex offences in sections 9–13, it is a defence to show that the defendant reasonably believed the other person was 16 or over (for example, they look mature enough that they could plausibly be 16 and tell the defendant that they are). This defence is not available if the child was, in fact, under 13. There is thus a two-tier system by age, where sex with a person between 13 and 16 may be legal, but sex with a person under 13 never is.

The age of consent is 18 for a few purposes. Section 16 prohibits sexual activity with a minor under 18 by an adult in a position of trust, such as a carer or teacher, even if the minor in question is 16 or 17; however, this contains an exception for relationships beginning before the position of trust arose. Under section 47 it is an offence to pay for or promise payment for sexual services of a person under 18 where the client does not reasonably believe that person is over 18, or in any event for a person under 13.

Further reading:

- Criminal Law Amendment Act 1885
- Sexual Offences (Amendment) Act 2000

==== History ====
The age of consent for heterosexual acts in England was set at 12 in 1275 during the reign of Edward I. The wording had the meaning – "It shall be deemed illegal to ravage a maiden who is not of age" – at the time "of age" being 12. Therefore, there was technically no age of consent for the male participant. The English law became applicable in Wales following the Laws in Wales Acts (1536 and 1543). In medieval Welsh law there was no actual equivalent of the concept of the age of consent as such, but a girl was marriageable at 12–14 (the onset of puberty) and a fine was payable for the taking of a girl's maidenhood by force; the rules varied according to status and may not have been applied rigidly to commoners.

A concern that young girls were being sold into brothels led Parliament to raise the age of consent to 13 in 1875 under the Offences against the Person Act 1875. After W. T. Stead's Maiden Tribute articles, the Criminal Law Amendment Act 1885 raised the age of consent to 16.

Anal intercourse, both male-male and male-female, had been illegal and punishable by death since the Buggery Act 1533. In 1861, parliament passed the Offences against the Person Act 1861, which abolished the death penalty for anal intercourse. The Criminal Law Amendment Act 1885 extended buggery laws to outlaw any kind of sexual activity between males. It is common folklore that an amendment that would have criminalised lesbian acts was rejected by Queen Victoria because she refused to believe that some women did such things; but it is likelier that those presenting the amendment excluded it (as did the House of Lords 40 years later) on the assumption that it would give women ideas.

Male homosexual acts were decriminalised under the Sexual Offences Act 1967, Section 1, although the age of consent for such acts was set at 21, whereas the age of consent for heterosexual acts was 16; however, this particular legislation applied only in England and Wales.

In 1994, on the second reading of the Criminal Justice and Public Order Act 1994, the Conservative Member of Parliament Edwina Currie introduced an amendment to lower the age of consent for homosexual acts to 16, in line with that for heterosexual acts; the amendment was defeated by 308 votes to 280. A compromise amendment that lowered the age of consent to 18 was accepted by 427 votes to 162. Also during the readings were motions to equalise the age of consent to 17 for all, to maintain the age of consent for homosexual acts to 21, and a further attempt to lower the age of consent to 16, all of which were rejected.

In 1997, the European Court of Human Rights case of Sutherland v United Kingdom held that a higher age of consent for homosexuals than for heterosexuals was a breach of Article 14 in conjunction with Article 8 of the convention. In response, the Government introduced the Crime and Disorder Bill that contained a provision lowering the age of consent for homosexual acts to 16. Though accepted by the House of Commons, the provision was rejected by the House of Lords. The Sexual Offences (Amendment) Bill, introduced in 1998, contained a similar provision, but once again it was rejected by the House of Lords. The Bill was reintroduced in 2000 and, despite opposition from the House of Lords, was passed under the Parliament Act 1911 (which allows the House of Commons to overrule the House of Lords under certain circumstances). As the Scottish Parliament had been established prior to the reintroduction of the Bill, and the relevant legislation was a devolved issue, the consent of that Parliament under the Sewel Convention was required – had that consent not been granted, the Scottish provisions would have had to be removed and it would not have been possible to use the Parliament Act.

The Sexual Offences (Amendment) Act 2000 became law in January 2001 throughout the UK, and thus equalised, regardless of gender, the age of consent at 16 for both heterosexual and homosexual acts (including, for the first time, lesbian acts), except those taking place between a 16–17-year-old and someone "in a position of trust" (e.g. a teacher), where the age of consent was raised to 18.

The Sexual Offences Act 2003 officially ended the concept of buggery in British law, as technically, heterosexual anal intercourse had still been illegal until the passing of this law. The passing of this law meant that there was no legal difference made between vaginal and anal intercourse, as well as sexual touching and newly added oral penetration and penetration by other body parts than the penis or anything else. The Act also raised the legal age for pornography and prostitution from 16 to 18.

There have been various suggestions to lower the age of consent to 14. In 1998, the New Labour government proposed this; despite some left-wing and youth support, this had been dropped by early 2003 as lacking support. A decade later in early 2013, the suggestion by civil servants to lower the age of consent to 14 was rejected by the Conservative led coalition as "offensive" (at least under some circumstances) and attention was drawn to the impact of recent scandals on the reception to any proposals.

Following the Russell Brand scandal, considerations have been made to raise the age of consent from 16 to 18 to prevent grooming.

=== Scotland ===
The age of consent in Scotland is 16, regardless of sexual orientation or gender.

However, consensual sex with a girl aged between 13 and 15 is not rape, but a lesser offence. On 1 December 2010, this was given the specific name of "having intercourse with an older child" (a person between 13 and 15). Recently, this has caused a debate with family advocates and the Scottish government.

==== History ====
Male homosexual acts were illegal in Scotland until 1980 when they were decriminalised by the Criminal Justice (Scotland) Act 1980, Section 80, which specified an age of consent of 21. The Criminal Law (Consolidation) (Scotland) Act 1995 lowered the age of consent to 18 and this was further lowered to 16 by the Sexual Offences (Amendment) Act 2000 described above. Male rape was recognised along with a complete overhaul of sexual offences legislation under the Sexual Offences (Scotland) Act 2009 (in force from 1 December 2010, except for sections 52 and 53).

=== Northern Ireland ===
The age of consent in Northern Ireland is 16, regardless of gender or sexual orientation, as specified by the Sexual Offences (Northern Ireland) Order 2008.

==== History ====
From 1950 to 2008, the age of consent in Northern Ireland was 17, in line with the Republic of Ireland.

In 2008, the Sexual Offences (Northern Ireland) Order 2008 lowered the age of consent in Northern Ireland from 17 to 16, bringing the age of consent in line with the rest of the UK.

Gay male sexual conduct was illegal in Northern Ireland until 1982, when they were decriminalised by the Homosexual Offences (Northern Ireland) Order 1982, which specified an age of consent of 21 – in line with the rest of the UK at the time. The change was a result of the judgement in the European Court of Human Rights case of Dudgeon v United Kingdom (1981) in which the ECHR held that a prohibition on homosexual acts was a breach of Article 8 of the convention. The age of consent for gay male sexual conduct was lowered to 18 in 1994 when the Criminal Justice and Public Order Act 1994 was implemented (as to be in line with England and Wales). The age of consent in 2001 was then lowered to 17 for gay male sexual conduct (in line with heterosexual and lesbian sexual conduct), by the Sexual Offences (Amendment) Act 2000, Section 1. Then, in 2008, the Order mentioned above lowered the age of consent for all individuals to 16, bringing it into line with the rest of the UK.

=== Akrotiri and Dhekelia ===
For both of these Sovereign Base Areas (British military enclaves) on the island of Cyprus, the age of consent is 16.

=== Gibraltar ===
Since 2011, the age of consent is equal and gender-neutral at 16 in Gibraltar (a British overseas territory). The gender-neutral Crimes Bill 2011 passed the Gibraltar Parliament and got assented - implementing the 2011 Supreme Court of Gibraltar decision and by repealing and updating 140-year-old criminal laws of Gibraltar.

==== History ====
Male homosexual acts have been decriminalised in Gibraltar since 1993, where the age of consent was higher at 18 for gay men, 16 for lesbians and heterosexuals. Anal sex was illegal for heterosexuals regardless. An equal age of consent set at 16 and legalising heterosexual anal sex happened because of a Supreme Court decision in 2011. Then in 2011, the gender-neutral Crimes Act 2011 implemented an equal and gender-neutral age of consent of 16 and legalised anal sex for heterosexuals - reflecting the Supreme Court of Gibraltar's decision and by repealing and updating 140-year-old criminal laws of Gibraltar.

=== Guernsey (including Alderney, Herm and Sark) ===
Since 2012, the age of consent in the Bailiwick of Guernsey (a Crown Dependency including Alderney, Herm and Sark) is 16, regardless of gender and/or sexual orientation.

==== History ====
In 1983, male homosexual acts were decriminalised with the age of consent set at 21 (in line with the UK at that time). In 1999, the age of consent for male homosexual acts was lowered to 18. Then in 2012, the age of consent for male homosexual acts was equalised at 16, regardless of gender and/or sexual orientation.

=== Isle of Man ===
The age of consent in the Isle of Man, a Crown Dependency, is 16, last amended in 2006.

==== History ====
Prior to 1992, sodomy was illegal, then under the Sexual Offences (Isle of Man) Act 1992 (after assent) the age of consent was set at 21 for sodomy (in line with the UK at that time). Then in 2001, the age of consent for male homosexual acts was lowered to 18 under the Criminal Justice Act 2001. In 2006, under the Sexual Offences (Amendment) Act 2006 the age of consent was lowered to 16, and became gender-neutral for all sexual conduct, regardless of sexual orientation or gender.

=== Jersey ===
The age of consent in the Bailiwick of Jersey, a Crown Dependency, is 16.

==== History ====
Prior to 1990, sodomy was illegal in Jersey for both men and women until 1990 although the age of consent for homosexual acts other than sodomy was the same as for heterosexual acts. In 1990, the age of consent for sodomy between consenting males was set at 21 (the UK at that time maintained the age of consent of 21 for all homosexual acts between males). In 1995, the sodomy age of consent became 18 (under the Sexual Offences (Jersey) Law 1995). In 2007, the age of consent was lowered to 16, became gender-neutral for all sexual conduct (including sodomy); regardless of sexual orientation or gender.

== Vatican City ==
The age of consent in Vatican City is set at 18 for all unmarried persons (if married, the age of consent ranges between 14 and 16).

The general age of consent was raised from 12 to 18 by Law No. VIII of 11 July 2013 ("Supplementary Laws on Criminal Law Matters"), which is still in force. Article 4 of Law No. VIII defines "minor" for the purposes of that law to mean "every human being below the age of eighteen years". Article 8, paragraphs 1 through 4, establish criminal penalties for anyone who engages in sexual acts with a person below the age of 18. Paragraph 5 of Article 8 provides an exception to this by stating that "the offence does not exist if the sexual acts take place within a marriage".

Canon 1083 of the 1983 Code of Canon Law states that "A man before he has completed his sixteenth year of age and a woman before she has completed her fourteenth year of age cannot enter into a valid marriage". As such, the age of consent for married women is 14, while the age of consent for married men is 16.

== See also ==
- Age of consent
- Age of consent by country
- Ages of consent in Africa
- Ages of consent in Asia
- Ages of consent in North America
- Ages of consent in Oceania
- Ages of consent in South America
- Age-of-consent reform
- Comprehensive sex education
- Sex education
