= Norris v. Attorney General =

1983 Supreme Court of Ireland judgement

- Court: Supreme Court of Ireland
- Full case name: David Norris v. the Attorney General
- Decided: 22 March 1983
- Citations: [1983] IESC 3, [1984] IR 36

Case history
- Subsequent action: Norris v. Ireland

Court membership
- Judges sitting: O'Higgins CJ, Finlay P, Henchy, Griffin, McCarthy JJ

Case opinions
- Decision by: O'Higgins CJ
- Concurrence: Finlay P and Griffin J
- Dissent: Henchy and McCarthy JJ

Norris v. The Attorney General is a 1983 judgement from the Supreme Court of Ireland that held that the law which criminalised homosexuality was not against the Constitution of Ireland. David Norris was subsequently successful in the European Court of Human Rights, where in Norris v. Ireland (1988) they found that the law was in breach of Article 8 of the European Convention on Human Rights.

== Background ==
Sections 61 and 62 of the Offences Against the Person Act 1861 criminalised "buggery", which made sexual activity between two men illegal, and section 11 of the Criminal Law Amendment Act 1885 criminalised "gross indecency" between men. The law remained on the books when Ireland achieved independence from the UK.

In the UK, the law was repealed, and homosexual acts decriminalised: in 1967 in England and Wales with the Sexual Offences Act 1967; in Scotland by the Criminal Justice (Scotland) Act 1980; and in Northern Ireland by the Homosexual Offences (Northern Ireland) Order 1982.

The Constitution of Ireland came into force in 1937, and all laws that were on the books before then were carried over, unless they were "repugnant to the constitution".

== Case ==
David Norris, an Irish citizen and campaigner for gay rights, took and lost a case to the High Court in 1977 seeking a declaration that the laws of 1861 and 1885 which criminalised homosexual conduct were not in force since the enactment of the Constitution of Ireland. Article 50 of the Constitution provides that laws enacted before the Constitution that are inconsistent with it would no longer be in force.

Norris's Senior Counsel were Garrett Cooney and fellow member of the Campaign for Homosexual Law Reform, Mary Robinson, who in 1990 would become the first female President of Ireland.

=== Judgment ===
The Supreme Court rejected the appeal, citing the "Christian nature of the state".

On the ground of the Christian nature of our State and on the grounds that the deliberate practice of homosexuality is morally wrong, that it is damaging to the health both of individuals and the public and, finally, that it is potentially harmful to the institution of marriage, I can find no inconsistency with the Constitution in the laws which make such conduct criminal. It follows, in my view, that no right of privacy, as claimed by the plaintiff, can prevail against the operation of such criminal sanctions.

== Reaction ==
After the judgement was delivered, Norris immediately declared that he would take a case to the European Court of Human Rights.

== European Court of Human Rights Decision ==
Norris subsequently took a case to the European Court of Human Rights. In Norris v. Ireland (1988), the ECHR ruled, as it had done in Dudgeon v United Kingdom (1981) that the laws criminalising homosexuality were a breach of the Article 8 protection of privacy. In 1993, the Irish government decriminalised gay male sexual activity with the Criminal Law (Sexual Offences) Act 1993.

== See also ==
- David Norris
- Norris v. Ireland
- LGBT rights in the Republic of Ireland
