= Sutherland v United Kingdom =

UK LGBTQ rights legal case

Sutherland v United Kingdom originated as a complaint by Mr Euan Sutherland to the European Commission of Human Rights that the fixing of the minimum age for lawful homosexual activities at 18 rather than 16, as for heterosexual activities, violated his right to respect for private life under Article 8 of the European Convention for the Protection of Human Rights and Fundamental Freedoms. The complaint was first filed on 8 June 1994 and ultimately led to the equalisation of the age of consent for homosexual and heterosexual acts.

== Facts ==
The Applicant, Mr Euan Sutherland was born in 1977, and after realising he was homosexual, had his first sexual encounter with another homosexual man at the age of 16. Although the Applicant was never prosecuted, there was a justified fear that he may be since, in 1990, 455 prosecutions had given rise to 342 convictions and, in 1991, 213 prosecutions gave rise to 169 convictions. This fear led the Applicant to bring the complaint to the Commission.

Under section 12(1) of the Sexual Offences Act 1956 it was an offence for a person to commit buggery with another person and under section 13 it was an offence for a man to commit an act of "gross indecency" with another man, whether in public or private. The Sexual Offences Act 1967 stated that no offence is committed if both parties are aged 21 or over and consented to the acts.

== Judgement ==
The Commission considered the application and following a hearing published its findings on 1 July 1997. The published findings show that the Commission considered a very wide range of opinions and factors, including the rationale for a higher age of consent for homosexual acts, opinions from medical staff as to what a suitable age limit is and whether a different age for heterosexual and homosexual acts is discriminatory.

The commission, presided over by Stefan Trechsel, found that the existence of different age limits was discriminatory and that no valid grounds existed to justify that discrimination. They therefore found that the age of consent for homosexual acts should be lowered to 16. In arriving at their conclusion the commission cited their reasoning in the previous cases, Dudgeon v United Kingdom and Norris v. Ireland.

In response to the commission's findings the Applicant and the UK Government, on 13 October 1997, submitted an agreement that a Bill would be proposed to Parliament the summer of 1998 to reduce the age of consent for homosexual acts to 16. They agreed that once the legislation was passed the Government would pay reasonable costs and the parties would apply to the Court for approval of a friendly settlement.

The Government brought the Crime and Disorder Bill to Parliament in June 1998 which contained a provision to reduce the age of consent for homosexual acts to 16. Those provisions were accepted by the House of Commons, but were rejected by the House of Lords. The Sexual Offences (Amendment) Bill was introduced to the House of Commons on 16 December 1998 and the relevant provisions were again endorsed by that house, but were later rejected by the House of Lords.

The provisions were then reintroduced for a third time under the Parliament Acts 1911 and 1949 such they could pass into force after a delay of one year.

On 28 January 2000, the Bill was re-introduced before the House of Commons and was passed by 263 votes to 102. It was then introduced into the House of Lords on 29 February 2000, where, on 11 April 2000 its Second Reading was not opposed, but some Lords stated they would propose amendments. As a result, the Bill was adopted under the Parliament Acts at the end of the 2000 Parliamentary year and the Sexual Offences (Amendment) Act 2000 received Royal Assent on 30 November 2000 and was brought into force on 8 January 2001.

Following a series of requests for extensions, the Court received notification from the Government on 23 January 2001 that the age of consent had been equalised and then on 1 February 2001 that the Government had paid the Applicant's costs. Accordingly, on 27 March 2001, the case was struck out of the Court's lists.
