= 1981 in LGBTQ rights =

This is a list of notable events in the history of LGBT rights that took place in the year 1981.

== Events ==
=== February ===
- 5 – Toronto police raid city bathhouses, arresting 286 people and charging 20 for operating a brothel (see Operation Soap). No sex work was uncovered.
- 6 – About 3,000 protestors stage the largest-ever sit in protests in Toronto streets to decry city police raids on bath houses. This became seen as Toronto's version of the Stonewall Riots.
- 10 – In the United States, Christian advocacy group Moral Majority announces a $3 million fund to fight against homosexuality in San Francisco, California.
- 20 – Protest crowds in Toronto swell to 4,000 in the fight to stop police crackdown on bathhouses.

=== March ===
- 1 – The Billy DeFrank Lesbian and Gay Community Center first opens its doors in a two-room store front in downtown San Jose, California.
- 6 – Toronto Gay Community Council holds first meeting.

=== April ===
- 4 – First Gay Pride Parade takes place in Paris.

=== May ===
- In France, the government of François Mitterrand repeals Mirguet Amendment. A reform of the sex offences law equalises the age of consent (effect August 4 the following year).
- 14 – The Reagan administration cancels the White House's subscription to The Advocate.

=== June ===
- 5 – The United States Centers for Disease Control receives the first known reports of what would come to be known as acquired immune deficiency syndrome (AIDS), found in the gay communities of Los Angeles, New York City, and San Francisco.

=== July ===
- 3 – The New Democratic Party of Canada calls for amending the "bawdyhouse" section of the Canadian Criminal Code, which is often used to raid gay bathhouses.
- 3 - The New York Times prints the first story of what the CDC initially refers to as GRID (Gay Related Immune Deficiency).

=== October ===
- 22 — European Court of Human Rights judgment in Dudgeon v. United Kingdom evaluates Northern Ireland's criminalisation of homosexual acts between consenting adults as contrary to the right to respect to private life.

=== December ===
- 1 – The legislature of the Canadian province of Ontario defeats an amendment which would have added "sexual orientation" to the human rights code.

== See also ==
- Timeline of LGBT history – timeline of events from 12,000 BCE to present
- LGBT rights by country or territory – current legal status around the world
- LGBT social movements
