= Norris v. Ireland =

1988 European Court of Human Rights case

Decided 26 October 1988
- Full case name: David Norris v. Ireland
- Case: 6/1987/129/180
- Nationality of parties: Irish

Court composition
- President; R. Ryssdal
- Judges: J. Cremona; Thór Vilhjálmsson (jurist); F. Gölcüklü; F. Matscher; L.-E. Pettiti; Brian Walsh (judge); Vincent Evans; C. Russo; R. Bernhardt; A. Spielmann; Jan de Meyer; J.A. Carrillo Salcedo; N. Valticos

Legislation affecting
- Article 8 of the European Convention on Human Rights; Criminal Law Amendment Act 1885; Offences against the Person Act 1861; Dudgeon v United Kingdom

Norris v. Ireland was a case decided by the European Court of Human Rights (ECHR) in 1988, in which David Norris successfully charged that Ireland's criminalisation of certain homosexual acts between consenting adult men was in breach of Article 8 of the European Convention on Human Rights (right to respect for private and family life).

== Original case ==
The original case in the Irish courts was Norris v. Attorney General, introduced in 1977 and decided by the Supreme Court of Ireland in 1983. Norris's Senior Counsel was fellow member of the Campaign for Homosexual Law Reform, Mary Robinson, who in 1990 would become the first female President of Ireland. The Irish courts ruled that Norris's right to privacy was not violated by the Offences against the Person Act 1861 (criminalising "buggery") and the Criminal Law Amendment Act 1885 (criminalising "gross indecency").

== Case before the ECtHR ==
Norris appealed the Irish court's decision to the ECtHR in 1983. The Court passed judgment in 1988, deciding in Norris's favour on grounds similar to those of its 1981 decision in Dudgeon v United Kingdom.

The laws impugned by the judgment were eventually repealed by the Criminal Law (Sexual Offences) Act, 1993.

== See also ==
- David Norris
- Dudgeon v United Kingdom
- LGBT rights in the Republic of Ireland
- List of LGBT-related European Court of Human Rights cases

== Notes ==
- "Case of Norris v. Ireland (Application no. 10581/83)". European Court of Human Rights. 26 October 1988.
- Norris v. A.G. [1983] IESC 3, [1984] IR 36 (22 April 1983), Supreme Court (Ireland)
