= Campaign for Homosexual Law Reform =

Irish movement aimed at decriminalising homosexuality

The Campaign for Homosexual Law Reform was an organisation set up to campaign for the decriminalisation of homosexuality in the Republic of Ireland and Northern Ireland in the 1970s. Its most prominent leader was David Norris, an English studies lecturer in Trinity College Dublin, Joycean scholar and from the 1980s to the present a member of Seanad Éireann.

== History ==
While serving as a lecturer at Trinity College, Norris and a group of other students informally established the Sexual Liberation Movement in 1974. It was short-lived, but two of the splinter organizations formed on campus were the Dublin University Gay Society, the first long-term LGBT rights organization in Ireland, and a group of law students known as the Campaign for Homosexual Law Reform.

Its first legal advisor was Mary McAleese, Reid Professor of Law at Trinity College Dublin, future President of Ireland; she served as legal advisor from 1975 to 1979, when she left her professorial position to join RTÉ. She was succeeded in that role in the 1980s by Mary Robinson, a former Reid Professor of Law and then-Trinity College Senator, who later became the first female President of Ireland.

Norris took a case to the Irish High Court in 1980 seeking a declaration that the laws of 1861 and 1885 which criminalised homosexual conduct were not in force since the enactment of the Constitution of Ireland. Article 50 of the Constitution provides that laws enacted before the Constitution that are inconsistent with it would no longer be in force. The case (Norris v. Attorney General) was lost on legal grounds and the decision was upheld on appeal to the Supreme Court of Ireland which referred in its judgment to Christian moral teaching and the needs of society.

Norris then took a case in 1983 to the European Court of Human Rights claiming that the Irish laws breached the state's obligations under Article 8 of the Convention for the Protection of Human Rights and Fundamental Freedoms, regarding respect for private life (Norris v. Ireland). In a 1988 ruling, the court found that the Irish laws were in breach of the convention and directed the state to pay costs to Norris.

No reform action was taken by the government of Taoiseach Charles Haughey. When Albert Reynolds succeeded as Taoiseach in February 1992, he declared that it was low on his list of priorities. However, in his subsequent Fianna Fáil/Labour Party coalition government formed in January 1993, as a result of pressure from the Labour Party the laws were reformed by the Minister for Justice, Máire Geoghegan-Quinn in 1993. She was noted for insisting that an equal age of consent be provided for homosexuals and heterosexuals alike.

== See also ==
- LGBT rights in the Republic of Ireland
- Recognition of same-sex unions in the Republic of Ireland
- List of LGBT rights organizations
- Norris v. Attorney General
- Norris v. Ireland
