= Sexual Offences (Amendment) Act 2000 =

Act of Parliament of the United Kingdom

Sexual Offences (Amendment) Act 2000 (Note: Section 7(1).)
- Act of Parliament
- Parliament of the United Kingdom
- Long title: An Act to reduce the age at which, and to make provision with respect to the circumstances in which, certain sexual acts are lawful; to make it an offence for a person aged 18 or over to engage in sexual activity with or directed towards a person under that age if he is in a position of trust in relation to that person; and for connected purposes.
- Citation: 2000 c.44
- Territorial extent: United Kingdom (Note: Section 7(4).)

Dates
- Royal assent: 30 November 2000
- Commencement: Various (Note: Section 7(3).)
Other legislation
Amends	Sexual Offences Act 1956; Sexual Offences Act 1967; Homosexual Offences (Northern Ireland) Order 1982; Criminal Justice Act 1991; Criminal Justice and Public Order Act 1994; Criminal Law (Consolidation) (Scotland) Act 1995; Sex Offenders Act 1997
Amended by	Sexual Offences Act 2003; Civil Partnership Act 2004; Mental Health (Care and Treatment) (Scotland) Act 2003 (Modification of Enactments) Order 2005; Sexual Offences (Scotland) Act 2009

Status: Partially repealed

Text of statute as originally enacted

Revised text of statute as amended

The Sexual Offences (Amendment) Act 2000 (c. 44) is an act of the Parliament of the United Kingdom.

== Background ==
An attempt to equalise the age of consent for heterosexual and homosexual sex was made in 1994, when Conservative MP Edwina Currie proposed an amendment to that effect to the Criminal Justice and Public Order Bill. Even though over forty Tory MPs joined Currie, the measure was lost by twenty-seven votes. Immediately afterwards, an amendment to reduce the age of consent for homosexual sexual activities from twenty-one to eighteen was agreed to by a vote 427 to 162.

In 1996, the European Court of Human Rights heard Morris v. The United Kingdom and Sutherland v. the United Kingdom, cases brought by Chris Morris and Euan Sutherland challenging the inequality inherent in having different ages of consent. The government stated its intention to legislate to negate the court cases, which were put on hold.

On 22 June 1998, during consideration of the Crime and Disorder Bill by the House of Commons, Labour MP Ann Keen proposed an amendment adding a new clause equalising the age of consent. Keen's motion passed by a vote of 336 to 129 (a majority of 207). On 22 July, following a concerted campaign by Conservative peer Baroness Young, the House of Lords voted 290–122 (a majority of 168) to disagree with the amendment. Not wishing to lose the whole bill, the government allowed the issue to be dropped.

== Passage ==
On 16 December 1998, the government introduced the bill which would have eventually become this Act. MPs from all major parties were permitted a conscience vote. On 25 January 1999, the bill passed its third reading in the House of Commons by a vote of 282 to 81, but the House of Lords rejected it once again, this time by a vote of 222 to 146 (a majority of 76).

On 19 January 2000, the newly established Scottish Parliament passed by a vote of 90 to 16 a non-binding motion "that the Parliament endorses the principles of equalising the age of consent for homosexual and heterosexual activity and creating a new criminal offence of breach of trust as set out in the Sexual Offences (Amendment) Bill considered by the UK Parliament in the 1998-99 parliamentary session and agrees that the UK Parliament should consider any bill introduced in the same terms in the current session".

On 28 January 2000, the government reintroduced the bill: on 28 February, the Commons voted 317–117 to grant it a third reading. Since the Commons had passed it in two successive sessions of Parliament, the Parliament Acts 1911 and 1949 could have been used to enact the bill had the House of Lords not passed it before the end of the session (regardless of whether the bill had been outright rejected or simply not put up to a vote). The Lords passed the bill at second reading, but during committee stage, by a vote of 205 to 144 (a majority of 61), they agreed to an amendment which would have maintained the age of consent for anal sex (whether with a male or with a female) at 18. The Government (which is in charge of parliamentary business in both Houses and opposed this change) did not allow the Lords a third reading vote on the amended bill. At the end of the session, on 30 November 2000, then-Speaker of the House of Commons Michael Martin certified that the procedure set out in the Parliament Acts had been complied with. The bill received royal assent a few hours later, and was enacted as the Sexual Offences (Amendment) Act 2000; its provisions came into force throughout the UK on 8 January 2001.

== Provisions ==
It set the age of consent for male homosexual sexual activities and for heterosexual anal sex at 16 (17 in Northern Ireland), which had long been the age of consent for all other types of sexual activities, such as vaginal sex or lesbian sex.

As such, it made the age of consent for all types of sexual acts equal, without discriminating on the basis of the type of act or of the sexes of those involved in the act. It also introduced the new offence of "having sexual intercourse or engaging in any other sexual activity with a person under 18 if in a position of trust in relation to that person".

== Aftermath ==
The Sexual Offences Act 2003 and the Sexual Offences (Scotland) Act 2009, which consolidated most previous sexual offences legislation, kept in place the equal age of consent achieved by the act.

=== Legal challenge to the validity of the Parliament Act 1949 ===
The fact the bill had been enacted without the Lords' consent became significant in the wake of passage of the Hunting Act 2004, which had also been passed using the Parliament Acts. The passage of that act was challenged in the case of R (Jackson) v Attorney General on the basis that the Parliament Act 1949 itself had been unlawfully passed. If the latter point were true, then the Sexual Offences (Amendment) Act 2000 would also be invalid, though this would have only had an effect in Scotland, since in England and Wales and Northern Ireland the provisions had been consolidated in legislation not passed under the Parliament Acts. The challenge to the Hunting Act was ultimately unsuccessful.

== See also ==
- Sexual Offences Act
- LGBT rights in the United Kingdom
