= Homosexual Offences (Northern Ireland) Order 1982 =

United Kingdom statutory instrument

Homosexual Offences (Northern Ireland) Order 1982 (Note: Article 1(1).)
- Statutory Instrument
- Parliament of the United Kingdom
- Citation: SI 1982/1536 (N.I. 19)
- Territorial extent: Northern Ireland

Dates
- Made: 27 October 1982
- Commencement: 9 December 1982 (Note: Article 1(2).)

Other legislation
- Made under: Northern Ireland Act 1974
- Amended by: Criminal Justice and Public Order Act 1994; Sexual Offences (Amendment) Act 2000; Sexual Offences Act 2003
- Relates to: Sexual Offences Act 1967

Status: Amended

Text of statute as originally enacted

Revised text of statute as amended

Text of the Homosexual Offences (Northern Ireland) Order 1982 as in force today (including any amendments) within the United Kingdom, from legislation.gov.uk.

The Homosexual Offences (Northern Ireland) Order 1982 (SI 1982/1536 (N.I. 19)), is an order in Council which decriminalised homosexual acts between two consenting men in Northern Ireland.

== Provisions ==
The order was adopted as a result of a European Court of Human Rights case, Dudgeon v. United Kingdom (1981), which ruled that Northern Ireland's criminalisation of homosexual acts between consenting adults was a violation of Article 8 of the European Convention on Human Rights.

A draft of the order, laid before Parliament in July 1982, was approved by the House of Commons on 25 October by a vote of 168 to 21, and by the House of Lords on 26 October by simple voice vote.

The homosexual age of consent fixed by the Order (21) was higher than the heterosexual age of consent in the rest of the United Kingdom, which had been set at 16 for decades, and also higher than the heterosexual age of consent in Northern Ireland, which had been set at 17 for decades, but was equal to the homosexual age of consent in England, which was also 21 at this time. The ages of consent for homosexual and heterosexual acts in Northern Ireland were eventually equalised at 17 by the Parliament of the United Kingdom with the passage of the Sexual Offences (Amendment) Act 2000.

To bring Northern Ireland in line with the rest of the United Kingdom, the Sexual Offences (Northern Ireland) Order 2008 (SI 2008/1769) reduced the age of consent to 16.

== Implementation ==
The order came into effect on 9 December 1982.

== See also ==
- LGBT rights in Northern Ireland
- Sexual Offences Act 1967, the act which decriminalized male homosexual acts in England and Wales.
- Criminal Justice (Scotland) Act 1980, the act which decriminalized male homosexual acts in Scotland.
