= Sexual Offences Act 1967 =

Act of the Parliament of the United Kingdom

Sexual Offences Act 1967 (Note: Section 11(1).)
- Act of Parliament
- Parliament of the United Kingdom
- Long title: An Act to amend the law of England and Wales relating to homosexual acts.
- Citation: 1967 c. 60
- Introduced by: Leo Abse (Commons); Lord Arran (Lords)
- Territorial extent: England & Wales (Note: Section 11(5).)

Dates
- Royal assent: 27 July 1967
- Commencement: 27 July 1967 (Note: The Acts of Parliament (Commencement) Act 1793.)
Other legislation
Amends	Magistrates' Courts Act 1952; Sexual Offences Act 1956
Amended by	Criminal Law Act 1977; Criminal Attempts Act 1981; Criminal Justice and Public Order Act 1994; Sexual Offences Act 2003
Relates to	Criminal Justice (Scotland) Act 1980; Homosexual Offences (Northern Ireland) Order 1982; Criminal Justice and Public Order Act 1994; Sexual Offences (Amendment) Act 2000

Status: Partially repealed

Text of statute as originally enacted

Revised text of statute as amended

Text of the Sexual Offences Act 1967 as in force today (including any amendments) within the United Kingdom, from legislation.gov.uk.

The Sexual Offences Act 1967 (c. 60) is an act of the Parliament of the United Kingdom. It legalised homosexual acts in England and Wales, on the condition that they were consensual, in private and between two men who had attained the age of 21. The law was extended to Scotland by the Criminal Justice (Scotland) Act 1980 and to Northern Ireland by the Homosexual Offences (Northern Ireland) Order 1982.

== Background ==
Homosexual activity between men had been a criminal offence in England and Wales since the Middle Ages. Before the Reformation it was punished by ecclesiastical courts; the Buggery Act 1533 transferred the jurisdiction to the royal courts, with the penalties including death. With many revisions, this legislation remained in force until the enactment of the Offences Against the Person Act 1828, or "Lord Lansdowne's Act", which retained capital punishment as a possible sentence for the crime. The Victorian era saw the punishments shift to being more lenient but also more enforceable: the Offences Against the Person Act 1861 abolished the death penalty, while the Labouchere Amendment of 1885 criminalised all homosexual activity between men besides anal intercourse. There was never an explicit ban on homosexual activity between women.

In the 1950s, there was an increase of prosecutions against homosexual men and several well-known figures were convicted. The government set up a committee led by John Wolfenden to consider the laws on homosexuality. In 1957, the committee published the Wolfenden report, which recommended the decriminalisation of homosexual activity between men above the age of 21. The position was summarised by the committee as follows: "unless a deliberate attempt be made by society through the agency of the law to equate the sphere of crime with that of sin, there must remain a realm of private morality and immorality, which is, in brief and crude terms, not the law's business." However, the government of Harold Macmillan did not act upon its recommendations, due to fears of a public backlash.

On 29 June 1960, the House of Commons, by a majority of 114 (99 Ayes to 213 Noes), voted against a motion endorsing the Wolfenden Committee's recommendations.

Public debate began to change because of the actions of advocacy groups, as well as the effect of the 1961 Dirk Bogarde film Victim, which was the first major production to even mention the term "homosexual" and had as its main subject the prosecution of homosexuals in the UK, and how this encouraged blackmail. It made the topic accessible to a greater part of the public, and in its wake approval for a repeal of homosexual prohibition went above 50%.

== Legislation and debate ==
After the 1964 United Kingdom general election, which narrowly elected a Labour government, members of both Houses of Parliament became increasingly sympathetic to changing the law. On 26 May 1965, Leo Abse introduced a Ten Minute Rule Bill to decriminalise consensual and private sex between men over the age of 21. The House of Commons voted down the proposal on first reading by 178 Noes to 159 Ayes. The small margin of only nineteen was seen as a significant change of opinion in the House of Commons.

On 28 October 1965, the House of Lords passed by a vote of 96 to 31 a Bill implementing the Wolfenden Report's recommendations; the draft law, which had been introduced by Conservative Peer Lord Arran, was supported, among others, by Archbishop of Canterbury Michael Ramsey and many high-ranking members of the Church of England. The Bill was subsequently introduced by Conservative MP Humphry Berkeley in the House of Commons, where it passed its second reading 164–107 on 11 February 1966. Berkeley had added a provision clarifying that the Bill would not extend to Scotland, convincing some socially conservative Scottish MPs not to vote against. The Bill's consideration was interrupted by the dissolution of Parliament for the 1966 general election, which resulted, among other things, in Berkeley losing his seat; nonetheless, Labour's decisive victory increased the number of MPs who were likely to support decriminalising homosexuality.

On 26 April 1966, Lord Arran introduced in the House of Lords the Sexual Offences Bill, which passed on 16 June 1966 by a vote of 78 to 60. Immediately thereafter, Leo Abse, again under the Ten Minute Rule, introduced in the House of Commons the Sexual Offences (No. 2) Bill, a slightly modified version of Lord Arran's Bill. After the Bill was granted a first reading by a vote of 244 to 100, the Government (which is in charge of parliamentary business on all days other than Friday) decided to allot additional parliamentary time to the Bill, since it had become clear there was a majority in favour of it.

The decriminalisation of homosexuality was one of multiple liberal social reforms to be passed under Wilson's 1966–1970 government and the wider move towards a "permissive society". Other reforms of the era included the legalisation of abortion the same year, the relaxation of divorce laws and the abolition of theatre censorship and capital punishment. These reforms arose due to several separate campaigns benefiting from growing public support and Labour's large majority, rather than from central government leadership. Wilson himself had no enthusiasm for moral legislation, (Note: Wilson's 790-page "The Labour Government 1964–70: a Personal Record" contains no index entry for abortion, or for David Steel who sponsored abortion law reform, no index entry for homosexuality or for Leo Abse who sponsored reform in this area, no entry for divorce, or for censorship. The exception to this pattern is the abolition of capital punishment, which Wilson had consistently supported, and which is discussed at some length in his book.) but there were Labour frontbenchers who supported the bill, including Roy Jenkins, the Home Secretary.

The Sexual Offences (No. 2) Bill ultimately passed in the House of Commons on 4 July (Note: Debate on the Bill had begun in 3 July, but went on past midnight.) by a vote of 99 to 14 (a majority of 85) and in the House of Lords on 13 July by a vote of 111 to 48 (a majority of 63). (Note: The vote and date mentioned make reference to the second reading of the Bill. Its third reading, which actually took place on 21 July, was purely pro forma, with opponents not taking part in the vote since they knew they lacked the numbers necessary to make the measure fail.) It received royal assent on 27 July, becoming the Sexual Offences Act 1967.

=== House of Commons ===
Sexual Offences (No. 2) Bill – Third Reading 4 July 1967 Note: absent Members are not listed
Party	Ayes	Noes	Present (Speaker)
Labour	84 (+1 Teller): Abse, Leo; Albu, Austen; Allaun, Frank (Salford, E.); Allen, Scholefield; Archer, Peter; Atkinson, Norman (Tottenham); Barnes, Michael; Benn, Rt. Hn. Anthony Wedgwood; Booth, Albert; Cant, R. B.; Brooks, Edwin; Carmichael, Neil; Chapman, Donald; Crawahaw, Richard; Crossman, Rt. Hn. Richard; Dalyell, Tam; Dell, Edmund; Diamond, Rt. Hn. John; Dunnett, Jack; Ellis, John; English, Michael; Ensor, David; Faulds, Andrew; Fitch, Alan (Wigan); Fletcher, Ted (Darlington); Foot, Michael (Ebbw Vale); Gardner, Tony; Ginsburg, David; Hale, Leslie (Oldham, W; Hamling, William; Haseldine, Norman; Hobden, Dennis (Brighton, K'town); Hooley, Frank; Houghton, Rt. Hn. Douglas; Howell, Denis (Small Heath); Huckfield, L; Hughes, Emrys (Ayrshire, S.); Jackson, Colin (B'h'se & Spenb'gh); Jackson, Peter M. (High Peak); Jeger, Mrs.Lena (H'b'n&St. P'cras, S.); Jenkins, Hugh (Putney); Jenkins, Rt. Hn. Roy (Stechford); Jones, Rt. Hn. Sir Elwyn (W. Ham, S.); Judd, Frank; Kerr, Mrs. Anne (R'ter & Chatham); Kerr, Dr. David (W'worth, Central); Kerr, Russell (Feltham); Luard, Evan; Lyon, Alexander (York); MacDermot, Niall; Macdonald, A. H.; Mackintosh, John P.; McNamara, J. Kevin; Marquand, David; Mendeleon, J. J.; Mikardo, Ian; Newens, Stan; Noel-Baker, Francis (Swindon); Orme, Stanley; Owen, Dr. David (Plymouth, S'tn); Pannell, Rt. Hn. Charles; Parkyn, Brian (Bedford); Pavitt, Laurence; Reynolds, G. W.; Robinson, W. O. J. (Walth'stow, E.); Rowland, Christopher (Meriden); Rowlands, E. (Cardiff, N.); Ryan, John; Sharples, Richard; Shaw, Arnold (Ilford, S.); Shore, Peter (Stepney); Silkin, Rt. Hn. John (Deptford); Silverman, Julius (Aston; Skeffington, Arthur; Stonehouse, John; Strauss, Rt. Hn. G. R.; Swingler, Stephen; Taverne, Dick; Whitaker, Ben; White, Mrs. Eirene; Williams, Alan Lee (Hornchurch); Williams, Mrs. Shirley (Hitchin); Wilson, William (Coventry, S.); Yates, Victor; Mr. Eric G. Varley (TELLER)	2: Mahon, Peter (Preston, S.); Morgan, Elystan	—N/a
Conservative	11 (+1 Teller): Boyle, Rt. Hn. Sir Edward; Channon, H. P. G.; Fraser, Rt. Hn. Hugh (St'fford&Stone); Hunt, John; Kirk, Peter; Longden, Gilbert; Montgomery, Fergus; Ridley, Hn. Nicholas; Walters, Dennis; Walker-Smith, Rt. Hn. Sir Derek; Worsley, Marcus; Mr. Ian Gilmour (TELLER)	12 (+2 Tellers): Cordle, John; Drayson, G. B.; Farr, John; Giles, Rear-Adm. Morgan; Goodhew, Victor; Legge-Bourke, Sir Harry; Hamilton, Michael (Salisbury); Mawby, Ray; Page, Graham (Crosby); Percival, Ian; Sinclair, Sir George; Taylor, Edward M.(G'gow, Cathcart); Sir Charles Taylor (TELLER); Mr. James Allason (TELLER)	—N/a
Liberal	4: Lubbock, Eric; Pardoe, John; Steel, David (Roxburgh); Thorpe, Rt. Hn. Jeremy	—N/a	—N/a
Non-partisan	—N/a	—N/a	1: Rt. Hn. Horace King
Total	99 (+2 Tellers)	14 (+2 Tellers)	1

=== House of Lords ===
Sexual Offences (No. 2) Bill – Second Reading 13 July 1967 Note: absent Members are not listed
Party	Contents	Not Contents
Crossbench/ Party affiliation unknown	54: Addison, V.; Ailwyn, L.; Amherst, E.; Annan, L.; Archibald, L.; Asquith of Yarnbury, Bs.; Bedford, D. [Teller.]; Boston, L.; Caccia, L.; Chelmsford, V.; Colgrain, L.; Cork and Orrery, E.; Cranbrook, E.; Darwen, L.; Drogheda, E.; Dudley, L.; Effingham, E.; Faringdon, L.; Fleck, L.; Francis-Williams, L.; Geddes, L.; Glasgow, E.; Harvey of Tasburgh, L.; Hayter, L.; Hertford, M.; Killearn, L.; Kinross, L.; Latham, L.; Lindsey, and Abingdon, E.; Llewelyn-Davies, L.; Lloyd of Hampstead, L.; Monson, L.; Morris of Kenwood, L.; Mountevans, L.; Mowbray and Stourton, L.; Norwich, V.; Parker of Waddington, L.; Platt, L.; Plummer, Bs.; Rathcreedan, L.; Ritchie of Dundee, L.; Sainsbury, L.; St. Davids, V.; St. Just, L.; Sempill, L.; Sherfield, L.; Stocks, Bs.; Strang, L; Strange of Knokin, Bs.; Teynham, L.; Thurlow, L.; Wedgwood, L.; Wellington, D.; Wootton of Abinger, Bs.	24: Allerton, L.; Ampthill, L.; Balerno, L.; Craigavon, V.; Cullen of Ashbourne, L.; Daventry, V.; Fortescue, E.; Grenfell, L.; Hankey, L.; Iddesleigh, E.; Kilmarnock, L.; Kirkwood, L.; Latymer, L.; Limerick, E.; MacAndrew, L.; MacLeod of Fuinary, L.; Merrivale, L.; Merrivale, L.; Milverton, L.; Morton of Henryton, L.; Oakshott, L.; Popplewell, L.; Rowallan, L.; Shannon, E.
Labour	28: Beswick, L.; Bowles, L.; Brockway, L.; Burden, L.; Chorley, L.; Collison, L.; Cooper of Stockton Heath, L.; Donovan, L.; Gaitskell, Bs.; Gardiner, L. (L. Chancellor.); Gifford, L.; Kennet, L.; Leatherland, L.; Longford, E. (L. Privy Seal.); Mitchison, L.; Ponsonby of Shulbrede, L.; Burton of Coventry, Bs.; Royle, L.; Segal, L.; Serota, Bs.; Shackleton, L.; Soper, L.; Sorensen, L.; Stonham, L.; Stow Hill, L.; Strabolgi, L.; Walston, L.; Winterbottom, L.;	9: Blyton, L.; Buckinghamshire, E.; Crook, L.; Hall, V.; Hilton of Upton, L.; Lindgren, L.; Peddie, L.; Rowley, L.; Shepherd, L.;
Conservative	15: Amory, V.; Arran, E. [Teller.]; Blackford, L.; Denham, L.; Elliot of Harwood, Bs.; Emmet of Amberley, Bs.; Ferrers, E.; Hacking, L.; Boothby, L.; Jellicoe, E.; Kinnoull, E.; Listowel, E.; McCorquodale of Newton, L.; Sandford, L.; Ward of Witley, V.;	13: Aldington, L.; Buckinghamshire, E.; Dilhorne, V. [Teller.]; Ferrier, L.; Grimston of Westbury, L.; Horsbrugh, Bs.; Ilford, L.; Lucas of Chilworth, L.; Massereene and Ferrard, V.; Monsell, V.; St. Aldwyn, E.; Salisbury, M. [Teller.]; Stuart of Findhorn, V.
Liberal	8: Airedale, L.; Amulree, L.; Barrington, V.; Byers, L.; Grantchester, L.; Henley, L.; Ogmore, L.; Rea, L.; Wells-Pestell, L.	—N/a
Bishops	3: Canterbury, Abp.; London, Bp.; Southwark, Bp.	—N/a
Scottish Conservatives	—N/a	2: Kilmany, L.; Strathclyde, L.
National Liberal	1: Drumalbyn, L.	—N/a
Ind. Unionist	1: Jessel, L.	—N/a
Total	111	48

The proposal legalised acts that met the conditions of being between two consenting adults in private. It did not apply to the Merchant Navy or the Armed Forces, nor to Scotland and Northern Ireland. In 1980, David Steel MP stated "I remember a conversation with the then sponsor of the Bill in 1965, Mr. Humphry Berkeley, in which I asked him why he proposed to cover only England and Wales. He was open about it. He said that the Bill was discussed on a Friday and that if he included Scotland in it most of the Scottish Members would stay to vote against it. Probably that was wise and sound judgment on his part". As with the Wolfenden report's proposal, the bill set the age of consent for homosexual activity to 21, five years higher than for heterosexual activity. It did not delete the offences of buggery and gross indecency. Men could still be prosecuted for these offences if their actions did not meet the strict requirements of the bill. For the first time, however, the maximum penalties were differentiated, depending upon why the relevant sexual act was still illegal: whether there was a lack of consent, the age requirement was not satisfied, or the act was not in private.

=== Attitudes towards decriminalisation ===
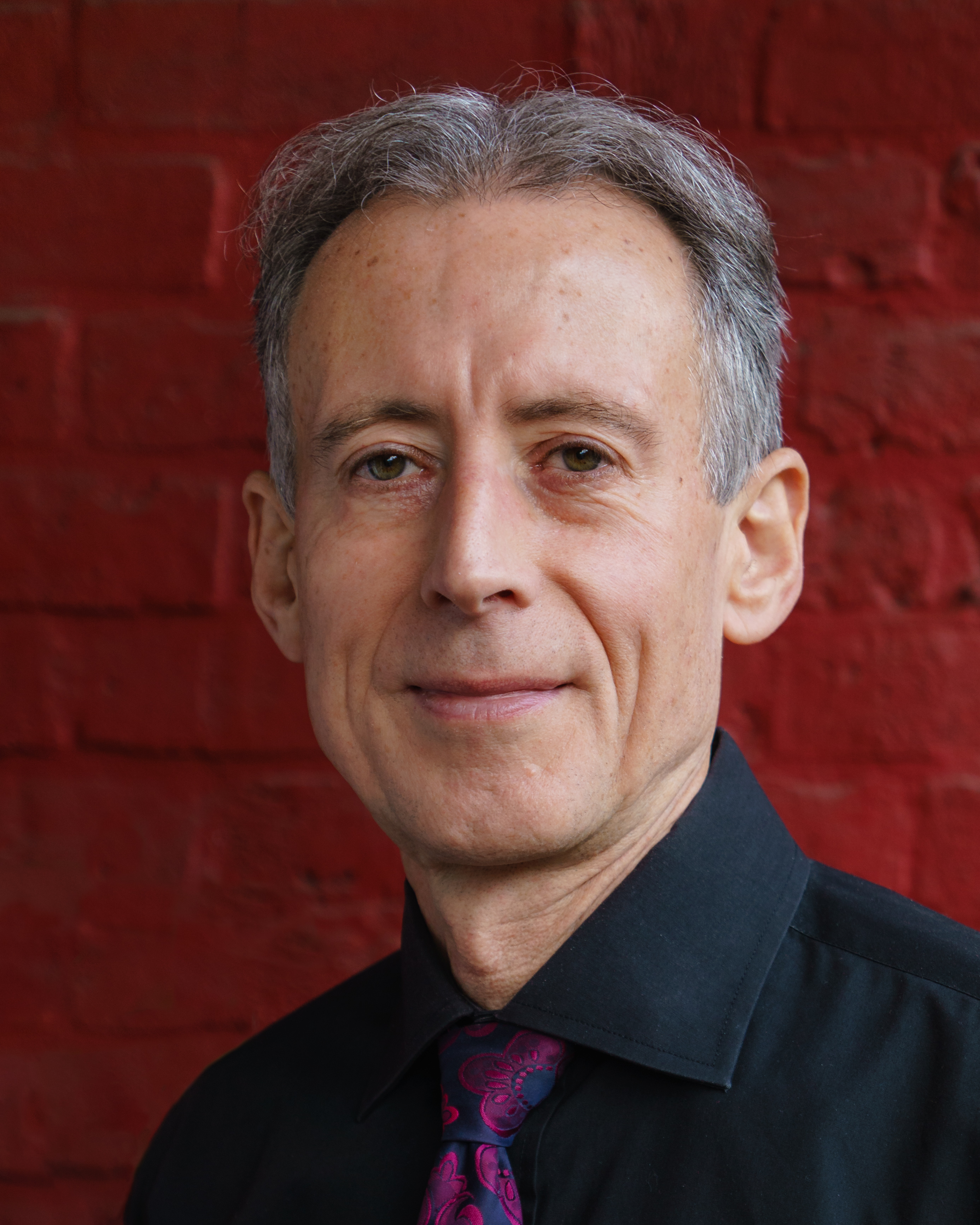
LGBT+ rights campaigner Peter Tatchell

According to gay activist Peter Tatchell, dissent against the bill could be summed up by the Earl of Dudley's 16 June 1966 statement that "[homosexuals] are the most disgusting people in the world ... Prison is much too good a place for them; in fact, that is a place where many of them like to go—for obvious reasons." Even proponents of the bill did not condone homosexuality, but instead argued that it was not within the responsibility of the criminal law to penalise homosexual men, who were already the object of ridicule and derision. Roy Jenkins captured the government's attitude: "those who suffer from this disability carry a great weight of shame all their lives" (quoted during parliamentary debate by The Times on 4 July 1967). After its passage, Lord Arran said, "I ask those [homosexuals] to show their thanks by comporting themselves quietly and with dignity ... any form of ostentatious behaviour now or in the future or any form of public flaunting would be utterly distasteful ... [And] make the sponsors of this bill regret that they had done what they had done".

==== Political parties ====
The Bill which would ultimately become the Sexual Offences Act 1967 had twelve sponsors, of which six belonged to the Labour Party (Leo Abse, Michael Foot, John Horner, Charles Pannell, George Strauss, Eric Varley), five to the Conservative Party (Hugh Fraser, Ian Gilmour, Peter Rawlinson, Norman St. John-Stevas and Richard Wood) and one to the Liberal Party (Jo Grimond).

On all of the Bill's stages, most of the votes in favour of it came from Labour and Liberal MPs, while most votes against it came from Conservative MPs; nonetheless, support for the Bill cut through party ranks, with prominent Conservatives Margaret Thatcher and Enoch Powell supporting the Bill during its first two readings. The coalition in favour of the bill was later described as "a combination of Gaitskellites and future Thatcherites".

==== Opinion polling ====
In 1965, an opinion poll commissioned by the Daily Mail found that 63% of respondents did not believe that homosexuality should be a crime while only 36% agreed it should, although 93% agreed that homosexual men were "in need of medical or psychiatric treatment".

== Legacy ==
In BBC History, Florence Sutcliffe-Braithwaite wrote "This was a hugely important moment in the history of homosexuality in Britain – but it wasn't a moment of sudden liberation for gay men – and nor was it intended to be." One particularly important consequence was the increased freedom of assembly for gay rights groups, leading to an increase in gay rights activism in the 1970s. Conversely, there was a clampdown on the homosexual activities that were not protected by the law. In the decade after its passage, prosecutions for gross indecency involving males tripled.

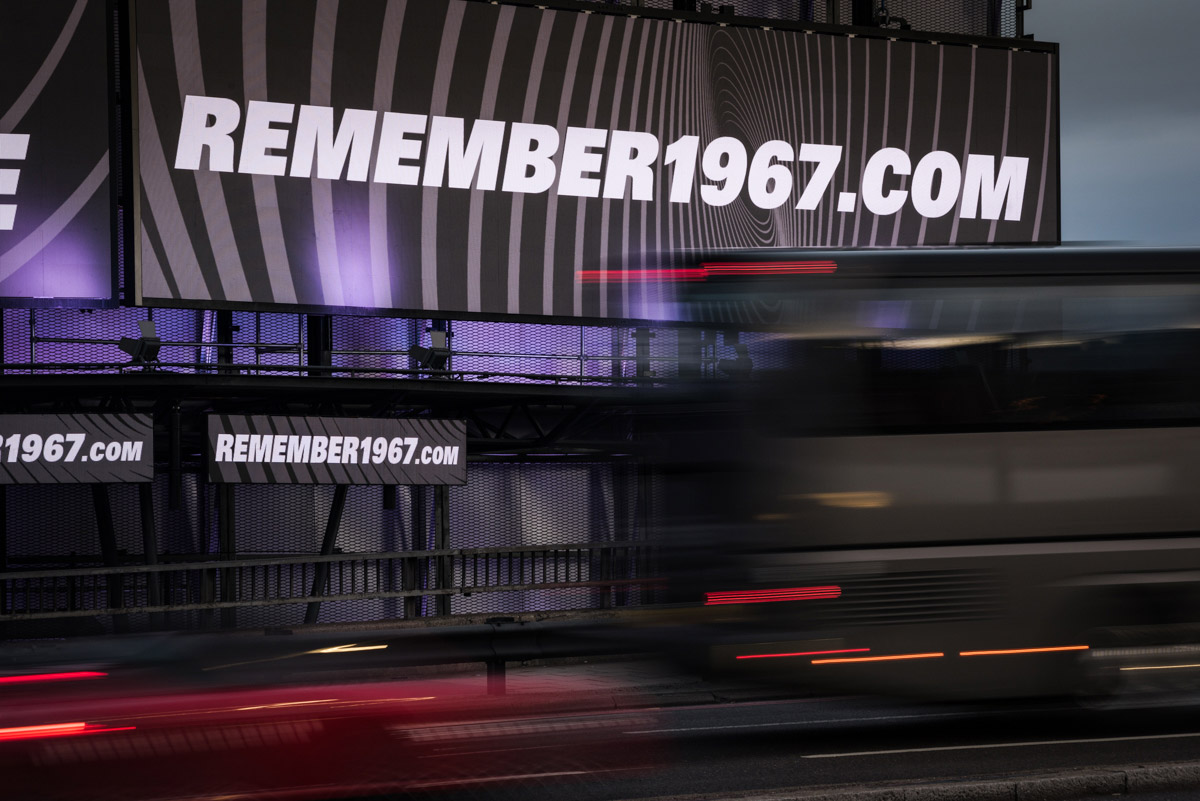
Public artwork by Martin Firrell marking the 50th anniversary of the Sexual Offences Act 1967

No subsequent reconsideration of the issue of male homosexuality in statutory law took place in England and Wales until the late 1970s. In 1979, the Home Office Policy Advisory Committee's Working Party report Age of Consent in relation to Sexual Offences recommended that the age of consent for homosexual acts should be 18. This was rejected at the time, in part due to fears that further decriminalisation would serve only to encourage younger men to experiment sexually with other men, a choice that some at the time claimed would place such an individual outside of wider society.

The law was extended to Scotland in the Criminal Justice (Scotland) Act 1980, which took effect on 1 February 1981. As a result of the 1981 European Court of Human Rights case Dudgeon v. United Kingdom, the law was extended to Northern Ireland in the Homosexual Offences (Northern Ireland) Order 1982.

In 2020, a Freedom of Information request by journalists at The Mail on Sunday found that the Royal Mint Advisory Committee had rejected plans to issue a commemorative coin to mark the 50th anniversary of the passing of the act in 2015, concluding that it would not be "commercially viable" due to a perceived "lack of appeal" for the coin amongst collectors.

=== Amendments ===
- The age of consent of 21 for homosexual males set by the 1967 Act was reduced to 18 by the Criminal Justice and Public Order Act 1994 after an attempt to equalise the age of consent with that of the heterosexual age of consent of 16 introduced as an amendment by the then Conservative MP Edwina Currie narrowly failed. This law also extended the definition of rape to include male rape; until then the latter had been prosecuted as buggery.
- In 2000, the Parliament Acts 1911 and 1949 were invoked to ensure the passage of the Sexual Offences (Amendment) Act 2000, which equalised the age of consent to 16 for both homosexual and heterosexual behaviours throughout the UK.
- The privacy restrictions of the law meant that while two men could have sex, a third person could not participate in the sex or even be present. These restrictions were held to be in breach of the European Convention on Human Rights by the European Court of Human Rights in 2000. The UK Government brought the law in England and Wales into compliance with that ruling by the Sexual Offences Act 2003, which omitted the privacy requirements relating to same-sex male sexual activity. (Sexual activity in a public lavatory was made a separate offence.)
- The Sexual Offences Act 2003, though subject to some controversy, overhauled the way sexual offences were dealt with by the police and courts, replacing provisions in the Sexual Offences Act 1956 as well as the 1967 Act, while keeping in place the non-criminalization of homosexuality and an equal age of consent. The offences of gross indecency and buggery, which were still formally in place (although superseded and rendered essentially unenforceable by other Acts) were removed from statutory law. As a result of the 2003 Act, the vast majority of the 1967 Act has been repealed.

=== Surviving section ===
The only operative section of the Act still in effect is section 6, which states that premises are to be treated for purposes of sections 33 to 35 of the Sexual Offences Act 1956 as a brothel "if people resort to it for the purpose of lewd homosexual practices in circumstances in which resort thereto for lewd heterosexual practices would have led to its being treated as a brothel for the purposes of those sections".

== See also ==
- LGBT rights in the United Kingdom
- Sexual Offences Act

== Bibliography ==
- Tatchell, P Europe in the Pink London: Gay Men's Press, 1995
- The Times in Microfilm Facsimile Periodical Publications, London The Times 1967 (available in digital form via JISC)
- Wolfenden, J (chair) The Report of the Committee on Homosexual Offences and Prostitution (cmnd 247) HMSO, 1958
- Coming out of the dark ages, Geraldine Bedell, The Observer, 24 June 2007
- Grey, Antony Quest for Justice, Sinclair-Stevenson, 1992
