= Dudgeon v United Kingdom =

European Court of Human Rights court case

Decided 22 October 1981
- Full case name: Dudgeon v United Kingdom
- Chamber: Grand Chamber
- Language of proceedings: English
- Nationality of parties: British

Dudgeon v United Kingdom (1981) is a landmark European Court of Human Rights (ECtHR) case, which held that Section 11 of the Criminal Law Amendment Act 1885, which criminalised male homosexual acts in England, Wales and Northern Ireland, breached the defendant's rights under Article 8 of the European Convention on Human Rights.

The case was significant

1. as the first successful case before the ECtHR on the criminalisation of male homosexuality;
2. as the case which led to legislation in 1982 bringing the law on male homosexuality in Northern Ireland into line with that in Scotland (since 1980) and in England and Wales (since 1967);
3. as a lead-in to Norris v. Ireland, a later case before the ECtHR argued by Mary Robinson, which challenged the continued application of the same 1885 law in the Republic of Ireland; and
4. for setting the legal precedent that ultimately resulted in the Council of Europe requiring that no member state could criminalise male or female homosexual behaviour.

== Facts ==
Jeff Dudgeon was a shipping clerk and gay activist in Belfast, Northern Ireland, when he was interrogated by the Royal Ulster Constabulary about his sexual activities. He filed a complaint with the European Commission of Human Rights in 1975, which after a hearing in 1979 declared his complaint admissible to the European Court of Human Rights. The Court hearing was in April 1981 before a full panel of 19 judges. Dudgeon was represented by barristers Lord Gifford, Terry Munyard, and solicitor Paul Crane.

== Judgment ==
On 22 October 1981, the Court agreed with the Commission that Northern Ireland's criminalisation of homosexual acts between consenting adults was a violation of Article 8 of the European Convention on Human Rights which says: "Everyone has the right to respect for his private and family life, his home and his correspondence. There shall be no interference by a public authority with the exercise of this right except such as is in accordance with the law and is necessary in a democratic society ... for the protection of health or morals". Judgment was given in Dudgeon's favour on that aspect by 15 votes to 4.

It stated the "restriction imposed on Mr. Dudgeon under Northern Ireland law, by reason of its breadth and absolute character, is, quite apart from the severity of the possible penalties provided for, disproportionate to the aims sought to be achieved." However, the ruling continued, "it was for countries to fix for themselves ... any appropriate extension of the age of consent in relation to such conduct."

The Court held by 14 votes to 5 that it was not necessary also to examine the case under Article 14 taken in conjunction with Article 8, which would otherwise have meant considering the aspect of discrimination. It stated that "once it has been held that the restriction on the applicant's right to respect for his private sexual life give rise to a breach of Article 8 by reason of its breadth and absolute character, there is no useful legal purpose to be served in determining whether he has in addition suffered discrimination as compared with other persons." Minority opinions were written on both aspects.

== Significance ==
This was the first case at the European Court of Human Rights to be decided in favour of LGBT rights. It was only the thirty-fifth case judged by the Court, and the fifth violation found against the UK. There have been upwards of ten thousand more cases judged at Strasbourg.

As a consequence of the judgment, male homosexual sex was decriminalised in Northern Ireland in October 1982. Female homosexual behaviour was never criminal anywhere in the United Kingdom.

The MPs from Northern Ireland who voted on the proposed decriminalising Order were universally opposed.

In the Article 50 settlement of 24 February 1983, no damages were awarded, the verdict being seen as sufficient reward for the hurt and pain suffered. Costs of £3,315 were awarded towards Dudgeon's legal fees but he was denied the remaining £1,290 because of a view by the Court that his then lawyers were operating on a contingency basis. Three of the five judges who voted against him on the main case and the British judge constituted a majority of the seven judges on the settlement court panel.

A freedom of information request later revealed a note from a Conservative minister from that time, saying, "Put this to one side; Strasbourg will do the needful." This implied that although sympathetic to Dudgeon's case, the UK government preferred using the European Court of Human Rights to change the law in Northern Ireland rather than intervene itself.

The same provision of the 1885 Act was still in force in the Republic of Ireland, and upheld by the Supreme Court of Ireland in 1983. Norris v. Ireland (1988) successfully challenged this in the ECtHR, with Dudgeon serving as the key precedent. This led to decriminalisation in the Republic of Ireland in 1993. It was similarly followed in Modinos v. Cyprus (1993), finding an equivalent law to be a violation.

Dudgeon v. United Kingdom was cited by Justice Anthony Kennedy in Lawrence v. Texas (2003), the US Supreme Court decision which found anti-sodomy laws in 14 remaining states to be unconstitutional.

== See also ==
- LGBT rights in Northern Ireland
- List of LGBT-related cases before international courts and quasi-judicial bodies
- Privacy law
- Laskey, Jaggard and Brown v United Kingdom
- Smith and Grady v United Kingdom
- Sutherland v United Kingdom
- 1981 in LGBT rights

== External links and related literature ==
- "Full text of Dudgeon v. the United Kingdom (1981)". European Court of Human Rights HUDOC Portal.
- Micheal T McLoughlin MA (December 1996). "Crystal or Glass?: A Review of Dudgeon v. United Kingdom on the Fifteenth Anniversary of the Decision". ELaw Journal. 3 (4). Murdoch: Murdoch University.
- A people's history of the European Court of Human Rights, Michael D Goldhaber, Rutgers University Press, New Jersey, 2007. Chapter 3 'Gay in a Time of Troubles'.
- Human Rights Advocacy Stories, Foundation Press, New York, 2009, Chapter 3 'The Stories of Dudgeon and Toonen: Personal Struggles to Legalize Sexual Identities', Mark Bromley and Kristen Walker.
- J. Dudgeon Speech to the ILGA conference in Turin, 2011
