= Labouchère Amendment =

1885 law in the UK

Section 11 of the Criminal Law Amendment Act 1885, commonly known as the Labouchère Amendment, made "gross indecency" a crime in the United Kingdom. In practice, the law was used broadly to prosecute male homosexuals where actual sodomy (meaning, in this context, anal intercourse) could not be proven. The penalty of life imprisonment for sodomy (death until 1861) was also so harsh that successful prosecutions were rare. The new law was much more enforceable. In England and Wales, section 11 was repealed and re-enacted by section 13 of the Sexual Offences Act 1956; this in turn was repealed by the Sexual Offences Act 1967, which partially decriminalised male homosexual behaviour.

Most famously, Oscar Wilde was convicted under section 11 and sentenced to two years' hard labour, and Alan Turing was convicted under it and sentenced to oestrogen injections (chemical castration) as an alternative to prison.

== Background ==
The Buggery Act 1533, during the time of Henry VIII, codified sodomy into secular law as "the detestable and abominable vice of buggery". The Offences against the Person Act 1861 specifically lowered the capital punishment for sodomy to life imprisonment, which continued until 1967. However, fellatio, masturbation, and other acts of non-penetration remained lawful. Private homosexual activity, though stigmatised and demonised, was somewhat safer during this time; the prosecution had to prove penetration had actually occurred.

In April 1870, cross-dressers Boulton and Park were arrested for wearing drag outside the Strand Theatre. They were charged with conspiracy to commit sodomy with Lord Arthur Pelham-Clinton, who died (probably of suicide) later that year and who was the third son of the Henry Pelham-Clinton, 5th Duke of Newcastle. However, since there was no actual witness of any such act nor evidence of semen on their posterior regions, the charges were dropped.

Henry Labouchère, Liberal MP for Northampton, had been a diplomat; he now was the founding editor of Truth magazine, which had its selling point in exposing corruption and degeneration. In 1882, Labouchère met Wilde in America; Wilde praised him as the "best writer in Europe", though Labouchère criticised Wilde as an "effeminate phrase maker". Sir Howard Vincent, director of criminal investigations at Scotland Yard from 1878 to 1884, called homosexual acts a modern "scourge".

The Yokel's Preceptor, a contemporary magazine, said this:

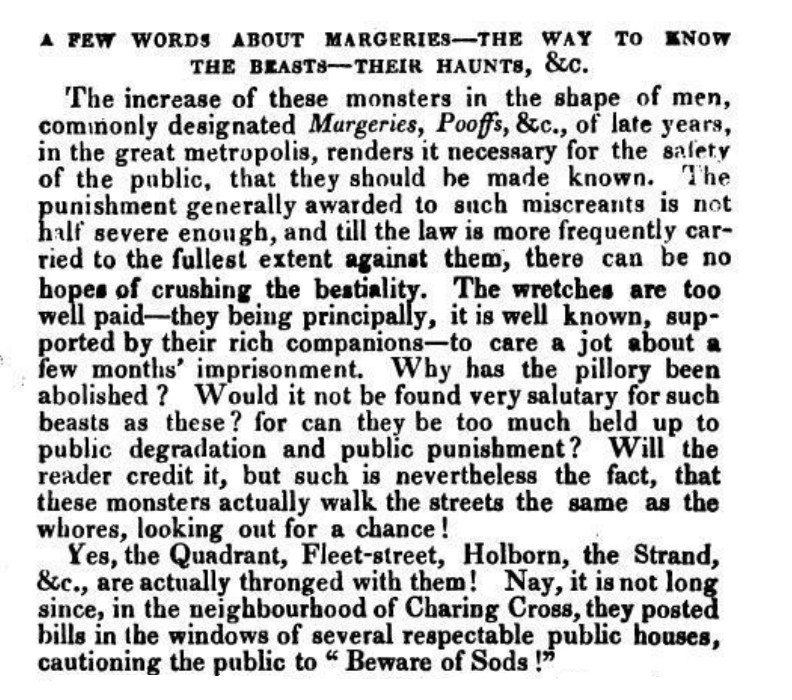

Hysteria over homosexuality was at a peak during the time, though the contemporary morality was already beginning to question the ethics of homosexual activity. Karl Heinrich Ulrichs, a German lawyer, in the 1860s produced literature in favour of love between men. Calling it Uranian love, he even considered it to be a higher form of love than common heterosexual love. Similarly, John Addington Symonds, an English poet, published A problem in Greek Ethics in 1883. It was subtitled "An Inquiry into the Phenomenon of Sexual Inversion addressed especially to medical psychologists and jurists". He argued for the Grecian pederasty, and said that the modern era could rethink its values.

== Criminal Law Amendment Bill ==
In 1881, 1884, and 1885, John Ramsay, 13th Earl of Dalhousie introduced criminal law amendment bills "for the Protection of Women and Girls [and] suppression of brothels" (as their long title stated). The bills passed in the House of Lords but the first two were rejected in the House of Commons by the Gladstone ministry. It was held that the proposed increase in the age of consent would leave men open to blackmail. The 1885 bill passed the Lords on 1 May 1885, and its future progress was uncertain. In July, Pall Mall Gazette editor W. T. Stead was imprisoned for "buying" a 13-year-old girl named Eliza Armstrong for the sum of £5. He used this as proof of the ease with which this could be done in The Maiden Tribute of Modern Babylon, a series of articles which caused a moral panic. The caretaker Salisbury ministry accepted Dalhousie's bill, which completed its second reading in the Commons on 9 July 1885. The government made amendments to the bill at committee stage. Stead wrote to Labouchère, telling of the rise in homosexuality in London and other large cities.

Labouchère proposed his amendment at the last minute, on report stage ("consideration"). Frank Harris, a contemporary, wrote that Labouchère proposed it as a wrecking amendment to make the law seem "ridiculous" and thus discredit it in its entirety; some historians agree, citing Labouchère’s habitual obstructionism and other attempts to sink this bill by the same means, while others write that his role in calling for more investigation into the Cleveland Street [male brothel] scandal places into context a sincere attempt to change the law permanently, stipulating more robust controls against male homosexuality. The amendment was rushed through and passed in the early hours of 7 August 1885, becoming section 11 of the act. When Charles Warton questioned whether Labouchère’s amendment had anything to do with the original intent of the bill (as expressed in its long title), the speaker, Arthur Peel, responded that under procedural rules any amendment was permitted by leave of the House. (In 1888 standing orders were changed to restrict the type of amendment which could be made at a bill's report stage.)

Labouchère, inspired to action by the modern question over sexual norms, pushed in the four-minute debate for strong action against "deviants". He originally wanted a seven-year minimum sentence of hard labour, but the home secretary and attorney general persuaded him to a reduction of the sentence to any term not exceeding one year with or without hard labour. The former attorney general, Sir Henry James, while supporting the amendment, objected to the leniency of the sentence, and wanted to increase the sentence to any term not exceeding two years with or without hard labour. Labouchère agreed, and the amendment was passed.

=== Law ===
Any male person who, in public or private, commits, or is a party to the commission of, or procures, or attempts to procure the commission by any male person of, any act of gross indecency with an other male person, shall be guilty of a misdemeanour, and being convicted thereof, shall be liable at the discretion of the Court to be imprisoned for any term not exceeding two years, with or without hard labour.

No definition of "gross indecency" was provided. John Addington Symonds was disgusted by section 11, arguing, amongst other things, that it would only facilitate blackmail against homosexuals. He noted that reference to being "party to the commission of" gross indecency served essentially as a conspiracy charge, allowing for a broader pool of convictions. This amendment ignored lesbian activity.

== Prominent prosecutions ==
As a result of the vagueness of the term "gross indecency", this law allowed juries, judges, and lawyers to prosecute virtually any male homosexual behaviour where it could not be proven that the defendant had specifically engaged in homosexual anal intercourse, also known as sodomy or "buggery". The sentence was relatively light compared to the penalty for that act, which remained a separate crime. Lawyers dubbed section 11 the "blackmailer's charter".

The law led to many convictions against male homosexuals and alleged homosexuals. A number committed suicide.

=== Oscar Wilde ===
Wilde had (against the advice of friends like Frank Harris and George Bernard Shaw) unsuccessfully privately prosecuted in libel the Marquess of Queensberry for writing on a calling card left at Wilde's club that he, Wilde, was "posing as a somdomite" (sodomite). The action was urged by Queensberry's son Lord Alfred Douglas, who reluctantly fled to France at the time to avoid possible arrest. Section 11 was quickly invoked to prosecute and convict Oscar Wilde in 1895. He was given the most severe sentence possible under the Act, which the judge described as "totally inadequate for a case such as this". Wilde was found guilty of gross indecency with "at least" 12 young men between 1892 and 1894 and he was sentenced to two years' hard labour. After prison, Wilde would condemn the Criminal Law Amendment Act, predicting that the battle against it would be a "road... long and red with monstrous martyrdoms." He asserted that so-called "Uranian" love was "noble—more noble than other forms".

=== Alan Turing ===
Mathematician, logician, cryptanalyst and an early computer scientist, Alan Turing was investigated for alleged violations of the provision when the police discovered a male lover at his house after Turing reported a petty theft. Instead of prison, he opted for oestrogen injection hormone "therapy" for a year, slightly feminising the body and losing sexual urges. Psychologists attribute this as a cause of his suicide. He was pardoned posthumously by Queen Elizabeth II in 2013 at the request of justice minister Chris Grayling, following a petition campaign.

== Repeal ==
In England and Wales, the section was repealed and re-enacted as section 13 of the Sexual Offences Act 1956. It was later amended by the Sexual Offences Act 1967, which decriminalised consensual homosexual acts in private by men over 21. After other amendments, the section was repealed by the Sexual Offences Act 2003.

In Scottish law, the section was repealed and re-enacted as section 7 of the Sexual Offences (Scotland) Act 1976. It was later amended by section 80 of the Criminal Justice (Scotland) Act 1980, which decriminalised consensual homosexual acts in private by men over 21. After other amendments, the section was repealed by the Crime and Punishment (Scotland) Act 1997.

In Northern Ireland law, the section was amended by The Homosexual Offences (Northern Ireland) Order 1982, which decriminalised consensual homosexual acts in private by men over 21. After other amendments, it was repealed by the Sexual Offences Act 2003.

In Republic of Ireland law, the section was repealed by the Criminal Law (Sexual Offences) Act 1993, which decriminalised consensual homosexual acts between males over 17. Sections 4 and 5 of the 1993 act created new offences committable by males, respectively called "Gross indecency with males under 17 years of age" and "gross indecency with another male person who is mentally impaired", which were repealed in 2006 and 2017, and subsumed under gender-neutral crimes of "Defilement of a child" and "Sexual act with protected person". In 2019, the Supreme Court of Ireland determined that prosecutions under the 1885 act could proceed where an incident occurred before the 1993 act came into force; the Director of Public Prosecutions committed not to prosecute unless the action would still have constituted an offence under the post-1993 laws.

== See also ==
- LGBTQ rights in the United Kingdom
- Sodomy law
