= Rape in English law =

Statutory offence in England and Wales

Rape is a statutory offence in England and Wales. The offence is created by section 1 of the Sexual Offences Act 2003, and occurs when a perpetrator "intentionally penetrates the vagina, anus or mouth of another person with his penis" without consent, and without reasonable belief that the victim consents. The maximum penalty for a guilty verdict is imprisonment for life.

This definition is notably narrower than some colloquial definitions of the word rape, some of which are covered by other offences under the same act. For example, if a victim is forcefully penetrated with an object other than a penis, this is classed as "Assault by Penetration", and if the victim is made to penetrate another, this can be prosecuted as "Causing a person to engage in sexual activity without consent".

The Sexual Offences (Scotland) Act 2009 and the Sexual Offences (Northern Ireland) Order 2008 include equivalent constructions for the offence of rape.

== Background ==
Rape is considered an indictable-only offence in England and anyone assisting in such an act can be prosecuted for the crime as an accessory. Under section 1 of the Sexual Offences Act 2003, the use of the phrase "his penis" means that a female can only commit this offence as an 'accomplice'.

=== "Rape by deception" (or "by fraud") ===
The term "rape by deception" covers cases where sexual activity was procured by deceit, and the question of when deceit is substantial enough to mitigate consent. In English law, the basis for such claims is "very narrow", as ruled by the Court of Appeal in R v Linekar [1995] 3 All ER 69 73. Cases demonstrating the law on consent as set out in the 2003 Sexual Offences Act include R v Assange (aka Assange v Swedish Prosecution Authority) (Note: R v Assange in this instance should not be confused with a 1996 Australian case by that name relating to unauthorized computer use.) (if consent was conditional on the use of the condom during intercourse, and the condition was deliberately disregarded, that was capable of amounting to rape), R(F) v DPP (the sexual act was performed in a way that broke a condition agreed previously), and R v McNally (deceit as to sex). The Sexual Offences Act 1956 contained a ground of "procuring intercourse by false pretences".

A paper on website The Student Lawyer examined the basis for fraud as grounds for negating consent. It concluded that the issues which might arise if this was a legal basis to negate consent, could be far wider than might be first appreciated. Examples given by the author included sex in the following circumstances: "Andrew is secretly having an affair but denies this to his wife... Barney exaggerates his financial success and pretends to like the same music and films as his date in order to impress her... Charlie dyes his hair and pretends to be in his mid-30s on a dating website when he is really in his 50s... Derek is unhappy in his marriage and is considering whether to leave his wife; he does not mention his misgivings..." In these examples, the sexual partner in each case would not have consented had all matters likely to be relevant to their decision been fully disclosed, and a reasonable person might be expected to realise this.

A high profile and unusual case where this issue arose, was the 2011 UK undercover policing relationships scandal in which police officers obtained sex by deceiving as to their identity, as part of their duties. Crown Prosecutors declined to prosecute on the basis that legally, the actions would not constitute rape as consent to the act itself was informed and the grounds for rape by deceit as to identity was extremely limited.

== Sentence ==
A person guilty of rape is liable on conviction to imprisonment for life or for any shorter term.

For further information, see the Crown Prosecution Service prosecution guidance.

=== Relevant cases ===
- R v Billam (1986) 8 Cr App R (S) 48
- R v Millberry [2002] EWCA Crim 2891, [2003] Crim LR 207, [2003] 2 Cr App R (S) 31, [2003] 2 All ER 939, [2003] 2 Cr App R (S) 31, [2003] 1 WLR 546, [2003] 1 Cr App R 25.
- R v Corran and others [2005] 2 Cr App R (S) 73, [2005] 2 Cr App R (S)73, [2005] EWCA Crim 192
- R v Abokar Ahmed Ismail [2005] 2 Cr App R (S) 88
- A-Gs Reference No. 86 of 2005 (Christopher James S.) 2 Cr App R(S)
- In R v Millberry, the Court of Appeal held that "there are, broadly, three dimensions to consider in assessing the gravity of an individual offence of rape. The first is the degree of harm to the victim; the second is the level of culpability of the offender; and the third is the level of risk posed by the offender to society." Subsequently, the court held in Attorney General's Reference (Nos. 91, 119, 120 of 2002) that these three dimensions can be applied to sentencing for other categories of sexual offences.
- In September 2019, serial rapist Jason Lawrance appealed against one of his convictions, in which he had told a victim he had had a vasectomy, prior to sex, but admitted afterwards that this was untrue. The conviction for rape by deception, and the appeal (at this time ongoing), are believed to be the first of their kind in the UK.

== History ==
Rape was an offence under the common law of England and was classified as a felony.

A statute, the Abduction of Women Act 1487 (3 Hen. 7. c. 2), entitled 'An Acte agaynst taking awaye of Women agaynst theire Wills' made abduction and forced marriage (or rape) of property-owning women or heiresses for the purposes of financial gain a felony in England. Those who aided and abetted the abduction or imprisonment were also guilty of a felony in England.

The common law defined rape as "the carnal knowledge of a woman forcibly and against her will". The common law defined carnal knowledge as the penetration of the female sex organ by the male sex organ (it covered all other acts under the crime of sodomy). The crime of rape was unique in the respect that it focused on the victim's state of mind and actions in addition to that of the defendant. The victim was required to prove a continued state of physical resistance, and consent was conclusively presumed when a man had intercourse with his wife. "One of the most oft-quoted passages in our jurisprudence" on the subject of rape is by Lord Chief Justice Sir Matthew Hale from the 17th century, "rape ... is an accusation easily to be made and hard to be proved, and harder to be defended by the party accused, tho never so innocent." Lord Hale is also the origin of the remark, "In a rape case it is the victim, not the defendant, who is on trial." However, as noted by Sir William Blackstone in his Commentaries on the Laws of England, by 1769 the common law had recognized that even a prostitute could suffer rape if she had not consented to the act.

Section 16 of the Offences against the Person Act 1828 read as follows:

And be it enacted, That every Person convicted of the Crime of Rape shall suffer Death as a Felon

Here, "death as a felon" means death by hanging and confiscation of the lands and goods, which were pronounced against felons, as opposed to the quartering which befell traitors. "Thus it was assumed that the definition of rape was so well understood and established by the common law of England that a statutory definition was unnecessary." The death penalty for rape was abolished by section 3 of the Substitution of Punishments for Death Act 1841 which substituted transportation for life. Transportation was abolished by the Penal Servitude Act 1857, which substituted penal servitude for life. These sections were replaced by section 48 of the Offences against the Person Act 1861. Penal servitude was abolished by the Criminal Justice Act 1948, which substituted imprisonment for life. These sections were replaced by sections 1(1) and 37(3) of, and paragraph 1(a) of the Second Schedule to the Sexual Offences Act 1956.

In January 1982, the Government accepted an amendment to the Criminal Justice Bill the effect of which, if enacted, would be to compel judges to sentence men convicted of rape to imprisonment. This followed a case earlier that month in which John Allen, 33, businessman and convicted of raping a 17-year-old hitchhiker, had been fined £2,000 by Judge Bernard Richard, who alleged the victim's "contributory negligence".

The final paragraph of section 4 of the Criminal Law Amendment Act 1885 provided that it was rape for a man to have carnal knowledge of a married woman by impersonating her husband. This provision was replaced by section 1(2) of the Sexual Offences Act 1956.

Rape ceased to be a felony on 1 January 1968 as a result of the abolition of the distinction between felony and misdemeanour by the Criminal Law Act 1967.

The definition of rape at common law was discussed in DPP v Morgan.

A statutory definition of "rape" was provided by section 1 of the Sexual Offences (Amendment) Act 1976. This was intended to give effect to the Report of the Advisory Group on the Law of Rape (Cmnd 6352) and to the opinions expressed by the House of Lords in DPP v Morgan. It read:

- (1) For the purposes of section 1 of the Sexual Offences Act 1956 (which relates to rape) a man commits rape if—
  - (a) he has unlawful sexual intercourse with a woman who at the time of the intercourse does not consent to it; and
  - (b) at that time he knows that she does not consent to the intercourse or he is reckless as to whether she consents to it;
  and references to rape in other enactments (including the following provisions of this Act) shall be construed accordingly.

In R v R it was held that the word "unlawful" in that section did not exclude marital rape (see Marital rape#England and Wales).

Section 1 of the Sexual Offences Act 1956 was substituted on 3 November 1994 by section 142 of the Criminal Justice and Public Order Act 1994, providing a new and broader definition:

- (1) It is an offence for a man to rape a woman or another man.
- (2) A man commits rape if –
  - (a) he has sexual intercourse with a person (whether vaginal or anal) who at the time of the intercourse does not consent to it; and
  - (b) at the time he knows that the person does not consent to the intercourse or is reckless as to whether that person consents to it.
- (3) A man also commits rape if he induces a married woman to have sexual intercourse with him by impersonating her husband.
- (4) Subsection (2) applies for the purposes of any enactment.

The effect of this was to make what is termed male rape amount to the offence rape instead of (where it took place in private and both parties were over 18 – s.12(1A) as substituted) or in addition to (in all other cases) the offence of buggery. The first person to be convicted under the wider definition (for attempted rape) was Andrew Richards on 9 June 1995. The word "unlawful" did not appear in this section because of R v R.

That section was replaced on 1 May 2004 by section 1 of the Sexual Offences Act 2003, providing a still broader definition. References to vaginal or anal sexual intercourse were replaced by references to penile penetration of the vagina, anus or mouth. It also altered the requirements of the defence of mistaken belief in consent so that one's belief must be now both genuine and reasonable. Presumptions against that belief being reasonably held also now apply when violence is used or feared, the complainant is unconscious, unlawfully detained, drugged, or is by reason of disability unable to communicate a lack of consent. The change in this belief test from the old subjective test (what the defendant thought, reasonably or unreasonably) to an objective test was the subject of some debate, as it permits a man to be convicted of rape if he thought a person was consenting, were the circumstances thought by a jury to be unreasonable.

=== Capacity ===
At common law a boy under the age of fourteen years could not commit rape as a principal offender as he was irrefutably presumed to be incapable of sexual intercourse. This rule was abolished by section 1 of the Sexual Offences Act 1993. A boy under the age of fourteen years could commit rape as an accomplice.

It was never decided whether a boy under fourteen could be convicted of attempting to commit rape as a principal, rather than an accomplice, if he attempted to have sexual intercourse or actually succeeded in doing so. The reported dicta did not agree on this point.

A woman could not commit rape as a principal offender, by the nature of the offence, but she could commit rape as an accomplice.

=== Attempt ===
Section 37(3) of, and paragraph 1(b) of the Second Schedule to, the Sexual Offences Act 1956 provided that a person guilty of an attempt to commit rape was liable to imprisonment for a term not exceeding seven years. Attempted rape became a statutory offence under section 1(1) of the Criminal Attempts Act 1981. But the maximum penalty was not affected by this. The maximum penalty for attempted rape was increased to imprisonment for life by sections 3(1) and (2) of the Sexual Offences Act 1985.

In the Sexual Offences (Amendment) Act 1976, the expression "a rape offence" included:

- attempted rape
- aiding, abetting, counselling and procuring attempted rape

=== Compensation ===
Special provision was made in relation to rape by sections 109(3)(a) and 111(6) of the Criminal Justice Act 1988.

== See also ==
- Rape
- Laws regarding rape
- Rape statistics
- Sexual offences in the United Kingdom
- Crime in the United Kingdom

Key cases related to deceit and consent in the context of rape charges in the UK:

- UK undercover policing relationships scandal – police officers obtained sex by deceiving as to their identity, as part of their duties
- R v Linekar [1995] 3 All ER 69 73 – case in which Court of Appeal gave rulings on cases of "rape by fraud" in English law
