= Sexual Offences Act =

Stock short title used for legislation

Sexual Offences Act (with its variations) is a stock short title used for legislation in the United Kingdom and former British colonies and territories such as Antigua and Barbuda, Crown dependencies, Kenya, Lesotho, Republic of Ireland, Sierra Leone, South Africa and Trinidad and Tobago relating to sexual offences (including both substantive and procedural provisions).

The Bill for an Act with this short title may have been known as a Sexual Offences Bill during its passage through Parliament.

Sexual Offences Acts may be a generic name for legislation bearing that short title. It is a term of art.

== List ==
=== United Kingdom ===
==== England and Wales ====
The Sexual Offences Act 1956 (4 & 5 Eliz. 2. c. 69)
The Indecency with Children Act 1960 (8 & 9 Eliz. 2. c. 33)
The Sexual Offences Act 1967 (c. 60)
The Sexual Offences (Amendment) Act 1976 (c. 82)
The Sexual Offences Act 1985 (c. 44)
The Sexual Offences (Amendment) Act 1992 (c. 34)
The Sexual Offences Act 1993 (c. 30)
The Sexual Offences (Conspiracy and Incitement) Act 1996 (c. 29)
The Sexual Offences (Protected Material) Act 1997 (c. 39)
The Sexual Offences (Amendment) Act 2000 (c. 44)
The Sexual Offences Act 2003 (c. 42)

The Sexual Offences Acts

The Sexual Offences Acts 1956 and 1967 is the collective title of the Sexual Offences Act 1957 and the Sexual Offences Act 1967.
The Sexual Offences Acts 1956 to 1976 is the collective title of the Sexual Offences Acts 1956 and 1967 and the Sexual Offences (Amendment) Act 1976.
The Sexual Offences Acts 1956 to 1992 is the collective title of the Sexual Offences Acts 1956 to 1976 and the Sexual Offences (Amendment) Act 1992.

==== Scotland ====
The Sexual Offences (Scotland) Act 1976 (c. 67)
The Sexual Offences (Procedure and Evidence) (Scotland) Act 2002 (asp 9)
The Protection of Children and Prevention of Sexual Offences (Scotland) Act 2005 (asp 9)
The Sexual Offences (Scotland) Act 2009 (asp 9)

==== Northern Ireland ====
A number of Orders in Council with this title have been passed. The change in nomenclature is due to the demise of the Parliament of Northern Ireland and the imposition of direct rule. These orders are considered to be primary legislation.

The Sexual Offences (Northern Ireland) Order 1978 (SI 1978/460 (N.I. 5))
The Sexual Offences (Northern Ireland) Order 2008 (SI 2008/1769 (N.I. 2))

=== Antigua and Barbuda ===
- The Sexual Offences Act 1995

=== Barbados ===
- Sexual Offences Act 1993
- Sexual Offences (Amendment) Act 2016

=== Crown dependencies ===
==== Bailiwick of Guernsey ====
- Sexual Offences (Bailiwick of Guernsey) Law, 1983
- The Sexual Offences (Amendment) (Guernsey) Law, 2000
- The Sexual Offences (Bailiwick of Guernsey) (Amendment) Law, 2011

==== Bailiwick of Jersey ====
- Sexual Offences (Jersey) Law 1990
- Sexual Offences (Jersey) Law 2018
- Sex Offenders (Jersey) Law 2010

==== Isle of Man ====
- Sexual Offences Act 1992
- Sexual Offences (Amendment) Act 2006

=== Dominica ===
- Sexual Offences Act 1887
- Sexual Offences (Amendment) Act 1992
- Sexual Offences Act 1996
- Sexual Offences (Amendment) Act 2016

=== Guyana ===
- Sexual Offences Act 2010

=== Jamaica ===
- Sexual Offences Act 2009

=== Kenya ===
The Sexual Offences Act 2006

=== Republic of Ireland ===
- Criminal Law (Sexual Offences) Act, 1993
- Sexual Offences (Jurisdiction) Act, 1996
- Sex Offenders Act, 2001
- Criminal Law (Sexual Offences) Act 2006
- Criminal Law (Sexual Offences) Act 2017

=== Lesotho ===
- Sexual Offences Act 2003

=== Maldives ===
- Sexual Offences Act 2014

=== Malaysia ===
- Sexual Offences Against Children Act 2017

=== Sierra Leone ===
- Sexual Offences Act 2012

=== South Africa ===
- The Sexual Offences Act, 1957 (now mostly repealed)
- The Criminal Law (Sexual Offences and Related Matters) Amendment Act, 2007

=== Tanzania ===
- Sexual Offences (Special Provisions) Act 1998

=== Trinidad and Tobago ===
- Sexual Offences Act, 1986
- Sexual Offences (Amendment) Act, 2000

== See also ==
- Sexual offences in the United Kingdom

List of short titles
