= R v R =

English marital rape trial

R v R (Note: R v R is pronounced "Crown against R". The first R is short for Regina (Latin for 'Queen'), denoting a criminal case brought by the Crown (when the monarch is male, it is short for Rex 'King' instead). The second R is an anonymised reference to the defendant.)
- Court: House of Lords
- Decided: 23 October 1991
- Citation: (1992) 94 Cr App R 216, [1991] 3 WLR 767, [1991] UKHL 12, [1992] Fam Law 108, (1991) 155 JP 989, [1992] 1 FLR 217, [1992] 1 AC 599, [1992] AC 599, [1991] 4 All ER 481, (1991) 155 JPN 752, [1992] Crim LR 207

Case history
- Prior action: None

Court membership
- Judges sitting: Lord Keith, Lord Brandon, Lord Griffiths, Lord Ackner and Lord Lowry

Case opinions
- Decision by: Lord Keith
- Concurrence: Lord Brandon, Lord Griffiths, Lord Ackner, Lord Lowry

Keywords
- marital rape

R v R [1991] UKHL 12 is a House of Lords judgement in which R was convicted of attempting to rape his wife but appealed his conviction on the grounds of a marital rape exemption whereby R claimed a husband cannot be convicted of raping his wife as his wife had given consent to sexual intercourse through the contract of marriage which she could not withdraw. The court considered the common law defence of marital rape and declared that it did not exist in English law.

== History ==
R married his wife in 1985; however, the marriage became strained. In 1989, at the wife's parents' house, while her parents were out, R broke in and attempted to force her to have sexual intercourse with him against her will while also strangling her. The police arrested R and charged him with attempted rape and assault occasioning actual bodily harm. The jury at Leicester Crown Court found him guilty on both counts. R appealed the case with regards to his attempted rape conviction to the House of Lords based on the exemption of marital rape.

=== Legal history ===
The exemption of marital rape came about in English common law from Sir Matthew Hale's History of the Pleas of the Crown where he declared "the husband cannot be guilty of a rape committed by himself upon his lawful wife, for by their mutual matrimonial consent and contract the wife hath given herself up to her husband, consent which she cannot retract". This was held as a binding precedent up until R v R, and it was distinguished in R v Kowalski that the marital defence only applied to the crime of rape (which was then defined as vaginal sex only) and not to acts such as fellatio. Often judges would interpret the law as being that while a defendant could not be guilty of rape on their wives, they would instead be guilty of assault on the grounds they could not legally use force to engage in intercourse.

== Judgement ==
Lord Keith of Kinkel gave the per curiam decision. In it, he considered a previous case in Scottish law where in S v HM Advocate it was held that there was no marital rape exemption in Scottish law, even if the married couple was cohabiting. In that case, Lord Emslie questioned if the exemption was an accurate representation of life in modern Scotland. Lord Keith stated in the judgement that there was no reason why this couldn't apply in English law. He stated that following the Matrimonial Causes Acts, the definition of marriage had moved from Hale's time from where the wife was subservient to her husband into a contract of equals.

The House of Lords also considered the meaning of the word 'unlawful' in the phrase "unlawful sexual intercourse" in the definition of rape in the Sexual Offences (Amendment) Act 1976. The defence submitted that at the time of enactment 'unlawful' in this context meant 'illicit', that is, either outside marriage or within one of the established exceptions to the marital rape exemption (such as the granting of a decree nisi in divorce proceedings). The court rejected this and determined instead that the word 'unlawful' was surplusage as the alternative interpretation was offensive both to the ordinary meaning of the word as "contrary to law" (as there was no law prohibiting consensual sex outside marriage) and to modern society. With regard to the marital rape exemption, Lord Keith declared that marital rape exemption was a "common law fiction" and ruled that "in modern times the supposed marital exemption in rape forms no part of the law of England." Lord Brandon of Oakbrook, Lord Griffiths, Lord Ackner and Lord Lowry all unanimously agreed with Lord Keith's reasoning. As such R's appeal was dismissed and his conviction upheld.

== Impact ==
The case was reviewed by the European Court of Human Rights under article 7 of the European Convention on Human Rights in SW and CR v UK on the grounds that because the law was wrong, then SW and CR argued they had been punished without breaking any law in a violation of article 7. However, the Court rejected this appeal on the grounds that R v R was a natural foreseeable evolution of law and that even if the common law marital rape exemption existed or their victims not been their wives, then the appellants would still have been guilty of rape under the Sexual Offences (Amendment) Act 1976.

The judgement in R v R was supported by the Law Commission and was later confirmed in statute law by an amendment to the Sexual Offences Act in the Criminal Justice and Public Order Act 1994, which provided a statutory definition of rape (now replaced with section 1 of the Sexual Offences Act 2003).
