= Carnal knowledge =

Legal and archaic euphemism for sexual intercourse

Carnal knowledge is an archaic or legal euphemism for sexual intercourse. In modern statutes, the term "sexual penetration" is widely used, though with various definitions.

The term derives from carnal, meaning "of the flesh", and the Biblical usage of the verb know/knew, a euphemism for sexual conduct.

== Biblical source ==
One example of this usage is in the first part of the Bible, the Book of Genesis, which describes how Adam and Eve conceived their first child:

And Adam knew Eve his wife; and she conceived, and bore Cain, and said, I have gotten a man with [the help of] Jehovah.

— Genesis 4:1

Also in Genesis is Lot's plea to the people of Sodom to whom he offered his virgin daughters, in place of his guests:

And they called unto Lot, and said unto him, Where are the men that came in to thee this night? bring them out unto us, that we may know them.

And Lot went out unto them to the door, and shut the door after him. And he said, I pray you, my brethren, do not so wickedly. Behold now, I have two daughters that have not known man; let me, I pray you, bring them out unto you, and do ye to them as is good in your eyes: only unto these men do nothing, forasmuch as they are come under the shadow of my roof.

— Genesis 19:5–8

Some translations translate the Hebrew expression more explicitly, undoing the euphemism for clarity to modern readers; for example, the New International Version translates the Hebrew phrase literally meaning "to know" as "to make love to" in Genesis 4:1, and as "to have sex with" in Genesis 19.

== Legal usage ==
In criminal law, the term has had different meanings at different times and in different jurisdictions. While commonly a mere euphemism for sexual intercourse (not necessarily unlawful), different jurisdictions have defined carnal knowledge (as well as sexual intercourse) as a specific sex act such as contact between a penis and vagina, some laws elaborating this to include even "slight penile penetration of female sex organs". The definition sometimes includes a set of sex acts that include sodomy, while some statutes specifically exclude such acts. Some laws do not define the term, and leave it to the courts to give it meaning, which also allows them to take into account changing community standards.

Carnal knowledge has also sometimes meant sexual intercourse outside of marriage, and sometimes refers to sex with someone under the age of consent. The phrase is often found in this sense in modern legal usage, being equivalent to statutory rape in some jurisdictions, as the term rape implies lack of consent.

=== England and Wales ===
Section 18 of the Offences against the Person Act 1828 reads as follows:

What shall be sufficient Proof of carnal Knowledge in the Four preceding Cases. XVIII. 'And Whereas upon Trials for the Crimes of Buggery and of Rape, and of carnally abusing Girls under the respective Ages hereinbefore mentioned, Offenders frequently escape by reason of the Difficulty of the Proof which has been required of the Completion of those several Crimes;' for Remedy thereof be it enacted, That it shall not be necessary, in any of those Cases, to prove the actual Emission of Seed to constitute carnal Knowledge, but that the carnal Knowledge shall be deemed complete upon Proof of Penetration only.

The crimes of carnally abusing girls referred to were those created by section 17 of the Act.

In cases decided under this section it was held that the slightest penetration was sufficient.

This section was replaced by section 63 of the Offences against the Person Act 1861. The term was not used in the Sexual Offences Act 1956, which replaced it, where it appeared, with the term sexual intercourse, in all the provisions consolidated by that Act. The current Sexual Offences Act 2003 goes further and does not refer to "sexual intercourse", instead describing the physical act explicitly in terms of specific body parts where relevant, and referring to "sexual activity" more generally in other cases.
