= CPIA =

CPIA may refer to:

- Chemical Propulsion Information Analysis Center
- Country Policy and Institutional Assessment, which is the rating of countries against a set of 16 criteria grouped in four clusters: economic management, structural policies, policies for social inclusion and equity, and public sector management and institutions.
- Criminal Procedure and Investigations Act 1996, a UK Act of Parliament.
- The Centre for Public Interest Audit, an independent body founded in 2024, working on behalf those working on public interest entity (PIE) audits in the UK.
