= Sexual intercourse in English law =

Legal term of art in England and Wales

The expression "sexual intercourse" has been used as a legal term of art in England and Wales.

== Definition ==
From its enactment to its repeal on the 1 May 2004, section 44 of the Sexual Offences Act 1956 read:

Where, on the trial of any offence under this Act, it is necessary to prove sexual intercourse (whether natural or unnatural), it shall not be necessary to prove the completion of the intercourse by the emission of seed, but the intercourse shall be deemed complete upon proof of penetration only.

This replaced section 63 of the Offences against the Person Act 1861 with almost identical wording, only replacing "carnal knowledge" with "sexual intercourse".

The 1956 Act was replaced with the Sexual Offences Act 2003 which generally does not refer to sexual intercourse, preferring more precise definitions. In particular rape and assault by penetration require 'penetration' (by specified things), whereas most other sexual offences require some degree of 'sexual' touching or other specified activity. The 1956 Act remains in force in relation to acts committed before the 2003 Act came into force.

=== "Unnatural" ===
This expression referred to buggery (including both buggery with a person and buggery with an animal).

=== "Penetration" ===
According to cases decided on the meaning of the statutory definition of 'carnal knowledge' under the Offences against the Person Act 1828, which was in identical terms to this definition, the slightest penetration was sufficient. Archbold said that it "submitted" that this continued to be the law under the new enactment.

See also R v Hughes (1841) 9 C & P 752, (1841) 2 Mood CC 190 and R v Lines (1844) 1 Car & Kir 393.

=== "Continuing act" ===
See Kaitamaki v R [1985] AC 147, [1984] 3 WLR 137, [1984] 2 All ER 435, 79 Cr App R 251, [1984] Crim LR 564, PC (decided under equivalent legislation in New Zealand).

=== Other definitions ===
Section 7(2) of the Sexual Offences (Amendment) Act 1976 contained the following words: "In this Act ... references to sexual intercourse shall be construed in accordance with section 44 of the Sexual Offences Act 1956 so far as it relates to natural intercourse (under which such intercourse is deemed complete on proof of penetration only)". The Act made provision, in relation to rape and related offences, for England and Wales, and for courts-martial elsewhere.

From 3 November 1994 to 1 May 2004, section 1(2)(a) of the Sexual Offences Act 1956 (as substituted by section 142 of the Criminal Justice and Public Order Act 1994) referred to "sexual intercourse with a person (whether vaginal or anal)". This section created the offence of rape in England and Wales.

=== "Unlawful sexual intercourse" ===
In R v Chapman, the court considered section 19 of the Sexual Offences Act 1956 and held that sexual intercourse was "unlawful" if it was extra-marital.

=== "Consortium" ===
Sexual intercourse is an incident of consortium.

=== Human rights ===
The European Court of Human Rights has found that Article 12 of the European Convention on Human Rights (recognising the rights to marry and to found a family) does not confer on prisoners a right to conjugal relations whilst in prison.
