= Sexual Offences (Amendment) Act 1992 =

Act of the Parliament of the United Kingdom

Sexual Offences (Amendment) Act 1992 (Note: Section 8(1).)
- Act of Parliament
- Parliament of the United Kingdom
- Long title: An Act to make provision with respect to anonymity in connection with allegations of, and criminal proceedings relating to, certain sexual offences.
- Citation: 1992 c. 34
- Territorial extent: England and Wales; Scotland; Northern Ireland; (Note: Section 8(6).)

Dates
- Royal assent: 16 March 1992
- Commencement: 1 August 1992 (Note: Section 8(3). The Sexual Offences (Amendment) Act 1992 (Commencement) Order 1992.)
Other legislation
Amends	Sexual Offences Act
Amended by	Criminal Justice and Public Order Act 1994; Youth Justice and Criminal Evidence Act 1999; International Criminal Court Act 2001; Armed Forces Act 2001; Sexual Offences Act 2003; Criminal Justice (Northern Ireland) Order 2003; Courts Act 2003 (Consequential Provisions) Order 2005; Armed Forces Act 2006; Serious Crime Act 2007; Sexual Offences (Northern Ireland) Order 2008; Modern Slavery Act 2015; Human Trafficking and Exploitation (Criminal Justice and Support for Victims) Act (Northern Ireland) 2015; Justice (Sexual Offences and Trafficking Victims) Act (Northern Ireland) 2022; Online Safety Act 2023

Status: Amended

Text of statute as originally enacted

Revised text of statute as amended

Text of the Sexual Offences (Amendment) Act 1992 as in force today (including any amendments) within the United Kingdom, from legislation.gov.uk.

The Sexual Offences (Amendment) Act 1992 (c. 34) is an act of the Parliament of the United Kingdom.

The act provides for the lifelong anonymity of the victims and alleged victims of sexual offences, by prohibiting the publishing or broadcast of their identity, or information that might make their identity apparent, including their address or picture.

== Contents ==
Section 1 of the act establishes the prohibition. Section 2 sets out the sexual offences covered, and has been amended since, including due to the wholesale redefinition of sexual offences in England and Wales by the Sexual Offences Act 2003. Section 3 allows judges to waive anonymity on application from defendants and appellants if this is needed to help witnesses come forward or to avoid prejudicing their case, or if it is in the public interest. This provision is very rarely used, though some victims waive their own anonymity to talk publicly about their cases.

The act was passed to address perceived deficiencies in an earlier and weaker form of identity protection for victims in cases of rape only, which had been established by the Sexual Offences (Amendment) Act 1976. Convictions under the act, generally resulting in fines, occur with some frequency, especially in high-profile cases where members of the public less familiar with the law than the press or broadcast media name accusers on social media, though charges are also brought against professional journalists. In some cases, such as where abuse has taken place within a family, the media may be unable to report the name of the offender, because this combined with details of the offence may indirectly reveal the identity of the victim.

== Application to Scotland ==
While the 1992 Act does apply in Scotland, prohibiting Scottish publishers from identifying complainants in sexual offence prosecutions which take place in England, Wales or Northern Ireland, it does not apply to sexual offence prosecutions which take in Scottish courts. While there is a media convention that Scottish complainers are not identified, doing so is not currently prohibited by law unless an order is made imposing reporting restrictions under section 11 of the Contempt of Court Act 1981. In September 2025, the Scottish Parliament passed the Victims, Witnesses and Criminal Justice Reform (Scotland) Act 2025, which will introduce automatic statutory anonymity for victims in Scottish sexual offence cases for the first time.
