= Sexual Offences (Amendment) Act 1976 =

Act of the Parliament of the United Kingdom

Sexual Offences (Amendment) Act 1976 (Note: Section 7(1).)
- Act of Parliament
- Parliament of the United Kingdom
- Long title: An Act to amend the law relating to rape.
- Citation: 1976 c. 82
- Territorial extent: England and Wales, except so far as the act related to courts-martial and the Courts-Martial Appeal Court (including such a publication or broadcast in Northern Ireland as was mentioned in section 4(1) as adapted by section 5(l)(b) and section 6(1) as adapted by section 6(4)(b)) (Note: Section 7(6).)

Dates
- Royal assent: 22 November 1976
- Commencement: 22 December 1976 (except sections 5(1)(b) and 6(4)(b)); 22 April 1978 (sections 5(1)(b) and 6(4)(b)); (Note: Section 7(4). The Sexual Offences (Amendment) Act 1976 (Commencement) Order 1978.)
Other legislation
| Amends | Sexual Offences Act 1956 |
| Amended by | Prosecution of Offences (Custody Time Limits) Regulations 1987; Criminal Justice Act 1988; Youth Justice and Criminal Evidence Act 1999; Sexual Offences Act 2003; Serious Crime Act 2007 |

Status: Amended

Text of statute as originally enacted

Revised text of statute as amended

Text of the Sexual Offences (Amendment) Act 1976 as in force today (including any amendments) within the United Kingdom, from legislation.gov.uk.

The Sexual Offences (Amendment) Act 1976 (c. 82) is an act of the Parliament of the United Kingdom. It made provision in relation to rape and related offences. Except for subsections (1) and (2) and (4) and (6) of section 7, the whole act is repealed. Section 7(2) now provides the definition of the expression "a rape offence" in relation to court martial proceedings. The other remaining provisions are purely supplemental.

In England and Wales and Northern Ireland, from 1 September 2001 section 57 of the International Criminal Court Act 2001 (as read with sections 56, 63(2) and 78 of that act) provides that any reference in this act to a specific substantive offence includes an offence under section 51 involving conduct constituting that offence, and, as if any reference in those provisions to a specific ancillary offence includes

- that ancillary offence in relation to an offence under section 51 involving conduct constituting the substantive offence in question,
- and an offence under section 52 involving conduct constituting that ancillary offence in relation to an act to which that section applies involving conduct constituting the substantive offence in question.

== Section 1 - Meaning of "rape" etc ==
Subsection (1) provided a definition of the word "rape". It was repealed by section 168(3) of, and Schedule 11 to, the Criminal Justice and Public Order Act 1994.

Subsection (2) was amended by section 168(2) of, and Schedule 10 to, that Act. It was repealed by paragraph 20(2) of Schedule 6 to, and Schedule 7 to, the Sexual Offences Act 2003.

== Section 2 - Restrictions on evidence at trials for rape etc ==
This section was amended by section 168(2) of, and paragraphs 35(1) and (3) of Schedule 10 to, the Criminal Justice and Public Order Act 1994.

This section was repealed on 4 December 2000 by section 67(3) of, and Schedule 6 to, the Youth Justice and Criminal Evidence Act 1999 (as read with paragraphs 3(3) and 5(2) of Schedule 7).

== Section 3 - Application of section 2 to committal proceedings, courts–martial and summary trials ==
This section was amended by section 47 of, and paragraph 23 of Schedule 1 to, the Criminal Procedure and Investigations Act 1996. The amended text applied only in relation to alleged offences into which no criminal investigation had begun before 1 April 1997.

This section was repealed on 4 December 2000 by section 67(3) of, and Schedule 6 to, the Youth Justice and Criminal Evidence Act 1999 (as read with paragraphs 3(3) and 5(2) of Schedule 7).

== Section 4 – Anonymity of complainants in rape etc cases ==
This section was amended by Schedule 5 to the Cable and Broadcasting Act 1984, section 158 of the Criminal Justice Act 1988, Schedule 20 to the Broadcasting Act 1990, and sections 168(1) and (2) of, and paragraph 13 of Schedule 9 to, and paragraph 36 of Schedule 10 to the Criminal Justice and Public Order Act 1994.

It was repealed in part by Schedule 16 to the Criminal Justice Act 1988, and Schedule 21 to the Broadcasting Act 1990.

This section was repealed by section 67(3) of, and Schedule 6 to, the Youth Justice and Criminal Evidence Act 1999.

Broader provisions for the anonymity of complainants in sexual offence cases were established by the Sexual Offences (Amendment) Act 1992.

=== Sections 4(1) and (1A) ===
Subsections (1) and (1A) were substituted for subsection (1) by section 158 of, and paragraph 16 of schedule 8 to, the Criminal Justice Act 1988.

The words "or man" in both places and the words "or him" were inserted in subsection (1)(a) on 3 November 1994 by section 168(2) of, and paragraph 36(2)(a)(i)and (iii) of Schedule 10 to the Criminal Justice and Public Order Act 1994.

The words "name nor the address of the woman or man", "that person’s lifetime" and "identify that person" in subsection (1)(a) were substituted on 3 November 1994 by section 168(2) of, and paragraph 36(2)(a)(ii), (iv) and (v) of Schedule 10 to the Criminal Justice and Public Order Act 1994.

The words "included in a relevant programme for reception" in subsection (1)(a)(ii) and (b)(ii) and the words "inclusion in a relevant programme" in subsection (1)(b) were substituted by section 203(1) of, and paragraph 26(1)(a) of Schedule 20 to, the Broadcasting Act 1990.

The words "or man" were inserted in subsection (1)(b) on 3 November 1994 by section 168(2) of, and paragraph 36(2)(b)(i) of Schedule 10 to the Criminal Justice and Public Order Act 1994.

The words "that person’s lifetime" in subsection 1(b) were substituted on 3 November 1994 by section 168(2) of, and paragraph 36(2)(b)(ii) of Schedule 10 to the Criminal Justice and Public Order Act 1994.

=== Section 4(3) ===
If at a trial ... the judge is satisfied that the effect of subsection (1) of this section is to impose a substantial and unreasonable restriction upon the reporting of proceedings at the trial and that it is in the public interest to remove or relax the restriction, he shall direct that that subsection shall not apply to such matter . . . as is specified in the direction; but a direction shall not be given in pursuance of this subsection by reason only of [the outcome of] the trial.

The words "before the Crown Court at which a person is charged with a rape offence" and "relating to the complainant" were repealed by sections 158(4)(a) and 170 of, and paragraph 16 of schedule 8 to, and schedule 16 to, the Criminal Justice Act 1988.

The words "the outcome of" were substituted for the words "an acquittal of a defendant" by section 158(4)(b) of, and paragraph 16 of Schedule 8 to, the Criminal Justice Act 1988.

=== Section 4(5) ===
This subsection created a summary offence of contravening subsection (1). See further Brown v DPP, (1998) 162 JP 333, (1998) The Times 26 March 1998, DC.

The words "or included in a relevant programme" were substituted by section 203(1) of, and paragraph 26(1)(b) of Schedule 20 to, the Broadcasting Act 1990.

Paragraph (d) was inserted after paragraph (c) by paragraph 34(2) of Schedule 5 to the Cable and Broadcasting Act 1984.

A new paragraph (c) was substituted for paragraphs (c) and (d) by section 203(1) of, and paragraph 26(1)(b) of Schedule 20 to, the Broadcasting Act 1990. (The said paragraph 34(2) of the Act of 1984 being repealed by Schedule 2 to the said Act of 1990).

The reference to level 5 on the standard scale was substituted for England and Wales by sections 38 and 46 of the Criminal Justice Act 1982, and for Scotland by the sections 289F and 289G of the Criminal Procedure (Scotland) Act 1975, and for Northern Ireland by, articles 5 and 6 of S.I. 1984/703 (N.I. 3).

=== Section 4(5A) ===
This subsection was inserted by section 158(3) of, and paragraph 16 of Schedule 8 to, the Criminal Justice Act 1988.

The words of "any matter or the inclusion of any matter in a relevant programme" and the words "or programme" were substituted in this subsection by section 203(1) of, and paragraph 26(1)(c) of Schedule 20 to, the Broadcasting Act 1990.

The words "or man" were inserted in this subsection on 3 November 1994 by section 168(2) of, and paragraph 36(3) of Schedule 10 to, the Criminal Justice and Public Order Act 1994.

=== Section 4(5B) ===
This subsection was inserted by section 158(3) of, and paragraph 16 of schedule 8 to, the Criminal Justice Act 1988.

The words "peace or comfort of the woman or man" were substituted in this subsection on 3 November 1994 by section 168(2) of, and paragraph 36(4) of schedule 10 to, the Criminal Justice and Public Order Act 1994.

=== Section 4(6) ===
The words "transfers proceedings against him for trial for" in subsection (6)(c) were prospectively substituted by section 44(3) of, and paragraph 27 of schedule 4 to, the Criminal Justice and Public Order Act 1994. That Schedule was retrospectively repealed by sections 44(2) and (6) and 80 of, and paragraph 1 of Schedule 5 to, the Criminal Procedure and Investigations Act 1996.

The definition of "a broadcast" was repealed by sections 203(1) and (3) of, and paragraph 26(1)(d) of schedule 20 to, and Schedule 21 to, the Broadcasting Act 1990.

The definition of "cable programme" was inserted by section 57(1) of, and paragraph 34(4) of schedule 5 to, the Cable and Broadcasting Act 1984. It was repealed by sections 203(1) and (3) of, and paragraph 26(1)(d) of schedule 20 to, and schedule 21 to, the Broadcasting Act 1990.

The words "or man" in the definition of "complainant" were inserted on 3 November 1994 by section 168(2) of, and paragraph 36(5) of Schedule 10 to, the Criminal Justice and Public Order Act 1994.

The definition of "relevant programme" was inserted by section 203(1) of, and paragraph 26(1)(d) of Schedule 20 to, the Broadcasting Act 1990.

=== Section 4(6A) ===
This subsection was inserted on 3 February 1995 by section 168(1) of, and paragraph 13 of Schedule 9 to, the Criminal Justice and Public Order Act 1994.

=== Section 4(7) ===
Subsection (7)(a) was repealed by section 170 of, and paragraph 16 of Schedule 8 to, and Schedule 16 to, the Criminal Justice Act 1988.

The words "or upon matter included in a relevant programme" were substituted in subsection (7)(b) by section 203(1) of, and paragraph 26(1)(e) of Schedule 20 to, the Broadcasting Act 1990.

== Section 5 – Provisions supplementary to section 4 ==
This section was repealed by section 67(3) of, and Schedule 6 to, the Youth Justice and Criminal Evidence Act 1999.

=== Section 5(1) ===
This subsection modified section 4 in relation to persons charged with a rape offence in pursuance of any provision of the Naval Discipline Act 1957, the Army Act 1955 or the Air Force Act 1955.

The word "all" was substituted for the word "both" in subsection (1)(b) by section 170 of, and paragraph 16 of Schedule 8 to, and paragraph 53(2) of Schedule 15 to, the Criminal Justice Act 1988.

=== Section 5(5) ===
Proceedings for an offence under subsection (5) of the preceding section (including such an offence which is alleged to have been committed by virtue of the preceding subsection) shall not be instituted except by or with the consent of the Attorney General or, if the offence is alleged to have been committed in Northern Ireland, of the Attorney General for Northern Ireland; and where a person is charged with such an offence it shall be a defence to prove that at the time of the alleged offence he was not aware, and neither suspected nor had reason to suspect, that the publication [or programme in question was of, or (as the case may be) included,] such matter as is mentioned in subsection (1) of that section.

For the words "or broadcast" in this subsection, there was substituted the words "broadcast or cable programme" by section 57(1) of, and paragraph 34(5) of Schedule 5 to Cable and Broadcasting Act 1984. That Act was repealed on 1 December 1990 by section 203(3) of, and Schedule 21 to, the Broadcasting Act 1990. For the words "broadcast or cable programme in question was of" there was substituted the words "or programme in question was of, or (as the case may be) included," by section 203(1) of, and paragraph 26(2) of Schedule 20 to, the said Act of 1990.

This section was explained by section 12 of the Criminal Jurisdiction Act 1975 (repealed for England and Wales by part II of schedule 2 to the Prosecution of Offences Act 1979). The said section 12 provided that this subsection did not prevent the arrest without warrant, or the issue or execution of a warrant for the arrest, of a person for any offence, or the remand in custody or on bail of a person charged with any offence, and that this subsection was subject to any enactment concerning the apprehension or detention of children or young persons.

=== Section 5(6) ===
The words from the beginning to "and" in the second place where it occurred were by section 170(2) of, and paragraph 16 of Schedule 8 to, and Schedule 16 to, the Criminal Justice Act 1988.

Before:

In section 31(1) of the Criminal Appeal Act 1968 (which provides that certain powers of the Court of Appeal may be exercised by a single judge) after the word "1973" there shall be inserted the words "and the power to give directions under section 4(4) of the Sexual Offences (Amendment) Act 1976"; and in section 36(1) of the Courts–Martial (Appeals) Act 1968 (which provides that certain powers of the Courts–Martial Appeal Court may be exercised by a single judge) after paragraph (g) there shall be inserted the words "and the power to give directions under section 4(4) of the Sexual Offences (Amendment) Act 1976 as adapted by section 5(1)(d) of that Act".

After:

... in section 36(1) of the Courts–Martial (Appeals) Act 1968 (which provides that certain powers of the Courts–Martial Appeal Court may be exercised by a single judge) after paragraph (g) there shall be inserted the words "and the power to give directions under section 4(4) of the Sexual Offences (Amendment) Act 1976 as adapted by section 5(1)(d) of that Act".

== Section 6 – Anonymity of defendants in rape etc cases ==
This section was repealed by sections 158(5) and 170 of, and paragraph 16 of Schedule 8 to, and Schedule 16 to, the Criminal Justice Act 1988.

== Section 7 – Citation, interpretation, commencement and extent ==
=== Section 7(2) ===
This subsection defined the expressions "a rape offence" and "sexual intercourse" for the Act.

As originally enacted, this subsection defined "a rape offence" to mean any of the following: rape, attempted rape, aiding, abetting, counselling and procuring rape or attempted rape, and incitement to rape. The definition was amended by sections 158(1) and (6) of, and paragraph 16 of Schedule 8 to, the Criminal Justice Act 1988, which added conspiracy to rape and burglary with intent to rape. This subsection was substituted by section 139 of, and paragraphs 20(1) and (3)(a) of Schedule 6 to the Sexual Offences Act 2003. This provided a new definition of "a rape offence" as meaning any of the following:

(i) an offence under section 1 of the Sexual Offences Act 2003 (rape)
(ii) an offence under section 2 of that Act (assault by penetration)
(iii) an offence under section 4 of that Act (causing a person to engage in sexual activity without consent) where the activity caused involved penetration within section 4(4)(a) to (d)
(iv) an offence under section 5 of that Act (rape of a child under 13)
(v) an offence under section 6 of that Act (assault of a child under 13 by penetration)
(vi) an offence under section 8 of that Act (causing or inciting a child under 13 to engage in sexual activity) where an activity involving penetration within section 8(3)(a) to (d) was caused
(vii) an offence under section 30 of that Act (sexual activity with a person with a mental disorder impeding choice) where the touching involved penetration within section 30(3)(a) to (d)
(viii) an offence under section 31 of that Act (causing or inciting a person, with a mental disorder impeding choice, to engage in sexual activity) where an activity involving penetration within subsection 31(3)(a) to (d) was caused
(ix) an attempt, conspiracy or incitement to commit an offence within any of paragraphs (i) to (vii);
(x) aiding, abetting, counselling or procuring the commission of such an offence or an attempt to commit such an offence

The reference to the common law offence of incitement (or to conduct amounting to) that offence in subsection (2)(ix) now has effect as a reference to (or to conduct amounting to) the offences under Part 2 of the Serious Crime Act 2007. Paragraph 4 of Part I of Schedule 6 to that Act also says that this subsection now provides the meaning of "rape offence" in relation to court martial proceedings.

Part 2 of the 2007 act relates to encouraging or assisting crime and the offences in question are:

- Intentionally encouraging or assisting an offence, contrary to section 44
- Encouraging or assisting an offence believing it will be committed, contrary to section 45
- Encouraging or assisting offences believing one or more will be committed, contrary to section 46

The definition of "sexual intercourse" was repealed on 3 November 1994 by sections 168(2) and (3) of, and paragraph 35(4)(a) of Schedule 10 to, and Schedule 11 to, the Criminal Justice and Public Order Act 1994.

The words "section 46 of the Sexual Offences Act 1956" were substituted for the words "and section 46 of that Act" on 3 November 1994 by section 168(2) of, and paragraph 35(4)(b) of Schedule 10 to, the Criminal Justice and Public Order Act 1994. This was consequential on the repeal of the definition of sexual intercourse which left those words with no point of reference.

=== Section 7(3) ===
This subsection was repealed sections 139 and 140 of, and paragraph 20(3)(b) of Schedule 6 to, and Schedule 7 to, the Sexual Offences Act 2003.

=== Section 7(4) ===
As enacted this subsection read:

This Act shall come into force on the expiration of the period of one month beginning with the date on which it is passed, except that sections 5(1)(b) and 6(4)(b) shall come into force on such day as the Secretary of State may appoint by order made by statutory instrument.

The words "and 6(4)(b)" were repealed by section 170 of, and paragraph 16 of Schedule 8 to, and Schedule 16 to, Criminal Justice Act 1988.

The words from "except that" onwards were repealed by section 67(3) of, and Schedule 6 to, the Youth Justice and Criminal Evidence Act 1999.

The power conferred on the Secretary of State to bring sections 5(1)(b) and 6(4)(b) was exercised on 22 April 1978 by article 2 of the Sexual Offences (Amendment) Act 1976 (Commencement) Order 1978 (SI 1978/485). And section 5(1)(b) was brought into force on that date.

"The period of one month beginning with the date on which it is passed"

The word "month" means a calendar month. The date on which the Act was "passed" is the date on which it received royal assent. That date was 22 November 1976. The period of one month includes the date on which the Act was passed. The effect of this is that the Act came into force on 22 December 1976, except sections 5(1)(b) and 6(4)(b).

=== Section 7(5) ===
As enacted this subsection read:

Sections 2 and 3 of this Act shall not have effect in relation to a trial or inquiry which begins before the expiration of that period and sections 4 and 6 of this Act shall not have effect in relation to an accusation alleging a rape offence which is made before the expiration of that period.

The words "and 6" were repealed by section 170 of, and paragraph 16 of Schedule 8 to, and Schedule 16 to, the Criminal Justice Act 1988. This was consequential on the repeal of section 6 by that act.

This subsection was repealed by section 67(3) of, and Schedule 6 to, the Youth Justice and Criminal Evidence Act 1999. This was consequential on the repeal of sections 2 to 4 by that Act.

=== Section 7(6) ===
This subsection reads:

This Act, except so far as it relates to courts–martial and the Courts–Martial Appeal Court, shall not extend to Scotland [or Northern Ireland].

The words "and to such a publication or broadcast or inclusion in a cable programme in Northern Ireland as is mentioned in section 4(1) as adapted by section 5(1)(b)" were substituted for the words "(including such a publication or broadcast in Northern Ireland as is mentioned in section 4(1) as adapted by section 5(l)(b) and section 6(1) as adapted by section 6(4)(b))" by section 170 of, and paragraph 16 of Schedule 8 to, and paragraph 53(3) of Schedule 15 to, and Schedule 16 to, the Criminal Justice Act 1988.

The words "in, or such an inclusion of matter in a relevant programme for reception in," were substituted for the words "broadcast or inclusion in a cable programme" by section 203(1) of, and paragraph 26(3) of Schedule 20 to, the Broadcasting Act 1990.

The words "or Northern Ireland" were substituted for the words "and this Act, except so far as it relates to courts–martial and the Courts–Martial Appeal Court [and to such a publication or [in, or such an inclusion of matter in a relevant programme for reception in,] in Northern Ireland as is mentioned in section 4(1) as adapted by section 5(1)(b)], shall not extend to Northern Ireland" by section 48 of, and paragraphs 4(1) and (3) of Schedule 2 to, the Youth Justice and Criminal Evidence Act 1999.

== See also ==
Sexual Offences Act

== Bibliography ==
- Halsbury's Statutes
- Archbold Criminal Pleading, Evidence and Practice, 1999, chapter 20, passim
