= DPP v Morgan =

1975 UK criminal law case

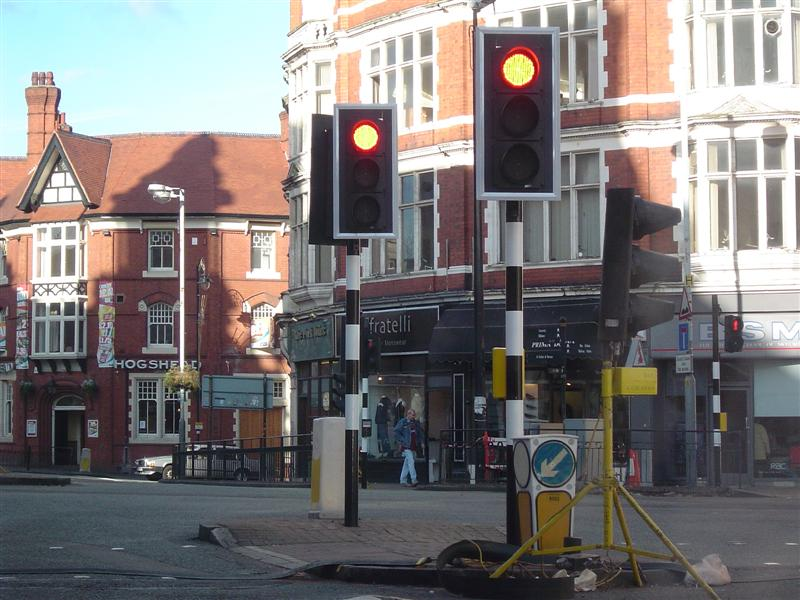
- Wolverhampton, where the defendants were drinking prior to the gang rape of Morgan's wife.
- Court: House of Lords
- Full case name: DPP v Morgan, DPP v McDonald, DPP v McLarty, DPP v Parker
- Decided: 30 April 1975
- Citations: [1975] UKHL 3; [1976] AC 182; [1975] 2 WLR 913; [1975] 2 All ER 347; 61 Cr App R 136; [1975] Crim LR 717
- Transcript: BAILII

Court membership
- Judges sitting: Lord Cross of Chelsea; Lord Hailsham of St. Marylebone; Lord Simon of Glaisdale; Lord Edmund-Davies; Lord Fraser of Tullybelton

Laws applied
- Abrogated by
- Sexual Offences Act 2003 (in relation to the offence of rape)

Keywords
- Rape, mistaken belief

Director of Public Prosecutions v Morgan was a decision of the House of Lords, handed down on 30 April 1975, which decided that an honest belief by a man that a woman with whom he was engaged with sexual intercourse was consenting was a defence to rape, irrespective of whether that belief was based on reasonable grounds.

This case was superseded by the Sexual Offences Act 2003 which came into force on 1 May 2004. That Act redefined rape to exclude only cases where belief of consent is reasonable.

== Case history ==
William Anthony Morgan was a 37-year-old non-commissioned officer in the RAF. On the night of 15 August 1973 he was drinking in Wolverhampton with three junior colleagues. He invited the three of them to his house, ostensibly in order to have sexual intercourse with his wife, Daphne. The friends later claimed that Morgan told them that his wife was "kinky", and would feign protest (Morgan himself denied this). At the time the wife was sleeping separately from her husband, and was sleeping with her 11-year-old son in his bed when the defendants came into the house. The four men forcibly overcame the wife's resistance, dragged her from her son's bed, and each one had forcible intercourse without her consent whilst the others held her. She initially screamed for her son and his older brother to call the police, but in her evidence, she said the men clamped her nose and mouth with their hands to choke her until she submitted. After the attack, Morgan himself had sexual intercourse with his wife. She then went directly to Cosford hospital where she reported to staff that she had been raped.

The men were charged with rape, and Morgan was charged with aiding and abetting the others to commit rape. He was not charged with rape because at the time it was believed that a husband had an absolute defence in law by virtue of being married to the victim.

== Trial ==
At trial the three men pleaded that they had honestly believed that Mrs Morgan had consented to sexual intercourse.

They were tried at Stafford Crown Court at a trial presided over by Mr Justice Kenneth Jones.

The trial judge directed the jury that the defendants would not be guilty of rape if they honestly believed that the woman was consenting and that belief in consent was reasonably held. On 24 January 1974 the jury convicted all four and they appealed.

== House of Lords ==
The House of Lords held that an honest but mistaken belief that the victim was consenting would provide a complete defence; the basis for that belief did not need to be objectively reasonable so long as the jury were satisfied that the defendant honestly believed it.

While the defendants won their legal argument, their convictions were nonetheless upheld. The judges found that no reasonable jury would have ever acquitted the defendants even had they been correctly directed by the trial judge as to the law, and so applying "the proviso" they upheld the convictions.

== Criticism ==
Notwithstanding the conviction of the defendants, the decision has attracted widespread criticism. Dolly Alexander has pointed out that in most other areas of English criminal law, mistaken belief must be held on a reasonable basis to found a defence. The feminist legal scholar Jennifer Temkin referred to the decision in DPP v Morgan as a "rapist's charter".

== Subsequent developments ==
In 2004 the law was changed pursuant to the Sexual Offences Act 2003 such that belief on the part of the defendant that the victim consented must be "reasonable".

The Morgan subjective honest belief test survives in some Commonwealth Caribbean jurisdictions.

The rule also survives in the Republic of Ireland, despite recommendations for reform; such has not been prioritised legislatively.
