= JANAF =

JANAF may refer to:

- Jadranski naftovod, an oil company and an oil pipeline in Croatia
- JANAF Shopping Center, a shopping center in Norfolk, Virginia
- Joint Army-Navy-Air Force, predecessor of the Joint Army-Navy-NASA-Air Force (JANNAF), an exchange platform for research between U.S. military institutions
