= Sexual Offences Act 1993 =

Act of the Parliament of the United Kingdom

Sexual Offences Act 1993 (Note: Section 2(1).)
- Act of Parliament
- Parliament of the United Kingdom
- Long title: An Act to abolish the presumption of criminal law that a boy under the age of fourteen is incapable of sexual intercourse.
- Citation: 1993 c. 30
- Territorial extent: England and Wales (Note: Section 2(4).)

Dates
- Royal assent: 20 July 1993
- Commencement: 20 September 1993 (Note: Section 2(2).)

Status: Current legislation

Text of statute as originally enacted

Revised text of statute as amended

Text of the Sexual Offences Act 1993 as in force today (including any amendments) within the United Kingdom, from legislation.gov.uk.

The Sexual Offences Act 1993 (c. 30) is an act of the Parliament of the United Kingdom that abolished the presumption that a boy under the age of fourteen is incapable of sexual intercourse. Under the Sexual Offences Act 2003, if a boy under the age of fourteen intentionally penetrates a woman's vagina with his penis without her consent, he is guilty of rape. Prior to the passage of the Sexual Offences Act 1993, and under the former Sexual Offences Act 1956 (4 & 5 Eliz. 2. c. 69), the boy would have been presumed physically incapable of penetrating the woman's vagina with his penis, and could not have been considered guilty of rape.

== Provisions ==
Section 1 of the act abolished the presumption of criminal law that a boy under the age of fourteen is incapable of sexual intercourse, whether natural or unnatural.

Section 2 of the act provides the short title and brought the act into force at the end of the period of two months beginning with the day on which it was passed. It does not apply to acts done before its commencement, and it extends to England and Wales only.

== See also ==
- Sexual Offences Act
