= List of Scottish statutory instruments, 2000 =

This is a complete list of Scottish statutory instruments in 2000.

== 1-100 ==
- Seeds (Fees) (Scotland) Regulations 2000 (S.S.I. 2000/1)
- Sea Fishing (Enforcement of Community Control Measures) (Scotland) Order 2000 (S.S.I. 2000/7)
- Potatoes Originating in Egypt (Amendment) (Scotland) Regulations 2000 (S.S.I. 2000/8)
- Public Finance and Accountability (Scotland) Act 2000 (Commencement) Order 2000 (S.S.I. 2000/10)
- Public Finance and Accountability (Scotland) Act 2000 (Transitional, Transitory and Saving Provisions) (No. 1) Order 2000 (S.S.I. 2000/11)
- Food Protection (Emergency Prohibitions) (Amnesic Shellfish Poisoning) (West Coast) Partial Revocation (Scotland) Order 2000 (S.S.I. 2000/13)
- Food (Animal Products from Belgium) (Emergency Control) (Scotland) Order 2000 (S.S.I. 2000/15)
- Animal Feedingstuffs from Belgium (Control) (Scotland) Regulations 2000 (S.S.I. 2000/16)
- Food Protection (Emergency Prohibitions) (Amnesic Shellfish Poisoning) (West Coast) Partial Revocation (No. 2) (Scotland) Order 2000 (S.S.I. 2000/17)
- Food Protection (Emergency Prohibitions) (Amnesic Shellfish Poisoning) (Orkney) Revocation (Scotland) Order 2000 (S.S.I. 2000/18)
- Food Protection (Emergency Prohibitions) (Amnesic Shellfish Poisoning) (East Coast) (No. 3) Revocation (Scotland) Order 2000 (S.S.I. 2000/19)
- Sea Fishing (Enforcement of Community Satellite Monitoring Measures) (Scotland) Order 2000 (S.S.I. 2000/20)
- Food Protection (Emergency Prohibitions) (Amnesic Shellfish Poisoning) (West Coast) Partial Revocation (No. 3) (Scotland) Order 2000 (S.S.I. 2000/21)
- Pesticides (Maximum Residue Levels in Crops, Food and Feeding Stuffs) (Scotland) Regulations 2000 (S.S.I. 2000/22)
- National Health Service (Vocational Training for General Medical Practice) (Scotland) Amendment Regulations 2000 (S.S.I. 2000/23)
- Food Protection (Emergency Prohibitions) (Amnesic Shellfish Poisoning) (West Coast) Partial Revocation (No. 4) (Scotland) Order 2000 (S.S.I. 2000/24)
- Sea Fishing (Enforcement of Measures for the Recovery of the Stock of Irish Sea Cod) (Scotland) Order 2000 (S.S.I. 2000/26)
- National Health Service (General Medical Services) (Scotland) Amendment Regulations 2000 (S.S.I. 2000/28)
- Act of Sederunt (Messengers-at-Arms and Sheriff Officers Rules) (Amendment) 2000 (S.S.I. 2000/30)
- Scrabster (Inner Harbour Development) Harbour Revision Order 2000 (S.S.I. 2000/32)
- Housing Revenue Account General Fund Contribution Limits (Scotland) Order 2000 (S.S.I. 2000/33)
- Sea Fishing (Enforcement of Community Quota and Third Country Fishing Measures) (Scotland) Order 2000 (S.S.I. 2000/34)
- Food (Peanuts from Egypt) (Emergency Control) (Scotland) Order 2000 (S.S.I. 2000/35)
- Food Protection (Emergency Prohibitions) (Amnesic Shellfish Poisoning) (West Coast) Partial Revocation (No. 5) (Scotland) Order 2000 (S.S.I. 2000/36)
- Health Act 1999 (Commencement No. 7) (Scotland) Order 2000 (S.S.I. 2000/38)
- Non-Domestic Rate (Scotland) Order 2000 (S.S.I. 2000/39)
- Local Government Finance (Scotland) Order 2000 (S.S.I. 2000/40)
- National Health Service (Dental Charges) (Scotland) AmendmentRegulations 2000 (S.S.I. 2000/44)
- National Health Service (Optical Charges and Payments) (Scotland)Amendment Regulations 2000 (S.S.I. 2000/45)
- Public Finance and Accountability (Scotland) Act 2000 (Transitional, Transitory and Saving Provisions) (No. 2) Order 2000 (S.S.I. 2000/46)
- Health Technology Board for Scotland Order 2000 (S.S.I. 2000/47)
- Commissioner for Local Administration in Scotland (Expenses) Regulations 2000 (S.S.I. 2000/48)
- Charities (Exemption from Accounting Requirements) (Scotland) Amendment Regulations 2000 (S.S.I. 2000/49)
- National Health Service (Charges for Drugs and Appliances) (Scotland) Amendment Regulations 2000 (S.S.I. 2000/50)
- Commissioner for Local Administration in Scotland (Designation) Order 2000 (S.S.I. 2000/51)
- Dairy Produce Quotas Amendment (Scotland) Regulations 2000 (S.S.I. 2000/52)
- Sea Fishing (Enforcement of Community Conservation Measures) (Scotland) Order 2000 (S.S.I. 2000/53)
- National Health Service (Clinical Negligence and Other Risks Indemnity Scheme) (Scotland) Regulations 2000 (S.S.I. 2000/54)
- Non-Domestic Rating (Unoccupied Property) (Scotland) Amendment Regulations 2000 (S.S.I. 2000/55)
- Valuation for Rating (Decapitalisation Rate) (Scotland) Amendment Regulations 2000 (S.S.I. 2000/56)
- Non-Domestic Rating (Rural Areas and Rateable Value Limits) (Scotland) Amendment Order 2000 (S.S.I. 2000/57)
- Valuation for Rating (Plant and Machinery) (Scotland) Regulations 2000 (S.S.I. 2000/58)
- Disabled Persons (Badges for Motor Vehicles) (Scotland) Regulations 2000 (S.S.I. 2000/59)
- Local Authorities' Traffic Orders (Exemptions for Disabled Persons) (Scotland) Regulations 2000 (S.S.I. 2000/60)
- Meat (Hygiene and Inspection) (Charges) Amendment (Scotland) Regulations 2000 (S.S.I. 2000/61)
- Food Standards Act 1999 (Transitional and Consequential Provisions and Savings) (Scotland) Regulations 2000 (S.S.I. 2000/62)
- Act of Adjournal (Criminal Procedure Rules Amendment) (Miscellaneous) 2000 (S.S.I. 2000/65)
- Act of Sederunt (Rules of the Court of Session Amendment) (Miscellaneous) 2000 (S.S.I. 2000/66)
- Registered Establishments (Fees) (Scotland) Order 2000 (S.S.I. 2000/67)
- Census (Scotland) Order 2000 (S.S.I. 2000/68)
- Scotland Act 1998 (Transitory and Transitional Provisions) (Appropriations) Amendment (Scotland) Order 2000 69)
- Police Grant (Scotland) Order 2000 (S.S.I. 2000/73)
- Local Government Pension Scheme (Management and Investment of Funds) (Scotland) Amendment Regulations 2000 (S.S.I. 2000/74)
- Food Protection (Emergency Prohibitions) (Amnesic Shellfish Poisoning) (West Coast) Partial Revocation (No. 6) (Scotland) Order 2000 (S.S.I. 2000/75)
- Valuation Timetable (Scotland) Amendment Order 2000 (S.S.I. 2000/76)
- Local Government (Discretionary Payments and Injury Benefits) (Scotland) Amendment Regulations 2000 (S.S.I. 2000/77)
- National Lottery etc. Act 1993 (Amendment of Section 23) (Scotland) Order 2000 (S.S.I. 2000/78)
- National Health Service (Travelling Expenses and Remission of Charges) (Scotland) Amendment Regulations 2000 (S.S.I. 2000/79)
- National Assistance (Sums for Personal Requirements) (Scotland) Regulations 2000 (S.S.I. 2000/80)
- Crab Claws (Prohibition of Landing) Revocation (Scotland) Order 2000 (S.S.I. 2000/81)
- Undersized Whiting (Revocation) (Scotland) Order 2000 (S.S.I. 2000/82)
- Genetically Modified and Novel Foods (Labelling) (Scotland) Regulations 2000 (S.S.I. 2000/83)
- BG Transco plc (Rateable Values) (Scotland) Order 2000 (S.S.I. 2000/85)
- Electricity Generators (Rateable Values) (Scotland) Order 2000 (S.S.I. 2000/86)
- Electricity Generators (Aluminium) (Rateable Values) (Scotland) Order 2000 (S.S.I. 2000/87)
- Electricity Lands (Rateable Values) (Scotland) Order 2000 (S.S.I. 2000/88)
- Train Operating Companies (Rateable Values) (Scotland) Order 2000 (S.S.I. 2000/89)
- Water Undertakings (Rateable Values) (Scotland) Order 2000 (S.S.I. 2000/90)
- Railtrack plc (Rateable Values) (Scotland) Order 2000 (S.S.I. 2000/91)
- Non-Domestic Rates (Levying) (Scotland) Regulations 2000 (S.S.I. 2000/92)
- Food Safety (General Food Hygiene) (Butchers' Shops) Amendment (Scotland) Regulations 2000 (S.S.I. 2000/93)
- Environmental Protection (Disposal of Polychlorinated Biphenyls and other Dangerous Substances) (Scotland) Regulations 2000 (S.S.I. 2000/95)
- Designation of Nitrate Vulnerable Zones (Scotland) Regulations 2000 (S.S.I. 2000/96)
- Air Quality (Scotland) Regulations 2000 (S.S.I. 2000/97)
- Housing Support Grant (Scotland) Order 2000 (S.S.I. 2000/98)
- Radioactive Substances (Basic Safety Standards) (Scotland) Regulations 2000 (S.S.I. 2000/100)

== 101-200 ==
- Road Traffic Reduction Act 1997 (Commencement) (Scotland) Order 2000 (S.S.I. 2000/101)
- Census (Scotland) Regulations 2000 (S.S.I. 2000/102)
- Civil Legal Aid (Financial Conditions) (Scotland) Regulations 2000 (S.S.I. 2000/107)
- Advice and Assistance (Financial Conditions) (Scotland) Regulations 2000 (S.S.I. 2000/108)
- Advice and Assistance (Assistance by Way of Representation) (Scotland) Amendment Regulations 2000 (S.S.I. 2000/109)
- Repayment of Student Loans (Scotland) Regulations 2000 (S.S.I. 2000/110)
- Welfare Reform and Pensions Act 1999 (Scotland) (Commencement No.6) Order 2000 (S.S.I. 2000/111)
- Divorce etc. (Pensions) (Scotland) Regulations 2000 (S.S.I. 2000/112)
- National Health Service Trusts (Originating Capital) (Scotland)Order 2000 (S.S.I. 2000/113)
- Food Protection (Emergency Prohibitions) (Amnesic Shellfish Poisoning) (Orkney) (No. 2) (Scotland) Revocation Order 2000 (S.S.I. 2000/118)
- Right to Purchase (Application Form) (Scotland) Order 2000 (S.S.I. 2000/120)
- European Communities (Lawyer's Practice) (Scotland) Regulations 2000 (S.S.I. 2000/121)
- Food Protection (Emergency Prohibitions) (Amnesic Shellfish Poisoning) (West Coast) (Scotland) Partial Revocation (No. 7) Order 2000 (S.S.I. 2000/125)
- Food Protection (Emergency Prohibitions) (Amnesic Shellfish Poisoning) (West Coast) (Scotland) Partial Revocation (No. 8) Order 2000 (S.S.I. 2000/127)
- Smoke Control Areas (Authorised Fuels) (Amendment) (Scotland) Regulations 2000 (S.S.I. 2000/129)
- Foods for Special Medical Purposes (Scotland) Regulations 2000 (S.S.I. 2000/130)
- Colours in Food (Amendment) (Scotland) Regulations 2000 (S.S.I. 2000/131)
- Food Protection (Emergency Prohibitions) (Oil and Chemical Pollution of Fish) (No. 2) Order 1993 Revocation (Scotland) Order 2000 (S.S.I. 2000/132)
- Food Protection (Emergency Prohibitions) (Amnesic Shellfish Poisoning) (West Coast) (Scotland) Partial Revocation (No. 9) Order 2000 (S.S.I. 2000/137)
- Act of Sederunt (Rules of the Court of Session Amendment No. 2) (Fees of Shorthand Writers) 2000 (S.S.I. 2000/143)
- Act of Sederunt (Rules of the Court of Session Amendment No. 3) (Appeals from the Competition Commission) 2000 (S.S.I. 2000/144)
- Act of Sederunt (Fees of Shorthand Writers in the Sheriff Court) (Amendment) 2000 (S.S.I. 2000/145)
- Food Protection (Emergency Prohibitions) (Amnesic Shellfish Poisoning) (West Coast) (Scotland) Partial Revocation (No. 10) Order 2000 (S.S.I. 2000/146)
- Act of Sederunt (Summary Applications, Statutory Applications and Appeals etc. Rules) Amendment 2000 (S.S.I. 2000/148)
- Children (Protection at Work) (Scotland) Regulations 2000 (S.S.I. 2000/149)
- Town and Country Planning (Fees for Applications and Deemed Applications) (Scotland) Amendment Regulations 2000 (S.S.I. 2000/150)
- Food Protection (Emergency Prohibitions) (Amnesic Shellfish Poisoning) (North Coast) (Scotland) Revocation Order 2000 (S.S.I. 2000/156)
- Food Protection (Emergency Prohibitions) (Amnesic Shellfish Poisoning) (West Coast) (Scotland) Revocation Order 2000 (S.S.I. 2000/157)
- Animal Feedingstuffs from Belgium (Control) (Scotland) Revocation Regulations 2000 (S.S.I. 2000/158)
- Food (Animal Products from Belgium) (Emergency Control) (Scotland) Revocation Order 2000 (S.S.I. 2000/159)
- Council Tax (Administration and Enforcement) (Scotland) Amendment Regulations 2000 (S.S.I. 2000/166)
- Transport of Animals (Cleansing and Disinfection) (Scotland) Regulations 2000 (S.S.I. 2000/167)
- National Health Service (Clinical Negligence and Other Risks Indemnity Scheme) (Scotland) Amendment Regulations 2000 (S.S.I. 2000/168)
- Sulphur Content of Liquid Fuels (Scotland) Regulations 2000 (S.S.I. 2000/169)
- Disabled Persons (Badges for Motor Vehicles) (Scotland) Amendment Regulations 2000 (S.S.I. 2000/170)
- Meat (Enhanced Enforcement Powers) (Scotland) Regulations 2000 (S.S.I. 2000/171)
- Census (Scotland) Amendment Order 2000 (S.S.I. 2000/172)
- Loch Moidart, North Channel, Scallop Several Fishery (Scotland) Order 2000 (S.S.I. 2000/173)
- Civic Government (Scotland) Act 1982 (Licensing of Houses in Multiple Occupation) Order 2000 (S.S.I. 2000/177)
- Contaminated Land (Scotland) Regulations 2000 (S.S.I. 2000/178)
- Planning (Control of Major-Accident Hazards) (Scotland) Regulations 2000 (S.S.I. 2000/179)
- Environment Act 1995 (Commencement No. 17 and Savings Provision) (Scotland) Order 2000 (S.S.I. 2000/180)
- Advice and Assistance (Scotland) Amendment Regulations 2000 (S.S.I. 2000/181)
- Civil Legal Aid (Scotland) Amendment Regulations 2000 (S.S.I. 2000/182)
- Community Care (Direct Payments) (Scotland) Amendment Regulations 2000 (S.S.I. 2000/183)
- Bovines and Bovine Products (Trade) Amendment (Scotland) Regulations 2000 (S.S.I. 2000/184)
- Environmental Protection (Waste Recycling Payments) (Scotland) Regulations 2000 (S.S.I. 2000/185)
- Discontinuance of Prisons (Scotland) Order 2000 (S.S.I. 2000/186)
- Prisons and Young Offenders Institutions (Scotland) Amendment Rules 2000 (S.S.I. 2000/187)
- National Health Service (General Dental Services) (Scotland) Amendment Regulations 2000 (S.S.I. 2000/188)
- Debtors (Scotland) Act 1987 (Amendment) Regulations 2000 (S.S.I. 2000/189)
- National Health Service (General Medical Services) (Scotland) Amendment (No. 2) Regulations 2000 (S.S.I. 2000/190)
- National Health Service (Choice of Medical Practitioner) (Scotland) Amendment Regulations 2000 (S.S.I. 2000/191)
- Food Protection (Emergency Prohibitions) (Paralytic Shellfish Poisoning) (Orkney) (Scotland) Order 2000 (S.S.I. 2000/192)
- Police Pensions (Scotland) Amendment Regulations 2000 (S.S.I. 2000/193)
- Census (Scotland) Amendment Regulations 2000 (S.S.I. 2000/194)
- Education (Assisted Places) (Scotland) Amendment Regulations 2000 (S.S.I. 2000/195)
- St Mary's Music School (Aided Places) Amendment (Scotland) Regulations 2000 (S.S.I. 2000/196)
- Undersized Lobsters (Scotland) Order 2000 (S.S.I. 2000/197)
- Undersized Spider Crabs (Scotland) Order 2000 (S.S.I. 2000/198)
- Local Government Pension Scheme (Scotland) Amendment Regulations 2000 (S.S.I. 2000/199)
- Education (Student Loans) (Scotland) Regulations 2000 (S.S.I. 2000/200)

== 201-300 ==
- Seed Potatoes (Scotland) Regulations 2000 (S.S.I. 2000/201)
- National Health Service (Professions Supplementary to Medicine) (Scotland) Amendment Regulations 2000 (S.S.I. 2000/202)
- Local Government (Exemption from Competition) (Scotland) Amendment Order 2000 (S.S.I. 2000/206)
- Local Authorities (Goods and Services) (Public Bodies) (Scotland) Order 2000 (S.S.I. 2000/207)
- Local Government Act 1988 (Competition) (Scotland) Amendment Regulations 2000 (S.S.I. 2000/208)
- Processed Cereal-based Foods and Baby Foods for Infants and Young Children Amendment (Scotland) Regulations 2000 (S.S.I. 2000/214)
- Suckler Cow Premium Amendment (Scotland) Regulations 2000 (S.S.I. 2000/215)
- Animals and Animal Products (Import and Export) (Scotland) Regulations 2000 (S.S.I. 2000/216)
- Infant Formula and Follow-on Formula Amendment (Scotland) Regulations 2000 (S.S.I. 2000/217)
- Food Protection (Emergency Prohibitions) (Paralytic Shellfish Poisoning) (Orkney) (No. 2) (Scotland) Order 2000 (S.S.I. 2000/222)
- Adoption (Intercountry Aspects) Act 1999 (Commencement No. 2) (Scotland) Order 2000 (S.S.I. 2000/223)
- National Health Service (Functions of the Common Services Agency) (Scotland) Amendment Order 2000 (S.S.I. 2000/224)
- Prohibition of Fishing with Multiple Trawls (Scotland) Order 2000 (S.S.I. 2000/226)
- Sea Fish (Specified Sea Areas) (Regulation of Nets and Other Fishing Gear) (Scotland) Order 2000 (S.S.I. 2000/227)
- Undersized Edible Crabs (Scotland) Order 2000 (S.S.I. 2000/228)
- Tetrachloroethylene in Olive Oil (Scotland) Revocation Regulations 2000 (S.S.I. 2000/229)
- Comhairle nan Eilean Siar (Ardveenish) Harbour Revision Order 2000 (S.S.I. 2000/233)
- West of Scotland Water Authority (Dalmally, River Strae) Water Order 2000 (S.S.I. 2000/236)
- West of Scotland Water Authority (Eredine, Allt Garbh) Water Order 2000 (S.S.I. 2000/237)
- Welfare Reform and Pensions Act 1999 (Scotland) (Commencement No. 8) Order 2000 (S.S.I. 2000/238)
- Act of Sederunt (Sheriff Court Ordinary Cause Rules Amendment) (Miscellaneous) 2000 (S.S.I. 2000/239)
- Education (Student Loans) Amendment (Scotland) Regulations 2000 (S.S.I. 2000/240)
- Beet Seeds (Amendment) (Scotland) Regulations 2000 (S.S.I. 2000/246)
- Fodder Plant Seeds (Amendment) (Scotland) Regulations 2000 (S.S.I. 2000/247)
- Cereal Seeds (Amendment) (Scotland) Regulations 2000 (S.S.I. 2000/248)
- Oil and Fibre Plant Seeds (Amendment) (Scotland) Regulations 2000 (S.S.I. 2000/249)
- Vegetable Seeds (Amendment) (Scotland) Regulations 2000 (S.S.I. 2000/250)
- Standards in Scotland's Schools etc. Act 2000 (Commencement No. 1) Order 2000 (S.S.I. 2000/258)
- Council Tax (Administration and Enforcement) (Scotland) Amendment (No. 2) Regulations 2000 (S.S.I. 2000/261)
- Food Protection (Emergency Prohibitions) (Paralytic Shellfish Poisoning) (Orkney) (No. 3) (Scotland) Order 2000 (S.S.I. 2000/266)
- Food Protection (Emergency Prohibitions) (Amnesic Shellfish Poisoning) (West Coast) (Scotland) Order 2000 (S.S.I. 2000/267)
- Electricity Lands and Water Undertakings (Rateable Values)(Scotland) Amendment Order 2000 (S.S.I. 2000/284)
- Docks and Harbours (Rateable Values) (Scotland) Order 2000 (S.S.I. 2000/285)
- Protection of Wrecks (Designation) (Scotland) Order 2000 (S.S.I. 2000/287)
- Meat (Disease Control) (Scotland) Regulations 2000 (S.S.I. 2000/288)
- Associated British Ports (Troon) Harbour Revision Order 2000 (S.S.I. 2000/289)
- Farm Woodland Premium Scheme Amendment (Scotland) Regulations 2000 (S.S.I. 2000/290)
- Food Protection (Emergency Prohibitions) (Amnesic ShellfishPoisoning) (West Coast) (No. 2) (Scotland) Order 2000 (S.S.I. 2000/291)
- Education and Training (Scotland) Regulations 2000 (S.S.I. 2000/292)
- Education (Listed Bodies) Order 2000 (S.S.I. 2000/293)
- West of Scotland Water Authority (Craighouse, Abhainn a'Mhinisteir) Water Order 2000 (S.S.I. 2000/294)
- Food Protection (Emergency Prohibitions) (Paralytic Shellfish Poisoning) (Orkney) (No. 4) (Scotland) Order 2000 (S.S.I. 2000/295)
- Standards in Scotland's Schools etc. Act 2000 (Commencement No. 2 and Transitional Provisions) Order 2000 (S.S.I. 2000/298)
- Export of Pigs, Porcine Material and Bovine Animals (Scotland) Regulations 2000 (S.S.I. 2000/300)

== 301-400 ==
- Human Rights Act 1998 (Jurisdiction) (Scotland) Rules 2000 (S.S.I. 2000/301)
- Food Protection (Emergency Prohibitions) (Amnesic Shellfish Poisoning) (West Coast) (No. 3) (Scotland) Order 2000 (S.S.I. 2000/303)
- Budget (Scotland) Act 2000 (Amendment) Order 2000 (S.S.I. 2000/307)
- General Medical Council (Legal Assessors) Amendment (Scotland) Rules 2000 (S.S.I. 2000/308)
- Food Irradiation Provisions (Scotland) Regulations 2000 (S.S.I. 2000/309)
- West of Scotland Water Authority (Lochnaw) Ordinary Drought Order 2000 (S.S.I. 2000/310)
- National Parks (Scotland) Act 2000 (Commencement) Order 2000 (S.S.I. 2000/312)
- Food Protection (Emergency Prohibitions) (Amnesic Shellfish Poisoning) (West Coast) (No. 2) (Scotland) Partial Revocation Order 2000 (S.S.I. 2000/313)
- Act of Sederunt (Evidence of Judgments etc.) (Human Rights Act 1998) 2000 (S.S.I. 2000/314)
- Act of Adjournal (Criminal Procedure Rules Amendment No. 2) (Human Rights Act 1998) 2000 (S.S.I. 2000/315)
- Act of Sederunt (Rules of the Court of Session Amendment No. 6) (Human Rights Act 1998) 2000 (S.S.I. 2000/316)
- Act of Sederunt (Rules of the Court of Session Amendment No. 5) (Public Interest Intervention in Judicial Review) 2000 (S.S.I. 2000/317)
- Food Protection (Emergency Prohibitions) (Paralytic Shellfish Poisoning) (Orkney) (No. 3) (Scotland) Partial Revocation Order 2000 (S.S.I. 2000/318)
- Act of Sederunt (Rules of the Court of Session Amendment No. 4) (Applications under s. 1 of the Administration of Justice (Scotland) Act 1972) 2000 (S.S.I. 2000/319)
- Electricity Works (Environmental Impact Assessment) (Scotland) Regulations 2000 (S.S.I. 2000/320)
- Pollution Prevention and Control Act 1999 (Commencement No. 2) (Scotland) Order 2000 (S.S.I. 2000/322)
- Pollution Prevention and Control (Scotland) Regulations 2000 (S.S.I. 2000/323)
- Diseases of Fish (Control) Amendment (Scotland) Regulations 2000 (S.S.I. 2000/330)
- National Health Service Trusts (Originating Capital) (Scotland) Amendment Order 2000 (S.S.I. 2000/337)
- Land Registration (Scotland) Act 1979 (Commencement No. 14) Order 2000 (S.S.I. 2000/338)
- Regulation of Investigatory Powers (Notification of Authorisations etc.) (Scotland) Order 2000 (S.S.I. 2000/340)
- Regulation of Investigatory Powers (Scotland) Act 2000 (Commencement) Order 2000 (S.S.I. 2000/341)
- Education and Training (Scotland) Amendment Regulations 2000 (S.S.I. 2000/342)
- Regulation of Investigatory Powers (Prescription of Offices, Ranks and Positions) (Scotland) Order 2000 (S.S.I. 2000/343)
- Specified Risk Material Order Amendment (Scotland) Regulations 2000 (S.S.I. 2000/344)
- Specified Risk Material Amendment (Scotland) Regulations 2000 (S.S.I. 2000/345)
- Food Protection (Emergency Prohibitions) (Amnesic Shellfish Poisoning) (West Coast) (No. 2) (Scotland) Partial Revocation (No. 2) Order 2000 (S.S.I. 2000/346)
- Agricultural Subsidies (Appeals) (Scotland) Regulations 2000 (S.S.I. 2000/347)
- National Health Service (General Dental Services) (Scotland) Amendment (No. 2) Regulations 2000 (S.S.I. 2000/352)
- Borders General Hospital National Health Service Trust (Establishment) Amendment Order 2000 (S.S.I. 2000/353)
- Dumfries and Galloway Acute and Maternity Hospitals National Health Service Trust (Establishment) Amendment Order 2000 (S.S.I. 2000/354)
- Yorkhill National Health Service Trust (Establishment) Amendment Order 2000 (S.S.I. 2000/355)
- Food Protection (Emergency Prohibitions) (Amnesic Shellfish Poisoning) (West Coast) (No. 4) (Scotland) Order 2000 (S.S.I. 2000/359)
- Food Protection (Emergency Prohibitions) (Amnesic Shellfish Poisoning) (East Coast) (Scotland) Order 2000 (S.S.I. 2000/360)
- Standards in Scotland's Schools etc. Act 2000 (Commencement No. 3 and Transitional Provisions) Order 2000 (S.S.I. 2000/361)
- Brucellosis (Scotland) Regulations 2000 (S.S.I. 2000/364)
- Enzootic Bovine Leukosis (Scotland) Regulations 2000 (S.S.I. 2000/365)
- Teachers' Superannuation (Scotland) Amendment Regulations 2000 (S.S.I. 2000/366)
- Food Protection (Emergency Prohibitions) (Amnesic Shellfish Poisoning) (West Coast) (No. 3) (Scotland) Partial Revocation Order 2000 (S.S.I. 2000/369)
- Food Protection (Emergency Prohibitions) (Amnesic Shellfish Poisoning) (East Coast) (No. 2) (Scotland) Order 2000 (S.S.I. 2000/370)
- Gaming Clubs (Hours) (Scotland) Regulations 2000 (S.S.I. 2000/371)
- Food Protection (Emergency Prohibitions) (Amnesic Shellfish Poisoning) (West Coast) (No. 3) (Scotland) Revocation Order 2000 (S.S.I. 2000/372)
- Food Protection (Emergency Prohibitions) (Amnesic Shellfish Poisoning) (West Coast) (No. 2) (Scotland) Partial Revocation (No. 3) Order 2000 (S.S.I. 2000/378)
- Food Protection (Emergency Prohibitions) (Amnesic Shellfish Poisoning) (East Coast) (Scotland) Partial Revocation Order 2000 (S.S.I. 2000/381)
- Food Protection (Emergency Prohibitions) (Paralytic Shellfish Poisoning) (Orkney) (No. 3) (Scotland) Revocation Order 2000 (S.S.I. 2000/382)
- Food Protection (Emergency Prohibitions) (Paralytic Shellfish Poisoning) (Orkney) (No. 4) (Scotland) Partial Revocation Order 2000 (S.S.I. 2000/383)
- Act of Sederunt (Summary Applications, Statutory Applications and Appeals etc. Rules) Amendment (No. 2) (Administration of Justice (Scotland) Act 1972) 2000 (S.S.I. 2000/387)
- Act of Sederunt (Child Care and Maintenance Rules) Amendment 2000 (S.S.I. 2000/388)
- Food Protection (Emergency Prohibitions) (Amnesic Shellfish Poisoning) (West Coast) (No. 4) (Scotland) Revocation Order 2000 (S.S.I. 2000/389)
- Adoption (Intercountry Aspects) Act 1999 (Commencement No. 4) (Scotland) Order 2000 (S.S.I. 2000/390)
- Dairy Produce Quotas Amendment (No. 2) (Scotland) Regulations 2000 (S.S.I. 2000/391)
- Divorce etc. (Pensions) (Scotland) Amendment Regulations 2000 (S.S.I. 2000/392)
- Potatoes Originating in Egypt (Amendment) (No. 2) (Scotland) Regulations 2000 (S.S.I. 2000/393)
- National Health Service (General Dental Services) (Scotland) Amendment (No. 3) Regulations 2000 (S.S.I. 2000/394)
- National Health Service (Optical Charges and Payments) (Scotland) Amendment (No. 2) Regulations 2000 (S.S.I. 2000/395)
- National Health Service (Charges for Drugs and Appliances) (Scotland) Amendment (No. 2) Regulations 2000 (S.S.I. 2000/396)
- Advice and Assistance (Scotland) Amendment (No. 2) Regulations 2000 (S.S.I. 2000/399)

== 401-453 ==
- Food Protection (Emergency Prohibitions) (Amnesic Shellfish Poisoning) (East Coast) (Scotland) Revocation Order 2000 (S.S.I. 2000/402)
- Local Authorities (Goods and Services) (Public Bodies) (No. 2) (Scotland) Order 2000 (S.S.I. 2000/403)
- Food Protection (Emergency Prohibitions) (Amnesic Shellfish Poisoning) (West Coast) (No. 2) (Scotland) Partial Revocation (No. 4) Order 2000 (S.S.I. 2000/404)
- Prohibition of Fishing with Multiple Trawls (No. 2) (Scotland) Order 2000 (S.S.I. 2000/405)
- Education (Provision of Information as to Schools) (Scotland) Amendment Regulations 2000 (S.S.I. 2000/406)
- Education (School and Placing Information) (Scotland) Amendment Regulations 2000 (S.S.I. 2000/407)
- Act of Sederunt (Ordinary Cause Rules) Amendment (No. 2) (Pension Sharing on Divorce etc.) 2000 (S.S.I. 2000/408)
- Food Protection (Emergency Prohibitions) (Amnesic Shellfish Poisoning) (West Coast) (No. 5) (Scotland) Order 2000 (S.S.I. 2000/409)
- Act of Sederunt (Rules of the Court of Session Amendment No. 7) (Pension Sharing on Divorce etc.) 2000 (S.S.I. 2000/412)
- Food Protection (Emergency Prohibitions) (Paralytic Shellfish Poisoning) (Orkney) (Scotland) Partial Revocation Order 2000 (S.S.I. 2000/413)
- Food Protection (Emergency Prohibitions) (Paralytic Shellfish Poisoning) (Orkney) (No. 4) (Scotland) Revocation Order 2000 (S.S.I. 2000/414)
- Sheep and Goats Identification (Scotland) Regulations 2000 (S.S.I. 2000/418)
- Act of Sederunt (Fees of Sheriff Officers) 2000 (S.S.I. 2000/419)
- Act of Sederunt (Fees of Solicitors in the Sheriff Court) (Amendment) 2000 (S.S.I. 2000/420)
- Act of Sederunt (Fees of Messengers-At-Arms) 2000 (S.S.I. 2000/421)
- Train Operating Companies (Rateable Values) (Scotland) (No. 2) Order 2000 (S.S.I. 2000/424)
- Local Statutory Provisions (Postponement from Repeal) (Scotland) Order 2000 (S.S.I. 2000/425)
- Food Protection (Emergency Prohibitions) (Amnesic Shellfish Poisoning) (West Coast) (No. 6) (Scotland) Order 2000 (S.S.I. 2000/428)
- Common Agricultural Policy Support Schemes (Modulation) (Scotland) Regulations 2000 (S.S.I. 2000/429)
- Financial Assistance for Environmental Purposes (Scotland) Order 2000 (S.S.I. 2000/430)
- Plastic Materials and Articles in Contact with Food (Amendment) (Scotland) Regulations 2000 (S.S.I. 2000/431)
- Control of Pollution (Registers) and (Consent for Discharges) (Secretary of State Functions) Amendment Regulations 2000 (S.S.I. 2000/432)
- Environment Act 1995 (Commencement No. 19) (Scotland) Order 2000 (S.S.I. 2000/433)
- Food Protection (Emergency Prohibitions) (Amnesic ShellfishPoisoning) (West Coast) (Scotland) Partial Revocation Order 2000 (S.S.I. 2000/434)
- Food Protection (Emergency Prohibitions) (Amnesic ShellfishPoisoning) (West Coast) (No. 2) (Scotland) Partial Revocation (No. 5) Order 2000 (S.S.I. 2000/435)
- Food Protection (Emergency Prohibitions) (Amnesic ShellfishPoisoning) (East Coast) (No. 2) (Scotland) Partial Revocation Order 2000 (S.S.I. 2000/436)
- Divorce etc. (Pensions) (Scotland) Amendment (No. 2) Regulations 2000 (S.S.I. 2000/438)
- Food Protection (Emergency Prohibitions) (Amnesic Shellfish Poisoning) (East Coast) (No. 2) (Scotland) Revocation Order 2000 (S.S.I. 2000/440)
- Food Protection (Emergency Prohibitions) (Amnesic Shellfish Poisoning) (West Coast) (Scotland) Partial Revocation (No. 2) Order 2000 (S.S.I. 2000/441)
- Welfare of Farmed Animals (Scotland) Regulations 2000 (S.S.I. 2000/442)
- Education (National Priorities) (Scotland) Order 2000 (S.S.I. 2000/443)
- Teachers' Superannuation (Additional Voluntary Contributions) (Scotland) Amendment Regulations 2000 (S.S.I. 2000/444)
- Youth Justice and Criminal Evidence Act 1999 (Commencement No. 6) (Scotland) Order 2000 (S.S.I. 2000/445)
- Food Protection (Emergency Prohibitions) (Amnesic Shellfish Poisoning) (West Coast) (No. 5) (Scotland) Revocation Order 2000 (S.S.I. 2000/446)
- Births, Deaths, Marriages and Divorces (Fees) (Scotland) Amendment Regulations 2000 (S.S.I. 2000/447)
- Agricultural Business Development Scheme (Scotland) Regulations 2000 (S.S.I. 2000/448)
- Fresh Meat (Beef Controls) (No. 2) Amendment (Scotland) Regulations 2000 (S.S.I. 2000/449)
- Act of Sederunt (Rules of the Court of Session Amendment No. 8) (Fees of Solicitors) 2000 (S.S.I. 2000/450)
- Producer Responsibility Obligations (packaging waste) Amendment (Scotland) Regulations 2000 (S.S.I. 2000/451)
- Sexual Offences (Amendment) Act 2000 (Commencement No. 2) (Scotland) Order 2000 (S.S.I. 2000/452)
- Feeding Stuffs (Scotland) Regulations 2000 (S.S.I. 2000/453)
