= Desmond Ackner, Baron Ackner =

British judge

The Right Honourable The Lord Ackner PC
- Ackner in 1961

Member of the House of Lords
- Lord Temporal
- Lord of Appeal in Ordinary; 30 January 1986 – 21 March 2006

Lord of Appeal in Ordinary

Justice of the High Court

Lord Justice of Appeal

Desmond James Conrad Ackner, Baron Ackner, PC (18 September 1920 – 21 March 2006) was a British judge and Lord of Appeal in Ordinary.

== Early life ==
Ackner was the son of a Jewish dentist, Dr Conrad Ackner, from Vienna, who came to Great Britain before the First World War. He was educated at Highgate School, before studying at Clare College, Cambridge, where he read economics and law, and where he was later an honorary fellow. During the Second World War, he was commissioned into the Royal Artillery, although a twisted foot kept him out of active service and he was transferred to the Admiralty's naval law branch.

== Legal and judicial career ==
Ackner was called to the bar by the Middle Temple in 1945, practising mainly commercial law. He became a Queen's Counsel in 1961, a bencher of Middle Temple in 1965 and was later treasurer in 1984. He came to public notice acting for victims of thalidomide in the late 1960s in their action for damages against the manufacturer of the drug, Distillers, which was settled before trial, and as counsel for the families of the victims at the public inquiry into the Aberfan disaster in 1967, in which he condemned the "callous indifference, incompetence, ignorance and inertia" in the National Coal Board. Ackner proved to be an inspired choice and he remains a local hero in Aberfan, where a bench in the memorial garden bears a plaque in his memory.

He subsequently appeared in a number of very public libel actions, including acting for John Bloom, International Herald Tribune, Svetlana Alliluyeva (Joseph Stalin's daughter) and Lee Kwan Yew (Prime Minister of Singapore) and The Spectator.

He was elected to the Bar Council in 1957, was treasurer in 1964, vice-chairman in 1966, and chairman in 1968. He was appointed Recorder of Swindon in 1962, and became an Appellate Judge of Jersey and Guernsey in 1967, serving in both offices until he was appointed a High Court Judge of the Queen's Bench Division in 1971, receiving the customary knighthood. He became a judge of the Commercial Court in 1973, and was promoted to become a Lord Justice of Appeal and was appointed to the Privy Council in 1980. Three years later, in 1983, he became an honorary fellow of Clare College, Cambridge.

On 30 January 1986, he was appointed Lord of Appeal in Ordinary, and was made a life peer as Baron Ackner, of Sutton in the County of West Sussex. He joined in the majority in the House of Lords in 1987 in the 3:2 judgment imposing an injunction to prevent The Guardian, The Observer and The Sunday Times newspapers publishing extracts from Peter Wright's book, Spycatcher, saying that failing to impose an injunction would be a "charter for traitors". He also joined in decisions banning broadcasts by the Provisional Irish Republican Army and Sinn Féin and ruled in the R v R case that a man could be convicted of the rape of his wife (overturning a century of judicial precedent).

== Retirement ==
He retired as a Law Lord in 1992 but continued to attend the Lords as a crossbencher. He remained active in Bar politics, supporting the traditional division of the legal profession in the UK and opposing the extension of rights of audience to solicitors.

== Arms ==
Coat of arms of Desmond Ackner, Baron Ackner
Crest Upon a helm with a wreath Or and Sable a short-eared owl Proper crowned Or supporting with the dexter claw a clarion Azure. Escutcheon Sable in fess issuant from a barrulet wavy Azure fimbriated Argent a representation of the bridge of Clare College Cambridge Proper the whole between two whales spouting naiant counter naiant Gold. Supporters Two otters each holding in the mouth a trout Gold the compartment comprising a river bank with bulrushes growing therefrom Proper. Motto Non Servimus Justitiae Silendo
