= Chemical Propulsion Information Analysis Center =

DoD sponsored Information Analysis Center

Coordinates: 39°12′53″N 76°52′15″W

- at Johns Hopkins University

DTIC IAC overview
- Preceding agencies: Chemical Propulsion Information Agency (CPIA), 1962; Liquid Propellant Information Agency (LPIA), 1958; Solid Propellant Information Agency (SPIA), 1948; Rocket Propellant Information Agency (RPIA), 1946
- Headquarters: Columbia, Maryland
- Website: www.cpiac.jhu.edu

The Chemical Propulsion Information Analysis Center (CPIAC) is one of several United States Department of Defense (DoD) sponsored Information Analysis Centers (IACs), administered by the Defense Technical Information Center (DTIC). CPIAC is the oldest IAC, having been in continuous operation since 1946 when it was founded as the Rocket Propellant Information Agency as part of the Johns Hopkins University's Applied Physics Laboratory. Currently CPIAC is operated by The Johns Hopkins University, Whiting School of Engineering. IACs are part of the DoD’s Scientific and Technical Information Program (STIP) prescribed by DoD Directive 3200.12 and are chartered under DoD Instruction 3200.14-E5.

CPIAC is the U.S. national clearinghouse and technical resource center for data, reports, and analyses related to system and component level technologies for chemical, electrical, and nuclear propulsion for rockets, missiles, and space and gun propulsion systems. CPIAC also provides technical and administrative support to the Joint Army-Navy-NASA-Air Force (JANNAF) Interagency Propulsion Committee, the primary technical information exchange platform for the U.S. propulsion industry.

In addition to maintaining the most comprehensive propulsion-related scientific and technical reports collection in the world, CPIAC also functions to disseminate and educate eligible individuals and organizations on the subject. CPIAC maintains a number of industry handbooks, manuals, databases, and its signature Propulsion Information Retrieval System (PIRS). This extensive information collection represents the documented national knowledge base in chemical rocket propulsion.

CPIAC assists sponsors in maximizing increasingly limited research and development funding by focusing on key propulsion system technology needs through workshops, symposia, technical assessments, and surveys. CPIAC also performs research in support of its publication of a series of recurrent technology reviews and state-of-the-art reports in selected technical areas.

== History of CPIAC ==
The rapid technological advances of the U.S. rocket industry during World War II, accomplished primarily through the wartime Office of Scientific Research and Development (OSRD) and its cadre of leading scientists, produced a substantial foundation of technical reports and data on solid rockets, propellants, and ballistics. Following deactivation of the OSRD in 1945, several of these early scientists accepted positions at the fledgling Johns Hopkins University Applied Physics Laboratory (APL) and were subsequently appointed by Commander (later Admiral) Levering Smith to serve on the post-war Navy Bureau of Ordnance (BuOrd) Propellant and Ignition Advisory Group. In April 1946, at the suggestion of Dr. Ralph E. Gibson (later to become the second director of APL), the group recommended the establishment of “a rocket intelligence agency with one main responsibility—that of promoting rapid circulation of technical information to all activities concerned.” Armed with $20,000 in BuOrd funding, APL established the initial Rocket Propellant Information Agency (RPIA) on 3 December 1946 to consolidate, organize, and catalog the inventory of wartime reports.

In 1948, the addition of Army sponsorship and accompanying expansion of agency scope into gun propellants prompted a name change to the Solid Propellant Information Agency (SPIA). SPIA subsequently assumed responsibility for organizing and publishing the proceedings of the Joint Army-Navy and Interagency Solid Propellant Group Meetings, which later evolved into the JANNAF Propulsion Meeting. The previously sporadic industry technical exchange meetings were now formalized and conducted on a regular basis. The Air Force and NASA joined in sponsorship of SPIA in 1951 and 1959, respectively. With the establishment of NASA and increased activity in liquid-fueled rockets, missiles, and space vehicles, the Navy established the companion Liquid Propellant Information Agency (LPIA) at APL in 1958. On December 1, 1962, the SPIA and LPIA combined operations to form the Chemical Propulsion Information Agency. At the same time, CPIAC’s scope was expanded to include airbreathing, electrical, nuclear, and gun propulsion. The Interagency Chemical Rocket Propulsion Group (ICRPG), predecessor of the current JANNAF Interagency Propulsion Committee, was also chartered that year.

In 1964, CPIAC became a DoD Information Analysis Center under the Naval Sea Systems Command. In 1980, the Defense Technical Information Center (DTIC) assumed administrative oversight of CPIAC, and in 1990, the operation of CPIAC was transferred from APL to The Johns Hopkins University Whiting School of Engineering. While CPIAC’s core functions have expanded significantly over the years, its founding mission of report collection activities has continued uninterrupted to date, making CPIAC the custodian of the most comprehensive chemical propulsion scientific and technical reports collection in the world.
