= Sex Offenders Act 1997 =

Act of the Parliament of the United Kingdom

Sex Offenders Act 1997 (Note: Section 10(1).)
- Act of Parliament
- Parliament of the United Kingdom
- Long title: An Act to require the notification of information to the police by persons who have committed certain sexual offences; to make provision with respect to the commission of certain sexual acts outside the United Kingdom; and for connected purposes.
- Citation: 1997 c. 51
- Territorial extent: England and Wales; Northern Ireland (except section 8); Scotland (part I and section 8); (Note: Section 10(4)–(5).)

Dates
- Royal assent: 21 March 1997
- Commencement: 1 September 1997 (Note: Section 10(2). The Sex Offenders Act 1997 (Commencement) Order 1997 (SI 1997/1920).)
- Repealed: 1 May 2004 (Note: The Sexual Offences Act 2003 (Commencement) Order 2004 (SI 2004/874).)

Other legislation
- Amends: Criminal Law (Consolidation) (Scotland) Act 1995
- Amended by: Crime and Disorder Act 1998; Sexual Offences (Amendment) Act 2000; Justice (Northern Ireland) Act 2002
- Repealed by: Sexual Offences Act 2003

Status: Repealed

Text of statute as originally enacted

Revised text of statute as amended

The Sex Offenders Act 1997 (c. 51) was an act of the Parliament of the United Kingdom, which made various sex offenders (defined as anyone who has been convicted of sexual offences) subject to notification requirements, thereby implementing a sex offenders registry. It also gave courts in the UK extraterritorial jurisdiction over a range of sexual offences. The act is sometimes described as the Sexual Offences Act 1997.

The act was part of a collection of legislation concerning sex offenders in part or in whole, including the Crime (Sentences) Act 1997, the Children (Protection from Offenders) Regulation 1997 and Crime and Disorder Act 1998.

== Provisions ==
The act enabled police to obtain Community Protection Orders to require that sex offenders be prohibited be from going to places such as school playgrounds.

All convicted sex offenders became required to

The act required all sex offenders to notify the police of changes to their name, address and other personal details.

== Implementation ==
The Sex Offenders Register was officially established on 1 September 1997.

== Reception ==
The legislation received the support of the Labour Party in opposition.

== Subsequent developments ==
The whole act was repealed by section 140 of, and schedule 7 to, the Sexual Offences Act 2003, which came into force on 1 May 2004, subject to the saving in section 142(5).

The provisions of this act were replaced by part II of the Sexual Offences Act 2003.
