= Indecency with Children Act 1960 =

Act of the Parliament of the United Kingdom

Indecency with Children Act 1960 (Note: Section 3(1).)
- Act of Parliament
- Parliament of the United Kingdom
- Long title: An Act to make further provision for the punishment of indecent conduct towards young children, and to increase the maximum sentence of imprisonment under the Sexual Offences Act 1956, for certain existing offences against young girls.
- Citation: 8 & 9 Eliz. 2. c. 33
- Territorial extent: England and Wales (Note: Section 3(2).)

Dates
- Royal assent: 2 June 1960
- Commencement: 2 July 1960 (Note: Section 3(3).)
- Repealed: 1 May 2004 (Note: The Sexual Offences Act 2003 (Commencement) Order 2004 (SI 2004/874))
Other legislation
Amends	Sexual Offences Act 1956
Amended by	Sexual Offences Act 1985
Repealed by	Sexual Offences Act 2003
Relates to	Criminal Justice Act 1967; Police and Criminal Evidence Act 1984; Sexual Offenders Act 1985; Criminal Justice and Court Services Act 2000

Status: Repealed

Text of statute as originally enacted

Revised text of statute as amended

The Indecency with Children Act 1960 (8 & 9 Eliz. 2. c. 33) was an act of the Parliament of the United Kingdom that expanded English criminal law in relation to sexual acts with minors. The Act made it a crime to incite or commit an "act of gross indecency" with somebody under the age of fourteen. It was repealed by the Sexual Offences Act 2003.

== Background ==
The act came about as the result of the First Report of the Criminal Law Revision Committee, which examined the flaw in criminal law relating to indecent assaults against children. Under the law as it then stood, there was no "indecent assault" unless there was some form of threat or show of force to the victim, and the Act was intended to close this gap. The Act came into force on 2 July 1960, and Section 1 made it an offence to commit or incite an "act of gross indecency" with somebody under the age of fourteen. The infractor was liable to imprisonment for up to two years on conviction after indictment, and six months or a fine of £100 for a summary conviction. These figures were amended by Statutory Instruments in 2000, which increased the imprisonment for conviction after indictment to ten years, or two years for a summary conviction. The fine for a summary conviction was increased by the Criminal Justice Act 1967 to £400.

== Provisions ==
Section 2 of the act increased the punishment for committing incest with a girl under the age of thirteen to seven years in prison for sexual intercourse or attempted sexual intercourse, and five years for indecent assault.

== Subsequent developments ==
The whole act were repealed by section 140 of, and schedule 7 to, the Sexual Offences Act 2003, which came into force on 1 May 2004.

== Bibliography ==
- Downey, B.W.M. (1962). "Indecency with Children Act, 1960". Modern Law Review. 25 (1). Blackwell Publishing. ISSN 0026-7961.
