= Sexual Offences (Northern Ireland) Order 2008 =

Northern Ireland Order in Council

Sexual Offences (Northern Ireland) Order 2008 (Note: Section 1(1).)
- Statutory Instrument
- Parliament of the United Kingdom
- Citation: SI 2008/1769 (NI 2)
- Territorial extent: Northern Ireland

Dates
- Made: 9 July 2008
- Commencement: 16 July 2009 (part I and articles 80 and 82); 2 February 2009 (rest of act); (Note: Section 1(2)–(3). The Sexual Offences (Northern Ireland) Order 2008 (Commencement) Order 2008 (SI 2008/510))

Other legislation
- Amends: Offences Against the Person Act 1861
- Made under: Northern Ireland Act 1998
- Relates to: Sexual Offences Act 2003; Sexual Offences (Scotland) Act 2009

Status: Current legislation

Text of statute as originally enacted

Revised text of statute as amended

Text of the Sexual Offences (Northern Ireland) Order 2008 as in force today (including any amendments) within the United Kingdom, from legislation.gov.uk.

The Sexual Offences (Northern Ireland) Order 2008 (SI 2008/1769) (NI 2) is an order in Council made under section 85 of the Northern Ireland Act 1998.

== Provisions ==
The order provides a legislative framework for sexual offences in Northern Ireland.

The Sexual Offences (Northern Ireland) Order 2008 defines several sexual offenses, including rape. Under the order, sexual activity involving a child under 13 can receive a life sentence.

The order reduced the age of consent from 17 to 16.

== See also ==
- Sexual Offences Act
- Sexual Offences Act 2003
- Sexual Offences (Scotland) Act 2009
- Sexual offences in the United Kingdom
