= Youth Justice and Criminal Evidence Act 1999 =

Act of the Parliament of the United Kingdom

Youth Justice and Criminal Evidence Act 1999 (Note: Section 68(1).)
- Act of Parliament
- Parliament of the United Kingdom
- Long title: An Act to provide for the referral of offenders under 18 to youth offender panels; to make provision in connection with the giving of evidence or information for the purposes of criminal proceedings; to amend section 51 of the Criminal Justice and Public Order Act 1994; to make pre-consolidation amendments relating to youth justice; and for connected purposes.
- Citation: 1999 c. 23
- Territorial extent: England and Wales (Note: Section 68(5). Certain provisions also extend to Scotland and Northern Ireland: section 68(6).)

Dates
- Royal assent: 27 July 1999
- Commencement: 27 July 1999 (certain provisions) (Note: Section 68(4).); Various other dates (Note: Section 68(3).)
Other legislation
Amends	See § Repealed enactments
Repeals/revokes	See § Repealed enactments
Amended by	Access to Justice Act 1999; Criminal Evidence (Northern Ireland) Order 1999; Powers of Criminal Courts (Sentencing) Act 2000; Armed Forces Act 2001; Company Directors Disqualification (Northern Ireland) Order 2002; Courts Act 2003; Criminal Justice (Northern Ireland) Order 2003; Sexual Offences Act 2003; Criminal Justice Act 2003; Companies (Audit, Investigations and Community Enterprise) Act 2004; Companies (Audit, Investigations and Community Enterprise) (Northern Ireland) Order 2005; Companies Act 2006; Police and Justice Act 2006; Armed Forces Act 2006; Legal Services Act 2007; Criminal Justice and Immigration Act 2008; Coroners and Justice Act 2009; Companies Act 2006 (Consequential Amendments, Transitional Provisions and Savings) Order 2009; Northern Ireland Act 1998 (Devolution of Policing and Justice Functions) Order 2010; Legal Aid, Sentencing and Punishment of Offenders Act 2012; Trafficking People for Exploitation Regulations 2013; Special Measures for Child Witnesses (Sexual Offences) Regulations 2013; Criminal Justice and Courts Act 2015; Modern Slavery Act 2015; Armed Forces Act 2016; Modern Slavery Act 2015 (Consequential Amendments) Regulations 2016; Social Services and Well-being (Wales) Act 2014 (Consequential Amendments) Regulations 2016; Sentencing Act 2020; Domestic Abuse Act 2021; Criminal Justice (Electronic Commerce) (Amendment) (EU Exit) Regulations 2021; Justice (Sexual Offences and Trafficking Victims) Act (Northern Ireland) 2022; Police, Crime, Sentencing and Courts Act 2022; Judicial Review and Courts Act 2022

Status: Amended

Text of statute as originally enacted

Revised text of statute as amended

The Youth Justice and Criminal Evidence Act 1999 (c. 23) is an act of the Parliament of the United Kingdom that makes provision for the referral of offenders under 18 to youth offender panels and in connection with the giving of evidence or information for the purposes of criminal proceedings in England and Wales.

== Provisions ==
=== Repealed enactments ===
Section 67(3) of the act repealed or revoked 37 enactments, listed in schedule 6 to the act.

Citation	Short title	Extent of repeal or revocation
61 & 62 Vict. c. 36	Criminal Evidence Act 1898	In section 1, the words from the beginning to "Provided as follows:—".
23 & 24 Geo. 5. c. 12	Children and Young Persons Act 1933	Section 38.
12, 13 & 14 Geo. 6. c. 88	Registered Designs Act 1949	Section 17(11).
1955 c. 18	Army Act 1955	Section 93(1B) and (2).
1955 c. 19	Air Force Act 1955	Section 93(1B) and (2).
1957 c. 53	Naval Discipline Act 1957	Section 60(2) and (3).
1963 c. 37	Children and Young Persons Act 1963	Section 57(2) and (4).
1968 c. 19	Criminal Appeal Act 1968	In section 10(2)(b), the words ", a referral order within the meaning of Part I of the Youth Justice and Criminal Evidence Act 1999 (referral to youth offender panel)".
1968 c. 20	Courts-Martial (Appeals) Act 1968	In section 36(1), the words "section 4(4) of the Sexual Offences (Amendment) Act 1976 as adapted by section 5(1)(d) of that Act or".
1968 c. 60	Theft Act 1968	In section 30(2), the words from "and a person bringing" onwards.
1969 c. 54	Children and Young Persons Act 1969	Section 16(3B) and (3C).
1976 c. 52	Armed Forces Act 1976	In Schedule 3, in paragraph 3(2), the words from "or direct that" onwards.
1976 c. 82	Sexual Offences (Amendment) Act 1976	Sections 2 to 5.
1976 c. 82	Sexual Offences (Amendment) Act 1976	In section 7(4), the words from "except that" onwards.
1976 c. 82	Sexual Offences (Amendment) Act 1976	Section 7(5).
1977 c. 37	Patents Act 1977	Section 32(12).
SI 1978/460 (N.I. 5)	Sexual Offences (Northern Ireland) Order 1978	In Article 1(2), the words from "and Articles 6 and 8" onwards.
SI 1978/460 (N.I. 5)	Sexual Offences (Northern Ireland) Order 1978	Articles 6 and 7.
1978 c. 23	Judicature (Northern Ireland) Act 1978	In Part II of Schedule 5, the amendment of the Sexual Offences (Northern Ireland) Order 1978.
1979 c. 2	Customs and Excise Management Act 1979	Section 75A(6)(b).
1979 c. 2	Customs and Excise Management Act 1979	In section 118A(6)(b), the words "sections 69 and 70 of the Police and Criminal Evidence Act 1984 and".
1980 c. 43	Magistrates' Courts Act 1980	In section 125(4)(c)(iii), the "and" at the end.
1980 c. 43	Magistrates' Courts Act 1980	In section 126(d), the "and" at the end.
1980 c. 43	Magistrates' Courts Act 1980	In Schedule 7, paragraph 148.
1981 c. 55	Armed Forces Act 1981	In Schedule 2, paragraph 9.
1984 c. 60	Police and Criminal Evidence Act 1984	Sections 69 and 70.
1984 c. 60	Police and Criminal Evidence Act 1984	Section 80(1).
1984 c. 60	Police and Criminal Evidence Act 1984	In section 80(5), the words "competent and".
1984 c. 60	Police and Criminal Evidence Act 1984	Section 80(8).
1984 c. 60	Police and Criminal Evidence Act 1984	In section 82(1), in the definition of "proceedings", in paragraph (a) the words after "court-martial" and, in paragraph (b)(i), the words "so constituted".
1984 c. 60	Police and Criminal Evidence Act 1984	Schedule 3.
1985 c. 9	Companies Act 1985	In section 709(3), the words from "In England and Wales" onwards.
1988 c. 33	Criminal Justice Act 1988	In section 23(1), paragraph (c) and the "and" preceding it.
1988 c. 33	Criminal Justice Act 1988	In section 24(1), paragraph (c) and the "and" preceding it.
1988 c. 33	Criminal Justice Act 1988	In section 32(1), paragraph (b) and the "or" preceding it.
1988 c. 33	Criminal Justice Act 1988	Section 32(2), (3A) to (3E) and (6).
1988 c. 33	Criminal Justice Act 1988	Section 32A.
1988 c. 33	Criminal Justice Act 1988	Section 33A.
1988 c. 33	Criminal Justice Act 1988	Section 34A.
1988 c. 33	Criminal Justice Act 1988	Section 158(2) to (4).
1988 c. 33	Criminal Justice Act 1988	In Schedule 13, in paragraph 8, sub-paragraph (2)(b) and the "and" preceding it and, in sub-paragraph (3), ", (2)".
1988 c. 33	Criminal Justice Act 1988	In Schedule 15, paragraph 53.
1990 c. 42	Broadcasting Act 1990	In Schedule 20, paragraphs 26 and 27.
1991 c. 53	Criminal Justice Act 1991	Section 52.
1991 c. 53	Criminal Justice Act 1991	Section 54.
1991 c. 53	Criminal Justice Act 1991	Section 55(2)(b), (4), (6) and (7).
1991 c. 53	Criminal Justice Act 1991	In Schedule 9, paragraphs 3 and 7.
1991 c. 53	Criminal Justice Act 1991	In Schedule 11, paragraph 1 and, in paragraph 37, the words from "and, in subsection (3)" onwards.
1992 c. 34	Sexual Offences (Amendment) Act 1992	In section 5(2), the words "or programme".
1992 c. 34	Sexual Offences (Amendment) Act 1992	In section 6(1), the definition of "written publication" and the "and" preceding it.
1992 c. 34	Sexual Offences (Amendment) Act 1992	In section 7(2), paragraph (b) and paragraph (e) except for the "and" at the end.
1992 c. 34	Sexual Offences (Amendment) Act 1992	Section 7(3).
1994 c. 9	Finance Act 1994	In section 22(2)(b), the words "sections 69 and 70 of the Police and Criminal Evidence Act 1984 and".
1994 c. 9	Finance Act 1994	In Schedule 7, in paragraph 1(6)(b), the words "sections 69 and 70 of the Police and Criminal Evidence Act 1984 and".
1994 c. 23	Value Added Tax Act 1994	In Schedule 11, in paragraph 6(6)(b), the words "sections 69 and 70 of the Police and Criminal Evidence Act 1984 and".
1994 c. 33	Criminal Justice and Public Order Act 1994	Section 50.
1994 c. 33	Criminal Justice and Public Order Act 1994	In Schedule 9, paragraphs 11(1)(a), 13 and 33.
1994 c. 33	Criminal Justice and Public Order Act 1994	In Schedule 10, paragraphs 32, 35(3) and 36.
SI 1994/2795 (N.I. 15)	Criminal Justice (Northern Ireland) Order 1994	Article 2(3).
SI 1994/2795 (N.I. 15)	Criminal Justice (Northern Ireland) Order 1994	Article 18(3).
SI 1994/2795 (N.I. 15)	Criminal Justice (Northern Ireland) Order 1994	Articles 19 to 24.
1995 c. 35	Criminal Appeal Act 1995	In Schedule 2, paragraph 16(2)(b) and (3).
1995 c. 38	Civil Evidence Act 1995	In Schedule 1, paragraph 10.
1996 c. 8	Finance Act 1996	In Schedule 5, in paragraph 2(6)(a), the words "sections 69 and 70 of the Police and Criminal Evidence Act 1984 and".
1996 c. 25	Criminal Procedure and Investigations Act 1996	Section 62.
1996 c. 25	Criminal Procedure and Investigations Act 1996	In Schedule 1, paragraphs 23, 27 and 33.
1996 c. 46	Armed Forces Act 1996	In Schedule 1, paragraph 107(a).
1998 c. 37	Crime and Disorder Act 1998	In section 74(8), the words "this section or".
1998 c. 37	Crime and Disorder Act 1998	In Schedule 5, paragraphs 3(3), 4(6) and 5(6).
SI 1998/1504 (N.I. 9)	Criminal Justice (Children) (Northern Ireland) Order 1998	Article 22.
1999 c. 23	Youth Justice and Criminal Evidence Act 1999	Section 4(7)(d) except for the "or" at the end.
1999 c. 23	Youth Justice and Criminal Evidence Act 1999	In section 15(1), in the definition of "custodial sentence", the words from "a sentence of detention in" to "1994,".
1999 c. 23	Youth Justice and Criminal Evidence Act 1999	In Schedule 1, paragraphs 5(7) and 14(5).
1999 c. 23	Youth Justice and Criminal Evidence Act 1999	In Schedule 4, paragraph 4(2).

== Subsequent developments ==
The act has been amended by several pieces of subsequent legislation. The Courts Act 2003, the Sexual Offences Act 2003, and the Criminal Justice Act 2003 made early amendments. The Criminal Justice and Immigration Act 2008 and the Coroners and Justice Act 2009 extended and modified the special measures provisions in Part II. The Legal Aid, Sentencing and Punishment of Offenders Act 2012 repealed parts of the act relating to referral orders, which were consolidated into new sentencing legislation. More recently, the Domestic Abuse Act 2021 and the Police, Crime, Sentencing and Courts Act 2022 made further amendments to the special measures framework.
