= JANNAF =

Interagency Propulsion Committee chartered by DoD & NASA

Interagency Committee overview
- Preceding agencies: Interagency Chemical Rocket Propulsion Group (ICRPG), 1962; Joint Army-Navy-Air Force (JANAF) Working Group on Solid Propellant Rockets, 1955; Army-Navy Solid Propellant Working Group, 1948; Navy Propellant and Ignition Advisory Group, 1945
- Headquarters: Columbia, Maryland
- Website: www.jannaf.org

The JANNAF Interagency Propulsion Committee (JANNAF IPC, or simply JANNAF) is a joint-agency committee chartered by the USDOD and NASA. JANNAF is composed of two committees: the Technical Committee and the Programmatic & Industrial Base (PIB) Committee. The Technical Committee is itself divided into subcommittees focused on specific technology areas of mutual interest to the DoD and NASA. The JANNAF PIB Committee is a forum for the discussion of strategic program planning and industrial base capabilities in the area of rocket propulsion and energetic systems and components for military and civil space, tactical and strategic missiles, and large gun systems.

JANNAF was re-chartered on June 19, 2014, with the signatures of Frank Kendall III, Under Secretary of Defense for Acquisition, Technology, and Logistics (USD(AT&L)) and Robert Lightfoot Jr., Associate Administrator of the National Aeronautics and Space Administration (NASA).
