= Criminal Procedure and Investigations Act 1996 =

Act of the Parliament of the United Kingdom

Criminal Procedure and Investigations Act 1996 (Note: Section 81.)
- Act of Parliament
- Parliament of the United Kingdom
- Long title: An Act to make provision about criminal procedure and criminal investigations.
- Citation: 1996 c. 25
- Territorial extent: England and Wales; Scotland (in part); Northern Ireland (in part); (Note: Section 79.)

Dates
- Royal assent: 4 July 1996
- Commencement: various (Note: Section 67.)
Other legislation
Amends	Offences Against the Person Act 1861; Courts Act 1971; Attachment of Earnings Act 1971; Criminal Justice Act 1972; Judicature (Northern Ireland) Act 1978; Magistrates' Courts Act 1980; Criminal Justice Act 1988; Criminal Procedure (Scotland) Act 1995
Amended by	Justices of the Peace Act 1997; Crime and Disorder Act 1998; Youth Justice and Criminal Evidence Act 1999; Powers of Criminal Courts (Sentencing) Act 2000; Regulation of Investigatory Powers Act 2000; Justice (Northern Ireland) Act 2002; Terrorism Act 2006; Statute Law (Repeals) Act 2008; Investigatory Powers Act 2016; Sentencing Act 2020

Status: Amended

Text of statute as originally enacted

Text of the Criminal Procedure and Investigations Act 1996 as in force today (including any amendments) within the United Kingdom, from legislation.gov.uk.

The Criminal Procedure and Investigations Act 1996 (c. 25) or CPIA is an act of the Parliament of the United Kingdom that regulates the procedures of investigating and prosecution of criminal offences.

== Provisions ==
=== Part I: Disclosure ===
Following a section of introductory text, the act outlines the relevance of its content in the first section to persons charged with a summary offence, indictable offence or one that is triable either way, as well as the criminal investigation into such an offence and as to whether such a person should be charged with the offence or found guilty of it once charged. It details the procedures for disclosure and continued disclosure by the prosecution to the defence any information "which is in the prosecutor’s possession, and came into his possession in connection with the case for the prosecution against the accused." It also defines a defence statement, defence witnesses and the means by which they should be interviewed, and confidentiality of disclosed information, and other statutory and common law rules of a court.

=== Part II: Criminal Investigations ===
The second part of the act defines a criminal investigation as "an investigation conducted by police officers with a view to it being ascertained whether a person should be charged with an offence, or whether a person charged with an offence is guilty of it." It outlines the codes of practice for any investigation set out by the Secretary of State and the means by which such a code could be revised.

=== Part VII: Miscellaneous and General (chapter 54 to 81) ===
==== Section 54 ====
Section 54 of the act includes the follow administration of justice offences:

- The offence of perverting the course of justice
- The offence under section 51(1) of the Criminal Justice and Public Order Act 1994
- An offence of aiding, abetting, counselling, procuring, suborning or inciting another person to commit an offence under section 1 of the Perjury Act 1911.

== Cases ==
=== Environmental protesters charged with conspiracy to commit aggravated trespass ===
In 2009, twenty six environmental protesters were pre-emptively arrested and later charged with conspiracy to commit aggravated trespass. It was claimed that Ratcliffe-on-Soar Power Station was the intended target. In 2011, their cases were quashed when it was revealed police withheld recordings made by undercover police officer Mark Kennedy. Non-disclosure to the Crown Prosecution Service and defence teams is a breach of the act.
