= Sexual offences in the United Kingdom =

There are a number of sexual offences under the law of England and Wales, the law of Scotland, and the law of Northern Ireland (which function as three separate systems for this purpose)

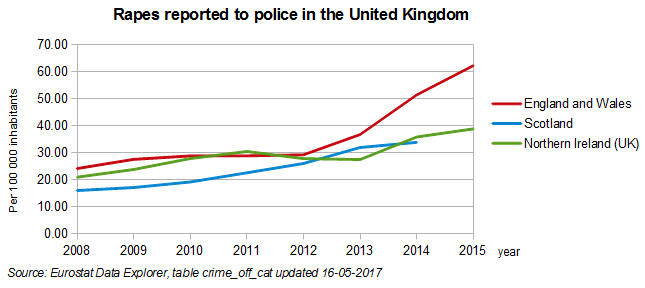
Eurostat rapes reported to police in UK 2008–2015

== Rape ==
Rape has the same statutory definition for all three jurisdictions. Each jurisdiction has its own case law on the interpretation of that legislation. The statutory definition is:

If a person ("A"), with A's penis – penetrates to any extent, without (1) another person ("B") consenting, and (2) without any reasonable belief that B consents, either intending to do so or reckless as to whether there is penetration, the vagina, anus or mouth of B then – A commits an offence, to be known as the offence of rape.

It is therefore only legally possible for a cisgender woman to be guilty of rape if they assist a male assailant in an attack on a third party. Otherwise, a female can be charged with assault by penetration or causing sexual activity without consent, both of which carry similar sentences to rape. The age of consent in all three legal jurisdictions in the United Kingdom is set at 16, a person under 16 years of age is deemed legally incapable of consenting to sexual activity by law.

In England and Wales, with regard to legal definitions, the law currently defines sexual activity with teenagers over 13 but under 16, under the crime of 'sexual activity with a child' - when a child is under 13, the definition in question is automatically shifted to rape, irrespective of context. The Crime and Policing Act 2026 has amended the definition of rape to take place when 'B is under 16 and A does not reasonably believe that B is 16 or over, or B is under 13' - (this section of the act is yet to take effect).

Of women aged 16 to 59 in England & Wales interviewed for the 2006/07 British Crime Survey, 0.5% (1 in every 200) reported that they had suffered rape or attempted rape in the previous year, equating to approximately 85,000 nationally. In the same year, less than 800 persons were convicted of rape.

In June 2026, Reform UK MP Rupert Lowe published a crowd-funded report on the reputed activities of grooming gangs in England. The report suggested that 250,000 girls had been victims of organized child sexual exploitation over several decades and claimed that the offenders in many cases were predominantly British Pakistani Muslim men. The estimate has been disputed, and reviews of the report noted that incomplete national data on offenders ethnicity prevents definitive conclusion about the demographic composition of offenders across all cases. Several sources criticised the report as being inaccurate and misleading, while the Police Service of Northern Ireland stated that there was "no evidence that suggest any of the findings are true".

== England and Wales ==
In England and Wales, there are non-consensual offences of rape, assault by penetration, sexual assault, and sexual activity without consent. There are a number of sexual offences against children under 13, against children under 16, and against child family members. There are a number of sexual offences of abuse of position of trust. There are a number of sexual offences against persons with a mental disorder impeding choice, and of using inducement, threat or deception against person with a mental disorder. There are a number of sexual offences that consist of conduct by care workers against persons with a mental disorder. There is an offence of paying for sexual services of a child, a number of offences relating to child prostitution or pornography, and number of offences relating to indecent photographs of children. There is an offence of extreme pornography. There are offences of loitering or soliciting for purposes of prostitution, and causing, inciting or controlling prostitution for gain. There is an offence of paying for sexual services of a prostitute subjected to force. There are a number of offences relating to brothels and premises used for prostitution. There are a number of offences of trafficking for sexual exploitation, a number of sexual preparatory offences, and a number of offences of sex with an adult relative. There are offences of exposure, voyeurism, bestiality, necrophilia and sexual activity in a public lavatory.

There are notification requirements for sexual offenders. There are powers to impose notification orders, sexual harm prevention orders and sexual risk orders on sexual offenders. There are powers of entry and search against the homes of sexual offenders.

There is statutory provision for the anonymity of victims of sexual offences.

== Northern Ireland ==
In Northern Ireland, there are offences of rape, assault by penetration, sexual assault and sexual activity without consent. There are a number of sexual offences against children under 13, against children under 16, and against child family members. There are a number of sexual offences of abuse of position of trust. There is an offence of paying for sexual services of a child, a number of offences relating to child prostitution or pornography, and number of offences relating to indecent photographs of children. There are a number of sexual offences against persons with a mental disorder impeding choice, and of using inducement, threat or deception against person with a mental disorder. There are a number of sexual offences that consist of conduct by care workers against persons with a mental disorder. There is an offence of extreme pornography. There are offences of loitering or soliciting for purposes of prostitution, kerb-crawling and persistent soliciting, There are a number of offences of causing, inciting or controlling prostitution for gain, and there is an offence of keeping a brothel used for prostitution. There is an offence of paying for sexual services of a person. There are a number of sexual preparatory offences, and a number of offences of sex with an adult relative. There are offences of exposure, voyeurism, bestiality, necrophilia and sexual activity in a public lavatory.

== Scotland ==
In Scotland, there are offences of rape, sexual assault by penetration, sexual assault, sexual coercion, coercing a person into being present during a sexual activity, coercing a person into looking at a sexual image, communicating indecently, sexual exposure, voyeurism, and administering a substance for sexual purposes, and there is a sexual offence of unlawful detention. There are offences of incest and intercourse with step-child. There is a sexual offence of procuring. There are a number of sexual offences against young children, and against older children. There is a sexual offence of meeting a child, and there are a number of offences of sexual abuse of trust. There are a number of offences relating to the sexual services of children and child pornography, and there are a number of offences relating to indecent photographs of children. There are a number of offences relating to the prostitution or seduction of, and premises used for intercourse by, girls under 16. There are offences of trading in prostitution and brothel-keeping, allowing children to be in brothels, and living on earnings of another from male prostitution. There are a number of offences of soliciting, importuning or loitering for the purpose of prostitution. There is an offence of extreme pornography.

There is statutory provision in relation to procedure and evidence on trials for sexual offences, and pardons and disregards for sodomy offences.

== See also ==
- Age-of-consent reform in the United Kingdom
- Crime in the United Kingdom
- Law of the United Kingdom
- Rape statistics
