= Sexual Offences Act 2003 =

Sexual offences legislation in England and Wales

Sexual Offences Act 2003 (Note: Section 143.)
- Act of Parliament
- Parliament of the United Kingdom
- Long title: An Act to make new provision about sexual offences, their prevention and the protection of children from harm from other sexual acts, and for connected purposes.
- Citation: 2003 c. 42
- Territorial extent: England and Wales (Note: Section 142.)

Dates
- Royal assent: 20 November 2003
- Commencement: 20 November 2003 (sections 138 and 141–143); 1 May 2004 (rest of act) (Note: The Sexual Offences Act 2003 (Commencement) Order 2004 (SI 2004/874) and Sexual Offences Act 2003 (Commencement) (Scotland) Order 2004 (SI 2004/138).); (Note: Section 141.)
Other legislation
Amends	Town Police Clauses Act 1847; Offences Against the Person Act 1861; Sexual Offences Act 1956; Street Offences Act 1959; Sexual Offences Act 1967; Theft Act 1968; Criminal Justice Act 1972; Sexual Offences (Amendment) Act 1976; Criminal Law Act 1977; Protection of Children Act 1978; Magistrates' Courts Act 1980; Sexual Offences Act 1985; Criminal Justice Act 1988; Sexual Offences (Amendment) Act 1992; Criminal Justice and Public Order Act 1994; Youth Justice and Criminal Evidence Act 1999; Sexual Offences (Amendment) Act 2000
Repeals/revokes	Vagrancy Act 1898; Indecency with Children Act 1960; Sex Offenders Act 1997
Amended by	Children Act 2004; Civil Partnership Act 2004; Domestic Violence, Crime and Victims Act 2004; Management of Offenders etc. (Scotland) Act 2005; Protection of Children and Prevention of Sexual Offences (Scotland) Act 2005; Serious Organised Crime and Police Act 2005; National Health Service (Consequential Provisions) Act 2006; Armed Forces Act 2006; Police, Public Order and Criminal Justice (Scotland) Act 2006; Violent Crime Reduction Act 2006; Serious Crime Act 2007; Children and Young Persons Act 2008; Criminal Justice and Immigration Act 2008; Education and Skills Act 2008; Coroners and Justice Act 2009; Policing and Crime Act 2009; Sexual Offences (Scotland) Act 2009; Justice Act (Northern Ireland) 2011; Crime and Courts Act 2013; Criminal Justice and Licensing (Scotland) Act 2010; Police Reform and Social Responsibility Act 2011; Domestic Violence, Crime and Victims (Amendment) Act 2012; Health and Social Care Act 2012; Legal Aid, Sentencing and Punishment of Offenders Act 2012; Protection of Freedoms Act 2012; Criminal Justice Act (Northern Ireland) 2013; Anti-Social Behaviour, Crime and Policing Act 2014; Criminal Justice and Courts Act 2015; Human Trafficking and Exploitation (Criminal Justice and Support for Victims) Act (Northern Ireland) 2015; Justice Act (Northern Ireland) 2015; Modern Slavery Act 2015; Serious Crime Act 2015; Abusive Behaviour and Sexual Harm (Scotland) Act 2016; Policing and Crime Act 2017; Data Protection Act 2018; Space Industry Act 2018; Voyeurism (Offences) Act 2019; Sentencing Act 2020; Domestic Abuse Act 2021; Counter-Terrorism and Sentencing Act 2021; Justice (Sexual Offences and Trafficking Victims) Act (Northern Ireland) 2022; Police, Crime, Sentencing and Courts Act 2022; Online Safety Act 2023
Relates to	Sexual Offences (Scotland) Act 2009

Status: Amended

Text of statute as originally enacted

Revised text of statute as amended

The Sexual Offences Act 2003 (c. 42) is an act of the Parliament of the United Kingdom that extends to England and Wales.

It partly replaced the Sexual Offences Act 1956 (4 & 5 Eliz. 2. c. 69) with more specific and explicit wording. It also created several new offences such as non-consensual voyeurism, assault by penetration, causing a child to watch a sexual act, and penetration of any part of a corpse. It defines and sets legal guidelines for rape in English law. It is also the main legislation dealing with child sexual abuse.

The corresponding legislation in Scotland is the Sexual Offences (Scotland) Act 2009 and in Northern Ireland the Sexual Offences (Northern Ireland) Order 2008.

== Major changes ==
Part I of the act makes many changes to the sexual crimes laws in England and Wales (and to some extent Northern Ireland), almost completely replacing the Sexual Offences Act 1956 (4 & 5 Eliz. 2. c. 69).

=== Rape ===
Rape has been redefined from the Sexual Offences Act 1956 (4 & 5 Eliz. 2. c. 69), amended by the Sexual Offences (Amendment) Act 1976 and the Criminal Justice and Public Order Act 1994, to read:

A person (A) commits an offence if—

- (a) he intentionally penetrates the vagina, anus or mouth of another person (B) with his penis,
- (b) B does not consent to the penetration, and
- (c) A does not reasonably believe that B consents.

Rape previously did not include penetration of the mouth. The act also changes the way in which lack of consent may be proved, and section 75 and 76 of the act list circumstances in which lack of consent may be presumed.

=== Assault by penetration ===
Section 2 creates the offence of Assault by penetration. This offence is set out separately because rape is defined as requiring penile penetration. Therefore, non-consensual sexual penetration of the vagina or anus with either another part of the body (such as the fingers), or an object, must be prosecuted under this section. Section 2 closely mirrors section 1's definition of rape, including the same maximum sentence (life imprisonment), but does not include penetration of the mouth, and carries the additional requirement that "the penetration is sexual", i.e. performed for the purpose of either the offender's sexual gratification or the victim's sexual humiliation.

=== Consent ===
The act made significant changes to the legal definition of consent.

Sections 64 and 65 relate to sexual relationships within the family. Section 64 prohibits penetrating any other family member, and section 65 prohibits consenting to such sexual activities. Initially the legislation did not include uncles, aunts, nieces and nephews but after some debate these were written into the provision.

Section 74 states that: "For the purposes of this Part, a person consents if he agrees by choice, and has the freedom and capacity to make that choice."

==== Section 75 ====
Section 75 of the act introduced a number of evidential presumptions, which prove lack of consent unless the defence can provide sufficient, contrary evidence that the claimant did consent. These presumptions require the relevant act to have taken place at the same time as one of six circumstances existed, about which the defendant was aware.

The circumstances are (summarised):

1. violence was used or threatened to be used against the complainant, during or immediately before the act
2. violence was used or threatened to be used against another person, during or immediately before the act
3. complainant was unlawfully detained
4. complainant was asleep/unconscious
5. complainant had a physical disability which prevented them from communicating consent
6. complainant was able to be overpowered/ subdued by a substance administered to him against his will.

==== Section 76 ====
Section 76 of the act introduces two conclusive presumptions. These are:

1. where the defendant deceives the victim as to the nature or purpose of the relevant act (i.e. fraud)
2. where the defendant induces the victim to consent by impersonating someone known to the complainant.

When either is proven, the law states that it is conclusively presumed that the complainant did not consent to the act, and the defendant was aware of the lack of consent. This cannot be rebutted by any contrary evidence, as is possible with section 75.

=== Dual criminality ===
Section 72 provides differing levels of dual criminality for specified offences according to the UK citizenship status of an offender. For UK nationals, acts outside the UK that would amount to an offence in England and Wales can be prosecuted as if they had been done in England and Wales, regardless of whether the acts are lawful where they were done. For UK residents, acts outside the United Kingdom have to constitute an offence in the country where they are committed, in order to be prosecuted in England and Wales.

=== Other provisions ===
The act also now includes provisions against sex tourism. People who travel abroad with the intent to commit sexual offences can have their passports revoked or travel restricted.

Group homosexual sex has been decriminalised, in that schedule 6 of the 2003 act caused section 12 of the Sexual Offences Act 1956 to be omitted, removing the offence of homosexual sex "when more than two persons take part or are present".

Part II of the act also consolidated the provisions of the Sex Offenders Act 1997 on registration of sex offenders and protective orders. These provisions generally apply throughout the United Kingdom.

Section 45(2) changed the definition of "child" in the Protection of Children Act 1978 (which applies to child pornography) from a person under 16 to a person under 18. Section 45 also inserted section 1A of the 1978 act, and section 160A of the Criminal Justice Act 1988, which create defences which apply where the photograph showed the child alone or with the defendant (but not if it showed any other person), the defendant proves that the photograph was of the child aged 16 or over and that he and the child were married or lived together as partners in an enduring family relationship, and certain other conditions are met.

The Sexual Offences Act 2003 creates further offences relating to prostitution.

- Sections 47 to 50 prohibit child prostitution.
- Sections 52 and 53 prohibit pimping for financial gain.
- Sections 57 to 59 create offences relating to sex trafficking.
- Section 71 creates a specific gender-neutral offence of sexual activity in public toilets. It repealed some of the predecessor offences, such as loitering or soliciting in public toiles, and gross indecency between men.
- The Act also inserted a new section 33A into the Sexual Offences Act 1956, which relates to brothels.

A new section 51A was inserted by the Policing and Crime Act 2009, which prohibits soliciting. This came into effect on 1 April 2010.

== Criticisms ==
The act has faced criticism on several grounds.

=== Consent ===
The definition of consent has caused some academics to raise concerns about the way consent is interpreted. Writing in The Journal of Criminal Law, Bethany Simpson of Northumbria University has suggested that the terms "freedom" and "choice" used to define consent are too complex for the courts to apply.

=== Underage persons ===
One of the more controversial parts of the act involves the criminalising of various common behaviours, such as laws which, on the face of it, outlaw consensual "sexual hugging" in public places or by underage persons, even when both participants are under age, followed by the issue of guidance notes which countermand this, saying they should almost never be prosecuted.

The Home Office stated that legalising consensual sexual activity between children "would damage a fundamental plank in our raft of child protection measures". A spokesman said, "We are not prepared to do this. We accept that genuinely mutually agreed, non-exploitative sexual activity between teenagers does take place and in many instances no harm comes from it. We are putting safeguards in place to ensure that these cases, which are not in the public interest, are not prosecuted – by amending guidance to the police and Crown Prosecution Service."

Criticism came from Action on Rights for Children: "Laws should mean what they say. It's astonishing that the government could consider legislation with the prior intent of issuing guidance to countermand it. I worry about the message it sends to young people – it seems to say that sometimes the law means what it says and sometimes it doesn't."

Professor Nicola Lacey of the London School of Economics commented: "What the Home Office would say was that they wanted to use the criminal law for symbolic impact, to say that it's not a good thing for kids to be having sex. My counter-argument is that the criminal law is too dangerous a tool to be used for symbolic purposes. With this on the statute book, it will give police and prosecutors a lot of discretion. It could be used as a way of controlling kids who perhaps the police want to control for other reasons. Kids who perhaps are a nuisance or who belong to a group who attract the attention of the police in some way."

=== Lack of transitional provisions ===
The 2003 act repealed most sections of the Sexual Offences Act 1956 and several other statutes dealing with sexual offences. Section 141 of the act gave the Home Secretary the power to make rules by statutory instrument to deal with the transition from the old to the new laws, to cover the situation where a defendant is charged with offences which overlap the commencement date of 1 May 2004. However no such "transitional provisions" were ever made.

This created problems when prosecuting cases where it was unknown whether the offence was committed before or after the commencement date. The Court of Appeal first dealt with this problem in December 2005, when the prosecution appealed against the decision of a judge to order a jury to acquit a defendant due to a lack of transitional provisions. Dismissing the appeal, Lord Justice Rose said: "If a history of criminal legislation ever comes to be written it is unlikely that 2003 will be identified as a year of exemplary skill in the annals of Parliamentary drafting."

This situation was not resolved until Parliament passed section 55 of the Violent Crime Reduction Act 2006, which came into force in February 2007.

=== Gendered definition of rape ===
Under the act's definition of rape (penetration of the "mouth, anus or vagina with [the defendant's] penis"), only a biological male can be charged with rape. Section 79 of the act expands this to include transgender individuals who have received masculinizing surgery to give them a penis. A woman who forces a man or woman to have sexual intercourse with her against their will could only be charged, under Section 4 of the act, with "causing a person to engage in sexual activity without consent". Rape is an indictable offence while Section 4 offences are either way offences. However, a Section 4 offence is indictable and subject to the same penalty as rape if it involves "penetration of [the victim's] anus or vagina, penetration of [the victim's] mouth with a person's penis, [or] penetration of a person’s anus or vagina with a part of [the victim's] body".

There have been calls for the act to be amended to include female-perpetrated rape within the definition of rape. In September 2016, the Government responded to a petition requesting that the legal definition of rape be changed to include female-on-male assaults: "There was a considerable amount of agreement that rape should remain an offence of penile penetration. We therefore have no plans to amend the legal definition of rape."

== Extent and repeals ==
The act applies to England and Wales only, except for the provisions listed in s.142(2) of the act which also apply to Northern Ireland and the provisions listed in s.142(3) of the act which also apply to Scotland. The act repealed the Sex Offenders Act 1997 in its entirety, and almost all of the Sexual Offences Act 1956, which until then had been the main legislation for sexual offences. It also repealed much of the Sexual Offences Act 1967 which had discriminated heavily against homosexual and bisexual men, leaving it largely gutted of statutory effect.

== Amendments ==
The Voyeurism (Offences) Act 2019 amended the Sexual Offences Act 2003 to make upskirting a specific offence in England and Wales.

The Online Safety Act 2023 added two new offences to the Sexual Offences Act: sending images of a person's genitals (cyberflashing), or sharing or threatening to share intimate images.

The Data (Use and Access) Act 2025 added offences against the creation, or the request for creation, of intimate images of another person who has not consented to this, for example by using Generative AI.

== See also ==
- Sexual Offences Act
- Sexual offences in the United Kingdom
- Violent and Sex Offender Register
- Optional Protocol to the Convention on the Rights of the Child on the Sale of Children, Child Prostitution and Child Pornography
- Operation Cathedral
- Bolton 7

== Bibliography ==
- Kim Stevenson, Anne Davies, and Michael Gunn, Blackstone's Guide to the Sexual Offences Act 2003 (OUP 2003)
- Guidance on part 2 of the Sexual Offences Act 2003
