= Sexual Offences Act 1956 =

Act of the Parliament of the United Kingdom

Sexual Offences Act 1956 (Note: Section 55.)
- Act of Parliament
- Parliament of the United Kingdom
- Long title: An Act to consolidate (with corrections and improvements made under the Consolidation of Enactments (Procedure) Act, 1949) the statute law of England and Wales relating to sexual crimes, to the abduction, procuration and prostitution of women and to kindred offences, and to make such adaptations of statutes extending beyond England and Wales as are needed in consequence of that consolidation.
- Citation: 4 & 5 Eliz. 2. c. 69
- Territorial extent: England and Wales; Northern Ireland (section 50); (Note: Section 54.)

Dates
- Royal assent: 2 August 1956
- Commencement: 1 January 1957 (Note: Section 56.)
- Repealed: mostly 1 May 2004
Other legislation
Amends	Extradition Act 1873; Children and Young Persons Act 1933; Firearms Act 1937; Administration of Justice (Miscellaneous Provisions) Act 1938; Magistrates' Courts Act 1952; Visiting Forces Act 1952; See § Repealed enactments
Repeals/revokes	See § Repealed enactments
Amended by	Mental Health Act 1959; Indecency with Children Act 1960; Children and Young Persons Act 1963; Criminal Law Act 1967; Sexual Offences Act 1967; Firearms Act 1968; Family Law Reform Act 1969; Children and Young Persons Act 1969; Courts Act 1971; Northern Ireland Constitution Act 1973; Statute Law (Repeals) Act 1974; Sexual Offences (Scotland) Act 1976; Criminal Law Act 1977; Magistrates' Courts Act 1980; Criminal Attempts Act 1981; Police and Criminal Evidence Act 1984; Sexual Offences Act 1985; Extradition Act 1989; Children Act 1989; Local Government and Housing Act 1989; Statute Law (Repeals) Act 1993; Criminal Justice and Public Order Act 1994; Sexual Offences (Amendment) Act 2000; Sexual Offences Act 2003; Statute Law (Repeals) Act 2008; Renting Homes (Wales) Act 2016 (Consequential Amendments) Regulations 2022
Repealed by	Sexual Offences Act 2003
Relates to	Consolidation of Enactments (Procedure) Act 1949

Status: Partially repealed

Text of statute as originally enacted

Revised text of statute as amended

Text of the Sexual Offences Act 1956 as in force today (including any amendments) within the United Kingdom, from legislation.gov.uk.

The Sexual Offences Act 1956 (4 & 5 Eliz. 2. c. 69) is an act of the Parliament of the United Kingdom that consolidated the English criminal law relating to sexual offences between 1957 and 2004. It was mostly repealed (from 1 May 2004) by the Sexual Offences Act 2003 which replaced it, but sections 33 to 37 still survive. The 2003 act also added a new section 33A. These sections create offences to deal with brothels.

Although the rest of the act has been repealed, the repealed sections still apply to sex crimes committed before the repeal, such as in the Pitcairn sexual assault trial of 2004.

== The act today ==
Sections 33, 34, 35 and 36 create summary offences. Section 33A creates an aggravated version of the offence in section 33, and is an indictable offence. Section 37 prescribes the penalties.

=== Sections 33 and 33A ===
Section 33 reads:

It is an offence for a person to keep a brothel, or to manage, or act or assist in the management of, a brothel.

Section 33A reads:

(1) It is an offence for a person to keep, or to manage, or act or assist in the management of, a brothel to which people resort for practices involving prostitution (whether or not also for other practices).
(2) In this section “prostitution” has the meaning given by section 51(2) of the Sexual Offences Act 2003.

The difference between these offences arises because the definition of a brothel in English law does not require that the premises are used for the purposes of prostitution, since a brothel exists wherever more than one person offers sexual contact, whether for payment or not.

"Prostitution" is defined by section 51(2) of the Sexual Offences Act 2003 as follows:

In those sections “prostitute” means a person (A) who, on at least one occasion and whether or not compelled to do so, offers or provides sexual services to another person in return for payment or a promise of payment to A or a third person; and “prostitution” is to be interpreted accordingly.

"Payment" is defined by section 51(3):

In subsection (2), “payment” means any financial advantage, including the discharge of an obligation to pay or the provision of goods or services (including sexual services) gratuitously or at a discount.

=== Section 34 ===
It is an offence for the lessor or landlord of any premises or his agent to let the whole or part of the premises with the knowledge that it is to be used, in whole or in part, as a brothel, or, where the whole or part of the premises is used as a brothel, to be wilfully a party to that use continuing.

=== Section 35(1) ===
It is an offence for the tenant or occupier, or person in charge, of any premises knowingly to permit the whole or part of the premises to be used as a brothel.

=== Section 36 ===
It is an offence for the tenant or occupier of any premises knowingly to permit the whole or part of the premises to be used for the purposes of habitual prostitution.

=== Penalties ===
Section 37 gives effect to Schedule 2 to the act, which sets out the penalties for the above offences. For sections 33, 34, 35 and 36 the penalty is imprisonment for three months for a first offence, or six months "for an offence committed after a previous conviction" for any of those offences.

The maximum sentence for the offence under section 33A is six months in a magistrates' court, or seven years in the Crown Court.

== Succeeding Sexual Offences Acts ==
- The Street Offences Act 1959 prohibited soliciting "in a street or public place for the purpose of prostitution."
- The Sexual Offences Act 1985 prohibited kerb crawling and persistently soliciting women for the purposes of prostitution.
- The Sexual Offences Act 2003 inserted section 33A into the 1956 Act, and created further offences relating to prostitution:
  - Sections 47 to 50 prohibit child prostitution.
  - Sections 52 and 53 prohibit pimping for financial gain.
  - Sections 57 to 59 create offences relating to sex trafficking.

== See also ==
- Sexual Offences Act
- Prostitution in the United Kingdom
- Transition from 1956 to 2003 laws
