= LGBTQ rights in Scotland =

- Scotland (dark green) within the United Kingdom (light green)
- Legal status: Legal since 1981, age of consent equalised in 2001
- Gender identity: Right to change legal gender since 2004
- Military: LGBTQ people allowed to serve openly since 2000
- Discrimination protections: Sexual orientation and gender identity protections

Family rights
- Recognition of relationships: Civil partnerships since 2005; Same-sex marriage since 2014
- Adoption: Full adoption rights since 2009

Lesbian, gay, bisexual, transgender and queer (LGBTQ) rights in Scotland are generally in line with the rest of the United Kingdom, which have evolved extensively over time and are now regarded as some of the most progressive in Europe. In both 2015 and 2016, Scotland was recognised as the "best country in Europe for LGBTI legal equality".

Same-sex sexual activity has been legal since 1981 and the age of consent has been equal to that for opposite-sex activity since 2001, at 16. A same-sex marriage law was approved by the Scottish Parliament in February 2014 and received royal assent on 12 March 2014. It came into effect on 16 December 2014 with many civil partners converting their relationships into marriages, while the first same-sex marriage ceremonies occurred on 31 December 2014. Civil partnerships for same-sex couples have been legal since 2005. Same-sex couples have also been granted joint and stepchild adoption rights since 2009 and discrimination on the basis of sexual orientation and gender identity has been banned since 2010.

== Census data and statistics ==
In June 2024 there were almost 184,000 individuals (just over 4%) who identified as LGBT within Scotland by census data and statistics. Just over 8% refused to answer the sexual orientation question; answering it was not mandatory.

== Laws regarding same-sex sexual activity ==
The historical legal situation for male homosexuality was severe: "The common law crime of sodomy does not involve the establishment of the absence of consent on the part of the passive agent or catamite. It reflects a former general disapproval of homosexuality and both parties are guilty of the offence". Recorded punishments are limited compared to purges such as the Utrecht sodomy trials of 1730, whether due to lack of offending, prosecution or surviving documentation. Baron Hume wrote that "the crime is only mentioned twice in the course of our records", citing a double prosecution in 1570 and a single prosecution in 1630, with bestiality more often noted, all cases being punished by death. A legal text dated 1832 added a then recent case in which a man, on confession to two acts of sodomy out of nine initially charged, was transported for life. However, another archive source documents an additional sample mention, the commission for the trial of Gavin Bell in 1645.

In 1889 Scotland became the last jurisdiction in Europe to abolish the death penalty for same-sex sexual intercourse, which reduced the penalty to life imprisonment in a penitentiary.

The United Kingdom Parliament voted to pass the Sexual Offences Act 1967 for the limited decriminalisation of homosexual acts in only England and Wales. Homosexual activities were legalised in Scotland — on the same basis as that which was used for the 1967 Act – by Section 80 of the Criminal Justice (Scotland) Act 1980 (Scottish Gaelic: Achd Ceartas Eucoirean (Alba) 1980), which came into force on 1 February 1981. Section 2A, the legislation that prevented the promotion of homosexuality, was repealed in Scotland within the first two years of the existence of the Scottish Parliament by the Ethical Standards in Public Life etc. (Scotland) Act 2000.

In June 2018 the Scottish Parliament passed the Historical Sexual Offences (Pardons and Disregards) (Scotland) Act 2018, a law which issued a formal pardon to men, living and dead, convicted of having consensual sex with other men before it was decriminalised. Though the pardons are purely symbolic, the law also allows for anyone with a historical conviction for same-sex sexual activity to apply for a formal "disregard". If an application for a disregard is accepted by the relevant minister, this prevents the information from being included in disclosure checks and treats the offence as having not occurred. The law went into effect in October 2019.

== Recognition of same-sex relationships ==
=== Civil partnerships ===
Civil partnerships have been a right of same-sex couples in Scotland to access since 2005, when the UK Parliament passed the Civil Partnership Act 2004. The Act gives same-sex couples most of the rights and responsibilities of civil marriage. Civil partners are entitled to the same property rights as married opposite-sex couples, the same exemption as married couples on inheritance tax, social security and pension benefits, and also the ability to get parental responsibility for a partner's children, as well as responsibility for reasonable maintenance of one's partner and their children, tenancy rights, full life insurance recognition, next of kin rights in hospitals, and others. There is a formal process for dissolving partnerships akin to divorce.

Since November 2015, civil partnerships originating elsewhere in the United Kingdom other than Scotland (including Northern Ireland) can be converted to a marriage without the couple being forced to dissolve the civil partnership.

Civil partnerships have been available for opposite-sex since June 2021, after the Scottish Parliament passed amending legislation to that effect in September 2019.

=== Same-sex marriage ===
Same-sex marriage has been legal in Scotland since 16 December 2014, with the first same-sex marriages occurring on 31 December 2014. The law provides that religious organisations and individual celebrants are under no obligation to perform marriage ceremonies for same-sex couples, though religious organisations are permitted to authorise their clergy to do so.

On 25 July 2012 the Scottish Government announced that it would legalise same-sex marriage. The move was announced despite opposition by the Church of Scotland and the Catholic Church in Scotland. Although Deputy First Minister Nicola Sturgeon announced the move as the "right thing to do", she reassured churches that they would not be forced to perform same-sex marriages. During the consultation phase, ministers received over 19,000 messages from constituents about the issue.

On 27 June 2013 the Scottish Government introduced same-sex marriage legislation in the Scottish Parliament.

On 4 February 2014 the Scottish Parliament held its final reading on the bill to permit same-sex marriages. The bill passed by a vote of 108–15 and received royal assent on 12 March 2014. The Marriage and Civil Partnerships (Scotland) Act 2014 (Scottish Gaelic: Achd Pòsaidh is Com-pàirteachasan Sìobhalta (Alba) 2014) allows religious and faith organisations to be exempted from having to conduct or be involved in same-sex marriages if it contravenes their beliefs. The first same-sex weddings occurred on 31 December 2014, though civil partnerships could be exchanged for marriage certificates from 16 December 2014 so the very first same-sex marriages under Scottish law were recognised that day.

In June 2017 the Scottish Episcopal Church approved of same-sex marriage within Church canon law. In May 2022, the General Assembly of the Church of Scotland voted 274 to 136 to approve same-sex marriages.

== Adoption and parenting rights ==
On 28 September 2009, legislation allowing same-sex couples to adopt children in Scotland came into force. At the same time, the Looked After Children (Scotland) Regulations 2009 came into effect, which allows same-sex couples to be considered as foster parents on the same basis as anyone else.

The legal position regarding co-parenting arrangements where a gay man/couple donates sperm to a lesbian couple is complex. Following the changes implemented by the Human Fertilisation and Embryology Act 2008, lesbian couples who conceive with donated sperm are likely to be treated as both being the parents of their child. If the lesbian couple a man is donating to are civil partners/married, the father's status will be automatically excluded. If the lesbian couple he is donating to are not civil partners/married, the mothers may be able to choose whether they wish the child's second parent to be the father or the non-birth mother.

Altruistic surrogacy is legal in the United Kingdom, including Scotland. The law supports gay fathers conceiving through surrogacy in the UK in the same way as it does heterosexual couples and allows for applications to the relevant court, for such parents who wish to be named on their child's birth certificate as the legal parents/guardians of the child.

== Discrimination protections ==
The passage of the Equality Act 2010 (Scottish Gaelic: Achd na Co-ionannachd 2010) by the Parliament of the United Kingdom directly impacted on Scotland. Since implementation, the Act has covered gender reassignment, marriage and civil partnership, sex, and sexual orientation among a host of other attributes. The Act outlaws discrimination, harassment and victimisation of another person because they belong to a group that the Act protects, are thought to belong to one of those groups or are associated with someone who does.

In 2009, Scotland enacted legislation providing for penalty enhancements if the commission of a crime is motivated by the victim's sexual orientation or gender identity.

== Gender identity and expression ==
Under the Gender Recognition Act 2004, transgender people in Scotland may change their legal gender.

In 2018 the Scottish Government announced plans to start providing an "X" sex descriptor on identity documents, as well as lowering the minimum age of transition to 16.

In September 2021 Sturgeon announced that a bill was being planned to reform the Gender Recognition Act 2004. In March 2022, the bill was formally introduced to the Scottish Parliament that to "reform, innovate and revitalise" the 2004 UK gender recognition laws in Scotland after the UK government decided not to reform the UK-wide Gender Recognition Act 2004. Scotland has the authority or power to pass certain laws "on certain subjects", despite still being possibly overruled by UK legislation as a whole.

In December 2022 the Gender Recognition Reform (Scotland) Bill passed within the Scottish Parliament by a vote of 86–39. The legislation applies only to Scotland and is awaiting royal assent. The legislation was overruled by the UK government under section 35 of the Scotland Act 1998, the first time that this option had been used to overturn legislation passed by Scotland.

== Hate crime laws ==
In April 2020 a hate crimes bill was introduced in the Scottish Parliament that would explicitly include sexual orientation and gender identity and has raised the possibility of "deep legal serious concerns and unintended consequences", discussed by all political sides, all religious groups and ministers, comedians, actors, and the Scotland law society about constitutional freedom of speech, freedom of religion, freedom of expression, freedom of thought, the fundamental principle of being equal before the law, and freedom of assembly conventions dating way back to the Magna Carta. 11 months later in March 2021, the hate crimes bill passed by a vote of 82–32 on the third and final reading, and received royal assent one month later. The revised hate crime legislation went into effect on 1 April 2024.

== Sex education ==
The Scottish National Party's 2016 manifesto supports sex education classes, as well as "equality training" for teachers, that would cover LGBT issues. In November 2018, the Scottish Government announced the implementation of LGBT-inclusive education in the Scottish school curriculum. The move was welcomed by LGBT activists who cited studies that have found that about 9 in 10 LGBT Scots experience homophobia at school, and 27% reported they had attempted suicide after being bullied.

In July 2020 it was reported that Scotland became the first country in the world to have an LGBT history and education curriculum. The LGBT curriculum within schools across Scotland officially started in October 2021.

== Living conditions ==
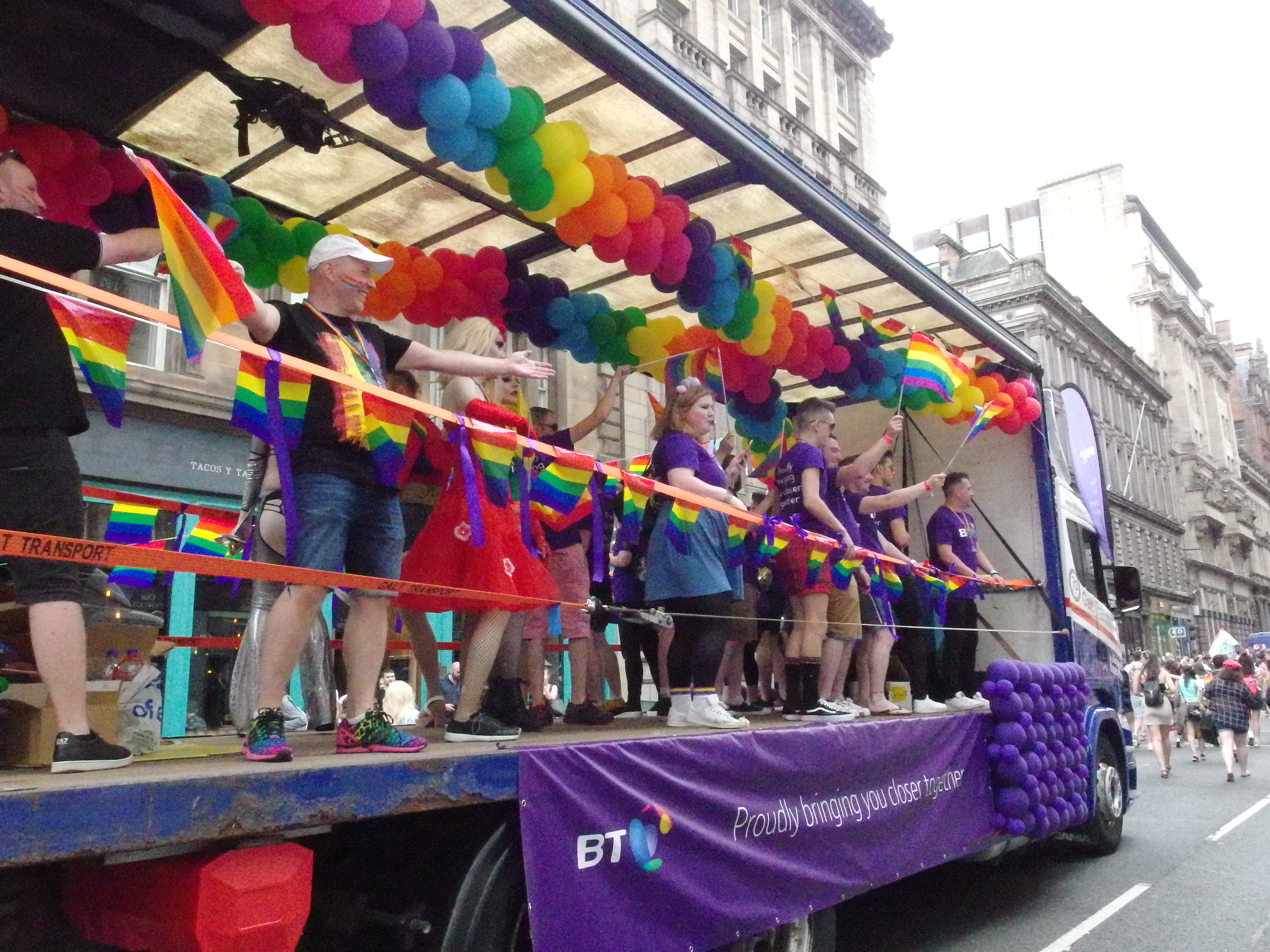
Participants at the 2018 Glasgow Pride parade

Attitudes towards members of the LGBT community have changed drastically in Scotland in just a few decades. In the 1980s, the climate was one of extreme homophobia, hostility and public antipathy. In these times, LGBT individuals would either stay in the closet, move to England or commit suicide. Despite homophobic opinions and rhetoric being widespread and mainstream, small LGBT groups began to organise politically and socially, calling among others for the repeal of Section 2A, which banned the "promotion of homosexuality", and which was eventually repealed in 2000 despite an organised and a powerful opposition. By the early 2000s, attitudes became increasingly more accepting. In 2004, legislation allowing transgender people to change their legal gender was enacted. Civil partnerships were legalised in 2005, followed by adoption in 2009 and same-sex marriage in 2014. Nowadays, Scotland is regarded as "one of the most LGBT-friendly countries in the world". Dubbed by the media as "a seismic shift", societal acceptance of same-sex relationships and LGBT people has increased tremendously. According to the Scottish Social Attitudes (SSA), about 29% of Scottish people in 2000 held the view that "same-sex relationships are not wrong at all". In 2015, 59% held that view. A 2014 opinion poll published by the SSA showed that 68% of Scottish people supported same-sex marriage, while 17% opposed. Support was higher among young people (83%) than among people over 65 (44%), higher among women (72%) than men (63%), and higher among atheists or irreligious people (81%) than among Catholics (60%) or Church of Scotland adherents (59%).

In 2016 the majority of Scotland's major political parties were led by openly LGBT people: the Scottish Conservatives by Ruth Davidson, the Scottish Labour Party by Kezia Dugdale, the Scottish Green Party by Patrick Harvie, and the Scottish branch of the UK Independence Party by David Coburn.

Glasgow and Edinburgh have visible LGBT scenes, with many gay bars, clubs, pubs and restaurants. Though smaller, Aberdeen, Stirling and Dundee also host a variety of LGBT venues and events. Pride Glasgow, an annual pride march held in the summer, is the largest LGBT event in Scotland, with an attendance of usually about 50,000 people. Edinburgh's Pride Scotia takes place annually in June, and includes a pride march, a BBQ and a community fair. As of 2018, many other Scottish Pride events have been launched including Perthshire Pride in Perth, Hebridean Pride, Proud Ness, Fife Pride, Bute Pride in Rothesay, Dundee Pride, West Lothian Pride, Grampian Pride in Aberdeen, and Dumfries and Galloway Pride.

== Summary table ==
| Same-sex sexual activity legal | Yes (Since 1981) |
| Equal age of consent (16) | Yes (Since 2001) |
| Anti-discrimination laws in employment | Yes (Since 2010) |
| Anti-discrimination laws in the provision of goods and services | Yes (Since 2010) |
| Anti-discrimination laws in all other areas (incl. indirect discrimination, hate speech) | Yes (Since 2010) |
| Anti-discrimination laws concerning gender identity | Yes (Since 2010) |
| Hate crime laws explicitly includes both sexual orientation and gender identity | Yes (Since 2024) |
| Civil partnership implemented | Yes (Since 2005) |
| Same-sex marriage implemented | Yes (Since 2014) |
| Stepchild and joint adoption by same-sex couples implemented | Yes (Since 2009) |
| LGBT people allowed to serve in the military | Yes (Since 2000 - UK wide) |
| Right to change legal gender | Yes (Since 2005 - UK wide) |
| Gender self-identification | No |
| Legal recognition of non-binary gender | No |
| IVF access and automatic parentage on birth certificates for children of same-sex couples | Yes (Since 2009) |
| Conversion therapy outlawed | No (Proposed in 2022, plans dropped in 2025) |
| LGBT inclusive education in schools | Yes (Since 2018) |
| Expungement scheme or pardon law implemented | Yes (Since 2019) |
| Commercial surrogacy for gay male couples | No (Banned for heterosexual couples as well) |
| MSMs allowed to donate blood | Yes Since 2021 without deferral period with conditions (such as being monogamous). |
| Legal recognition of intersex people | No |
| Intersex human rights | No |

== See also ==
- Equality Network
- Intersex rights in the United Kingdom
- LGBT Network
- LGBTQ rights by country or territory
- LGBTQ rights in Europe
- LGBTQ rights in the United Kingdom
- LGBTQ rights in Northern Ireland
- LGBTQ rights in Wales
- Transgender rights in the United Kingdom
- Same-sex marriage in Scotland
