= Same-sex adoption in Europe =

Child adoption by the European LGBTQ community

Legal status of adoption by same-sex couples in Europe: Joint adoption legal Stepparent adoption legal No laws allowing adoption by same-sex couples

Adoption by LGBTQ people in Europe differs in legal recognition from country to country. Full joint adoption or step-child adoption or both is legal in 23 of the 56 European countries, and in all dependent territories.

Full joint adoption by same-sex couples is legal in 23 European countries, namely Andorra, Austria, Belgium, Croatia, Denmark, Estonia, Finland, France, Germany, Greece, Iceland, Ireland, Liechtenstein, Luxembourg, Malta, the Netherlands, Norway, Portugal, Slovenia, Spain, Sweden, Switzerland, and the United Kingdom. San Marino and the Czech Republic permit step-child adoption, i.e. a registered partner can adopt the biological and, in some cases, the adopted child of their partner. In Italy stepchild adoption has been recognized by courts since 2016 after the Supreme Court of Cassation stated that a couple in a civil union can adopt their partner's child.

In dependent territories, joint adoption by same-sex couples is legal in Saint Helena, Ascension and Tristan da Cunha, Cayman Islands, Gibraltar, Falkland Islands, Guernsey, Greenland, the Faroe Islands, the Isle of Man and Jersey. Several countries are currently considering permitting full joint or step-child adoption by same-sex couples.

== Current situation ==
=== Joint adoption ===
| Jurisdiction | Entry into force | Notes |
|---|---|---|
| Andorra | 25 December 2014 | |
| Austria | 1 January 2016 | |
| Belgium | 30 June 2006 | |
| Croatia | 26 May 2022 | First instance decision 5 May 2021, 26 May 2022 High Administrative Court rejects Ministry appeal. |
| Denmark | 1 July 2010 | Also in effect in the Faroe Islands (since 1 July 2017) and Greenland (since 1 July 2016) |
| Estonia | 1 January 2024 | Only parties to a cohabitation agreement or marriage may adopt |
| Finland | 1 March 2017 | |
| France | 18 May 2013 | Also applies to all French overseas territories |
| Germany | 1 October 2017 | |
| Greece | 16 February 2024 | |
| Iceland | 27 June 2006 | |
| (Republic of Ireland) Ireland | 6 May 2016 | |
| Liechtenstein | 1 June 2023 | |
| Luxembourg | 1 January 2015 | |
| Malta | 17 April 2014 | |
| Netherlands | 1 April 2001 | The law initially applied to the European Netherlands only.; In 2012 its scope was expanded to include the Caribbean Netherlands. |
| Norway | 1 January 2009 | |
| Portugal | 1 March 2016 | |
| Slovenia | 8 July 2022 | The Ministry of Labour, Family and Social Affairs stated that the existing law allowed for second-parent adoption beginning in July 2011.; In 2022, the Constitutional Court made separate rulings legalising same-sex marriage and joint couple adoption. |
| Spain | 3 July 2005 | |
| Sweden | 1 February 2003 | |
| Switzerland | 1 July 2022 | |
| United Kingdom | 7 November 2002 | The law initially applied to England and Wales only.; In Scotland a separate law came into force on 28 September 2009.; In Northern Ireland since 11 December 2013; In Isle of Man since 2 April 2011; In Jersey since 2 April 2012; In Gibraltar since 28 March 2014; In Guernsey since 3 April 2017; Non-European Territories: In both Bermuda and the Pitcairn Islands since 2015.; In the Falkland Islands, Saint Helena, Ascension Island, and Tristan da Cunha since 2017.; The Cayman Islands since 2020.; Not available in other overseas territories |

=== Step-child adoption ===
| Jurisdiction | Entry into force | Notes |
|---|---|---|
| Czech Republic | 1 January 2025 | |
| Italy | case law since 2016 | Can be granted by court order. |
| Lithuania | case law since 2024 | Can be granted by court order. |
| San Marino | 11 February 2019 | Parties in a civil union may adopt stepchildren only |

== Public opinion ==
According to pollster Gallup Europe, women, younger generations, and the highly educated are more likely to support same-sex marriage and adoption rights for gay people than other demographics.

Indicates the country/territory has legalized same-sex adoption nationwide
Indicates that same-sex adoption is legal in certain parts of the country
Indicates that the country has step-child adoption or partner-guardianship

Opinion polls for same-sex adoption in Europe
| Country | Pollster | Year | For | Against | Don't know/neutral/no answer/other |
|---|---|---|---|---|---|
| Austria | Eurobarometer | 2023 | 65% | 30% | 5% |
| Belgium | Ipsos | 2021 | 72% | 21% | 7% |
| Bulgaria | Eurobarometer | 2006 | 12% | 68% | 20% |
| Croatia | Promocija Plus | 2025 | 28% | 52% | 20% |
| Cyprus | Eurobarometer | 2006 | 10% | 86% | 4% |
| Czech Republic | CVVM | 2019 | 47% | 47% | 6% |
| Denmark | Pew Research Center | 2017 | 75% | - | - |
| Estonia | HumanrightsEE | 2023 | 47% | 44% | 9% |
| Finland | Taloustutkimus | 2013 | 51% | 42% | 7% |
| France | Ipsos | 2021 | 62% | 29% | 10% |
| Germany | Ipsos | 2021 | 69% | 24% | 6% |
| Greece | KAPA Research | 2023 | 53% | 41% | 6% |
| Hungary | Ipsos | 2021 | 59% | 36% | 5% |
| Ireland | Red C Poll | 2011 | 60% | - | - |
| Italy | Eurispes | 2023 | 50.4% | 49.6% | 0% |
| Latvia | SKDS | 2023 | 27% | 23% | 46% |
| Lithuania | Eurobarometer | 2006 | 12% | 82% | 6% |
| Luxembourg | Politmonitor | 2013 | 55% | 44% | 1% |
| Malta | Misco | 2014 | 20% | 80% | - |
| Netherlands | Ipsos | 2021 | 83% | 12% | 5% |
| Norway | YouGov | 2012 | 54% | 34% | 12% |
| Poland | Ipsos | 2021 | 33% | 58% | 10% |
| Portugal | Pew Research Center | 2017 | 59% | 28% | 13% |
| Romania | Eurobarometer | 2006 | 8% | 82% | 10% |
| Russia | Ipsos | 2021 | 23% | 67% | 10% |
| Serbia | Civil Rights Defenders | 2020 | 22.5% | - | - |
| Slovakia | Eurobarometer | 2006 | 12% | 84% | 4% |
| Slovenia | Delo Stik | 2015 | 38% | 55% | 7% |
| Spain | Ipsos | 2021 | 77% | 17% | 6% |
| Sweden | Ipsos | 2021 | 79% | 17% | 4% |
| Switzerland | Pink Cross | 2020 | 67% | 30% | 3% |
| Ukraine | Kyiv International Institute of Sociology | 2023 | 30% | 48% | 22% |
| United Kingdom | Ipsos | 2021 | 72% | 19% | 9% |

== Court cases about same-sex adoption ==
=== V.M.A. vs Sofia municipality, Pancharevo district, Bulgaria ===
On 15 April 2021, the European Court of Justice found that a member state is required to grant citizenship to the child of a same-sex couple regardless of the legality of same-sex marriages in that state. A married lesbian couple was living in Spain when they had their first child in December 2019. One woman had Bulgarian citizenship, and the other had British. The Spanish birth certificate designated one mother as “Mother A” and the other as “Mother.” When the Bulgarian woman applied for citizenship for her daughter in Bulgaria, she was denied because Bulgaria does not recognize same-sex unions and registrations. Article 46 of the Bulgarian Constitution reads, “Marriage is a voluntary union between a man and a woman,” hence not allowing for same-sex relationships. However, it was unclear whether their status as a same-sex couple should interfere with the citizenship of their child. The European Court of Justice found that despite Bulgaria's constitutional objection to homosexual marriages, they could not deny the child their Bulgarian nationality, regardless of whether the child was the legal or biological child of the applicant. Therefore, the child was issued a Bulgarian birth certificate and granted citizenship to Bulgaria. The couple was protected by Article 21 of the Treaty on the Functioning of the European Union, which ensures members’ rights to move freely between countries. The Bulgarian woman's new residence in Spain did not destroy her child's right to Bulgarian citizenship.

=== Gas and Dubois vs France ===
Two French women who had been living together since 1989 joined a civil partnership agreement in 2002. In 2000, one of the women traveled to Belgium for an artificial insemination treatment. Upon birth, only the biological mother was granted parental custody of the child. The other mother applied for a simple adoption in order to obtain joint parental custody and was denied. Article 365 of the French Civil Code clarifies that a simple adoption is available to married couples specifically, but Article 144 prohibited same-sex marriage. Therefore, they could not achieve the legal status required for simple adoption. The women appealed to the European Court of Human Rights, claiming that they were discriminated against based on sexual orientation, claiming that their right to a private family life (Article 8 of the European Convention of Human Rights) and their right to equity under the law (Article 14) had been violated. The court held in a 6-1 decision that the women had experienced no legal violation of Articles 8 and 14, so no simple adoption for joint custody would be allowed.

== See also ==
- LGBTQ rights in Europe
- LGBTQ rights in the European Union
- LGBTQ adoption
- LGBTQ parenting
- Adoption
- Recognition of same-sex unions in Europe
