= LGBTQ rights in the United Kingdom =

- Location of the United Kingdom
- Legal status: Homosexuality always legal for women; decriminalised for men in: 1967 (England and Wales); 1981 (Scotland); 1982 (Northern Ireland); Age of consent equalised in 2001
- Gender identity: Ability to apply to change legal gender since 2005 (limited recognition since 2025)
- Military: Allowed to serve openly since 2000
- Discrimination protections: Sexual orientation and gender identity protections since 2010

Family rights
- Recognition of relationships: Same-sex marriage since 2014 (England and Wales; Scotland); Same-sex marriage in Northern Ireland since 2020; Civil partnerships since 2005 (nationwide)
- Adoption: Full adoption rights since 2005 (England and Wales); 2009 (Scotland); 2013 (Northern Ireland)

Pink Union Jack pride flag

The rights of lesbian, gay, bisexual, transgender, and queer (LGBTQ) people in the United Kingdom have developed significantly over time. Today, lesbian, gay and bisexual rights are considered to be advanced by international standards. However, evaluations from ILGA-Europe have indicated significant backsliding, with the UK receiving the highest score in Europe in the organisation's 2015 report on LGBTI rights, before falling to 22nd place in the 2025 report. In particular, anti-trans rhetoric in UK media has been described as "increasing and becoming more vitriolic" since 2016 and becoming "super-charged" since 2018.

At the time of the initial formation of the UK in 1707, Christian teaching condemned same-sex male sexual activity as "sinful" and the 1533 Buggery Act made male anal sex a civil offence punishable by death in England and Wales while sodomy was punishable by death in Scotland. LGBT rights first came to prominence following the decriminalisation of sexual activity between men in 1967 in England and Wales, and later in Scotland and Northern Ireland. Sexual activity between women was never subject to the same legal restriction.

Since the turn of the 21st century, LGBTQ rights have increasingly strengthened in support. Some discrimination protections have been in place for LGBT people since 1999, but they were then extended to all areas under the Equality Act 2010. A ban on LGBT individuals serving openly in the armed forces was officially lifted in 2016, though a policy of non-enforcement had been in place since 2000. The age of consent was equalised at 16, (Note: This was 17 in Northern Ireland at the time but has since been lowered in line with the rest of the UK.) regardless of sexual orientation, in 2001. Having been introduced in the 1980s, Section 28, which prohibited the "promotion of homosexuality" by schools and local authorities, was repealed in 2003. Transgender people have had the ability to apply to change their legal gender since 2005. The same year, same-sex couples were granted the right to enter into a civil partnership, a similar legal structure to marriage, and also to adopt in England and Wales. Scotland later followed on adoption rights for same-sex couples in 2009, and Northern Ireland in 2013. Same-sex marriage was legalised in England and Wales, and Scotland in 2014, and in Northern Ireland in 2020.

In ILGA-Europe's 2015 review of LGBTI rights, the UK received the highest score in Europe, with 86% progress toward "respect of human rights and full equality" for LGBT people and 92% in Scotland alone. However, by 2020, the UK had dropped to ninth place in the ILGA-Europe rankings with a score of 66% and the executive also expressed concern about a "hostile climate on trans rights fuelled by opposition groups". By 2025, the UK's ranking had fallen further to 22nd place, with a score of 45%, the third steepest drop from 2024 in Europe, behind only Hungary and Georgia. Meanwhile, 86% of the UK agreed that homosexuality should be accepted by society, according to a 2019 Pew Research Center poll, and a 2017 poll showed that 77% of British people support same-sex marriage.

The 2024 survey from the Office for National Statistics found that 4.8% of people in England and Wales identified as lesbian, gay, bisexual, or other. However, YouGov and Stonewall have argued that polling results are likely influenced by under-reporting, and estimate that the actual figure is between 5 and 7%. LGBT rights organisations and very large LGBT communities have been built across the UK, most notably in Brighton, which is widely regarded as the UK's unofficial "gay capital", with other large communities in Blackpool often referred to as the "Gay Capital of the North", Manchester, London, Birmingham, Bristol, Cardiff, Leeds, Liverpool, Newcastle upon Tyne, Edinburgh, Belfast and Southampton which all have gay villages and host annual pride festivals.

== Same-sex sexual activity ==
=== Homosexuality as an offence ===
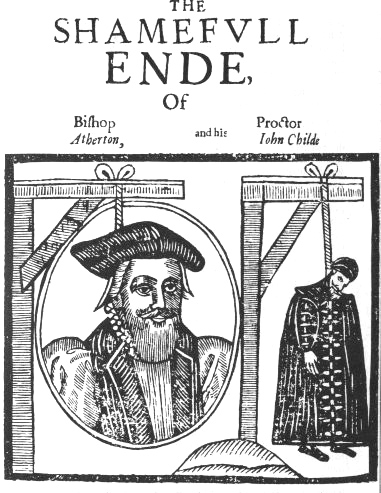
English bishop John Atherton, who helped extend the applicability of the Buggery Act to Ireland, was himself executed under the Act in 1640.

English law identified anal sex as an offence punishable by hanging as a result of the Buggery Act 1533, which Parliament passed in the reign of Henry VIII. The Act was the country's first civil sodomy law, such offences having previously been dealt with by the ecclesiastical courts. While it was repealed in 1553 on the accession of Mary I, it was re-enacted in 1563 under Elizabeth I. James Pratt and John Smith were the last two to be executed for sodomy in 1835.

Although section 61 of the Offences Against the Person Act 1861 removed the death penalty for homosexuality, male homosexual acts remained illegal and were punishable by imprisonment. In 1862, the Indian Penal Code, created by the colonial authorities of the British Raj, came into force. The code included Section 377, which effectively criminalised same-sex activity in India. The Code was used as the basis for law in Britain's other colonies, therefore exporting anti-homosexuality laws throughout the British Empire. Today, anti-homosexuality laws still exist in a total of 34 member states of the Commonwealth of Nations. The Labouchere Amendment, section 11 of the Criminal Law Amendment Act 1885, extended the laws regarding homosexuality to include any homosexual act between males, even when there were no witnesses. This meant that people could be convicted for private acts, and often a letter between two people expressing affection was enough evidence to convict. Oscar Wilde was convicted under this law and sentenced to 2 years of penal labour. Conversely, lesbians were never acknowledged or targeted by legislation.

In Scotland, although there were no statutes making sex between men unlawful between 1424 and 1707, homosexual acts were punishable. One example is the commission for trial of Gavin Bell.

In the early 1950s, the police actively enforced laws prohibiting sexual behaviour between men. By the end of 1954, there were 1,069 homosexual men in prison in England and Wales, with an average age of 37. There were a number of high-profile arrests and trials, including that of scientist, mathematician, and war-time code-breaker Alan Turing, convicted in 1952 of "gross indecency". He accepted treatment with female hormones (chemical castration) as an alternative to prison. Turing committed suicide in 1954. In 2009, then Prime Minister Gordon Brown, in response to a petition, issued an apology on behalf of the British Government for "the appalling way he was treated". In 1954, the trial and eventual imprisonment of Edward Montagu (the 3rd Baron Montagu of Beaulieu), Michael Pitt-Rivers and Peter Wildeblood for committing acts of "homosexual indecency" caused uproar and led to the establishment of a committee to examine and report on the law covering "homosexual offences" appointed by Sir David Maxwell Fyfe and Sir Hugh Lucas-Tooth.

=== Wolfenden ===
The Wolfenden Committee was set up on 24 August 1954 to consider UK law relating to "homosexual offences"; the Report of the Departmental Committee on Homosexual Offences and Prostitution (better known as the Wolfenden report) was published on 3 September 1957. It recommended that "homosexual behaviour between consenting adults in private should no longer be a criminal offence", finding that "homosexuality cannot legitimately be regarded as a disease, because in many cases it is the only symptom and is compatible with full mental health in other respects."

In October 1957, the Archbishop of Canterbury, Geoffrey Fisher, spoke in support of the Wolfenden Report, saying that "There is a sacred realm of privacy... into which the law, generally speaking, must not intrude. This is a principle of the utmost importance for the preservation of human freedom, self-respect, and responsibility." The first parliamentary debate on the Wolfenden Report was initiated on 4 December 1957 by Lord Pakenham. Of the seventeen peers who spoke in the debate, eight broadly supported the recommendations in the Wolfenden Report. Maxwell Fyfe, by then ennobled as Lord Kilmuir and serving as Lord Chancellor, speaking for the Government, doubted that there would be much public support for implementing the recommendations and stated that further research was required. The Homosexual Law Reform Society was founded on 12 May 1958, mainly to campaign for the implementation of the Wolfenden Committee's recommendations.

=== Decriminalisation of homosexual acts ===
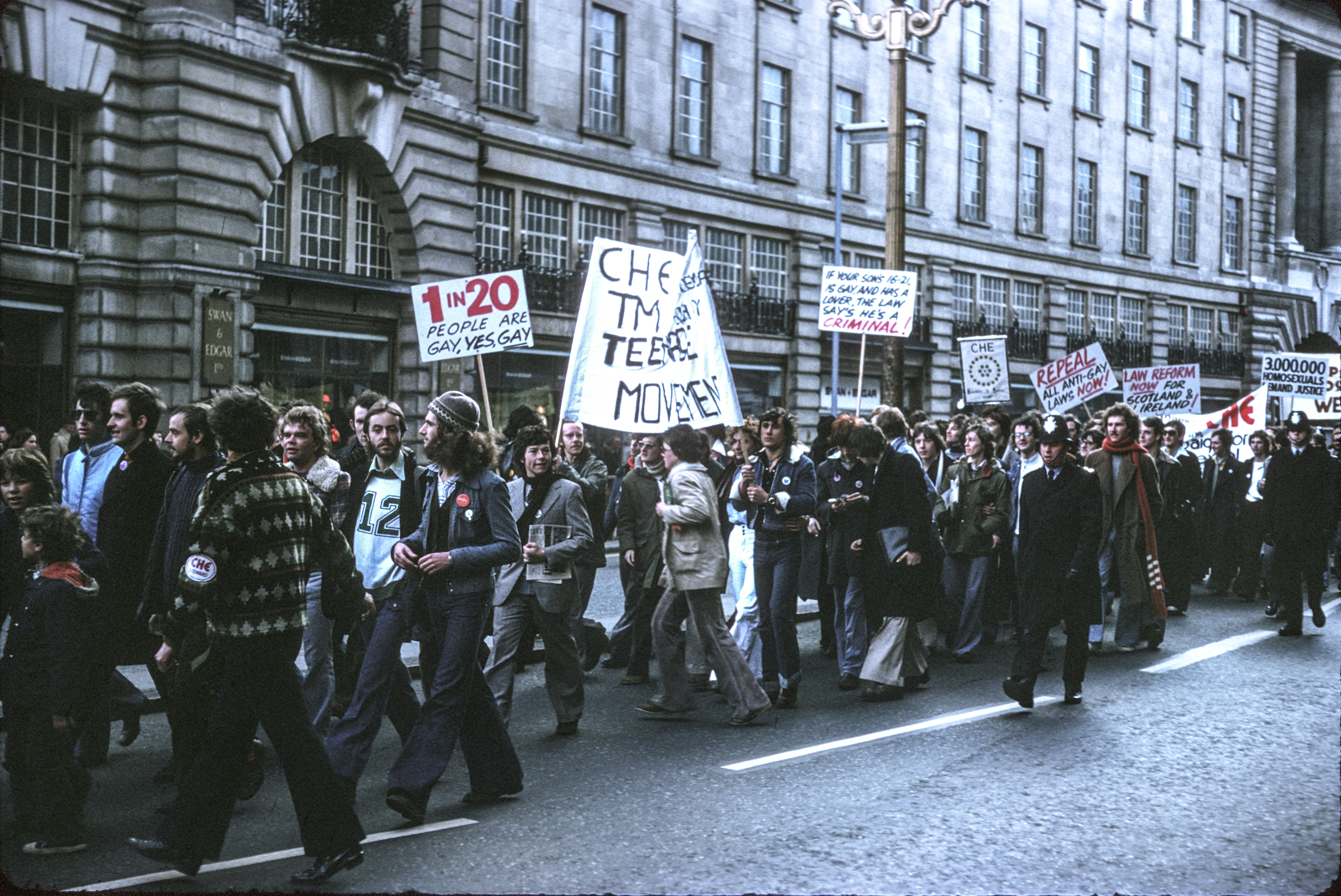
1975 demonstration in London against continued legal inequality

In 1965, Conservative peer Lord Arran proposed the decriminalisation of male homosexual acts (lesbian acts had never been illegal) in the House of Lords. This was followed by Humphry Berkeley in the House of Commons a year later, though Berkeley ascribed his defeat in the 1966 general election to the unpopularity of this action. However, in the newly elected Parliament, Labour MP Leo Abse took up the issue and the Sexual Offences Bill was put before Parliament in order to implement some of the Wolfenden Committee's recommendations after almost ten years of campaigning.

The Sexual Offences Act 1967 was accordingly passed and received royal assent on 27 July 1967 after an intense late-night debate in the House of Commons. It maintained general prohibitions on buggery and indecency between men, but provided for a limited decriminalisation of homosexual acts where three conditions were fulfilled: 1) the act had to be consensual, 2) the act had to take place in private and 3) the act could involve only people that had attained the age of 21. This was a higher age of consent than that for heterosexual acts, which was set at 16. Further, "in private" limited participation in an act to two people. This condition was interpreted strictly by the courts, which took it to exclude acts taking place in a room in a hotel, for example, and in private homes where a third person was present (even if that person was in a different room). These restrictions were overturned by the European Court of Human Rights in 2000.

The 1967 Act extended only to England and Wales. Organisations, therefore, continued to campaign for the goal of full equality in Scotland and Northern Ireland where all homosexual behaviour remained illegal. Same-sex sexual activities were legalised in Scotland on the same basis as in the 1967 Act, by section 80 of the Criminal Justice (Scotland) Act 1980, which came into force on 1 February 1981. An analogous amendment was also made to the law of Northern Ireland, following the determination of a case by the European Court of Human Rights (see Dudgeon v. United Kingdom); since Northern Ireland was subject to direct rule at the time, the relevant legislation was an Order in Council, the Homosexual Offences (Northern Ireland) Order 1982, which came into force on 8 December 1982.

=== Equal age of consent ===
In 1977, Lord Arran introduced the Sexual Offences (Amendment) Bill, which would have lowered the age of consent for homosexual acts to 18. The Bill ended up being rejected by 146 votes to 25.

In 1979, the Home Office Policy Advisory Committee's Working Party report, "Age of Consent in Relation to Sexual Offences", recommended that the age of consent for same-sex sexual activities be reduced from 21 to 18, but no such legislation was enacted as a result.

In February 1994, Parliament considered reform of the law on rape and other sexual offences during the passage of the Criminal Justice and Public Order Bill. Conservative MP Edwina Currie proposed an amendment to equalise the age of consent of same-sex sexual activities to 16. Currie's amendment was defeated by 307 votes to 280. Those who supported it included Tony Blair, John Smith, Neil Kinnock, Paddy Ashdown and William Hague. Those against included Labour MPs David Blunkett and Ann Taylor. There were angry scenes outside the Palace of Westminster at the defeat of the amendment, when those involved in a demonstration organised by the group OutRage! clashed with police. Another amendment proposed by Sir Anthony Durant suggested lowering the age of consent to 18, which passed by 427 votes to 162, and Tory supporters included Michael Howard and John Major. It was opposed by such MPs as John Redwood, Michael Heseltine and John Gummer. An amendment proposed by Simon Hughes which was intended to equalise the age of consent for homosexuals and heterosexuals to 17 was not voted upon. The bill as a whole was given a second reading in the House of Lords by 290 votes to 247. The Duke of Norfolk then sought to reintroduce 21 as the minimum age, but the House of Lords rejected his proposal by 176 votes to 113. An amendment by the Deputy Labour Leader in the House of Lords, Lord McIntosh of Haringey, that would have equalised the age of consent to 16 also failed, being rejected by 245 votes to 71.

In its decision of 1 July 1997, in the case of Sutherland v. United Kingdom, the European Commission of Human Rights found that Articles 8 and 14 of the European Convention on Human Rights were violated by a discriminatory age of consent, on the ground that there was no objective and reasonable justification for maintaining a higher minimum age for male homosexual acts. On 13 October 1997, the Government submitted to the European Court of Human Rights that it would propose a bill to Parliament for a reduction of the age of consent for homosexual acts from 18 to 16. On 22 June 1998, the Crime and Disorder Bill was put before Parliament. Ann Keen proposed amendments to lower the age of consent to 16. The House of Commons accepted these provisions with a majority of 207, but they were rejected by the House of Lords with a majority of 168. Subsequently, the Sexual Offences (Amendment) Bill was introduced on 16 December 1998 and, again, the equalisation of the age of consent was endorsed on 25 January 1999 by the House of Commons, but was rejected on 14 April 1999 by the House of Lords. Those campaigning against the amendment claimed they were simply acting to protect children. Baroness Young, the leader of the campaign against the amendment, said, "Homosexual practices carry great health risks to young people."

The Government reintroduced the bill in 1999. With the prospect of it being passed by the Commons in two successive sessions of Parliament, the Parliament Acts 1911 and 1949 were available to enact the bill should the Lords have rejected it a third time. The Lords passed the bill at second reading, but made an amendment during committee stage to maintain the age of consent for buggery at 18 for both sexes. However, as the bill had not completed its passage through the Lords at the end of the parliamentary session on 30 November 2000, then Speaker of the House of Commons Michael Martin certified that the procedure specified by the Parliament Acts had been complied with. The bill received royal assent a few hours later, and was enacted as the Sexual Offences (Amendment) Act 2000. The provisions of the Act came into force throughout the UK on 8 January 2001, lowering the age of consent to 16. This Act also introduced, for the first time, an age of consent for lesbian sexual acts, as previously there had been no legislation concerning this.

On 1 May 2004, the Sexual Offences Act 2003 entered into force, which swept away all of the previous sex-specific legislation, including the 1967 Act, and introduced instead neutral offences. Thus, the previous conditions relating to privacy were removed, and sexual acts were viewed by the law without regard to the sex of the participants (except that the definition of rape includes use of the defendant's penis).

With the passage of the Sexual Offences (Northern Ireland) Order 2008, Northern Ireland, which had an age of consent of 17 regardless of one's sexual orientation, lowered the age to 16 in 2009 so it would match that of England, Wales, and Scotland.

=== Annulment of convictions ===
On 31 January 2017, the Policing and Crime Act 2017 went into effect after being given royal assent. A section of the Act known as the Alan Turing law officially gave posthumous pardons to the thousands of homosexual men from England and Wales who had been convicted under those regions' old sodomy laws, and gave those still living the possibility to apply to have their conviction erased. "Disregards" have been available since 2012, under the Protection of Freedoms Act, removing the conviction from the person's criminal records. Scotland passed a more comprehensive law in June 2018, with pardons being automatic for those still living. The Northern Ireland Assembly passed a similar law in 2016, with it taking effect on 28 June 2018. Applications for pardons must be made with the Northern Irish Department of Justice.

According to PinkNews, fewer than 200 pardons had been issued in England and Wales by July 2018; by November 2022, Home Office figures showed that 208 convictions had been pardoned ("disregarded"), with 568 applications found ineligible for the process, of which 402 were "offences outside the scope of [the] legislation" and 132 related to activities that would still have been illegal at the time of application.

In June 2019, it was revealed that only two men had sought pardons for historic gay sex offences in Northern Ireland and that they both failed to have their convictions overturned. Across the UK, over half of those who applied for a pardon did not have their convictions overturned.

In January 2022, it was reported that all same-sex criminal convictions in the past across the UK are to be "formally fully pardoned immediately" by the government under a new scheme.

=== Merchant shipping repeal ===
In April 2017, the Parliament of the United Kingdom passed the Merchant Shipping (Homosexual Conduct) Act 2017. This private member's bill was drafted by Conservative MP John Glen. It repealed sections 146(4) and 147(3) of the Criminal Justice and Public Order Act 1994, which was labelled as the UK's "last anti-gay law". It went into effect immediately after royal assent.

=== Female pardons ===
In June 2023, it was formally announced by the UK government that pardons would become available for women "convicted of homosexuality". Female homosexuality had never been a civilian offence in the United Kingdom, but lesbian women serving in the military could still suffer penalties under provisions contained in the Army Act 1955, in the Air Force Act 1955 and in the Naval Discipline Act 1957.

== Recognition of same-sex relationships ==
=== Civil partnership ===
There was no legal recognition of same-sex relationships in Britain until 2005, following the legalisation of civil partnerships under the passage of the Civil Partnership Act 2004 (Welsh: Deddf Partneriaeth Sifil 2004; Scottish Gaelic: Achd Com-pàirteachasan Sìobhalta 2004) on 18 November 2004. Civil partnerships are a separate union which give most (but not all) of the rights and responsibilities of civil marriage, but there are recognition issues in other countries and with the use of courtesy titles. Civil partnerships can take place on any approved premise in the UK and in approved religious venues in England and Wales since 2011 (though religious venues are not compelled), but cannot include religious readings, music or symbols. The Civil Partnership Act came into effect on 5 December 2005. Schemes conferring no formal legal recognition had existed in some cities since the establishment of the London Partnership Register in 2001.

The first civil partnership ceremony took place at 11:00 (GMT) on 5 December 2005 between Matthew Roche and Christopher Cramp at St Barnabas Hospice, Worthing, West Sussex. The usual 14-day waiting period was waived as Roche was suffering from a terminal illness. He died the next day. The first civil partnership ceremonies after the statutory waiting period then took place in Northern Ireland on 19 December, with ceremonies following the next day in Scotland and the day after that in England and Wales.

=== Same-sex marriage ===
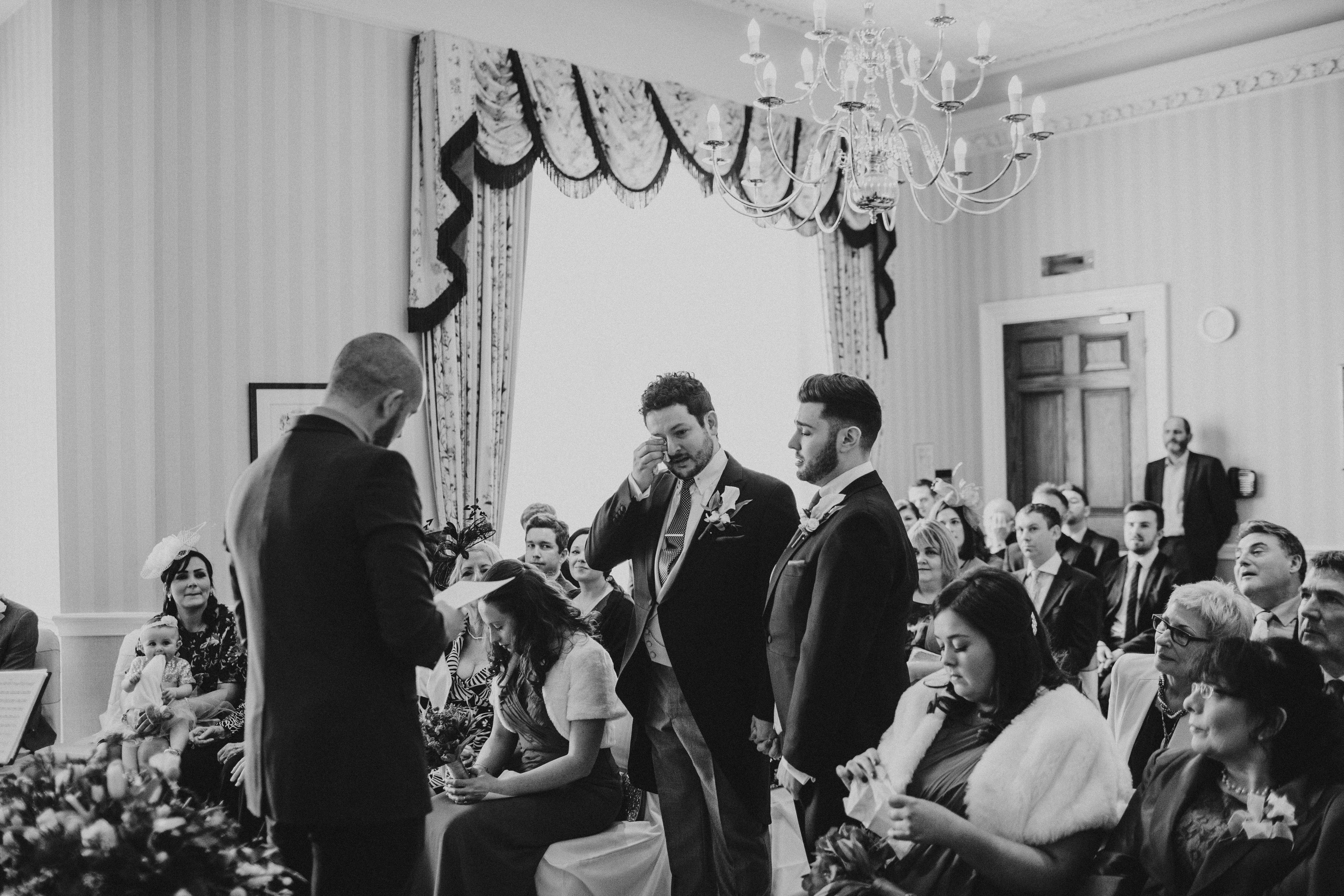
A same-sex marriage in the United Kingdom

Same-sex marriage in the United Kingdom has been the subject of wide debate since the decriminalisation of homosexuality in Britain. Previous legislation in England and Wales had prevented same-sex marriage, including the Marriage Act 1949 which defined marriage as between a man and a woman, the Nullity of Marriage Act 1971 which explicitly banned same-sex marriages, and the Matrimonial Causes Act 1973 which reiterated the provisions of the Nullity of Marriage Act.

While civil partnerships were established nationwide, marriage law is a devolved matter in the United Kingdom and therefore the legislative procedure of same-sex marriage differs by jurisdiction. The Marriage (Same Sex Couples) Act 2013, which allows same-sex marriage in England and Wales, was passed by the UK Parliament in July 2013 and came into force on 13 March 2014, with the first same-sex marriages taking place on 29 March 2014. The Marriage and Civil Partnership (Scotland) Act 2014, allowing same-sex marriage in Scotland, was passed by the Scottish Parliament in February 2014 and came into effect on 16 December 2014.

Same-sex marriages in the UK give all the rights and responsibilities of civil marriage and can be performed on approved premises. This also includes religious venues, providing the religious or belief body has opted-in. However, no religious or belief body is compelled to perform same-sex marriages; the Church of England and the Church in Wales are explicitly banned from doing so. For the purposes of the divorce of a same-sex marriage, the common law definition of adultery remains as sexual intercourse between a man and a woman only, although infidelity with a person of the same sex can be grounds for a divorce as "unreasonable behaviour." Non-consummation is also excluded as a ground for the annulment of a same-sex marriage.

Between 2012 and 2015, the Northern Ireland Assembly voted five times on same-sex marriage; it was passed by a slim majority on the fifth attempt. It was then vetoed by the Democratic Unionist Party using the petition of concern. Following the inconclusive 2017 Northern Ireland Assembly election and failure to form a Northern Ireland Executive by the deadline of 21 October 2019, provisions in the Northern Ireland (Executive Formation etc) Act 2019, which was passed by the UK Parliament on 18 July 2019 and received royal assent on 24 July, mandated the Secretary of State for Northern Ireland to pass regulations legalising same-sex marriage by 13 January 2020. The Secretary of State, Julian Smith signed the regulations on 19 December 2019. Same-sex marriage therefore became legal in Northern Ireland on 13 January 2020, with couples free to register their intent to marry and couples who had previously married elsewhere having their unions recognised from that date. The first same-sex marriage ceremony took place in Carrickfergus on 11 February 2020.

=== Religious same-sex marriages ===
In March 2011, the Liberal Judaism movement became the first Jewish movement in the UK to recognise same-sex marriage as fully equal to that of heterosexual couples.

On 30 June 2021, the Methodist Church voted 254 to 46 in favour of changing the definition of marriage to allow same-sex marriage, thus becoming the largest religious denomination in Britain to permit same-sex marriages.

In September 2021, the Church in Wales voted to "formally bless same-sex couples" (by way of debate and compromise) – but not legally recognise same-sex marriage within titles of the Church officially.

Effective from midnight 1 January 2024, the Church of England began formally performing "blessings to same-sex couples" after passing through by just one voice vote.

== Adoption and family planning ==
Under the Adoption and Children Act 2002 Parliament provided that an application to adopt a child in England and Wales could be made by either a single person or a couple. The previous condition that the couple be married was dropped, thus allowing a same-sex couple to apply. The Lords rejected the proposal on one occasion before it was passed. Supporters of the move in Parliament stressed that adoption was not a "gay rights" issue but one of providing as many children as possible with a stable family environment rather than seeing them kept in care. Opponents raised doubts over the stability of relationships outside marriage, and how instability would impact on the welfare of adopted children. However, the law was successfully passed and went into effect on 30 December 2005. Similar legislation was adopted in Scotland, which came into effect on 28 September 2009. Northern Ireland followed suit in December 2013.

The Human Fertilisation and Embryology Act 2008 was given royal assent on 13 November 2008. The legislation allows for lesbians and their partners (both civil and de facto) equal access to legal presumptions of parentage in cases of in vitro fertilisation (IVF) or assisted/self insemination (other than at home) from the moment the child is born. The law also allows both partners to be identified on the child's birth certificate by the words "parent". The law came into force on 6 April 2009 and is not retroactive (it does not apply before that date). On 6 April 2010 Parental orders for gay men and their partners came into force. A Parental Order is an order issued by the Court to the intended parents of a surrogate child which extinguishes the legal parenthood of the surrogate mother and, if she has one, her partner and reassigns legal parenthood and parental responsibility to the intended parents.

Since 31 August 2009, legislation granting lesbians equal birth rights in England and Wales came into effect, meaning both can now be named on a child's birth certificate, amending the Registration of Births and Deaths Regulations 1987. The legislation was criticised by those who believe it was "damaging the traditional notion of a family". Stonewall Head of Policy and Research Ruth Hunt said the new law makes life easier for lesbian families and stated "Now lesbian couples in the UK who make a considered decision to start a loving family will finally be afforded equal access to services they help fund as taxpayers". Home Office Minister Lord Brett was full of praise in his comments:

This positive change means that, for the first time, female couples who have a child using fertility treatment have the same rights as their heterosexual counterparts to be shown as parents in the birth registration. It is vital that we afford equality wherever we can in society, especially as family circumstances continue to change. This is an important step forward in that process.

Iain Duncan Smith, who led efforts to oppose the change, said that "The absence of fathers generally has a detrimental effect on the child."

In 2016, 9.6% of all adoptions in England involved same-sex couples, an increase from 8.4% in 2015. In 2018, 450 of the 3,820 adoptions in England (approximately 12%) involved same-sex couples.

=== NHS UK lawsuit ===
In November 2021, a lesbian couple launched a judicial review against Frimley NHS Clinical commissioning group over a "discriminatory" fertility policy. The majority of heterosexual couples are only required to "try to conceive" for 2 years before becoming eligible for NHS-funded treatment, whilst same-sex female couples are required to undergo 12 rounds of private IVF treatment before becoming eligible.

== Transgender rights ==
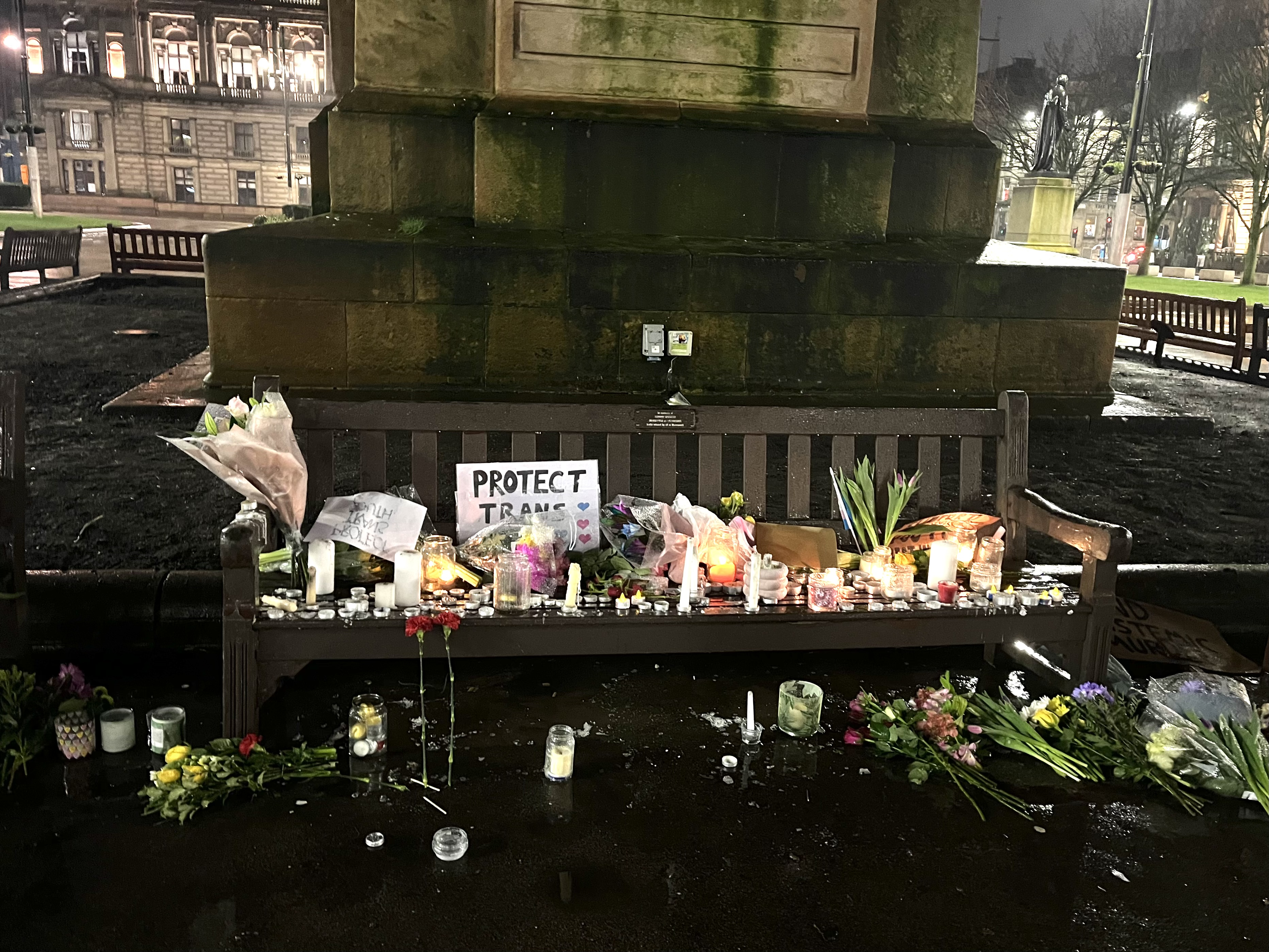
Vigil in Glasgow for Brianna Ghey, a transgender teenager murdered in 2023

In 1970, the decision of the court case Corbett v Corbett made it legally impossible for transgender people to change the sex marker on their birth certificate, rendering them legally unable to marry people of the other gender, as this would legally be considered a (then unrecognised) "same-sex" marriage. The ruling was subsequently used as precedent by many courts in the United States. In the 2002 European Court of Human Rights case Goodwin v United Kingdom, the UK was found to be in breach of Articles 8 and 12 of the European Convention on Human Rights under this status quo. The ruling would lead to the passing of the Gender Recognition Act in 2004. Prior to this, P v S and Cornwall County Council decided by the European Court of Justice in 1996, ruled that European anti-gender discrimination law applied to trans people.

In December 2002, the Lord Chancellor's office published a "Government Policy Concerning Transsexual People" document that categorically states that transsexualism "is not a mental illness."

Since 4 April 2005, as per the Gender Recognition Act 2004 (Welsh: Deddf Cydnabod Rhywedd 2004; Scottish Gaelic: Achd Aithneachadh Gnè 2004), it has been possible for transgender people to change their legal gender in the UK, allowing them to acquire a new birth certificate, affording them full recognition of their acquired sex in law for all purposes. Transgender people must present evidence to a Gender Recognition Panel, which considers their case and issues a Gender Recognition Certificate (GRC); they must have transitioned two years before a GRC is issued. It is not a requirement for sex reassignment surgery to have taken place, although such surgery will be accepted as part of the supporting evidence for a case where it has taken place. There is formal approval of medical gender reassignment available either on the National Health Service (NHS) or privately.

However, there have been concerns regarding marriages and civil partnerships. Under the Gender Recognition Act 2004, transgender people who are married have been required to divorce or annul their marriage in order for them to be issued with a GRC. The Government chose to retain this requirement in the Act as effectively it would have legalised a small category of same-sex marriages. The Civil Partnership Act 2004 allowed the creation of civil partnerships between same-sex couples, but a married couple that includes a transgender partner cannot simply re-register their new status. They must first have their marriage dissolved, gain legal recognition of the new gender and then register for a civil partnership. This is like any divorce with the associated paperwork and costs.

With the legalisation of same-sex marriage in England and Wales, existing marriages will continue where one or both parties change their legal gender and both parties wish to remain married. The legislation does not restore any of the marriages of transgender people that were previously forcibly annulled as a precondition for them securing a GRC and states that a GRC will not be issued unless the spouse of the transgender person has consented. If the spouse does not consent, the marriage must be terminated before a GRC may be issued.

A 2019 study by Paul Baker, a professor at Lancaster University, found that of over 6,000 articles written in the UK press from 2018 to 2019, numerous were written "in order to be critical of trans people" and cast "trans people as unreasonable and aggressive".

Since 1 January 2021, UK telecommunications regulator Ofcom explicitly includes "gender reassignment" (alongside race, disability, religion, sex and sexual orientation) within its hate speech legal policies and procedures.

In April 2021, it was reported that the fee for a Gender Recognition Certificate would be reduced to £5 in early May 2021.

In September 2021, a report from the Council of Europe on anti-LGBTI sentiment in Europe described anti-trans rhetoric in the United Kingdom as having gained "baseless and concerning credibility, at the expense of both trans people's civil liberties and women's and children's rights", citing an increase in anti-trans hate crimes since 2015 and statements made at the 2021 IDAHOT forum by Minister of Equalities, Kemi Badenoch.

=== Transgender youth ===
Transgender youth are covered by the Equality Act 2010, and therefore protected from discrimination as are adult trans people. In the UK, children and young people under 16 may also consent to certain medical treatments based on the principle of Gillick competence, which until 2022 included puberty blockers.

Until March 2024, children who wished to medically transition were referred to the NHS Gender Identity Development Service (GIDS), the only gender identity clinic for people under 18 in the UK at the time. GIDS offered no surgical options for transition, per National Institute for Health and Care Excellence guidance. In October 2019, the service was subject to a legal case, Bell v Tavistock, and in December 2020 the High Court of Justice ruled that children under 16 could not independently consent to the use of puberty blockers. This was widely condemned by LGBTQ+ rights groups, such as Stonewall, The Consortium and Mermaids, as well as human rights organisations, including Amnesty International and Liberty.

Scholars suggested the judgement could have wider impact on the principle of Gillick competence – which allows young people who satisfy the requirements for competence to make decisions about their reproductive health, among other things – and described the judgement as "protectionist". The Royal College of Paediatrics and Child Health issued a statement hoping for further clarity, and leave to appeal was granted in January 2021. This appeal was successful, with the original ruling being overturned in September 2021.

In September 2020, the NHS launched a review of gender identity services for young people, led by paediatrician Hilary Cass. In July 2022, following the release of the Cass Review's interim report, the NHS said it would close GIDS and replace it with eight regional healthcare centres. Dr Cal Horton, a research fellow in the Centre for Diversity Policy Research and Practice at Oxford Brookes, accused the interim report of "cis-supremacy".

In November 2022, the World Professional Association for Transgender Health (WPATH) – along with regional groups ASIAPATH, EPATH, PATHA, and USPATH – issued a statement criticising the NHS England interim service specifications based on the interim Cass report. It said the report pathologised gender diversity, made "outdated" assumptions about trans people, ignored newer evidence, and promoted an "unconscionable degree of medical and state intrusion" into everyday matters such as pronouns and clothing choice, as well as into access to gender-affirming care. It further said that "the denial of gender-affirming treatment under the guise of 'exploratory therapy' is tantamount to 'conversion' or 'reparative' therapy under another name".

The completed Cass Review was published on 10 April 2024. It said that there was no high quality evidence for the use of puberty blockers to treat young people, and that there was insufficient evidence of their safety. The final report was condemned by some queer people, including experts and charities.

Among the criticisms were suggestions that Cass had not engaged with mainstream LGBTQ+ groups but had given undue attention to smaller, controversial groups, such as the LGB Alliance and several gender critical groups, which had campaigned against trans-affirming healthcare and which have been described as transphobic by most LGBTQ+ groups. Cass was also criticised for having no prior experience of treating trans children while excluding trans experts from the process. The review was also criticised by a number of medical organisations and academic groups in the UK and internationally for its methodology and findings.

The British Medical Association (BMA) said it would conduct its own evaluation of the review, after the BMA’s Council voted to "publicly critique the Cass Review". Mermaids warned that the report "could be used to justify additional barriers to accessing care for some trans young people in the same way the interim report has been". Amnesty International criticised "sensationalised coverage" of the review, stating it was "being weaponised by people who revel in spreading disinformation and myths about healthcare for trans young people".

In March 2024, NHS England said that gender identity clinics would no longer prescribe puberty blockers to children or young people. The review said such treatment should only be prescribed as part of a clinical trial. In August, the referral pathway for gender clinics was revised and a review of adult services was also commissioned. On 11 December 2024, the ban was renewed indefinitely and is set to be reconsidered in 2027.

On 28 March 2024, after several delays, the Tavistock GIDS was closed; two of the eight planned regional centres opened in April. No other centres have opened to date. As a result of delays in establishing alternative services, many 16 and 17 year olds were transferred to adult services, where they received less exploratory and more medicalised treatment than they would have received in children's services.

In October 2024, over 100 experts and organisations signed an open letter to the new Health Minister Wes Streeting, stating they had a "deep lack of confidence" in the Cass Review and cautioning against the "degrading" of trans healthcare based on it. The letter said the Cass Review did not follow best practice according to other independent reviews in controversial areas:

[Trustworthy reviews] have a clear mandate and problem to solve which are raised by those directly affected, not by newspaper columnists or ideologues. They do not exclude members of the patient cohort and those with long-term experience in the field from being part of their team or consider professional or lived experience “bias”.

In England a delayed clinical trial into puberty blockers is planned for early 2025.

In April 2025, it was reported that the NHS had not issued any new prescriptions of gender affirming hormones to minors in the year since the Cass Review was published despite them not being banned, with the NHS instead prioritising "holistic care". However, referrals to these new services are low compared to the former GIDS programme at Tavistock, due to the new referral process being made more complex and families choosing to get help for their children somewhere else — such as by acquiring hormones on the black market or abroad.

=== Single-sex schools ===
In January 2022, the Girls' Day School Trust (GDST) updated its policies to bar admissions for trans girls without a Gender Recognition Certificate (GRC). The trust said it could lose its single-sex status if it admitted trans students who were legally male. They said they would address applications from trans girls with a GRC on a "case-by-case" basis. The trust said it was permitted to exclude trans students due to the exemptions in the Equality Act 2010. Trans boys who transitioned after being admitted to GDST schools would be allowed to remain.

=== Rugby England policy ===
In July 2022, Rugby Football Union (RFU) and Rugby Football League (RFL) implemented a single-sex policy for under-12s girls' competitions, which excludes trans girls from girls' teams. The Rugby League said, "Non-contact rugby league … and wheelchair rugby league remains mixed-gender and available for all without any gender-based eligibility criteria."

=== British Airways ===
From 14 November 2022, British Airways updated its uniform policy to allow any employee to wear makeup, earrings and nail varnish, or to carry a handbag or other accessories.

=== Transgender immigrants ===
In December 2023, the UK government said it would no longer accept gender recognition certificates issued by 50 countries and U.S. states, due to concerns those jurisdictions allowed people to transition "too easily". Individuals from these locations would have to apply for a new GRC according to British law to legally change their gender in the UK. The jurisdictions proposed included Sweden, New York State, and Belgium. Many of them offer gender recognition certificates based on self-identification (e.g., such as a statutory declaration) rather than a medicalised pathway.

Women and Equalities Minister Kemi Badenoch said the changes were "long overdue", and that change was necessary to create parity between UK applicants and foreign nationals. Badenoch's plans were criticised by Shadow Equalities Minister Anneliese Dodds (Labour), who said the list of accepted jurisdictions may have diplomatic consequences, since it no longer included the other four members of the Five Eyes intelligence alliance: Canada, the US, Australia and New Zealand.

=== Toilets in England ===
In May 2024, Kemi Badenoch proposed legislation to mandate single-sex toilets for all new buildings within England, except those in schools and prisons. Gender-neutral toilets with their own self-contained sink would be allowed in addition to single-sex toilets, or instead of them if space otherwise would not allow single-sex toilets.

In June 2024, five women launched employment tribunal action against the County Durham and Darlington NHS Foundation Trust alleging harassment and discrimination due to the trust's diversity policies. The women had raised concerns about sharing changing facilities with a trans staff member and were unhappy with the alternative facilities provided. They were supported by the anti-LGBTQ evangelical organisation Christian Legal Centre, and its linked campaign group Christian Concern, which said the NHS was "putting a dangerous and discredited transgender ideology ahead of staff and patient safety, not to mention biological reality". The trust said it aimed to have a "safe, secure, and respectful working environment". In a statement, Health Secretary Wes Streeting said "everybody deserves to feel safe and treated with respect at their workplace".

In August 2024, NHS England introduced new mandatory diversity training which, according to the Daily Mail, stated that it was potentially "illegal harassment" to ask a trans colleague to use another toilet or changing room. The NHS said the guidance was "out of date" and had been removed while new training was developed.

=== Passports court case ===
In December 2021, the Supreme Court upheld the judgment in R (Elan-Cane) v Secretary of State for the Home Department (2020), which had found the UK government could refuse to add an X gender marker on UK passports. The case is awaiting an appeal to the European Court of Human Rights in Strasbourg. Both Denmark and Malta in Europe have recognised gender X options on their passports. The Gender Recognition Act 2004 does not allow a person to legally identify as anything other than male or female.

== Intersex rights ==
Intersex people in the United Kingdom face significant gaps, particularly in protection from non-consensual medical interventions, and protection from discrimination. Actions by intersex organisations aim to eliminate unnecessary medical interventions and harmful practices, promote social acceptance, and equality in line with Council of Europe and United Nations demands.

== Discrimination protections ==
Regulations were introduced for discrimination protections on sexual orientation in employment on 1 December 2003, following the adoption of an EC Directive in 2000, providing for the prohibition of discrimination in employment on the grounds of sexual orientation. The Sex Discrimination (Gender Reassignment) Regulations 1999 created certain legal protections for transgender people for the first time in British history. The Regulations banned discrimination against individuals undergoing "gender reassignment" in employment and vocational training. Similar legislation, the Sex Discrimination (Gender Reassignment) Regulations (Northern Ireland) 1999, was passed in Northern Ireland. The Sex Discrimination (Amendment of Legislation) Regulations 2008 extended these protections to cover discrimination in goods, facilities and services.

On 30 April 2007, the Sexual Orientation Regulations came into force, following the introduction of similar provisions in Northern Ireland in January 2007. They provided a general prohibition of discrimination in the provision of goods and services on the grounds of sexual orientation. Similar legislation had long previously been in force in respect of discrimination on the grounds of sex, race, disability and marital status. The introduction of the Regulations was controversial and a dispute arose between the Government and the Roman Catholic Church in England and Wales over exemptions for Catholic adoption agencies.

Archbishop Vincent Nichols of Birmingham declared his opposition to the Act, saying that the legislation contradicted the Catholic Church's moral values. Several Catholic adoption agencies requested exemption from sexual orientation regulations, and the adoption charity Catholic Care obtained a judgement on 17 March 2010 instructing the Charity Commission to reconsider its case. The Charity Commission again found no grounds to make an exception for Catholic Care, a decision upheld on appeal. In August 2011, the Upper Tribunal agreed to hear the charity's fourth appeal in the case. In November 2012, the appeal was dismissed by the Upper Tribunal, with the Tribunal ruling in favour of the Charity Commission. Catholic Care stated its intention to appeal the judgement.

In October 2007, the Government announced that it would seek to introduce an amendment to the Criminal Justice and Immigration Act to create a new offence of incitement to hatred on the grounds of sexual orientation. This followed the creation of an offence on religious hatred that had proved controversial in 2006 (see Racial and Religious Hatred Act 2006). Incitement to hatred on the grounds of sexual orientation was already illegal in Northern Ireland. Scotland enacted similar legislation in 2009, which also includes gender identity as a protected ground.

The Equality Act 2010 (Welsh: Deddf Cydraddoldeb 2010; Scottish Gaelic: Achd na Co-ionannachd 2010; Cornish: Reyth Parder 2010) received royal assent on 8 April 2010. The primary purpose of the Act was to codify the complicated and numerous array of Acts and Regulations, which formed the basis of anti-discrimination law in the UK including the Equal Pay Act 1970, the Sex Discrimination Act 1975, the Race Relations Act 1976, the Disability Discrimination Act 1995 and three major statutory instruments protecting discrimination in employment on grounds of religion or belief, sexual orientation and age. This legislation has the same goals as the US Civil Rights Act 1964 and four major EU equal treatment directives, whose provisions it mirrors and implements. It requires equal treatment in access to employment as well as private and public services, regardless of gender, race, disability, sexual orientation, transgender status, belief and age. The Act amended the Approved Premises (Marriage and Civil Partnership) Regulations 2005 to allow civil partnership ceremonies on religious premises in England and Wales. It also extended transgender rights, banning discrimination by schools on the grounds of gender reassignment.

Other initiatives have included the establishment of the Commission for Equality and Human Rights on 1 October 2007 which is tasked with working for equality in all areas and replaced the previous commissions dedicated to sex, race and disability alone; the setting up of the Sexual Orientation and Gender Advisory Group within the Department of Health; a provision of the Criminal Justice Act 2003 that a court must treat hostility based on sexual orientation as an aggravating factor for sentencing a person; guidance from the Crown Prosecution Service on dealing with homophobic crimes; and a commitment from the Government to work for LGBT rights at an international level.

=== Section 28 ===
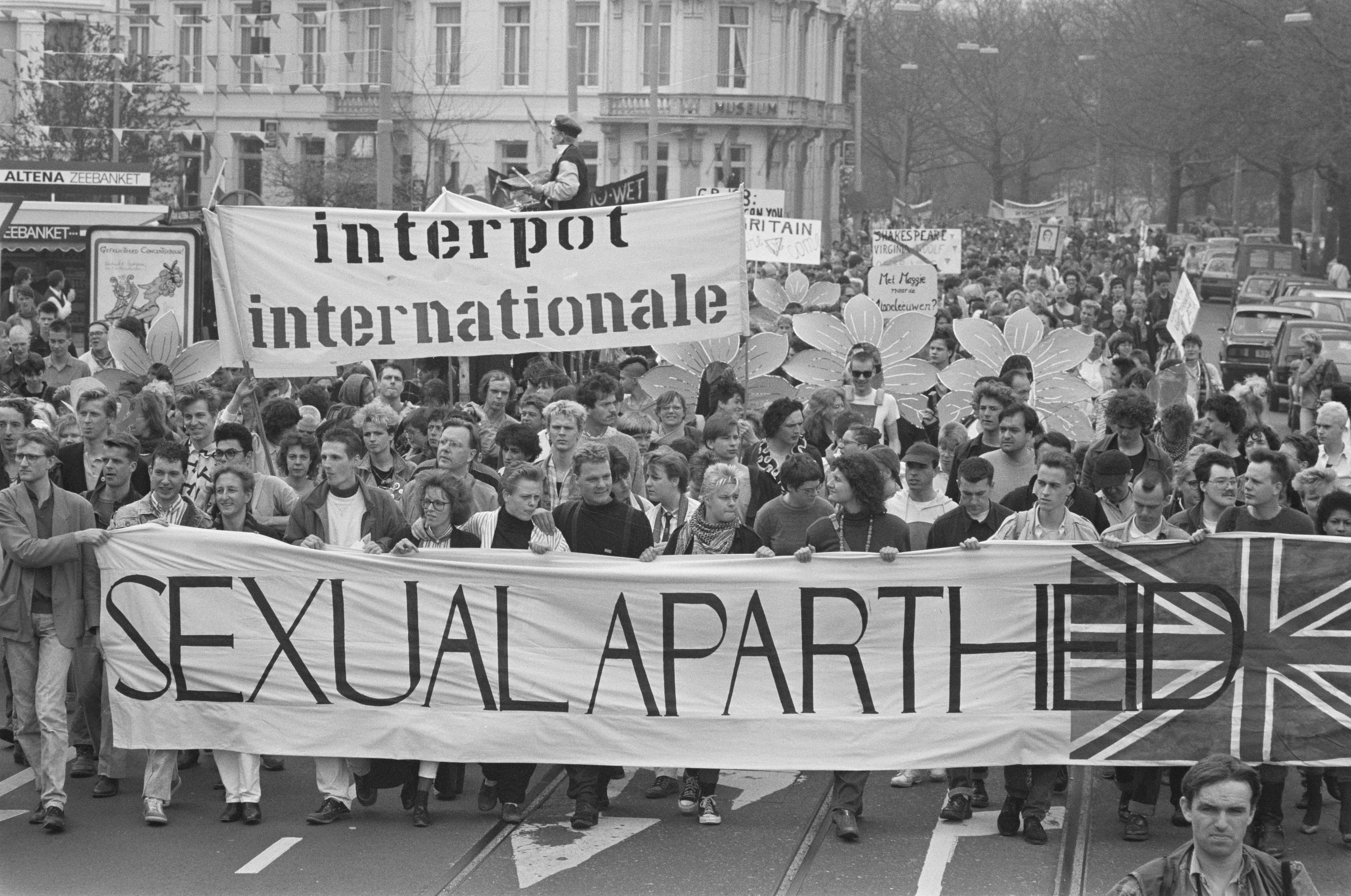
"Sexual Apartheid" - demonstration against Section 28 and British homophobia in Amsterdam, 1988

The 1980s saw a setback for LGBT rights. The availability in the libraries of schools run by the Inner London Education Authority of a book considered by some to "promote" homosexuality led to protests and a campaign for new legislation. Consequently, the Local Government Act 1988 included a provision prohibiting "the intentional promotion of homosexuality" by any local authority and "the teaching in any maintained school of the acceptability of homosexuality as a pretended family relationship." The provision was known as Section 28, and amended section 2A of the earlier Local Government Act 1986. Changes in the structure of local government since that date led to some confusion over the precise circumstances in which the new law applied, including the question of whether or not it applied at all in state schools.

Section 28 (called Section 2A in Scotland) was repealed in Scotland within the first two years of the existence of the Scottish Parliament, by the Ethical Standards in Public Life etc. (Scotland) Act 2000. A move to remove the provision in England and Wales was prevented following opposition in the House of Lords, led by Baroness Young. Following her death in 2002, it was repealed by the Labour Government in the Local Government Act 2003, which took effect on 18 November 2003. During the passage of the bill, no attempt was made to retain the section and an amendment seeking to preserve it using ballots was defeated in the House of Lords. In June 2009, David Cameron, Conservative Party Leader, formally apologised for his party introducing the law, stating that it was a mistake and offensive to gay people.

=== Public Order Act 1986 ===
Section 29AB of the Public Order Act 1986 states:

In this Part "hatred on the grounds of sexual orientation" means hatred against a group of persons defined by reference to sexual orientation (whether towards persons of the same sex, the opposite sex or both)

Section 29JA, titled "Protection of freedom of expression (sexual orientation)", of the Act states the following:

(1) In this Part, for the avoidance of doubt, the discussion or criticism of sexual conduct or practices or the urging of persons to refrain from or modify such conduct or practices shall not be taken of itself to be threatening or intended to stir up hatred.

(2) In this Part, for the avoidance of doubt, any discussion or criticism of marriage which concerns the sex of the parties to marriage shall not be taken of itself to be threatening or intended to stir up hatred.

=== Homophobic chanting at football matches ===
In July 2020, the Department for Digital, Culture, Media and Sport announced they wished to amend the Football (Offences) Act 1991 to explicitly ban homophobic chanting at football matches. Currently, those accused of homophobic chanting are prosecuted for "indecent" chanting.

An earlier effort was made in 2018 to ban homophobic chanting by Damian Collins, at the time chair of the Digital, Culture, Media and Sport Committee, and former Wales rugby player Gareth Thomas.

== Bias-motivated violence and abuse ==
From 2014–15 to 2018–19, the number of recorded incidents of homophobic abuse in the UK increased from 5,807 to 13,530, while the number of prosecutions fell from 1,157 to 1,058. The National Police Chiefs' Council attributed this to a lack of witnesses or evidence, including difficulties in proving the assault was motivated by the victim's sexual orientation or gender identity. "Many of these non-violent offences present less evidential opportunities and victims often feel that there is a barrier between bringing the matter to court and prefer to make police aware of each offence," said a spokesman for the Metropolitan Police Service. West Yorkshire and South Yorkshire saw their reports increase from 172 to 961 and 73 to 375, respectively. The West Yorkshire Police said this increase was in part due to "improvements in the way we record crime and the fact that many victims have the confidence to come forward".

In 2019, the Ministry of Justice revealed that 11 transgender prisoners were sexually assaulted in male prisons in England and Wales.

== Military service ==
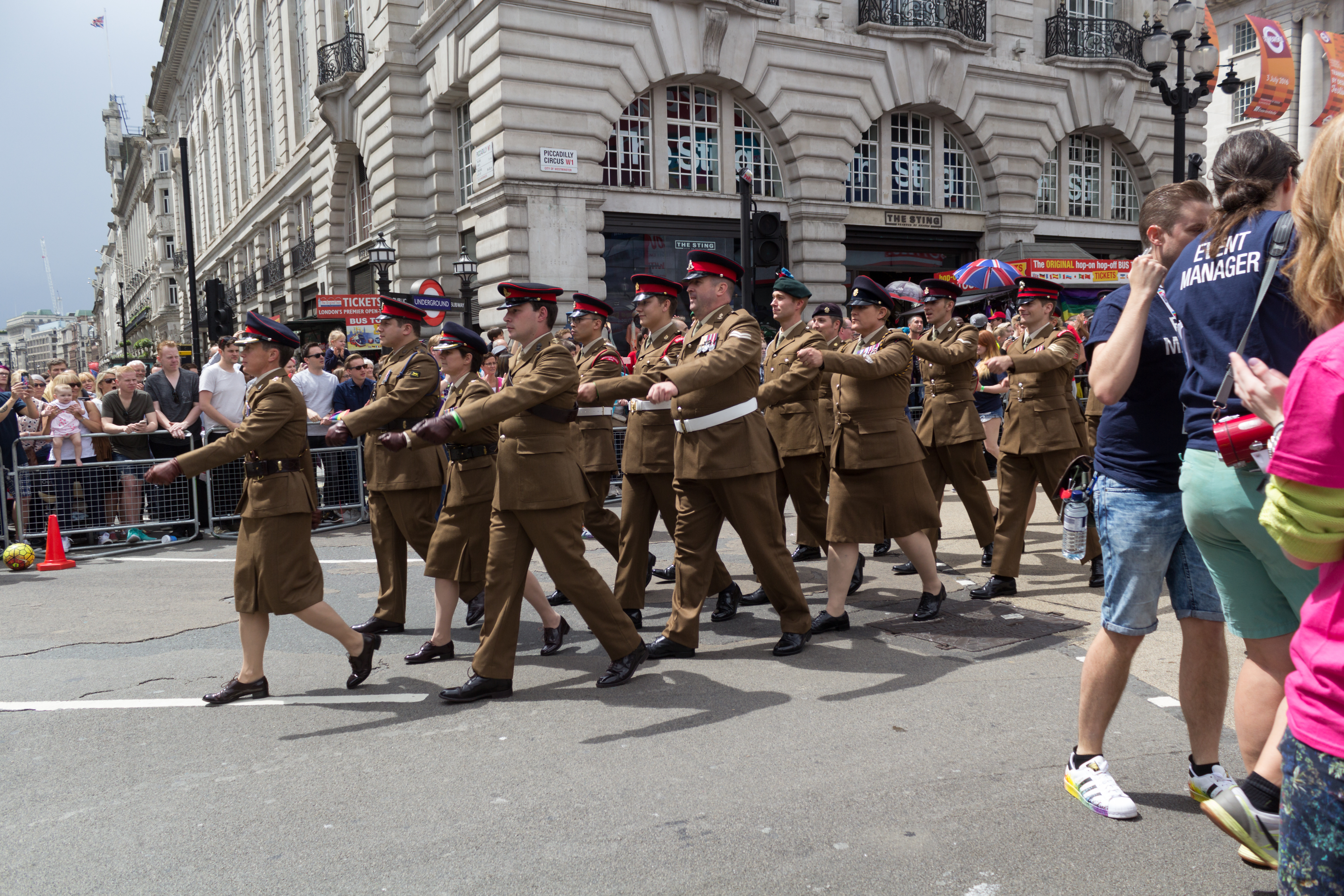
Members of Her Majesty's Armed Forces marching at the 2016 Pride in London parade

LGBT people have been allowed to serve openly in His Majesty's Armed Forces since 2000, and discrimination on the basis of sexual orientation has been forbidden since 2010. It is also forbidden for someone to pressure LGBT people to come out. All personnel are subject to the same rules against intolerance, bullying and sexual harassment, regardless of gender identity or sexual orientation. The British military also recognises civil partnerships and grants same-sex couples the same rights to allowances and housing as opposite-sex couples.

The British military actively recruits LGBT people and have deployed recruiting teams to many Pride events: the Royal Navy advertises for recruits in gay magazines and has allowed gay sailors to hold civil partnership ceremonies on board ships and, since 2006, to march in full naval uniform at gay pride marches; British Army and Royal Air Force personnel could march but had to wear civilian clothes until 2008, now all military personnel are permitted to attend such marches in uniform.

The current policy was accepted at the lower ranks first, with many senior officers worrying for their troops without a modern acceptance of homosexuality that their personnel had grown up with. One Brigadier resigned but with little impact. Since the change, support at the senior level has grown. General Sir Richard Dannatt, the Chief of the General Staff (head of the Army), told members of the Army-sponsored Fourth Joint Conference on LGBT Matters that homosexuals were welcome to serve in the Army. In a speech to the conference in 2008, the first of its kind by any Army chief, General Sir Richard said that respect for LGBT officers and soldiers was now "a command responsibility" and was vital for "operational effectiveness."

The British Army, Royal Air Force and Royal Navy now require all recruits to undergo Equality and Diversity training as part of their Military Annual Training Tests and stress tolerance, specifically citing homosexual examples in training videos, in line with Army, Navy and RAF Core Values and Standards, including "Respect for Others" and "Appropriate Behaviour."

In 2009, on the tenth anniversary of the change of law that permitted homosexuality in the Armed Forces, newspapers reported that the lifting of the ban had no perceivable impact on the operational effectiveness on the military. The anniversary was widely celebrated, including in the Army's in-house publication Soldier Magazine, with a series of articles including the July 2009 cover story and newspapers articles.

In 2015, following the fifteenth anniversary, the Ministry of Defence announced changes to its monitoring process for new recruits and added sexuality to their equal opportunities monitoring process.

=== Military pardons ===
In February 2021, the Ministry of Defence introduced what became the Armed Forces Act 2021 that automatically pardons all gay sex criminal records within the UK military. It was also announced that military personnel dismissed on grounds of homosexuality will be able to have their service medals restored if they had been taken away.

== Conversion therapy ==
In 2007, the Royal College of Psychiatrists, the main professional organisation of psychiatrists in Britain, issued a report stating that: "Evidence shows that LGBT people are open to seeking help for mental health problems. However, they may be misunderstood by therapists who regard their homosexuality as the root cause of any presenting problem such as depression or anxiety. Unfortunately, therapists who behave in this way are likely to cause considerable distress. A small minority of therapists will even go so far as to attempt to change their client's sexual orientation. This can be deeply damaging. Although there are now a number of therapists and organisations in the US and in the UK that claim that therapy can help homosexuals to become heterosexual, there is no evidence that such change is possible."

A paper written in 2007 by Elizabeth Peel, Victoria Clarke and Jack Drescher stated that only one organisation in Britain could be identified with conversion therapy, a religious organisation called "The Freedom Trust" (part of Exodus International): "whereas a number of organisations in the US (both religious and scientific/psychological) promote conversion therapy, there is only one in the UK of which we are aware". The paper reported that practitioners who did provide these sorts of treatments between the 1950s and 1970s now view homosexuality as healthy, and the evidence suggests that 'conversion therapy' is a historical rather than a contemporary phenomenon in Britain, where treatment for homosexuality has always been less common than in the US.

In 2008, the Royal College of Psychiatrists stated: "The Royal College shares the concern of both the American Psychiatric Association and the American Psychological Association that positions espoused by bodies like the National Association for Research and Therapy of Homosexuality (NARTH) in the United States are not supported by science. There is no sound scientific evidence that sexual orientation can be changed. Furthermore, so-called treatments of homosexuality as recommended by NARTH create a setting in which prejudice and discrimination can flourish."

In 2009, a research survey into mental health practitioners in the United Kingdom concluded that "a significant minority of mental health professionals are attempting to help lesbian, gay and bisexual clients to become heterosexual. Given lack of evidence for the efficacy of such treatments, this is likely to be unwise or even harmful." Scientific American reported on this: "One in 25 British psychiatrists and psychologists say they would be willing to help homosexual and bisexual patients try to convert to heterosexuality, even though there is no compelling scientific evidence a person can willfully become straight", and explained that 17% of those surveyed said they had tried to help reduce or suppress homosexual feelings, and 4% said they would try to help homosexual people convert to heterosexuality in the future.

Conversion therapy in the UK has been described by the BBC as "a fiercely contested topic" and part of a larger "culture war" within the UK. In July 2017, the Church of England's General Synod passed a motion which criticised conversion therapy as "unethical, potentially harmful and having no place in the modern world" and called for "a ban on the practice of conversion therapy aimed at altering sexual orientation." In February 2018, the Memorandum of Understanding on Conversion Therapy which had been issued by the United Kingdom Council for Psychotherapy (UKCP) in October 2017 to provide "protection of the public through a commitment to ending the practice of 'conversion therapy' in the UK" was approved by the National Health Service (NHS). Stonewall has stated that all major counselling and psychotherapy bodies in the UK have joined the NHS in signing the Memorandum condemning conversion therapy.

In October 2017, a church in Anfield in Liverpool was exposed by a Liverpool Echo investigation for offering to "cure" gay people through a three-day starvation programme. Labour MP Dan Carden raised the issue in Parliament, calling for a legislative ban on conversion therapies, which "have no place in 21st century Britain".

In March 2018, a majority of representatives in the European Parliament passed a resolution in a 435–109 vote condemning conversion therapy and urging European Union member states to ban the practice. A report released by the European Parliament's Intergroup on LGBT Rights stated that the UK was one of a few areas in the EU which "explicitly banned LGBTI conversion therapies." In July 2018, the UK Government announced as part of their LGBT Action Plan that they will "bring forward proposals" to ban conversion therapy at the legislative level. In a 2018 survey of LGBT people commissioned by the Government, 5 per cent of respondents said they had been offered therapy, with 2 per cent saying they had undergone it.

On 20 July 2020, Prime Minister Boris Johnson announced his support for banning conversion therapy throughout the UK, stating "On the gay conversion therapy thing, I think that's absolutely abhorrent. It has no place in civilised society. It has no place in this country."

In September 2020, religious leaders from every major faith came together in "a rare show of unity" to urge the UK government to legislate a ban on conversion therapy.

In February 2021, gay actor and broadcaster Stephen Fry called upon the UK government to "stop dithering" and ban conversion therapy.

On 11 May 2021, as part of the State Opening of Parliament, Queen Elizabeth II stated that the UK planned to ban conversion therapy. In her 10-minute Queen's Speech, which is prepared by the UK Government, she stated that "measures will be brought forward to address racial and ethnic disparities and ban conversion therapy." However, the Government's plans involve a consultation before any ban is put in place, which led to criticism by campaigners including Stonewall that such delay leaves LGBT groups "at further risk of abuse." This delay will further extend the current three-year wait from when the government first pledged to ban conversion therapy in 2018 and four years since multiple health organisations and patient groups signed a document in 2017 warning all forms of conversion therapy were "unethical and potentially harmful".

On 1 July 2021, it was reported that the Methodist Church of Great Britain canon law legally bans conversion therapy and also called upon the UK government to legally ban conversion therapy.

In October 2021, the government began a six-week consultation on how to end conversion therapy, described as "an attempt to change or suppress someone's sexual orientation or gender identity". Minister Liz Truss said "There should be no place for the abhorrent practice of coercive conversion therapy in our society." In December 2021, the government extended the consultation by eight weeks, following criticism and the threat of legal action by the gender-critical group Fair Play for Women. Critics of the proposed legislation say it could criminalise the act of helping someone with gender dysphoria to feel at ease with their birth sex. Nikki da Costa, former special adviser to Boris Johnson, said the timing of the consultation was "driven" by an intent to "get a good new story" ahead of an LGBTQ conference in 2022. Nancy Kelley, CEO of Stonewall, described conversion therapy as "abhorrent" and welcomed the extension.

In late March 2022, the UK Government announced its intention to ban conversion therapy for sexual orientation but not for transgender people, despite previously describing all conversion therapy as "abhorrent". As a result, over 100 organisations pulled out of a planned Government-backed equality conference, which was subsequently abandoned. Johnson defended his decision, citing "complexities and sensitivities" regarding gender conversion therapy, with particular attention given to children with gender dysphoria whose parents and counsellors might wish to openly discuss gender without fear of prosecution.

On 10 May 2022, the Queen's speech included an announcement of legislation within the coming Parliamentary session to ban conversion therapy within the UK for sexual orientation. In the King's Speech on 7 November 2023, the ruling Conservative government failed to include a ban on conversion therapy in its future plans.

In July 2024, the new Labour Party Government at Westminster formally announced it would establish community consultation and an inquiry on a bill to ban conversion therapy within the UK.

== Sex education ==
The Public Sector Equality Duty provision of the Equality Act 2010 requires that information regarding bullying based on, among other things, LGBT identity be published and that solutions be found concerning how to counter this issue. The first information regarding schools and pupils located in England and English-governed public authorities in Scotland and Wales were published on 6 April 2012. In 2013, Ofsted published guidelines concerning how to counter homophobic and transphobic bullying at schools in England. Part of these guidelines included sex and relationships education for LGBT pupils.

On 12 February 2018, the Church of England's Education Office published a policy endorsing sex education which includes, among other things, LGBT education. Concerning sexuality, the policy states "sex education should include an understanding that all humans are sexual beings and that sexual desire is natural. Pupils should be taught that humans express their sexuality differently and that there is diversity in sexual desire". The policy also states that "pupils must be allowed to explore questions of identity and how we value our own identity and the uniqueness of other people. PSHE [Personal, Social, Health and Economic education] must help pupils recognise their true identity, and teach them that our media-framed, market-driven culture that often leads to body image anxiety can be challenged. This issue is the focus of the Bishop of Gloucester's #liedentity campaign which aims to challenge negative body image and encouraging young people to look within to discover true value and beauty."

In July 2018, Education Minister Damian Hinds announced new government regulations concerning sex education. Topics such as mental wellbeing, consent, keeping safe online, physical health and fitness, and LGBT issues will be covered under the new guidelines, which are the first changes to sex education regulations since 2000, and which will be mandatory in all primary and secondary schools in England from September 2020 onward. The move was welcomed by LGBT groups in particular, who cited statistics showing that only 13% of LGBT youth had been taught about healthy same-sex relationships in schools. In addition, parents will retain certain rights to veto sex education lessons, but by the age of 16, the child may attend the lessons regardless of the parents' wishes. The draft guidance states: "By the end of primary school, pupils should know that others' families, either in school or in the wider world, sometimes look different from their family, but that they should respect those differences and know that other children's families are also characterised by love and care for them." The guidance for secondary schools adds: "Pupils should be taught the facts and the law about sex, sexuality, sexual health and gender identity in an age-appropriate and inclusive way... All pupils should feel that the content is relevant to them and their developing sexuality."

This followed reports of some religious schools deliberately avoiding the issue, most notably an Orthodox Jewish school in north London which in 2018 had removed all references to the homosexual victims of Nazi persecution throughout their textbooks. According to the Department of Education, faith-based schools would no longer have a right to opt-out of sex education lessons. In September 2018, the UK's Chief Rabbi, Ephraim Mirvis, agreed to comply with this new policy and published guidelines on how to teach LGBT sex education in British Jewish schools.

In October 2018, The Sunday Times reported that the British Government had decided to grant exemptions to private schools from LGBT-inclusive education. In November 2018, however, both the PSHE Association and Sex Education Forum published a policy road-map which stated, among other things, that "the law requires that Relationships and Sex Education (RSE) is to be taught in all secondary schools in England, and that Relationships Education is to be taught in all primary schools in England." The road-map also detailed 10 steps which will be used to enforce the policy, and also stated that "Health Education will also be mandatory in all government funded schools, which includes content on puberty." In February 2019, the Department of Education enacted a statutory guidance policy which will assist schools in England with PSHE when it becomes compulsory in 2020.

A measure to make PSHE compulsory received approval from the House of Lords in April 2019. The Department for Education (DfE) published final statutory guidance for teaching Relationships Education, Relationships and Sex Education (RSE) and Health Education in June 2019. The guidelines, which were also published by the House of Commons, require, among other things, acknowledgement of England's laws concerning LGBT rights, including the legalisation of same-sex marriage, and the protection of the "physical and mental well-being" of LGBT children. Despite not mandatory until September 2020, schools in England were encouraged to enact the new PSHE curriculum starting in September 2019. In September 2020, the PSHE curriculum went into effect in England's high schools and elementary schools. with high schools also adapting LGBT PSHE sex education.

Wales similarly announced new regulations about sex education in May 2018, which will also discuss LGBT issues in schools. The regulations, expected to come into force in 2022, will be mandatory from Year 7 (age 11–12).

The Scottish National Party's 2016 manifesto supports sex education classes, as well as "equality training" for teachers, that would cover LGBT issues. In November 2018, the Scottish Government announced the implementation of LGBT-inclusive education in the Scottish school curriculum. The move was welcomed by LGBT activists who cited studies that have found that about 9 in 10 LGBT Scots experience homophobia at school, and 27% reported they had attempted suicide after being bullied.

In December 2021, the Welsh Government's Relationships and Sexuality Education Code was criticised by Welsh Conservatives, who claimed that the Labour-led government was following a "woke ideology" and attempting an "indoctrination of children in gender identity ideology". Ofsted (Office for Standards in Education Children's Services and Skills) assesses the inclusion of LGBT people in policies and the curriculum.

In May 2024, it was formally announced that children under the age of 9 years old within England would be explicitly banned from sex education classes, under newly released guidelines and policies.

== LGBTQ rights movement ==
=== Advocacy organisations ===
The Homosexual Law Reform Society (HLRS) was established on 12 May 1958, in response to the Wolfenden Report's findings and the government's lack of action in light of the report. HLRS lobbied parliament to act upon the Wolfenden Report findings and for the complete decriminalisation of homosexuality. Their multiple campaigns led to the passing of the Sexual Offences Act 1967.

The Campaign for Homosexual Equality (CHE) started in Manchester as the North Western Homosexual Law Reform Committee (NWHLRC). CHE is a democratic voluntary organisation founded in 1964 with the aim of achieving full legal and social equality for LGBT people in England and Wales.

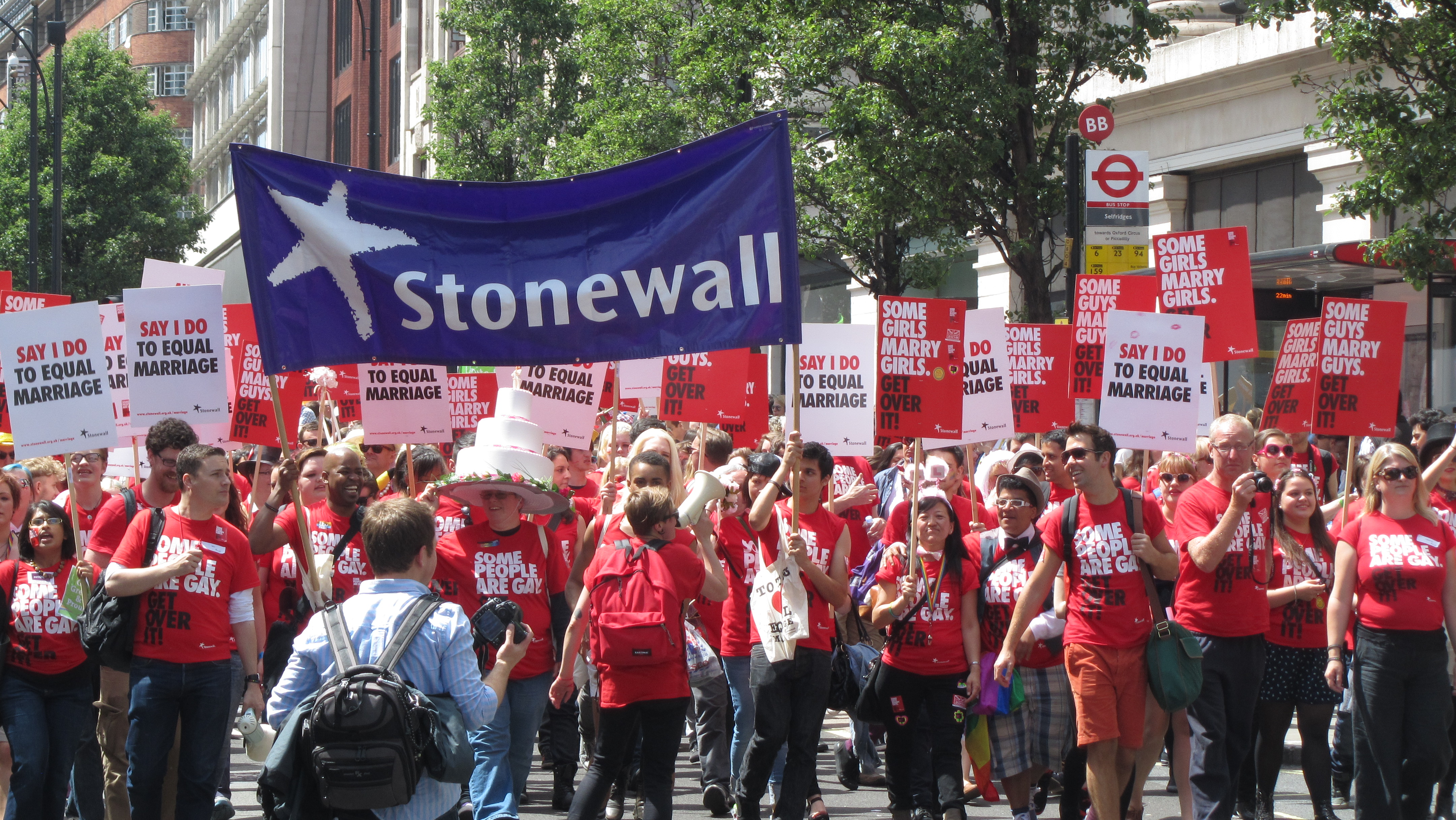
Stonewall at the 2013 Pride in London parade

The Gay Liberation Front notably raised awareness of gay rights, particularly during the 1971 Festival of Light protests. Unlike LGBT movements before it, the GLF shifted focus from primarily advocating for legal reform to actively pursuing a revolutionary transformation in society for LGBT people.

Stonewall is an LGBT equality organisation and is currently the largest in the UK and Europe. On 5 April 1993, Stonewall backed Hugo Greenhalgh, William Parry and Ralph Wilde at the European Court. They argued that the law banning ‘homosexual acts’ for anyone under 21 was a breach of their human rights, as it interfered with their private lives. Stonewall continued to challenge the unequal age of consent for homosexual and bisexual men until the equal age of consent of 16-years-old was finally secured in 2001. Stonewall continues to fight for LGBT equality, particularly in sport, education and the workplace.

The Gay Black Group were founded in 1981 in London. Formed of Black and Asian gay men and lesbians, the group existed to create 'a supportive environment where black gays and lesbians can meet and share their experiences without fear.' The Gay Black Group went on to found the first Black Lesbian and Gay Centre, which ran from 1985 to 2000 at various venues in London. This organisation is an example of a number of historic and contemporary groups designed to cater to Black LGBTQ+ people, such as UK Black Pride today.

LGBT people are allowed to serve openly in the police and, in 1990 the Lesbian and Gay Police Association (LAGPA) was founded to represent the interests of gay, lesbian and bisexual police officers and police staff in the United Kingdom. The LAGPA was replaced by the National LGBT Police Network in 2014.

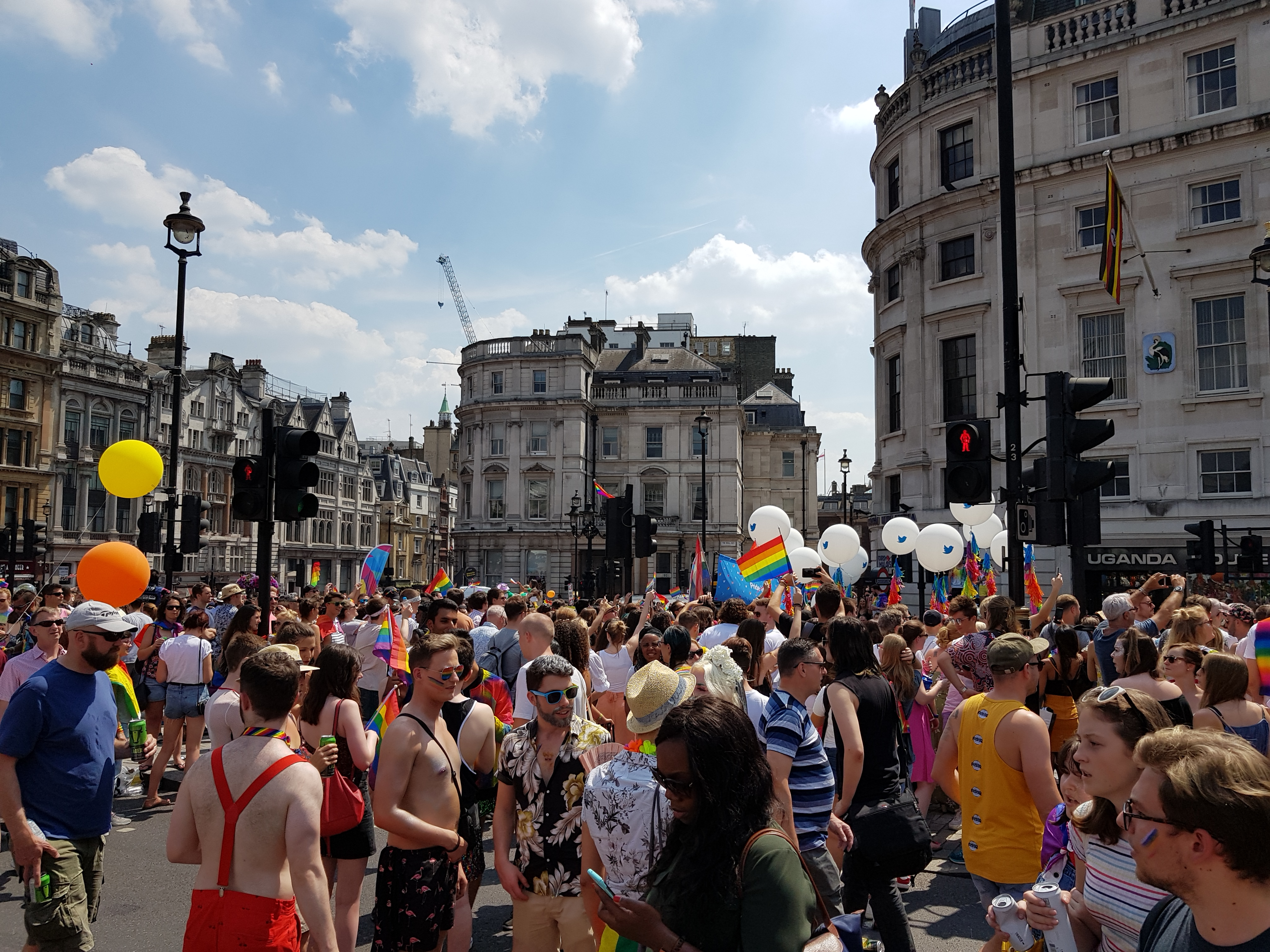
Pride in London 2018

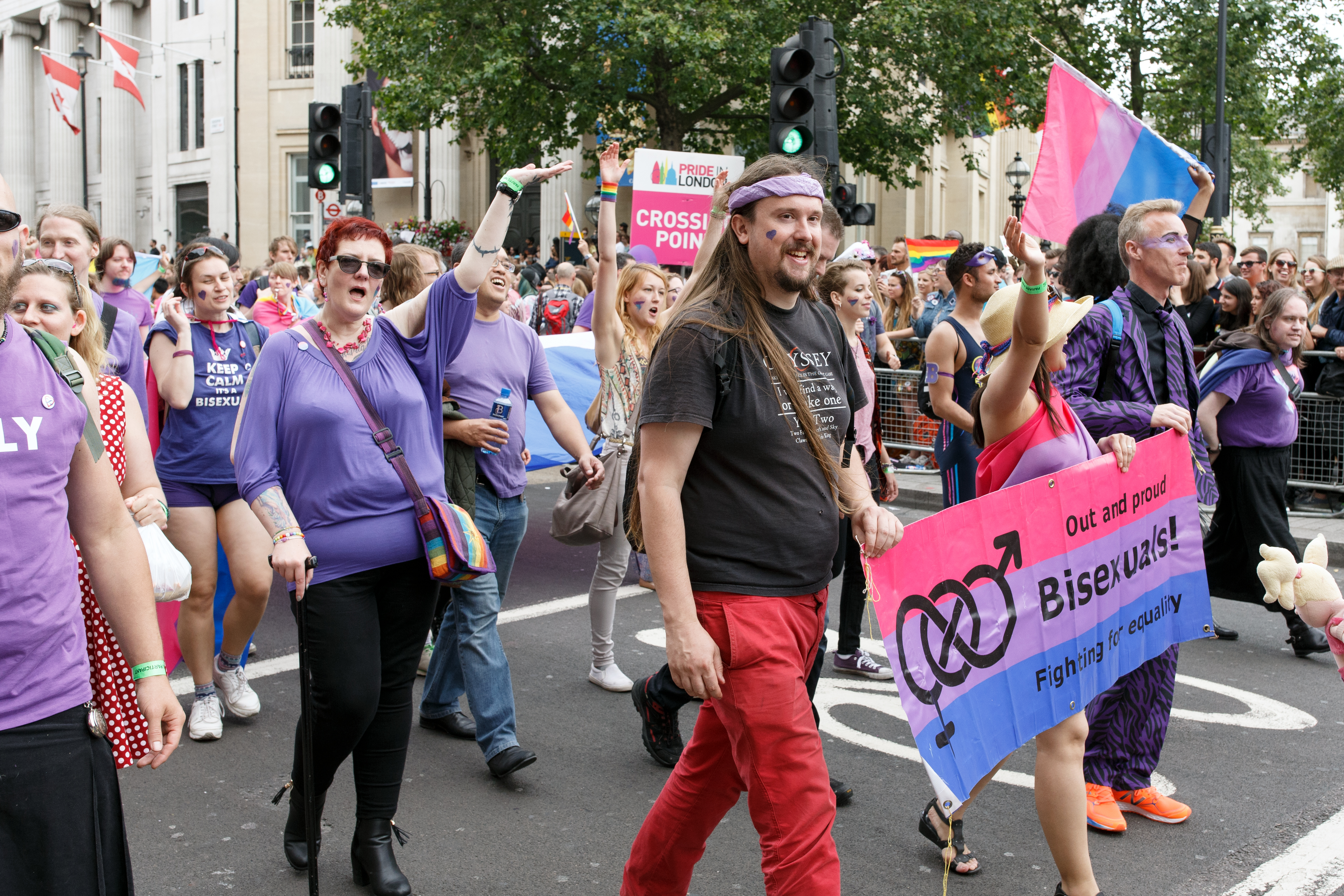
Bisexual people in the parade at Pride in London 2016

=== Pride parades ===
Pride parades have been used by the LGBT community to publicly assert their identity, resist discrimination, and demand social and legal changes to end LGBTQ+ oppression.

On 1 July 1972, the UK's first Pride march was held in London. The date was chosen as the closest Saturday to the anniversary of the Stonewall riots of 28 June 1969. GLF and Campaign for Homosexual Equality were key organisers. Pride in London is the largest and oldest march, and has been organised annually since. Pride Parades are popular summer events in most large cities, and have expanded to smaller cities and towns in recent years. Other notable pride parades include: Brighton Pride, Liverpool Pride, Manchester Pride, and Cardiff Pride.

In May 2020, on the 5th anniversary of the passing of the same-sex marriage referendum in Ireland, Amnesty International, the Irish Congress of Trade Unions, and the Rainbow Project announced plans for mass demonstration in Belfast. This protest was in response to the UK government's failure to allow people to convert their civil unions into marriages despite the legalisation of same-sex marriage in Northern Ireland through the Northern Ireland Act 2019.

== Role of the Council of Europe ==
According to Juris Lavrikovs from ILGA-Europe, the Council of Europe's European Court of Human Rights has been a positive force for LGBT rights, especially with regards to decriminalising same-sex consensual activity, barring discrimination against transgender individuals in employment, equalising the age of consent, enabling LGBT people to serve openly in the military, allowing transgender people the right to marry, employment equality and the including pension right for transgender individuals.

== Demographics ==
The 2021 census found that 3.2% of people in United Kingdom identified as LGBT.

In 2012, the percentage of the UK population identifying as gay, lesbian or bisexual was 1.5% and increased to 2.0% in 2017. The 16 to 24 age group were the most likely to identify as lesbian, gay, or bisexual (LGB) in 2017 with 4.2%.

A 2010 Integrated Household Survey estimated 1.5% of people in the UK identify themselves as gay, lesbian or bisexual – far lower than previous estimates of 5–7%. Interpreting the statistics, an Office for National Statistics (ONS) spokesperson said, "Someone may engage in sexual behaviour with someone of the same sex but still not perceive themselves as gay." According to YouGov, however, studies such as that of the Integrated Household Survey underestimate the true proportion of the population that is LGBT as they use a face-to-face methodology, and non-heterosexual people are less willing to disclose their sexual orientation to an interviewer. YouGov itself estimates, based on its panel, which was inquired via an online questionnaire, that the proportion of LGBT people in the UK is 7%. Estimates of the size of the trans population in the UK is between 65,000 and 300,000. The size of the transsexual population or people experiencing gender dysphoria was estimated at between 2,400 and 10,500. Stonewall concludes that it is hard to define the LGBT population of the UK because some LGBT people are not out.

== Representation ==
=== Census ===
In 2009, the Equality and Human Rights Commission called for the inclusion of a question on sexual orientation in the 2011 census, but this was rejected by the Office for National Statistics who run the census.

In the 2021 census questions on gender, gender identity and sexual orientation were included for the first time. Stonewall supported the move, stating "gathering data on LGBT communities in the UK is a vital step towards building a society where LGBT people are truly accepted, everywhere and by everyone." These provisions were made in the Census (Return Particulars and Removal of Penalties) Act 2019 for England and Wales, and in the Census (Amendment) (Scotland) Act 2019 for Scotland. The guidance to the question "What is your sex?" was subject to a High Court case, led by Fair Play For Women, which found that sex should only be declared per the sex recorded on either a birth certificate or Gender Recognition Certificate, rather than any official document.

=== Media ===
As a national broadcaster, the BBC has been associated with LGBT+ people through its history. In 1938, the BBC broadcast "female impersonator" Douglas Byng, who was closeted at the time of broadcast. In 1957, following the release of the Wolfenden Report, BBC Radio broadcast a special programme titled "The Homosexual Condition" and the subject was discussed on Lifeline and Any Questions? television programmes. In 1965 the BBC postponed the broadcast of The Wednesday Play: Horror of Darkness due to the inclusion of a gay love triangle.

Following the Sexual Offences Act 1967, BBC television representation increased. In 1970, the first ever gay kiss was shown on television, between Ian McKellen and James Laurenson in a performance of Edward II. The first lesbian kiss was shown later in 1974, between Alison Steadman and Myra Frances on the TV show Girl, part of Second City Firsts. In 1987, EastEnders showed the first same-sex kiss on a British soap. In 1995, the show Gaytime TV was broadcast on BBC Two, the first to be primarily targeted at queer audiences.

Music continued to be censored by the BBC throughout the 1970s and 80s. In 1978, Tom Robinson's Glad to be Gay was banned by BBC Radio 1. In 1984, Frankie Goes to Hollywood's Relax was similarly banned from daytime and chart shows.

Mark Drakeford, First Minister at the Welsh Government with his annual message to mark the beginning of LGBT+ History Month 2021.

In 2005, the first LGBT History Month took place, with broadcast on the BBC generally sceptical. The BBC has continued to cover LGBT History Month.

In 2010, the BBC Trust produced a report calling for increased representation of LGBT minorities, including more "incidental homosexuality" in TV programming.

In March 2019, the first LGBT+ correspondent for BBC News, Ben Hunte was hired. In November 2020, it was announced that staff working in news and current affairs at the BBC were banned from attending UK pride marches, so as not to be seen as politically biased (even in a "personal" individual capacity). The BBC later clarified that whilst it was not a blanket ban, staff should seek permission before attending events.

In July 2020, the first same-sex kiss on the children's TV channel CBBC was aired, following a long-running romantic arc between two female characters on the Canadian teen drama series The Next Step.

=== Politics ===
LGBT people have been serving openly in UK politics since the 1970s. In 1972, Sam Green, an openly gay man and member of the Gay Liberation Front, was elected as a member of Durham City Council for the Liberal Party. He has since been described as the first openly gay political candidate in the UK.

The first openly LGBT MP was Maureen Colquhoun (Labour Party, MP 1974–79), who was outed as a Lesbian in 1976. Colquhoun was a left-wing feminist and sought to combat gender inequality. Colquhoun was deselected due to her sexuality and her feminist views in 1977, but this decision was later overturned.

Chris Smith, an MP since 1983 and out since 1984, became the first openly gay secretary of state for culture, media and sport in 1997. Later that year, Angela Eagle came out: the first openly lesbian MP since Maureen Colquhoun.

46 openly LGB MPs were elected at the 2019 General Election. This was one less than in 2017, an increase of five from the 2015 General Election. Of those 46 LGB MPs, 20 were Conservative, 15 Labour, 10 SNP and one independent. Of the main parties, the SNP had the highest proportion of LGB MPs (21%). No openly trans or non-binary MP's were elected in the 2019 general elections.

Nikki Sinclaire (UKIP, 2009–2014) was the first ever trans British parliamentarian as the MEP for West Midlands from 2009 to 2014.

Layla Moran (Liberal Democrats, 2017–present) became the first ever openly pansexual MP in 2017.

In 2021 Owen Hurcum, 23, became the world's first openly non-binary mayor after they were chosen by fellow councillors on Bangor City Council in Gwynedd, Wales. Owen identifies as queer and agender.

On 30 March 2022, Katie Wallis, Conservative MP for Bridgend since 2019, came out as transgender, becoming the first openly transgender MP in the House of Commons.

=== Currency ===
In March 2021, the Bank of England announced that the next £50 note would have Alan Turing displayed on the reverse; it entered circulation on 23 June 2021, reflecting Turing's birth date.

The Royal Mint released a 50 pence coin to celebrate the 50th anniversary of Pride. It was designed by Dominique Holmes, an LGBTQ+ activist. One side features Queen Elizabeth II, and the other side showcases a rainbow design symbolising Pride. The rainbow includes "pride" in the centre and represents Pride in London's values: protest, visibility, unity, and equality.

== Public opinion ==
=== Towards homosexuality ===
Historical attitudes to same-sex sexual relations in Britain (1983–2012)

Raw data

In 1993, Stonewall conducted a survey of gay men and lesbians at work where they found two-thirds of respondents hid their sexuality at work and only 11% of respondents never hid their sexual orientation in the workplace. A follow-up survey done in 2008 found that 20% of gay and lesbian people had experienced bullying at work.

Attitudes towards homosexuality amongst the British public have become more tolerant over time; according to the British Social Attitudes Survey, in 1983 approximately 50% to 70% of respondents of the three major political parties (Conservative, Labour and Liberal Democrat) regarded homosexuality as "always wrong" or "mostly wrong" and in 1993 opposition to homosexuality was reported to have slightly increased amongst all parties. However, by 2003 attitudes had become more tolerant, with 25% to 50% of respondents regarding homosexuality as always or mostly wrong and by 2013, only around 20% to 35% of respondents in each party felt the same way. Liberal Democrat respondents tended to be less likely to regard homosexuality as wrong than Labour or Conservative respondents across each survey. In 2015, a poll carried out by YouGov found that nearly twice as many residents in London believed homosexuality to be "morally wrong" compared to the rest of the UK (29% compared to 15 to 17%). Londoners were also over five times more likely to reject support for a gay child compared to the rest of the UK. A face-to-face survey conducted in 2015 by ICM Research for Channel 4 found that 18% of British Muslims agreed with the statement that homosexuality should be legal in Britain, while 52% disagreed, and 22% neither agreed or disagreed. This was an improvement from a Gallup poll conducted in 2009 which found that British Muslims had zero tolerance towards homosexuality.

An illustration of social attitudes towards homosexuality in the UK was provided in May 2007 in a survey by YouGov. The poll indicated that legislation outlawing discrimination on the grounds of sexual orientation was supported by 90% of British citizens. It also showed positive public perceptions of gay people in particular, but recognised the extent to which prejudice still exists. A poll in June 2009 conducted by Populus for The Times reported that the majority of the public supported same-sex marriage; 61% of respondents agreed that "Gay couples should have an equal right to get married, not just to have civil partnerships". There were few differentials by partisanship.

A more recent opinion poll, conducted in 2017 by Pew Research Center, found that 77% of the British public were in favour of same-sex marriage. Support had increased to 85% according to the 2019 Eurobarometer, which polled all members states of the European Union on the question. The EU average was 69%.

A 2023 YouGov survey of over 4,000 adults in Great Britain indicated that 78% supported the change in law that allowed same-sex couples to marry, whilst 14% opposed the change.

=== Towards transgender people ===
A June 2020 survey by YouGov found that British people tended to support people identifying as the gender of their choice, but did not support making the legal process easier. YouGov's analysis also remarked that British "[p]eople tend to be fine with transgender people using facilities for their new gender, but not if they have not undergone gender reassignment surgery". The survey found women and younger respondents to be more trans-friendly than men and older respondents.

2018–2022 YouGov Survey
	Dec 2018 (%)			June 2020 (%)			May 2022 (%)		
	Agree	Disagree	Not sure	Agree	Disagree	Not sure	Agree	Disagree	Not sure
"A transgender man is a man"	43	32	25	▼41	▲36	23	▼39	▲39	22
"A transgender woman is a woman"	43	32	25	▼40	▲36	23	▼38	▲40	22
"It should be made easier for transgender people to change their legal gender"	28	48	24	28	▼47	25	▼26	▲50	25
"Transgender women should be allowed to participate in women's sport"	27	48	25	▼20	▲55	25	▼16	▲61	22
"Transgender men should be allowed to participate in men's sport"	37	39	25	▼31	▲44	24	▼29	▲48	23
"Transgender women should be able to use the women's toilet"	46	30	23	46	30	23	▼38	▲41	21
"Transgender men should be allowed to use the men's toilet"	48	27	25	▲49	▲28	23	▼42	▲34	23

=== LGBT experience ===
In 2017, 108,000 people participated in the National LGBT Survey, making it one of the biggest survey of LGBT people in the world. LGBT people were found to be less satisfied with life compared to the wider UK population, with trans satisfaction notably lower. 68% of respondents said they avoided holding hands with their same-sex partner in public. 5% of respondents had been offered conversion therapy, with 2% undergoing such therapies. The findings from the National LGBT Survey have been used to inform a 75-point LGBT Action Plan to address the key issues identified, including bringing forward proposals to ban conversion therapy in the UK.

== Right of asylum ==
Current UK policy around the right of asylum for LGBT people requires that they experience a fear of persecution and violence. It being unlawful to be in a same-sex relationship in an asylum seeker's home country is not considered grounds enough to grant asylum in the UK. Prior to 2010, a 'discretion test' was applied, although this was ruled unlawful in the 2010 Supreme Court case HJ and HT v Home Secretary, where the judge ruled that having to hide one's sexuality or gender identity to prevent persecution or violence was enough to meet the threshold for asylum.

In August 2021, the Home Office ordered the deportation of a gay man back to his country of birth Afghanistan - which is back under Taliban control. Homosexuality is a serious criminal offence within Afghanistan law. A review is being conducted to investigate the situation by the shadow Labour Party immigration minister in the House of Commons. A spokesperson for the Home Office later stated that all deportations to Afghanistan had been halted, pending review.

== Summary by legal jurisdiction and territory ==
LGBT rights in:	Same-sex sexual activity	Gender recognition	Recognition of same-sex unions	Same-sex marriage	Same-sex adoption	Military service	Official pardon	Anti-discrimination (sexual orientation)	Anti-discrimination (gender identity)	Other
England and Wales	Legal since 1967; age of consent equalised in 2001	Under the Gender Recognition Act 2004	Civil partnership since 2005	Legal since 2014	Legal since 2005	Since 2000	Since 2017 (Disregards available since 2012)	Bans all discrimination on the grounds of sexual orientation	Bans all discrimination on the grounds of gender identity	Section 28 banning "promotion of same-sex relationships as a pretend family relationship" repealed in 2003
Scotland	Legal since 1981; age of consent equalised in 2001	Under the Gender Recognition Act 2004	Civil partnership since 2005	Legal since 2014	Legal since 2009	Since 2000	Since 2019 (Disregards also available)	Bans all discrimination on the grounds of sexual orientation	Bans all discrimination on the grounds of gender identity	Section 2A banning "promotion of same-sex relationships as a pretend family relationship" repealed in 2000
Northern Ireland	Legal since 1982; age of consent equalised in 2001	Under the Gender Recognition Act 2004	Civil partnership since 2005	Legal since 2020	Legal since 2013	Since 2000	Since 2018 (Disregards also available)	Bans all discrimination on the grounds of sexual orientation	/ Bans discrimination on the grounds of gender identity in employment and vocational training	N/A

=== Crown dependencies ===
LGBT rights in:	Same-sex sexual activity	Gender recognition	Recognition of same-sex unions	Same-sex marriage	Same-sex adoption	Military service	Anti-discrimination (sexual orientation)	Anti-discrimination (gender identity)
Guernsey	Legal since 1983; age of consent equalised in 2012	Since 2007, only allows a new birth certificate to be issued. Does not amend or remove records of existing birth certificates, extension to Alderney and Sark unclear	Since 2012 in Guernsey, 2016 in Alderney and 2020 in Sark	Legal since 2017 in Guernsey, 2018 in Alderney and 2020 in Sark	Legal since 2017	UK responsible for defence	Bans all discrimination on the grounds of sexual orientation	Bans all discrimination on the grounds of "gender reassignment"
Isle of Man	Legal since 1992; age of consent equalised in 2006	Under the Gender Recognition Act 2009	Civil partnership since 2011	Legal since 2016	Legal since 2011	UK responsible for defence	Bans all discrimination on the grounds of sexual orientation	Bans all discrimination on the grounds of "gender reassignment"
Jersey	Legal since 1990; age of consent equalised in 2006	Under the Gender Recognition (Jersey) Law 2010	Civil partnership since 2012	Legal since 2018	Legal since 2012	UK responsible for defence	Bans all discrimination on the grounds of sexual orientation	Bans all discrimination on the grounds of "gender reassignment"

=== Overseas Territories ===
LGBT rights in:	Same-sex sexual activity	Recognition of same-sex unions	Same-sex marriage	Same-sex adoption	Military service	Anti-discrimination (sexual orientation)	Anti-discrimination (gender identity)
Anguilla	Legal since 2001 (Age of consent discrepancy)				UK responsible for defence		
Akrotiri and Dhekelia	Legal since 2000; age of consent equalised in 2003		Legal since 2014		UK responsible for defence	Bans some discrimination on the grounds of sexual orientation	
Bermuda	Legal since 1994; age of consent equalised in 2019	Domestic partnership since 2018	Was legal between November 2018 and March 2022 and between May 2017 and June 2018	Legal since 2015	UK responsible for defence	Bans all discrimination on the grounds of sexual orientation	
British Antarctic Territory	Legal		Legal since 2016		UK responsible for defence		
British Indian Ocean Territory	Legal		Legal since 2014		UK responsible for defence		
British Virgin Islands	Legal since 2001				UK responsible for defence	Bans all discrimination on the grounds of sexual orientation	
Cayman Islands	Legal since 2001 (Age of consent discrepancy)	Civil Partnership since 2020		Legal since 2020	UK responsible for defence		
Falkland Islands	Legal since 1989; age of consent equalised in 2005	Civil partnership since 2017	Legal since 2017	Legal since 2017	UK responsible for defence	Bans all discrimination on the grounds of sexual orientation	
Gibraltar	Legal since 1993; age of consent equalised in 2012	Civil partnership since 2014	Legal since 2016	Legal since 2014	UK responsible for defence	Bans all discrimination on the grounds of sexual orientation	Bans all discrimination on the grounds of "gender reassignment"
Montserrat	Legal since 2000 (Age of consent discrepancy)		(Constitutional ban since 2010)		UK responsible for defence	Bans all discrimination on the grounds of sexual orientation	
Pitcairn Islands	Legal		Legal since 2015	Legal since 2015	UK responsible for defence	Bans all discrimination on the grounds of sexual orientation	
(Ascension Island) Saint Helena, Ascension and Tristan da Cunha	Legal		Legal since 2017	Legal since 2017	UK responsible for defense	Bans all discrimination on the grounds of sexual orientation	Bans all discrimination on the grounds of "gender reassignment"
South Georgia and the South Sandwich Islands	Legal		Legal since 2014		UK responsible for defence		
Turks and Caicos Islands	Legal since 2001 (Age of consent discrepancy)		(Constitutional ban since 2011)		UK responsible for defence	Bans all discrimination on the grounds of sexual orientation	

== Summary table ==
Please note: when a jurisdiction is not specified, the right applies to the whole of the United Kingdom. Does not include the Overseas Territories and the Crown dependencies

Right	Yes/No	Notes
Same-sex sexual activity
Same-sex sexual activity legal	Yes	Since 1967 (England and Wales); Since 1981 (Scotland); Since 1982 (Northern Ireland)
Equal age of consent (16)	Yes	Since 2001
Homosexuality declassified as an illness	Yes	Since 1992
Official pardon	Yes	Since 2017 (England and Wales); Since 2018 (Northern Ireland); Since 2019 (Scotland)
Disregards available	Yes	Since 2012 (England and Wales); Since 2018 (Northern Ireland); Since 2019 (Scotland)
Same-sex relationships
Civil partnerships for same-sex couples (Note: Civil partnerships give most (but not all) of the rights and responsibilities of civil marriage, but there are recognition issues in other countries and with the use of courtesy titles. Civil partnerships can take place on any approved premise in the UK and in approved religious venues in Great Britain (though religious venues are not compelled), but cannot include religious readings, music or symbols. Adultery and non-consummation are also not grounds for the dissolution of a civil partnership. See: "Civil Partnership Act 2004" and "Civil partnership in the United Kingdom") (Note: Civil partnerships were extended to opposite-sex couples in England and Wales on 2 December 2019.)	Yes	Since 2005
Civil partnerships in religious venues	Yes	Since 2011 (England and Wales); Since 2014 (Scotland); Since 2020 (Northern Ireland)
Civil and religious same-sex marriage (Note: Same-sex marriages give all the rights and responsibilities of civil marriage and can be performed on approved premises and religious venues in Great Britain (though no religious or belief body is compelled). Adultery and non-consummation are not grounds for divorce. See: "Marriage (Same Sex Couples) Act 2013", "Marriage and Civil Partnership (Scotland) Act 2014" and "Same-sex marriage in the United Kingdom")	Yes	Since 2014 (England and Wales, and Scotland); Since 2020 (Northern Ireland)
Adoption and family planning
Joint and stepchild adoption for LGBT persons and same-sex couples	Yes	Since 2005 (England and Wales); Since 2009 (Scotland); Since 2013 (Northern Ireland)
Equal access to IVF for all couples and individuals	Yes	Since 2009
Same-sex couples as both parents on a birth certificate	Yes	Since 2009
Altruistic surrogacy for all couples and individuals	Yes	Since 2010
Commercial surrogacy for gay male couples	Yes	Banned for heterosexual couples as well
Military service
LGBT people allowed to serve openly in the military	Yes	Since 2000
Transgender rights
Gender self-identification	No	
Legal recognition of non-binary gender	No	
Right to change legal gender	Yes	Since 2005
Right to change legal gender without having to end marriage (Note: Existing marriages continue where one or both parties change their legal gender and both parties wish to remain married. Civil partnerships continue where only both parties change their gender simultaneously and wish to remain in their civil partnership. See: "Marriage (Same Sex Couples) Act 2013", "Marriage and Civil Partnership (Scotland) Act 2014" and "Same-sex marriage in the United Kingdom")	Yes	Since 2014 (England and Wales, and Scotland); Since 2020 (Northern Ireland)
Transsexualism declassified as an illness	Yes	Since 2002
Discrimination protections
Anti-discrimination laws in all areas on sexual orientation and gender identity (including employment, goods and services, housing, etc.)	Yes / No	Since 2010 (England and Wales, and Scotland); Only limited protections for gender identity in Northern Ireland
Laws against hate speech based on sexual orientation	Yes	Since 2004 (Northern Ireland); Since 2008 (England and Wales); Since 2009 (Scotland)
Laws against hate speech based on gender identity	Yes / No	Since 2009 (Scotland); No laws exist (England and Wales, and Northern Ireland)
Laws against inciting hatred on sexual orientation through an aggravating circumstance	Yes	Since 2004 (Northern Ireland); Since 2008 (England and Wales); Since 2009 (Scotland)
Laws against inciting hatred on gender identity through an aggravating circumstance	Yes / No	Since 2009 (Scotland); No laws exist (England and Wales, and Northern Ireland)
LGBT sex education and relationships taught in schools	Yes / No	Personal, Social, Health and Economic (PSHE) education, which includes sex and relationships, became compulsory for all schools in England in September 2020, though schools in England were previously encouraged to make it compulsory starting in September 2019. Compulsory for all schools in Scotland from 2018, and Wales from 2022; Schools in England must comply with the Equality Act 2010's Public Sector Equality Duty (2012) which includes LGBT equality Ofsted assesses the inclusion of LGBT people in policies and the curriculum
MSMs allowed to donate blood	Yes	Since 2021
Conversion therapy banned	No	Pending at legislative level since 2018, but was blocked in parliament in 2024.
Immigration rights
Immigration equality and rights for LGBT individuals and same-sex couples	Yes	Since 2006
Recognition of sexual orientation and gender identity for asylum requests	Yes / No	Guidelines not applied consistently Some cases recognised since 1999 including that of HJ and HT v Home Secretary; Plans for guidance on asylum claims brought on by sexual orientation but not gender identity
Intersex rights
Legal recognition of intersex people	No	
Intersex human rights	No	

== See also ==
- 1999 London nail bombings
- Anti-transgender movement in the United Kingdom
- David J. Templeton
- History of transgender people in the United Kingdom
- History of violence against LGBT people in the United Kingdom
- Intersex rights in the United Kingdom
- Killing of David Morley
- LGBTQ rights in Northern Ireland
- LGBTQ rights in Scotland
- LGBTQ rights in Wales
- LGBTQ rights in the Commonwealth of Nations
- LGBTQ people in the United Kingdom
- Murder of Brianna Ghey
- Murder of Jody Dobrowski
- Murder of Maxwell Confait
- Murder of Michael Causer
- Timeline of LGBTQ history in the United Kingdom
