= LGBTQ rights in Wales =

- Wales (dark green) within the United Kingdom (light green)
- Legal status: Legal since 1967 with unequal restrictions, age of consent equalised in 2001, restrictions removed in 2003
- Gender identity: Right to change legal gender since 2004
- Military: LGBTQ people allowed to serve openly since 2000
- Discrimination protections: Sexual orientation and gender identity protections

Family rights
- Recognition of relationships: Civil partnerships since 2005; Same-sex marriage since 2014
- Adoption: Full adoption rights since 2005

Lesbian, gay, bisexual, transgender and queer (LGBTQ) rights in Wales are generally in line with the rest of the United Kingdom, which have evolved extensively over time.

== Laws regarding same-sex sexual activity and age of consent ==
The Buggery Act 1533 prohibited anal sex with individuals committing the offence subject to a death sentence in England. The Laws in Wales Acts 1535 and 1542 extended all acts of the Parliament of England to Wales. The Offences Against the Person Act 1861 replaced this with a minimum of ten years' imprisonment.

The Labouchère Amendment, contained within the Criminal Law Amendment Act 1885, criminalised gross indecency between two men, covering all sexual acts between men short of anal sex. The Sexual Offences Act 1956 consolidated and replaced existing legislation concerning sexual offences.

The Sexual Offences Act 1967 decriminalised homosexual acts between two men in private England and Wales. The act did not enable three or more men having sex together in private. The Criminal Justice and Public Order Act 1994 lowered the age of consent for sex between two men from 21 to 18. The Sexual Offences (Amendment) Act 2000 reduced the age of consent for sex between two men from 18 to 16. Sexual Offences Act 2003 removed the restriction on three or more men having sex in private.

== Recognition of same-sex relationships ==
=== Civil partnerships ===
The Civil Partnership Act 2004 enabled same-sex couples in England and Wales to have civil partnerships. The first civil partnership ceremonies in Wales took place in December 2005.

=== Same-sex marriage ===
The Nullity of Marriage Act 1971 explicitly prohibited marriages for same-sex couples.

The Marriage (Same Sex Couples) Act 2013 enabled same-sex couples in England and Wales to have marriages. The first same-sex weddings in Wales took place in March 2014.

== Adoption and parenting rights ==
Historically only married couples could adopt children, and same-sex couples and single people were able to adopt. The Adoption and Children Act 2002 enabled unmarried couples, same-sex and otherwise, to adopt children.

== Discrimination protections ==
The Equality Act 2010 prohibits discrimination, harassment and victimisation on the basis of has covered gender reassignment, marriage and civil partnership, and sexual orientation alongside a collection of other characteristics. The act outlaws discrimination, harassment and victimisation on the basis of perception and on the basis of association.

== Gender recognition certificates ==
Under the Gender Recognition Act 2004, transgender people in Wales may apply for a gender recognition certificate.

In 2023, the Welsh Government formally requested that the Senedd be given the powers to reform the process as it applies to Wales. The Secretary of State for Wales rejected this request.

== Transgender health care ==
Historically, adult patients in Wales were referred to clinics in London to receive transgender health care. The Welsh Gender Service was established in 2019 to provide access to certain transgender health care for patients without having to England. As of 2026, patients are still referred to England for gender-affirming surgery. The clinic is run by Cardiff and Vale University Health Board.

As of 2024, Wales does not have a gender clinic for children with such patients continuing to have to travel to England.

== School bullying and school support for LGBTQ pupils ==
Schools and colleges have been repeatedly criticised by Estyn, the education inspectorate, for not supporting their LGBTQ pupils and for homophobic, biphobic and transphobic bullying being normalised.

In 2023, the Welsh Government published guidance for schools for supporting transgender pupils.

== Blood donation by men who have sex with men ==
Historically, the National Blood Authority had a lifetime ban on men who have sex with men from donating blood, in response to the HIV/AIDS epidemic.

The Welsh Blood Service was established in 1999, but only covering South Wales. In 2016, the remit of the Welsh Blood Service was expanded to include North Wales.

In 2011, the lifetime ban was reduced to a period of 12 months of abstention from sex. In 2017, the required period of abstention was reduced to three months. In 2021, the Welsh Blood Service established fully gender-neutral eligibility criteria, with anyone who has had anal sex with new or multiple partners in the last three months being required to wait three months to donate.

== Hate crime laws ==
Under the Crime and Policing Act 2026, hate crimes which target individuals based on their sexual orientation or gender reassignment are aggravated offences.

== Sex education ==
Section 28 of the Local Government Act 1988 stated that local education authorities should not "intentionally promote homosexuality or publish material with the intention of promoting homosexuality". This was repealed by the Local Government Act 2003.

Sex education is now mandatory for children under the Curriculum for Wales, without a right for parents to withdraw their children. The new curriculum contains content on gender identity and sexuality. The policy was unsuccessfully legally challenged.

In 2013, the British Humanists Association criticised certain schools in Wales for still having policies based on section 28 of the Local Government Act 1988.

Estyn has criticised schools for providing inconsistent sex education.

== Living conditions and culture ==
In 1985, the first pride march in Cardiff happened. Since 1999, Pride Cymru, a pride march in Cardiff, has occurred annually.

The BBC has reported that a number of speakers of the Welsh language have adopted nhw as a gender-neutral pronoun for people with non-binary gender.

== See also ==
- Intersex rights in the United Kingdom
- LGBT Network
- LGBTQ rights by country or territory
- LGBTQ rights in Europe
- LGBTQ rights in the United Kingdom
- LGBTQ rights in Scotland
- LGBTQ rights in Northern Ireland
- Transgender rights in the United Kingdom
- Same-sex marriage in the United Kingdom
