= Perthshire Pride =

Annual LGBT event in Perth, Scotland

Perthshire Pride is an annual lesbian, gay, bisexual, and transgender (LGBT) pride festival held in Perth, Scotland. In 2019, around 6,000 people attended Perthshire Pride and the event was officially opened by Sir Ian McKellen.

== History ==
Perthshire Pride was established in 2018 and was attended by 3000 people. Rev Scott Burton opened the inaugural Perthshire Pride event and apologised to the LGBT+ community on behalf of the Church of Scotland for the historic "cruelty and injustice" the LGBT+ community has experienced over the years. Featured performances and speakers included Deputy First Minister of Scotland John Swinney, Councillor Willie Wilson, Molly Macdonald, Perth Amateur Operatic Society and Scarlet Skylar Rae.
