= Same-sex adoption in the United Kingdom =

Same-sex couples in the United Kingdom (not including Scotland) have had the right to adopt since 2002, following the Adoption and Children Act 2002.

== Legalisation ==
In the Adoption and Children Act 2002, Parliament provided that an application to adopt a child in England and Wales could be made by either a single person or a couple. The previous condition that the couple be married was dropped, thus allowing a same-sex couple to apply. The Lords rejected the proposal on one occasion before it was passed. Supporters of the move in Parliament stressed that adoption was not a "gay right", but one of providing as many children as possible with a stable family environment, rather than seeing them kept in care. Opponents raised doubts over the stability of relationships outside marriage, and how instability would impact on the welfare of adopted children. Similar legislation was adopted in Scotland, which came into effect on 28 September 2009.

== Disputes ==
The introduction of the Equality Act (Sexual Orientation) Regulations on 30 April 2007 was controversial and a dispute arose between the Government and the Roman Catholic Church in England and Wales over exemptions for Catholic adoption agencies. Archbishop Vincent Nichols of Birmingham declared his opposition to the legislation, saying that it contradicted the Catholic Church's "moral values". He supported efforts to have Catholic adoption agencies exempted from sexual orientation regulations, which were ultimately successful in a judgement given on 17 March 2010.

== Statistics ==
In 2016, 9.6% of all adoptions in England involved same-sex couples. This was an increase from 8.4% the previous year. In 2018, about 450 of the 3,820 adoptions (about 12%) in England involved same-sex couples.
