= Criminal Law Amendment Act =

Stock short title used for legislation

Criminal Law Amendment Act (with its many variations) is a stock short title used for legislation in the United Kingdom, the Republic of Ireland, Canada, India, Pakistan and South Africa which amends the criminal law (including both substantive and procedural aspects of that law). It tends to be used for Acts that do not have a single cohesive subject matter.

The Bill for an Act with this short title will have been known as a Criminal Law Amendment Bill during its passage through Parliament.

Criminal Law Amendment Acts may be a generic name either for legislation bearing that short title or for all legislation which amends the criminal law. In the United Kingdom, it is a term of art.

See also Criminal Justice Act and Criminal Law Act.

== List ==
=== United Kingdom ===
- The Criminal Law Amendment Act 1867 (30 & 31 Vict. c. 35)
- The Criminal Law Amendment Act 1871 (34 & 35 Vict. c. 32)
- The Criminal Law Amendment Act 1885 (48 & 49 Vict. c. 69), an Act of Parliament of the United Kingdom which raised the age of consent, delineated the penalties for sexual offences against women and minors and strengthened existing legislation against brothels
- The Criminal Law Amendment Act 1912 (2 & 3 Geo. 5. c. 20) (repealed for England and Wales by the Sexual Offences Act 1956, s.51 & Sch.4; and for Scotland by the Sexual Offences (Scotland) Act 1976, s.21(2) & Sch.2)

The Criminal Law Amendment Acts 1885 to 1912 means the Criminal Law Amendment Act 1885 and the Criminal Law Amendment Act 1912.

==== Northern Ireland ====
- The Criminal Law Amendment Act (Northern Ireland) 1923 (c. 8) (N.I.)
- The Criminal Law and Prevention of Crime (Amendment) Act 1930 (c. 3) (N.I.)

The Criminal Law Amendment Acts (Northern Ireland)

- The Criminal Law Amendment Acts (Northern Ireland) 1885 to 1923 means the Criminal Law Amendment Acts 1885 to 1912 and the Criminal Law Amendment Act (Northern Ireland) 1923 (to the extent to which they apply to Northern Ireland).
- The Criminal Law Amendment Acts (Northern Ireland) 1885 to 1930 means the Criminal Law Amendment Acts (Northern Ireland) 1885 to 1923, and section one of the Criminal Law and Prevention of Crime (Amendment) Act (Northern Ireland) 1930.

Criminal Law (Amendment) Order

An Orders in Council with this title has been passed. The change in nomenclature is due to the demise of the Parliament of Northern Ireland and the imposition of direct rule. This orders is considered to be primary legislation.

- The Criminal Law (Amendment) (Northern Ireland) Order 1977 (SI 1977/1249 (N.I. 16))

=== Republic of Ireland ===
- The Criminal Law Amendment Act 1935 (No.6)

=== Canada ===
- The Criminal Law Amendment Act, 1968-69 (S.C. 1968–69, c. 38)* an Act of Parliament of Canada whose provisions included, among other things, the decriminalization of homosexual acts between consenting adults, the legalization of contraception, abortion and lotteries, new gun ownership restrictions ...
- The Criminal Law Amendment Act, 2001 (2002, c.13)

=== India ===
- The Criminal Law Amendment Act, 1932 (Act No.32)
- The Criminal Law Amendment Act, 1938 (Act No.20)
- The Criminal Law Amendment Act, 1961 (Act No.23)
- The Criminal Law (Second Amendment) Act, 1983 (Act No. 46)
- The Criminal Law (Amendment) Act, 2013 (No. 10)
- The Criminal Law (Amendment) Act, 2018 (No. 22)

=== Pakistan ===
- The Criminal Law (Amendment) Act, 2004
- The Criminal Law (Amendment) Act, 2010
- The Criminal Law Amendment Act, 2022 (Act No.73)

=== South Africa ===
- The Riotous Assemblies and Criminal Law Amendment Act, 1914 (No. 27 of 1914)
- The Criminal Law Amendment Act, 1953 (No. 8 of 1953)
- The Criminal Law Amendment Act, 1959 (No. 16 of 1959)
- The Criminal Law Further Amendment Act, 1959 (No. 75 of 1959)
- The Criminal Law Amendment Act, 1983 (No. 59 of 1983)
- The Criminal Law Amendment Act, 1988 (No. 1 of 1988)
- The Criminal Law and the Criminal Procedure Act Amendment Act, 1989 (No. 39 of 1989)
- The Criminal Law Amendment Act, 1990 (No. 107 of 1990)
- The Criminal Law Amendment Act, 1991 (No. 135 of 1991)
- The Criminal Law Amendment Act, 1992 (No. 4 of 1992)
- The Criminal Law Second Amendment Act, 1992 (No. 126 of 1992)
- The Criminal Law Amendment Act, 1997 (No. 105 of 1997)
- The Criminal Law (Sexual Offences and Related Matters) Amendment Act, 2007 (No. 32 of 2007)
- The Criminal Law (Sentencing) Amendment Act, 2007 (No. 38 of 2007)
- The Criminal Law (Forensic Procedures) Amendment Act, 2010 (No. 6 of 2010)
- The Criminal Law (Forensic Procedures) Amendment Act, 2013 (No. 37 of 2013)

== See also ==
- List of short titles
