= Vagrancy Act 1898 =

Act of the Parliament of the United Kingdom

Vagrancy Act 1898 (Note: Section 2(2).)
- Act of Parliament
- Parliament of the United Kingdom
- Long title: An Act to amend the Vagrancy Act, 1824
- Citation: 61 & 62 Vict. c. 39
- Introduced by: Sir Matthew Ridley, Home Secretary
- Territorial extent: England and Wales (Note: Section 2(1).); Scotland; Ireland; (Note: Extended by the Criminal Law Amendment Act 1912 (2 & 3 Geo. 5. c. 20).)

Dates
- Royal assent: 12 August 1898
- Commencement: 12 October 1898
- Repealed: England and Wales: 1 January 1957; Scotland: 1 May 2004 (Note: The Sexual Offences Act 2003 (Commencement) (Scotland) Order 2004 (SI 2004/138).)

Other legislation
- Amends: Vagrancy Act 1824
- Amended by: Criminal Law Amendment Act 1912
- Repealed by: England and Wales: Sexual Offences Act 1956; Scotland: Sexual Offences Act 2003
- Relates to: Criminal Law Amendment Act 1912

Status: Repealed

Text of statute as originally enacted

The Vagrancy Act 1898 (61 & 62 Vict. c. 39) was an act of the Parliament of the United Kingdom that criminalised men who lived off the earnings of prostitution (pimping) and who solicited in public places in England and Wales. The bill was generally viewed as successful in its impact, leading to the similar Immoral Traffic (Scotland) Act 1902 (2 Edw. 7. c. 11).

== Introduction ==
Lord Salisbury, a Conservative and the British Prime Minister, was constantly aware of his party's enemy, Socialism, "Whenever an Act for the benefit of the people is introduced."

Acting on the Parliamentary Select Committee's Report (1896) there were modifications to the Poor Laws. Already torn apart by the new secular dilemmas in education, the Cabinet juggled competing priorities as they considered the new social policy. Henry Chaplin, President of the Local Government Board, implemented the bill in 1899, his committee reported that "All needy and deserving poor over the age of 65 should receive 5 s. per week under strict conditions." On 14 March 1898, Home Secretary Sir Matthew Ridley moved a bill to amend the Vagrancy Act 1824. He described "rogues and vagabonds," as "bullies" and "enemies of society," rejoining with "those men who lived by the disgraceful earnings of the women whom they consorted with and controlled." Vagrancy became a police matter.

The bill was read a second time on 23 June 1898, passing a third reading on 21 July. One week later, it was moved into committee by the Lords. On return to the Commons, Sir Charles Dilke, the radical MP, moved a procedural amendment, "A clause dealing, not simply with the matters of this Bill in particular, but dealing with the whole of the Vagrancy Acts."

== Background ==
Defending beggars and homelessness became one of Liberal leader William Gladstone's social concerns expressed in speeches, legislation, public oratory, and the opening of new hospitals, schools and workhouses. However, liberalism did not recognise poverty as a major causal factor in vagrancy or indeed any crime. Criminals were lesser and incapable therefore of rational thought, let alone legal and moral responsibility for their actions. The essential Protestant nature of the vagrancy offence meant violations were met by punishment such as, beatings, floggings, and whippings before they were sent home, without the adequate realisation that industrialisation caused migration across communities from the countryside.

From the 1860s onwards the tramping artisan began to disappear, as those in search of work intensified the experience to gain finality to it; whereas tramps came at last to accept, however reluctantly, their lot in life as "down and outs." In 1897, only 20% of "discharged soldiers" could justify their claim to be migrant workers to the Royal Commission and only 3% could in the workhouse population. Thus the Report of Minority Opinion was condemned in a scathing critique by Fabian Socialists, Beatrice and Sidney Webb, in their work The Break-Up of the Poor Law (1909), in which they described how only 3% could actually be categorised as "professional tramps." The Fabian emphasis fell on assessing at least between 1/3 and 2/3 of all vagrants as "deserving" of classification as "genuine workmen" and therefore respectability. This was determined by the economic climate: if prosperity rose and then the numbers in work increased, the number of assessed casuals would shrink. But more Liberal gentlemen earlier in the period could hardly discern any deserving case in the East End. Hugh Owen, Secretary to the Local Government Board (1871), and Edward Denison (1867) were both strongly opposed to casualism. Both men were disparaging of the casual poor.

== Provisions ==
The Vagrancy Act 1824 (5 Geo. 4. c. 83) defined persistent vagrants to be "incorrigible rogues." A justice of the Quarter Session could order whipping, when and if "in their discretion shall deem to be expedient." The 1890s witnessed a crackdown. Police statements were the only witness statements taken in such cases; women were convicted after only a short trial; and hardly any proof by way of evidence was required for submission. But by 1900 only 165 had been prosecuted under the new act, whereas 7,415 women were convicted for solicitation in the same period. By 1917 police were systematically arresting and fingerprinting women, even if just standing around (loitering) without much intent. The Victorian "annoyance clause," was lifted making it easier for police to prosecute.

Offences were defined as begging with the causes for prosecution including: wandering abroad or being in any street to beg or gather alms, or causing or procuring any child so to do. Sections 3 and 4 of the Vagrancy Act 1824 relate to the offence when committed by a person who has been convicted as an idle and disorderly person. The Vagrancy Act 1824 once again stood to penalise rough-sleepers, and punish drunkards, prostitutes, and sturdy beggars. It seems as though they were overwhelmingly concentrated in the big cities as that is where the data has survived. London, Birmingham, Manchester, Liverpool, Leeds, Newcastle, Bristol in England are the only areas with any correlated data in Victorian period for homelessness. Section 10 that punished by "whipping" was repealed, despite the fact that the government reported that the punishment was used only on seven occasions in five years, and, as Lord Belper put it, "the offences were of such a seriously indecent character that I am sure your Lordships would not wish that the power should be parted with in such cases." During debates one MP, Mr. Pickersgill, called the bill's punishment "capricious" declaring that no fewer than 1,265 persons were convicted in 1895. There was concern expressed among Liberal MPs that the legislation should amend the need "for some poor insane wretch to be flogged." Sir Matthew Ridley accepted the Lords amendment. Much later a Liberal parliament went a step further in formalising these offences in the Criminal Law Amendment Act 1912 (2 & 3 Geo. 5. c. 20).

== Consequences ==
The fin de siècle ushered in an era of libertines and sexual freedom. To combat the excesses, a new offence of "indecent exposure" became the legacy of the Lords amendment. The Home Secretary did consider amendments, its main purposes being to update the vagrancy legislation in the whole bill; living "on the prostitution of a woman" remained an offence. On 8 May 1899 two men from Bristol were prosecuted for this new offence. Yet in 1901 a new Home Secretary, C. T. Ritchie, wrote "To get rid of prostitution by legal enactment or by official interposition is out of the question so long as human nature is what it is, you will never be entirely rid of it."

One of the results of Vagrancy Act 1898 was a growth in social purity legislation, including feminist campaigns to protect women and children against trafficking. Under section 21 of the Summary Jurisdiction (Married Women) Act 1879 any convicted offender who continued in cohabitation was granted an order for separation on the ground of desertion. A trafficker of women and children was deemed by the law as "a rogue and vagabond" under the Vagrancy Act 1898. The Committee for Outdoor Relief (COS) were committed to reform: it included two East End MPs, A. C. Crowder, MP for St George's-in-the-East, and W. A. Bailward, MP for Bethnal Green, both Guardians to the Poor Law Unions. The Brixworth Board elected Albert Fell MP. The proportion of homeless for 100,000 had continued to rise to about 400 per 100,000. But the service delivery was haphazard. And the 1895 Report by Sir Wilfred Chance recommended "strict" Unions. Then the High Court ruled that a person was not a vagrant if they were collecting money or food for strikers and their families (Pointon v Hill (1884) 12 QBD 306).

By 1902 the act was deemed to be working well, and so it was sent up to the Lords to be extended to Scotland. Lord Kinnaird said "it will be of great value in reducing this nefarious traffic by making provision for the punishment of offenders." Lord Balfour of Burleigh, the Conservative Secretary of State for Scotland had no objection to a second reading to "compel extremely undesirable persons to leave the Metropolis" of Glasgow. The law was called the Immoral Traffic (Scotland) Act 1902 (2 Edw. 7. c. 11) but performed a similar role as the Vagrancy Act. Subsequent amendments included the White Slave Traffic Bill of 1910. On 25 November 1912, George Greenwood MP asked the Liberal Home Secretary if the Vagrancy Act could be amended of the s.10, 1824 act. In a frenzied atmosphere of radicalism, Rescue Societies and suffragists posing a danger to British society, Reginald McKenna answered that the punishment of flogging would be determined by the Court of Appeal and pending the decision the floggings would be suspended. Trafficking white slaves was later outlawed by the Treaty of Versailles and League of Nations Charter, although this was already law in England under the Criminal Law Amendment Act 1912 (2 & 3 Geo. 5. c. 20). However, many MPs (e.g. Charles Hopwood, MP for Stockport) believed the legislation of 1912 to be repressive. They attempted to stiffen the legislation and uphold marriage instead of prostitution and homosexuality.

== Subsequent developments ==
The whole act was repealed for England and Wales by section 51 of, and the fourth schedule to, the Sexual Offences Act 1956 (4 & 5 Eliz. 2. c. 69), which came into force on 1 January 1957.

The whole act was repealed for Scotland by section 140 of, and schedule 7 to , the Sexual Offences Act 2003, which came into force on 1 May 2004.
