= List of acts of the Parliament of the United Kingdom from 1912 =

This is a complete list of acts of the Parliament of the United Kingdom for the year 1912.

Note that the first parliament of the United Kingdom was held in 1801; parliaments between 1707 and 1800 were either parliaments of Great Britain or of Ireland). For acts passed up until 1707, see the list of acts of the Parliament of England and the list of acts of the Parliament of Scotland. For acts passed from 1707 to 1800, see the list of acts of the Parliament of Great Britain. See also the list of acts of the Parliament of Ireland.

For acts of the devolved parliaments and assemblies in the United Kingdom, see the list of acts of the Scottish Parliament, the list of acts of the Northern Ireland Assembly, and the list of acts and measures of Senedd Cymru; see also the list of acts of the Parliament of Northern Ireland.

The number shown after each act's title is its chapter number. Acts passed before 1963 are cited using this number, preceded by the year(s) of the reign during which the relevant parliamentary session was held; thus the Union with Ireland Act 1800 is cited as "39 & 40 Geo. 3 c. 67", meaning the 67th act passed during the session that started in the 39th year of the reign of George III and which finished in the 40th year of that reign. Note that the modern convention is to use Arabic numerals in citations (thus "41 Geo. 3" rather than "41 Geo. III"). Acts of the last session of the Parliament of Great Britain and the first session of the Parliament of the United Kingdom are both cited as "41 Geo. 3". Acts passed from 1963 onwards are simply cited by calendar year and chapter number.

== 2 & 3 Geo. 5 ==
The second session of the 30th Parliament of the United Kingdom, which met from 14 February 1912 until 7 March 1913.

This session was also traditionally cited as 2 & 3 G. 5.

=== Public general acts ===
Short title	Citation	Royal assent
Long title
Consolidated Fund (No. 1) Act 1912 (repealed)	2 & 3 Geo. 5. c. 1	28 March 1912
An Act to apply certain sums out of the Consolidated Fund to the service of the years ending on the thirty-first day of March one thousand nine hundred and eleven, one thousand nine hundred and twelve, and one thousand nine hundred and thirteen. (Repealed by Statute Law Revision Act 1927 (17 & 18 Geo. 5. c. 42))
Coal Mines (Minimum Wage) Act 1912 (repealed)	2 & 3 Geo. 5. c. 2	29 March 1912
An Act to provide a Minimum Wage in the case of Workmen employed underground in Coal Mines (including Mines of Stratified Ironstone), and for purposes incidental thereto. (Repealed by Statute Law Revision Act 1950 (14 Geo. 6. c. 6))
Shops Act 1912 (repealed)	2 & 3 Geo. 5. c. 3	29 March 1912
An Act to consolidate the Shops Regulation Acts, 1892 to 1911. (Repealed for England and Wales and Scotland by Shops Act 1950 (14 Geo. 6. c. 28) and for Northern Ireland by Shops Act (Northern Ireland) 1946 (c. 7 (N.I.)))
Metropolitan Police Act 1912 (repealed)	2 & 3 Geo. 5. c. 4	29 March 1912
An Act to amend section twenty-three of the Metropolitan Police Act, 1829, (Note: Metropolitan Police Act 1829 (10 Geo. 4. c. 44)) with respect to the Limit imposed by that section as amended by subsequent enactments on the Amount to be provided annually for the purposes of the Metropolitan Police. (Repealed by Local Government Act 1929 (19 & 20 Geo. 5. c. 17))
Army (Annual) Act 1912 (repealed)	2 & 3 Geo. 5. c. 5	30 April 1912
An Act to provide, during Twelve Months, for the Discipline and Regulation of the Army. (Repealed by Statute Law Revision Act 1927 (17 & 18 Geo. 5. c. 42), Statute Law Revision Act 1953 (2 & 3 Eliz. 2. c. 5) and Revision of the Army and Air Force Acts (Transitional Provisions) Act 1955 (3 & 4 Eliz. 2. c. 20))
Government of India Act 1912 (repealed)	2 & 3 Geo. 5. c. 6	25 June 1912
An Act to make such amendments in the Law relating to the Government of India as are consequential on the appointment of a separate Governor of Fort William in Bengal, and other administrative changes in the local government of India. (Repealed by Government of India Act 1915 (5 & 6 Geo. 5. c. 61))
Appropriation Act 1912 (repealed)	2 & 3 Geo. 5. c. 7	7 August 1912
An Act to apply a sum out of the Consolidated Fund to the service of the year ending on the thirty-first day of March one thousand nine hundred and thirteen, and to appropriate the Supplies granted in this Session of Parliament. (Repealed by Statute Law Revision Act 1927 (17 & 18 Geo. 5. c. 42))
Finance Act 1912 (repealed)	2 & 3 Geo. 5. c. 8	7 August 1912
An Act to grant certain duties of Customs and Inland Revenue, to alter other duties, and to amend the Law relating to Customs and Inland Revenue (including Excise) and the National Debt, and to make other provisions for the financial arrangements of the year. (Repealed by Finance (No. 2) Act 1915 (5 & 6 Geo. 5. c. 89), Income Tax Act 1918 (8 & 9 Geo. 5. c. 40), Finance Act 1920 (10 & 11 Geo. 5. c. 18), Statute Law Revision Act 1927 (17 & 18 Geo. 5. c. 42), Customs and Excise Act 1952 (15 & 16 Geo. 6 & 1 Eliz. 2. c. 44), Finance Act 1959 (7 & 8 Eliz. 2. c. 58), Finance Act 1967 (c. 54) and Finance Act 1975 (c. 7))
Isle of Man (Customs) Act 1912 (repealed)	2 & 3 Geo. 5. c. 9	7 August 1912
An Act to amend the Law with respect to Customs in the Isle of Man. (Repealed by Statute Law Revision Act 1927 (17 & 18 Geo. 5. c. 42))
Seal Fisheries (North Pacific) Act 1912 (repealed)	2 & 3 Geo. 5. c. 10	7 August 1912
An Act to make such provisions with respect to the prohibition of catching Seals and Sea Otters in certain parts of the Pacific Ocean, and for the enforcement of such prohibitions as are necessary to carry out a Convention between His Majesty the King and the United States of America, the Emperor of Japan, and the Emperor of All the Russias. (Repealed by Marine and Coastal Access Act 2009 (c. 23))
Public Works Loans Act 1912 (repealed)	2 & 3 Geo. 5. c. 11	7 August 1912
An Act to grant Money for the purpose of certain Local Loans out of the Local Loans Fund, and for other purposes relating to Local Loans. (Repealed by Statute Law Revision Act 1927 (17 & 18 Geo. 5. c. 42))
Elementary School Teachers (Superannuation) Act 1912	2 & 3 Geo. 5. c. 12	7 August 1912
An Act to amend the Elementary School Teachers (Superannuation) Act, 1898, (Note: Elementary School Teachers (Superannuation) Act 1898 (61 & 62 Vict. c. 57)) as originally enacted and as applied by any other Act. (Repealed for Scotland by Education (Scotland) (Superannuation) Act 1919 (9 & 10 Geo. 5. c. 17))
London Institution (Transfer) Act 1912 (repealed)	2 & 3 Geo. 5. c. 13	13 December 1912
An Act to provide for the transfer to the Commissioners of Works of certain property of the London Institution for the purposes of a School of Oriental Studies, and for the dissolution of the Institution, and for purposes in connection therewith. (Repealed by Statute Law (Repeals) Act 1973 (c. 39))
Protection of Animals (Scotland) Act 1912	2 & 3 Geo. 5. c. 14	13 December 1912
An Act to consolidate and amend enactments relating to Animals and Knackers; and to make further provision with respect thereto.
Marriages in Japan (Validity) Act 1912 (repealed)	2 & 3 Geo. 5. c. 15	13 December 1912
An Act to remove doubts as to the validity of certain Marriages solemnized in the Empire of Japan. (Repealed by Foreign Marriage (Amendment) Act 1988 (c. 44))
Royal Scottish Museum (Extension) Act 1912 (repealed)	2 & 3 Geo. 5. c. 16	13 December 1912
An Act to make provision for the Acquisition of Property for the Extension of the Royal Scottish Museum at Edinburgh. (Repealed by Statute Law Revision Act 1927 (17 & 18 Geo. 5. c. 42))
Protection of Animals Act (1911) Amendment Act 1912 (repealed)	2 & 3 Geo. 5. c. 17	13 December 1912
An Act to amend the Protection of Animals Act, 1911, (Note: Protection of Animals Act 1911 (1 & 2 Geo. 5. c. 27)) in respect of its Imprisonment Penalty. (Repealed by Protection of Animals (Penalties) Act 1987 (c. 35))
Expiring Laws Continuance Act 1912 (repealed)	2 & 3 Geo. 5. c. 18	13 December 1912
An Act to continue various Expiring Laws. (Repealed by Statute Law Revision Act 1927 (17 & 18 Geo. 5. c. 42))
Light Railways Act 1912	2 & 3 Geo. 5. c. 19	13 December 1912
An Act to continue and amend the Light Railways Act, 1896. (Note: Light Railways Act 1896 (59 & 60 Vict. c. 48)) (Repealed for England and Wales by Transport and Works Act 1992 (c. 42))
Criminal Law Amendment Act 1912	2 & 3 Geo. 5. c. 20	13 December 1912
An Act to amend the Criminal Law Amendment Act, 1885, (Note: Criminal Law Amendment Act 1885 (48 & 49 Vict. c. 69)) the Vagrancy Act, 1898, (Note: Vagrancy Act 1898 (61 & 62 Vict. c. 39)) and the Immoral Traffic (Scotland) Act, 1902. (Note: Immoral Traffic (Scotland) Act 1902 (2 Edw. 7. c. 11)) (Repealed for England and Wales by Sexual Offences Act 1956 (4 & 5 Eliz. 2. c. 69) and for Scotland by Sexual Offences (Scotland) Act 1976 (c. 67))

=== Local acts ===
Short title	Citation	Royal assent
Long title
Central Argentine Railway Limited Act 1912	2 & 3 Geo. 5. c. i	30 April 1912
An Act to empower the Central Argentine Railway Limited to redeem its seven per centum preference shares and to convert its consolidated seven per centum preference stock and for other purposes.
Collooney, Ballina and Balmullet Railways and Piers Act 1912	2 & 3 Geo. 5. c. ii	25 June 1912
An Act to extend the time for the completion of the railways authorised by the Collooney Ballina and Belmullet Railways and Piers Act 1907 (Note: Collooney, Ballina and Belmullet Railways and Piers Act 1907 (7 Edw. 7. c. cxxiv)) and for other purposes.
Weston-super-Mare Grand Pier Act 1912	2 & 3 Geo. 5. c. iii	25 June 1912
An Act to extend the time for the completion of the authorised pier and works of the Weston-super-Mare Grand Pier Company and for other purposes.
Wirral Railway (Extension of Time) Act 1912	2 & 3 Geo. 5. c. iv	25 June 1912
An Act to extend the period limited for the construction and completion of Railway No. 1 authorised by the Wirral Railway Act 1898 (Note: Wirral Railway Act 1898 (61 & 62 Vict. c. lxvii)) and to extend the time for the sale of surplus lands.
Credit Foncier of Mauritius Act 1912	2 & 3 Geo. 5. c. v	25 June 1912
An Act for the conversion of the preference stock of the Credit Foncier of Mauritius Limited the cancellation of paid up capital to repeal the Credit Foncier of Mauritius Limited Act 1895 (Note: Credit Foncier of Mauritius Limited Act 1895 (58 & 59 Vict. c. iii)) and for other purposes.
Leatherhead Gas Act 1912 (repealed)	2 & 3 Geo. 5. c. vi	25 June 1912
An Act to enable the Leatherhead Gas and Lighting Company to acquire the undertaking of the Cobham Gas Company and to confirm the agreement entered into with the latter company to authorise the raising of additional capital by and the conferring of further powers upon the Leatherhead Gas and Lighting Company and for other purposes. (Repealed by Wandsworth and District Gas Order 1936 (SR&O 1936/272))
Newry, Keady and Tynan Railway Act 1912	2 & 3 Geo. 5. c. vii	25 June 1912
An Act to extend the time for the compulsory purchase of lands for and for the completion of the Newry Keady and Tynan Railway and for other purposes.
Sidmouth Urban District Council Act 1912	2 & 3 Geo. 5. c. viii	25 June 1912
An Act to confer upon the Sidmouth Urban District Council powers in relation to the supply of gas and electricity and to enable the Council to acquire the undertaking of the Sidmouth Gas and Electricity Company.
Belfast Corporation Act 1912	2 & 3 Geo. 5. c. ix	25 June 1912
An Act to confer further powers upon the lord mayor aldermen and citizens of the city of Belfast with reference to their gas undertaking and for other purposes.
Everton, &c. Drainage Act 1912	2 & 3 Geo. 5. c. x	25 June 1912
An Act to repeal and re-enact with amendments an Act (Note: Everton, &c. Drainage Act 1860 (23 & 24 Vict. c. cliv)) relating to the embankment and drainage of certain low lands in the townships of Everton Scaftworth Gringley-on-the-Hill Misterton and Walkeringham in the county of Nottingham and to make further and better provision in respect thereof.
Penwortham Bridge Act 1912	2 & 3 Geo. 5. c. xi	25 June 1912
An Act to provide for the construction of a new bridge over the River Ribble from Preston to Penwortham in the county palatine of Lancaster and for other purposes.
Mersey Docks and Harbour Board Act 1912 (repealed)	2 & 3 Geo. 5. c. xii	25 June 1912
An Act to authorise the Mersey Docks and Harbour Board to borrow moneys in connection with the improvement of the port of Liverpool and the navigation of the River Mersey and for other purposes/ (Repealed by Mersey Docks and Harbour Act 1971 (c. lvii))
Liverpool Corporation Act 1912 (repealed)	2 & 3 Geo. 5. c. xiii	25 June 1912
An Act for regulating meetings and processions in streets within the city of Liverpool and for other purposes. (Repealed by Liverpool Corporation Act 1921 (11 & 12 Geo. 5. c. lxxiv))
Dunstable Gas and Water Act 1912	2 & 3 Geo. 5. c. xiv	25 June 1912
An Act to sanction and confirm the construction of certain existing works and to construct further works of water supply to raise additional capital for gas and water and for other purposes.
Church Stretton Urban District Water Act 1912	2 & 3 Geo. 5. c. xv	25 June 1912
An Act to authorise the urban district council of Church Stretton to purchase the undertaking of the Church Stretton Waterworks Company and to supply water and for other purposes in connexion therewith.
Egremont Urban District Water Act 1912	2 & 3 Geo. 5. c. xvi	25 June 1912
An Act to authorise the urban district council of Egremont to construct and maintain waterworks and supply water and for other purposes.
Ramsbottom Urban District Railless Traction Act 1912	2 & 3 Geo. 5. c. xvii	25 June 1912
An Act to enable the urban district council of Ramsbottom to construct overhead equipment and run trolley cars by railless traction and to confer other powers upon the Council.
Birkbeck Share and Debenture Trust Act 1912	2 & 3 Geo. 5. c. xviii	25 June 1912
An Act to provide for the incorporation under the Companies (Consolidation) Act 1908 (Note: Companies (Consolidation) Act 1908 (8 Edw. 7. c. 69)) of a Company to take over the investments securities property and assets of the Birkbeck Share and Debenture Trust and for other purposes.
Manchester Ship Canal Act 1912 (repealed)	2 & 3 Geo. 5. c. xix	25 June 1912
An Act to confer further powers upon the Manchester Ship Canal Company with respect to the holding and disposal of lands and for other purposes. (Repealed by Manchester Ship Canal Harbour Revision Order 2009 (SI 2009/2579))
Price's Patent Candle Company Act 1912	2 & 3 Geo. 5. c. xx	25 June 1912
An Act to confer further powers upon Price's Patent Candle Company Limited to enable the Company to change the name of the Company and for other purposes.
Aberdeen Market Company Order Confirmation Act 1912	2 & 3 Geo. 5. c. xxi	25 June 1912
An Act to confirm a Provisional Order under the Private Legislation Procedure (Scotland) Act 1899 (Note: Private Legislation Procedure (Scotland) Act 1899 (62 & 63 Vict. c. 47)) relating to the Aberdeen Market Company.
	Aberdeen Market Company Order 1912 Provisional Order to provide for the registration of the Aberdeen Market Company as a limited Company under the Companies (Consolidation) Act 1908 and to repeal the Act (Note: Aberdeen Market Act 1839 (2 & 3 Vict. c. lxiv)) relating to the Company from the date of such registration and for other purposes.	
Glasgow and South Western Railway Order Confirmation Act 1912	2 & 3 Geo. 5. c. xxii	25 June 1912
An Act to confirm a Provisional Order under the Private Legislation Procedure (Scotland) Act 1899 relating to the Glasgow and South Western Railway.
	Glasgow and South Western Railway Order 1912 Provisional Order to empower the Glasgow and South Western Railway Company to divert a road at Ayr and to acquire lands and for other purposes.	
Prestonpans Combination Water Supply (Finance) Order Confirmation Act 1912	2 & 3 Geo. 5. c. xxiii	25 June 1912
An Act to confirm a Provisional Order under the Private Legislation Procedure (Scotland) Act 1899 relating to Prestonpans Combination Water Supply (Finance).
	Prestonpans Combination Water Supply (Finance) Order 1912 Provisional Order to extend the period for the Repayment of Moneys borrowed by the County Council of the County of Haddington the Town Council of the Burgh of Prestonpans and the Town Council of the Burgh of Cockenzie and Port Seton for the purposes of the Prestonpans Combination Water Trust and for other purposes.	
Kilmarnock Gas Order Confirmation Act 1912	2 & 3 Geo. 5. c. xxiv	25 June 1912
An Act to confirm a Provisional Order under the Burgh Police (Scotland) Act 1892 (Note: Burgh Police (Scotland) Act 1892 (55 & 56 Vict. c. 55)) relating to Kilmarnock Gas.
	Kilmarnock Gas Order 1912 Kilmarnock Gas. Provisional Order.	
Clyde Lighthouses Order Confirmation Act 1912 (repealed)	2 & 3 Geo. 5. c. xxv	25 June 1912
An Act to confirm a Provisional Order under the Private Legislation Procedure (Scotland) Act 1899 relating to Clyde Lighthouses. (Repealed by Clyde Lighthouses Consolidation Order Confirmation Act 1940 (3 & 4 Geo. 6. c. xlii))
	Clyde Lighthouses Order 1912 Provisional Order to provide for the improvement of the River Clyde below Newark Castle Port Glasgow to amend the Acts relating to the Clyde Lighthouses and for other purposes.	
Dundee Harbour and Tay Ferries Order Confirmation Act 1912 (repealed)	2 & 3 Geo. 5. c. xxvi	25 June 1912
An Act to confirm a Provisional Order under the Private Legislation Procedure (Scotland) Act 1899 relating to Dundee Harbour and Tay Ferries. (Repealed by Dundee Harbour and Tay Ferries Order Confirmation Act 1952 (15 & 16 Geo. 6 & 1 Eliz. 2. c. xx))
	Dundee Harbour and Tay Ferries Order 1912 Provisional Order to sanction and confirm an agreement made between the Trustees of the Harbour of Dundee and the Caledonian Railway Company and the North British Railway Company for the working and user of the harbour rails of the Trustees to amend the provisions of the Dundee Harbour and Tay Ferries Consolidation Act 1911 (Note: Dundee Harbour and Tay Ferries Consolidation Act 1911 (1 & 2 Geo. 5. c. lxxx)) as to the qualification of persons who may elect and who may be elected Trustees and for other purposes.	
Falkirk and District Tramways Order Confirmation Act 1912	2 & 3 Geo. 5. c. xxvii	25 June 1912
An Act to confirm a Provisional Order under the Private Legislation Procedure (Scotland) Act 1899 relating to the Falkirk and District Tramways.
	Falkirk and District Tramways Order 1912 Provisional Order to revive the powers and extend the time for the construction of certain Tramways and Street Works authorised by the Falkirk and District Tramways (Extensions) Order 1906 to revive the powers and extend the time for the acquisition of Lands in connexion therewith and for other purposes.	
Allan Glen's School Order Confirmation Act 1912	2 & 3 Geo. 5. c. xxviii	25 June 1912
An Act to confirm a Provisional Order under the Private Legislation Procedure (Scotland) Act 1899 relating to Allan Glen's School.
	Allan Glen's School Order 1912 Provisional Order to authorise the Royal Technical College Glasgow to transfer Allan Glen's School Glasgow and the management thereof together with its endowment subject to certain deductions to the School Board of Glasgow to provide for the administration and management of the said School by the said School Board to amend the scheme of the said College and for other purposes.	
Metropolitan Police Provisional Order Confirmation Act 1912 (repealed)	2 & 3 Geo. 5. c. xxix	25 June 1912
An Act to confirm a Provisional Order made by one of His Majesty's Principal Secretaries of State under the Metropolitan Police Act 1886. (Note: Metropolitan Police Act 1886 (49 & 50 Vict. c. 22)) (Repealed by Statute Law (Repeals) Act 2008 (c. 12))
	Order made by the Secretary of State under the Metropolitan Police Act 1886.	
Brighton and Hove Gas Act 1912	2 & 3 Geo. 5. c. xxx	7 August 1912
An Act to empower the Brighton and Hove General Gas Company to establish a benefit fund for their servants and their dependents and for other purposes.
Ystradfellte Water Act 1912	2 & 3 Geo. 5. c. xxxi	7 August 1912
An Act to extend the time for the construction of the works authorised by the Ystradfellte Water Act 1902 (Note: Ystradfellte Water Act 1902 (2 Edw. 7. c. ccxxvii)) and to confer further powers upon the Neath Rural District Council in regard to their water undertaking and for other purposes.
Stockport Corporation Act 1912	2 & 3 Geo. 5. c. xxxii	7 August 1912
An Act to empower the mayor aldermen and burgesses of the county borough of Stockport to provide and work trolley vehicles and for other purposes.
Taff Vale Railway Act 1912	2 & 3 Geo. 5. c. xxxiii	7 August 1912
An Act to confer further powers upon the Taff Vale Railway Company with reference to the construction of works and the acquisition of lands and for other purposes.
Windermere District Gas and Water Act 1912	2 & 3 Geo. 5. c. xxxiv	7 August 1912
An Act to enable the Windermere District Gas and Water Company to raise additional capital to construct new waterworks and for other purposes.
Annfield Plain and District Gas Act 1912	2 & 3 Geo. 5. c. xxxv	7 August 1912
An Act for conferring further powers upon the Annfield Plain and District Gas Company.
Dublin and South Eastern Railway Act 1912	2 & 3 Geo. 5. c. xxxvi	7 August 1912
An Act to enable the Dublin and South Eastern Railway Company to make certain diversion railways in the county of Wicklow to apply their capital and funds and to confer further powers on them in relation to their general undertaking and for other purposes.
Great Eastern Railway Act 1912	2 & 3 Geo. 5. c. xxxvii	7 August 1912
An Act for conferring further powers upon the Great Eastern Railway Company for enabling the Great Northern and Great Eastern Joint Committee to acquire additional lands for extending the periods limited by former Acts for the completion of works for extending the time for the sale of superfluous lands held by the Company and by other companies and by certain joint committees for the electrification of the East London Railway and for other purposes.
Derwent Valley Water Act 1912	2 & 3 Geo. 5. c. xxxviii	7 August 1912
An Act to extend the time limited by the Derwent Valley Water Act 1909 (Note: Derwent Valley Water Act 1909 (9 Edw. 7. c. lxiii)) for the compulsory purchase of lands to make provisions as to compensation water gauges and for other purposes.
Cardiff Railway Act 1912	2 & 3 Geo. 5. c. xxxix	7 August 1912
An Act to extend the time limited by the Cardiff Railway Acts 1897 (Note: Cardiff Railway Act 1897 (60 & 61 Vict. c. ccvii)) 1898 (Note: Cardiff Railway Act 1898 (61 & 62 Vict. c. cclxii)) 1899 (Note: Cardiff Railway Act 1899 (62 & 63 Vict. c. lxi)) 1903 (Note: Cardiff Railway Act 1903 (3 Edw. 7. c. cxvii)) 1904 (Note: Cardiff Railway Act 1904 (4 Edw. 7. c. cxcv)) 1906 (Note: Cardiff Railway Act 1906 (6 Edw. 7. c. clvii)) 1908 (Note: Cardiff Railway Act 1908 (8 Edw. 7. c. xxxviii)) and 1910 (Note: Cardiff Railway Act 1910 (10 Edw. 7 & 1 Geo. 5. c. xlvi)) for the purchase of certain lands and for other purposes.
Southgate and District Gas Act 1912 (repealed)	2 & 3 Geo. 5. c. xl	7 August 1912
An Act to empower the Southgate and District Gas Company to establish a benefit fund for their servants and their dependents and for other purposes. (Repealed by Southgate and District Gas Order 1931 (SR&O 1931/753))
North Middlesex Gas Act 1912 (repealed)	2 & 3 Geo. 5. c. xli	7 August 1912
An Act to empower the North Middlesex Gas Company to establish a benefit fund for their servants and their dependents and for other purposes. (Repealed by North Middlesex Gas Order 1921 (SR&O 1921/1357))
City of London (Various Powers) Act 1912	2 & 3 Geo. 5. c. xlii	7 August 1912
An Act to authorise the construction of subways in the city of London to repeal the obligation to maintain Shadwell Fish Market to provide for the granting of superannuation and pension allowances to certain of the officers and servants of the Corporation of London and for other purposes.
Lea Bridge District Gas Act 1912	2 & 3 Geo. 5. c. xliii	7 August 1912
An Act to empower the Lea Bridge District Gas Company to establish a benefit fund for their servants and their dependents and for other purposes.
Maidenhead Gas Act 1912 (repealed)	2 & 3 Geo. 5. c. xliv	7 August 1912
An Act to empower the Maidenhead Gas Company to establish a benefit fund for their servants and their dependents and for other purposes. (Repealed by Uxbridge, Maidenhead, Wycombe and District Gas Order 1927 (SR&O 1927/313))
Tendring Hundred Water and Gas Act 1912	2 & 3 Geo. 5. c. xlv	7 August 1912
An Act to extend the limits of the Tendring Hundred Waterworks Company for and to confer further powers on the Company with reference to the supply of water and gas to authorise the Company to construct additional waterworks and for other purposes.
Brodsworth and District Gas Act 1912 (repealed)	2 & 3 Geo. 5. c. xlvi	7 August 1912
An Act to dissolve and reincorporate the Brodsworth and District Gas Company Limited and for other purposes. (Repealed by Royston and Brodsworth Gas Act 1931 (21 & 22 Geo. 5. c. liv))
Wandsworth, Wimbledon and Epsom District Gas Act 1912	2 & 3 Geo. 5. c. xlvii	7 August 1912
An Act for amalgamating the Wandsworth and Putney Gaslight and Coke Company the Mitcham and Wimbledon District Gaslight Company and the Epsom and Ewell Gas Company and for other purposes.
Australian Agricultural Company Act 1912	2 & 3 Geo. 5. c. xlviii	7 August 1912
An Act for granting additional powers to the Australian Agricultural Company for altering the capital of the Company for enabling the Company to make further alterations in its capital for consolidating and amending the Acts relating to the Company and for other purposes.
Stepney Borough Council (Spitalfields Market) Act 1912 (repealed)	2 & 3 Geo. 5. c. xlix	7 August 1912
An Act to amend the City of London (Spitalfields Market) Act 1902 (Note: City of London (Spitalfields Market) Act 1902 (2 Edw. 7. c. clxv)) and for other purposes. (Repealed by City of London (Various Powers) Act 1922 (12 & 13 Geo. 5. c. xxi))
Bedwellty Urban District Council Act 1912	2 & 3 Geo. 5. c. l	7 August 1912
An Act to authorise the urban district council of Bedwellty to supply gas and water within their urban district and the neighbourhood thereof to authorise the purchase of certain gas and water undertakings and to make further provision in regard to the local government and improvement of the district.
Belfast Water Act 1912	2 & 3 Geo. 5. c. li	7 August 1912
An Act to confer further powers on the Belfast City and District Water Commissioners.
Port of London Act 1912	2 & 3 Geo. 5. c. lii	7 August 1912
An Act to extend the time for completion of certain works to authorise the Port of London Authority to acquire compulsorily lands in the City of London and for other purposes.
Scunthorpe Urban District Water Act 1912	2 & 3 Geo. 5. c. liii	7 August 1912
An Act to authorise the Scunthorpe Urban District Council to construct new waterworks and to acquire additional lands to extend the limits for the supply of water by the Council to make further provision with respect to the water supply of the district and for other purposes.
Tavistock Urban District Council Act 1912	2 & 3 Geo. 5. c. liv	7 August 1912
An Act to authorise the Tavistock Urban District Council to acquire the water and market undertakings and other properties from the Duke of Bedford and to make further provision in regard to the water supplies and markets and fairs and the local government and improvement of the district and for other purposes.
North Ormesby, South Bank, Normanby and Grangetown Railless Traction Act 1912 (repealed)	2 & 3 Geo. 5. c. lv	7 August 1912
An Act for incorporating the North Ormesby South Bank Normanby and Grangetown Railless Traction Company and for other purposes. (Repealed by Teesside Corporation Act 1971 (c. xvii))
Shipley Urban District Council Act 1912 (repealed)	2 & 3 Geo. 5. c. lvi	7 August 1912
An Act to confer further powers on the urban district council of Shipley in regard to their water gas and electricity undertakings and to make further and better provision for the improvement and local government of the district and for other purposes. (Repealed by West Yorkshire Act 1980 (c. xiv))
Brighton Corporation Act 1912 (repealed)	2 & 3 Geo. 5. c. lvii	7 August 1912
An Act to empower the mayor aldermen and burgesses of the county borough of Brighton to provide and use trolley vehicles and for other purposes. (Repealed by Brighton Corporation Act 1931 (21 & 22 Geo. 5. c. cix))
Great Central Railway Act 1912	2 & 3 Geo. 5. c. lviii	7 August 1912
An Act to authorise the construction of a new railway and works and the acquisition of additional lands by the Great Central Railway Company to transfer the powers for the construction of certain railways from the Great Central Railway Company to the Hull and Barnsley and Great Central Railway Companies jointly and to authorise those companies to make a deviation railway to authorise the Great Northern and Great Central Railway Companies to make further works and acquire additional lands for their West Riding and Grimsby Railway to authorise the North Lindsey Light Railways Company to make further works to enable the Humber Commercial Railway and Dock Company to acquire the undertaking of the Barton and Immingham Light Railway Company and to raise further capital to confer further powers upon the Seaforth and Sefton Junction Railway Company and for other purposes.
Bawtry and District Gas Act 1912 (repealed)	2 & 3 Geo. 5. c. lix	7 August 1912
An Act for incorporating and conferring powers on the Bawtry and District Gas Company. (Repealed by South Yorkshire and Derbyshire Gas Act 1930 (20 & 21 Geo. 5. c. clxiii))
Hove Corporation Act 1912	2 & 3 Geo. 5. c. lx	7 August 1912
An Act to enable the mayor aldermen and burgesses of the borough of Hove to provide and run vehicles by means of railless traction and for other purposes.
Houghton-le-Spring District Gas Act 1912	2 & 3 Geo. 5. c. lxi	7 August 1912
An Act to confer powers upon the Houghton-le-Spring District Gas Company.
Bognor Gas Light and Coke Company (Electricity) Act 1912	2 & 3 Geo. 5. c. lxii	7 August 1912
An Act to empower the Bognor Gas Light and Coke Company to supply electricity to and within their statutory gas limits and for other purposes.
Fleetwood Gas Act 1912	2 & 3 Geo. 5. c. lxiii	7 August 1912
An Act for incorporating and conferring powers on the Fleetwood Gas Company.
Ivybridge Urban District Water Act 1912	2 & 3 Geo. 5. c. lxiv	7 August 1912
An Act to define and sanction the existing water undertaking of the urban district council of Ivybridge in the county of Devon to authorise the construction of new works and for other purposes.
Metropolitan District Railway Act 1912	2 & 3 Geo. 5. c. lxv	7 August 1912
An Act to make further provision respecting the undertaking of the Metropolitan District Railway Company to empower the London and South Western Railway Company to widen their Wimbledon and Fulham Railway to confirm an agreement between those companies with reference to that railway and for other purposes.
London and North Western Railway Act 1912	2 & 3 Geo. 5. c. lxvi	7 August 1912
An Act for conferring further powers upon the London and North Western Railway Company in relation to their own undertaking and upon that Company in conjunction with the Lancashire and Yorkshire Railway Company and the Great Western Railway Company respectively in relation to their joint undertakings and upon the Shropshire Union Railways and Canal Company in relation to their undertaking and for other purposes.
Christchurch Gas Act 1912	2 & 3 Geo. 5. c. lxvii	7 August 1912
An Act to extend the limits of supply of the Christchurch Gas Company and to confer further powers upon the Company.
Herne Bay Gas Act 1912	2 & 3 Geo. 5. c. lxviii	7 August 1912
An Act to confer further powers upon the Herne Bay Gas and Coke Company Limited and for other purposes.
Wakefield Gas Act 1912	2 & 3 Geo. 5. c. lxix	7 August 1912
An Act for conferring further powers upon the Wakefield Gaslight Company.
Swanage Gas and Water Act 1912	2 & 3 Geo. 5. c. lxx	7 August 1912
An Act to empower the Swanage Gas and Water Company to construct additional waterworks to confer further powers upon them with reference to their gas and water undertakings and for other purposes.
York Gas (Consolidation) Act 1912	2 & 3 Geo. 5. c. lxxi	7 August 1912
An Act to consolidate the York United Gas Light Company's special Acts to extend their limits of supply to authorise the Company to construct additional works and to raise additional capital to change the name of the Company and for other purposes.
Dover Corporation Act 1912	2 & 3 Geo. 5. c. lxxii	7 August 1912
An Act to empower the Corporation of Dover to acquire lands and property within the pier ward of the borough to construct new streets and street works to borrow money and for other purposes.
London United Tramways Act 1912	2 & 3 Geo. 5. c. lxxiii	7 August 1912
An Act to authorise the abandonment of certain existing and authorised tramways of the London United Tramways Limited in the borough of Richmond (Surrey) and to repeal and amend the provisions of the existing enactments relative thereto to authorise agreements between the London United Tramways Limited and the urban district council of Chiswick and for other purposes.
Gas Companies (Standard Burner) Act 1912 (repealed)	2 & 3 Geo. 5. c. lxxiv	7 August 1912
An Act to provide in the case of certain gas companies for the adoption of the Metropolitan Argand Burner No. 2 as a standard burner in substitution for the various burners now in use for the official testing of the illuminating power of gas supplied by them and for other purposes. (Repealed by Southend-on-Sea and District Gas Order 1928 (SR&O 1928/210))
Staffordshire Potteries Waterworks Act 1912	2 & 3 Geo. 5. c. lxxv	7 August 1912
An Act to enable the Staffordshire Potteries Waterworks Company to construct additional waterworks to sanction and confirm the construction of existing works to extend the limits of supply to raise additional capital and for other purposes.
Tees Conservancy Act 1912	2 & 3 Geo. 5. c. lxxvi	7 August 1912
An Act to authorise the Tees Conservancy Commissioners to make new roads for improving the access to lands reclaimed by them in the county of Durham to heighten the one-third tide river-training walls in the River Tees to confer further powers on the Commissioners for the regulation of the river and for other purposes.
Preston, Chorley and Horwich Tramways Act 1912	2 & 3 Geo. 5. c. lxxvii	7 August 1912
An Act to extend the periods now limited by the Preston Chorley and Horwich Tramways Acts 1903 (Note: Preston, Chorley and Horwich Tramways Act 1903 (3 Edw. 7. c. ccxxxv)) 1904 (Note: Preston, Chorley and Horwich Tramways Act 1904 (4 Edw. 7. c. lvi)) 1906 (Note: Preston, Chorley and Horwich Tramways Act 1906 (6 Edw. 7. c. xxxiv)) and 1909 (Note: Preston, Chorley and Horwich Tramways Act 1909 (9 Edw. 7. c. xxxiv)) for the compulsory purchase of lands and easements and for other purposes.
London Electric Railway Act 1912	2 & 3 Geo. 5. c. lxxviii	7 August 1912
An Act to empower the London Electric Railway Company to construct new Railways and for other purposes.
Llanelly Rural District Water Act 1912	2 & 3 Geo. 5. c. lxxix	7 August 1912
An Act to empower the Llanelly Rural District Council to obtain a supply of water from the River Sawdde in the county of Carmarthen to authorise the construction of works and for other purposes.
London Trust Company Act 1912	2 & 3 Geo. 5. c. lxxx	7 August 1912
An Act to convert the preferred stock of the London Trust Company Limited and to increase its paid-up capital to authorise the issue of further capital and for other purposes.
Midland Railway Act 1912	2 & 3 Geo. 5. c. lxxxi	7 August 1912
An Act to confer additional powers upon the Midland Railway Company for the construction of works and the acquisition of lands and for other purposes.
Birmingham Corporation Act 1912	2 & 3 Geo. 5. c. lxxxii	7 August 1912
An Act to empower the lord mayor aldermen and citizens of the city of Birmingham to construct tramways and street improvements and to make further provision in regard to their tramway gas and electricity undertakings and for other purposes.
Ashborne Urban District Council (Gas) Act 1912	2 & 3 Geo. 5. c. lxxxiii	7 August 1912
An Act to provide for the transfer of the undertaking of the Ashborne and District Gas Company to the Ashborne Urban District Council and to confer further powers on the said Council with respect to the supply of gas and for other purposes.
Barry Railway Act 1912	2 & 3 Geo. 5. c. lxxxiv	7 August 1912
An Act to enable the Barry Railway Company to construct a railway in the county of Glamorgan and for other purposes.
Edgware and Hampstead Railway Act 1912	2 & 3 Geo. 5. c. lxxxv	7 August 1912
An Act to authorise the deviation of part of the Edgware and Hampstead Railway to confer further powers on the Edgware and Hampstead Railway Company and for other purposes.
Great Western Railway Act 1912	2 & 3 Geo. 5. c. lxxxvi	7 August 1912
An Act for conferring further powers upon the Great Western Railway Company in respect of their own undertaking and upon that Company and the London and North Western Railway Company in respect of an undertaking in which they are jointly interested and upon the Great Western Railway Company and the Rhondda and Swansea Bay Railway Company in respect of junction railways and other works affecting their respective railways and for other purposes.
Great Northern Railway Act 1912	2 & 3 Geo. 5. c. lxxxvii	7 August 1912
An Act to authorise the Great Northern Railway Company to construct new railways and works and to acquire lands and for other purposes.
Rhymney Valley Sewerage Board Act 1912	2 & 3 Geo. 5. c. lxxxviii	7 August 1912
An Act to constitute and incorporate a Joint Board consisting of representatives of the urban district councils of Gelligaer Caerphilly Bedwellty Rhymney and Mynyddislwyn and the rural district council of St. Mellons in the counties of Glamorgan and Monmouth and to authorise the Board to construct main trunk sewers and other works for the disposal of the sewage of such districts and for other purposes.
Ericht Water and Electric Power Act 1912 or the Loch Ericht Water and Electricity Power Act 1912	2 & 3 Geo. 5. c. lxxxix	7 August 1912
An Act to incorporate and confer powers upon the Ericht Water and Electric Power Company to enable them to construct and maintain works and to acquire lands and for other purposes.
South Suburban Gas Act 1912 (repealed)	2 & 3 Geo. 5. c. xc	7 August 1912
An Act to authorise the acquisition by the South Suburban Gas Company of the undertakings of the Bromley and Crays Gas Company and the West Kent Gas Company to confer further powers on the South Suburban Gas Company and for other purposes. (Repealed by South Suburban Gas Act 1928 (18 & 19 Geo. 5. c. lxxx))
Woking District Gas Act 1912	2 & 3 Geo. 5. c. xci	7 August 1912
An Act for incorporating and conferring powers on the Woking District Gas Company.
Lanark County Tramways Act 1912	2 & 3 Geo. 5. c. xcii	7 August 1912
An Act to authorise the County Council of the county of Lanark to construct tramways in that county to confirm an agreement between the County Council and the Lanarkshire Tramways Company to authorise the County Council and the town councils of the burghs of Hamilton Motherwell and Wishaw to acquire the undertaking of the said Company and for other purposes.
Manchester Royal Exchange Act 1912	2 & 3 Geo. 5. c. xciii	7 August 1912
An Act to make provisions with regard to the constitution and regulation of the Manchester Royal Exchange Limited and the conversion of the ordinary stock of that Company and for other purposes.
Nottingham Mechanics Institution Act 1912	2 & 3 Geo. 5. c. xciv	7 August 1912
An Act to incorporate the Trustees of the Nottingham Mechanics Institution to extend the objects and powers of the institution and for other purposes.
Glasgow Boundaries Act 1912	2 & 3 Geo. 5. c. xcv	7 August 1912
An Act to extend the boundaries of the city and Royal burgh of Glasgow and of the county of the city of Glasgow and to alter and adjust the boundaries of the counties of Lanark Renfrew and Dumbarton and for other purposes.
Glasgow Water Act 1912	2 & 3 Geo. 5. c. xcvi	7 August 1912
An Act to authorise the Corporation of the City of Glasgow to construct new waterworks to acquire lands to borrow money for such works and for other purposes.
Fylde Water Board Act 1912	2 & 3 Geo. 5. c. xcvii	7 August 1912
An Act to empower the Fylde Water Board to construct additional waterworks to make better provision with regard to their water undertaking and for other purposes.
National Electric Construction Company Act 1912	2 & 3 Geo. 5. c. xcviii	7 August 1912
An Act for confirming certain agreements purporting to have been made under the Electric Lighting Act 1882 (Note: Electric Lighting Act 1882 (45 & 46 Vict. c. 56)) between the National Electric Construction Company Limited and their predecessors in title and certain local authorities and for other purposes.
Swansea Corporation Act 1912	2 & 3 Geo. 5. c. xcix	7 August 1912
An Act to confirm an agreement between the Swansea Improvements and Tramways Company and the mayor aldermen and burgesses of the borough of Swansea to authorise the said mayor aldermen and burgesses to construct tramways and street improvements to confer further powers upon them in regard to their tramways electricity water and market undertakings and to make further provision for the health local government and improvement of the borough and for other purposes.
Midland Railway (London, Tilbury and Southend Railway Purchase) Act 1912	2 & 3 Geo. 5. c. c	7 August 1912
An Act for vesting the undertaking of the London Tilbury and Southend Railway Company in the Midland Railway Company and for other purposes.
West Riding of Yorkshire Asylums Act 1912	2 & 3 Geo. 5. c. ci	7 August 1912
An Act to constitute a Lunatic Asylums Board for the west riding of the county of York to transfer certain existing county lunatic asylums to such Board and for other purposes.
Metropolitan Railway Act 1912	2 & 3 Geo. 5. c. cii	7 August 1912
An Act to confer further powers upon the Metropolitan Railway Company in relation to their own undertaking and to authorise that Company in conjunction with the Great Central Railway Company to construct railways and works to raise additional capital and for other purposes.
London County Council (Money) Act 1912 (repealed)	2 & 3 Geo. 5. c. ciii	7 August 1912
An Act to regulate the expenditure of money by the London County Council on capital account during the current financial period and the raising of money to meet such expenditure and for other purposes. (Repealed by London County Council (Finance Consolidation) Act 1912 (2 & 3 Geo. 5. c. cv))
London County Council (General Powers) Act 1912	2 & 3 Geo. 5. c. civ	7 August 1912
An Act to make provision with respect to the registration of petroleum oil depôts in the administrative county of London to confer further powers on the London County Council and for other purposes.
London County Council (Finance Consolidation) Act 1912 (repealed)	2 & 3 Geo. 5. c. cv	7 August 1912
An Act to consolidate the provisions of the Metropolitan Board of Works Loans Acts 1869 to 1871 and the London County Council (Money) Acts 1875 to 1912 with respect to the raising of money by the London County Council on capital account and other matters with such amendments as are necessary to make those provisions applicable to existing conditions. (Repealed by London County Council (Loans) Act 1955 (4 & 5 Eliz. 2. c. xxvi))
London County Council (Tramways and Improvements) Act 1912	2 & 3 Geo. 5. c. cvi	7 August 1912
An Act to empower the London County Council to construct and work new tramways to alter and reconstruct existing tramways and to make street improvements and other works and for other purposes.
Keighley Corporation Act 1912	2 & 3 Geo. 5. c. cvii	7 August 1912
An Act to empower the mayor aldermen and burgesses of the borough of Keighley to construct further waterworks and a street improvement to provide and work a trolley vehicle system to provide and work motor omnibuses on additional routes to extend the powers of the Corporation with regard to the health local government and improvement of the borough and for other purposes.
Bordon and District Gas Act 1912	2 & 3 Geo. 5. c. cviii	7 August 1912
An Act to incorporate and confer powers on the Bordon and District Gas Company and for other purposes.
Blyth Harbour Act 1912	2 & 3 Geo. 5. c. cix	7 August 1912
An Act to alter the constitution of and method of election to the Blyth Harbour Commission to confer further powers upon the Commissioners to authorise the Commissioners to construct works and acquire lands to raise additional money and to create stock and for other purposes.
Public Offices (Sites) Act 1912	2 & 3 Geo. 5. c. cx	7 August 1912
An Act to make provision for the acquisition of a Site for Public Offices in Westminster for the acquisition of land for the further extension of the Patent Office and for purposes in connection with the Record Office to amend the Public Offices Sites (Extension) Act 1908 (Note: Public Offices Sites (Extension) Act 1908 (8 Edw. 7. c. cxii)) and to make provision for certain other public purposes.
Local Government Board (Ireland) Provisional Orders Confirmation (No. 1) Act 1912	2 & 3 Geo. 5. c. cxi	7 August 1912
An Act to confirm certain Provisional Orders of the Local Government Board for Ireland relating to Dublin (two) Dungarvan the rural districts of Belfast Carlow and Larne and the Taghmaconnell Joint Burial Board.
	Dublin (Grattan Crescent) Order 1912 Provisional Order to enable the Corporation of Dublin to put in force the Compulsory Clauses of the Lands Clauses Acts.	
	Dublin (Philipsburgh Avenue) Order 1912 Provisional Order to enable the Corporation of Dublin to put in force the Compulsory Clauses of the Lands Clauses Acts.	
	Dungarvan Sewerage Order 1912 Provisional Order to enable the Council of the Urban District of Dungarvan to put in force the Compulsory Clauses of the Lands Clauses Acts.	
	Carnmoney Burial Ground Order 1912 Provisional Order to enable the Council of the Rural District of Belfast to put in force the Compulsory Clauses of the Lands Clauses Acts.	
	Bagenalstown Waterworks Order 1912 Provisional Order to. enable the Council of the Rural District of Carlow to put in force the Compulsory Clauses of the Lands Clauses Acts.	
	Carnlough Waterworks Order 1912 Provisional Order to enable the Council of the Rural District of Larne to put in force the Compulsory Clauses of the Lands Clauses Acts.	
	Taghmaconnell Joint Burial Board Order 1912 Provisional Order forming a united district under section 12 of the Public Health (Ireland) Act 1878. (Note: Public Health (Ireland) Act 1878 (41 & 42 Vict. c. 52))	
Local Government Board (Ireland) Provisional Orders Confirmation (No. 2) Act 1912	2 & 3 Geo. 5. c. cxii	7 August 1912
An Act to confirm certain Provisional Orders of the Local Government Board for Ireland relating to the urban districts of Monaghan and Blackrock the rural district of Newry (No. 1) and the Newry Port Sanitary Authority.
	Monaghan Order 1912 Provisional Order to enable the Council of the Urban District of Monaghan to put in force the Compulsory Clauses of the Lands Clauses Acts.	
	Blackrock Order 1912 Provisional Order to enable the Council of the Urban District of Blackrock to put in force the Compulsory Clauses of the Lands Clauses Acts.	
	Rathfriland Waterworks Order 1912 Provisional Order to enable the Council of the Rural District of Newry No. 1 to put in force the Compulsory Clauses of the Lands Clauses Acts.	
	Newry Port Sanitary Order 1912 Newry Port Sanitary Authority. Provisional Order.	
Local Government Board (Ireland) Provisional Orders Confirmation (No. 3) Act 1912	2 & 3 Geo. 5. c. cxiii	7 August 1912
An Act to confirm certain Provisional Orders of the Local Government Board for Ireland relating to the Dublin Joint Hospital District the Portarlington Joint Burial Board Clonmel and the King's County and County of Westmeath.
	Dublin Joint Hospital Order 1912 Provisional Order to enable the Dublin Joint Hospital Board to put in force the Compulsory Clauses of the Lands Clauses Acts.	
	Portarlington Joint Burial Board Order 1912 Provisional Order forming a united district under section 12 of the Public Health (Ireland) Act 1878.	
	Clonmel Order 1912 Provisional Order to alter and amend the Clonmel Corporation Act 1895 (Note: Clonmel Corporation Act 1895 (58 & 59 Vict. c. cxxxi)) and the Local Government Board (Ireland) Provisional Orders Confirmation (No. 3) Act 1897. (Note: Local Government Board (Ireland) Provisional Orders Confirmation (No. 3) Act 1897 (60 & 61 Vict. c. lxxxii))	
	Silver River Drainage Order 1912 Provisional Order to transfer the business of the Drainage Board for the Silver River Drainage District to the County Councils of the King's County and the County of Westmeath.	
Electric Lighting Orders Confirmation (No. 1) Act 1912	2 & 3 Geo. 5. c. cxiv	7 August 1912
An Act to confirm certain Provisional Orders made by the Board of Trade under the Electric Lighting Acts 1882 to 1909 relating to Ardsley Bingley Birstall (Amendment) Burnham Great Harwood Greetland Hoyland Nether Launceston and Wimborne and District (Amendment).
	Ardsley Electric Lighting Order 1912 Provisional Order granted by the Board of Trade under the Electric Lighting Acts 1882 to 1909 to the Electrical Distribution of Yorkshire Limited in respect of the Urban District of Ardsley in the West Riding of the County of York.	
	Bingley Urban District Council Electric Lighting Order 1912 Provisional Order granted by the Board of Trade under the Electric Lighting Acts 1882 to 1909 to the Bingley Urban District Council in respect of the Urban District of Bingley in the West Riding of the County of York.	
	Birstall Electric Lighting Order 1901 (Amendment) 1912 Provisional Order granted by the Board of Trade under the Electric Lighting Acts 1882 to 1909 for the amendment of the Birstall Electric Lighting Order 1901.	
	Burnham Electric Lighting Order 1912 Provisional Order granted by the Board of Trade under the Electric Lighting Acts 1882 to 1909 to the Burnham Urban District Council in respect of the Urban District of Burnham in the County of Somerset.	
	Great Harwood Electric Lighting Order 1912 Provisional Order granted by the Board of Trade under the Electric Lighting Acts 1882 to 1909 to the Urban District Council of Great Harwood in respect of the Urban District of Great Harwood in the County Palatine of Lancaster.	
	Greetland Electric Lighting Order 1912 Provisional Order granted by the Board of Trade under the Electric Lighting Acts 1882 to 1909 to the Urban District Council of Greetland in respect of the Urban District of Greetland in the West Riding of the County of York.	
	Hoyland Nether Electric Lighting Order 1912 Provisional Order granted by the Board of Trade under the Electric Lighting Acts 1882 to 1909 to the Urban District Council of Hoyland Nether in respect of the Urban District of Hoyland Nether in the West Riding of the County of York.	
	Launceston Electric Lighting Order 1912 Provisional Order granted by the Board of Trade under the Electric Lighting Acts 1882 to 1909 to the Launceston and District Electric Supply Company Limited in respect of the Borough of Dunheved otherwise Launceston in the County of Cornwall.	
	Wimborne and District Electric Lighting Order 1905 (Amendment) Order 1912 Provisional Order granted by the Board of Trade under the Electric Lighting Acts 1882 to 1909 to the Bournemouth and Poole Electricity Supply Company Limited for the Amendment of the Wimborne and District Electric Lighting Order 1905.	
Electric Lighting Orders Confirmation (No. 2) Act 1912	2 & 3 Geo. 5. c. cxv	7 August 1912
An Act to confirm certain Provisional Orders made by the Board of Trade under the Electric Lighting Acts 1882 to 1909 relating to Abercarn (Amendment) Aylesbury Biddulph Burnley (Extension) Darton and District Doncaster (Extension) Dorchester Ilkley Pontefract (Amendment) and Sherborne.
	Abercarn Electric Lighting (Amendment) Order 1912 Provisional Order granted by the Board of Trade under the Electric Lighting Acts 1882 to 1909 to the Urban District Council of Abercarn for the Amendment of the Abercarn Electric Lighting Order 1906.	
	Aylesbury Electric Lighting Order 1912 Provisional Order granted by the Board of Trade under the Electric Lighting Acts 1882 to 1909 to the Urban District Council of Aylesbury in respect of the Urban District of Aylesbury in the County of Buckingham.	
	Biddulph Electric Lighting Order 1912 Provisional Order granted by the Board of Trade under the Electric Lighting Acts 1882 to 1909 to the Biddulph Urban District Council in respect of the Urban District of Biddulph in the County of Stafford.	
	Burnley Electric Lighting (Extension) Order 1912 Provisional Order granted by the Board of Trade under the Electric Lighting Acts 1882 to 1909 to the Mayor Aldermen and Burgesses of the Boroügh of Burnley in respect of the Parish of Reedley Hallows in the Rural District of Burnley in the County of Lancaster.	
	Darton and District Electric Lighting Order 1912 Provisional Order granted by the Board of Trade under the Electric Lighting Acts 1882 to 1909 to the Electrical Distribution of Yorkshire Limited in respect of the Urban District of Darton and the Parish of Cawthorne in the Rural District of Penistone both in the West Riding of the County of York.	
	Doncaster Corporation Electric Lighting (Extension) Order 1912 Provisional Order granted by the Board of Trade under the Electric Lighting Acts 1882 to 1909 to the Mayor Aldermen and Burgesses of the Borough of Doncaster in respect of the Urban District of Wheatley in the West Riding of the County of York.	
	Dorchester Electric Lighting Order 1912 Provisional Order granted by the Board of Trade under the Electric Lighting Acts 1882 to. 1909 to Messrs. J. and W. Purves in respect of the Borough of Dorchester in the County of Dorset.	
	Ilkley Electric Lighting Order 1912 Provisional Order granted by the Board of Trade under the Electric Lighting Acts 1882 to 1909 to the Urban District Council of Ilkley in respect of the Urban District of Ilkley and the Parish or Township of Middleton in the Rural District of Wharfedale in the West Riding of the County of York.	
	Pontefract Electric Lighting Order 1912 Provisional Order granted by the Board of Trade under the Electric Lighting Acts 1882 to 1909 to the Mayor Aldermen and Burgesses of the Borough of Pontefract for the amendment of the Pontefract Corporation Electric Lighting Order 1907.	
	Sherborne Electric Lighting Order 1912 Provisional Order granted by the Board of Trade under the Electric Lighting Acts 1882 to 1909 to Messrs. J. and W. Purves in respect of the Urban District of Sherborne in the County of Dorset.	
Electric Lighting Orders Confirmation (No. 3) Act 1912	2 & 3 Geo. 5. c. cxvi	7 August 1912
An Act to confirm certain Provisional Orders made by the Board of Trade under the Electric Lighting Acts 1882 to 1909 relating to Abingdon Altrincham and Bowdon (Extension) Cheltenham (Extension) Goole and District Holmfirth Llanelly (Extension) Llantwit Fardre Rothwell and District Rushden and District and Wombwell and Worsborough.
	Abingdon Electric Lighting Order 1912 Provisional Order granted by the Board of Trade under the Electric Lighting Acts 1882 to 1909 to the Mayor Aldermen and Burgesses of the Borough of Abingdon in respect of the Borough of Abingdon in the County of Berks.	
	Altrincham and Bowdon Electric Lighting (Extension) Order 1912 Provisional Order granted by the Board of Trade under the Electric Lighting Acts 1882 to 1909 to the Altrincham Electric Supply Limited in respect of portions of the Urban District of Hale and of the Rural District of Bucklow in the County of Chester.	
	Cheltenham (Extension) Electric Lighting Order 1912 Provisional Order granted by the Board of Trade under the Electric Lighting Acts 1882 to 1909 to the Mayor Aldermen and Burgesses of the Borough of Cheltenham in respect of the Parishes of Prestbury and Leckhampton in the Rural District of Cheltenham in the County of Gloucester.	
	Goole and District Electric Lighting Order 1912 Provisional Order granted by the Board of Trade under the Electric Lighting Acts 1882 to 1909 to the Electrical Distribution of Yorkshire Limited in respect of the Urban District of Goole and the Townships or Parishes of Rawcliffe Airmyn and Hook in the Rural District of Goole all in the West Riding of the County of York.	
	Holmfirth Electric Lighting Order 1912 Provisional Order granted by the Board of Trade under the Electric Lighting Acts 1882 to 1909 to the Urban District Council of Holmfirth in respect of the Urban District of Holmfirth and the Urban District of Netherthong in the West Riding of the County of York.	
	Llanelly Electric Lighting (Extension) Order 1912 Provisional Order granted by the Board of Trade under the Electric Lighting Acts 1882 to 1909 to the Llanelly and District Electric Lighting and Traction Company Limited in respect of the Urban District of Burry Port and portions of the Parishes of Pembrey and Llanelly (Rural) in the Rural District of Llanelly all in the County of Carmarthen.	
	Llantwit Fardre Electric Lighting Order 1912 Provisional Order granted by the Board of Trade under the Electric Lighting Acts 1882 to 1909 to the South Wales Electrical Power Distribution Company in respect of the Parish of Llantwit Fardre and part of the Parish of Llantrisant both in the Rural District of Llantrisant and Llantwit Fardre in the County of Glamorgan.	
	Rothwell and District Electric Lighting Order 1912 Provisional Order granted by the Board of Trade under the Electric Lighting Acts 1882 to 1909 to the Electrical Distribution of Yorkshire Limited in respect of the Urban District of Rothwell and the Township of Oulton with Woodlesford in the Rural District of Hunslęt both in the West Riding of the County of York.	
	Rushden and District Electric Lighting Order 1912 Provisional Order granted by the Board of Trade under the Electric Lighting Acts 1882 to 1909 to Messrs. Francis Hugh Thornton Brook Sampson and John Clark in respect of the Urban District of Rushden the Borough of Higham Ferrers the Urban District of Irthlingborough and part of the Parish of Chelveston cum Caldecott in the Rural District of Thrapston all in the County of Northampton.	
	Wombwell and Worsborough Electric Lighting Order 1912 Provisional Order granted by the Board of Trade under the Electric Lighting Acts 1882 to 1909 to the Electrical Distribution of Yorkshire Limited in respect of the Urban Districts of Wombwell and Worsborough both in the West Riding of the County of York.	
Military Lands Provisional Order Confirmation Act 1912 (repealed)	2 & 3 Geo. 5. c. cxvii	7 August 1912
An Act to confirm a Provisional Order of the Secretary of State for War made in pursuance of section two of the Military Lands Act 1892 (Note: Military Lands Act 1892 (55 & 56 Vict. c. 43)) authorising the purchase by the Territorial Force Association of the West Riding of the County of York of land for the provision of rifle ranges and for other military purposes. (Repealed by Statute Law (Repeals) Act 2008 (c. 12))
	Deer Hill Rifle Ranges Order 1912 A Provisional Order made in pursuance of section two of the Military Lands Act 1892 authorising the purchase by the Territorial Force Association of the West Riding of the County of York of land for the provision of rifle ranges and for other military purposes.	
Bradford Corporation Trolley Vehicles Order Confirmation Act 1912 (repealed)	2 & 3 Geo. 5. c. cxviii	7 August 1912
An Act to confirm a Provisional Order made by the Board of Trade under the Bradford Corporation Act 1910 (Note: Bradford Corporation Act 1910 (10 Edw. 7 & 1 Geo. 5. c. cxvii)) relating to Bradford Corporation Trolley Vehicles. (Repealed by West Yorkshire Act 1980 (c. xiv))
	Bradford Corporation (Trolley Vehicles) Order 1912 Order authorising the Lord Mayor Aldermen and Citizens of the City of Bradford to provide maintain and use Trolley Vehicles upon Additional Routes in the said City.	
Education Board Provisional Orders Confirmation (Essex, &c.) Act 1912	2 & 3 Geo. 5. c. cxix	7 August 1912
An Act to confirm certain Provisional Orders made by the Board of Education under the Education Acts 1870 to 1911 to enable the Councils of the Administrative Counties of Essex and Surrey to put in force the Lands Clauses Acts.
	Essex County Council Order 1912 Provisional Order for putting in force the Lands Clauses Acts.	
	Surrey County Council (No. 2) Order 1912 Provisional Order (No. 2) for putting in force the Lands Clauses Acts.	
	Surrey County Council (No. 3) Order 1912 Provisional Order (No. 3) for putting in force the Lands Clauses Acts.	
Education Board Provisional Orders Confirmation (Kent, &c.) Act 1912	2 & 3 Geo. 5. c. cxx	7 August 1912
An Act to confirm certain Provisional Orders made by the Board of Education under the Education Acts 1870 to 1911 to enable the Councils of the Administrative Counties of Kent Montgomery Somerset Surrey and the West Riding of Yorkshire and the Urban District of Rhondda to put in force the Lands Clauses Acts.
	Kent County Council Order 1912 Provisional Order for putting in force the Lands Clauses Acts.	
	Montgomeryshire County Council Order 1912 Provisional Order for putting in force the Lands Clauses Acts.	
	Somerset County Council Order 1912 Provisional Order for putting in force the Lands Clauses Acts.	
	Surrey County Council (No. 1) Order 1912 Provisional Order (No. 1) for putting in force the Lands Clauses Acts.	
	Yorkshire West Riding County Council Order 1912 Provisional Order for putting in force the Lands Clauses Acts.	
	Rhondda Urban District Council Order 1912 Provisional Order for putting in force the Lands Clauses Acts.	
Education Board Provisional Orders Confirmation (London No. 1) Act 1912	2 & 3 Geo. 5. c. cxxi	7 August 1912
An Act to confirm certain Provisional Orders made by the Board of Education under the Education Acts 1870 to 1911 to enable the London County Council to put in force the Lands Clauses Acts.
	London County Council (No. 1) Order 1912 Provisional Order (No. 1) for putting in force the Lands Clauses Acts.	
Education Board Provisional Order Confirmation (London No. 2) Act 1912	2 & 3 Geo. 5. c. cxxii	7 August 1912
An Act to confirm a Provisional Order made by the Board of Education under the Education Acts 1870 to 1911 to enable the London County Council to put in force the Lands Clauses Acts.
	London County Council (No. 3) Order 1912 Provisional Order (No. 3) for putting in force the Lands Clauses Acts.	
Land Drainage (Lincoln West) (South District) Provisional Order Confirmation Act 1912 (repealed)	2 & 3 Geo. 5. c. cxxiii	7 August 1912
An Act to confirm a Provisional Order under the Land Drainage Act 1861 (Note: Land Drainage Act 1861 (24 & 25 Vict. c. 133)) in the matter of a proposed drainage district in the city of Lincoln and in the Parishes of Saxilby Skellingthorpe and Boultham in the county of Lincoln. (Repealed by Statute Law (Repeals) Act 1993 (c. 50))
	Land Drainage (Lincoln West) (South District) Provisional Order 1912 In the matter of a proposed Drainage District in the City of Lincoln and in the Parishes of Saxilby Skellingthorpe and Boultham in the County of Lincoln.	
Land Drainage (Billingham) Provisional Order Confirmation Act 1912 (repealed)	2 & 3 Geo. 5. c. cxxiv	7 August 1912
An Act to confirm a Provisional Order under the Land Drainage Act 1861 in the matter of a proposed drainage district in the parishes of Billingham Wolviston Grindon Norton and Stockton-on-Tees in the county of Durham. (Repealed by Statute Law (Repeals) Act 1993 (c. 50))
	Land Drainage (Billingham) Provisional Order 1912 In the matter of a proposed Drainage District in the Parishes of Billingham Wolviston Grindon Norton and Stockton-on-Tees in the County of Durham.	
Land Drainage (Pitsea) Provisional Order Confirmation Act 1912 (repealed)	2 & 3 Geo. 5. c. cxxv	7 August 1912
An Act to confirm a Provisional Order under the Land Drainage Act 1861 in the matter of a proposed drainage district in the parishes of Pitsea Bowers Gifford and South Benfleet in the county of Essex. (Repealed by Statute Law (Repeals) Act 1993 (c. 50))
	Land Drainage (Pitsea) Provisional Order 1912 In the matter of a proposed Drainage District in the Parishes of Pitsea Bowers Gifford and South Benfleet in the County of Essex.	
Gas and Water Orders Confirmation Act 1912	2 & 3 Geo. 5. c. cxxvi	7 August 1912
An Act to confirm certain Provisional Orders made by the Board of Trade under the Gas and Water Works Facilities Act 1870 (Note: Gas and Water Works Facilities Act 1870 (33 & 34 Vict. c. 70)) relating to Hatfield (Yorks) Gas Swansea Gas West Kent Gas and Eltham Valley Water.
	Hatfield (Yorkshire) Gas Order 1912 Order empowering the Hatfield (Yorks) Gas Light and Coke Company Limited to maintain and continue gasworks and to manufacture and supply gas within the parishes or townships of Hatfield and Stainforth in the west riding of the county of York.	
	Swansea Gas Order 1912 Order empowering the Swansea Gas Light Company to construct and maintain further works for the manufacture and storage of gas.	
	West Kent Gas Order 1912 Order empowering the West Kent Gas Company to construct and maintain further works for the manufacture and storage of gas.	
	Elham Valley Water Order 1912 Order authorising the Elham Valley Water Company Limited to raise additional capital.	
Local Government Board's Provisional Orders Confirmation (No. 1) Act 1912	2 & 3 Geo. 5. c. cxxvii	7 August 1912
An Act to confirm certain Provisional Orders of the Local Government Board relating to Buxton Cleethorpe with Thrunscoe Derby Leicester and Middleton.
	Buxton Order 1912 Provisional Order for altering the Buxton Gas Act 1870 (Note: Buxton Gas Act 1870 (33 & 34 Vict. c. lxviii)) and the Buxton Local Board Act 1873. (Note: Buxton Local Board Act 1873 (36 & 37 Vict. c. lvi))	
	Cleethorpe with Thrunscoe Order 1912 Provisional Order for altering the Cleethorpes Improvement Act 1902. (Note: Cleethorpes Improvement Act 1902 (2 Edw. 7. c. cliv))	
	Derby Order 1912 Provisional Order to enable the Urban Sanitary Authority for the Borough of Derby to put in force the Compulsory Clauses of the Lands Clauses Acts.	
	Leicester Order 1912 Provisional Order to enable the Urban Sanitary Authority for the Borough of Leicester to put in force the Compulsory Clauses of the Lands Clauses Acts.	
	Middleton Order 1912 Provisional Order for altering the Middleton Corporation Act 1910. (Note: Middleton Corporation Act 1910 (10 Edw. 7 & 1 Geo. 5. c. cxxx))	
Local Government Board's Provisional Orders Confirmation (No. 2) Act 1912	2 & 3 Geo. 5. c. cxxviii	7 August 1912
An Act to confirm certain Provisional Orders of the Local Government Board relating to Dawlish Gosforth Hyde Margate and Newport (Mon.).
	Dawlish Order 1912 Provisional Order to enable the Urban District Council of Dawlish to put in force the Compulsory Clauses of the Lands Clauses Acts.	
	Gosforth Order 1912 Provisional Order to enable the Urban District Council of Gosforth to put in force the Compulsory Clauses of the Lands Clauses Acts.	
	Hyde Order 1912 Provisional Order for partially repealing and altering the Hyde Local Board (Waterworks) Act 1870 (Note: Hyde Local Board (Waterworks) Act 1870 (33 & 34 Vict. c. xvii)) and the Hyde Corporation Act 1903. (Note: Hyde Corporation Act 1903 (3 Edw. 7. c. cxxiii))	
	Margate Order 1912 Provisional Order for partially repealing and altering the Margate Extension and Improvement Act 1877 (Note: Margate Extension and Improvement Act 1877 (40 & 41 Vict. c. ccvii)) the Margate Corporation Act 1900 (Note: Margate Corporation Act 1900 (63 & 64 Vict. c. ccl)) the Margate Corporation (Water) Act 1902 (Note: Margate Corporation (Water) Act 1902 (2 Edw. 7. c. ccxxxiv)) and the Margate Corporation Act 1908. (Note: Margate Corporation Act 1908 (8 Edw. 7. c. lxxxvii))	
	Newport (Mon.) Order 1912 Provisional Order to enable the Urban Sanitary Authority for the Borough of Newport (Monmouth) to put in force the Compulsory Clauses of the Lands Clauses Acts.	
Local Government Board's Provisional Orders Confirmation (No. 3) Act 1912	2 & 3 Geo. 5. c. cxxix	7 August 1912
An Act to confirm certain Provisional Orders of the Local Government Board relating to Cambridge Coalville Darlington Kington Prescot and Shifnal (Rural).
	Cambridge Order 1912 Provisional Order for altering the Cambridge Corporation Act 1850 (Note: Cambridge Corporation Act 1850 (13 & 14 Vict. c. xxxvii)) and the Cambridge University and Corporation Act 1894. (Note: Cambridge University and Corporation Act 1894 (57 & 58 Vict. c. lx))	
	Coalville Order 1912 Provisional Order for partially repealing and altering the Coalville Urban District Gas Act 1899. (Note: Coalville Urban District Gas Act 1899 (62 & 63 Vict. c. xxiii))	
	Darlington Order 1912 Provisional Order for altering the Darlington Extension and Improvement Act 1872 (Note: Darlington Extension and Improvement Act 1872 (35 & 36 Vict. c. cxii)) and the Local Government Board's Provisional Orders Confirmation (No. 9) Act 1902. (Note: Local Government Board's Provisional Orders Confirmation (No. 9) Act 1902 (2 Edw. 7. c. lxxxiii))	
	Kington Order 1912 Provisional Order for partially repealing and altering the Local Act 10 George IV. Cap. СІI. (Note: Kington (Herefordshire) Improvement Act 1829 (10 Geo. 4. c. cii))	
	Prescot Order 1912 Provisional Order to enable the Urban District Council of Prescot to put in force the Compulsory Clauses of the Lands Clauses Acts.	
	Shifnal Rural Order 1912 Provisional Order to enable the Rural District Council of Shifnal to put in force the Compulsory Clauses of the Lands Clauses Acts.	
Local Government Board's Provisional Orders Confirmation (No. 4) Act 1912	2 & 3 Geo. 5. c. cxxx	7 August 1912
An Act to confirm certain Provisional Orders of the Local Government Board relating to Bacup Huddersfield (two) and the Croydon and Wimbledon Joint Small Pox Hospital District.
	Bacup Order 1912 Provisional Order for altering the Bacup Corporation Water Act 1898 (Note: Bacup Corporation Water Act 1898 (61 & 62 Vict. c. clvi)) and the Bacup Corporation Act 1906. (Note: Bacup Corporation Act 1906 (6 Edw. 7. c. clxxi))	
	Huddersfield Order 1912 (No. 1) Provisional Order for altering the Huddersfield Improvement Act 1871 (Note: Huddersfield Improvement Act 1871 (34 & 35 Vict. c. cli)) the Huddersfield Waterworks and Improvement Act 1876 (Note: Huddersfield Waterworks and Improvement Act 1876 (39 & 40 Vict. c. c)) the Huddersfield Improvement Act 1880 (Note: Huddersfield Improvement Act 1880 (43 & 44 Vict. c. xcix)) and the Huddersfield Corporation Act 1906. (Note: Huddersfield Corporation Act 1906 (6 Edw. 7. c. lxxxiv))	
	Huddersfield Order 1912 (No. 2) Provisional Order to enable the Urban Sanitary Authority for the Borough of Huddersfield to put in force the Compulsory Clauses of the Lands Clauses Acts.	
	Croydon and Wimbledon Joint Smallpox Hospital Order 1912 Provisional Order for altering certain Confirming Acts.	
Local Government Board's Provisional Order Confirmation (No. 5) Act 1912 (repealed)	2 & 3 Geo. 5. c. cxxxi	7 August 1912
An Act to confirm a Provisional Order of the Local Government Board relating to Kidderminster. (Repealed by Statute Law (Repeals) Act 1998 (c. 43))
	Kidderminster (Extension) Order 1912 Provisional Order made in pursuance of Sections 54 and 59 of the Local Government Act 1888. (Note: Local Government Act 1888 (51 & 52 Vict. c. 41))	
Local Government Board's Provisional Orders Confirmation (No. 6) Act 1912	2 & 3 Geo. 5. c. cxxxii	7 August 1912
An Act to confirm certain Provisional Orders of the Local Government Board relating to Bethesda Darwen Dewsbury Llanelly and the Thurrock Grays and Tilbury Joint Sewerage District.
	Bethesda Order 1912 Provisional Order for altering the Bethesda Improvement Act 1854 (Note: Bethesda Improvement Act 1854 (17 & 18 Vict. c. cxi)) and certain Confirming Acts.	
	Darwen Order 1912 Provisional Order for partially repealing and altering the Darwen Corporation Act 1899. (Note: Darwen Corporation Act 1899 (62 & 63 Vict. c. ccxxiv))	
	Dewsbury Order 1912 Provisional Order for altering the Dewsbury and Batley Corporations (Gas) Act 1873 (Note: Dewsbury and Batley Corporations (Gas) Act 1873 (36 & 37 Vict. c. clix)) and the Dewsbury Improvement Act 1884. (Note: Dewsbury Improvement Act 1884 (47 & 48 Vict. c. clxxx))	
	Thurrock, Grays and Tilbury Joint Sewerage Order 1912 Provisional Order for partially repealing and altering the Llanelly Local Board Act 1888. (Note: Llanelly Local Board Act 1888 (51 & 52 Vict. c. clxxv))	
Local Government Board's Provisional Orders Confirmation (No. 7) Act 1912	2 & 3 Geo. 5. c. cxxxiii	7 August 1912
An Act to confirm certain Provisional Orders of the Local Government Board relating to Halifax and Queenborough.
	Halifax (Extension) Order 1912 Provisional Order made in pursuance of Sections 54 and 59 of the Local Government Act 1888.	
	Queenborough (Extension) Order 1912 Provisional Order made in pursuance of Sections 54 and of the Local Government Act 1888.	
Local Government Board's Provisional Orders Confirmation (No. 8) Act 1912	2 & 3 Geo. 5. c. cxxxiv	7 August 1912
An Act to confirm certain Provisional Orders of the Local Government Board relating to Caerphilly Llanrwst and Mansfield.
	Caerphilly Order 1912 Provisional Order to enable the Urban District Council of Caerphilly to put in force the Compulsory Clauses of the Lands Clauses Acts.	
	Llanrwst Order 1912 Provisional Order to enable the Urban District Council of Llanrwst to put in force the Compulsory Clauses of the Lands Clauses Acts.	
	Mansfield Order 1912 Provisional Order to enable the Urban District Council for the Borough of Mansfield to put in force the Compulsory Clauses of the Lands Clauses Acts.	
Local Government Board's Provisional Orders Confirmation (No. 9) Act 1912	2 & 3 Geo. 5. c. cxxxv	7 August 1912
An Act to confirm certain Provisional Orders of the Local Government Board relating to Liverpool Nantwich Newcastle-under-Lyme New Mills Stratford-upon-Avon and Torquay.
	Liverpool Order 1912 Provisional Order for altering the Local Act 59 George III. Cap. IX. (Note: Liverpool Markets and Tolls Act 1819 (59 Geo. 3. c. ix)) the Liverpool Building Act 1842 (Note: Liverpool Public Health and Buildings Act 1842 (5 & 6 Vict. c. xliv)) the Liverpool Improvement Act 1882 (Note: Liverpool Improvement Act 1882 (45 & 46 Vict. c. lv)) and the Local Government Board's Provisional Orders Confirmation (Askern &c.) Act 1881. (Note: Local Government Board's Provisional Orders Confirmation (Askern, &c.) Act 1881 (44 & 45 Vict. c. xcviii))	
	Nantwich Order 1912 Provisional Order for altering the Nantwich Urban District Council Act 1903. (Note: Nantwich Urban District Council Act 1903 (3 Edw. 7. c. civ))	
	Newcastle-under-Lyme Order 1912 Provisional Order for altering the Newcastle-under-Lymе Corporation Act 1877. (Note: Newcastle-under-Lyme Corporation Act 1877 (40 & 41 Vict. c. clxxii))	
	New Mills Order 1912 Provisional Order for altering the New Mills Urban District Council Act 1906. (Note: New Mills Urban District Council Act 1906 (6 Edw. 7. c. xxxv))	
	Stratford-upon-Avon Order 1912 Provisional Order for partially repealing and altering the Stratford-upon-Avon Borough Act 1879. (Note: Stratford-upon-Avon Borough Act 1879 (42 & 43 Vict. c. cxix))	
	Torquay Order 1912 Provisional Order for altering the Torquay Harbour and District Act 1886. (Note: Torquay Harbour and District Act 1886 (49 & 50 Vict. c. cxix))	
Local Government Board's Provisional Orders Confirmation (No. 10) Act 1912	2 & 3 Geo. 5. c. cxxxvi	7 August 1912
An Act to confirm certain Provisional Orders of the Local Government Board relating to Milford Haven Salford the Luddenden Foot Joint Sewerage District and the South West Gloucestershire United Districts.
	Milford Haven Order 1912 Provisional Order made in pursuance of Sections 54 and 59 of the Local Government Act 1888.	
	Salford Order 1912 Provisionäl Order for partially repealing and altering certain Local Acts and Confirming Acts.	
	Luddenden Foot Joint Sewerage Order 1912 Provisional Order for altering certain Confirming Acts.	
	South West Gloucestershire United Districts (Medical Officer of Health) Order 1912 Provisional Order for partially repealing a Confirming Act. (Note: Local Government Board's Provisional Orders Confirmation (No. 7) Act 1906 (6 Edw. 7. c. cvi))	
Local Government Board's Provisional Orders Confirmation (No. 11) Act 1912	2 & 3 Geo. 5. c. cxxxvii	7 August 1912
An Act to confirm certain Provisional Orders of the Local Government Board relating to Carlisle and Wallasey.
	Carlisle (Extension) Order 1912 Provisional Order made in pursuance of Sections 54 and 59 of the Local Government Act 1888.	
	County Borough of Wallasey Order 1912 Provisional Order made in pursuance of Sections 54 and 59 of the Local Government Act 1888.	
Local Government Board's Provisional Orders Confirmation (No. 12) Act 1912 (repealed)	2 & 3 Geo. 5. c. cxxxviii	7 August 1912
An Act to confirm certain Provisional Orders of the Local Government Board relating to Barnsley and Leeds. (Repealed by Statute Law (Repeals) Act 1989 (c. 43))
	County Borough of Barnsley Order 1912 Provisional Order made in pursuance of Sections 54 and 59 of the Local Government Act 1888 and for altering certain Confirming Acts.	
	Leeds (Extension) Order 1912 Provisional Order made in pursuance of Sections 54 and 59 of the Local Government Act 1888.	
Local Government Board's Provisional Order Confirmation (No. 14) Act 1912 (repealed)	2 & 3 Geo. 5. c. cxxxix	7 August 1912
An Act to confirm a Provisional Order of the Local Government Board relating to Dewsbury. (Repealed by West Yorkshire Act 1980 (c. xiv))
	County Borough of Dewsbury Order 1912 Provisional Order made in pursuance of Sections 54 and 59 of the Local Government Act 1888 and for altering certain Confirming Acts.	
Local Government Board's Provisional Orders Confirmation (Gas) Act 1912	2 & 3 Geo. 5. c. cxl	7 August 1912
An Act to confirm certain Provisional Orders of the Local Government Board relating to Bala Harrington and Hipperholme.
	Bala Gas Order 1912 Provisional Order under the Gas and Water Works Facilities Act 1870.	
	Harrington Gas Order 1912 Provisional Order under the Gas and Water Works Facilities Act 1870.	
	Hipperholme (Bailiff Bridge) Gas Order 1912 Provisional Order under the Gas and Water Works Facilities Act 1870.	
Sea Fisheries (Conway) Provisional Order Confirmation Act 1912	2 & 3 Geo. 5. c. cxli	7 August 1912
An Act to confirm a Provisional Order under the Sea Fisheries Act 1868 (Note: Sea Fisheries Act 1868 (31 & 32 Vict. c. 45)) relating to mussel fisheries in the estuary of the River Conway.
	Conway Mussel Fishery Order 1912 Order for the Improvement Maintenance and Regulation of a Mussel Fishery in the Estuary of the River Conway.	
Sea Fisheries (Lynn) Provisional Orders Confirmation Act 1912	2 & 3 Geo. 5. c. cxlii	7 August 1912
An Act to confirm two Provisional Orders under the Sea Fisheries Act 1868 relating to oyster and mussel fisheries in the estuary of the Wash in the county of Norfolk.
	Lynn Deeps Fishery Order 1912 Lynn Deeps Fishery Order 1912.	
	Lynn Several Fishery Order 1912 Lynn Several Fishery Order 1912.	
Exe Fisheries Provisional Order Confirmation Act 1912	2 & 3 Geo. 5. c. cxliii	7 August 1912
An Act to confirm a Provisional Order under the Salmon and Freshwater Fisheries Act 1907 (Note: Salmon and Freshwater Fisheries Act 1907 (7 Edw. 7. c. 15)) relating to the River Exe and other waters.
	Exe Fisheries Order 1912 Exe Fisheries Provisional Order 1912.	
Tramways Orders Confirmation Act 1912	2 & 3 Geo. 5. c. cxliv	7 August 1912
An Act to confirm certain Provisional Orders made by the Board of Trade under the Tramways Act 1870 (Note: Tramways Act 1870 (33 & 34 Vict. c. 78)) relating to Bingley Urban District Council Tramway Dewsbury Corporation Tramways Portsmouth Corporation Tramways and West Hartlepool Corporation Tramways.
	Bingley Urban District Council Tramway Order 1912 Order authorising the Urban District Council of the Urban District of Bingley to construct a Tramway in their District.	
	Dewsbury Corporation Tramways Order 1912 Order authorising the Mayor Aldermen and Burgesses of the Borough of Dewsbury to construct an additional Tramway in their Borough.	
	Portsmouth Corporation Tramways Order 1912 Order authorising the Mayor Aldermen and Burgesses of the Borough of Portsmouth to construct additional Tramways in the said Borough and for other purposes.	
	West Hartlepool Tramways Order 1912 Order authorising the Mayor Aldermen and Burgesses of the County Borough of West Hartlepool to construct Tramways in their Borough.	
Pier and Harbour Order Confirmation (No. 1) Act 1912	2 & 3 Geo. 5. c. cxlv	7 August 1912
An Act to confirm a Provisional Order made by the Board of Trade under the General Pier and Harbour Act 1861 (Note: General Pier and Harbour Act 1861 (24 & 25 Vict. c. 45)) relating to Tarbert (Lochfyne).
	Tarbert (Lochfyne) Harbour Order 1912 Provisional Order for incorporating Trustees for the Harbour of Tarbert (Lochfyne) in the County of Argyll and vesting the Harbour in them and for the Maintenance and Regulation of the Harbour.	
Pier and Harbour Orders Confirmation (No. 2) Act 1912	2 & 3 Geo. 5. c. cxlvi	7 August 1912
An Act to confirm certain Provisional Orders made by the Board of Trade under the General Pier and Harbour Act 1861 relating to Brixham Gillingham and Lowestoft.
	Brixham Harbour Order 1912 Order to authorise the Brixham Urban District Council to construct additional works to extend the harbour limits to amend the Acts and Orders relating to the harbour and for other purposes.	
	Gillingham Pier Order 1912 Order for authorising the construction and maintenance of a pier and other works at Gillingham in the County of Kent and for other purposes in connexion therewith.	
	Lowestoft (South) Pier Order 1912 Order for authorising certain widenings and improvements of the Lowestoft (South) Pier and for other purposes.	
Arbroath Corporation Gas Order Confirmation Act 1912	2 & 3 Geo. 5. c. cxlvii	7 August 1912
An Act to confirm a Provisional Order under the Private Legislation Procedure (Scotland) Act 1899 relating to Arbroath Corporation Gas.
	Arbroath Corporation Gas Order 1912 Provisional Order to authorise the Provost Magistrates and Councillors of the Burgh of Arbroath to raise further Money for their Gas undertaking and to confer on them further Powers in relation thereto and for other purposes.	
Dunbar Water Order Confirmation Act 1912 (repealed)	2 & 3 Geo. 5. c. cxlviii	7 August 1912
An Act to confirm a Provisional Order under the Private Legislation Procedure (Scotland) Act 1899 relating to Dunbar Water. (Repealed by East Lothian Water Order Confirmation Act 1938 (1 & 2 Geo. 6. c. xxiii))
	Dunbar Water Order 1912	
Glasgow Corporation Order Confirmation Act 1912	2 & 3 Geo. 5. c. cxlix	7 August 1912
An Act to confirm a Provisional Order under the Private Legislation Procedure (Scotland) Act 1899 relating to Glasgow Corporation.
	Glasgow Corporation Order 1912 Provisional Order to authorise the Corporation of the city of Glasgow to construct new tramways to extend the limits for the supply of gas to acquire lands to amend the Glasgow Police Acts to vary the incidence of the assessment for parks and for statute labour purposes to borrow money and for other purposes.	
Clyde Valley Electrical Power Order Confirmation Act 1912 (repealed)	2 & 3 Geo. 5. c. cl	7 August 1912
An Act to confirm a Provisional Order under the Private Legislation Procedure (Scotland) Act 1899 relating to Clyde Valley Electrical Power Company. (Repealed by South of Scotland Electricity Order Confirmation Act 1956 (4 & 5 Eliz. 2. c. xciv))
	Clyde Valley Electrical Power Order 1912 Provisional Order to confer further powers on the Clyde Valley Electrical Power Company with reference to the capital of the Company to confirm an Agreement with the County Council of the County of Lanark and for other purposes.	
Kingston-upon-Hull Corporation Act Provisional Order Confirmation Act 1912	2 & 3 Geo. 5. c. cli	7 August 1912
An Act to confirm a Provisional Order made by one of His Majesty's Principal Secretaries of State under the Kingston-upon-Hull Corporation Act 1907. (Note: Kingston-upon-Hull Corporation Act 1907 (7 Edw. 7. c. cvi))
	Kingston-upon-Hull Corporation Order 1912 Provisional Order made by the Secretary of State under the Kingston-upon-Hull Corporation Act 1907.	
Gas Orders Confirmation (No. 1) Act 1912	2 & 3 Geo. 5. c. clii	13 December 1912
An Act to confirm certain Provisional Orders made by the Board of Trade under the Gas and Water Works Facilities Act 1870 relating to Conisbrough Gas Elham Valley Gas Knottingley Gas and Thurles Gas.
	Conisbrough Gas Order 1912 Order empowering the Conisbrough Gas Company Limited to raise additional capital and for other purposes.	
	Elham Valley Gas Order 1912 Order authorising the construction of gasworks for the manufacture of gas for the supply of the parishes of Elham Lyminge Postling and Stanford in the county of Kent.	
	Knottingley Gas Order 1912 Order authorising the Knottingley Gas Company to raise additional capital and for other purposes.	
	Thurles Gas Order 1912 Order empowering the Thurles Gas Company Limited to maintain and continue gasworks and to manufacture and supply gas within the urban district of Thurles and adjacent parishes in the county of Tipperary and for other purposes.	
Gas Orders Confirmation (No. 2) Act 1912	2 & 3 Geo. 5. c. cliii	13 December 1912
An Act to confirm certain Provisional Orders made by the Board of Trade under the Gas and Water Works Facilities Act 1870 relating to Cambridge University and Town Gas Cleethorpes Gas Tipperary Gas and Welwyn Knebworth and District Gas.
	Cambridge University and Town Gas Order 1912 Order extending the limits of supply of the Cambridge University and Town Gas Light Company making provision with respect to the disposal of stock and deposits held under the Company's co-partnership scheme and for other purposes.	
	Cleethorpes Gas Order 1912 Order empowering the Cleethorpes Gas Company to extend their limits of supply to raise Additional Capital and for other purposes.	
	Tipperary Gas Order 1912 Order empowering the Tipperary Gas Company Limited to maintain and continue gasworks and to manufacture and supply gas within the Urban District of Tipperary in the county of Tipperary and for other purposes.	
	Welwyn, Knebworth and District Gas Order 1912 Order empowering the Welwyn Knebworth and District Gas Company Limited to maintain continue and construct gasworks and to manufacture and supply gas within the Parishes of Aston Datchworth Watton-at-Stone Tewin Welwyn Digswell Ayot St. Peter Ayot St. Lawrence Codicote Knebworth and Shephall all in the County of Hertford and for other purposes.	
Falkirk Burgh Order Confirmation Act 1912	2 & 3 Geo. 5. c. cliv	13 December 1912
An Act to confirm a Provisional Order under the Private Legislation Procedure (Scotland) Act 1899 relating to Falkirk Burgh.
	Falkirk Burgh Order 1912 Provisional Order to provide for the costs of promoting the Falkirk Burgh Extension Draft Provisional Order 1911 and for other purposes.	
Electric Lighting Order Confirmation (No. 4) Act 1912 (repealed)	2 & 3 Geo. 5. c. clv	13 December 1912
An Act to confirm a Provisional Order made by the Board of Trade under the Electric Lighting Acts 1882 to 1909 relating to certain burghs and parishes in the counties of Linlithgow Stirling and Dunbarton. (Repealed by South of Scotland Electricity Order Confirmation Act 1956 (4 & 5 Eliz. 2. c. xciv))
	Linlithgow and Falkirk District Electric Lighting Order 1912 Provisional Order granted by the Board of Trade under the Electric Lighting Acts 1882 to 1909 to George Balfour in respect to certain burghs and parishes in the counties of Linlithgow Stirling and Dunbarton.	
Pier and Harbour Orders Confirmation (No. 3) Act 1912	2 & 3 Geo. 5. c. clvi	13 December 1912
An Act to confirm certain Provisional Orders made by the Board of Trade under the General Pier and Harbour Act 1861 relating to Annagassan Lossiemouth and Macduff.
	Annagassan Pier and Harbour Order 1912 Order for incorporating Commissioners for the Harbour of Annagassan in the County of Louth and for the Construction of a Pier and other Works and the Improvement Maintenance and Regulation of the Harbour.	
	Lossiemouth Old Harbour Order 1912 Order for the Incorporation of Harbour Commissioners and the construction maintenance and regulation of Works for a Boat Shelter at the Harbour of Lossiemouth in the Parishes of Drainie and Urquhart and County of Elgin.	
	Macduff Harbour Order 1912 Order for empowering the Provost Magistrates and Councillors of the Burgh of Macduff to construct New Works at and for the Maintenance and Regulation of the Harbour to alter the Dues Rates and Charges leviable thereat and for other purposes.	
Pier and Harbour Orders Confirmation (No. 4) Act 1912	2 & 3 Geo. 5. c. clvii	13 December 1912
An Act to confirm certain Provisional Orders made by the Board of Trade under the General Pier and Harbour Act 1861 relating to Hove Porthcawl Rhyl and Southend-on-Sea.
	Hove Pier Order 1912 Order authorising the construction maintenance and regulation of a Pier at Hove in the County of Sussex.	
	Porthcawl Pier Order 1912 Order for the construction maintenance and regulation of a Pier and Works at Porthcawl in the County of Glamorgan.	
	Rhyl Pier Order 1912 Order for the widening improvement and extension of the pier at Rhyl and other purposes in connexion therewith.	
	Southend-on-Sea Pier Order 1912 Order for authorising the construction of a Pier or Jetty at Southend-on-Sea in the County of Essex and the widening and improvement of the existing Southend Pier and for other purposes.	
Kent and Bela Fisheries Provisional Order Confirmation Act 1912	2 & 3 Geo. 5. c. clviii	13 December 1912
An Act to confirm a Provisional Order under the Salmon and Freshwater Fisheries Act 1907 relating to the Rivers Kent and Bela and other waters.
	Rivers Kent, Bela, Winster, Leven and Duddon Fisheries Provisional Order 1912 Kent Bela Winster Leven and Duddon Fisheries Provisional Order 1912.	
Provisional Order (Marriages) Confirmation Act 1912 (repealed)	2 & 3 Geo. 5. c. clix	13 December 1912
An Act to confirm a Provisional Order made by one of His Majesty's Principal Secretaries of State under the Provisional Order (Marriages) Act 1905. (Note: Provisional Order (Marriages) Act 1905 (5 Edw. 7. c. 23)) (Repealed by Statute Law (Repeals) Act 1977 (c. 18))
	St. Hilda Middlesbrough St. Matthew Marstow Holy Cross Whorlton St. Peter Ayot St. Peter and St. David Talybont Llanfihangel Geneu'r Glyn Order.	
North Killingholme (Admiralty Pier) Act 1912	2 & 3 Geo. 5. c. clx	13 December 1912
An Act to enable the Admiralty to construct and maintain a pier at North Killingholme on the River Humber and for purposes in connection therewith.
Local Government Board's Provisional Order Confirmation (No. 13) Act 1912	2 & 3 Geo. 5. c. clxi	13 December 1912
An Act to confirm a Provisional Order of the Local Government Board relating to the Eastern Valleys (Monmouthshire) Joint Sewerage District.
	Eastern Valleys (Monmouthshire) Joint Sewerage Order 1912 Provisional Order for forming a United District under Section 279 of the Public Health Act 1875.	
Local Government Board's Provisional Orders Confirmation (No. 15) Act 1912	2 & 3 Geo. 5. c. clxii	13 December 1912
An Act to confirm certain Provisional Orders of the Local Government Board relating to Bath Birmingham Burnley Bury Cambridge Christchurch Reading Sheffield and Southport.
	Bath (Extension) Financial Adjustments Order 1912 Provisional Order made in pursuance of Section 2 of the Local Government Board's Provisional Order (1910) Confirmation (No. 12) Act 1911. (Note: Local Government Board's Provisional Order (1910) Confirmation (No. 12) Act 1911 (1 & 2 Geo. 5. c. xxxv))	
	Birmingham (Extension) Financial Adjustments Order 1912 Provisional Order made in pursuance of Section 2 of the Local Government Board's Provisional Order (1910) Confirmation (No. 13) Act 1911. (Note: Local Government Board's Provisional Order (1910) Confirmation (No. 13) Act 1911 (1 & 2 Geo. 5. c. xxxvi))	
	Burnley (Extension) Financial Adjustments Order 1912 Provisional Order made in pursuance of Section 2 of the Local Government Board's Provisional Orders Confirmation (No. 5) Act 1911. (Note: Local Government Board's Provisional Orders Confirmation (No. 5) Act 1911 (1 & 2 Geo. 5. c. cxliv))	
	Bury (Extension) Financial Adjustments Order 1912 Provisional Order made in pursuance of Section 2 of the Local Government Board's Provisional Orders Confirmation (No. 5) Act 1911.	
	Cambridge (Extension) Financial Adjustments Order 1912 Provisional Order made in pursuance of Section 2 of the Local Government Board's Provisional Orders Confirmation (No. 10) Act 1911. (Note: Local Government Board's Provisional Orders Confirmation (No. 10) Act 1911 (1 & 2 Geo. 5. c. clxxxv))	
	Christchurch (Extension) Financial Adjustments Order 1912 Provisional Order made in pursuance of Section 2 of the Local Government Board's Provisional Orders Confirmation (No. 7) Act 1911. (Note: Local Government Board's Provisional Orders Confirmation (No. 7) Act 1911 (1 & 2 Geo. 5. c. clxxxiv))	
	Reading (Extension) Financial Adjustments Order 1912 Provisional Order made in pursuance of Section 2 of the Local Government Board's Provisional Order Confirmation (No. 11) Act 1911. (Note: Local Government Board's Provisional Order Confirmation (No. 11) Act 1911 (1 & 2 Geo. 5. c. cxlviii))	
	Sheffield (Extension) Financial Adjustments Order 1912 Provisional Order made in pursuance of Section 2 of the Local Government Board's Provisional Orders Confirmation (No. 7) Act 1911.	
	Southport (Extension) Financial Adjustments Order 1912 Provisional Order made in pursuance of Section 2 of the Local Government Board's Provisional Orders Confirmation (No. 10) Act 1911.	
Water Orders Confirmation Act 1912	2 & 3 Geo. 5. c. clxiii	13 December 1912
An Act to confirm certain Provisional Orders made by the Board of Trade under the Gas and Water Works Facilities Act 1870 relating to Chiddingfold and District Water East Surrey Water Henley-on-Thames Water and Wimborne Minster Water.
	Chiddingfold and District Water Order 1912 Order authorising the Chiddingfold and District Water Company Limited to maintain and continue and to construct waterworks and to supply water in the parishes of Dunsfold and Chiddingfold and part of the parish of Witley in the county of Surrey.	
	East Surrey Water Order 1912 Order extending the limits of supply of the East Surrey Water Company authorising the Company to raise additional capital and for other purposes.	
	Henley-on-Thames Water Order 1912 Order extending the limits of supply of the Henley-on-Thames Water Company Limited authorising the Company to construct new waterworks and to raise additional capital and for other purposes.	
	Wimborne Minster Water Order 1912 Order empowering the Wimborne Minster Waterworks Company Limited to raise further capital to extend the area of supply and for other purposes.	
Norfolk Fisheries Provisional Order Confirmation Act 1912	2 & 3 Geo. 5. c. clxiv	13 December 1912
An Act to confirm a Provisional Order under the Salmon and Freshwater Fisheries Act 1907 relating to certain waters in the counties of Norfolk and Suffolk.
	Norfolk Fisheries Provisional Order 1912 Norfolk Fisheries Provisional Order 1912.	
Great Central Railway (Grimsby Fish Dock) Act 1912 (repealed)	2 & 3 Geo. 5. c. clxv	13 December 1912
An Act to authorise the Great Central Railway Company to enlarge their fish dock at Grimsby and for other purposes. (Repealed by Cumbria Act 1982 (c. xv))
North Killingholme Pier Act 1912	2 & 3 Geo. 5. c. clxvi	13 December 1912
An Act to authorise the Yorkshire Transport Company Limited to construct a pier on the River Humber and for other purposes.
Sheffield Corporation Act 1912 (repealed)	2 & 3 Geo. 5. c. clxvii	14 February 1913 (Note: Although this act was passed in 1913, it was given a short title for 1912.)
An Act to authorise the Corporation of the city of Sheffield to execute certain street improvements and to construct additional tramways to confer on the Corporation further powers with respect to their tramway water and electrical undertakings and to make better provision for the health local government and finance of the city and for other purposes. (Repealed by Sheffield Corporation (Consolidation) Act 1918 (8 & 9 Geo. 5. c. lxi))
Land Drainage (Braithwaite Moss) Provisional Order Confirmation Act 1912 (repealed)	2 & 3 Geo. 5. c. clxviii	14 February 1913
An Act to confirm a Provisional Order under the Land Drainage Act 1861 in the matter of a proposed drainage district in the Parishes of Above Derwent Underskiddaw Embleton Wythop Setmurthy Isel Old Park and Bassenthwaite in the County of Cumberland. (Repealed by Statute Law (Repeals) Act 1993 (c. 50))
	In the matter of a proposed Drainage District in the Parishes of Above Derwent Underskiddaw Embleton Wythop Setmurthy Isel Old Park and Bassenthwaite in the County of Cumberland.	
Robinson's Trust Scheme Confirmation Act 1912	2 & 3 Geo. 5. c. clxx (Note: The Kirkcaldy District Water Order Confirmation Act 1913 (2 & 3 Geo. 5. c. clxix) was given a 1913 short title, and is therefore listed under that year.)	7 March 1913
An Act to confirm a Scheme of the Charity Commissioners for the application or management of the Charity of Samuel Robinson for Independent and Baptist Ministers.
	Scheme for the Application or Management of the Charity of Samuel Robinson for Independent and Baptist Ministers founded by Will proved on the fifth of October one thousand eight hundred and thirty-three.	
Beverley Charities Schemes Confirmation Act 1912	2 & 3 Geo. 5. c. clxxi	7 March 1913
An Act to confirm Schemes of the Charity Commissioners for the application or management of (1) Various Charities in the Borough of Beverley and the Parish of Beverley St. John in the East Riding of the County of York and (2) the Charity called or known as the Minster New Fund in the said Borough.
	Scheme for the application or management of the following Charities in the Borough of Beverley and the Parish of Beverley St. John in the East Riding of the County of York.	
	Scheme for the application or management of the Charity called or known as the Minster New Fund in the Borough of Beverley in the East Riding of the County of York comprised in Acts of 6 Geo. 3. (Note: St. John's Church, Beverley Estate Act 1766 (6 Geo. 3. c. 83 Pr.)) and 46 Geo. 3. (Note: St. John's Church, Beverley, Curates and Curates' Stipends Act 1806 (46 Geo. 3. c. cxl)) respectively and a Scheme of the Charity Commissioners of the 15th July 1870.	
Whitby Charities Scheme Confirmation Act 1912	2 & 3 Geo. 5. c. clxxii	7 March 1913
An Act to confirm a Scheme of the Charity Commissioners for the application or management of (1) Various Charities in the Ancient Parish of Whitby in the North Riding of the County of York and (2) the Charities of Alice Gallilee in Whitby and other places in the said North Riding.
	Scheme for the Application or Management of—: 1. The following Charities in the Ancient Parish of Whitby in the North Riding of the County of York.; 2. The Charities of Alice Gallill in Whitby and other places in the said North Riding founded by Deeds dated 1st November 1847 19th June 1852 and 20th October 1856 and comprised in a Scheme of the Charity Commissioners of the 17th February 1893.	
Haberdashers' Company Loan Fund Bearing Interest Scheme Confirmation Act 1912 (repealed)	2 & 3 Geo. 5. c. clxxiii	7 March 1913
An Act to confirm a Scheme of the Charity Commissioners for the application or management of the Charity called the Loan Fund Bearing Interest under the management of the Haberdashers' Company of the City of London. (Repealed by Statute Law (Repeals) Act 2013 (c. 2))
	Scheme for the application or management of the Charity called the Loan Fund Bearing Interest being under the management of the Haberdashers' Company of the City of London and consisting of the benefactions of John Hutchinson John Whyte Thomas Bowcher Richard Gourney William Bower Dame Mary Ramsay Mary Monox Giles Crowche Catherine Hall John Howes (otherwise Hewes) and Clement Kelke for Poor Householders.	

=== Private and personal acts ===
Short title	Citation	Royal assent
Long title
Howard Estate Act 1912	2 & 3 Geo. 5. c. 1 Pr.	13 December 1912
An Act to authorise the Trustees of the will of John Howard deceased to transfer to a company with limited liability to be hereafter formed the business of the testator and certain lands and premises held in connection therewith and for other purposes.
Bishop's Divorce Act 1912 (Note: This act was not printed by the King's Printer)	2 & 3 Geo. 5. c. 2 Pr.	7 August 1912
An Act to dissolve the marriage of Shenstone John Bishop of 20 Merrion Square in the city of Dublin surgeon-dentist with Ethel Mally Bishop his now wife and to enable him to marry again and for other purposes.

=== Sources ===
- 2 & 3 George V - 1912-13 – via HathiTrust.

== See also ==
- List of acts of the Parliament of the United Kingdom
