= Criminal Law Amendment Act 1912 =

Act of the Parliament of the United Kingdom

Criminal Law Amendment Act 1912 (Note: Section 9.)
- Act of Parliament
- Parliament of the United Kingdom
- Long title: An Act to amend the Criminal Law Amendment Act, 1885, the Vagrancy Act, 1898, and the Immoral Traffic (Scotland) Act, 1902.
- Citation: 2 & 3 Geo. 5. c. 20
- Territorial extent: United Kingdom

Dates
- Royal assent: 13 December 1912
- Commencement: 13 December 1912 (Note: The Acts of Parliament (Commencement) Act 1793.)
- Repealed: England and Wales: 1 January 1957; Scotland: 15 December 1976
Other legislation
Amends	Criminal Law Amendment Act 1885; Vagrancy Act 1898; Immoral Traffic (Scotland) Act 1902
Amended by	Criminal Justice Act 1948
Repealed by	England and Wales: Sexual Offences Act 1956; Scotland: Sexual Offences (Scotland) Act 1976
Relates to	Criminal Law Amendment Act 1885; Vagrancy Act 1898; Immoral Traffic (Scotland) Act 1902

Status: Repealed

Text of statute as originally enacted

The Criminal Law Amendment Act 1912 (2 & 3 Geo. 5. c. 20) was an act of the Parliament of the United Kingdom that extended provisions of the 1824 act to Scotland and Ireland and widened the scope of the original bill. The Amendment act is also known as the Criminal Law Amendment Act, 1912; and the Criminal Law Amendment Act, 1885.

== Provisions ==
The act introduced a number of new amendments including:

- Any male could now be whipped in private as a punishment. The court would decide on the instrument used and how many strokes would be administered.
- The 'person in charge' of brothels was now liable to charges, not just the 'occupier'.
- Arresting any man who would aid or abet a prostitute.

=== Application ===
The act would not apply to criminal proceedings triggered before the act came into effect.

== Subsequent developments ==
The whole act was repealed for England and Wales by section 51 of, and the fourth schedule to, the Sexual Offences Act 1956 (4 & 5 Eliz. 2. c. 69), which came into force on 1 January 1957.

The whole act was repealed for Scotland by section 21(2) of, and schedule 2 to, the Sexual Offences (Scotland) Act 1976, which came into force on 15 December 1976.
