= Criminal Law Amendment Act 1885 =

Act of the Parliament of the United Kingdom

Criminal Law Amendment Act 1885 (Note: Section 1.)
- Act of Parliament
- Parliament of the United Kingdom
- Long title: An Act to make further provision for the Protection of Women and Girls, the suppression of brothels, and other purposes.
- Citation: 48 & 49 Vict. c. 69
- Territorial extent: United Kingdom

Dates
- Royal assent: 14 August 1885
- Commencement: 14 August 1885 (Note: The Acts of Parliament (Commencement) Act 1793.)
- Repealed: England and Wales: 1 January 1957; Scotland: 15 December 1976
Other legislation
Amends	Offences against the Person Act 1861
Repeals/revokes	Offences against the Person Act 1875
Amended by	Prevention of Cruelty to Children Act 1901; Costs in Criminal Cases Act 1908; Children Act 1908; Criminal Law Amendment Act 1912; Administration of Justice (Miscellaneous Provisions) Act 1933; Criminal Justice Act 1948; Criminal Law Amendment Act 1951; Mental Health (Scotland) Act 1960
Repealed by	England and Wales: Sexual Offences Act 1956; Scotland: Sexual Offences (Scotland) Act 1976
Relates to	Criminal Law Amendment Act 1912

Status: Repealed

Text of statute as originally enacted

The Criminal Law Amendment Act 1885 (48 & 49 Vict. c. 69), or Stead's Act, was an act of the Parliament of the United Kingdom, the latest in a 25-year series of legislation in the United Kingdom beginning with the Offences against the Person Act 1861 (24 & 25 Vict. c. 100). The act had the long title "An Act to make further provision for the Protection of Women and Girls, the suppression of brothels, and other purposes". It raised the age of consent from 13 years of age to 16 years of age and delineated the penalties for sexual offences against women and minors. It also strengthened existing legislation against prostitution and homosexuality. This act was also notable for the circumstances of its passage in Parliament.

== Background ==
Under the Offences against the Person Act 1861 (24 & 25 Vict. c. 100), the age of consent was 12 (reflecting the common law), it was a felony to have unlawful carnal knowledge of a girl under the age of 10, and it was a misdemeanour to have unlawful carnal knowledge of a girl between the ages of 10 and 12. In addition, the 1861 act had made the penalty for indecent assault or attempted rape of a girl below the consensual age two years' imprisonment. Although the age of consent was subsequently raised to 13 upon amendments made to the 1861 act with the Offences Against the Person Act 1875 (38 & 39 Vict. c. 94), these pieces of legislation were enacted to protect mainly the very young and the very wealthy. The reason for the latter was that the lawmakers at that time were concerned about the welfare of heiresses, meaning their own daughters and, by extension, those of their friends and patrons; this is why they imposed the most severe penalties on those who would seduce or abduct women without their parents' consent even though the perpetrator intended to marry his quarry. Girls over the age of 13 and the poor had little protection under this law.

This double standard extended to prostitution. While it was tolerated in the middle-class, concern about the spread of venereal disease, specifically syphilis, persuaded Parliament to pass a series of Contagious Diseases Acts in an effort to contain the disease. The law permitted the police to arrest suspected prostitutes to be submitted for examination for venereal disease. Its unintended consequence was that any woman who happened to look like a prostitute would be subject to this law. Men, however, were not subjected even though they were equally responsible for spreading the disease. These acts were later repealed due to public pressure over the double-standard nature of these laws.

Public opinion at the time was thus in favour of stricter legislation and harsher penalties for sexual offenders, and better treatment for women and children. Social purity groups like the Society for the Suppression of Vice and feminists led by Josephine Butler focused on the evils of child prostitution as the chief factor in the sexual exploitation of the young. In addition, during the 1860s and 1870s, child advocacy groups were concerned with child abuse and other forms of maltreatment. Furthermore, groups like the Society for the Prevention of Cruelty to Children (SPCC) were concerned about the limitation of the testimony of young children. They investigated, reported and brought to court accusations of child abuse and neglect. It was in this socio-political climate that legislation to change this was introduced in 1881.

== Delay ==
The bill for the amendment of the law took four years to bring to completion. It began when Benjamin Scott, the anti-vice campaigner and Chamberlain of the City of London, approached Lord Granville to enact legislation for the protection of young girls from transportation to the Continent for "immoral purposes". In response, the House of Lords formed a select committee to investigate and confirmed an increase in child prostitution and white slavery. The committee's report made nine recommendations which became the basis for the Criminal Law Amendment Bill, including raising the age of consent to sixteen years as well as increased penalties for sexual offences.

The bill passed easily in the House of Lords in 1883, but was dropped in the House of Commons. It was reintroduced in 1884 but was again dropped during the struggle over parliamentary reform. In April 1885, the Earl of Dalhousie tempted fate by reintroducing the bill a third time. While the bill passed smoothly through the Lords in May—albeit with some revisions, most notably lowering the age of consent to fifteen—it again faced an uphill battle in the Commons, who were preparing to disband for the Whit Week bank holiday on 22 May 1885 and thus rather indifferent to the bill. In addition, many Members of Parliament were opposed to the measure, citing the curtailment of civil liberties through its increase of police powers.

Despite the effort of the Home Secretary, Sir William Harcourt, to move for a second reading of the Bill, no vote was taken on the measure by the time Parliament was adjourned on 22 May 1885. Supporters of the bill by that time feared that it would again be put aside and decided to take drastic action.

These fears apparently became real when Gladstone's government resigned over the budget. A minority caretaker government was formed under Lord Salisbury pending the holding of the general election later that year. As a result, it was deemed that no time-consuming or controversial measure be undertaken until then.

== Armstrong Case ==
Even before the government crisis in June 1885, on 23 May, W.T. Stead, the editor of the Pall Mall Gazette was approached by Benjamin Scott, who called his attention to its being set aside again. Stead, one of those who had been opposed to the Contagious Diseases Acts since the 1870s, was convinced to agitate popular support for protective legislation. His subsequent investigations were published in the Gazette from 6–10 July 1885 under the title "The Maiden Tribute of Modern Babylon". Not only did he base his investigations on interviews with the police, as well as those who were involved in the flesh trade, he went beyond it by setting an example: he "purchased" a girl and wrote about it.

With the assistance of Bramwell Booth of the Salvation Army and former prostitute Rebecca Jarrett, Stead bought 13-year-old Eliza Armstrong from her parents, who lived in the Lisson Grove area of west London, and went through the procedure of preparing her for export. She was examined to prove that she was still a virgin, then she was brought to a brothel and lightly drugged to wait for Stead, her purchaser. He entered Eliza's room and, having regarded this as confirmation that he had his way, withdrew to write his story. Eliza was turned over to the care of the Salvation Army.

The revelations caused an uproar. Copies of the Pall Mall Gazette were snapped up, often fetching premium prices. While many denounced Stead's exposé, it did what it was intended to do: it prompted Parliament to resume the debate over the Criminal Law Amendment Bill on 9 July 1885.

== Resumption of debate ==
The SPCC, which celebrated its first anniversary on 13 July 1885, took advantage of the resumption of the debate to make its own recommendations to the bill, including the raising of the age of consent to 18 years and more severe measures to protect children from exploitation. These proposals were introduced through their representatives in Parliament. However, many members of Parliament, already infuriated by Stead's tactics, sought to obstruct any alterations to the laws.

In addition to the recommendations made by the SPCC, on 31 July 1885 Liverpool MP Samuel Smith presented to the Commons a clause to abolish the oath for child victims for sexual assault. However, longtime opponents of the bill fought against it and, despite the best efforts of its supporters, the SPCC's proposal was narrowly defeated 123–120.

Outraged by this defeat, Stead condemned it in the Gazette, listing the names of each member who voted against the clause. Congregationalist minister Benjamin Waugh, the leader of the SPCC, focusing on the fact that the proposal was defeated by only three votes, redoubled his efforts to lobby support. Along the way he managed to bring Henry James, the former Attorney General, to his side and re-introduce Smith's amendment, which he did on 9 August. The Home Secretary, R.A. Cross, dropped his earlier opposition to the measure after consulting with a colleague as to the provisions of Scottish law on the subject. This was influential when the measure was once again put to a vote, and the SPCC's "oath clause" was included in the final version of the bill.

=== Section 11 ===
Even before the SPCC's "oath clause" was passed, another clause was introduced by MP Henry Labouchere late in the evening of 6 August 1885. Labouchere wanted to expand its reach. The clause provided for a term of imprisonment "not exceeding two years", with or without hard labour, for any man found guilty of gross indecency with another male, whether "in public or in private". No definition was given of what, exactly, constituted "gross indecency", as Victorian morality demurred from giving precise descriptions of activity considered immoral. In practice, "gross indecency" was widely interpreted as any male homosexual behaviour short of actual sodomy, which remained a more serious and separate crime.

== Passage and effects ==
The Criminal Law Amendment Act was finally passed on 14 August 1885 and in its final form effectively repealed sections 49 and 52 of the Offences against the Person Act 1861 (24 & 25 Vict. c. 100) and the whole of the Offences against the Person Act 1875 (38 & 39 Vict. c. 94). Its provisions were as follows:

- It raised the age of consent from 13 to 16 years of age;
- It made it a criminal offence to procure girls for prostitution by administering drugs, intimidation or fraud;
- It punished householders who would permit under-age sex on their premises;
- It made it a criminal offence to abduct a girl under 18 for purposes of carnal knowledge;
- It gave magistrates the power to issue search warrants to find missing females;
- It gave power to the court to remove a girl from her legal guardians if they condoned her seduction;
- It provided for summary proceedings to be taken against brothels; and
- It raised the age of felonious assaults to 13 and misdemeanor assault between 13 and 16 as well as imbecile women and girls.
- It criminalised "gross indecency between males" — previously the only homosexual crime was "buggery" (anal sex).

It also had sections outlining the penalties for abduction and procuring for the purpose of prostitution for girls under the age of eighteen, as well as relaxing the rules on witness testimony: while children under the age of 12 were allowed to testify as proposed by the SPCC, it also gave the right of the accused to testify on his own behalf.

The effect of the law became noticeable almost immediately. While few cases of sexual offences were reported before the passage of the law, the number of reported cases increased greatly in the months afterwards, especially child molestation cases. It may be that the actual number of cases remained the same, but the fact that more cases were reported and brought to the courts was at the very least a reflection of how the law changed perceptions of how women and children should be treated. While the inclusion of Section 11 criminalised male homosexuality, nevertheless it was connected with notions of male lust, which many felt was the root cause of vice. More than 80 years passed before decriminalisation took effect.

== Subsequent developments ==
The whole act was repealed for England and Wales by section 51 of, and the fourth schedule to, the Sexual Offences Act 1956 (4 & 5 Eliz. 2. c. 69), which came into force on 1 January 1957.

The whole act was repealed for Scotland by section 21(2) of, and schedule 2 to, the Sexual Offences (Scotland) Act 1976, which came into force on 15 December 1976.

Sections 3(3), 7 and 8 of this act were repealed for the Republic of Ireland by section 31 of, and the schedule to, the Non-Fatal Offences against the Person Act 1997, which came into force on 19 August 1997.

== Retroactive exoneration ==
Following the Royal Pardon of Alan Turing, who was convicted of gross indecency under this Act for homosexual acts with another man, the government announced in 2016 its intention to expand this retroactive exoneration to other men convicted of similar historical offences, through enacting what has been described as an "Alan Turing law".

The Policing and Crime Act 2017 serves as an amnesty law to pardon men who were cautioned or convicted under historical legislation that outlawed homosexual acts.

== See also ==
- Criminal Law Amendment Act
- William Thomas Stead
- The Salvation Army
- Catherine Booth
- William Booth
- Bramwell Booth
- Benjamin Scott
- Josephine Butler
- Rebecca Jarrett

== Bibliography ==
Hansard debates on the Criminal Law Amendment Bill 1885
House	First reading	Second reading	Committee	Report / Consideration	Third reading	Returned
Lords	Mar 26	Apr 13	Apr 28	Apr 30	May 1	Aug 7 Aug 10
Commons	N/A	May 22 Jul 9	Jul 30 Jul 31 Aug 3	Aug 6 Aug 7	Aug 7	N/A
