= Sexual Offences (Scotland) Act 1976 =

Act of the Parliament of the United Kingdom

Sexual Offences (Scotland) Act 1976 (Note: Section 22(1).)
- Act of Parliament
- Parliament of the United Kingdom
- Long title: An Act to consolidate certain enactments relating to sexual offences in Scotland.
- Citation: 1976 c. 67
- Territorial extent: Scotland (Note: Section 22(3).)

Dates
- Royal assent: 15 November 1976
- Commencement: 15 December 1976 (Note: Section 22(2).)
- Repealed: 1 April 1996 (Note: The Crime and Punishment (Scotland) Act 1997 (Commencement and Transitional Provisions) Order 1997 (SI 1997/1712).)

Other legislation
- Amends: See § Repealed enactments
- Repeals/revokes: See § Repealed enactments
- Amended by: Mental Health (Scotland) Act 1984
- Repealed by: Crime and Punishment (Scotland) Act 1997
- Relates to: Sexual Offences Act 1956; Criminal Law (Consolidation) (Scotland) Act 1995

Status: Repealed

Text of statute as originally enacted

Revised text of statute as amended

The Sexual Offences (Scotland) Act 1976 (c. 67) was an act of the Parliament of the United Kingdom that consolidated certain enactments relating to sexual offences in Scotland.

== Provisions ==
The act consolidated the principal statutory enactments relating to sexual offences in Scotland into a single statute. Sections 1 and 2 created offences of procuring a woman to have unlawful sexual intercourse, including by threats, false pretences or the administration of drugs. Sections 3 and 4 created offences of having unlawful sexual intercourse with a girl under 13 and with a girl between 13 and 16 respectively. Section 5 created an offence of indecent behaviour towards a girl between 12 and 16, and section 6 provided a defence to a charge of indecent assault. Section 7 consolidated the law on gross indecency between males. Sections 8 and 9 created offences of abduction of a girl under 18 with intent to have sexual intercourse and of unlawful detention with intent to have sexual intercourse.

Sections 10 to 14 dealt with offences relating to prostitution and brothels, including permitting a girl to use premises for intercourse (section 10), causing or encouraging seduction, prostitution or other conduct of a girl under 16 (section 11), trading in prostitution (section 12), proceedings against brothel keepers (section 13) and allowing a child to be in a brothel (section 14). Sections 15 to 19 contained miscellaneous procedural provisions, including power on indictment for rape to convict of other offences (section 15), competency of the accused and spouse as witnesses (section 16), arrest without warrant (section 17), power of search (section 18) and preservation of liability to other criminal proceedings (section 19).

=== Repealed enactments ===
Section 21(2) of the act repealed 10 enactments, listed in schedule 2 to the act.

Enactments repealed by section 21(2)
Citation	Short title	Extent of repeal
48 & 49 Vict. c. 69	Criminal Law Amendment Act 1885	The whole act.
2 Edw. 7. c. 11	Immoral Traffic (Scotland) Act 1902	The whole act.
2 & 3 Geo. 5. c. 20	Criminal Law Amendment Act 1912	The whole act.
12 & 13 Geo. 5. c. 56	Criminal Law Amendment Act 1922	The whole act.
18 & 19 Geo. 5. c. 42	Criminal Law Amendment Act 1928	The whole act.
19 & 20 Geo. 5. c. 36	Age of Marriage Act 1929	In section 1(1), the proviso.
1 Edw. 8 & 1 Geo. 6. c. 37	Children and Young Persons (Scotland) Act 1937	Sections 13 and 14.
4 & 5 Eliz. 2. c. 69	Sexual Offences Act 1956	Section 49.
1975 c. 20	District Courts (Scotland) Act 1975	In Schedule 1, paragraph 5.
1975 c. 21	Criminal Procedure (Scotland) Act 1975	In Schedule 1, in paragraph (c), the words "13, 14"
1975 c. 21	Criminal Procedure (Scotland) Act 1975	In Schedule 4, the entry relating to the Immoral Traffic (Scotland) Act 1902.

== Subsequent developments ==
The whole act was repealed by section 62(2) of, and schedule 3 to, the Crime and Punishment (Scotland) Act 1997, which came into force on 1 April 1996.
