= Immoral Traffic (Scotland) Act 1902 =

Act of the Parliament of the United Kingdom

Immoral Traffic (Scotland) Act 1902 (Note: Section 2(2).)
- Act of Parliament
- Parliament of the United Kingdom
- Long title: An Act to make further provision for the Punishment of Persons trading in Prostitution in Scotland.
- Citation: 2 Edw. 7. c. 11
- Territorial extent: Scotland (Note: Section 2(1).)

Dates
- Royal assent: 22 July 1902
- Commencement: 22 July 1902 (Note: The Acts of Parliament (Commencement) Act 1793.)
- Repealed: 15 December 1976
Other legislation
Amended by	Criminal Law Amendment Act 1912
Repealed by	Sexual Offences (Scotland) Act 1976

Status: Repealed

Text of statute as originally enacted

The Immoral Traffic (Scotland) Act 1902 (2 Edw. 7. c. 11) was an act of the Parliament of the United Kingdom, given royal assent on 22 July 1902 and repealed in 1976.

The act, which extended only to Scotland, provided that any man who "knowingly lives wholly or in part" on income gained through prostitution, or any man who "solicits or importunes for immoral purposes" in a public place were guilty of a criminal offence, punishable by up to three months imprisonment with hard labour by a court of summary conviction.

It further provided that if evidence was given to a court that there is reason to believe a house was used for the purposes of prostitution, and that a man on the premises was living on the earnings of that activity, a court could issue a warrant for the house to be entered and searched, and the man arrested. If a man was proved to live with (or habitually keep company with) a prostitute, and have no visible means of support, he could be deemed to be living off the earnings of prostitution unless proven otherwise.

== Subsequent developments ==
The whole act was repealed by section 21(2) of, and schedule 2 to, the Sexual Offences (Scotland) Act 1976, which came into force on 15 December 1976.
