= Timeline of LGBTQ history in the United Kingdom =

Pink Union Jack pride flag

This is a timeline of notable events in the history of the lesbian, gay, bisexual, transgender, and queer (LGBTQ) community in the United Kingdom from the time of its initial formation in 1707.

== Background ==
As the Roman Empire began to accept Christianity and with the formal arrival of Augustine of Canterbury in Britain in 597, sodomy became prohibited. Welsh King Maelgwn (Malgo) of Gwynedd was described by Geoffrey of Monmouth as “very much to the detestable vice of sodomy, by which he made himself abominable to God”. In the seventh century, a specific mention of homosexual sex appears in Anglo-Saxon law.

Alcuin of York (735-804), an abbot, wrote love poems to other monks in spite of numerous church laws. Historians agree that he came "perilously close to communicating openly his same-sex desires".

Historian John Boswell finds evidence of "what might be called a gay subculture" between 1050 and 1150 which completely disappears by 1300. For example, William of Malmesbury, the foremost English historian of the 12th century, describes William II of England as "being in lust with Ranulf Flambard" and describes court as being full of "sodomites".

The 1102 Council of London (Roman Catholic church council of the church in England) made clear that sodomy should be confessed as a sin.

Fleta, published in 1290, suggested being buried alive as a punishment for 'sodomites' - whilst the 'Britton' advocated burning - though no evidence exists that the punishments were ever carried out.

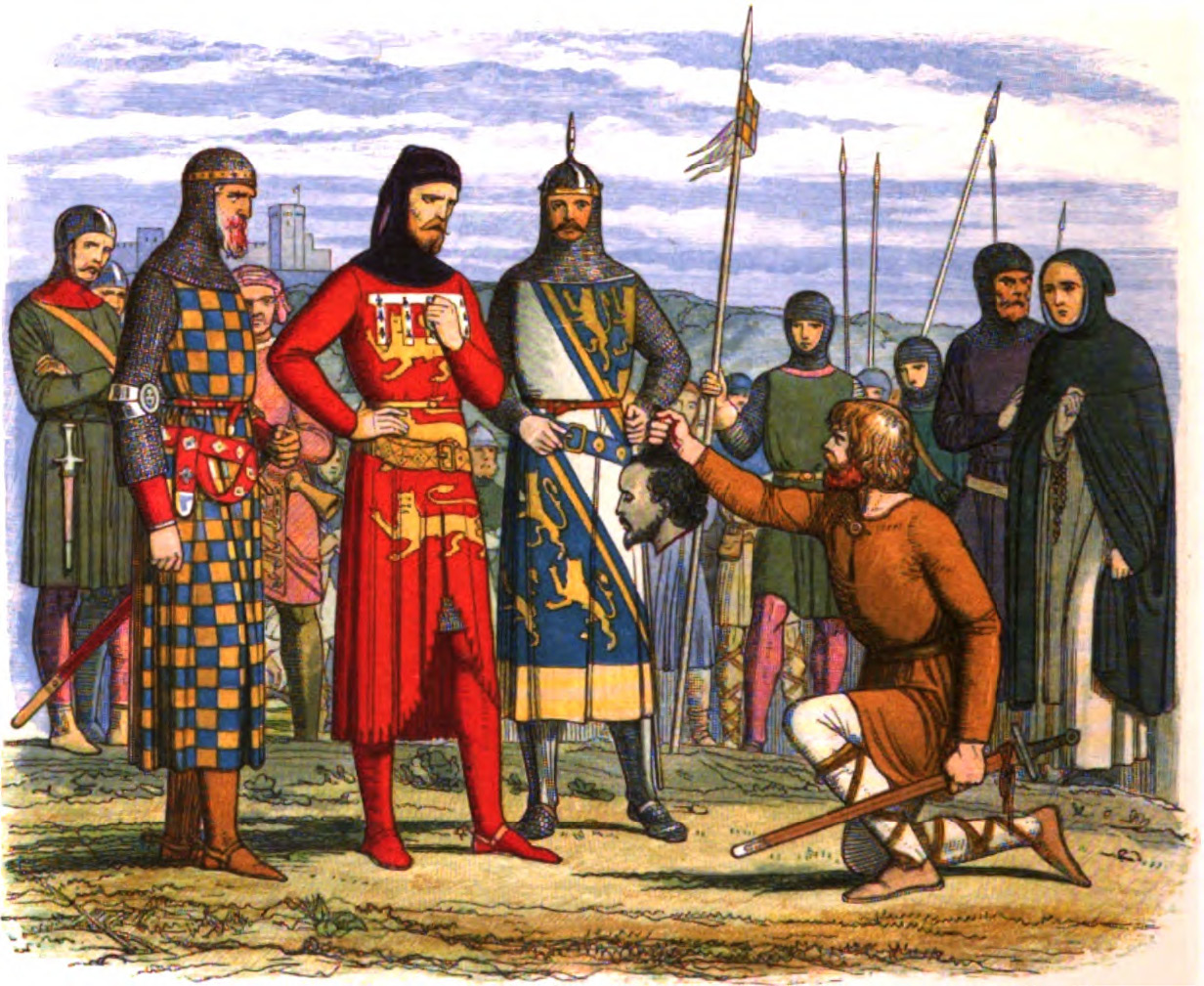
The head of Piers Gaveston, 1st Earl of Cornwall, is delivered to Thomas, 2nd Earl of Lancaster; Humphrey de Bohun, 4th Earl of Hereford; and Edmund FitzAlan, 9th Earl of Arundel, for inspection.

Edward II of England (1307–1337) met his lover Piers Gaveston, 1st Earl of Cornwall, when both were 16 years old and, after his execution, formed a close relationship with Hugh Despenser who was later tried, convicted and sentenced to death, being hanged, drawn and quartered.

John Rykener, known also as Johannes Richer and Eleanor, a transvestite prostitute working mainly in London. was arrested in 1395 for cross-dressing.

King Henry VIII of England passed the Buggery Act 1533 making intercourse per anum by a man with a man or woman, or intercourse per anum or per vaginum by either a man or a woman with an animal, punishable by death. Sir Walter Hungerford was the first man to be executed under the Act, in 1540. The Buggery Act was re-enacted three times and then, in 1541, enacted to continue in force "for ever". In 1543, Henry VIII gives royal assent to the Laws in Wales Act 1542, extending the buggery law into Wales. In 1547, Edward VI's first Parliament repeals all felonies created in the last reign of King Henry VIII. The provisions of the Buggery Act 1533 are given new force the following year, with minor amendments. The penalty for buggery remained death, but goods and lands were not forfeit, and the rights of wives and heirs were safeguarded.Mary I repealed the Buggery Act during her brief reign of 1553–1558 but Elizabeth I reinstated the sodomy laws of 1533 on ascending to the English throne, which were then given permanent force until replaced with the Offences Against the Person Act 1828.

Meanwhile in Scotland, the first recorded execution for sodomy in Scotland takes place in 1570 when John Litster and John Swan are strangled and burnt at the stake. Their crime was recorded at the time as the ‘wild, filthie, execrabill, detestable and unnatural sin of sodomy’.

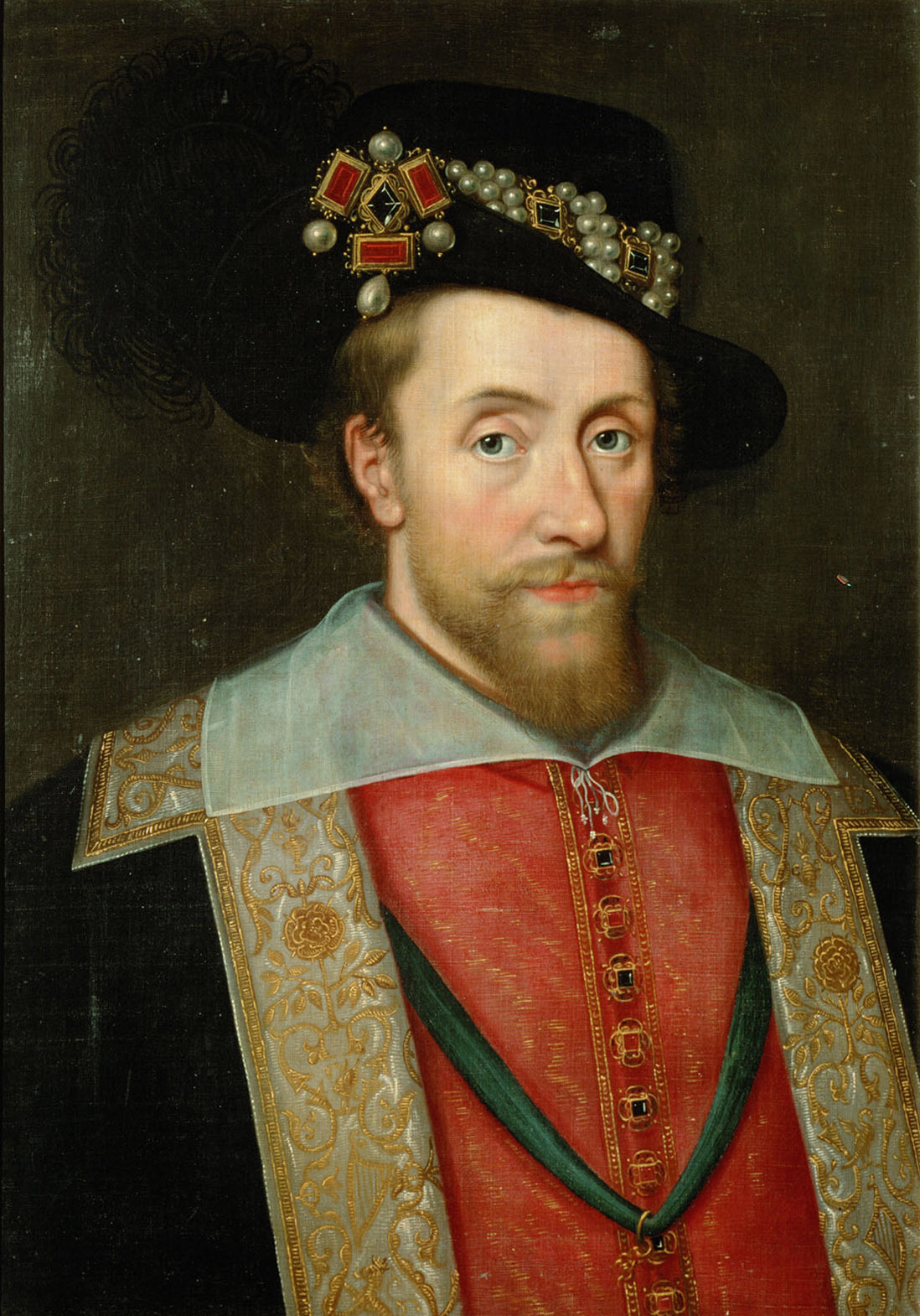
King James I of England, VI of Scotland

King James VI of Scotland, future King James I England had romantic relationships with three men: Esmé Stewart, Robert Carr and George Villiers, 1st Duke of Buckingham. In 1580 at 14 years old, King James VI of Scotland began a relationship with Franco-Scottish Lord Esmé Stewart, 1st Duke of Lennox, a relative 24 years his senior. The influence Lennox his "favourite" had on politics, and the resentment at the wealth they acquired, became major political issues during his reign until Scottish nobles forced the King to banish him to France, where he died in 1583..

In 1634, the Buggery Act 1533 was extended to Ireland. In 1663, London diarist Samuel Pepys writes that ‘Sir Jemmes and Mr Batten both say that buggery is now almost grown as common among our gallants as in Italy.’

A same-sex marriage is annulled in 1682: Arabella Hunt had married "James Howard" two years earlier but the marriage was annulled on the ground that Howard was in fact Amy Poulter, a 'perfect woman in all her parts', and two women could not validly marry.

King William III of England had several close, male associates, including two Dutch courtiers to whom he granted English titles: Hans Willem Bentinck became Earl of Portland and Arnold Joost van Keppel was created Earl of Albemarle. These relationships with male friends and his apparent lack of more than one female mistress led William's enemies to suggest that he might prefer homosexual relationships. Keppel was 20 years William's junior, described as strikingly handsome, and rose from being a royal page to an earldom with some ease. In 1697, William Bentinck, 1st Earl of Portland wrote to King William III that "the kindness which your Majesty has for a young man, and the way in which you seem to authorise his liberties ... make the world say things I am ashamed to hear". William dismissed these suggestions, saying, "It seems to me very extraordinary that it should be impossible to have esteem and regard for a young man without it being criminal."

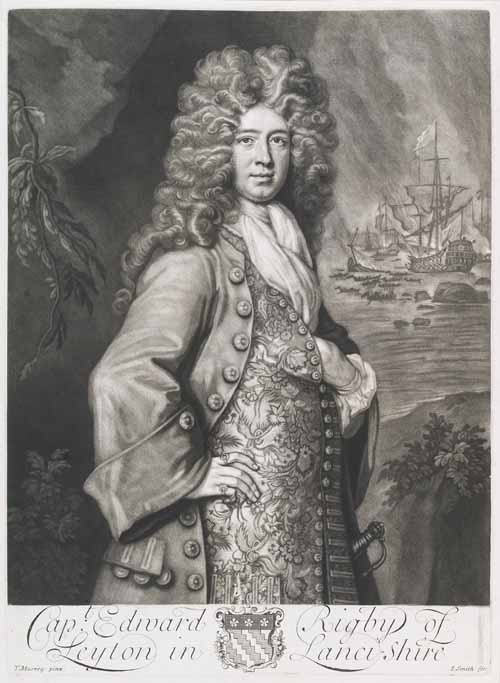
Captain Edward Rigby

Agent provocateurs from the Society for the Reformation of Manners were sometimes used to entrap men, such as naval Captain Edward Rigby. He was arrested in 1698 having unknowingly approached and arranged to meet an agent of the society, William Minton, where constables then listened to his propositions and he was convicted for "sodomitical intent".

== 18th century from 1707 ==
- 1707 - At the time of union between England and Scotland in 1707 which formed the united Kingdom of Great Britain, buggery in England and Wales (due to the 1533 Buggery Act) and sodomy in Scotland, were punishable by death.
- 1711 – Anne, Queen of Great Britain ended a long-lasting intimate friendship with Sarah Churchill, Duchess of Marlborough. The "Queen's Favourite" hoped to wield power equal to that of a government minister. When their relationship soured, she blackmailed Anne with letters revealing their intimacy, and accused her of perverting the course of national affairs by keeping lesbian favourites. Anne and Sarah had invented petnames for themselves during their youths which they continued to use after Anne became queen: Mrs Freeman (Sarah) and Mrs Morley (Anne). Effectively a business manager, Sarah had control over the queen's position, from her finances to people admitted to the royal presence.
- 1722 – John Quincy writes about lesbianism in his second edition of the Lexicon Physico Medicum. According to Quincy, confricatrices or confictrices were terms used by authors for lesbians "who have learned to titulate one another with their clitoris, in imitation of venereal intercourse with men".
- 1724 – Margaret Clap, better known as Mother Clap, ran a coffee house from 1724 to 1726 in Holborn, London. The coffee house was popular as a Molly House for the underground gay community., She cared for her customers, and catered especially to the gay men who frequented it. She was known to have provided "beds in every room of the house" and commonly had "thirty or forty of such Kind of Chaps every Night, but more especially on Sunday Nights".
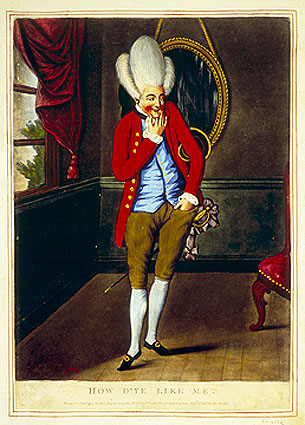
  18th century illustration of a "Molly" (contemporary term for an effeminate homosexual)
- 1726 – Three men (Gabriel Lawrence, William Griffin, and Thomas Wright) were hanged at Tyburn for sodomy following a raid of Margaret Clap's Molly House.
- 1727 – Charles Hitchen, a London Under City Marshal, was convicted of attempted sodomy at a Molly House. Hitchen had abused his position of power to extort bribes from brothels and pickpockets to prevent arrest, and he particularly leaned on the thieves to make them fence their goods through him. Hitchen had frequently picked up soldiers for sex, but had eluded prosecution.
- 1728 –18th century London Molly House, Julius Caesar Taylor's, Tottenham Court Road, Jenny Greensleeves' Molly House, Durham Yard, off The Strand, The Golden Ball, Bond's Stables, off Chancery Lane, Royal Oak Molly House, Giltspur Street, Smithfield and Three Tobacco Rolls Covent Garden were operating in London.
- 1730 – The term "lesbian" to describe same-sex relationships between women comes into use around the 1730s.
- 1735 – Conyers Place wrote "Reason Insufficient Guide to Conduct Mankind in Religion".
- 1736 – Love letters from Lord John Hervey to Stephen Fox PC, a British peer and Member of Parliament, show that they had been living in a homosexual relationship for a period of ten years, from 1726 to 1736.
- 1749 – Thomas Cannon wrote "Ancient and Modern Pederasty Investigated and Exemplified".
- 1772 – Captain Robert Jones was convicted of the capital offence of sodomising a thirteen-year-old boy. His trial started a public debate about homosexuality with the background of the 1772 Macaroni prosecutions considered Christian intolerance of homosexuality and the human rights of men who were homosexual. Jones received a pardon on condition that he leave the country. He ended up living in grandeur with his footman at Lyon, in the South of France.
- 1773 – Charles Crawford wrote "A Dissertation on the Phaedon of Plato".
- 1776 –18th century London gay bar, Harlequin (Nag's Head Court, Covent Garden) was operating
- 1778 - Eleanor Butler & Sarah Ponsonby, known as The Ladies of Llangollen, were two upper-class Irish women whose relationship scandalised and fascinated their contemporaries during the late 18th and early 19th centuries. The pair moved to a Gothic house in Llangollen, North Wales, in 1780 after leaving Ireland to escape the social pressures of conventional marriages. Over the years, numerous distinguished visitors called upon them. Guests included Shelley, Byron, Wellington and Wordsworth, who wrote a sonnet about them.
- 1785 – Jeremy Bentham becomes one of the first people to argue for the decriminalisation of sodomy in England, which was punishable by hanging. The essay Offences Against One's Self, written about 1785, argued for the liberalisation of laws prohibiting homosexual sex. He argued that homosexual acts did not weaken men, nor threaten population or marriage. The essay was only published two centuries later, in 1978.
- 1797 – The Encyclopædia Britannica published a brief mention of homosexuality in the article about Greece.

== 19th century ==
- 1806 – Yorkshire gentlewoman Anne Lister starts writing love letters to and from Eliza Raine. Lister actively participated in and wrote about her lesbian relationships in an encrypted diary. Although she did not use the word lesbian, at age thirty, she wrote, "I love and only love the fairer sex and thus, beloved by them in turn my heart revolts from any other love but theirs." In Warrington, 24 men were arrested for sodomy and related crimes in connection with a purported 'society'. Joseph Holland, Isaac Hitchen, Samuel Stockton, Thomas Rix and John Powell were tried at Lancaster for buggery and hung. George Ellis was found guilty of a misdemeanour and sentenced to 2 years in prison and pilloried.
- 1810 – The nineteenth century began with a wave of prosecutions against homosexual men. On 14 January, a farmer in West Yorkshire wrote in his diary that capital punishment seemed an unacceptably cruel response to a sexual behaviour that nature or God had ordained in an individual. (The diary entry was discovered in 2020.) On 8 July, the Bow Street Runners raided The White Swan, a tumbledown pub of Tudor origin near Drury Lane. Twenty-seven men were arrested on suspicion of sodomy and attempted sodomy.
- 1811 – The Scottish court case Woods and Pirie vs Dame Cumming Gordon showed two teachers are accused of having a lesbian relationship by a pupil, claiming they had indecent sexual relationships. However, one judge found that sex between women was "equally imaginary with witchcraft, sorcery or carnal copulation with the devil", illustrating notions at the time that tied sexuality with masculinity.
- 1812 – James Barry graduated from the Medical School of Edinburgh University as a doctor. Barry went on to serve as an army surgeon working overseas. Barry lived as a man but was found to have been female-bodied upon his death in 1865. David Thomas Myers was sentenced to be hung for an "abominable crime" with apprentice tailor Thomas Crow.
- 1816 - Waiter John Attwood Eglerton was convicted of buggering a groom and was sentenced to death. The judge in his case described his actions as "a crime subversive of every idea of virtue and manliness".
- 1828 – The Buggery Act 1533 was repealed and replaced by the Offences against the Person Act 1828. Buggery remained punishable by death.
- 1833 – 24-year old actor Lavinia Edwards was found dead. The corpse was taken to Guy's Hospital for an autopsy, where it was discovered that Edwards was 'a perfect man'. The Dorset Member of Parliament William John Bankes was arrested for committing sodomy with a soldier named Thomas Flowers in a urinal near the House of Commons.
- 1835 – The last two men to be executed in Britain for buggery, James Pratt and John Smith, were arrested on 29 August in London after being spied upon while having sex in a private room. They were hanged on 27 November, with James reportedly crying ‘Oh God, this is horrible, this is indeed horrible’ just before their deaths. The Police magistrate Hensleigh Wedgwood wrote in a letter to the Home Secretary that death was too harsh a punishment for the two men on the basis that no one was harmed and that the only reason for the death sentence in the case is that no lawyer wanted to defend such a "shameful crime". He also highlighted the class inequality in sodomy convictions, noting that richer men could more easily get away with the crime.
- 1838 – Harry Stokes was a master bricklayer, beerhouse manager and special constable in Manchester. He was assigned female at birth but lived as a man. Harry had two long-term relationships with women, both of which lasted over 20 years. In 1838 and 1859 his gender variance became the subject of local and national newspaper articles in which he was described as a 'man-woman' and a 'female husband'.
- 1857 - The Obscene Publications Act was passed which made it a criminal offence to produce written material ‘for the single purpose of corrupting the morals of youth and of a nature calculated to shock the common feelings of decency in any well-regulated mind.’
- 1861 – The death penalty for buggery was abolished when the Offences Against the Person Act 1828 was replaced with the Offences Against the Person Act 1861. A total of 8921 men had been prosecuted since 1806 for sodomy with 404 sentenced to death and 56 executed. Homosexuality remained illegal until 1967 in England and Wales and until 1980 in Scotland.
- 1866 – Marriage was defined as being between a man and a woman (preventing future same-sex marriages). In the case of Hyde v. Hyde and Woodmansee (a case of polygamy), Lord Penzance's judgment began "Marriage as understood in Christendom is the voluntary union for life of one man and one woman, to the exclusion of all others."
- 1871 – Ernest 'Stella' Boulton and Frederick 'Fanny' Park, two Victorian transvestites and suspected homosexuals, appeared as defendants in the celebrated Boulton and Park trial in London. The case was ravenously covered by the press across the country and it was labelled ‘the Great Petticoat Fiasco’ in The Grantham Journal. Boulton and Park were charged "with conspiring and inciting persons to commit an unnatural offence". The indictment was against Lord Arthur Clinton, Ernest Boulton, Frederic Park, Louis Hurt, John Fiske, Martin Cumming, William Sommerville and C. H. Thompson. The prosecution was unable to prove either that they had committed any homosexual offence or that men wearing women's clothing was an offence in English law. The defence lawyer was able to persuade the jury at the Old Bailey that the pair were merely two high-spirited young men with a taste for amateur theatrics. Boulton had an affair with Lord Arthur Clinton, during which he wore a wedding ring and had calling cards made with ‘Lady Stella Pelham Clinton’ engraved on them. Lord Arthur Clinton died by suicide before his trial.

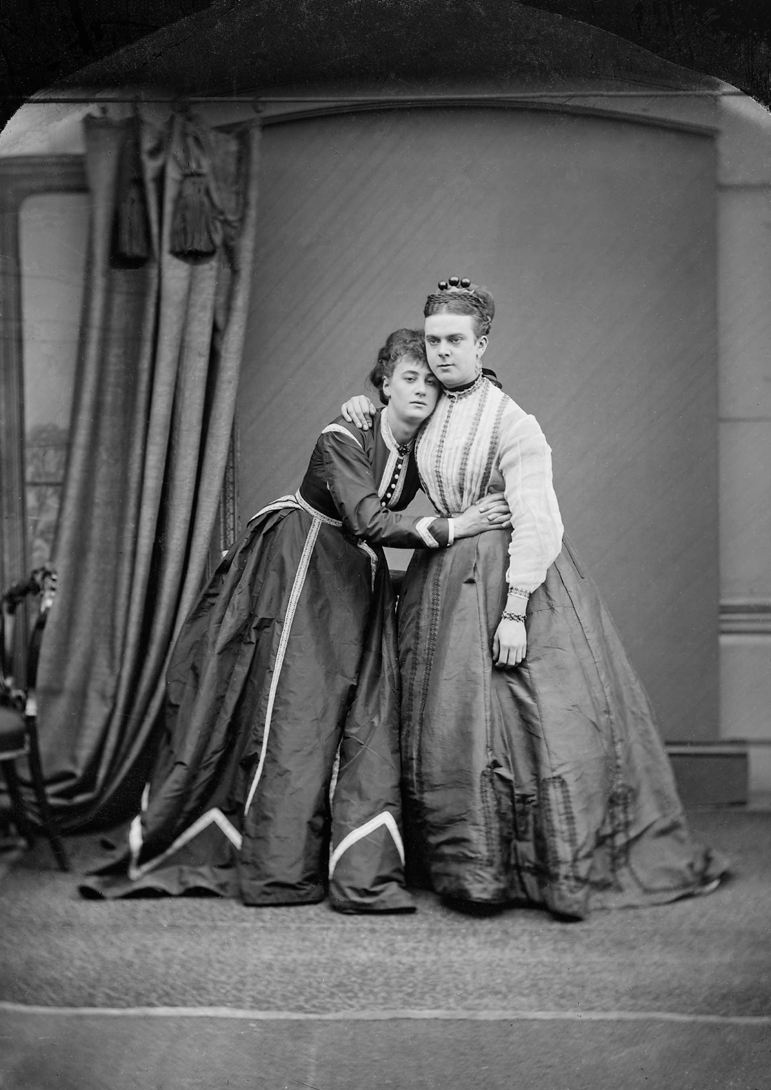
Fanny and Stella (Park & Boulton) on stage

- 1872 – Sheridan Le Fanu published the novella Carmilla, which depicts the tale of a lesbian vampire luring young women for her mother to sacrifice
- 1883 – John Maynard Keynes, Baron Keynes of Tilton, CB FBA was born. Openly homosexual, Keynes was a British economist whose ideas have profoundly affected the theory and practice of modern macroeconomics, as well as the economic policies of governments. He diarised his homosexual encounters and records that he had 65 encounters in 1909, 26 in 1910, and 39 in 1911.
- 1885 – The British Parliament enacted Criminal Law Amendment Act 1885, section 11 of which, known as the Labouchere Amendment, prohibited gross indecency between males. It thus became possible to prosecute homosexuals for engaging in sexual acts where buggery or attempted buggery could not be proven.
- 1885 – A collection of the poems of Sappho were translated and published in English by Henry Thornton Wharton as Sappho: Memoir, Text, Selected Renderings, and a Literal Translation. Wharton maintained a homosexual interpretation of "Ode to Aphrodite".
- 1889 – The Cleveland Street scandal occurred, when a homosexual male brothel in Cleveland Street, Fitzrovia, London, was raided by police after they discovered telegraph boys had been working there as rent boys. The teenage telegraph messenger Charles Thomas Swinscow was found carrying eighteen shillings (more than double his weekly wages) by the Postal Constable Luke Hanks, and revealed that the money had come from a ‘house of assignation’ on Cleveland Street. A number of aristocratic clients were discovered to be clients, including Lord Arthur Somerset, equerry to the Prince of Wales. The Prince of Wales's son Prince Albert Victor and Lord Euston were also implicated in the scandal. Scotland became the last jurisdiction in Europe to abolish the death penalty for same-sex sexual intercourse, which reduced the penalty to life imprisonment in a penitentiary.
- 1890 - The Chelsea Workhouse Scandal occurred after 35 year old kitchen porter John Bailey and his assistant and Workhouse inmate 16 year old Hugh Johnson were indicted for "inciting each other to the commission of unnatural offences". Bailey was found guilty of attempting buggery with Johnson and was sentenced to 5 years imprisonment, while the younger was given a conditional discharge on account of his age and the power imbalance in their positions.
- 1892 - Oscar Wilde popularised wearing green carnations on suit lapels to allude to queer sexuality when he asked his friends to wear them to a showing of his play Lady Windermere’s Fan.
- 1895 – Oscar Wilde is sentenced to two years in prison with hard labour for gross indecency over a relationship with Lord Alfred Douglas. The gay English poet A. E. Housman wrote a poem about the trial of Oscar Wilde. Due to its content, it was not published until after Housman's death. Friends and colleagues of Wilde were accused of having sex with other men by the press in a sensationalised witch hunt, such as the illustrator Aubrey Beardsley.
- Winston Churchill was accused of having committed "acts of gross immorality of the Oscar Wilde type" while a cadet at Sandhurst. Churchill sued the accuser for defamation and was awarded £400 in damages. Throughout his life, Churchill showed little interest in women other than his wife, enjoyed the company of homosexuals, and was deeply attached to male friends and his long-standing secretary Edward Marsh, although there is no evidence of any physical relationships.
- 1897 – George Cecil Ives organised the first homosexual rights group in England, the Order of Chaeronea. Dr Helen Boyle and her partner, Mabel Jones, set up the first women-run general practice in Brighton, including offering free therapy for poor women. Helen Boyle also founded the National Council for Mental Hygiene (which subsequently became MIND) in 1922. British sexologist Havelock Ellis published Sexual Inversion, the first volume in an intended series called Studies in the Psychology of Sex. He argues that homosexuality is not a disease but a natural anomaly occurring throughout human and animal history, and that it should be accepted, not treated. He describes lesbians as being more like men, possessing male intelligence and a propensity for independence. The book was banned in England for being obscene; the subsequent volumes in the series were published in the US and not sold in England until 1936.
- 1898 – George Bedborough was convicted of obscenity for selling a copy of Havelock Ellis's book Studies in the Psychology of Sex Vol. 2, on the topic of homosexuality.

== 20th century ==
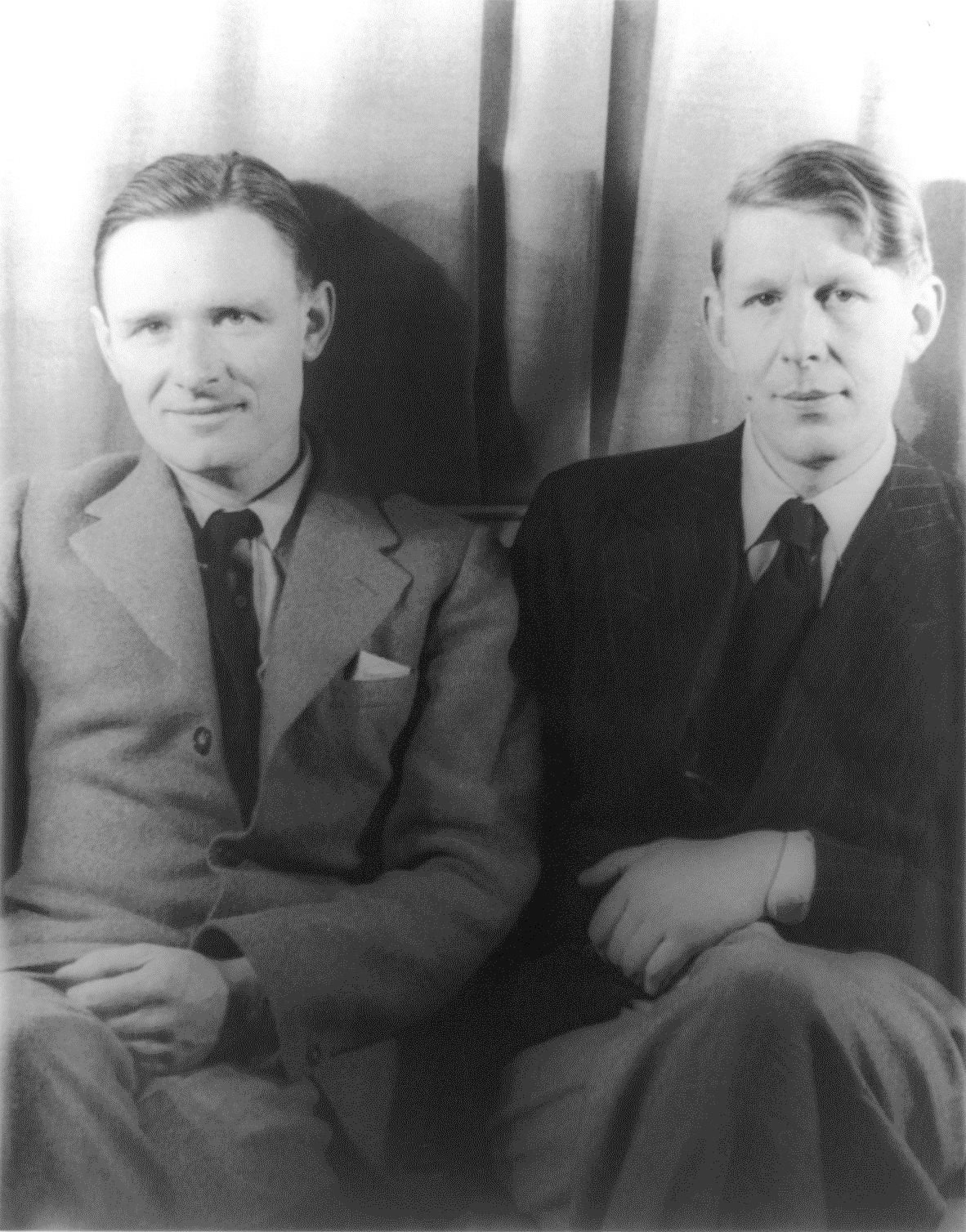
Christopher Isherwood (left) and W. H. Auden (right), photographed by Carl Van Vechten, 1939

- 1906 – Dr. Louisa Martindale set up a private practice in Brighton and became the first woman GP. With a group of other Brighton feminists she developed the New Sussex Hospital for Women and Children, where she was Senior Surgeon and Physician. She later became a specialist in the early treatment of cervical cancer and was appointed a CBE in 1931. Louisa lived with her partner, Ismay FitzGerald, for three decades and wrote of her love for her in her autobiography, A Woman Surgeon, published in 1951.
- 1909 – The transgender writer Irene Clyde published Beatrice the Sixteenth, a science fiction utopian novel set in a postgender society.
- 1909 – former Seaforth Highlander Clement Mitchell was put on trial in Bradford for desertion and fraud; they had been living as a woman since they left the regiment, living under the name May Wilson.
- 1910 – While homosexuals in London had always socialised in public places such as pubs, coffee houses and tea shops, it possibly became more overt. Waitresses ensured that a section of Lyons Corner House in Piccadilly Circus was reserved for homosexuals. The section became known as the Lily Pond.
- 1912 – London's first gay pub (as we now know the term), Madame Strindberg’s The Cave of the Golden Calf opened in Heddon Street, off Regent Street.
- 1913 – The British Society for the Study of Sex Psychology was founded by a group of theorists and activists, with Edward Carpenter as president. Carpenter was a proponent of the theory of the homosexual as a third sex and lived openly with his lover, George Merrill. The society was particularly concerned with homosexuality, aiming to combat legal discrimination against homosexuality with scientific understanding. Members included George Cecil Ives, Edward Carpenter, Montague Summers, Stella Browne, Laurence Housman, Havelock Ellis, George Bernard Shaw, and Ernest Jones.
- 1914 – The First World War broke out in August 1914 and homosexual writer Joe Randolph "J. R." Ackerley was commissioned as a second lieutenant and assigned to the 8th Battalion of the East Surrey Regiment. In June 1915, he was sent to France. On 1 July 1916 he was wounded at the Battle of the Somme. After lying wounded in a shell-hole for six hours, he was rescued and sent home for sick-leave. In May 1917, Ackerley led an attack in the Arras region where he was again wounded. While he awaited help, the Germans arrived and took him prisoner, assigning him to an internment camp in neutral Switzerland. There, he began his play, The Prisoners of War, which expresses the cabin fever of captivity and his frustrated longings for another male English prisoner.
- 1915 - Edith Lees wrote the first British play that suggested ‘sapphic’ love occurring between women, The Mothers.
- 1916 – Urania, a privately published feminist gender studies journal, was established. It challenged gender stereotypes and advanced the abolishment of gender; each issue is headed with the statement: "There are no 'men' or 'women' in Urania." Urania was edited by Eva Gore-Booth, Esther Roper, Irene Clyde, Dorothy Cornish, and Jessey Wade.
- 1917 - May Toupie Lowther, known as 'Toupie', was awarded the Croix de Guerre for her World War One efforts, which included the creation of an all-female ambulance unit. The unit travelled to France and close to the front line where they retrieved the wounded using their own cars. Lowther was a close friend of Radclyffe Hall, author of The Well of Loneliness and Hall drew on some of Lowther's experiences in depicting the life and character of its protagonist Stephen.
- 1918 – World War I ended. Army historian A.D. Harvey writes that "at least 230 soldiers were court-martialled, convicted and sentenced to terms of imprisonment for homosexual offences" during World War I. The gay English poet and writer W. H. Auden attended his first boarding school where he met Christopher Isherwood; when reintroduced to Isherwood in 1925, Auden probably fell in love with Isherwood, and in the 1930s they maintained a sexual friendship in intervals between their relations with others.

=== 1920s ===
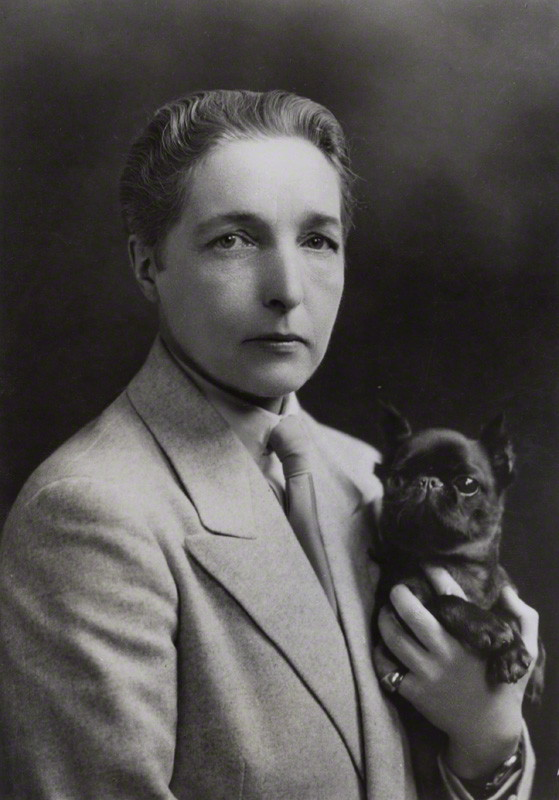
Radclyffe Hall

- 1921 – The Criminal Law Amendment Act was amended in the House of Commons by the Conservative MP Frederick Macquisten to include a section to make sexual "acts of gross indecency" between women illegal. It was passed in the House of Commons. However the section was defeated in the House of Lords, in part due to the belief that criminalizing lesbian sex would only increase the frequency of such acts. The Lord Chancellor, Frederick Smith, felt that "of every thousand women, taken as a whole, 999 have never even heard a whisper of these practices." As such, this amendment never became law.
- 1924 – Bertolt Brecht and Lion Feuchtwanger worked on an adaptation of Christopher Marlowe's Edward II about the homosexual life of Edward II and Piers Gaveston, 1st Earl of Cornwall that proved to be a milestone in Brecht's early theatrical and dramaturgical development.
- 1928 – The Well of Loneliness by Radclyffe Hall was published in the UK by Jonathan Cape. This sparked great legal controversy and brought the topic of homosexuality to public conversation. James Douglas, editor of the Sunday Express newspaper, began a campaign to suppress the book with poster and billboard advertising. Cape panicked and sent a copy of The Well of Loneliness to the Home Secretary, William Joynson-Hicks (a Conservative) for his opinion; he took only two days to reply that the work was "gravely detrimental to the public interest" and if Cape did not withdraw it voluntarily, criminal proceedings would be brought against him. Cape suppressed the book after only two editions.
- 1929 – The death of Edward Carpenter (29 August 1844 – 28 June 1929), an English socialist poet, socialist philosopher, anthologist, and early gay activist.

=== 1930s ===
- 1932 – Sir Noël Coward wrote "Mad About the Boy", a song which dealt with the theme of homosexual love; it was introduced in the 1932 revue, but due to the risque nature of the song, it was sung by a woman. The News of the World published a story, 'Amazing Change of Sex', about a trans man from Sussex who transitioned 'from Margery to Maurice', namely Colonel Sir Victor Barker (1895–1960) who married Elfrida Haward in Brighton. Barker's birth sex (female) was later revealed and the marriage was consequently annulled. Barker went on to appear in freak show displays in New Brighton, Southend-on-Sea and Blackpool.
- 1935 – Queer club culture in the 1930s was vibrant and varied, especially in the growing post-First World War underground scene. Music was central to the character of many of these venues, from the music hall artists to the expanding London jazz scene. At the centre of the action was the Shim Sham Club at 37 Wardour Street, an unlicensed jazz club popular with black and gay audiences, and its successor the Rainbow Roof.
- 1936 – A 30-year-old British athletic champion, Mark Weston of Plymouth, transitioned from female to male. The story appeared in some national newspapers, including the News of the World (31 May 1936). The reportage was accurate and sensitive. In the words of L. R. Broster, the Harley Street surgeon who treated him, 'Mark Weston, who has always been brought up as a female, is a male and should continue to live as such'. Nightwood by Djuna Barnes, a novel that portrays explicit homosexuality between women, was published in London by Faber and Faber.

=== 1940s ===
- 1940 – Throughout the forties, attitudes to homosexuality were relaxed. With conscription into the armed services, men and women were removed from their homes and families were relocated to a military life. John Howard described the services as being tolerant of 'homosex', which was same-sex sexual activity but which makes no assumption about the sexuality of its participants. In the Navy masturbation between seamen was known as a "flip". Jivani claims that in the Navy 'wingers' were sexual relationships between seamen of unequal rank and 'oppos' were sexual relationships between men of similar rank. In the army sex between men was often viewed by officers and other ranks as a legitimate response to the absence of women and the need for safe sexual relief. Both in the Army and the RAF the system of employing young boys as batmen who acted as orderlies for their officers was sometimes rooted in sex.
- 1940 – Urania, a feminist gender studies journal with strong pacifist editorial stance, ceased publication. The journal's goal was the abolition of gender in order to build a society of equal women whose sex and orientation were unimportant. Urania remained privately published for its 24-year history.
- 1939–1945 Blackouts during World War II afforded men many new opportunities for sexual encounters under the cover of complete darkness.
- 1945 – World War II ended. 6,508,000 men and women had served in the British Armed Forces during World War II. Following the war, moral attitudes to prostitution and homosexuality rapidly changed. The Public Morality Council declared that the police were once again 'conducting a campaign against this deplorable offence' (homosexual sex). In London, gay men in Piccadilly and Leicester Square were targeted and anyone caught charged with being "concerned together in committing an act of gross indecency".
- 1946 – Harold Gillies and a colleague carried out one of the first sex reassignment surgeries from female to male on Michael Dillon. In 1951 he and colleagues carried out one of the first modern sex reassignment surgeries from male to female on Roberta Cowell, using a flap technique which became the standard for 40 years.
- 1947 - The first female deputy chief medical officer at the Department of Health, Albertine Winner, was commissioned to write a report titled Homosexuality in Women. She wrote that ‘there are two categories of female homosexuals, the woman who tends to prefer the society of women and a much more dangerous type, the promiscuous Lesbian who may cause great harm and unhappiness.’
- 1948 - The Kinsey Reports estimated that the number of individuals in the United Kingdom that have experienced same-sex interest ranged from one to more than ten million. Ivor Cummings, an openly gay British civil servant with Sierra Leonean ancestry, welcomes the first immigrants of the Windrush generation, and his decisions on how to support them end up establishing Brixton as a modern hub for Britain's African Caribbean community. He is known as the "gay father of the Windrush generation." The British Broadcasting Corporation’s Variety Programmes Policy Guide, also known as the Green Book, outlined a ban of jokes about effeminacy in men, vulgarity or immorality of any kind.

=== 1950s ===
Throughout the Cold War period, anti-gay sentiment was high in the United States and the United Kingdom. This was later called the Lavender Scare. The then Home Secretary, Sir David Maxwell Fyfe, had promised "a new drive against male vice" that would "rid England of this plague." As many as 1,000 men were locked up in Britain's prisons every year amid a widespread police clampdown on homosexual offences. Undercover officers conducted plain clothes surveillance on places where gay men were known to meet. Sir Fyfe also introduced ‘positive vetting’ for recruits to the Foreign Office to identify queer men and stop them from being employed in the service. The prevailing mood has been described as one of barely concealed paranoia.

- 1950 – In Rotherham, an English schoolteacher, Kenneth Crowe, aged 37, was found dead wearing his wife's clothes and a wig. He had approached a man on his way home from the pub, who upon discovering Crowe was male, beat and strangled him. The killer, John Cooney, was found not guilty of murder and sentenced to five years for manslaughter.
- 1951 – Roberta Cowell, a former World War II Spitfire pilot, became the first transgender woman to undergo male-to-female confirmation surgery on 16 May. Cowell continued her career as a racing driver and published her autobiography in 1954. Ivor Novello, an Anglo-Welsh matinee idol, author, and composer noted for his hospitality and homosexuality, died.
- 1952 – Sir John Nott-Bower, commissioner of Scotland Yard began to weed out homosexuals from the British Government at the same time as McCarthy was conducting a federal homosexual witch hunt in the US.
- 1953 – John Gielgud, the actor-director, was arrested on 20 October in Chelsea for cruising in a public lavatory, and was subsequently fined. When the news broke he was in Liverpool on the pre-London tour of a new play. He was paralysed by nerves at the prospect of going onstage, but fellow players, led by Sybil Thorndike, encouraged him. The audience gave him a standing ovation, showing that they didn't care about his private life. The episode affected Gielgud's health and he suffered a nervous breakdown months later. He did not acknowledge publicly that he was gay.
- Edward Montagu (the 3rd Baron Montagu of Beaulieu) was charged and committed for trial at Winchester Assizes, firstly in 1953 for having underage sex with a 14-year-old boy scout at his beach hut on the Solent, a charge he always denied. The American Institute of Public Relations had just voted him the most promising young PR man when he was arrested. Although he enjoyed the support of his close family and a wide variety of friends, for a year or so he became "the subject of endless blue jokes and innumerable bawdy songs". This was not to be Montagu's first arrest during this witch hunt period.
- 1954 – Michael Pitt-Rivers and Peter Wildeblood were arrested and charged with having committed specific acts of "indecency" with RAF airmen Edward McNally and John Reynolds; they were also accused of conspiring with Edward Montagu (the 3rd Baron Montagu of Beaulieu) to commit these offences. The Director of Public Prosecutions gave his assurance that the witnesses Reynolds and McNally would not be prosecuted if they testified in court against the three defendants. Michael Pitt-Rivers, Montagu and Peter Wildeblood were tried in the Great Hall at Winchester in 1954. All three were convicted with two of the men sent to prison for 12 months and Wildeblood receiving an 18-month prison sentence. This set off a chain of events which would lead to the decriminalisation of homosexuality in 1967.

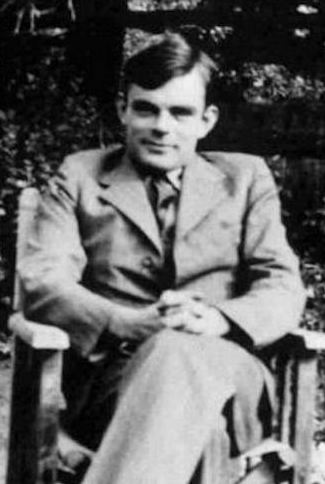
Alan Turing in 1930

- Alan Turing, an English mathematician, logician, cryptanalyst and computer scientist, influential in the development of computer science, died by suicide. He had been given a course of female hormones (chemical castration) by doctors as an alternative to prison after being prosecuted by the police for gross indecency
- 1954 –The Wolfenden Committee is formed with Sir John Wolfenden as chairman to examine Prostitution and Homosexuality. The publicity and outcome of the trial of Edward Montagu, Michael Pitt-Rivers and Peter Wildeblood which began on 15 March in the Great Hall in Winchester may have influenced the decision to set up an inquiry into Homosexuality.
- 1956 – The Sexual Offences Act recognises the crime of sexual assault between women.
- 1957 – The Report of the Departmental Committee on Homosexual Offences and Prostitution (better known as the Wolfenden report, after Lord Wolfenden) was published. It advised the British Government that homosexuality should be made legal (although this would take another decade).
- 1958 – The Homosexual Law Reform Society is founded in the United Kingdom following the Wolfenden report the previous year, to begin a campaign to make homosexuality legal in the UK.
- 1959 – Alan Horsfall, Labour councillor for Nelson, Lancashire, tables a motion to his local Labour party to back the decriminalisation of homosexuality. The motion is rejected, but Horsfall and fellow activist Antony Grey later form the North West Homosexual Law Reform Committee. ITV, at the time the UK's only national commercial broadcaster, broadcasts the UK's first gay TV drama, South, starring Peter Wyngarde.

=== 1960s ===
- 1961 – Victim was the first English-language film to use the word "homosexual". It premiered in the UK on 31 August 1961.
- 1963 – The Minorities Research Group (MRG) became the UK's first lesbian social and political organisation. They went on to publish their own lesbian magazine called Arena Three.
- 1964 – The North West Homosexual Law Reform Committee was founded, abandoning the medical model of homosexuality as a sickness and calling for its decriminalisation. The first meeting was held in Manchester. The North West branch of the national Homosexual Law Reform Committee became the national Committee for Homosexual Equality in 1969 and in 1971 after the advent of the Gay Liberation Front in 1970, changed its name to Campaign for Homosexual Equality.
- 1965 – In the House of Lords, Lord Arran proposed the decriminalisation of male homosexual acts (lesbian acts had never been illegal). A UK opinion poll finds that 93% of respondents see homosexuality as a form of illness requiring medical treatment.
- 1966 – In the House of Commons Conservative MP Humphry Berkeley introduce a bill to legalise male homosexual relations along the lines of the Wolfenden report. Berkeley was well known to his colleagues as a homosexual, according to a 2007 article published in The Observer and was unpopular. His Bill was given a second reading by 164 to 107 on 11 February, but fell when Parliament was dissolved soon after. Unexpectedly, Berkeley lost his seat in the 1966 general election, and ascribed his defeat to the unpopularity of his bill on homosexuality. The Beaumont Society, a London-based social/support group for people who cross-dress, are transvestite or who are transsexual, was founded. The society takes its name from Charles-Geneviève-Louis-Auguste-André-Timothée d'Éon de Beaumont (the Chevalier d'Éon) a French spy and diplomat, born a man, who lived as a woman for the last 33 years of her life, and after whom Havelock Ellis invented the term Eonism to refer to transgender conditions.
- 1967 – Ten years after the Wolfenden Report, MP Leo Abse introduced the Sexual Offences Bill 1967 supported by Labour MP Roy Jenkins, then the Labour Home Secretary. When passed, The Act decriminalised homosexual acts between two men over 21 years of age in private in England and Wales. The 1967 Act did not extend to Scotland, Northern Ireland, the Channel Islands or the Isle of Man, where all homosexual behaviour remained illegal. The privacy restrictions of the act meant a third person could not be present and men could not have sex in a hotel. These restrictions were overturned in the European Court of Human Rights in 2000.

The book Homosexual Behavior Among Males by Wainwright Churchill breaks ground as a scientific study approaching homosexuality as a fact of life and introduces the term "homoerotophobia", a possible precursor to "homophobia". The courts decided that transsexuals could not get married; Justice Ormerod found that in the case of Talbot (otherwise Poyntz) v. Talbot where one spouse was a post-operative transsexual their marriage was not permitted. Justice Ormerod stated that Marriage is a relationship which depends on sex, not on gender.

- 1969 – Campaign for Homosexual Equality (CHE) formed as the first British gay activist group. In Scotland, gay rights organisation the Scottish Minorities Group is founded by Ian Dunn (it was later known as Outright Scotland).

=== 1970s ===
- 1970 – Gay Liberation Front (GLF) was established at London School of Economics on 13 October by Aubrey Walter and Bob Mellors, in response to debates many gay men and lesbians were having in Britain about the way they were treated. The formation of Gay Liberation Front was also influenced by the Stonewall Rebellion in the USA that started on 28 June 1969.
- On the 27th of November 150 members of the Gay Liberation Front held a torchlight rally in Highbury Fields to protest against the continual harassment of the gay community in London by the police. In the case between April Ashley and Arthur Cameron Corbett, their marriage was annulled on the basis that Ashley, a transsexual woman, was a man under then-current British law. This set a legal precedent for trans people in Britain, meaning that the birth certificates of transsexual and intersex people could not be changed.
- 1971 – The Nationwide Festival of Light supported by Cliff Richard, Mary Whitehouse, Malcolm Muggeridge and Lord Longford was held by British Christians who were concerned about the development of the permissive society in the UK and in particular, homosexuality and out of wedlock sexual activity. The GLF interrupted the festival with a series of demonstrations. Lesbians invaded the platform of the Women's Liberation Conference in Skegness, demanding recognition The Nullity of Marriage Act was passed, explicitly banning marriages between same-sex couples in England and Wales. The parliamentary debates on the 1971 act included discussion on the issue of transsexualism but not homosexuality.
- 1972 – The First British Gay Pride Rally was held in London with an estimated 200–700 people marching from Trafalgar Square to Hyde Park. Gay News, Britain's first gay newspaper was founded.
- 1973 – London Icebreakers forms, offering a 24-hour helpline staffed exclusively by LGB people and offered gay-affirmative support. The Campaign for Homosexual Equality holds the first British gay rights conference in Morecambe, Lancashire. The Manchester Gay Alliance formed by the University's Lesbian & Gay Society, CHE, a lesbian group and transvestite/ transsexual group. In late 1973 Dr. Carol Steele and another transsexual woman (Linda B.) formed the Manchester TV/TS Group (a group for transvestites and transsexuals). Homosexuality was declassified as a mental illness in the United Kingdom, thanks to campaigning by the Gay Liberation Front’s Counter-Psychiatry Group in the 1960s and 1970s.
- 1974 – Maureen Colquhoun came out as the first Lesbian MP for the Labour Party. When elected she was married in a heterosexual marriage. After coming out, her party refused to support her. The First National TV/TS (Transvestite/Transsexual Conference) is held in Leeds. Jan Morris, one of Britain's top journalists who has covered wars and rebellions around the globe and climbed Mount Everest in 1952, publishes Conundrum, a personal account of her transition, widely hailed as a classic.

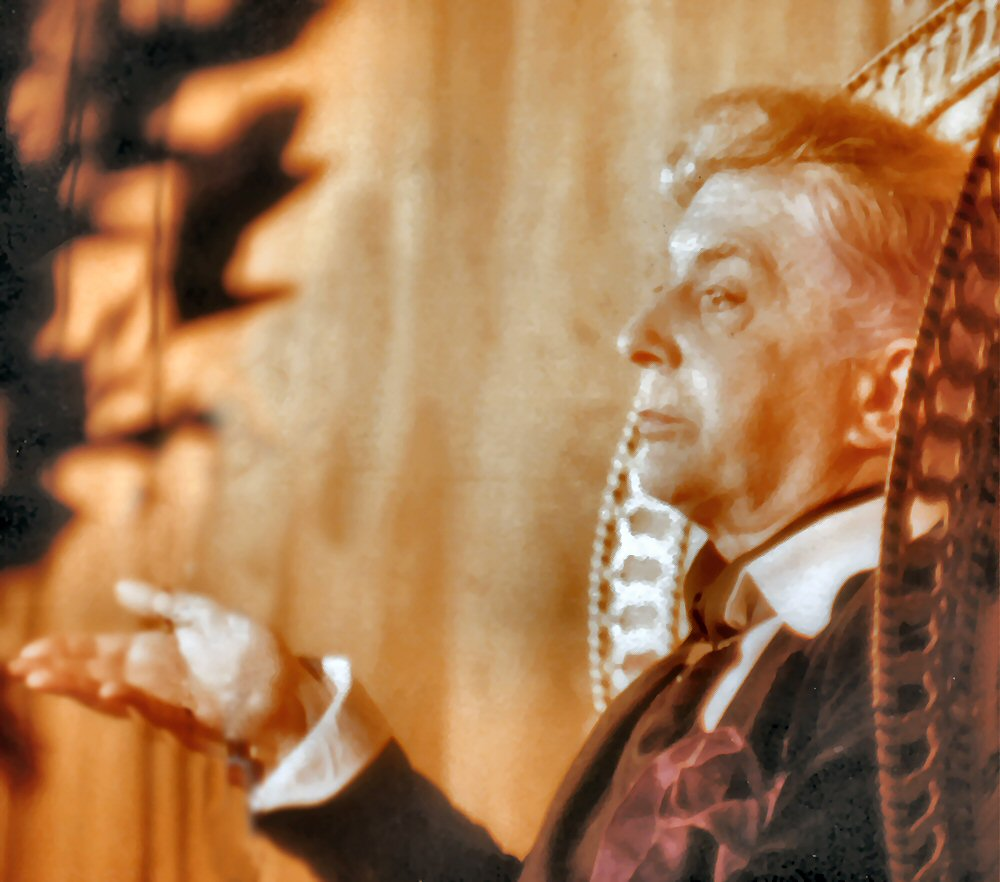
Quentin Crisp

- 1975 – The groundbreaking film portraying homosexual gay icon Quentin Crisp's life, The Naked Civil Servant (based on the 1968 autobiography and starring John Hurt) was transmitted by Thames Television for the British Television channel ITV. British journal Gay Left begins publication. British Home Stores sacked openly gay trainee Tony Whitehead; a national campaign subsequently picketed their stores. The Liberal Party passed a conference resolution in support of equality for gay people including an equal age of consent.
- 1976 – Britain's political pressure group Liberty, under its original name National Council for Civil Liberties (NCCL), called for an equal age of consent of 14 in Britain. The term Gay Bowel Syndrome was coined to describe a range of rectal diseases seen among gay male patients; in the pre-AIDS era, this is the first medical term to relate to gay men.
- 1976 – The London Gay Teenage Group was established by Phillip Cox and Paul Welch, building on foundations laid by the Campaign for Homosexual Equality. It was chaired by Steven Power, a 1970s gay activist, from 1977 until 1980 when he became 21. It was the first officially registered gay youth group in Europe.
- 1977 – The first gay lesbian Trades Union Congress (TUC) conference took place to discuss workplace rights for Gays and Lesbians.
- 1978 – The International Lesbian and Gay Association (ILGA) was founded as the International Gay Association (IGA) on 8 August during the conference of the Campaign for Homosexual Equality in Coventry, England, at a meeting attended by 30 men representing 17 organisations from 14 countries. The Coventry conference also called upon Amnesty International to take up the issue of persecution of lesbians and gays.
- 1979 – The Gay Humanist Group (later LGBT Humanists UK) was founded, launching at the Brighton conference of the Campaign for Homosexual Equality. The group sought to challenge "ignorance, superstition, dogma and bigotry", and "to encourage more gays and humanists to come out and declare themselves and their convictions with pride".

=== 1980s ===
The red ribbon is a symbol for solidarity with HIV-positive people and those living with AIDS

- 1980
  - The Criminal Justice (Scotland) Act 1980 decriminalised homosexual acts between two men over 21 years of age "in private" in Scotland.
  - British documentary A Change of Sex aired on BBC2, enabling viewers to follow the social and medical transition of Julia Grant; also provides a snapshot of the Gender Identity Clinic at Charing Cross Hospital in London.
  - The Self Help Association for Transsexuals (SHAFT) was formed as an information collecting and disseminating body for trans-people. The association later became known as 'Gender Dysphoria Trust International' (GDTI).
  - The first Black Gay and Lesbian Group was formed in the UK.
  - Lionel Blue became the first British rabbi to come out as gay.
  - The UK's first television series specifically aimed at a gay audience is broadcast on London Weekend Television. Called Gay Life, the programme airs late on Sundays and runs for two series.
  - Former British soldier and gay rights activist Dudley Cave establishes the "Lesbian and Gay Bereavement Project" to support bereaved lesbian and gay people who could not be legally recognised as next-of-kin.
- 1981
  - The European Court of Human Rights in Dudgeon v. United Kingdom struck down Northern Ireland's criminalisation of homosexual acts between consenting adults.
  - The first UK case of AIDS was recorded when a 49-year-old man was admitted to Brompton Hospital in London suffering from PCP (Pneumocystis carinii pneumonia). He died ten days later.
  - The first bisexual group in the United Kingdom, London Bisexual Group, was founded.
- 1982
  - The Homosexual Offences (Northern Ireland) Order 1982 decriminalised homosexual acts between two men over 21 years of age "in private" in Northern Ireland.
  - Terry Higgins dies of AIDS in St Thomas' Hospital London, his friends and partner Martyn Butler set up the Terry Higgins Trust (which became the Terrence Higgins Trust), the first UK AIDS charity.
- 1983
  - Britain reports 17 cases of AIDS.
  - Gay men are asked not to donate blood.
  - UK Crown Dependency Guernsey (Including Alderney, Herm and Sark) decriminalised homosexuality.
  - London's Gay Pride event changes its name to Lesbian & Gay Pride.
- 1984
  - Chris Smith, newly elected to the UK parliament declares: "My name is Chris Smith. I'm the Labour MP for Islington South and Finsbury, and I'm gay", making him the first openly out homosexual politician in the UK parliament.
  - Britain reports 108 cases of AIDS with 46 deaths (from AIDS).
  - The Politics of Bisexuality signals the growth of separate bisexual community organising.
  - Lesbians and Gays Support the Miners, a campaign of LGBT support for striking workers in the miners' strike of 1984 and 1985, is launched.
- 1985
  - AIDS hysteria grows in the UK when passengers on the Queen Elizabeth 2 curtailed their holiday as a person with AIDS was discovered on board. Cunard were criticised for trying to cover this up.
  - A London support group Body Positive was set up as a self-help group for people affected by HTLV-3 and AIDS.
  - Health Minister, Kenneth Clarke, enacted powers to detain people with AIDS in hospital against their will, potentially preventing people coming forward for treatment.
  - Once the only gay bar in Brixton and cornerstone of the 1970s Black LGBT community, bisexual Jamaican immigrant Pearl Alcock's shebeen closes.
- 1986
  - Mark Rees, a trans-man, brings a case to the European Court of Human Rights, stating that UK law prevented him from gaining legal status recognising him as male. The case was lost but the court noted the seriousness of the issues facing trans people.
- 1987
  - Conservative Prime Minister Margaret Thatcher at the 1987 Conservative party conference, issued the statement stating "Children who need to be taught to respect traditional moral values are being taught that they have an inalienable right to be gay". Backbench Conservative MPs and Peers had already begun a backlash against the 'promotion' of homosexuality and, in December 1987, Clause 28 is introduced into the local government bill by Dame Jill Knight, Conservative MP for Birmingham Edgbaston.
  - The first UK specialist HIV ward was opened by Diana, Princess of Wales; at the opening she made a point of not wearing protective gloves or a mask when she shook hands with the patients.
  - AZT, the first HIV drug to show promise of suppressing the disease was made available in the UK for the first time.
  - In Manchester, Operation Spanner carried out by police resulted in group of homosexuals being convicted for assault occasioning actual bodily harm for their involvement in consensual sadomasochism over a ten-year period.

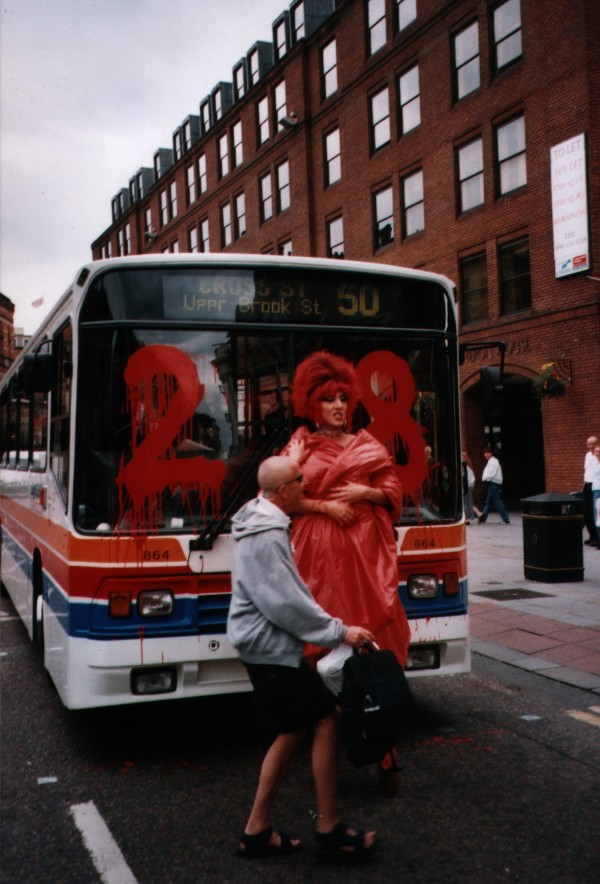
Activists target a bus operated by Brian Souter's Stagecoach company at a rally in Albert Square, Manchester, on 15 July 2000

- 1988
  - Section 28 of the Local Government Act 1988 enacted as an amendment to the United Kingdom's Local Government Act 1986, on 24 May 1988 stated that a local authority "shall not intentionally promote homosexuality or publish material with the intention of promoting homosexuality" or "promote the teaching in any maintained school of the acceptability of homosexuality as a pretended family relationship". The act was introduced by Margaret Thatcher. Almost identical legislation was enacted for Scotland by the Westminster Parliament.
  - Princess Margaret opens the UK's first residential support centre for people living with HIV and AIDS in London at London Lighthouse.
  - Sir Ian McKellen came out on BBC Radio 3 in response to the governments proposed Section 28 in the British Parliament. McKellen has stated that he was influenced in his decision by the advice and support of his friends, among them noted gay author Armistead Maupin.
- 1989
  - The campaign group Stonewall UK is set up to oppose Section 28 and other barriers to equality.

=== 1990s ===
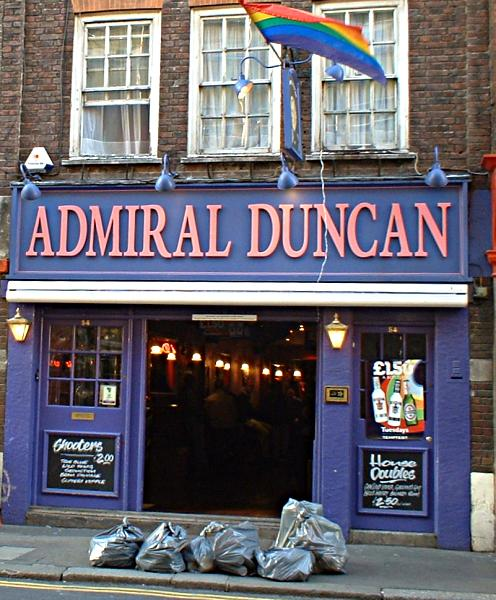
London gay pub bombing in 1999 killed three and injured 70

- 1990
  - In July, following the murders in a short period of time, of Christopher Schliach, Henry Bright, William Dalziel and Michael Boothe, hundreds of lesbians and gay men marched from the park where Boothe had been killed to Ealing Town Hall and held a candlelit vigil. The demonstration led to the formation of OutRage, who called for the police to start protecting gay men instead of arresting them.
  - In September, lesbian and gay police officers established the Lesbian and Gay Police Association (Lagpa/GPA).
  - The first gay pride event in Manchester is held.
  - Oranges Are Not the Only Fruit by Jeanette Winterson, a semi-autobiographical screenplay about her lesbian life was shown on BBC television.
  - Justin Fashanu became the first professional footballer to come out in the press (he subsequently died by suicide).
  - Northern Ireland held their first Pride Parade.
  - UK Crown Dependency of Jersey decriminalised homosexuality.
- 1991
  - Gay Activist, Derek Jarman makes the Christopher Marlowe play Edward II from the early 1590s into a film which used modern costumes and made overt reference to the gay rights movement and the Stonewall riots.
  - Queen singer Freddie Mercury announced that he had AIDS; he dies the following day.
- 1992
  - UK Crown Dependency of Isle of Man repealed sodomy laws (homosexuality was still illegal until 1994).
  - The first Pride Festival was held in Brighton.
  - Europride was inaugurated in London and was attended by estimated crowds of over 100,000.
  - Britain's first black gay play Boy with Beer by Paul Boakye opened in January at The Man in the Moon Theatre with nudity, simulated sex, and AIDS as a core concern.
  - Acclaimed 20th century artist Francis Bacon died of pneumonia complicated by asthma while visiting a friend in Madrid.
- 1993
  - The radio DJ and comedian Kenny Everett and singer with the group Frankie goes to Hollywood, Holly Johnson, announced that they were HIV positive.
  - Serial killer Colin Ireland was convicted of killing five gay men, who he picked up in the Coleherne leather bar. He was sentenced to life and died in 2012.
- 1994
  - The Conservative Member of Parliament Edwina Currie introduced an amendment to lower the age of consent for homosexual acts, from 21 to 16 in line with that for heterosexual acts. The vote was defeated and the gay male age of consent was instead lowered to 18. The lesbian age of consent was not set.
  - UK Crown Dependency of Isle of Man decriminalised homosexuality.
  - Charity Save the Children dropped lesbian Sandi Toksvig as compere of its 75th-anniversary celebrations after she came out, but following a direct action protest by the Lesbian Avengers, Save the Children apologised.
  - British filmmaker Derek Jarman died of AIDS. Jarman had been a film-maker, artist and gay rights activist who became a major cultural figure in the late 1980s.
- 1995
  - The BBC's first regular TV show aimed at the LGBT community, Gaytime TV first aired on BBC Two.
- 1996
  - A breakthrough is made in the area of AIDS treatment; Highly Active Antiretroviral Therapy (HAART) is found to significantly delay the onset of AIDS in people living with HIV. The NHS makes the treatment available in the UK. HAART has a dramatic effect and many bed ridden AIDS patients return to work.
  - The European Court of Human Rights heard Morris v. The United Kingdom and Sutherland v. the United Kingdom, cases brought by Chris Morris and Euan Sutherland challenging the homosexual inequality in divided ages of consent. The government stated its intention to legislate to negate the court cases, which were put on hold.
  - The landmark case – P v S and Cornwall County Council – finds that an employee who was about to undergo gender reassignment was wrongfully dismissed. It was the first piece of case law, anywhere in the world, which prevented discrimination in employment or vocational education because someone is trans.

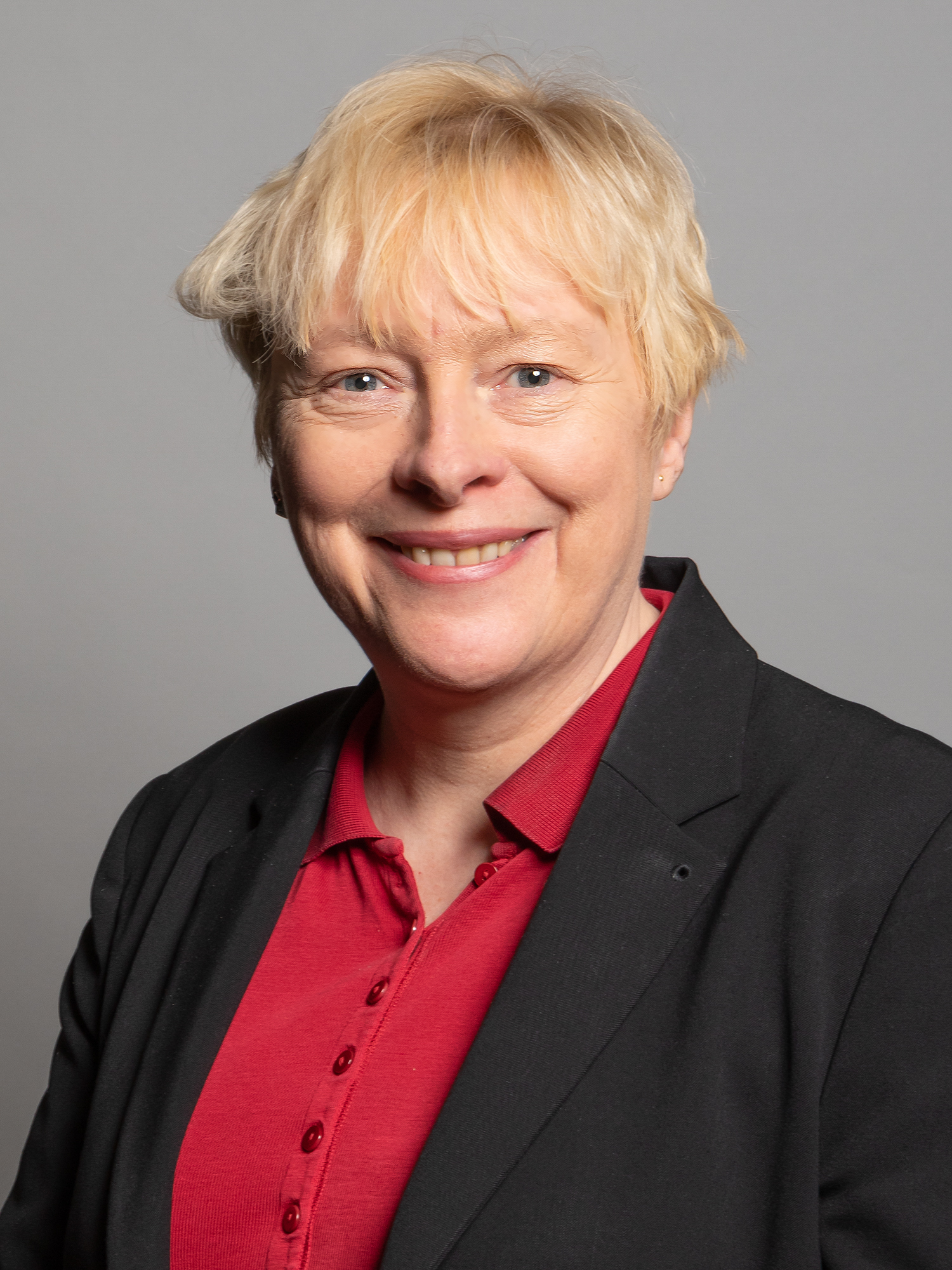
Angela Eagle

- 1997
  - Angela Eagle, Labour MP for Wallasey, becomes the first MP to come out voluntarily as a lesbian.
  - Gay partners were given equal immigration rights.
  - Equality Network was established in Scotland.
- 1998
  - The Bolton 7, a group of gay and bisexual men were convicted at Bolton Crown Court of the offences of gross indecency under the Sexual Offences Act 1956 and of age of consent offences under the Criminal Justice and Public Order Act 1994. Although gay sex was partially decriminalised by the Sexual Offences Act 1967, they were all convicted under section 13 of the 1956 Act because more than two men had sex together, which was still illegal.
  - Lord Alli, a Labour Party life peer, becomes the first openly gay member of the House of Lords and one of a few openly gay Muslims.
  - The Labour party introduced an amendment to Crime and Disorder Bill to set the age of consent at 16 for homosexual men. The amendment was then removed by the House of Lords.
- 1999
  - In May, the Admiral Duncan, a gay pub in Soho was bombed by former British National Party member David Copeland, killing three people and wounding at least 70.
  - Queer Youth Alliance was formed.
  - Gay drama series Queer as Folk debut on Channel 4.
  - The equal age of consent to the Crime and Disorder Bill proposed by the Labour government was blocked again in the House of Lords after a campaign headed by Conservative MP Baroness Young.
  - Stephen Twigg became the first openly gay politician to be elected to the House of Commons.
  - Michael Cashman became the first openly gay UK member elected to the European Parliament.
  - The British Museum acquired the Warren Cup for £1.8 million to prevent its going abroad which was, at that time, the most expensive single item ever acquired by The British Museum. The cup depicts homosexual acts between Ancient Greek and Roman men and boys.

== 21st century ==
=== 2000s ===
- 2000
  - The Labour government stops banning homosexuals from the armed forces after the European Court of Human Rights rules it unlawful. The law will not actually be repealed until the Armed Forces Act 2016.
  - The Labour government introduces legislation to repeal Section 28 in England and Wales – Conservative MPs oppose the move - but the bill is defeated by bishops and Conservatives in the House of Lords.
  - Scotland abolished Clause 2a (Section 28) of the Local Government Act in October though it remains in place in England and Wales.
  - HIV charity London Lighthouse merged with Terrence Higgins Trust as the Aled Richards Trust and Body Positive London, closed. Shrinkage of the HIV charity sector occurred largely as a result of Management of HIV/AIDS HAART treatment allowing people living with HIV to be more self-sufficient.

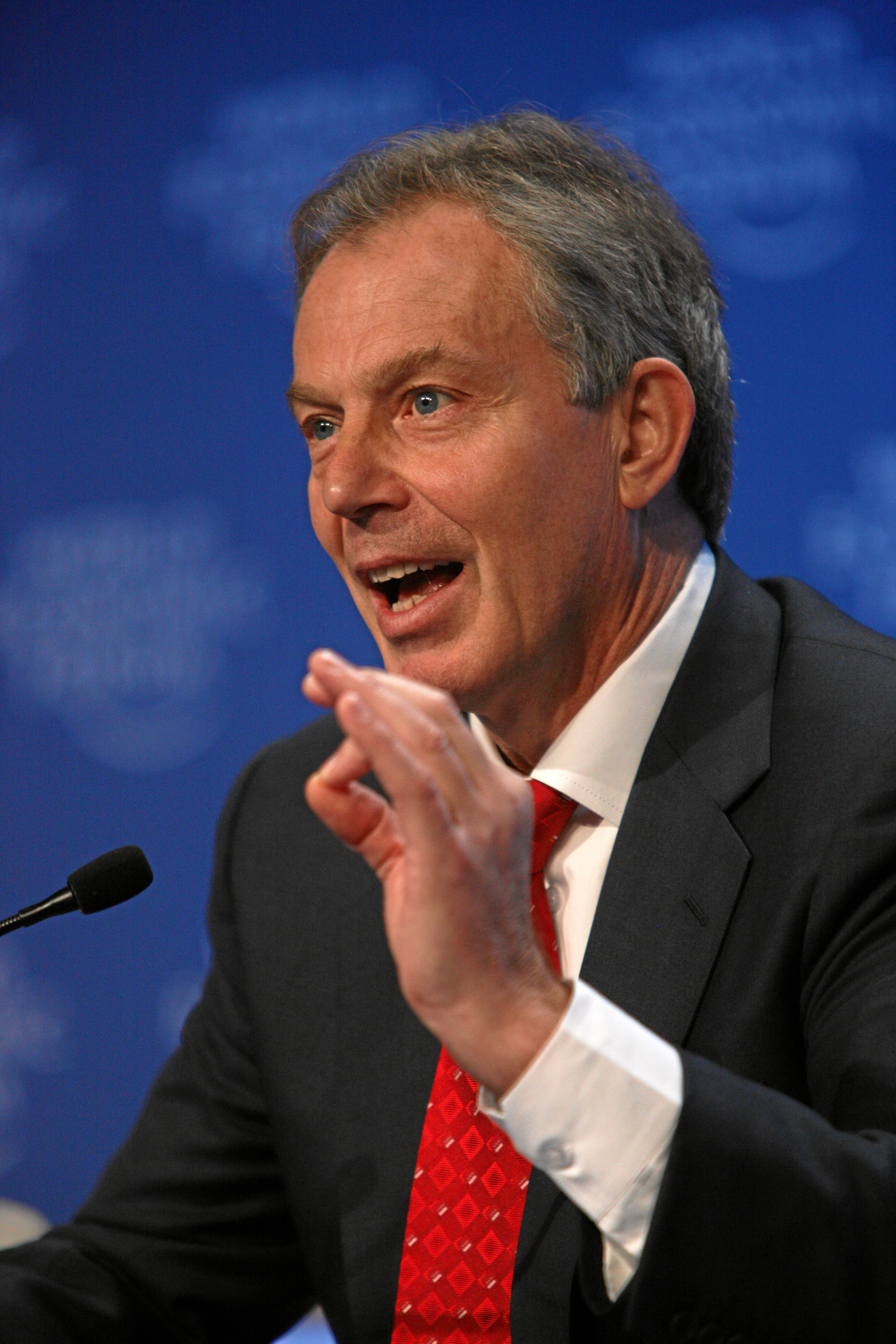
Tony Blair's Labour government enacted the Civil Partnership Act 2004

- 2001
  - The last two pieces of unequal law regarding gay male sex are changed. In 1997 the European Commission of Human Rights found that the European Convention on Human Rights were violated by a discriminatory age of consent; the government submitted that it would propose a Bill to Parliament for a reduction of the age of consent for homosexual acts from 18 to 16. The Crime and Disorder Bill which proposed these amendments, was voted for in the House of Commons but rejected in the House of Lords. In 1998 it was reintroduced and again was voted for in the House of Commons but rejected in the House of Lords. It was reintroduced a third time in 1999 but the House of Lords amended it to maintain the age of consent at 18 for both sexes. Provisions made in the Parliament Acts 1911 and 1949 made it possible to enact the bill without the Lords voting it through. The provisions of the Act came into force throughout the United Kingdom on 8 January 2001, lowering the age of consent to 16. Under the act consensual group sex for gay men is also decriminalised.
- 2002
  - The Adoption and Children Act 2002 is passed, granting same-sex couples equal rights to adopt, though it does not come into effect immediately
  - Alan Duncan becomes the first Conservative MP to admit being gay without being pushed.
  - Brian Dowling becomes the first openly gay children's television presenter in the UK on SMTV Live.
  - In December 2002, the British Lord Chancellor's office publishes a Government Policy Concerning Transsexual People document that categorically states, "What transsexualism is not ... It is not a mental illness."
- 2003
  - Section 28, which banned councils and schools from intentionally promoting homosexuality, is repealed in England and Wales and Northern Ireland. Employment Equality Regulations made it illegal to discriminate against lesbians, gays or bisexuals at work.
  - EuroPride was hosted in Manchester.
  - Celia Kitzinger and Sue Wilkinson, both British university professors, legally married in British Columbia, Canada, however on their return their same-sex marriage was not recognised under British law. Under the subsequent Civil Partnership Act 2004, it was instead converted into a civil partnership. The couple sued for recognition of their same-sex marriage.
- 2004
  - The Civil Partnership Act 2004 is passed by the Labour Government, giving same-sex couples the same rights and responsibilities as married heterosexual couples in England, Scotland, Northern Ireland and Wales.
  - The Gender Recognition Act 2004 is passed by the Labour Government giving people with gender dysphoria legal recognition as members of the sex appropriate to their gender identity (male or female) and allowing them to acquire a Gender Recognition Certificate, affording them full recognition of their acquired sex in law for all purposes, including marriage.
  - Alan Hollinghurst became the first openly-gay author to win the Booker Prize, a historic event in LGBTQ British Literature.
- 2005
  - The first civil partnership formed under the Civil Partnership Act 2004 took place at 11:00 GMT 5 December between Matthew Roche and Christopher Cramp at St Barnabas Hospice, Worthing, West Sussex. The statutory 15-day waiting period was waived as Roche was suffering from a terminal illness: he died the following day.
  - The first partnership registered after the normal waiting period was held in Belfast on 19 December.
  - The Adoption and Children Act 2002 comes into force in England and Wales, allowing unmarried and same-sex couples to adopt children for the first time.
  - Twenty-four-year-old Jody Dobrowski is murdered on Clapham Common in a homophobic attack.
  - Chris Smith one of the first openly gay British MPs, (1984), becomes the first MP to acknowledge that he is HIV positive.
  - The UK-based online newspaper PinkNews is launched, which is specifically marketed to the LGBT community.
- 2006
  - The Equality Act 2006 which establishes the Equality and Human Rights Commission (CEHR) and makes discrimination against lesbians and gay men in the provision of goods and services illegal, gains royal assent on 16 February.
  - The age of consent is equalised and Section 28 "successfully repealed" in the UK Crown Dependency of the Isle of Man.
  - Labour MP, Ben Bradshaw holds a civil partnership ceremony with partner, Neal Dalgleish, a BBC Newsnight journalist.
  - David Borrow, a Labour MP also holds a civil partnership with his boyfriend in May.
  - In May, Margot James becomes the first 'out' lesbian to be elected as a local councillor for the Brompton ward of Kensington & Chelsea. She subsequently became the first Tory Lesbian MP.
  - In total 3,648 couples formed civil partnerships in England and Wales between 21 December 2005 and 31 January 2006. Male partnerships are more popular (2,150 ceremonies) than women's (1,138).
- 2007
  - The Equality Act (Sexual Orientation) Regulations becomes law on 30 April making discrimination against lesbians and gay men in the provision of goods and services illegal. Archbishop Vincent Nichols of Birmingham declared his opposition to the act, saying that the legislation contradicted the Catholic Church's moral values. He supported efforts to have Catholic adoption agencies exempted from sexual orientation regulations (they were ultimately successful in a judgement given on 17 March 2010).
  - Some 8,728 Civil Partnerships were conducted in 2007.
  - Dr Lewis Turner and Professor Stephen Whittle publish Engendered Penalties Transsexual and Transgender People's Experience of Inequality and Discrimination (Equalities Review) which is instrumental in ensuring the inclusion of trans people in the remit of the new Commission for Equalities and Human Rights.
  - Channel 4 released Clapham Junction, a TV drama partially based on the murder of Jody Dobrowski almost two years after his murder, to mark the 40th anniversary of decriminalisation of homosexuality in England and Wales.
  - Four openly gay, lesbian or bisexual MSPs are elected in the 2007–2011 Scottish Parliament, Ian Smith, Patrick Harvie, Margaret Smith and Joe FitzPatrick.
- 2008
  - Treatment of lesbian parents and their children is equalised in the Human Fertilisation and Embryology Act 2008. The legislation allows for lesbians and their partners (both civil and de facto) equal access to legal presumptions of parentage in cases of in vitro fertilisation ("IVF") or assisted/self insemination (other than at home) from the moment the child is born.
  - Angela Eagle becomes the first female MP to enter into a civil partnership (with partner Maria Exall).
  - Parliament passes provisions in the Criminal Justice and Immigration Act, creating a new offence of incitement to homophobic hatred. Some 7,169 Civil partnerships were conducted in 2008.
  - Michael Causer, a gay teenager living in Liverpool, is seriously assaulted on 25 July because of his sexual orientation and later dies in hospital, aged 18.
- 2009
  - The Labour Government Prime Minister Gordon Brown makes an official public apology on behalf of the British government for the way in which Alan Turing was chemically castrated for being gay, after the war.
  - Opposition leader David Cameron apologises on behalf of the Conservative Party, for introducing Section 28 during Margaret Thatcher's third government.
  - Welsh rugby star Gareth Thomas becomes the first known top-level professional male athlete in a team sport to come out while still active in professional sport.
  - Nikki Sinclaire becomes the first openly lesbian member of the European Parliament for the UK delegation. Some 6,281 Civil Partnerships were conducted in 2009.

=== 2010s ===
- 2010
  - Pope Benedict XVI condemns British equality legislation for running contrary to "natural law" as he confirmed his first visit to the UK.
  - The Equality Act 2010 makes discrimination on grounds of gender reassignment and sexual orientation in employment and in the provision of goods and services illegal.
  - The Supreme Court ruled that two gay men from Iran and Cameroon have the right to asylum in the UK and Lord Hope, who read out the judgment, said: To compel a homosexual person to pretend that his sexuality does not exist or suppress the behaviour by which to manifest itself is to deny him the fundamental right to be who he is.
  - Some 6,385 Civil Partnerships were conducted in Britain in 2010, 49% were men.
  - Claire Rayner, ally of the gay rights movement, dies.
  - Shadow Home Secretary Chris Grayling MP said that he thought bed and breakfast owners should be able to bar gay couples, however, under the Equality Act (Sexual Orientation) Regulations 2007 no-one can be refused goods or services on the grounds of their sexuality. Grayling subsequently was passed over as Home Secretary when the Coalition government came to power.
  - Parental orders for gay men and their partners became possible on 6 April 2010, reassigning the legal parents for gay men parenting children under surrogacy arrangements.

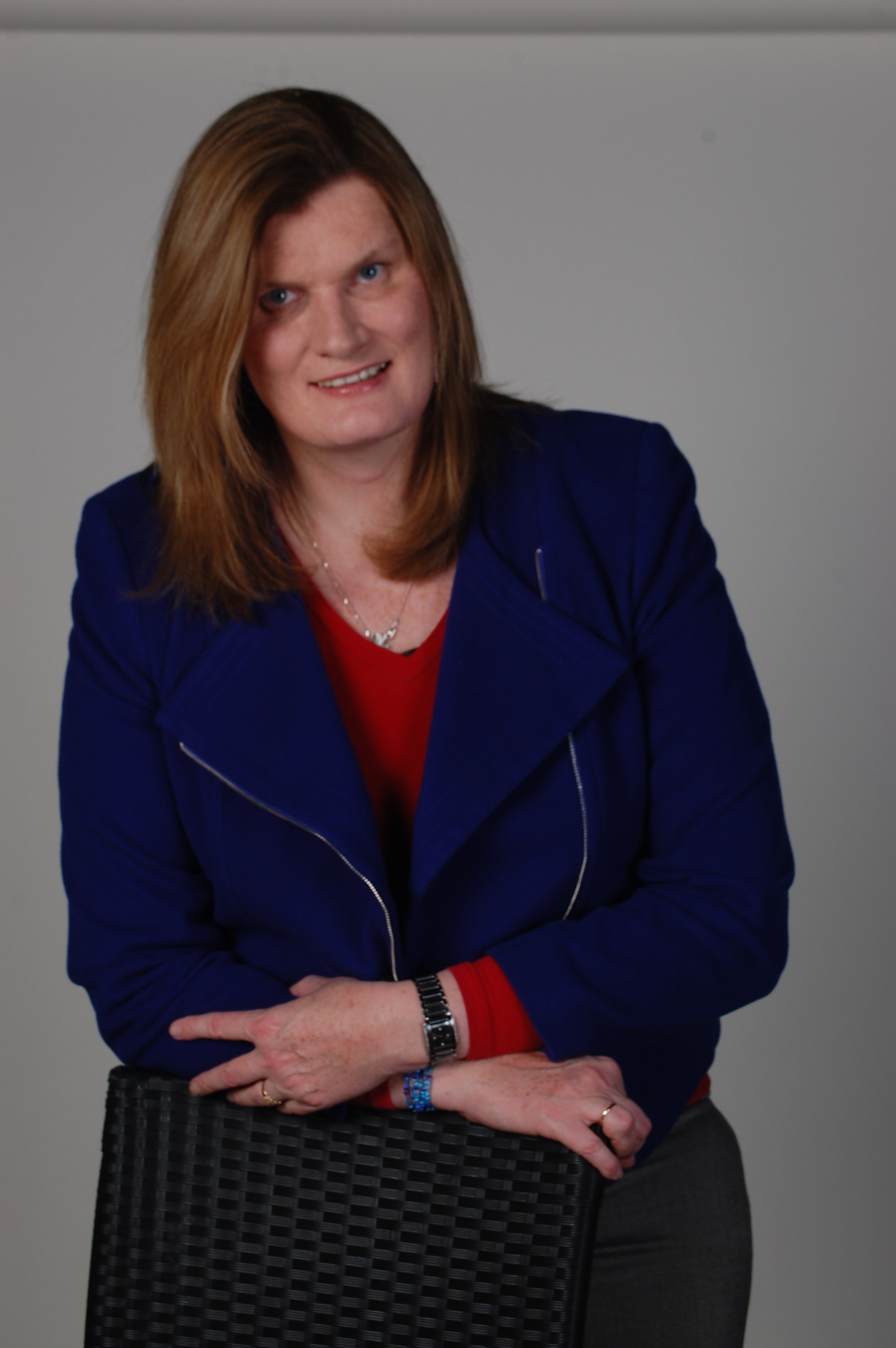
Nicole Sinclaire

- 2011
  - England, Wales and Scotland allow gay and bi men to donate blood after a 1-year deferral period.
- 2012
  - In the year in which London hosted the Olympic Games, London hosts World Pride but the committee fails to secure funding and has to drastically cut back the parade and cancel many of the events.
  - The coalition government committed to legislate for gay marriage by 2015, but by 2012 still had not been included in the Queen's Speech.
  - Thousands of people sign an e-petition to feature Alan Turing, father of Computing and of Artificial Intelligence on the ten pound note.
  - Government Ministers pledge to push through legislation granting same-sex couples equal rights to get married despite the threat of a split with the Church of England and the continuance of current arrangements for the state recognition of canon law.
- 2013
  - The coalition government unveils its Marriage (Same Sex Couples) Bill on 25 January. On 21 May it passes its third reading in the House of Commons by a vote of 366 to 161. Altogether 133 Tories opposed the bill, along with 15 Labour MPs, four Lib Dems, eight Democratic Unionists and an independent. On 17 July 2013, royal assent is given to the Marriage (Same Sex Couples) Act 2013.
  - Queen Elizabeth II grants Alan Turing a posthumous pardon.
  - Nikki Sinclaire comes out as transgender, thus becoming the United Kingdom's first openly transgender Parliamentarian.
  - Civil partners Martyn Hall and Steven Preddy were successful in their case against B&B owners Peter and Hazelmary Bull. Hall and Preddy were refused a double room at the Bulls' B&B, Chymorvah Guest House, which courts found was in contravention of the 2007 Equality Act Regulations.
- 2014
  - Same-sex marriage becomes legal in England and Wales on 29 March under the Marriage (Same Sex Couples) Act 2013. The first couple to wed were Peter McGraith and David Cabreza, who walked out from their ceremony in Islington Town Hall to a crowd of supporters waving placards and rainbow flags. Mr McGraith addressed the crowd and said: ‘very few countries afford their gay and lesbian citizens equal marriage rights and we believe that this change in law will bring hope and strength to gay men and lesbians in Nigeria, Uganda, Russia, India and elsewhere, who lack basic equality and are being criminalised for their sexual orientation.’ Campaigner Peter Tatchell was one of the witnesses to the marriage.
  - Legislation to allow same-sex marriage in Scotland was passed by the Scottish Parliament in February 2014, received royal assent on 12 March 2014 and took effect on 16 December 2014.
  - Queen Elizabeth II praises the London Lesbian and Gay Switchboard for their 40-year history, the first time the Crown has ever publicly supported the LGBT community. The Switchboard receives a comment from the Queen saying: "Best wishes and congratulations to all concerned on this most special anniversary."
- 2015
  - Mikhail Ivan Gallatinov and Mark Goodwin became the first couple to have a same-sex wedding in a UK prison after marrying at Full Sutton Prison in East Yorkshire.
  - Northern Ireland's assembly voted narrowly in favour of gay marriage equality but the largest party in the devolved parliament, the Democratic Unionist Party, subsequently vetoed any change in the law.
  - The Royal Vauxhall Tavern became the first ever building in the UK to be given a special "listing" status based on its LGBT history; it was accorded Grade II listed status by the UK's Department of Culture, Media and Sport.
  - Inga Beale, CEO of Lloyd's of London, became the first woman and the first openly bisexual person to be named number one in the OUTstanding & FT Leading LGBT executive power list.

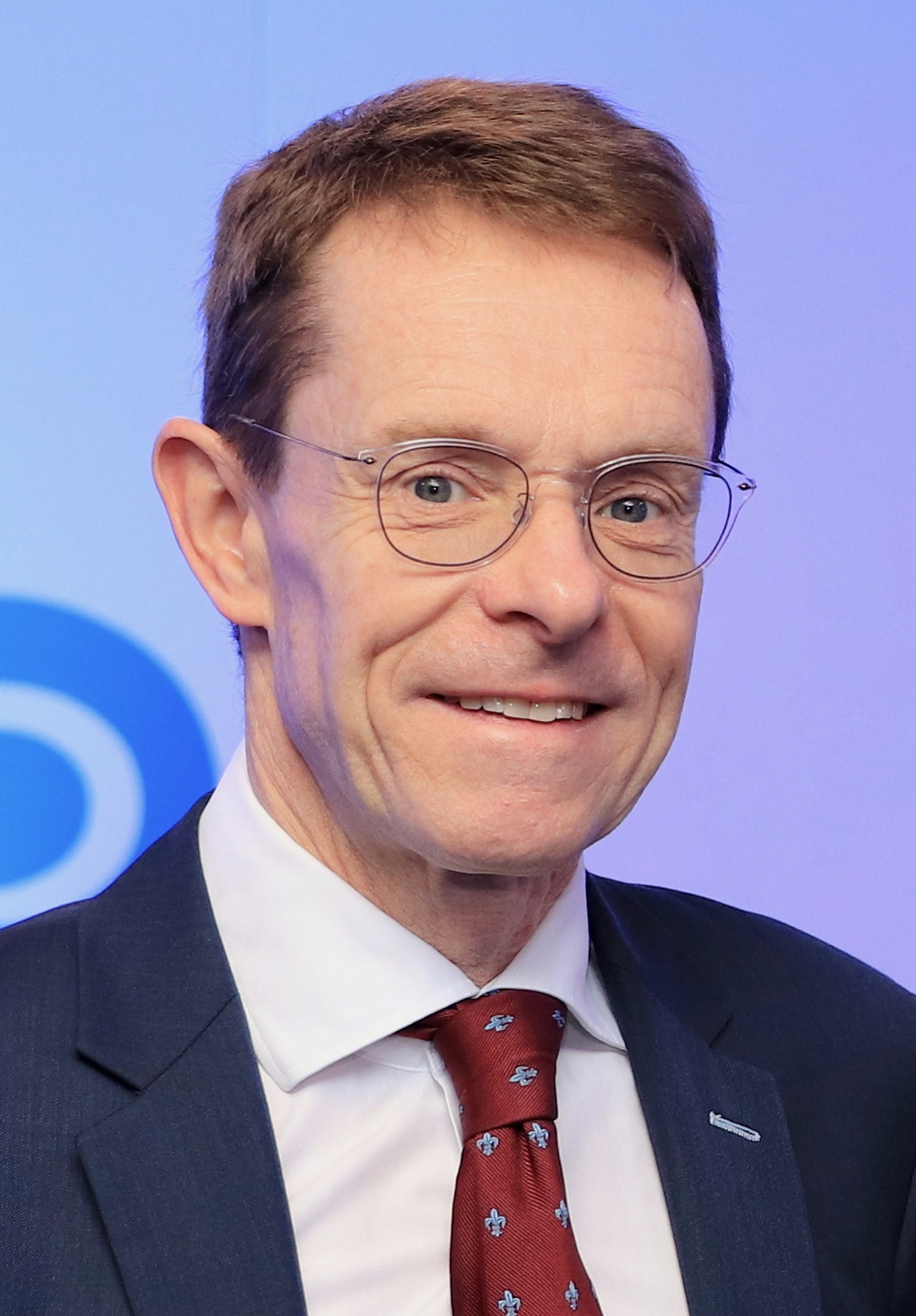
Andy Street

- 2016
  - There are 40 LGBT MPs in the Parliament of the United Kingdom, which in 2016 is the most in any parliament around the world.
  - Hannah Blythyn, Jeremy Miles, and Adam Price became the first openly gay members of the Welsh Assembly.
  - Carl Austin-Behan was sworn in as Manchester's first openly gay Lord Mayor.
  - Northern Ireland allow gay and bi men to donate blood after a 1-year deferral period.
  - Prince William became the first member of Britain's royal family to appear on the cover of a gay magazine when he appeared on the cover of the July issue of Attitude; in the cover story, he also became the first British royal to openly condemn the bullying of the gay community.
  - British Government minister Justine Greening revealed that she was in a same-sex relationship, thus becoming the first out LGB female cabinet minister.
  - Elle printed special collectors' covers for their September 2016 issue, and one of them featured Hari Nef, which was the first time an openly transgender woman had been on the cover of a major commercial British magazine.
  - The British women's field hockey team won gold at the Olympics; as Kate and Helen Richardson-Walsh were both on that team, this made them the first same-sex married couple to win Olympic medals.
  - Nicholas Chamberlain became the first bishop in the Church of England to come out as gay, which occurred following threats of an outing from an unnamed Sunday newspaper. He said he lived with his partner in a celibate same-sex relationship, as required by the Bishops' guidelines, under which gay clergy must practice abstinence and may not marry.
  - Ivar Mountbatten came out as gay and revealed that he was in a relationship with James Coyle, an airline cabin services director whom he met whilst at a ski resort in Verbier. While not being a member of the British royal family, he is the first member of the extended family to come out as gay.
  - Anwen Muston, a British Labour Party politician, was elected to Wolverhampton City Council at the 2016 elections; this makes her the first openly transgender woman to be elected as a Labour representative.
  - The Armed Forces Act 2016 finally repeals "homosexual acts as a grounds of discharge from the armed forces".
  - Same-sex marriage become legal on the Isle of Man, the first crown dependency to legalise same-sex marriage after the Marriage and Civil Partnership (Amendment) Act 2016 to effect on the 22 July.
- 2017
  - In April 2017, the Parliament of the United Kingdom passed the Merchant Shipping (Homosexual Conduct) Act 2017. This private member's bill was drafted by Conservative MP John Glen. It repealed sections 146(4) and 147(3) of the Criminal Justice and Public Order Act 1994, which was labelled as the UK's last anti-gay law. It went into effect immediately after royal assent.
  - The Policing and Crime Act pardoned all historic instances of criminal convictions of gross indecency against men in England and Wales, becoming commonly known as the Turing law after Alan Turing.
  - Andy Street became the United Kingdom's first openly gay, directly elected metro mayor.
  - Philippa York, came out as transgender, thus becoming the first former professional cyclist to have publicly transitioned; she had been one of Britain's most successful cyclists of all time.
  - British voters returned a record number of LGBTQ MPs to Parliament of the United Kingdom in the general election. Forty-five gay, lesbian or bi MPs were elected on Thursday 8 June, six more than in the previous parliament. The SNP registered the largest proportion of LGBTQ elected members in its parliamentary party, with seven of its 35 MPs identifying as such.
  - Ryan Atkin became the first openly gay official in English football.
  - Same-sex marriage become legal in Guernsey, on the 2 May.
- 2018
  - The Historical Sexual Offences (Pardons and Disregards) Act was passed in Scotland.
  - John Blair of the Alliance Party, became the first openly gay member of the Northern Ireland Assembly.
  - Lord Ivar Mountbatten married his same-sex partner, James Coyle, on 22 September 2018, becoming the first member of the British monarch's extended family to have a same-sex wedding.
  - Same-sex marriage becomes legal in Alderney on the 18th June, and in Jersey on 1st July.
- 2019
  - Laverne Cox was one of fifteen women chosen by guest editor Meghan, Duchess of Sussex to appear on the cover of the September 2019 issue of British Vogue; this made Cox the first openly transgender woman to appear on the cover of British Vogue.
  - Songs of Praise showed its first gay wedding, which was the wedding of Jamie Wallace and Ian McDowall at the Rutherglen United Reformed Church in Glasgow. Lucia Lucas became the first transgender singer to perform with the English National Opera in London.
  - Gayming Magazine, an online LGBTQ video gaming magazine is launched.
  - The international drag competition franchise RuPaul’s Drag Race launched its British edition on BBC Three.

=== 2020s ===
- 2020
  - UK MP Layla Moran revealed in an interview with PinkNews that she is pansexual; she is believed to be the first UK parliamentarian to come out as pansexual.
  - On 13 January same-sex marriage became legal in Northern Ireland.
  - In February, the first same-sex marriage took place in Northern Ireland.
  - Jan Morris, a notable transgender historian, author and journalist died.
  - The High Court of Justice ruled children under 16 are unlikely to be able to consent to hormone blocker treatment in the Bell v Tavistock case. This halted all referrals of under 18s from GID's for any form of treatment and any referrals to be made from 1 December 2020 had to go through court to be approved.
  - Levi Davis comes out as bisexual, making him the first professional rugby union player to come out as bisexual while still playing.
  - Sark become the last place in the British Isles to legalise same-sex marriage on 23rd April 2020.
- 2021
  - Adrian Hanstock was made the temporary Chief Constable of the British Transport Police, making him the first openly gay man to be chief of police of a British police force.
  - On the 23 June, the Bank of England released a new £50 banknote with Alan Turing, making the first banknote with an LGBT person on it.
  - Owen J Hurcum became the world's first non-binary mayor and Wales' youngest ever elected mayor of Bangor City Council in Gwynedd, Wales.
  - Queen Elizabeth II announces that a conversion therapy ban is to be brought forward to parliament in her 2021 Queen's Speech.
  - Blood donation laws changed to allow some men who have sex with men to donate.
  - The UK census in England and Wales includes voluntary questions on gender identity and sexual orientation for the first time, meaning that data can be gathered on the numbers of LGBT people across the country.
  - In September, judges overturned the Bell v Tavistock ruling and once again allowed trans people under 16 to consent to receiving puberty blockers.
- 2022
  - The UK government announced new proposals to pardon a wider group of people previously convicted of military or civilian crimes imposed on someone solely because of consensual same-sex sexual activity. The amendment would also allow those who have died prior to the amendment coming into force, and within a year after the change comes into force, to be posthumously pardoned.
  - Blackpool F.C.'s forward Jake Daniels came out as gay, making him the first active professional footballer to come out as LGBT+.
  - Queer Britain, the UK's first dedicated museum of LGBTQ history and culture opens in Kings Cross, London.
  - The Royal Mint celebrates 50 years of pride in the UK by releasing a commemorative 50p coin, marking the first time Britain's LGBT+ community has been celebrated on a UK coin.
  - The Gender Recognition Reform (Scotland) Bill is passed by the Scottish Parliament, awaiting royal assent. The bill amends the Gender Recognition Act 2004 of the Parliament of the United Kingdom, making it simpler for people to change their legal gender in Scotland.
- 2023
  - The Government of the United Kingdom uses section 35 of the Scotland Act 1998 to block the reform bill from receiving royal assent, the first ever use of section 35.
  - The Government of the United Kingdom extends the Disregards and Pardons scheme for historic same-sex offences to include women as eligible and widens the criteria for disregards and pardons.
  - The first reality dating show to be exclusively LGBT+, I Kissed a Boy, launches on BBC Three.
- 2024
  - In a January 2024 ruling, the High Court in London affirmed that the Gender Recognition Act 2004 only recognises binary genders, therefore the Gender Recognition Panel (GRP) cannot issue a certificate for a non-binary identity. The case, Castellucci v Gender Recognition Panel, established that the GRP had no power to recognise a non-binary gender. This decision means that under current UK law, non-binary individuals cannot obtain legal recognition of their non-binary identity through the GRP.
  - The Cass Review was released to the public, the findings of which led to a UK ban on prescribing puberty blockers to treat minors with gender dysphoria. The review was later heavily criticised for its ideological position and methodological flaws.
  - Prescribing of puberty blockers (GnRH analogues) to trans youth in the UK was banned temporarily, until the ban was made permanent under the 2024 Labour government.
  - Failure of conversion therapy ban: Six years after the first government pledge to ban conversion therapy, a private member's bill failed in March 2024 after MPs obstructed discussion. Following the July general election, the new Labour government committed to introducing a trans-inclusive ban on conversion practices.
  - Fertility law reform: Changes to fertility laws were announced to improve access for same-sex couples where one or both partners are HIV-positive. The new rules allow individuals with a non-transmittable viral load to donate eggs or sperm to known recipients, removing a previous barrier for many same-sex couples.
- 2025
  - The Supreme Court rules that the legal definition of a woman is based on biological sex, excluding trans women from being legally defined as a woman under the Equality Act.
  - British Transport Police announces that trans women arrested on Britain’s railways will in future be strip-searched by male officers “in accordance with the biological birth sex of the detainee”.
  - Maisie Trollette (David Raven), known as Britain's oldest working drag queen, died aged 91. Maisie Trollette performed for decades and was the subject of the documentary Maisie.
  - The EHRC released An interim update on the practical implications of the UK Supreme Court judgment advising that toilets and changing rooms provided by workplaces, services that are open to the public, sporting bodies, schools and associations, should be provided on the basis of ‘biological sex’ (i.e. sex assigned at birth), effectively excluding transgender people from using facilities that match their gender identities. Being only interim guidance, it was not required to be enforced though those providing single-sex services were still required to be acting in compliance with the 2010 Equality Act.
  - The Online Safety Act 2023 comes into force: designed to make it difficult for under 16s to access pornographic material but also having the effect of restricting some vital LGBTQ+ online resources (such as support and informational pages) from being accessed by those under 16.
  - The High Court ruled that Northumbria Police officers parading in uniform during Newcastle Pride was unlawful as it breaches the police’s impartiality. Later that year, North Yorkshire Police said it wouldn’t allow its officers to march in uniform during York Pride, citing the court case.
  - Throughout 2025, LGBTQ+ rights in the UK saw a notable decline, primarily affecting transgender individuals, which was reflected in the country's drop to 22nd place in ILGA-Europe's annual Rainbow Index.
  - A transgender woman was jailed for deception sex assault after being convicted of deceiving a heterosexual man into performing a sex act.
- 2026
  - In April, the Crime and Policing Bill received Royal Assent, changing the law to make anti-LGBTQ+ hate crime an aggravated offence. Although anti-LGBTQ+ hate crime had long been recognised in British law, offences motivated by race or religion historically carried stronger maximum penalties. Under the new legislation, the punishment for anti-LGBTQ+ hate crimes will be equalised.
  - In May, the first two transgender MSPs are elected to the Scottish Parliament.
  - In October, updated guidance from NHS England states that trans people should use hospital spaces according to biological sex.
  - In November, Scottish Prison Service deputy chief executive confirms that all transgender prisoners who identified as female were now held in men's prisons,complying with a judge's ruling in June that sex segregation in prisons must be based on biological sex rather than gender identity.

== See also ==
- Hall–Carpenter Archives the national archive of LGBT history
- History of human sexuality
- History of violence against LGBT people in the United Kingdom
- LGBTQ history
- LGBTQ rights in the United Kingdom
- List of LGBTQ art exhibitions in Britain
- Oscar Wilde
- Stonewall (charity)
- Table of years in LGBT rights
- Timeline of sexual orientation and medicine
