= LGBTQ rights in the Isle of Man =

- Location of the Isle of Man (red) in the British Isles (red & grey)
- Legal status: Legal since 1992, age of consent equal since 2006
- Gender identity: Right to change legal gender since 2009
- Discrimination protections: Sexual orientation and "gender reassignment" protections (see below)

Family rights
- Recognition of relationships: Civil partnerships since 2011; Same-sex marriage since 2016
- Adoption: Full adoption rights since 2011

Lesbian, gay, bisexual, transgender, and queer (LGBTQ) rights in the British Crown dependency of the Isle of Man have evolved substantially since the early 2000s. Private and consensual acts of male homosexuality on the island were decriminalised in 1992. LGBTQ rights have been extended and recognised in law since then, such as an equal age of consent (2006), employment protection from discrimination (2006), gender identity recognition (2009), the right to enter into a civil partnership (2011), the right to adopt children (2011) and the right to enter into a civil marriage (2016).

While not part of the United Kingdom, the Isle of Man has also followed the UK's example in incorporating the European Convention on Human Rights into its own laws through the Human Rights Act 2001. In January 2023, it was reported that the Isle of Man "is the most LGBTQ legislative policy friendly place" in the world. In 2024, it became the first British territory and the first part of the British Isles to ban conversion therapy.

== Law regarding same-sex sexual activity ==
Prior to September 1992, same-sex sexual activity was a criminal offence. After decriminalisation, the age of consent was set at 21, which at that time was the same age as in the United Kingdom. In 2001, the age of consent for male homosexuals was lowered to eighteen by the Criminal Justice Act 2001 (c.4). In 2006, by the Sexual Offences (Amendment) Act 2006 (c.3), the age of consent was lowered again to sixteen, becoming gender-neutral for all sexual conduct, regardless of gender and sexual orientation.

Until 2021, Section 9 of the Sexual Offences Act 1992 continued to apply the criminal law to some "unnatural offences" between men. Sub-sections (1) and (4) made "buggery" and "gross indecency" between men offences if one or both of the parties is under sixteen and also if the acts were committed "elsewhere than in private." The meaning of this was defined in Section 10: not in private meant that "more than two persons are present" or that the location is "any place to which the public have or are permitted to have access, whether on payment or otherwise." In 2021, the "more than two persons are present" specification was deleted, and the language prohibiting "indecent exposure" and "sexual activity in a public place" was made gender-neutral.

=== Pardon scheme law ===
In July 2021, the Sexual Offences and Obscene Publications Act 2021 passed into law with royal assent. The legislation went into legal effect formally a year later since July 1, 2022 by proclamation. This law will pardon historical gay sex offences committed prior to 1992 and is explicitly based on the UK's Alan Turing law of 2017. "A ban on sexual orientation and gender identity conversion therapy" was passed into law in 2020 as an amendment added to the very extensive sexual offences bill in the Legislative Council. This came into effect in 2024.

=== Unqualified apology ===
The Isle of Man's Chief Minister Howard Quayle has issued an "unqualified apology" to gay men convicted of same-sex offences under previous Manx laws. He made the comments as a bill, which will see men convicted of consensual homosexual offences pardoned, had its final reading in the House of Keys. Mr Quayle said he could not erase "past injustice" but hoped new legislation would "start to heal some of the pain". Gay rights campaigner Alan Shea said it was a "great day for the Isle of Man". "The families that have lost children have just received an apology. Maybe now we can all heal, but parents will never forget their children," he said. Homosexual acts were decriminalised on the Isle of Man in 1992, 25 years later than in England and Wales, and 12 years after Scotland. In August 2022, on the 30th anniversary of homosexuality being decriminalised, the police commissioner on the Isle of Man also formally apologised for enforcement of the anti-gay laws up until 1992.

== Recognition of same-sex relationships ==
Same-sex unions can be recognised through civil partnerships or marriage. The Isle of Man Parliament legalised civil partnerships in April 2011 and same-sex marriages in July 2016.

=== Civil partnerships ===
Since 2011, same-sex couples have been provided with civil partnerships. A civil partnership bill passed all stages of both the House of Keys and the Legislative Council and was signed into law on 15 March 2011. The Civil Partnership Act 2011 (c. 2) took effect on 6 April 2011. It was decided in 2014 that same-sex marriages from England, Wales and Scotland as well as other relationships performed abroad would be treated as civil partnerships on the island, until same-sex marriage is legalised.

=== Same-sex marriage ===
On 9 June 2015, Chief Minister Allan Bell announced his intention to repeal the law barring same-sex marriage on the island. Following public consultation on the issue, a bill to legalise same-sex marriage in the Isle was introduced to House of Keys on 2 February 2016. A public consultation and government response was concluded by 22 January 2016, and the bill passed its third reading in the House on 8 March by a vote of 17–3. Following a number of technical amendments at the clauses stage, the bill passed its third reading in the Legislative Council on 26 April 2016 by a vote of 6–3. The House of Keys unanimously approved the amendments to the bill on 10 May, and royal assent was granted on 19 July 2016. The law went into effect on 22 July 2016. Lee Clarke-Vorster has been noted in Hansard as main campaigner for the same-sex marriage bill.

The first same-sex marriage to be registered on the Isle of Man was that of Marc and Alan Steffan-Cowell, who converted their civil partnership into a marriage on 25 July 2016. The first same-sex marriage to be performed on the island occurred on 30 July, between Luke Carine and Zak Tomlinson.

Since November 2023, certain churches have applied for marriage licences so they can legally perform same-sex marriage on the Isle of Man.

== Adoption and family planning ==
By the Civil Partnership Act 2011 (c. 2), same-sex couples in the Isle of Man have been granted equal access to full joint or stepchild adoption since 6 April 2011.

Additionally, lesbian couples have access to artificial insemination. In August 2023, "community consultation" commenced to legally recognise same-sex couples as parents - just like the UK implemented since 2008. Currently on the Isle of Man same-sex couples are not recognised as parents on birth certificates from IVF and surrogacy, despite IVF access being available. No laws on the Isle of Man acknowledge surrogacy.

== Discrimination protections ==
Under the Employment Act 2006 (c. 21), which took effect on 1 September 2006, the Isle of Man adopted legislation which made it unlawful to dismiss employees on the grounds of their sexual orientation. At the time, LGBTQ reports from the Isle of Man stated that the island's Government was "falling behind".

In 2013, after a highly publicised case on the island involving a lesbian couple who were not allowed to rent a house by a church leader, Chief Minister Alan Bell announced that legislation to outlaw all forms of discrimination in goods and services would be introduced. A draft bill, based on the British Equality Act 2010, would replace all existing anti-discrimination laws into one piece of legislation. Consultation on the bill ended in November 2014. In August 2015, the Government published its response to the consultation. The measure had its first reading in the 11-member Legislative Council on 8 March 2016. The bill passed its second reading by a vote of 6-3 on 22 March. 12 amendments to the bill were proposed within the clauses stage and all passed. The bill passed its third reading by a vote of 5-4 on 14 June 2016. The legislation was approved by the House of Keys on 7 March 2017, with amendments. On 28 March, the Legislative Council concurred with the amendments. Royal assent was granted on 18 July 2017. The Equality Act 2017 was phased in, with much of the law having come into force on 1 January 2019.

The Equality Act 2017 (Manx: Slattys Cormid 2017) lists age, disability, gender reassignment, marriage and civil partnership, pregnancy and maternity, race, religion or belief, sex, and sexual orientation as protected characteristics and grounds of non-discrimination. Sexual orientation is defined as "a person's inherent romantic or sexual attraction towards persons of the same sex, persons of the opposite sex, or persons of either sex". In addition, "not being romantically or sexually attracted to persons of either sex is also a sexual orientation".

== Hate crime legislation ==
In July 2022, community consultation progressed that would soon introduce a hate crime bill within the Isle of Man - that explicitly includes "sexual orientation, marital or civil partnership status and gender reassignment".

== Gender identity and expression ==
Transgender persons are allowed to change their legal gender and to have their new gender recognised as a result of the Gender Recognition Act 2009 (c.11).

== Blood donation policy ==
In August 2022, it was reported by the BBC that the Isle of Man government would formally reform the blood donation policy by introducing a bill, that would legally allow monogamous gay and bi men to donate blood - to be inline with the UK by early 2023. A review of blood donation policies was conducted back in 2014 on the Isle of Man, however no action was taken. Since 1 June 2023, monogamous gay and bi men can donate blood - non-monogamous individuals who have anal sex regardless of sexuality are banned from donating blood for periods of three months after their last sexual contact.

== Summary table ==
Same-sex sexual activity legal	Yes (Since 1992)
Equal age of consent (16)	Yes (Since 2006)
Gay sex criminal offences expungement or pardon scheme	Yes (Since 2022)
Anti-discrimination laws in employment	Yes (Since 2006)
Anti-discrimination laws in the provision of goods and services	Yes (Since 2019)
Anti-discrimination laws in all other areas (incl. indirect discrimination, hate speech)	Yes (Since 2019)
Anti-discrimination laws concerning gender identity	Yes / No (Since 2019 - Equality Act 2017 only refers to "gender reassignment" and "transgender person")
Recognition of same-sex couples	Yes (Since 2011)
Same-sex marriages	Yes (Since 2016)
Stepchild adoption by same-sex couples	Yes (Since 2011)
Joint adoption by same-sex couples	No (Since 2011)
LGBT people allowed to serve openly in the military	Yes (Since 2000)
Right to change legal gender	Yes (Since 2009)
Gender self-identification	No
Legal recognition of non-binary gender	No
Access to IVF for lesbian couples	Yes (Since 2009)
Commercial surrogacy for gay male couples	No (Banned for heterosexual couples as well)
MSMs allowed to donate blood	Yes (Since 2023)
Legal recognition of intersex people	No
Intersex human rights	No

== See also ==
- Politics of the Isle of Man
- Human rights in the Isle of Man
- Same-sex marriage in the Isle of Man
- LGBTQ rights in the United Kingdom
- LGBTQ rights in Europe
