= Public Morality Council =

Organisation founded in London in 1899

The Public Morality Council (PMC) was a moral reform organisation founded in London in 1899 by the Bishop of London. Originally the London Council for the Promotion of Public Morality, it changed its name by 1904 and became known for campaigning against vice and indecency, especially in the public entertainment industry and news media.

By the middle of the 20th century, it had become a major pressure group in Britain, with ecumenical backing from Christian and Jewish leaders. It monitored theatre, film, radio, and television for material it considered immoral. Its work was part of a broader social purity tradition that sought to regulate public behaviour through moral advocacy.

== History ==
This organisation, founded in 1899 by the Anglican Bishop of London, became a powerful moral vigilante group from 1945 to 1965.

Despite its Anglican origins, The PMC had an ecumenical governance involving Christian and Jewish leaders who channeled morality complaints for investigation. It conducted surveillance, both overt and covert, on theatre plays, shows, films, radio, and television programmes. The group also numbered among its members, representatives from education, medicine and charitable organisations.

Led for many years by Methodist preacher George Tomlinson, the PMC wielded significant sway over regulators like the Lord Chamberlain, British Board of Film Censors, Home Office, and London County Council, as well as industry bodies such as theatre owners and filmmakers. Licensing for cinemas, theatres and other places of entertainment at the time was the responsibility of individual local authorities in the UK, and not of national government.

In May 1950 the PMC formally asked the British Board of Film Censors (BBFC) to have American film scripts vetted before production, arguing this would prevent harmful material being produced, especially for the young and impressionable.

=== Demise ===
The demise of the Public Morality Council began with a sudden organisational collapse triggered by the illness and, six months later, the death of its long serving secretary, George Tomlinson, in 1964, which exposed how dependent the whole structure had been on one man. Without Tomlinson, subcommittee work stalled, correspondence went unanswered, and the finances were found to be chaotic, a situation that had been concealed. The PMC had been running an annual deficit after legacies and income dried up. There had been no proper audit for several years .

Tomlinson was succeeded by Edward Oliver, appointed as the new secretary in 1965. Oliver undertook a deliberate dismantling of traditional vigilance work. Oliver was a Catholic layman with prior experience in the London Committee Against Obscenity. After delaying taking up his post, he met each subcommittee only once, argued for new legal advice before any campaign and refusing routine correspondence. He announced a constitution revising body set up without consulting existing members. He repeatedly cancelled and postponed meetings, effectively ending the vigilance work. Publicly, Oliver told the Catholic Herald that the PMC stood for something "small, narrow minded, old womanish," obsessed with sexual promiscuity. He rebranded the organisation as the Social Morality Council (SMC), focussing on society, rather than sex. Oliver also sought to wrest the body from Anglican control into a more ecumenical but effectively Catholic led organisation.

By 1966 the reconstituted SMC's first Anglican chair, Stephan Hopkinson, publicly criticised the old PMC's obsession with gradations of nudity and dirty postcards. Meanwhile, non establishment individuals, such as Mary Whitehouse, perceived a “crumpling of ecclesiastical moral vigilance” and stepped into the vacuum with her Clean up Television campaign.

== Bibliography ==
- Aldgate, Anthony (1995). Censorship and the Permissive Society: British Cinema and Theatre 1955–1965. Oxford: Clarendon Press.
- Barber, Sarah (2024). "'Lewd, pornographic filth': Managing culture through local film censorship in Britain 1948–1968". Journal of British Cinema and Television. 21 (1): 53–74. doi:10.3366/jbctv.2024.0699.
- Bland, Lucy (1992). "'Purifying' the public world: Feminist vigilantes in late Victorian England". Women's History Review. 1 (3): 397–412. doi:10.1080/09612029200200013.
- Brown, Callum G. (17 October 2019). The Battle for Christian Britain: Sex, Humanists and Secularisation, 1945–1980. Cambridge University Press. ISBN 978-1-108-42122-5.
- Hendy, David (2006). "Bad Language and BBC Radio Four in the 1960s and 1970s". Twentieth Century British History. 17 (1): 74–102. doi:10.1093/tcbh/hwi065.
- Hilliard, Christopher (2021). A Matter of Obscenity: The Politics of Censorship in Modern England. Princeton: Princeton University Press.
- Kuhn, Annette (2002). "Children, 'Horrific' Films, and Censorship in 1930s Britain". Historical Journal of Film, Radio and Television. 22 (2): 197–202. doi:10.1080/01439680220133792.
- Nicholson, Steve (2003–2015). The Censorship of British Drama, 1900–1968. Vol. 4 vols. Exeter: University of Exeter Press.
- Nicholson, Steve (2016). "Theatre Censorship in Britain (1909–1968)". In Martin, Laurent (ed.). Les censures dans le monde, XIXe–XXIe siècle (in French). Rennes: Presses universitaires de Rennes. pp. 109–118.
