= Alan Turing law =

2017 British law pardoning formerly illegal sex acts

"Alan Turing law" is an informal term for the portion of the Policing and Crime Act 2017 which serves to pardon men who were cautioned or convicted under obsolete laws criminalising homosexual acts. The provision is named after Alan Turing, the World War II codebreaker and computing pioneer, who was convicted of gross indecency in 1952. Turing received a royal pardon posthumously in 2013. The law applies to convictions in England and Wales (including military offences, which are tried under English law) and Northern Ireland. A similar law, the Historical Sexual Offences (Pardons and Disregards) (Scotland) Act 2018, was later passed by the Scottish Parliament.

Several proposals had been put forward for an Alan Turing law, and introducing such a law was government policy since 2015. To implement the pardon, the British Government announced on 20 October 2016 that it would support an amendment to the Policing and Crime Bill that would provide a posthumous pardon, and provide a process whereby those still living could apply to have these offences disregarded. A rival bill to implement the Alan Turing law, in second reading at the time of the government announcement, was filibustered. The bill received royal assent on 31 January 2017, and the pardon was implemented that same day. The law provides pardons only for men convicted of acts that are no longer offences; those convicted under the same laws of offences that were still crimes on the date the law went into effect, such as cottaging, underage sex, or rape, were not pardoned.

Manchester Withington MP John Leech, often described as 'the architect' of the Alan Turing Law, led a high-profile campaign to pardon Turing and submitted several bills to parliament, leading to the eventual posthumous pardon.

== Background ==
Alan Turing, whose 2013 pardon was the impetus for a general pardon

All homosexual acts between men were illegal until the passing of the Sexual Offences Act 1967 in England and Wales, the Criminal Justice Act 1980 in Scotland, and the Homosexual Offences Order 1982 in Northern Ireland. As the three regions are separate jurisdictions, and many elements of criminal law are devolved matters in the United Kingdom, the British Government, by convention, only legislated a pardon for England and Wales.

Alan Turing, after whom the proposed law has been informally named, was a mathematician, codebreaker and founding father of computer science who died in 1954 by suicide, following his conviction for gross indecency in 1952 in which he was sentenced to chemical castration. A campaign to pardon Turing was led by former Manchester Withington MP John Leech, who called it "utterly disgusting and ultimately just embarrassing" that the conviction was upheld as long as it was. Turing himself was pardoned posthumously through the royal prerogative of mercy under David Cameron in 2013, but contrary to the requests of some campaigners including Leech, the Astronomer Royal Martin Rees and the activist and journalist Peter Tatchell, his pardon was not immediately followed by pardons for anyone else convicted. Leech submitted several motions and campaigned for half a decade as an MP for a more general pardon and continued to do so after losing his seat in the 2015 general election.

== Proposals ==
The Protection of Freedoms Act 2012 proposed by David Cameron introduced the disregard procedure, under which men with an offence of "gross indecency between men" on their criminal record could petition to have these offences disregarded during criminal record checks by courts and employers, but fell short of an actual pardon.

While in opposition, the Labour Party under Ed Miliband announced that it would introduce an Alan Turing law if elected at the 2015 general election. The Conservative Party under Cameron subsequently announced the same policy. When Theresa May became Prime Minister following the resignation of David Cameron, she also announced that her government would support the Alan Turing law.

== Rival bills ==
In June 2016, John Nicolson MP introduced a Private Member's Bill, the Sexual Offences (Pardons Etc.) Bill 2016–17, intended to implement the proposal. In October 2016, the Conservative government announced that, instead of supporting the Private Member's Bill's original proposal for a blanket pardon for all, it would enact the proposed changes through an amendment to the forthcoming Policing and Crime Bill 2016. This amendment would provide a posthumous pardon for the dead, make it easier for living individuals to clear their names, and also provide an automatic formal pardon for living people who had had such offences removed from their record through the disregard process. When Nicolson's bill was debated in Parliament on 21 October 2016, it was successfully filibustered by Conservative MP Sam Gyimah and failed to proceed.

The two differed in the process for dealing with cases where the conviction was for an act that would still be considered an offence under current law. Both attempted to exclude these, but Nicolson's bill provided an automatic pardon while the government bill required the petitioner to go through the "disregard process" first. This would mean that the Home Office will investigate each case involving living people to ensure that the act that the petitioner was convicted of is no longer considered a criminal act, to avoid pardoning men convicted of underage sex or rape. More controversially, this means that it would also not pardon men who were arrested in public toilets, as they would today be guilty of the offence of "sexual activity in a public lavatory". The government claimed that without this check, men who were convicted of such an offence would be able to claim that they had been pardoned. Nicolson disagreed and, backed by the LGBT campaign group Stonewall, said that the government was attempting to "hijack" the law by announcing the amendment just prior to the second reading of his Private Member's Bill, and said that his bill already excluded cases where the offence was still considered a crime. The Nicholson bill would not have been able to clear criminal records of men who still carried convictions. This would still have to be done through the disregard process, leading to possible cases in which it would not be clear whether or not a pardon had been granted, described by James Chalmers, Regius Professor of Law at the University of Glasgow, as a "Schrödinger's pardon".

On 19 October 2016, Liberal Baron Sharkey, with government support, had added the core amendment to the agenda for the Policing and Crime Bill 2016. The proposed pardon process, like the disregard process in the Protection of Freedoms Act 2012 as passed, applied only to England and Wales. Groups in Northern Ireland and Scotland campaigned for equivalent laws in their jurisdictions. In the Lords committee stage debate on 9 November, Sharkey's amendment was accepted, while a proposal by Lord Lexden to extend the disregard and pardon processes to Northern Ireland was deferred by Baroness Williams, to see if the Northern Ireland Assembly would agree to the necessary legislative consent motion. The assembly consented on 28 November, and Lexden's proposal was accepted at Lords report stage on 12 December, along with one from Michael Cashman extending the power of disregard and pardon to further offences. The Commons agreed to the relevant Lords amendments on 10 January 2017 and the bill received royal assent on 31 January 2017 as the Policing and Crime Act 2017.

The Turing law provisions came into force immediately in England and Wales, and on 28 June 2018 in Northern Ireland. The provisions were not extended to Scotland because the Scottish government was planning a similar measure, which became the Historical Sexual Offences (Pardons and Disregards) (Scotland) Act 2018.

== Reaction ==
The announcement was broadly welcomed, but some quarters said it did not go far enough. The campaigner George Montague said that he would refuse a pardon, as a pardon suggested that he was guilty of a crime, and instead asked for a government apology. Peter Tatchell welcomed the law but noted "a few omissions. It does not explicitly allow for the pardoning of men convicted of soliciting and procuring homosexual relations under the 1956 and 1967 Sexual Offences Acts. Nor does it pardon those people, including some lesbians, convicted for same-sex kissing and cuddling under laws such as the Public Order Act 1986, the common law offence of outraging public decency, the Town Police Clauses Act 1847, the Ecclesiastical Courts Jurisdiction Act 1860, ... and other diverse statutes".

Matt Houlbrook, Professor of Cultural History at the University of Birmingham, said that the announcement was of both "symbolic and practical importance" to gay men still living with the offences on their criminal record, but noted that using Alan Turing as a figurehead retroactively gave him an identity as a "gay martyr" that he never sought in life. James Chalmers, Regius Professor of Law at the University of Glasgow, noted that the disregard process had already provided an effective pardon, and neither implementation of the Alan Turing law would be able to pardon people who had committed acts that, although technically still criminal, are not usually prosecuted (such as sex between a 16-year-old and a 15-year-old or sex in certain public places).

As of January 2017, some 49,000 men had been posthumously pardoned under the terms of the Policing and Crime Act 2017.

== See also ==
- Decriminalization of homosexuality
- Pardon of victims of Paragraph 175 (Germany)
- Timeline of LGBT history in the United Kingdom
