= The Mothers (play) =

One-act play by Edith Ellis

- Original language: English
- Written by: Edith Ellis
- Setting: Cornwall

Premiere
- Date: 1915

The Mothers is a 1915 one-act written by the English women's rights activist Edith Ellis and is set in Cornwall. The play premiered at the Little Theatre in Chicago and it is one of only three plays that she has written. It is the first British play that clearly features female homoeroticism.

Jill Davis, in a 1991 article published in Women: A Cultural Review, stated that it is the earliest play that she has come across that has a lesbian representation of a lesbian experience.
