= Human rights in the Isle of Man =

The Isle of Man is a Crown Dependency located in the Irish Sea between the islands of Great Britain and Ireland with a population in 2015 estimated to be approximately 88,000. It enjoys a high degree of domestic, legislative and political autonomy through its ancient Parliament Tynwald. By convention, the United Kingdom Government is responsible for the conduct of the international relations and defence of the island. The Isle of Man does not have a written constitution, or a Bill of Rights which sets out its Human Rights. These rights are addressed in the Human Rights Act 2001. The island has also ratified a number of international treaties.

== Legal framework ==
=== International treaties ===
The Isle of Man has ratified six of the nine core human rights treaties. Namely the:

- International Convention on the Elimination of All Forms of Racial Discrimination (CERD)
- International Covenant on Civil and Political Rights (ICCPR)
- International Covenant on Economic, Social and Cultural Rights (ICESCR)
- Convention on the Elimination of All Forms of Discrimination against Women (CEDAW)
- Convention on the Rights of the Child (CRC)
- Convention against Torture and Other Cruel, Inhuman or Degrading Treatment or Punishment (UNCAT)

As a Crown Dependency, The United Kingdom (UK) is responsible for the international relations for the Isle of Man. The Isle of Man is not subject to the Universal Periodic Review (UPR) process as it is not a member state of the United Nations. However, in its reports on the UK, the UPR often gives recommendations to the UK to urge its overseas territories to implement its recommendations. The Isle of Man has agreed to some UPR recommendations such as ratifying the Optional Protocol on the Convention against Torture in 2014.

=== European Convention on Human Rights ===
The European Convention on Human Rights (ECHR) was ratified by the UK in 1951 and in 1953; the UK extended the Convention to the Isle of Man. The ECHR was used in the Isle of Man to protect its citizen’s human rights and fundamental freedoms. The ECHR established the European Court of Human Rights, where any individual who feels his or her rights have been violated under the Convention can take their case to the Court. The judgements of the Court are binding on the States concerned. The Convention extends fundamental human rights to individuals such as the right to life, the right to a fair trial and freedom of expression.

=== Human Rights Act 2001 ===
The Human Rights Act was passed by Tynwald in 2001 and came fully into force on 1 November 2006. This Act is similar in many respects to the UK Human Rights Act. The Act incorporates the fundamental rights and freedoms set out in the ECHR into its domestic law. Previously, an Isle of Man resident who believed that their rights had been violated had to go to the Court of Human Rights in Strasbourg, France to have their case heard. This process could be long and expensive and so the Government decided that the public should be able to guarantee their rights on the Isle of Man.

The Human Rights Act ensures that all public authorities act in a way which is compliant with the main articles of the ECHR. The rights enshrined within the Act are designed to protect the individual against any abuses by the State. They are not designed to settle disputes between individuals. If the Act cannot be interpreted in a way which complies with the Convention, a declaration of incompatibility can be made. This is a sign to Tynwald that the law should be changed, but there is no obligation for Tynwald to do so. If Tynwald do not amend the law, then the applicant can take their case to the ECHR.

== Human rights issues ==
=== Right to life ===
Under pressure from the UK government, and to meet ECHR requirements, the death penalty was abolished in 1993 on the Isle of Man; however the last execution had not taken place since 1872. The Isle of Man was the last place in the British Isles to formally abolish the death penalty.

=== Electoral rights ===
The House of Keys has 24 members, elected for a five-year term. The Isle of Man lowered its voting age from 18 to 16 in 2006. The Isle of Man became the first action for women’s suffrage by granting women who owned property the right to vote in 1881.

=== Employment rights ===
The Employment Act 2006 sets out a number of employee and employer rights on the Isle of Man such as the right to a minimum wage, the right to a minimum period of notice and unfair dismissals. Pursuant to the Miniumum Wage Act 2001, the Isle of Man has a minimum wage committee who determine different minimum wage amounts depending on the age of the employee.

=== Access to justice ===
Article 6 of the Human Rights Act states that everyone is entitled to the right to a fair trial. There has been concern that the current human rights structures on the Isle of Man do not sufficiently represent the deaf population as the island does not have appropriately qualified persons to assist deaf individuals in arrests and trials which has resulted in questions about the legitimacy of legal outcomes. In 2014, the Legal Aid Committee implemented a fundamental review of the island’s legal aid system to determine the future shape of access to justice for those who do not have the means to pay for it. Committee chairman Andrew Swithinbank stated: "The focus of the committee is to promote access to justice in a manner which is fair, equitable, transparent and professional and which uses public resources carefully and effectively."

=== Rights of persons with disabilities ===
The Disability Discrimination Act 2006 was given royal assent in October 2006 after it was approved by the branches of Tynwald. This Act was designed to demand minimum levels of accessibility for disabled people to buildings and prevent discrimination against disabled people in the supply of goods and services. The Act however, still remains to be implemented. In May 2011, the then chief minister Tony Brown stated “the Disability Discrimination Act is recognised as an important piece of legislation, however before the act is brought into effect a programme of assessment, education and improvements must take place.” The House of Keys has repeatedly failed to give a deadline for when the Act will be implemented.

=== LGBT rights ===
In April 2016 the Isle of Man approved The Marriage and Civil Partnership (Amendment) Bill legalizing same-sex marriage. Same-sex couples have been allowed to enter civil partnerships, but not marriage, since April 2011.

Since the early 1990s, the Isle of Man has relaxed its position with regards to lesbian, gay, bisexual and transgender (LGBT) rights. Prior to 1992, same-sex sexual activity was a criminal offence. Post de-criminalisation, the age of consent was set at 21 and then reduced to 18 by the Criminal Justice Act 2001. In 2006 s4(a) of the Sexual Offences (Amendment) Act 2006 further lowered the minimum age for homosexual acts to 16, thus aligning it with the same age of consent for heterosexual acts. They have also been given more rights with regard to employment protection from discrimination (2006), gender recognition (2009), the right to enter into civil partnerships and the right to adopt children (2011). However, it continues to apply special legal regulation to adult male homosexual sex.

Section 9 of the Sexual Offences Act 1992 contains a number of provisions which criminalise certain “unnatural offences” between men. Sections 9(1) and 9(4) respectively criminalise ‘buggery’ and ‘gross indecency’ between men if one party is under the age of sixteen or if the acts are committed “elsewhere than in private.” Section 10(1) provides buggery and gross indecency will not be considered to be in private if “more than two persons are present” or if the act is done in “any place to which the public have or are permitted to have access to, whether on payment or otherwise.”

In 2013 a local Independent Methodist minister refused to rent a house to two women because they were in a same sex relationship, causing international outrage. However, due to the Isle of Man’s failure to bring in an Equality Act, the discrimination was legal. An Equality Bill, based upon the UK Equality Act 2010 to update the island’s discrimination laws was swiftly put into drafting process. In early 2017 both houses of Tynwald passed the equality bill with many amendments. In July, 2017 the Equality Bill became the Equality Act after royal assent and will go into effect from July 2019.

=== Corporal punishment ===
Birching was a form of corporal punishment used on the Isle of Man during the 1960s and 1970s. It was principally the form of punishment for boys under 15 convicted of stealing, however was altered in 1960 so that birching could be used on males up to 21 years of age. In 1972 the case of Tyrer v the United Kingdom went to Human Rights Court. By a majority of six votes to one, the Court held Tyrer's birching to constitute degrading treatment contrary to the Article 3 of the ECHR. This was labelled a landmark decision by Manfred Nowak, UN Special Rapporteur on torture and other cruel, inhuman or degrading treatment or punishment. It wasn't until 1993 that birching was formally repealed in the Isle of Man.

Under Article 1 of the Children and Young Persons Act 1966, parents have the right to administer “reasonable chastisement” to children. The Global Initiative to end all corporal punishment of children prepared a report in 2013 suggesting the Isle of Man repeal a number of statutes relating to corporal punishment of children by all persons with authority over children. This included persons in day care centres, schools and penal institutions. However, the Isle of Man has been reluctant to do so, declining to implement UPR recommendations to the UK in both 2008 and 2013 for it to ban corporal punishment on children in its overseas territories. The Isle of Man stated that it does not see the need for reform as it believes the current law is working well and that parents should be allowed to discipline children.
