= Historical Sexual Offences (Pardons and Disregards) (Scotland) Act 2018 =

Act of Parliament of the United Kingdom

- Act of the Scottish Parliament
- Scottish Parliament
- Long title: An Act of the Scottish Parliament to pardon persons convicted of certain historical sexual offences and to provide a process for convictions for those offences to be disregarded.
- Citation: 2018 asp 14
- Introduced by: Michael Matheson, Cabinet Secretary for Justice

Dates
- Royal assent: 11 July 2018

Status: Current legislation

History of passage through the Parliament

Text of statute as originally enacted

Text of the Historical Sexual Offences (Pardons and Disregards) (Scotland) Act 2018 as in force today (including any amendments) within the United Kingdom, from legislation.gov.uk.

The Historical Sexual Offences (Pardons and Disregards) (Scotland) Act 2018 (asp 14) is an act of the Scottish Parliament.

== Provisions ==
It retroactively pardons men convicted of sexual offences under obsolete sodomy laws now repealed in Scotland. It came into effect in 2019. Men convicted of these historical offences will now receive an automatic formal pardon on application.

== Receptions ==
The legislation was supported by the Labour Party, whose spokesperson, Daniel Johnson, described it as "an important step on the road to undoing the wrongs of history and building a more equal society". The Liberal Democrat spokesperson described it as striking down "one of the last remnants of a more prejudiced era".

== See also ==
- Alan Turing law
