= Edith Ellis =

English writer and women's rights activist (1861–1916)

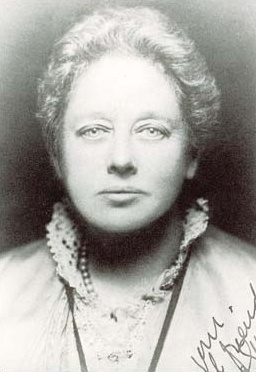
- Ellis in 1914
- Born: Edith Mary Oldham Lees; 9 March 1861; Newton, Lancashire, England
- Died: 14 September 1916 (aged 55); Paddington, London, England
- Spouse: Havelock Ellis (m. 1891)

Edith Mary Oldham Ellis (née Lees; 9 March 1861 – 14 September 1916) was an English writer and women's rights activist. She was married to the early sexologist Havelock Ellis.

== Biography ==
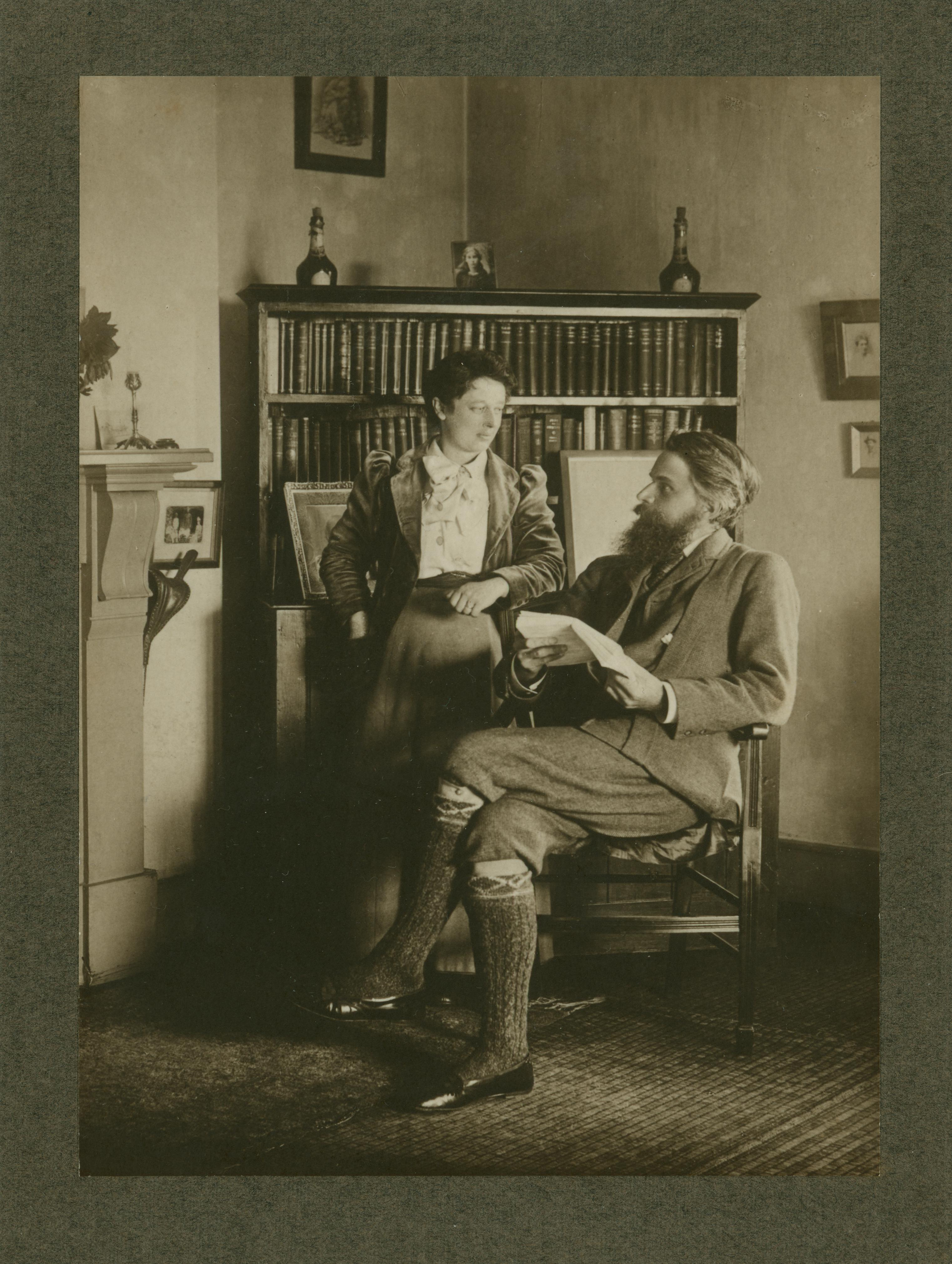
Edith Lees & Havelock Ellis

Ellis was born on 9 March 1861 in Newton, Lancashire. She was the only child of Samuel Oldham Lees, a landowner, and his wife Mary Laetitia, née Bancroft. She was born prematurely after her mother sustained a head injury during pregnancy and died when Ellis was an infant. In December 1868, her father married Margaret Ann (Minnie) Faulkner and in time she had a younger half-brother. She did not get on well with her father or his new wife. She was educated at a convent school in 1873 until her father realised that she was taking a strong interest in the Catholic faith. She was removed from the school and sent to another.

She joined the Fellowship of the New Life and she briefly worked with Ramsay MacDonald when they both served as secretaries to the Fellowship. She met Havelock Ellis at a meeting in 1887. The couple married in November 1891.

From the beginning, their marriage was unconventional; she was a lesbian and had romantic relationships with women, which her husband was aware of. Their open marriage was the central subject in Havelock Ellis's autobiography, My Life (1939).

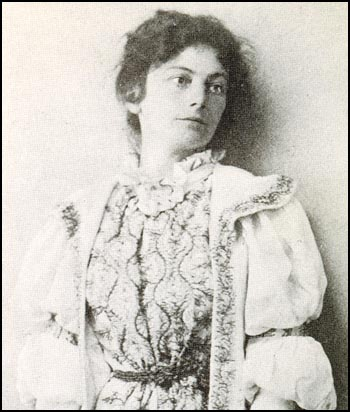
Lily Kirkpatrick, 1902

Her first novel, Seaweed: A Cornish Idyll, was published in 1898. Around this time Edith began a relationship with Lily Kirkpatrick, an Irish artist based in St Ives; Kirkpatrick died in June 1903.

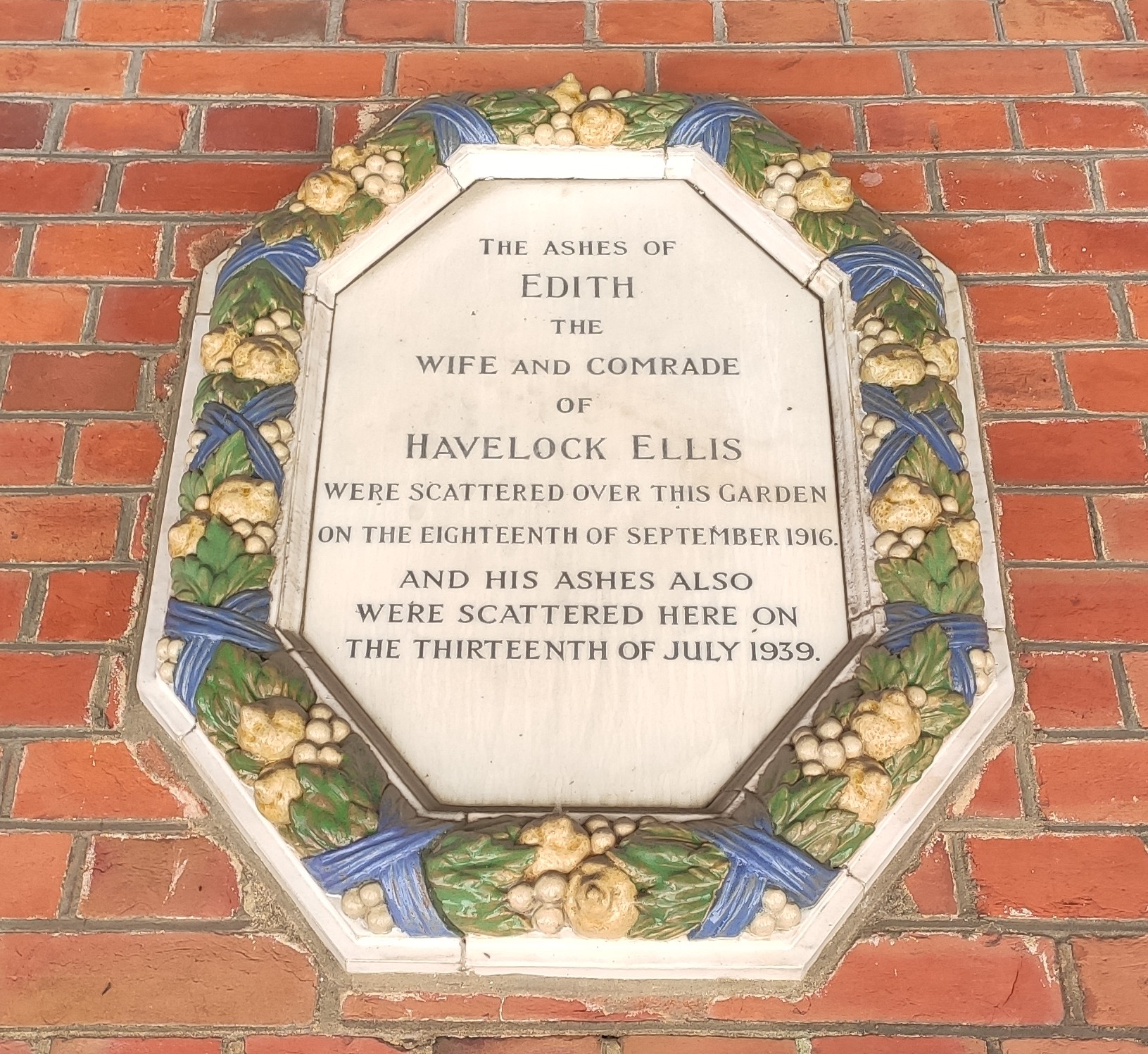
Plaque dedicated to Ellis and her husband at Golders Green Crematorium

Ellis had a nervous breakdown in March 1916 and died of diabetes that September. She was cremated at Golders Green Crematorium. James Hinton: a Sketch, her biography of surgeon James Hinton, was published posthumously in 1918.

== Works ==
- Seaweed: A Cornish Idyll. London: University Press. 1898.
- My Cornish Neighbours (1906)
- Kit's Woman (U.S. title: Steve's Woman) (1907)
- The Subjection of Kezia (1908)
- Attainment (1909)
- Three Modern Seers (1910)
- The Imperishable Wing (1911)
- The Lover's Calendar: An Anthology (ed) (1912)
- Love-Acre (1914)
- Love in Danger (1915)
- The Mothers (1915)
- James Hinton: A Sketch. Stanley Paul. 1918.
- The New Horizon in Love and Life (1921)
