= Helen Silcock =

Helen Fairhurst (née Silcock, 1865–1951) was initially a textile worker who became a trade unionist, suffragette and president of the Wigan and District Weavers, Winders, Reelers and Beamers Association, a virtually all-women trade union. She fought to introduce suffrage amendments to the TUC (Trades Union Congress) and campaigned for the NUWSS (National Union of Women's Suffrage Societies). She was part of a group of female campaigners known as "radical suffragists" which also included Sarah Reddish, Ada Nield Chew and Selina Cooper.

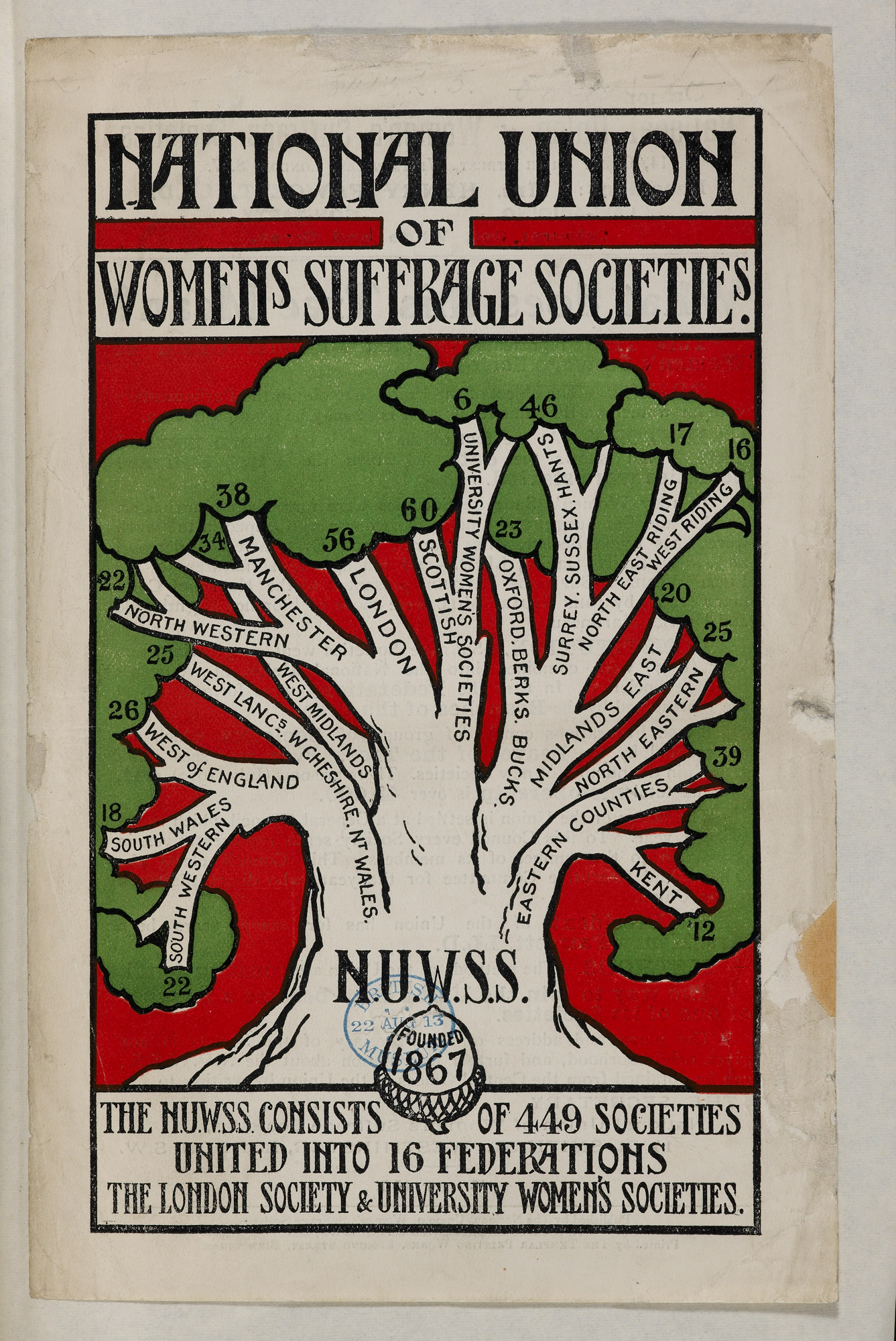
National Union of Women's Suffrage Societies poster

== Speech at the TUC in 1901 ==
Helen Silcock is known for raising the issue of female suffrage at the notoriously hostile, male-dominated TUC in 1901 where she called for suffrage amendments. The speech was met with applause, but instead of supporting women's suffrage, the TUC extended the franchise to all adult men and women which was dubbed the "adultist approach".

"It is said that women are sufficiently protected by their husbands. I would point out that not all women are wives. There are in fact 5 million working women in this country who have to earn their own livelihood, some protection should be extended to them, so that by means of the vote they may assist in bringing about legislation which will enable them to live and not merely exist."

== Involvement in Thorley Smith's Parliamentary Campaign ==
Led by Helen Silcock, the Wigan Weavers, Winders, Reelers and Beamers Association, organised and promoted Thorley Smith’s campaign to stand for Parliament in the 1906 General Election in Wigan, Lancashire. Thorley Smith was the first person to stand for Parliament in support of women's suffrage. In their campaign, the Wigan Weavers waited at tram sheds and on street corners in an effort to generate support from male voters.
