= Thorley Smith =

British women's suffrage candidate

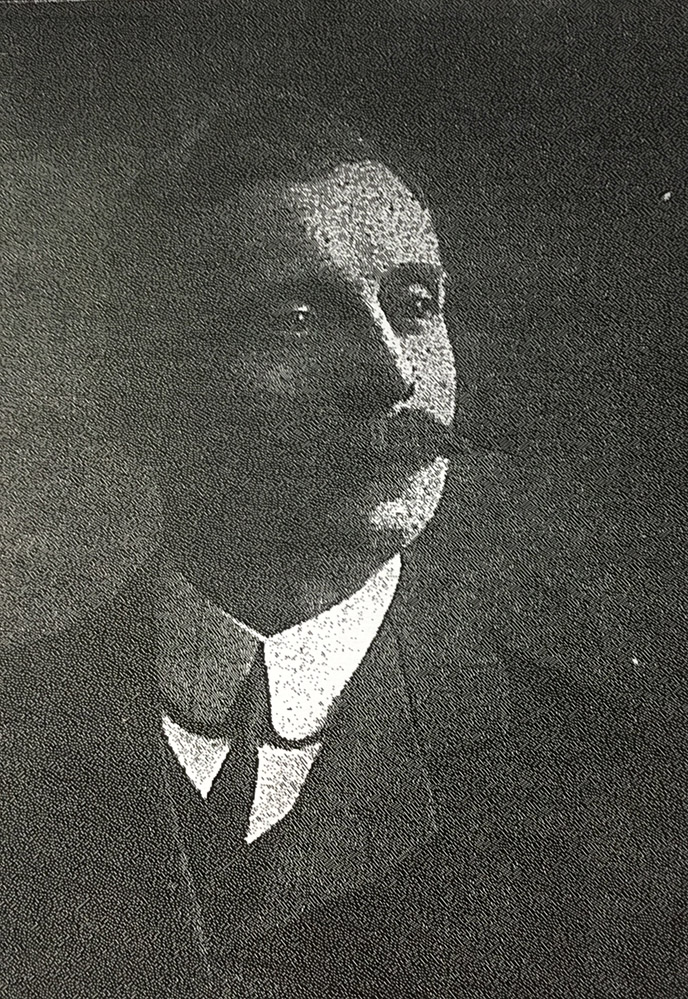
- Thorley Smith
- Born: 17 January 1873; Standish, Lancashire
- Died: 5 January 1940 (aged 66)
- Occupation: Stonemason
- Known for: first candidate to be a Women's suffrage M.P.
- Political party: Independent Labour Party
- Spouse: A.L.Smith

Thorley Smith (1873 - 1940) was Britain's first Parliamentary candidate to stand on a platform of women's suffrage. He stood in the 1906 general election in Wigan, Lancashire. He lost to the Conservative candidate, but polled more votes than the Liberal.

He replaced Hubert Sweeney, who had been the Women's Suffrage candidate-elect from 1904 to 1905. Sweeney, a Headmaster for London's Hackney School Board, a trainee barrister and a member of the London Ethical Society, had been chosen by a committee of the North of England Society for Women's Suffrage. The Lancashire and Cheshire Women Textile and Other Workers Representation Committee was a group of suffragists, not suffragettes associated with the Pankhurts' Women's Social and Political Union.

== Hubert Sweeney's campaign ==
Hubert Sweeney's Wigan campaign began in January 1904. The organisation and publicising of his candidature was undertaken by a group of suffragist working women of the female-led Wigan and District Weavers, Winders, Reelers and Beamers Association. The union was, at this time, independent of the male-led Amalgamated Weavers Association. The committee had been founded in 1903, and its president was Fairhurst (née Silcock).

She worked in partnership with members of Women's Labour and Suffrage societies, the Lancashire and Committee, and leading (male) members of Wigan's labour movement. In Wigan, Esther Roper and Eva Gore Booth (secretaries of the committee) Sarah Reddish from Bolton (president of Bolton's Co-operative Women's Guild and treasurer of the committee) Selina Cooper (Nelson/Burnley Poor Law Guardian.) and Mrs Pankhurst (WSPU, Manchester,), John Hodge, founder member of Wigan's Labour Representation Committee, member of Wigan and District Trades and Labour Council and president of the British Steel Smelters, Mill and Tinplate Workers’ Association, Mr. James Parkinson (Wigan's Labour MP 1918–1941) of the Miners Union, Mr E. Taylor, of Wigan and District Trades and Labour Council and Mr Thorley Smith its treasurer, gave their public support throughout his candidature.

In the light of her later repudiation working women suffragists, Mrs Pankhurst, (seconded by John Hodge), whilst moving 9 January meeting's resolution stated her personal support thus, she, ‘heartily sympathise with the Women’s Textile Representation Committee in their struggle to gain the franchise for women workers of the country’. Her daughter Christobel Pankhurst (WSPU) addressed meetings of the Trades Council to solicit their support the WSPU standpoint, this was taken to the branches where three quarters were in favour. This evidence of Helen Fairhurst's (née Silcock) activism runs contrary to Jill Liddleton and Jill Norris’ suggestion that after 1902, she appeared to have lost interest in women's suffrage,

In December 1905, Hubert Sweeney resigned, after two years as candidate. It appeared that had he stood for Parliament in 1906, he would have lost his livelihood in London. MPs received no salary.

== Thorley Smith's candidature ==
Thorley Smith replaced him as Wigan's Women's Suffrage candidate. Thorley Smith was born in Standish Wigan in 1873, third son of a monumental stonemason). He married at Christ Church, Ince, Lancashire; his wife, Mrs A.L.Smith, was also involved in local labour politics. Thorley Smith was the Stonemason's delegate on Wigan Trades and Labour Council and was its treasurer; he chaired the meeting that established the Wigan and District Labour Representation Committee; chaired several labour meetings including an outdoor meeting of the unemployed; he was the first labour member of Wigan Town Council. His election programme reflected his labour leanings, he promised to support and campaign for all the current organised labour platforms whilst at the same time giving Women's Suffrage his first priority.

The Conservative-Liberal Unionist Government resigned in December 1905, and a general election was called for 12 January to 8 February 1906. Polling in Wigan was on 17 January. Thorley Smith's campaign began around 2–3 January.

=== Wigan and District Trades and Labour Council ===
Despite Thorley Smith's credentials, Wigan and District Trades and Labour Council refused to endorse his candidature or ‘accord him any moral support’. Expressions of respect were made regarding his character, but the consensus was that he had been ill-advised in becoming the Woman's Suffrage candidate without consulting them first. They refused to consider it was urgency that led him to begin his campaign immediately. Stating ‘within the Trades Council there was’...’evidence of a decided opinion on the advisability of him accepting the Women’s offer’...that ‘delegates from the larger branches strongly objected to the suffragists coming into the field at the eleventh hour with a fresh candidate and expecting the trades unionists to accept their dictum without consultation’.

The political activism of women's suffrage was an anathema. Accusations were made that Thorley Smith was acting as the ‘cats paw’ of women and that if successful then it would lead to ‘petticoat’ governments. Wigan's press had their own political allegiances. The Observer's opinions had a Liberal bias whilst the Examiner was Conservative. Thorley Smith received letters of support from MPs Will Crooks and David Shackleton

=== The campaign ===
During the fortnight-long Women's Suffrage campaign over 80 meetings were held in Wigan. Due to lack of funds most political meetings were held in the open air. Thorley Smith's ‘doughty henchwomen’, i.e. Wigan's working weavers, addressed four meetings each day, at factory gates, on street corners, at the gas works and tram sheds: anywhere they could find male voters. Thorley Smith, supported by visiting women speakers, held two or three open-air meetings each evening. These women were named in the press.

‘Many smiled at the idea of women running an election’ but ‘they did not laugh now, because they realised the earnestness of those women. They had stood on street corners, propagating their cause and earned the respect of their opponents. Out in the cold blast of winter they had fought well and nobly and could return to their homes content with what they had done. He felt that from the way they had conducted that campaign they could fight better than any other body’.

On election day, Thorley Smith was accompanied by six political ‘Amazons’ who ‘amazed the natives’, as they drove through Wigan pulled by four horses with two women outriders and the leaders and individuals of various women's groups active in Wigan. In the carriage were Mrs Pankhurst, Eva Gore-Booth, Esther Roper, Selina Cooper, Sarah Reddish and Dora Montefiore.

=== Results of poll ===
The election results astounded many. The Wigan Examiner pronounced ‘We cannot believe there are 2,205 women’s suffragists among voters in Wigan’.

The results were:- Sir Francis Sharp Powell, Conservative 3,573 votes Thorley Smith Women's Suffrage 2,205 votes William Woods Liberal 1,900 votes.
