= Margaret Aldersley =

British suffragist and feminist (c. 1852–1940)

- Born: c. 1852; Burnley, Lancashire, England
- Died: 1940
- Occupations: Suffragist, feminist and trade unionist

Margaret Aldersley (c. 1852–1940) was a British suffragist, feminist and trade unionist.

== Biography ==
Born in 1852 in Burnley, Lancashire into a working-class family, Aldersley originally worked in the textile industry before becoming involved as an organiser and campaigner in Lancashire in the cause for women's suffrage.

In early 1903 radical suffragists including Selina Cooper, Sarah Reddish, Esther Roper and Eva Gore-Booth who were also union members in the cotton trade unions spoke in various cotton towns in Lancashire to branches of the weavers' unions to ask them to ballot their members on the issue of making suffrage a trade union issue. While the majority of members of the union were women its leaders were men and the female membership did not believe the male leaders understood or had their best interests at heart – including the issue of women's suffrage. The branches in Bolton, Clitheroe, Colne, Nelson, Hyde and Haslingden all agreed. feeling that they did not have the unqualified support of the new the Labour Representation Committee (soon to become the Labour Party) they set up the Lancashire and Cheshire Women Textile Workers' Representation Committee (TWC) which was devoted to women's suffrage from the start and of which Aldersley was a founding committee member.

In the provinces Selina Cooper, Ada Nield Chew and Aldersley, experienced labour activists from Lancashire, addressed Welsh mining communities in the Ammanford and Gwendraeth valleys, while Sarah Dickenson supported local leaders such as Minnie Davies of Lampeter and Catherine Smith in the rural area around Llanelli.

In around 1910 Aldersley joined the Nelson & Clitheroe Suffrage Society alongside Mary Atkinson, Harriette Beanland, Cissy Foley, Clara Staton and Selina Cooper before becoming an organiser for the National Union of Women's Suffrage Societies (NUWSS) in 1912 and a member of the executive committee. When in 1912 the NUWSS established the Election Fighting Fund committee (EFF) headed by Catherine Marshall to collect funds and support the Labour Party Aldersley was among the local organisers. During the election of 1913–14 the EFF intervened in four by-elections and although Labour won none, the Liberals lost two.

In 1913 Aldersley was involved in the campaign for female suffrage during the Keighley by-elections on behalf of the NUWSS. When she and Selina Cooper went to address an open-air meeting in Haworth on the subject of women's suffrage Coopers's daughter, Mary, was an eyewitness to what happened:

'The men threw rotten eggs and tomatoes and all sorts of things… we sheltered in a café. Mrs Aldersley went out and came back crying – covered with eggs and tomatoes… My mother went out, and she said, "I'm stopping here, whatever you throw, so go and fetch all the stuff you've got to throw, because," she says, "this blooming village would never have been known about but for three women – the Brontes".'

In 1915 Aldersley was invited to the International Woman Suffrage Alliance peace conference at The Hague in 1915 but she was unable to attend owing to the restriction of movement during World War I. During the 1920s Aldersley and Selina Cooper were involved in local welfare issues and had no links with the NUCF. In 1934 they became involved in ant-fascism when Oswald Mosley formed the British Union of Fascists (BUF), but despite their best efforts the BUF was able to establish a branch in Nelson, Lancashire after disillusioned mill-workers became convinced by Mosley's plan to stimulate the textile industry by banning cotton imports.

Margaret Aldersley died in 1940.
