= Statue of Millicent Fawcett =

Sculpture by Gillian Wearing in London

Millicent Fawcett
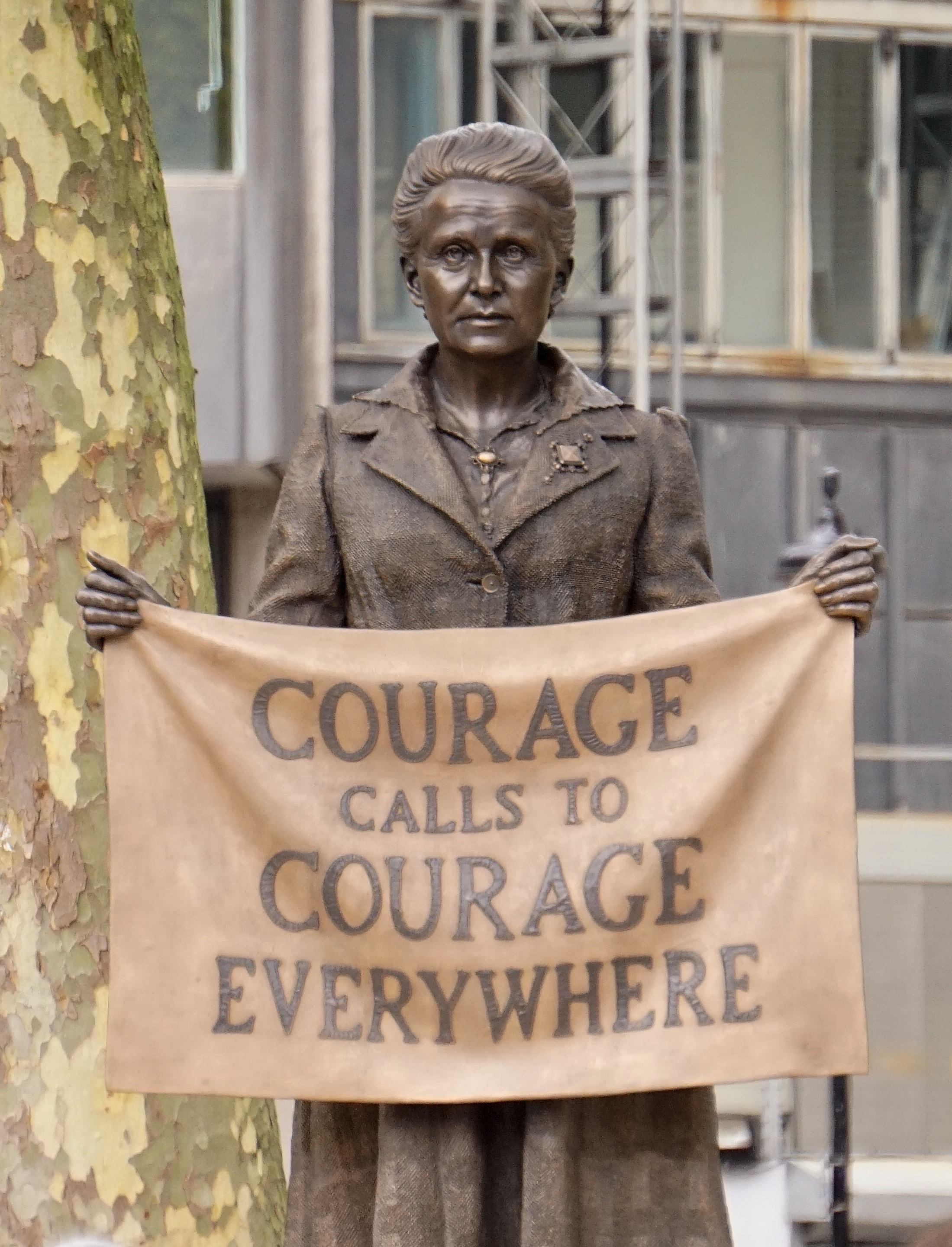
- Artist: Gillian Wearing
- Year: 2018; 8 years ago
- Type: Bronze
- Location: London, SW1P 3JX United Kingdom; 51°30′02.6″N 00°07′38.0″W

The statue of Millicent Fawcett in Parliament Square, Westminster, London, honours the British suffragist leader and social campaigner Dame Millicent Fawcett. It was made in 2018 by Gillian Wearing. Following a campaign and petition by the activist Caroline Criado Perez, the statue's creation was endorsed by both the prime minister of the United Kingdom, Theresa May, and the mayor of London, Sadiq Khan. The statue, Parliament Square's first monument to a woman and also its first sculpture by a woman, was funded through the government's Centenary Fund, which marks 100 years since some women won the right to vote. The memorial was unveiled on 24 April 2018.

== Description ==
The bronze statue portrays Dame Millicent at the age of 50, when she became president of the National Union of Women's Suffrage Societies (NUWSS). The figure holds a banner reading COURAGE/ CALLS TO/ COURAGE/ EVERYWHERE, an extract from a speech Fawcett gave in 1920. She wears a walking suit, typical attire of that period featuring an overcoat and a long dress. The artist integrated the pattern and texture of the tweed fabric into the bronze of the suit. The Fawcett Society lent a piece of Fawcett's jewellery to Wearing, who scanned the brooch and incorporated it into the statue's design.

The initial design was modified following feedback from members of Westminster City Council, as they felt that the sign Fawcett was holding made her look as if she were hanging laundry out to dry. Wearing modified her design to move Fawcett's hands to the corners of the sign, and lowered and flattened the sign itself.

=== List of engravings ===
The names and images of 59 women and four men who supported women's suffrage appear on the statue's plinth. They are as follows:

- Louisa Garrett Anderson
- Dame Margery Corbett Ashby
- Margaret Ashton
- Minnie Baldock
- Frances Balfour
- Lydia Becker
- Rosa May Billinghurst
- Teresa Billington-Greig
- Helen Blackburn
- Ada Nield Chew
- Frances Power Cobbe
- Jessie Craigen
- Emily Wilding Davison
- Charlotte Despard
- Flora Drummond
- Elizabeth Clarke Wolstenholme Elmy
- Isabella Ford
- Henrietta Franklin
- Mary Gawthorpe
- Eva Gore-Booth
- Anna Haslam
- Claude Hinscliff
- Laurence Housman
- Edith How-Martyn
- Elsie Inglis
- Annie Kenney
- George Lansbury
- Minnie Lansbury
- Mary Lowndes
- Mary Macarthur
- Margaret Mackworth, 2nd Viscountess Rhondda
- Chrystal Macmillan
- Catherine Marshall
- Eva McLaren
- Priscilla Bright McLaren
- Dora Montefiore
- Edith Mansell Moullin
- Catherine Osler
- Maud Palmer, Countess of Selborne
- Adela Pankhurst
- Dame Christabel Pankhurst
- Emmeline Pankhurst
- Sylvia Pankhurst
- Emmeline Pethick-Lawrence
- Frederick Pethick-Lawrence
- Agnes Pochin
- Eleanor Rathbone
- Sarah Reddish
- Annot Robinson
- Esther Roper
- Lolita Roy
- Agnes Maude Royden
- Julia Scurr
- Hanna Sheehy-Skeffington
- Sophia Duleep Singh
- Nessie Stewart-Brown
- Ray Strachey
- Helena Swanwick
- Ellen Wilkinson.

== The campaign for a woman on Parliament Square ==
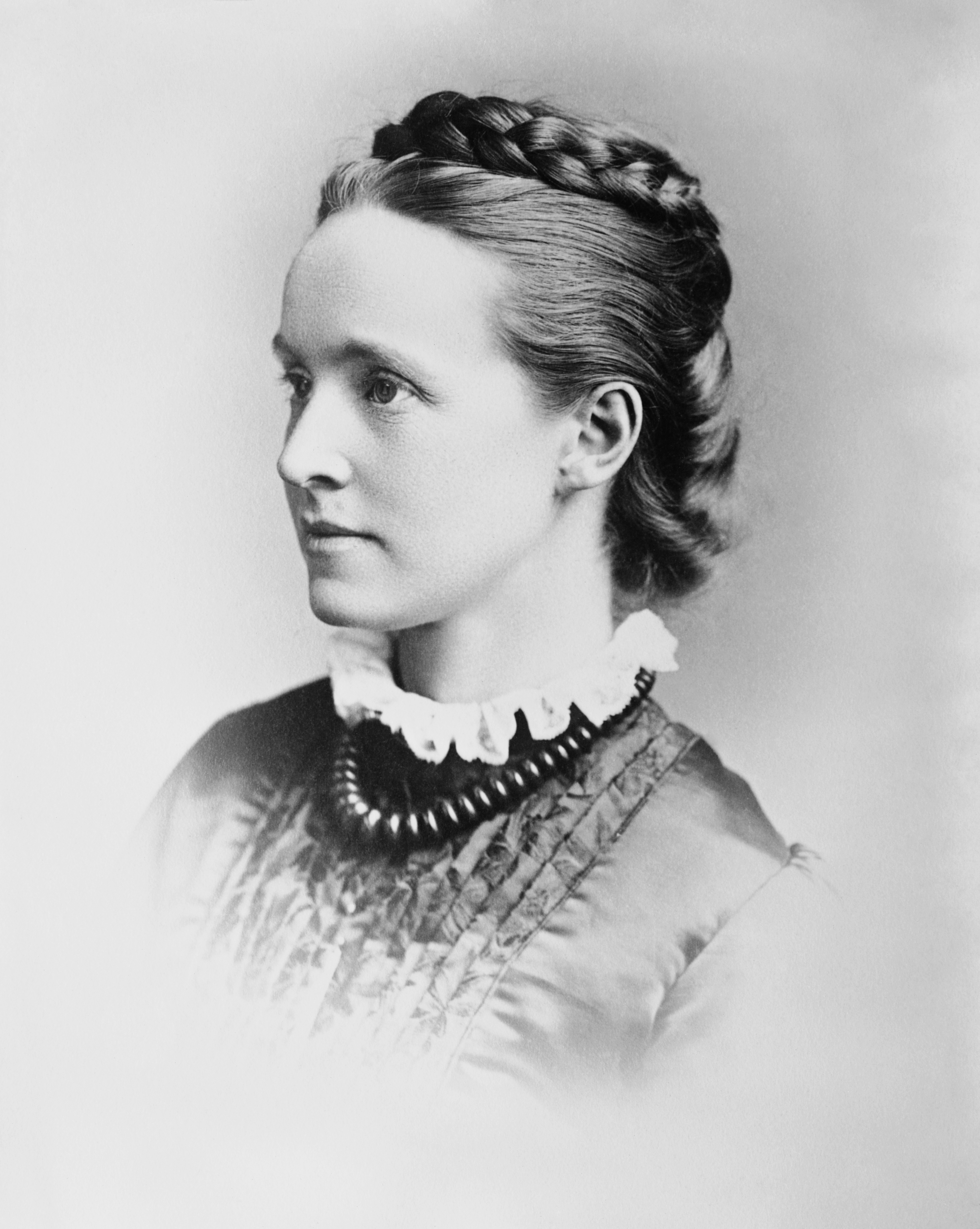
Millicent Fawcett

The feminist campaigner and journalist Caroline Criado Perez began a campaign to install a statue of a woman in Parliament Square on 8 March (International Women's Day) 2016, after noticing while jogging that day that all the existing statues on the square were of men. Criado Perez had initiated the 2013 campaign to add a woman to British banknotes, after Elizabeth Fry was replaced by Winston Churchill on the £5 note, and soon thereafter the Bank of England announced that Jane Austen would appear on the new £10 note.

The campaign called for a statue of a suffragette to be placed in Parliament Square in time for the centenary of the Representation of the People Act 1918. Following some research, Criado Perez discovered that only 2.7 percent of the statues in the United Kingdom were of individual women who were not members of the British royal family. On 10 May 2016, to launch the campaign, an open letter was written to the new Mayor of London, Sadiq Khan, signed by 42 prominent women, requesting a statue of a suffragette in Parliament Square by February 2018. Khan quickly agreed to a new suffragette statue, but did not commit to Parliament Square and instead said that the authorities would "explore a suitable site for the statue".

An online petition for the suffragette statue received 74,000 signatures. This was presented to Parliament on 7 June, in an event hosted by the Fawcett Society. At the same time, Criado Perez stated that she backed Millicent Fawcett as the subject of the statue, adding that "It's shocking that she doesn't already have a statue of her own – and Parliament Square is the obvious place for her to be. Not round the corner, or up the road. Nothing less than Parliament Square will do."

On 2 April 2017, it was announced that a statue of Fawcett would be erected in Parliament Square. The Prime Minister, Theresa May, said following the announcement, "The example Millicent Fawcett set during the struggle for equality continues to inspire the battle against the burning injustices of today. It is right and proper that she is honoured in Parliament Square alongside former leaders who changed our country." The Suffrage Statue Commission selected Gillian Wearing, a former Turner Prize winner, to create the statue with it funded from the Government's Centenary Fund.

The statue was part of the 14-18 NOW series of artistic commissions that marked the centenary commemorations of World War I.

=== Rival campaigns ===
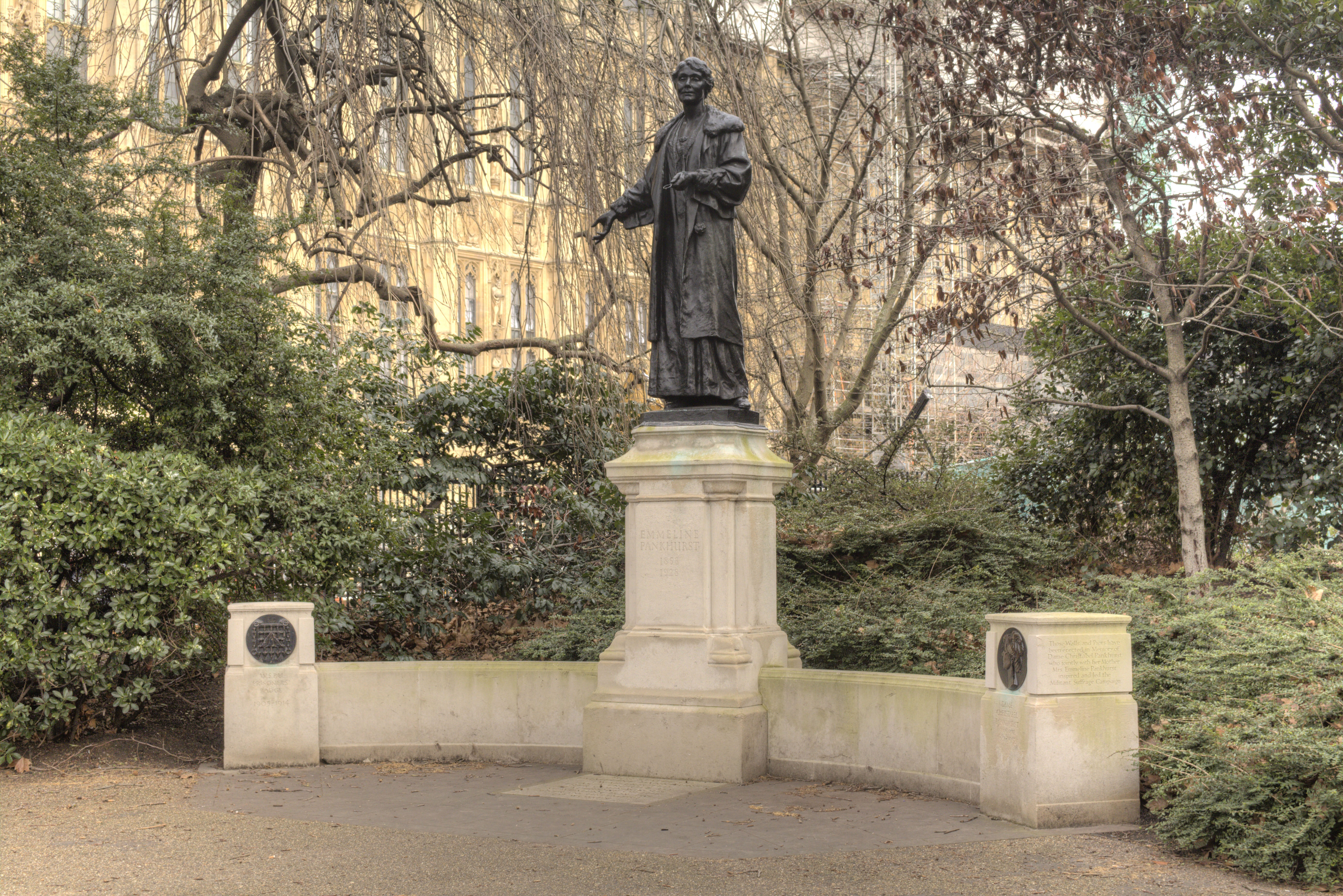
The Emmeline and Christabel Pankhurst Memorial in Victoria Tower Gardens in 2015

In addition to the campaign for a statue of Fawcett, a rival campaign existed to install a statue of Emmeline Pankhurst in Parliament Square, which had begun in 2014. This campaign was backed by the former Prime Minister David Cameron, the former MP Neil Thorne, the Leader of the House of Commons Andrea Leadsom and the first female Speaker of the House of Commons Betty Boothroyd. An existing statue of Pankhurst, the Emmeline and Christabel Pankhurst Memorial, has stood in Victoria Tower Gardens next to the Palace of Westminster since 1958. The Pankhurst campaign had initially sought to move this statue into Parliament Square, but discovered that it was too small to be placed there. The campaign commissioned sculptor Angela Conner to produce a 12 ft (3.7 m) tall statue of Pankhurst. Discussions were held about installing a pair of statues in the square, portraying both Fawcett and Pankhurst.

Campaigners from the two suffragette campaigns met, but after Thorne gained the initial agreement of Westminster City Council to place two statues, the Fawcett campaign turned this down following a second meeting between the parties. Criado Perez said that she was "not prepared to compromise on the central point of the campaign, which was to have a statue for a new woman and have one front and centre", and feared that a pair of statues would be featured less prominently in the square than a single one. The decision was made by Westminster City Council in favour of the Fawcett statue; they stated that a future statue of Pankhurst in the square had not been deferred but the existing statue in Victoria Tower Gardens would need to be moved elsewhere.

Thorne said that, following the decision, the statue of Pankhurst created for Parliament Square would instead be placed for the time being in Brompton Cemetery, the place of her burial, while a decision on the Victoria Tower Gardens was made. In addition to the discussion of the suffragette statue, a further campaign was underway to have a statue of the former Prime Minister Margaret Thatcher erected in Parliament Square. The Council turned down the application as it did not meet the 10-year rule (that a minimum of 10 years have to pass following the subject's death) and that the Thatcher family opposed the design. Other statues of Thatcher exist in London: the one in the Guildhall was decapitated in 2002, and the following year another was commissioned for the interior of the Palace of Westminster. Others commented that the location was the appropriate one, but that the statue should be of someone more radical: Mary Wollstonecraft, Sylvia Pankhurst or Emily Davison.

== Unveiling ==
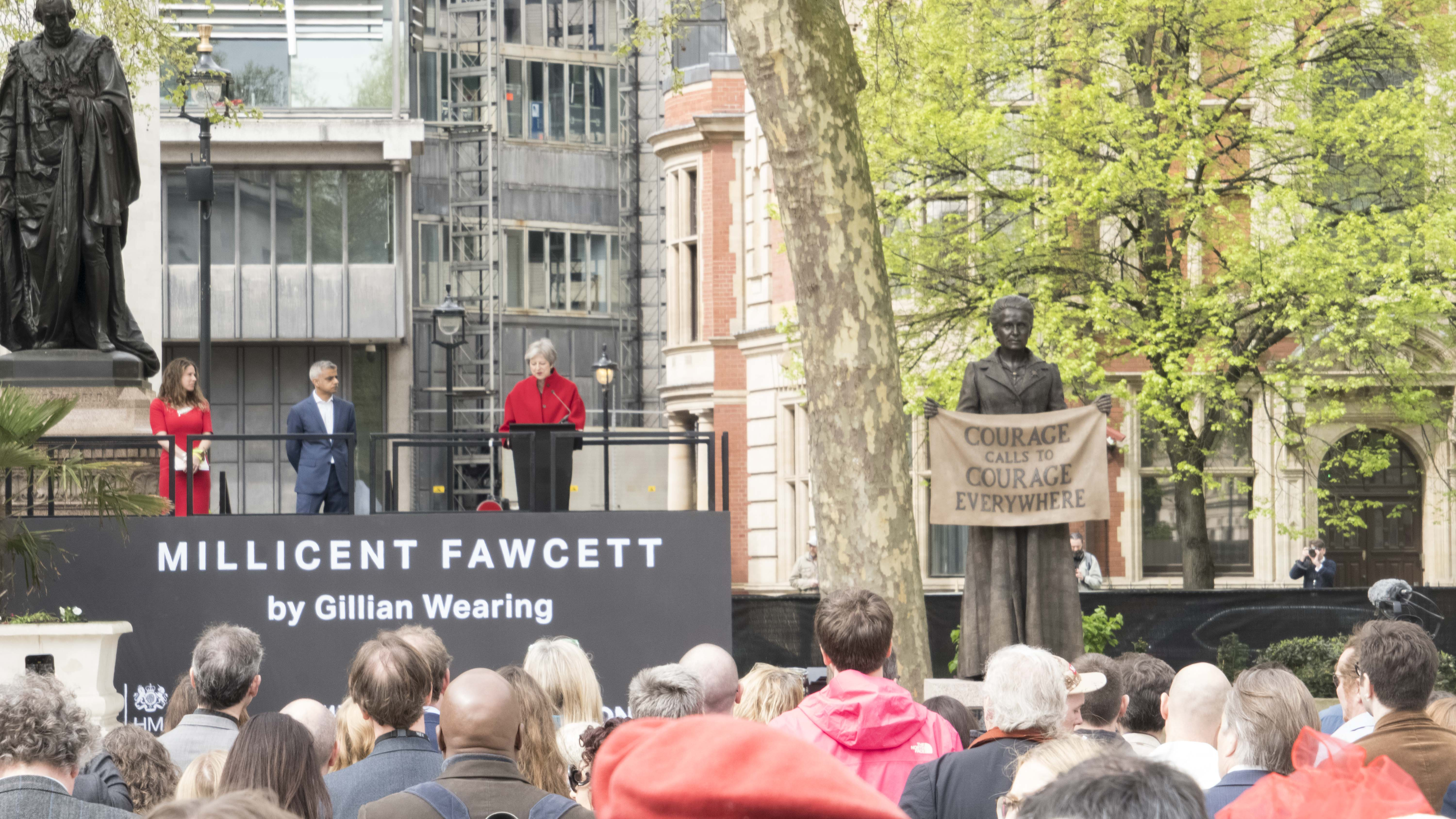
Theresa May speaking at the unveiling of the statue

On 24 April 2018, the statue was unveiled in an hour-long ceremony featuring the Prime Minister, the Mayor of London, schoolchildren and choirs. The unveiling itself was performed by three generations of women and girls: Jennifer Loehnis (a descendant of Fawcett), Criado Perez, Justine Simons (Deputy Mayor for Culture and Creative Industries) and two schoolgirls from Millbank Academy in Westminster, and Platanos College, Lambeth. At the event, May credited the work of Fawcett not only achieving votes for women but for allowing her and other female MPs to take their positions in Parliament. Poet and former Young People's Laureate for London, Theresa Lola, also performed her commissioned poem, 'For Those Who Listen When Courage Calls,' to commemorate the unveiling of the statue.

Criado Perez called the unveiling of the statue "one hell of a start" in increasing the representation of women across Britain in both cultural and political spheres. Similar views were supported by Khan, the Labour Party leader Jeremy Corbyn and the former Labour deputy leader Harriet Harman, who suggested that the square's male statues be temporarily moved elsewhere in London to allow there to be only female statues in this prominent location.

== Reaction and commentary ==
The arts editor for BBC News, Will Gompertz, gave the statue five stars in his review. He said that prior to the unveiling, the only statues which stood out in the square were those of Winston Churchill and David Lloyd George, but that has changed with the arrival of the Fawcett statue. He credited the campaign of Criado Perez, and said that the Wearing's execution of the brief was "exceptional". Gompertz praised the overall conception of the design and said that the banner was compelling. He suggested that the design was influenced by Wearing's early 1990s work Signs That Say What You Want Them To Say And Not Signs That Say What Someone Else Wants You To Say in which she took a series of photographs of strangers holding up their personal thoughts on pieces of white card. Overall, he felt that the statue had such impact that it changed the context of Parliament Square, saying that "The Fawcett statue makes most of the others look ridiculous, or pompous or both" (excepting its immediate neighbour, the statue of Gandhi) and that it gave the area a focal point lacking since the end of Brian Haw's peace protest.

June Purvis, emeritus professor of women's and gender history at the University of Portsmouth, criticised some elements of the statue, saying that while the message on the banner was indeed written by Fawcett about Emily Davison, it was not written at the time of her death but instead in the "relative safety" of 1920. At the time of Emily Davison's death, Fawcett's NUWSS refused to take part in the funeral and did not send a wreath. Purvis also highlighted that the image of Emily Davison is on the rear of the statue, and that the campaign was launched with the intention of commemorating a suffragette, not a suffragist, in Parliament Square.

== See also ==
- PROCESSIONS, a mass participation artwork to mark the 100th anniversary of women's suffrage in Britain
- List of monuments and memorials to women's suffrage
