= Catherine Osler =

British social reformer and suffragist (1854–1924)

- crop of Edward S. Harper portrait
- Born: Catherine Courtauld Taylor; 26 February 1854; Bridgwater, England
- Died: 16 December 1924 (aged 70); Edgbaston, England
- Spouse: Alfred Ostler

Catherine Osler or Catherine Courtauld Osler; Catherine Courtauld Taylor (26 February 1854 – 16 December 1924) was a British social reformer and suffragist.

== Biography ==
Osler was born in Bridgwater in 1854 to William and Catherine Taylor. Her Unitarian parents were members of the Birmingham Women's Suffrage Society from its formation. Catherine was their eldest child and she rose through the ranks of the society as she went from treasurer to secretary in 1885.

She married Alfred Osler who ran the family firm of F & C Osler of Birmingham, a firm famous for the design and manufacture of fine crystal, exemplified by magnificent pieces such as chandeliers to be found in grand buildings in many parts of the world. Alfred Osler was a member of the Liberal Party. In 1888 the Women's Liberal Federation had a conference in Birmingham and Catherine Osler was asked to preside over it. Four years later the Women's Emancipation Union met in Birmingham and Osler was invited to chair a session where she shared her ambition to get women involved in local government.

In 1903, she became the President of the Birmingham Women's Suffrage Society.

Osler was opposed to the actions of the militant suffragettes and she had written to criticise the actions of the Women's Social and Political Union. However she did not approve of the way the WSPU militants were treated in prison. In 1909, she resigned as President of the Birmingham Women's Liberal Association citing her objection to the Liberal government's policy of force feeding suffragette prisoners.

In 1911, Osler joined the executive committee of the National Union of Women's Suffrage Societies (NUWSS). Osler was also active in Birmingham trying to establish a role for women in local government.

In 1919, Osler was given a master's degree by Birmingham University for her work in support of the social standing of her gender. Osler died in Edgbaston in 1924. A portrait of her by local artist Edward Harper was commissioned and is now in a local gallery.

Her name and picture (and those of 58 other women's suffrage supporters) are on the plinth of the statue of Millicent Fawcett in Parliament Square, London, unveiled in 2018.

== Works ==
- Why Women Need the Vote, 1910
