= Mary Atkinson (suffragette) =

British suffragist and trade unionist

- Born: 19th century Lancashire, England
- Known for: Suffragist activism

Mary Atkinson was a British suffragette and trade unionist.

== Biography ==
Born in Lancashire, Mary Atkinson grew up in Brierfield. She worked as a textile worker and joined the Textile Committee (Lancashire and Cheshire Women Textile and other Worker's Representation Committee). In 1910, she began her campaign for women's suffrage and became a member of the Nelson & Clitheroe Suffrage Society, alongside Harriette Beanland, Margaret Aldersley, Cissy Foley, Clara Staton and Selina Cooper.

== See also ==
- Women's suffrage
- Suffragette
- List of suffragists and suffragettes
- List of British suffragists and suffragettes
- Feminism in the United Kingdom
