= Harriette Beanland =

British suffragette (1886–1922)

- Born: Harriette Mary Beanland; 5 November 1866; Chester, Cheshire, England, United Kingdom of Great Britain and Ireland
- Died: 2 March 1922 (aged 55); Australia
- Occupations: Political activist, suffragette, and syndicalist
- Political party: Independent Labour Party (ILP)
- Movement: Nelson & Clitheroe Suffrage Society, National Industrial and Professional Women's Suffrage Society, Women's Labour League, Women's Social and Political Union, Women's Social and Political Union (WSPU)

Harriette Mary Beanland (5 November 1866 – 2 March 1922) was a British textile worker and suffragette who was secretary to the Women's Labour League branch in Nelson in Lancashire.

== Biography ==
Harriette Beanland was born in 1866 in Chester, where her father, Bolton Beanland, was based during his transfer from Jamaica to Gibraltar whilst working for the British army. Her father was originally from Colne in Lancashire. He died at age 33, and her mother, Emma Saword, died aged 38, leaving Harriette an orphan in 1876. Beanland was then under the care of her uncle, Emmett Beanland, in Gibraltar. She wrote an extensive diary based around 1874–1976 whilst living in Gibraltar. Harriett Mary Beanland worked as a textile worker in Lancashire when she moved back to England to live closer to Bolton's family. She was a member of the British Independent Labour Party (ILP). Appointed Poor Law Guardian for the City of Nelson, she worked to enforce the Poor Laws which related to the provision of financial assistance to the poorest in England and the rest of the United Kingdom between the 16th and 19th centuries.

In 1906, Beanland signed the manifesto of the Independent Labour Party in favour of women's suffrage. She joined the Nelson & Clitheroe Suffrage Society alongside Mary Atkinson and Margaret Aldersley, as well as the National Industrial and Professional Women's Suffrage Society. She became secretary of the branch of the Women's Labour League in Nelson in 1900 until its dissolution a year later.

From 1914 and the start of the First World War, some suffragettes of the Women's Social and Political Union (WSPU) left the movement in disagreement with the support shown for the fighting. A week after the start of the war, Beanland sent a letter to the Nelson Leader denouncing the support:

[It gives] the erroneous impression that countries are at war with each other. They are not. Their governments, composed of men and responsible only to the men of each country and backed by the majority of men who have caught the war and glory fever, have declared war on one another. The women of all these countries have not been consulted as to whether they would have war or not… If they (men) deliberately shut out women, the peace loving sex, from their rightful share in ruling their countries and Churches, then all the appeals and sentiments and prayers will be of no avail in preventing hostilities. Yours, etc…. HM Beanland

She died in Australia in 1922 and was buried by the Society of Friends in Sydney.

== See also ==
- Women's suffrage
- Suffragette
- List of suffragists and suffragettes
- Feminism in the United Kingdom
