= Sarah Dickenson =

British trade unionist and feminist (1868–1954)

Sarah Dickenson OBE
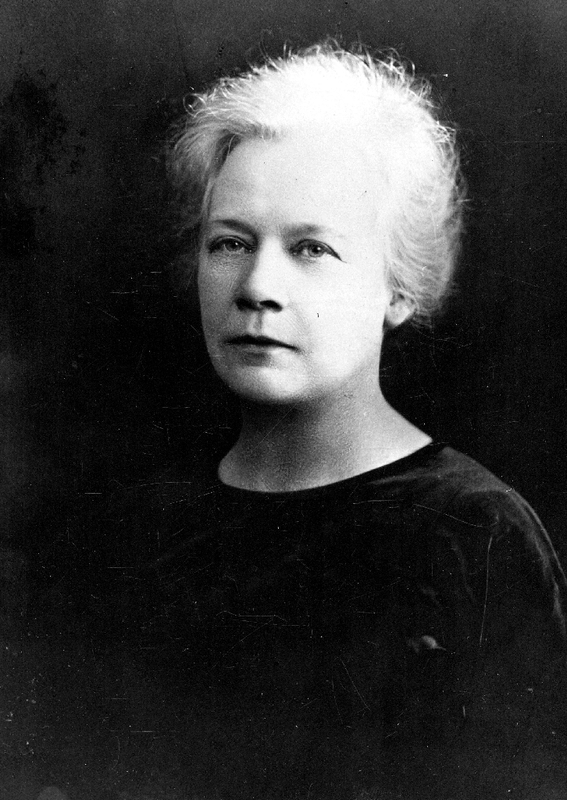
- Born: Sarah Welsh; 28 March 1868; Hulme in Manchester, England
- Died: 26 December 1954 (aged 86)
- Occupations: trade unionist, feminist activist
- Known for: unionism for women, women suffrage
- Notable work: North of England Society for Women's Suffrage, National Industrial and Professional Women's Suffrage Society

Sarah Dickenson OBE (28 March 1868 – 26 December 1954) was a British trade unionist and feminist activist.

== Early life ==
Born in Hulme in Manchester as Sarah Welsh, Dickenson left school at the age of eleven to work in a cotton mill, where she became interested in trade unionism.

== Activism ==
In 1895, she was appointed as joint organizing secretary of the new Manchester and Salford Women's Trade Union Council (WTUC). She left employment in the mill that year, devoting her time initially to the trades council and another new local organisation, the Federation of Women Workers (of which she was secretary from about 1904), then from 1899 also as a founder and the secretary of the Manchester and Salford Association of Machine, Electrical and other Women Workers.

Around 1900, Dickenson joined the North of England Society for Women's Suffrage (NESWS), a body linked with the National Union of Women's Suffrage Societies (NUWSS). She served on its executive, addressed many meetings on the subject of women's suffrage, and took a leading part in promoting a petition of women factory workers, which she jointly presented to Parliament in 1901 when it had around 30,000 signatures. The WTUC could not agree on whether to actively support the women's suffrage movement. In 1903, Dickenson was a leading founder of the rival Lancashire and Cheshire Women Textile and Other Workers' Representation Committee, which was committed to women's suffrage from the start, and she resigned from the WTUC the following year, instead joining the new Manchester and Salford Women's Trades and Labour Council.

By 1905, Dickenson was frustrated with the NESWS's preference to engage with middle-class groups, rather than the labour movement, and she resigned along with Christabel Pankhurst and several other leading members, instead forming the National Industrial and Professional Women's Suffrage Society. Dickenson served on the executive committee. She was also active in the NUWSS and sometimes took work as a paid organiser for the group. Dickenson worked with Mary Macarthur to organise a National Union of Women Workers conference in Manchester in 1907. At the conference, she argued that women should found their own unions and then, when male unions were ready to accept them, should transfer into women-only branches of those organisations.

Dickenson opposed World War I, and was a delegate to the Women's International Conference on Peace at The Hague, although she was unable to travel to it, due to wartime restrictions. She also campaigned for the government's wartime maximum wage for women to be raised, something which occurred in 1915. In 1918, the WLTC and WTUC both merged into the Manchester and Salford Trades Council, and from 1920, Dickenson was secretary to its Women's Group. She largely retired from the trade union movement in 1930, serving as a magistrate until 1939.

In 1931, she was appointed a Member of the Order of the British Empire. She died in 1954.
