= Edith Palliser =

British suffragist

Edith Charlotte Bury Palliser
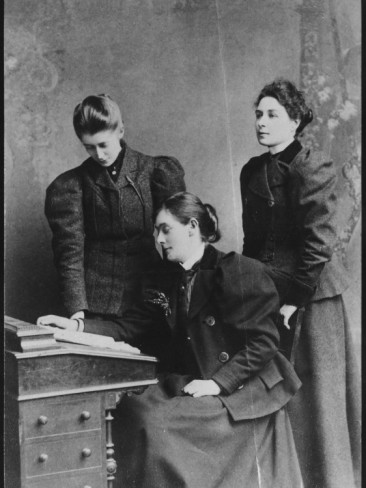
- Esther Roper (Seated), Edith Palliser (Left), Mrs. Blaxter (Right)
- Born: Edith Charlotte Bury Palliser; 22 December 1859; Comragh, County Waterford, Ireland
- Died: 25 November 1927 (aged 67); Hartfield, Sussex, England, United Kingdom

Edith Charlotte Bury Palliser (22 December 1859 – 25 November 1927), was a campaigner for women’s suffrage and rights in Great Britain and Ireland.

== Early life and education ==
Born 22 December 1859 Edith Charlotte Bury Palliser was the youngest child and only daughter to Frederick Hugh Palliser and Emily Price. Her father was from an Anglo-Irish family and was an explorer and big-game hunter, however they lost much of the family fortune during the Irish Famine and the collapse of the family plantation in Ceylon. In 1865 Palliser was living with her family in Norway but her parents separated and she returned to live in Waterford with her mother. They lived in Comeragh House, Waterford.

Edith Palliser, Mid Devon bi-election 1907/8

By 1895 Palliser had moved to London where she got a position as secretary with the Central Committee of the National Society for Women's Suffrage. Palliser was chair of the London Society for Women's Suffrage and secretary of the National Union of Women's Suffrage Societies as well as an executive member from 1911 to 1913. She remained with the campaign for suffrage until she retired in 1919. Palliser was the editor of the Women's Suffrage Record, a quarterly newspaper which she privately funded. Her subeditor was Frances Sterling. She also was co-editor of a children's text about evolution called 'The Way the World Went Then' with Helen Blackburn. She was a contributor to, and board member of The Englishwoman a feminist paper related to the National Society for Women's Suffrage. Palliser advised on the creation of the International Woman Suffrage Alliance and represented England in the first meeting in Berlin and again in Amsterdam, in 1904 and 1908. In 1915 she became chair of the London Committee of the Scottish Women's Hospitals during World War I.

Palliser spent most of her work life living in Kensington and lived with Dr Mabel Paine for some time. She died 25 November 1927 in her cousin Frances Sterling's home in Sussex.

== Legacy ==
Her work during the war was commemorated by a bed in the maternity unit of the Royal Free Hospital.

== Bibliography ==
- Women's suffrage record
- The way the world went then (1898)
- Leading facts of the movement for the parliamentary enfranchisement of women (1900)
- A letter (1906)
- Preliminary notice (1906)
- In support of Sir Charles McLaren's women's suffrage resolution (1907)
- Palliser, Edith (1907). "The International Movement for Women's Suffrage". The Case for Women's Suffrage: 135–139. Wikidata Q107245359.
- Extract from a letter issued by the Executive Committee (1911)
- Government Reform Bill and National Union policy (1912)
- Whitechapel election appeal (1913)
- Martial heroines : Agostina Zaragoza (1916)
