= Amelia Scott =

British social reformer and suffragist (1860–1952)

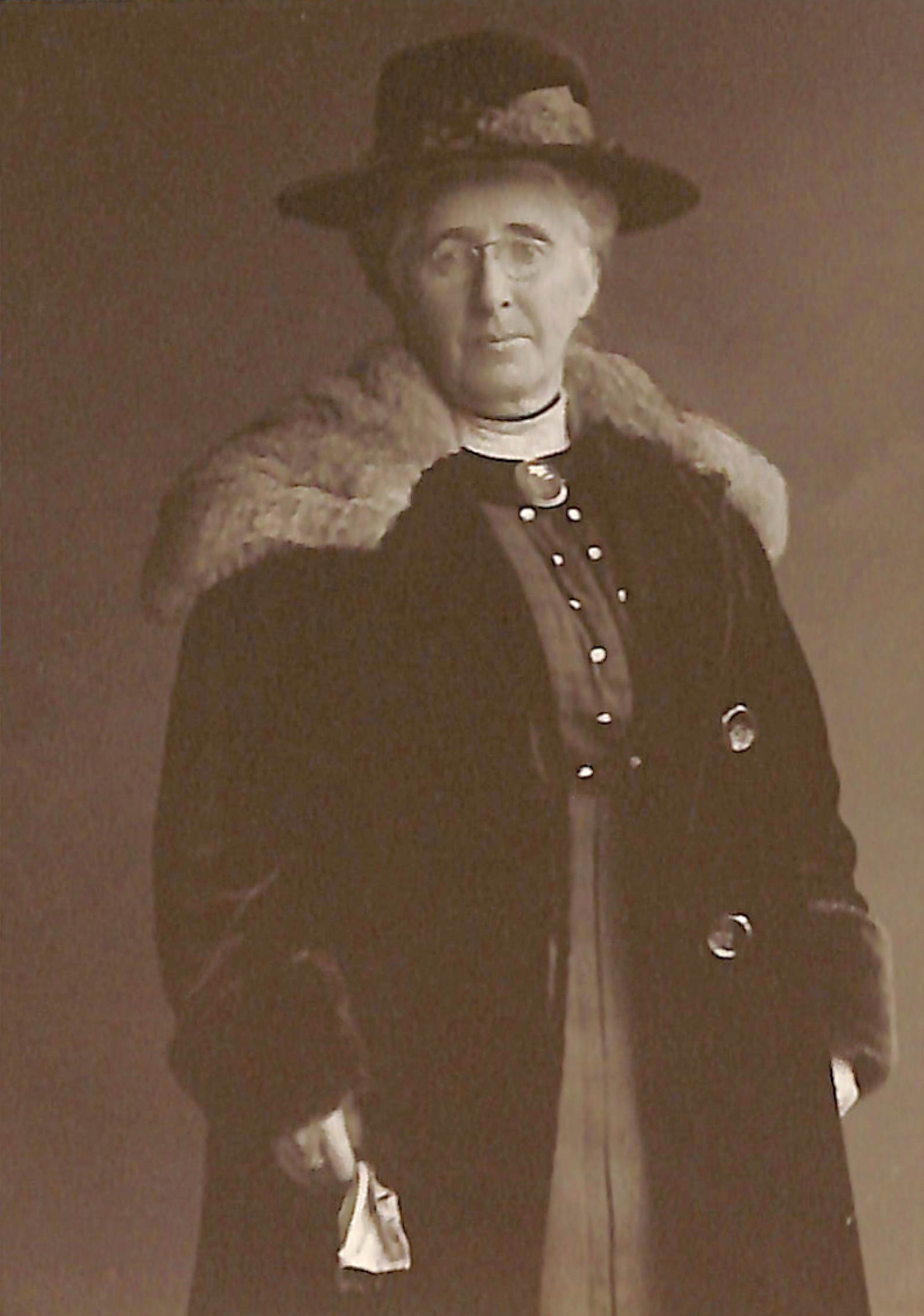
- Born: 16 January 1860; Byfleet, United Kingdom of Great Britain and Ireland
- Died: 25 March 1952 (aged 92)
- Occupations: Social Activist, Suffragist

Amelia Scott (16 January 1860 – 25 March 1952) was a British social reformer and campaigner for women's suffrage. She was one of the first two women elected as Tunbridge Wells councillors.

== Early life ==
Amelia Scott was born in Byfleet, Surrey on 16 January 1860, the fourth child of Syms Scott and his wife, Ellen (née Nicholls). Her father was Clerk to the Lord Chamberlain of London and the family were reasonably prosperous, employing in 1861 three servants, a housemaid, nursemaid and cook. By then they had moved to Southborough, near Tunbridge Wells, where Amelia's youngest sister, Louisa, was born in 1862. Syms Scott died while his children were still young and their mother later remarried. By 1881 Louisa and Amelia were living with an aunt and their grandmother, the three of them being attended to by a cook and three maids. Amelia Scott's background was therefore comfortably middle class – her aunt and grandmother were described as 'living on own means' – although the family was not exactly wealthy. Her maternal grandmother was the widow of a clergyman and there is clear evidence of Amelia's own religious belief and commitment.

After their grandmother's death Amelia and Louisa Scott set up home together, living in several premises in the Tunbridge Wells area, before finally settling in Lansdowne Road where they lived with another sister, Florence. None of the woman married but they lived in respectable residences and could afford to employ one servant. Together with their siblings, they each inherited a share of their father's estate and the sisters do not seem to have needed to take on paid work but budgets were necessarily tight as their income was limited.

== Social work ==
There is very little evidence of Amelia Scott's initial education or of the first thirty or so years of her life, although she probably participated in conventional philanthropic, Church-related activities such as running mothers' meetings and teaching Sunday school classes. She had a strong, Anglican faith and in 1898 her book, Women of Sacred History, was published.

In 1894 Scott attended a conference of the National Union of Women Workers (NUWW) at Bristol. This event was an epiphany: '[i]n those days in Tunbridge Wells we lived in our own small, self-satisfied circles, both in religion, politics and class,' she later recalled. 'At Bristol I walked into a wholly different atmosphere, and it was an atmosphere where I would be'. Inspired by this conference, she formed an NUWW branch in Tunbridge Wells, holding the initial meeting in her own home and serving as its secretary for over thirty-five years. At the first meeting, the well-known workhouse reformer, Louisa Twining (who had retired to Tunbridge Wells) took the chair. Twining, who was a Poor Law Guardian (PLG) for the Tonbridge Union, must have encouraged Scott to follow in her footsteps, as in 1901 Amelia was elected a PLG. Scott also undertook social work training in London provided by the Charity Organisation Society (COS). In 1906 the Tunbridge Wells NUWW branch, under her direction, hosted the national NUWW conference in the town's new Opera House.

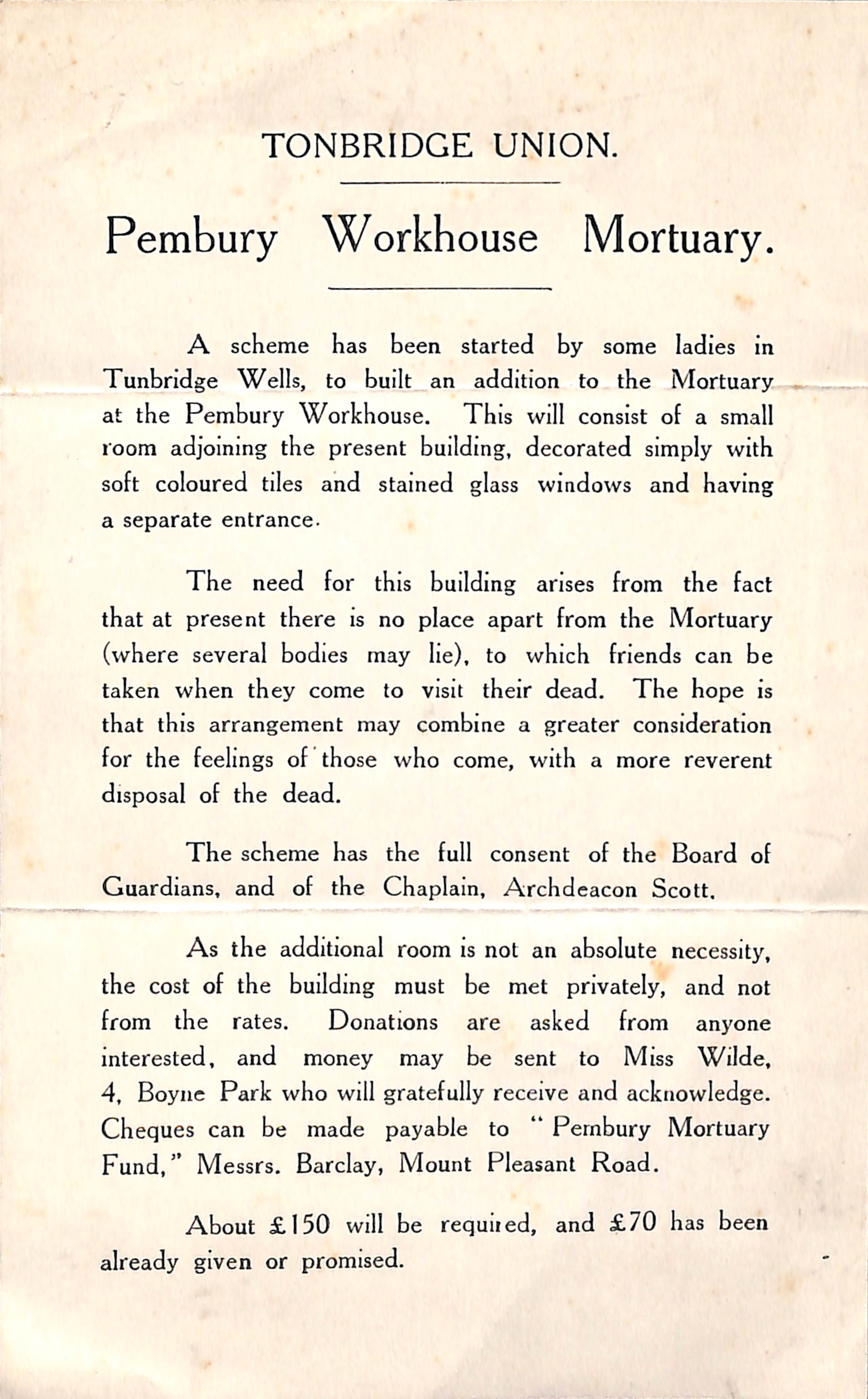
Pembury Workhouse Mortuary appeal

As a PLG Scott not only regularly inspected the workhouse premises at Pembury but also visited people for whom the Union was responsible including those who had been sent to the County Asylum at Barming, near Maidstone. She served on the Union's Finance Committee as well as the Children's Committee, the House Committee and the Mental Deficiency Committee. Her career as a PLG continued until 1930 when the Board's functions were transferred to the Kent County Council's Public Assistance Committee. According to a semi-autobiographical work about the ending of the Poor Law entitled The Passing of a Great Dread, Scott learnt a great deal from her experience as a PLG, not least from her dealings with a female vagrant to whom she gave the pseudonym 'Elspeth'. Her Poor Law work also opened her eyes to the needs of new mothers, both married, and unmarried; as well as those of young, sick and elderly workhouse inmates. Among the service improvements she championed was the construction of a proper mortuary, complete with space for the grieving relatives of the deceased.

Amelia Scott's social activism focused primarily on the needs of young, working-class women and mothers. Among her many local community projects was a hostel for working women, opened in Tunbridge Wells in 1913. Along with many NUWW activists, she had become concerned by the lack of housing provision for poor working class single women and children, other than mixed common lodging houses. The Tunbridge Wells NUWW branch raised funds to take over and refurbish a former inn and reopen it as the Crown Hostel for Women and Children. In 1931 it was reported to house 100 women and 50 children in a week.

Scott, together with her sister, Louisa and other local NUWW members also established a social club for working girls (particularly laundry workers) in Upper Grosvenor Road, Tunbridge Wells. Called the 'Leisure Hour Club for Young Women in Business', it opened its doors in 1900 and remained active for nearly twenty years. The club was supported by local philanthropists and ran excursions on bank holidays as well as holding club evenings. During the First World War it was joined by the 'Comrades' Club', where young women were able to socialise with young soldiers, under the watchful eyes of the women volunteers.

== Women's suffrage ==
Like many politically active women of her generation, Amelia Scott became an avowed supporter of women's suffrage. In 1905 the Tunbridge Wells NUWW branch held a discussion on the subject of votes for women and Scott was among those who spoke up in favour. At the 1906 NUWW annual conference in Tunbridge Wells a memorable, heated debate on women's suffrage took place, chaired by the national suffrage leader, Millicent Fawcett.

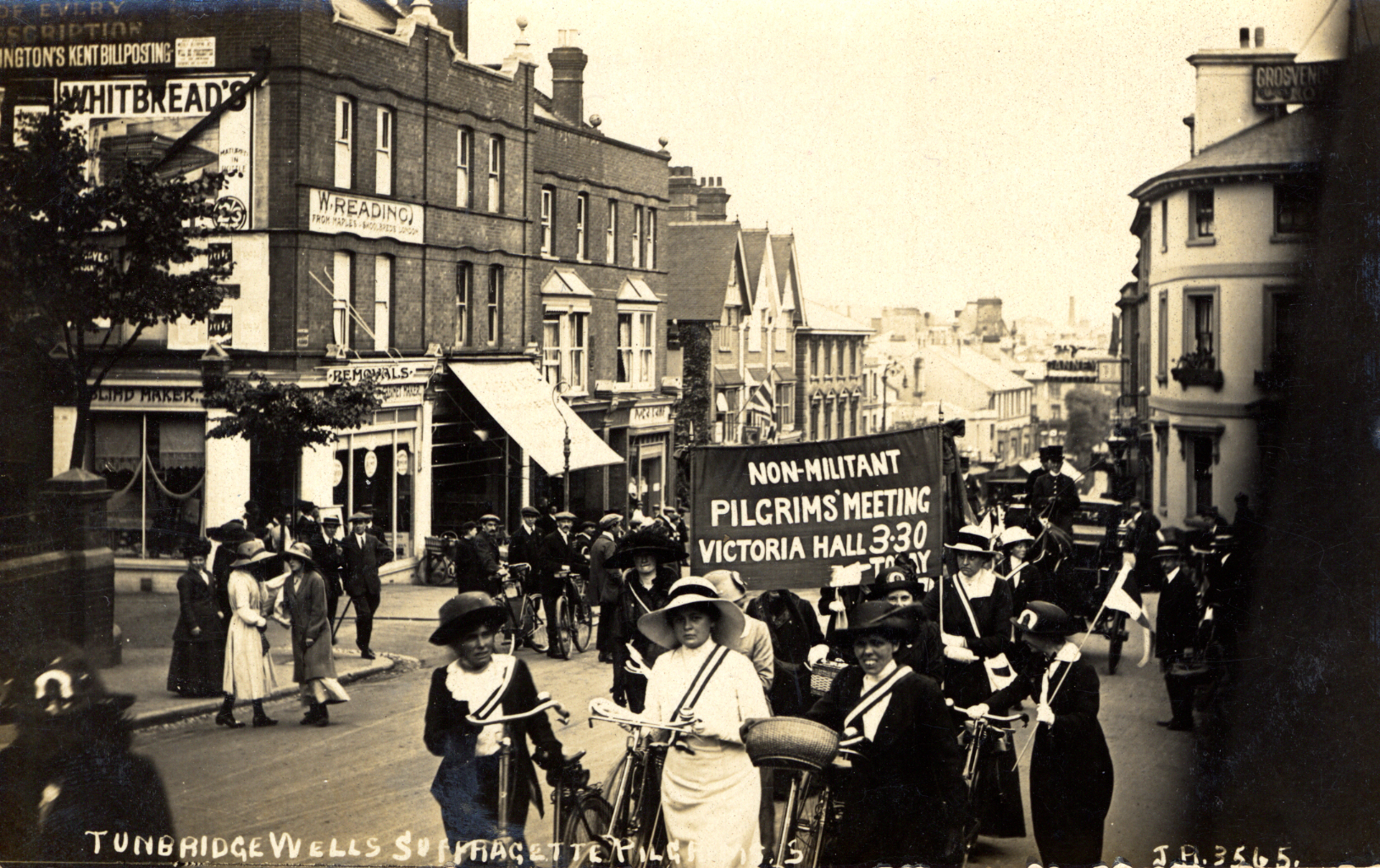
Great Pilgrimage, procession through Royal Tunbridge Wells

From 1908 Scott was an official of Tunbridge Wells' non-militant women's suffrage society which was affiliated to the National Union of Women's Suffrage Societies (NUWSS), and which had a shop and offices in Crescent Road, Tunbridge Wells. Amelia Scott took part in peaceful demonstrations for women's suffrage, once carrying a banner from the Thames Embankment in London to the Royal Albert Hall. In 1913 she became involved in the non-militant suffrage 'pilgrimage' to London organised by the newly formed Kentish Federation of Women's Suffrage Societies. She gave speeches en route, including at the Victoria Hall, Southborough. Her leaflet bag, emblazoned in the NUWSS colours of red and green, is now kept at the Women's Library.

Scott supported suffrage because she believed that women should play a part in changing the law, especially with regard to morality. In other words, the vote was not for her an end in itself, but a means to an end. She told her audience at the Victoria Hall, 'we women claim our right to political power in order that we may better carry it out.' Furthermore, she expressed feminine solidarity: 'the degradation of any woman is the degradation of all,' she claimed. Scott's feminism was thus rooted in her experience as a social activist as well as her religious faith. 'Men and women TOGETHER form humanity' she claimed, 'in God our Creator there is neither male nor female... the distinction is purely physical, not spiritual.'

== First World War ==
During the First World War the Tunbridge Wells NUWW – still with Amelia Scott as its Hon Secretary – got involved in establishing voluntary women police patrols in the town and in running canteens for soldiers billeted in the area. In 1915 at the request of a military commander, Scott and her helpers opened a laundry service for washing and mending soldiers' kits. At its height the laundry was dealing with up to 20,000 garments a week. Meanwhile, the former suffrage society offices were transformed into a depot for donations of clothing. After the war Amelia Scott attended a Buckingham Palace garden party for women war workers on account of the soldiers' laundry which she had managed from 1915 to 1918.

Soon after the outbreak of war, as an influx of refugees from Belgium came to Britain, Amelia and Louisa Scott both became members of the Tunbridge Wells committee set up to welcome and assist the refugees. The Scott sisters and the other ladies on the committee must have been generous with their help for the refugees since in 1916 they were all presented with souvenir album autographed by members of the Belgian 'colony' in Tunbridge Wells. The album presented to Amelia and Louisa jointly as 'Mesdemoiselles Scott' is preserved in the Women's Library in London. Amelia was also awarded the Golden Palm of the Order of the Crown of Belgium by the King of Belgium for her help to the refugees.

As well as the Armistice, 1918 saw the passage of the Representation of The People Act, which gave the parliamentary vote to some women. In December, these women got their first chance to vote in a general election and on polling day Amelia Scott took part in a procession of women through Tunbridge Wells to the Town Hall.

== Post-war ==
In 1918 the NUWW became the National Council of Women (NCW). Amelia Scott remained the local branch secretary and its members continued their active, local political campaigns. In addition, NCW women founded a Women's Citizens' Association, dedicated to the political education of newly enfranchised women. Amelia Scott was a leading member of this new organisation.

In 1919, Amelia Scott and her friend and colleague, Susan Power, became the first two women to be elected to the borough council of Royal Tunbridge Wells. Scott received almost 40 per cent of the votes cast in her ward. As a councillor she campaigned for the appointment of women police, for better housing and for the provision of municipal services such as a museum and library.

However Scott's main local, post-war campaign was for a maternity home, together with a hostel and day nursery for the children of widows, deserted wives and unmarried mothers. The project was intended as a thank offering for victory in the war. This was partially successful when in 1924 sufficient money had been raised to purchase two adjoining properties for the maternity home. By 1936 one-third of local mothers were delivered of their babies at the home and Scott was still a member of its committee when it was absorbed into the National Health Service in 1948.

== National work ==
Amelia Scott's influence was not restricted to the local area. She regularly participated at NCW Annual Conferences and served on its national executive. She also established a national committee of the NCW, called the Public Service Committee, and was its secretary for 17 years. An early campaign of the committee's was for safe lodging houses for women (see above). In 1919, when women were allowed to become Justices of the Peace (JPs) for the first time, the committee – previously just for women in local government – became the Public Service and Magistrates Committee (PSMC). Under its new name the committee - still convened by Scott - campaigned for better treatment of women in police cells and for the employment of women JPs in juvenile courts.

Amelia Scott corresponded with many of the leading figures of the NCW including Louise Creighton (founding president and wife of a Bishop of London) and she worked closely with Florence Ada Keynes on the PSMC. Her high-profile correspondents also included Beatrice Webb, Eleanor Rathbone MP, Millicent Fawcett (suffragist leader) and Clementine Churchill.

Amelia Scott's national work showed the same interest in the care of vulnerable women and children as her local work. In 1918, together with other interested parties, the NCW established the National Council for the Unmarried Mother and her Child (later the National Council for One Parent Families) and Amelia Scott was an early committee member. Unmarried mothers were, to say the least, a controversial cause in 1918, and her involvement reflects her care for those who were marginalised and stigmatised in society.

== Retirement ==
Around 1930 Amelia Scott retired from most of her public activities. That year Boards of Guardians were abolished and the following year she stepped down as branch NCW secretary. However, her retirement was only partial and by 1932 she was back in charge of a Tunbridge Wells soup kitchen, opened to help the rising numbers of unemployed. Moreover, she remained chairman of the hospital committee at Pembury. She also retained her interest in the care of refugees: in 1939 she signed a letter on behalf of the Tunbridge Wells Refugee Relief Committee appealing for help for refugees from Nazi Germany.

In the 1940s Amelia Scott wrote a memoir focused on the transformation of the old workhouse into a modern, almost National Health Service hospital (called Passing of the Great Dread), which was eventually published in parts in the journal of the Family Welfare Association (formerly the COS). She was fond of handicrafts, including needlework and weaving, and she hand-knitted articles for the Seamen's Mission. She retained her interest in the local hospital and its patients' welfare: only weeks before her death she sent some Christmas flowers to one of the hospital wards.
