= Sarah Reddish =

British trade unionist and suffragette

- Born: 3 October 1849; Westleigh, Lancashire, England
- Died: 19 February 1928 (aged 78); Farnworth, Lancashire, England
- Occupations: Trade worker; Suffragette; Trade unionist; Co-operator
- Years active: 1861–1921

Sarah Reddish (3 October 1849 – 19 February 1928) was a British trade unionist and suffragette, who was active in the co-operative movement. A supporter of women running for local elections as a springboard to gaining national voting rights, she ran for office on the Bolton School Board and was successful in her second attempt in 1899. She also ran for office as a Poor Law Guardian, and was successful, but was defeated in her attempt to become a member of the borough council. As a textile worker, Reddish knew first-hand the conditions and wages women experienced and joined unions, working as a paid organiser to help women improve their situations. She was both a socialist and a radical feminist, urging women's equality in the public sphere.

== Early life ==
Sarah Reddish was born in 1849 in Westleigh, Lancashire, England into a working-class family. Her father was a prominent member of Bolton Co-operative Society, serving as the honorary librarian and secretary of the society's Bolton branch. Leaving school at age eleven, Reddish began working at home, winding silk for her mother and neighbour's weavings.

== Career ==
In the 1860s, Reddish began working in a cotton mill as a reeler and winder. In addition to her work, she was required to provide assistance for those who were accidentally injured by the machinery. She eventually became foreman at a hosiery mill.

== Co-operation ==
In 1879, Reddish joined the Bolton Co-operative Society and developed a reputation in both local and national organisations. By 1886, she was president of the Bolton Women's Co-operative Guild and served in that capacity until 1906. Between 1889 and 1891 and then again between 1895 and 1898, Reddish was elected to serve on the central committee of the Guild. In the intervening years, from 1893 to 1895 she was appointed to be regional organiser of northern England's Women's Co-operative Guild, as its first paid organiser. Reddish served as national president of the Guild in 1897. Reddish brought suffrage speakers into the organisational meetings and campaigned for wage improvements of women employees.

== Suffrage ==
As a proponent of women holding local offices, believing that would help in their claim for the larger vote, she ran as a member of the Bolton School Board in 1897 but was defeated. When a board member resigned in 1899, she expected to be appointed to fill the term based on the custom that the defeated candidate who had received the most votes in the prior election filled unexpired terms. Though the board refused to appoint her because she was a woman, Reddish ran successfully later that year for the post. She continued serving until at least 1907.

Reddish joined the Clarion Movement and the Independent Labour Party in 1896, travelling with the first women's Clarion van tour. The tours allowed Reddish to use her public-speaking skills at public meetings where women discussed the value of socialism. Two years later when the Independent Labour Party fused with the Social Democratic Party, Reddish urged members to join the Bolton Socialist Party. As with her politics, Reddish believed in equality throughout the public sphere for women. She urged in her union reports for men to become more active in home duties and for women to develop their civic roles. She belonged to that group of radical feminists who pushed for full equality, classifying their sex as a disability.

By 1899, her concern for providing support for women workers led her to become an organiser for the Women's Trade Union League. Her focus with the Trade Union League was to improve both wages and conditions for working women. Between 1900 and 1901, Reddish helped circulate petitions for women's voting rights among factory workers and she was the one chosen to present the final compiled petition, which contained nearly 30,000 signatures, to Parliament. The campaign spurred wool workers in Yorkshire, as well as cotton and silk workers from north Cheshire to hold a similar petition drive. Reddish pushed the Guild to support enfranchisement and in 1904 at its annual conference, the Women's Co-operative Guild voted in favour of backing the pending franchise bill. She served as an organiser for the North of England Society for Women's Suffrage between 1903 and 1905 and occasionally worked as a paid organiser for the National Union of Women's Suffrage Societies in London.

In 1903, Reddish became a founding member of the Lancashire and Cheshire Women Textile and Other Workers Representation Committee, along with Selina Cooper, Sarah Dickenson, Eva Gore-Booth and Esther Roper. The group, for which she would later serve as treasurer, was formed evaluate parliamentary candidates and select those who would fight for voting rights of women workers. She wrote articles, including Women and County Borough Councils: a Claim for Eligibility (1903) and Women and the Franchise: A Claim for Its Extension (1904) which put forward her views and were distributed in local newspapers. In 1905, Reddish ran for office as a Poor Law Guardian, having served on the committee of the Bolton Association for the Return of Women as Poor Law Guardians since 1897. She won the election and served as a Guardian until 1921. Reddish ran for borough council for the Halliwell Ward of Bolton in 1907, though she was unsuccessful. Later that same year, she went to Ghent and Brussels to study child care initiatives being launched in Belgium and upon her return, established the School for Mothers in Bolton. In 1911, she became president of the Manchester and Salford Women's Trade Society. She served as a delegate to the 1915 Women's International League for Peace and Freedom conference in The Hague and then in 1919 Reddish organised the Bolton Women's Citizens Association. In the 1920s, illness forced her to curtail her activism.

Reddish died on 19 February 1928 at Townleys Hospital of Farnworth, Lancashire and was buried in the Heaton Cemetery on Bolton Wood Road.

== Posthumous recognition ==
Her name and picture (and those of 58 other women's suffrage supporters) are on the plinth of the statue of Millicent Fawcett in Parliament Square, London, unveiled in 2018.
