= Ada Nield Chew =

British socialist and suffragist (1870–1945)

- Born: Ada Nield; 28 January 1870; Talke, Staffordshire, England
- Died: 27 December 1945 (aged 75); Burnley, Lancashire, England
- Resting place: Rochdale Cemetery, Greater Manchester, England
- Occupations: Suffragist, social activist, writer
- Organization(s): National Union of Women's Suffrage Societies (NUWSS), Women's Trade Union League
- Political party: Independent Labour Party
- Spouse: George Chew (m. 1897–1940) his death

Ada Nield Chew (28 January 1870 – 27 December 1945) was a British campaigning socialist, writer and suffragist. Her name is on the plinth of Millicent Fawcett's statue in Parliament Square, London.

== Early life ==
Nield was born on a White Hall Farm,Talke o' the Hill, near Butt Lane in north Staffordshire on 28 January 1870, daughter of brick maker Willam Nield and Jane (née Hammond) Nield. She was the second child and eldest daughter of 13 children.

Her only sister had epilepsy, and Nield left school aged 11 to help her mother take care of the house, look after the family and to support her through her constant childbearing. Nield's childhood experiences shaped her views that, for women to lead individual lives and gain economic independence, housework and childcare should become professionalised.

== Career ==
When she was in her 20s she worked in a shop in Nantwich then as a tailoress in the Compton Bros clothing factory in Crewe, Cheshire. She was dismissed from her factory job after writing a series of letters to the Crewe Chronicle in 1894 under the pseudonym "A Crewe Factory Girl" which criticised working conditions for women and girls in the factory. She highlighted issues such as the unfairness by which work was allocated and the practice of charging workers for their tea breaks and the materials they required to do their work. The factory employed 400 women and 100 men but paid the women a fraction of the men's wages for their roles in making uniforms for soldiers, police and railway workers. She argued for a living wage for women rather than a "lingering, dying wage".

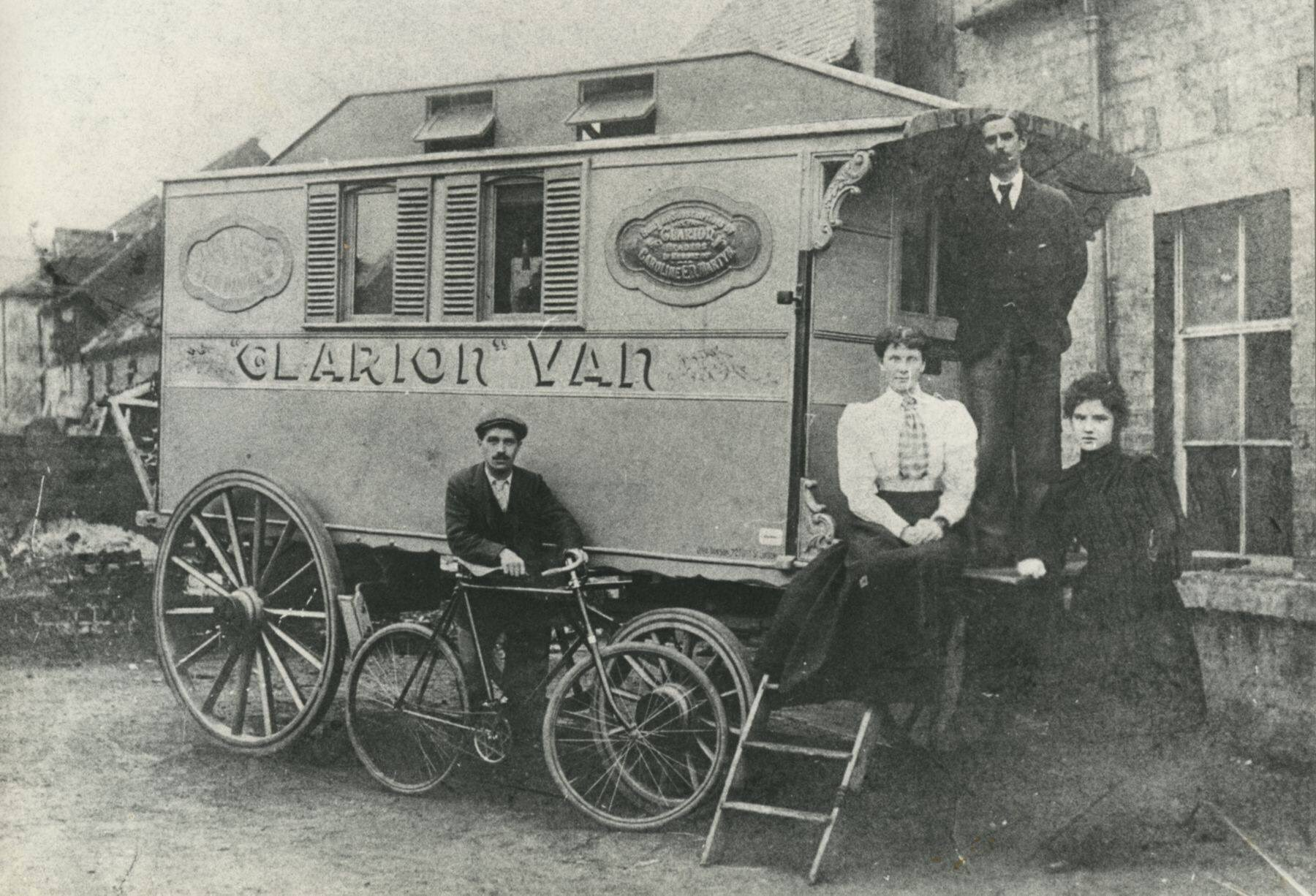
Nield spoke to visitors attracted to the Clarion Vans that started to tour in 1896

Her letters had attracted the attention of the Independent Labour Party (ILP), who offered her employment if her identity as the Crewe Factory Girl was discovered. When her identity was uncovered, she became active in the ILP. By the end of the year she had been elected as a Nantwich Poor Law Guardian (one of the first working-class female Guardians) and was working with the local Trades Council. In 1896, she toured the north-east of England in the Clarion Van organised by Julia Dawson to publicise the ILP's policies.

In 1897, she married George Chew, another ILP organiser. Their daughter (and only child), Doris, was born in the following year. Chew then became an organiser for the Women's Trade Union League in 1900, working alongside Mary Macarthur, and took her daughter along with her on her campaigning work.

In the years leading up to the First World War, Chew became an active supporter of the movement for women's suffrage. According to her daughter, Chew as a working class woman sometimes felt patronised by the middle-class leadership of the movement. This was reflected in a lively correspondence with Christabel Pankhurst in the pages of The Clarion during 1904. In the provinces she with Selina Cooper and Margaret Aldersley were experienced labour activists in Lancashire. Chew became a member of the National Union of Women's Suffrage Societies (NUWSS) and worked for this body as an organiser from 1911 to 1914. The main focus of her work was in winning support for the cause through contacts in the labour movement, but she also wrote for Freewoman, the Englishwoman and the NUWSS paper Common Cause.

During the First World War, Chew adopted a pacifist stance and was active in the Manchester branch of the Women's International League for Peace and Freedom and other anti-war organisations.

After the end of the war, and the achievement of women's suffrage in 1918, Chew withdrew from any major involvement in politics, but still worked to improve the working conditions, diet and health of working-class women. She focused on building up Chew & Co., the mail-order drapery business which she founded, with premises in Chapel Street, Salford. She also ran a health food store, which developed out of her vegetarianism. She retired from the business in 1930 and undertook a round-the-world tour in 1935.

Her sister was committed to the Cheshire County Asylum, where she died in the 1920s. Her husband died in 1940, and Chew died on 27 December 1945 in Burnley, Lancashire. She was cremated and her ashes scattered on the Rose Lawn at Rochdale Cemetery. She was survived by her daughter, Doris, who later edited a selection of her writings together with a brief biography.

== Archives ==
An oral history interview between Brian Harrison and Doris Nield Chew, about her mother, Ada, is held by The Women's Library, now housed at The British Library of Political and Economic Science, and available online. It is one of over 200 interviews made between 1974 and 1981 as part of Oral Evidence on the Suffragette and Suffragist Movements: the Brian Harrison interviews.

== Posthumous recognition ==
Ada Nield Chew's daughter, Doris Nield Chew, published a collection of her writings in 1982. This was subsequently adapted by Alan Plater for the television drama 'The Clarion Van', first broadcast 5 July 1983 as an episode of the Granada series Women. In this production, Ada Nield Chew was played by Diane Fletcher.

Ada Nield Chew's name and picture (and those of 58 other women's suffrage supporters) are on the plinth of the statue of Millicent Fawcett in Parliament Square, London, unveiled in 2018.

The 'Statue for Ada' campaign, run by Cheshire Women's Collaboration, has appointed artist Hazel Reeves to sculpt Ada Nield Chew. It will be cast in bronze and installed in Crewe.

== See also ==
- History of feminism
- List of suffragists and suffragettes
- National Union of Women's Suffrage Societies
- Women's suffrage in the United Kingdom
- List of peace activists
