= Edward S. Harper =

Edward Samuel Harper
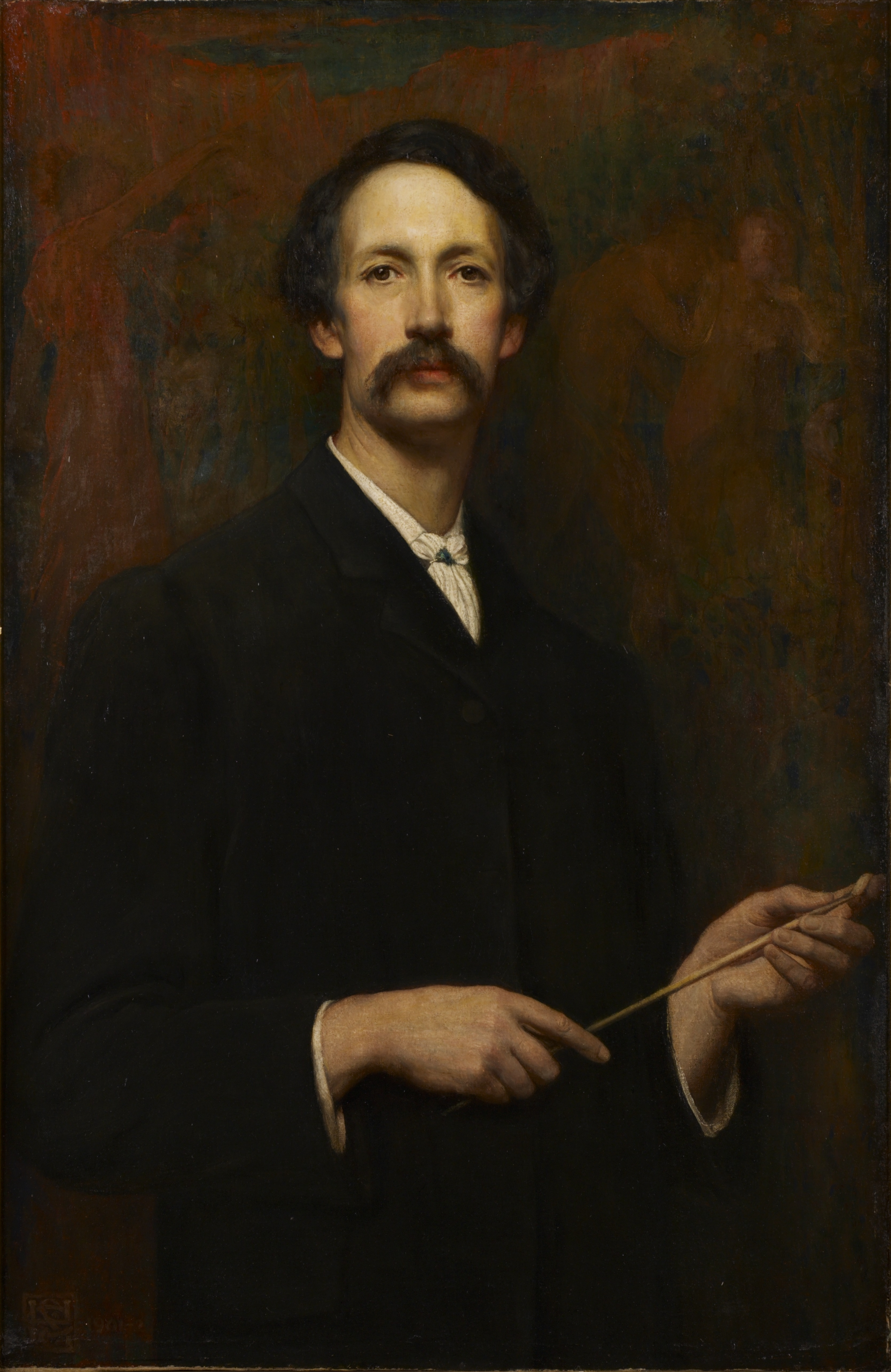
- Self-portrait, c. 1902
- Born: 1854; Handsworth, Staffordshire, England
- Died: 7 February 1941; Harborne, Birmingham, England
- Occupations: Painter; Jeweller; Teacher

Edward Samuel Harper (1854 – 7 February 1941) was the President of the Royal Birmingham Society of Artists from 1935 to 1938. He was known as a jeweller and taught drawing and painting at Birmingham School of Art for a period of 40 years.

Harper was born in Handsworth (then in Staffordshire) and died in Harborne. On 12 March 1881 he was elected an associate member of the Royal Birmingham Society of Artists.
