= The Common Cause (newspaper) =

United Kingdom (1909–1920)

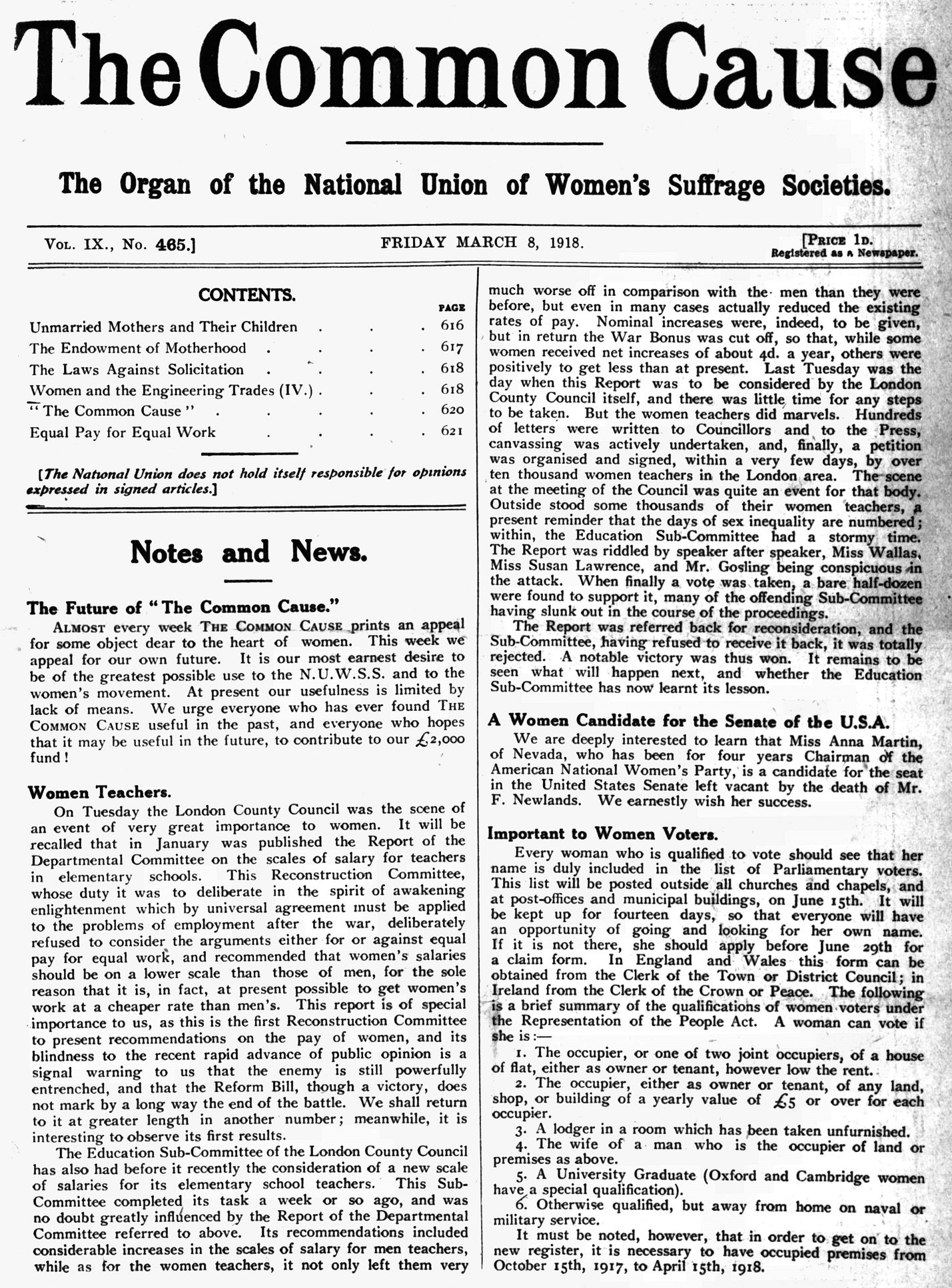
- Edition of The Common Cause for Friday, 8 March 1918
- Type: Weekly newspaper
- Founder: Margaret Ashton
- Publisher: Common Cause Publishing Co. Ltd.
- Editor: Helena Swanwick, Clementina Black, Maude Royden and Ray Strachey
- Founded: 15 April 1909 as The Common Cause of Humanity, then renamed to The Common Cause
- Ceased publication: 30 January 1920 (replaced by The Women's Leader)
- Political alignment: Suffragist
- Language: English
- Headquarters: Manchester

The Common Cause was a weekly publication that supported the National Union of Women's Suffrage Societies (NUWSS), was first published on 15 April 1909 and was mainly financed by Margaret Ashton. Its last issue was published on Friday, 30 January 1920, in which it announced its successor The Woman's Leader.

== History ==
In 1908, the Manchester councillor Margaret Ashton sold her house in Didsbury to fund the creation of a newspaper, which was eventually founded in an office in Manchester in 1912. The intention was that it would represent the policies of and publish news from the NUWSS, but for legal reasons it could not be an organ of the NUWSS . Instead The Common Cause Publishing Co. Ltd was founded with an initial capital of £2,000 to publish the new paper.

Its first editor was Helena Swanwick, who chose the name "Common Cause" because she believed that humanity was "bi-sexual", in other words that there were not "women's causes" or "men's causes". She resigned in June 1912, because of the policy of the NUWSS not to criticise the Women's Social and Political Union (WSPU), the main suffragette organisation, because she felt its militancy was hindering the progress of women's suffrage and regarding them as "the greatest danger we have". She wrote to C. P. Scott on 19 July 1912, saying: "I have much sympathy for feminine rebellion. For their claptrap and dishonesty, for their persecution and terrorism, I have loathing."

From 1912 to 1913, Clementina Black was editor. In April 1913, Maude Royden, who had been a regular contributor to the paper, took up the post of editor which she held until 1914. Its last editor was Ray Strachey, who became editor after the end of the First World War.

== See also ==
- List of British suffragists and suffragettes
- List of women's suffrage publications
