= Manchester Society for Women's Suffrage =

The Manchester Society for Women's Suffrage, whose aim was to obtain the same rights for women to vote for Members of Parliament as those granted to men, was formed at a meeting in Manchester in January 1867. Elizabeth Wolstenholme claimed it had begun in 1865. Lydia Becker was its secretary from February 1867 and Richard Pankhurst was a member of its committee. Founding members of the society were Ursula Mellor Bright and Jacob Bright.

The society underwent several name changes as it affiliated with other women's suffrage organisations. It became the Manchester National Society for Women's Suffrage (MNSWS) in November 1867 when it joined London and Edinburgh societies in the National Society for Women's Suffrage. In 1897, with about 500 other suffrage societies, the MNSWS joined the National Union of Women's Suffrage Societies (NUWSS) and changed its name to the North of England Society for Women's Suffrage and in 1911 it became the Manchester Society for Women's Suffrage, part of the Manchester District Federation of the NUWSS.

The society opened an office at 28 Jackson's Row in 1868 and in 1887 moved to premises in John Dalton Street.
