= Selina Cooper =

Cornish suffragist

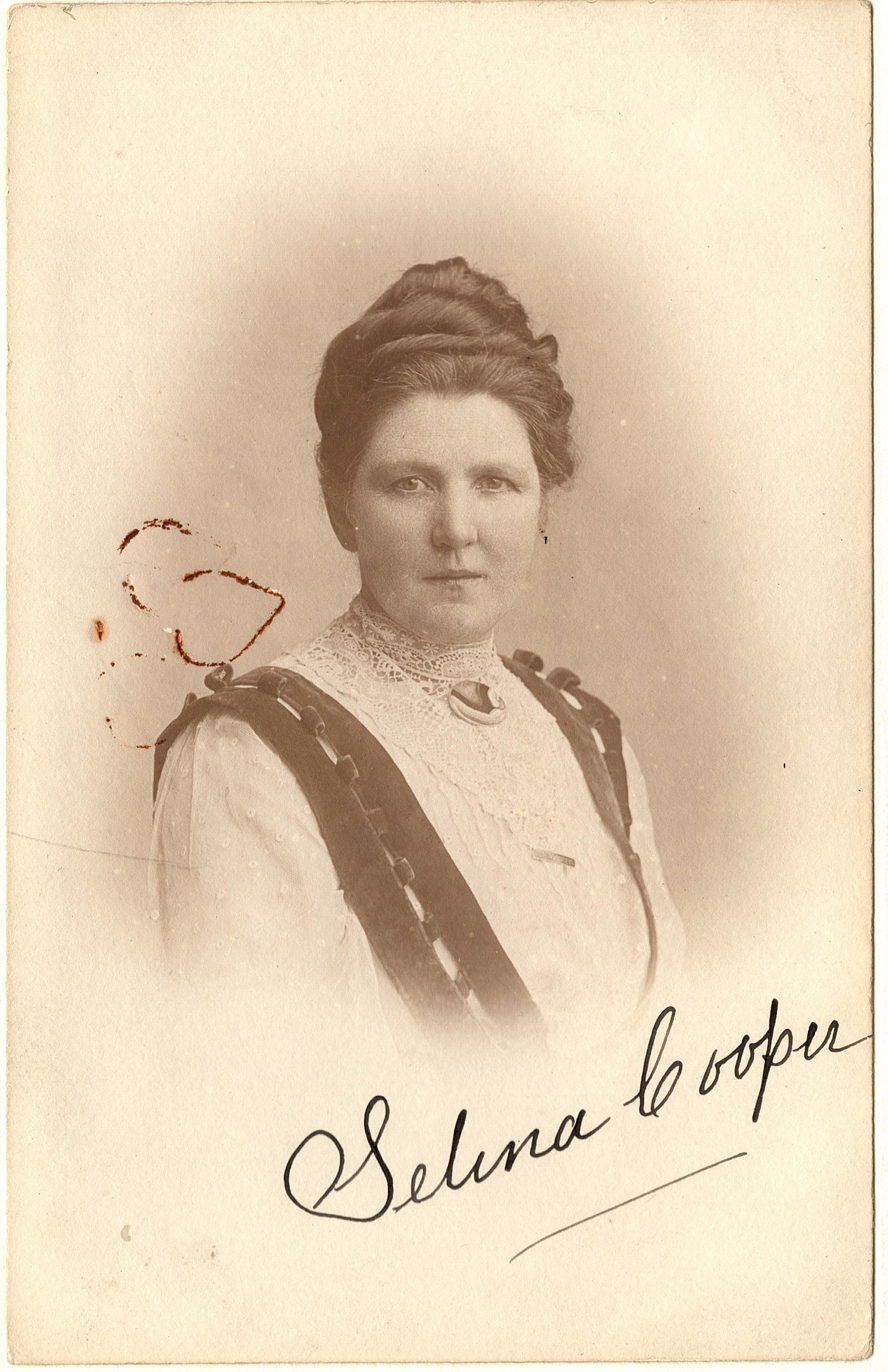
- Born: 4 December 1864; Callington, Cornwall, England
- Died: 11 November 1946 (aged 81)
- Occupations: suffragist and the first woman to represent the Independent Labour Party (ILP)
- Organisation(s): Women's Co-operative Guild, North of England Society for Women's Suffrage
- Political party: Social Democratic Federation
- Other political affiliations: Independent Labour Party

Selina Jane Cooper (née Coombe; 4 December 1864 – 11 November 1946) was an English suffragist and the first woman to represent the Independent Labour Party (ILP) in 1901 when she was elected as a Poor Law Guardian.

== Early life ==
Selina Cooper was born Selina Coombe in Callington, Cornwall, in 1864, the sixth of seven surviving children of Charles Coombe, a railway labourer who later became a railway subcontractor, and Jane Coombe (née Uren), a dressmaker. After her father died of typhoid fever in 1876 while working on a job), she moved to Barnoldswick. At the age of 12, she began working in the local textile mills and left school at 13 to work full-time there.

== Trade union and political activities ==
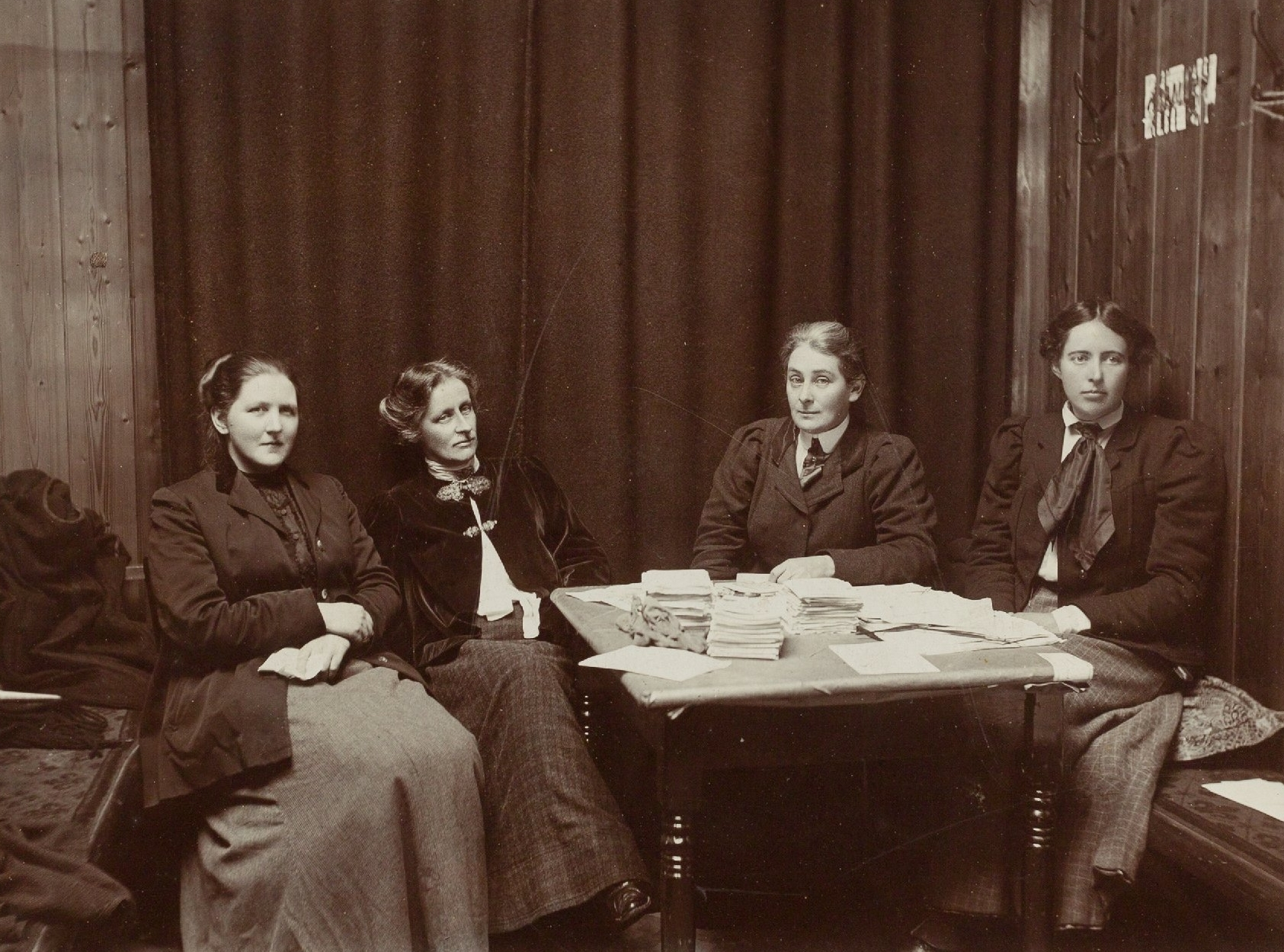
Cooper, Ray Strachey, Edith Palliser and EM Gardner. Four suffragists during the Mid Devon bi-election c. 1907/1908

Cooper became active in trade union activities and took practical courses in laundry, hygiene and first aid and became a member of the Barnoldswick St John's Ambulance Committee in 1895. She was an early member of the Nelson Social Democratic Federation (SDF), and later founded a branch of the party in Brierfield. She joined the Women's Co-operative Guild in 1897 and the North of England Society for Women's Suffrage in 1900.

In 1901, Cooper was elected to the Board of Guardians, as a joint SDF-ILP candidate. She became frustrated with the SDF's lack of interest in the suffrage movement, and moved away from the party, becoming a full-time organiser for the suffrage movement. In 1910 she was chosen to be one of four women to present the case for women's suffrage to H. H. Asquith, who was then Prime Minister. She and Ada Nield Chew and Margaret Aldersley were experienced labour activists in Lancashire.

During the First World War Cooper developed the first ever Maternity Centre in Nelson, Lancashire. She was later elected to the town council and went on to become a local magistrate. She resigned from the Labour Party in the 1930s due to her belief that the party did not take a strong enough line against fascism.

== Recognition ==
Selina Cooper's house at 59 St Mary's Street, Nelson, is marked with a heritage blue plaque. In 2015, she was the subject of a play by the Function Factory theatre in Nelson titled "Hard-Faced Woman".
