= National Union of Women's Suffrage Societies =

Organisation of women's suffrage societies in the United Kingdom

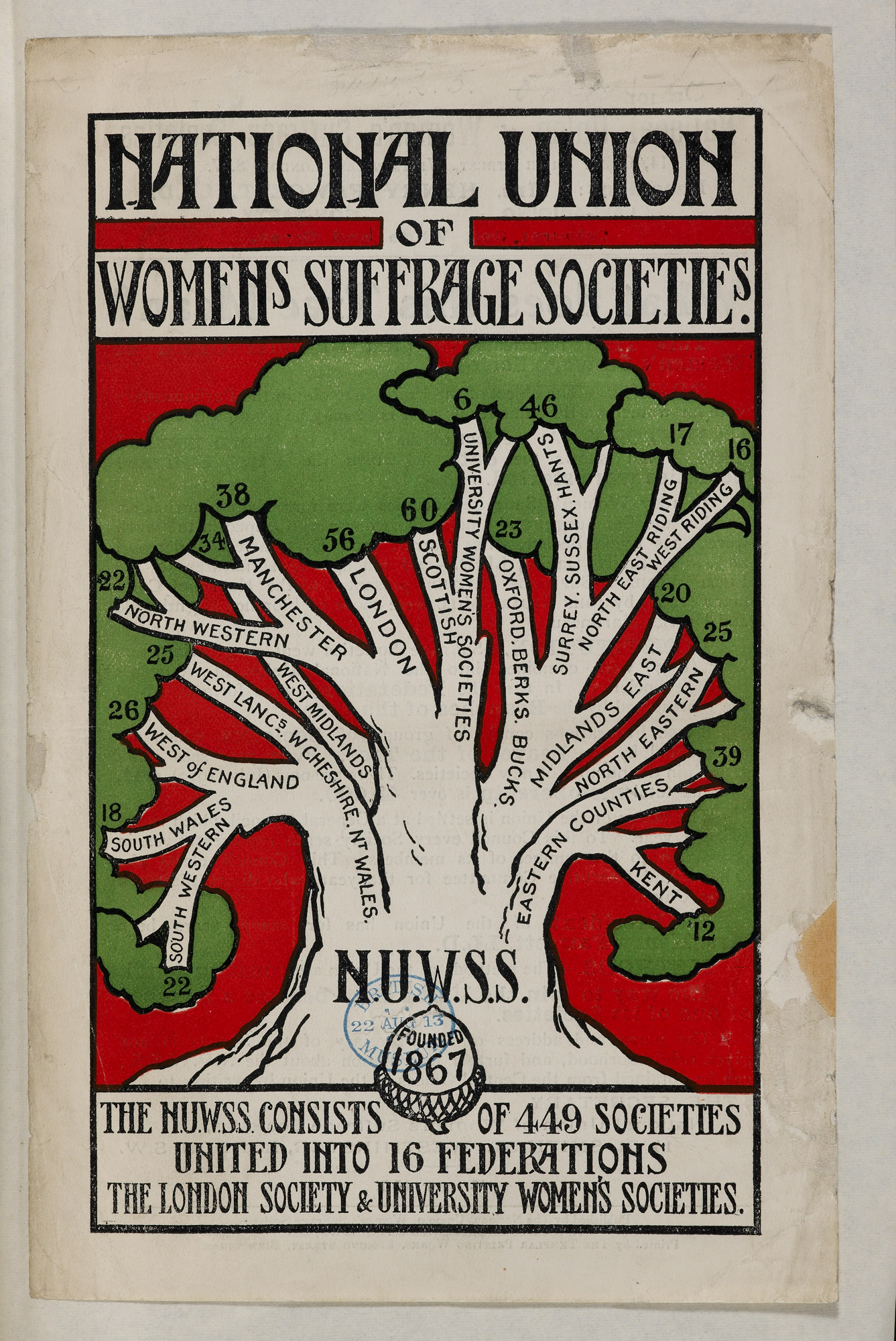
- Predecessor: National Central Society for Women's Suffrage and the Central Committee of the National Society for Women's Suffrage
- Successor: National Union of Societies for Equal Citizenship
- Formation: 14 October 1897
- Dissolved: 1919
- Headquarters: 22 Great Smith Street, Westminster
- Leader: Millicent Fawcett

The National Union of Women Suffrage Societies (NUWSS), also known as the suffragists (not to be confused with the suffragettes) was an organisation founded in 1897 of women's suffrage societies around the United Kingdom. In March 1919 it was renamed the National Union of Societies for Equal Citizenship.

== Formation and campaign ==
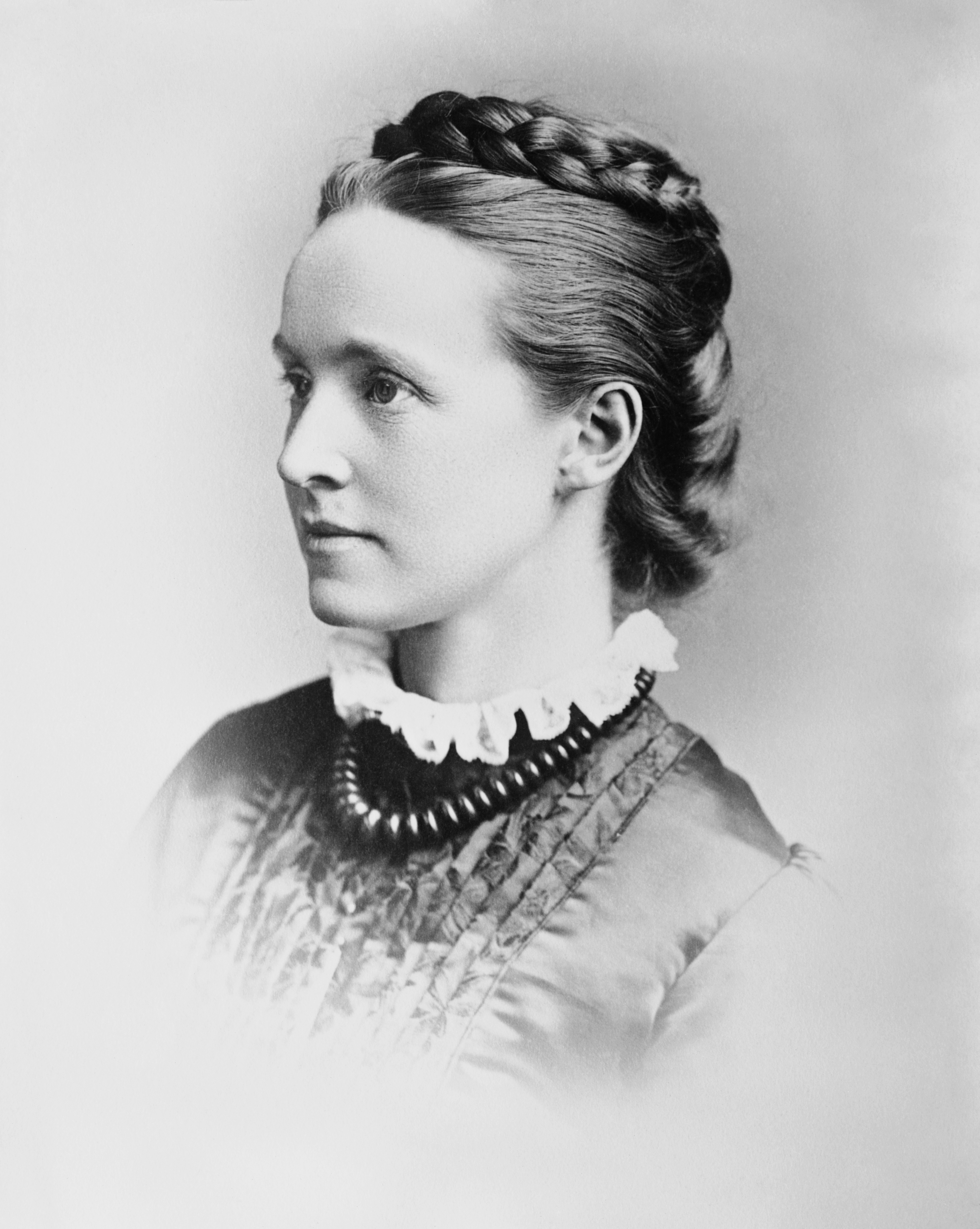
Millicent Fawcett

On 16 October 1896 the leaders of women's suffrage organisations from across Britain met in Birmingham to discuss merging their individual societies into a single organisation. The NUWSS was formally constituted on 14 October 1897 by the merger of the National Central Society for Women's Suffrage and the Central Committee of the National Society for Women's Suffrage, the groups having originally split in 1888.

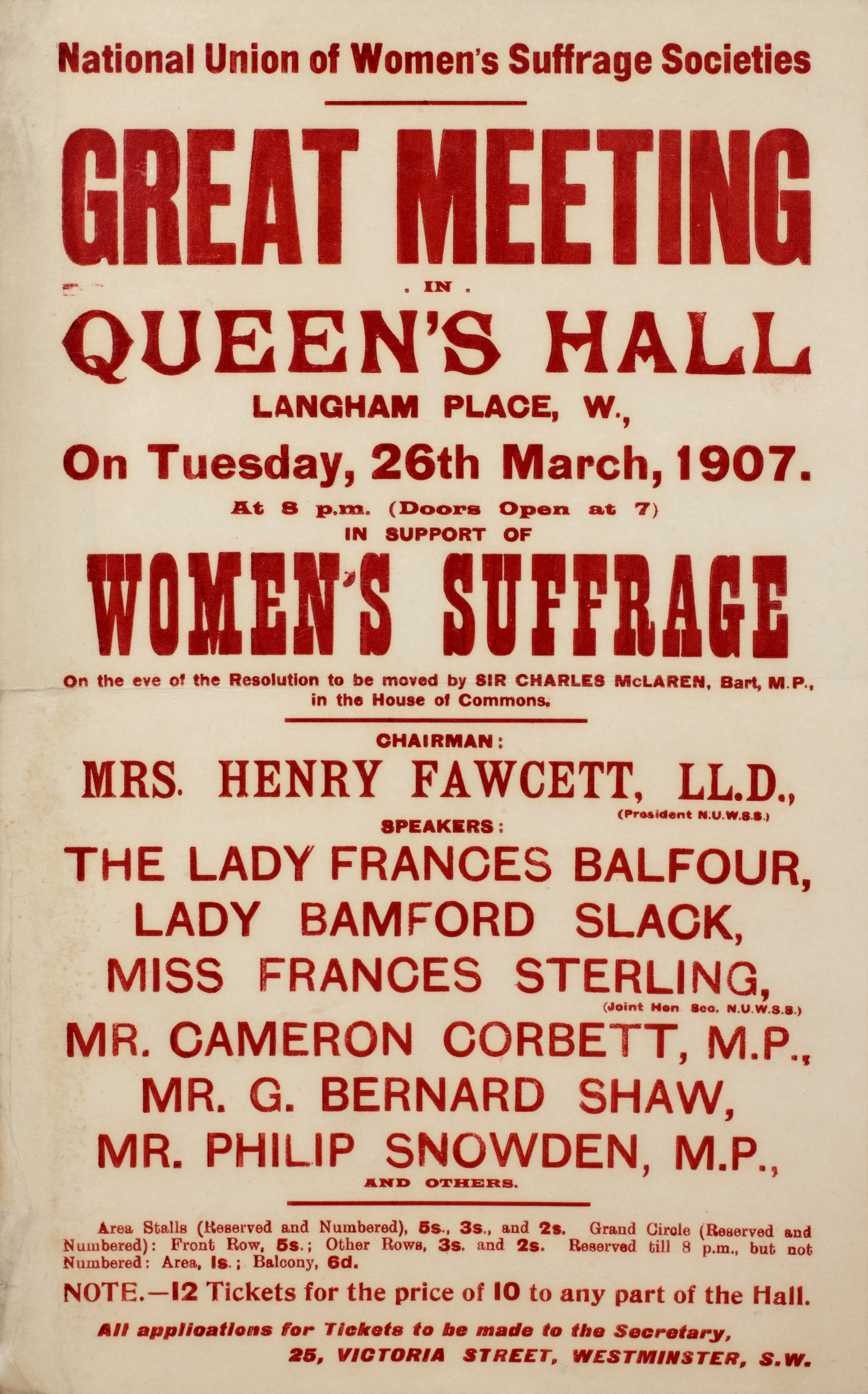

The groups united under the leadership of Millicent Fawcett, who was the president of the society for over twenty years (1898–1919). Local societies were affiliated as members of the NUWSS, but had a large degree of autonomy. There were 16 affiliates in 1903. The NUWSS admitted men to the organisation, but leaders and decision makers were all women.

The organisation was democratic and non-militant, aiming to achieve women's suffrage through peaceful and legal means, in particular by introducing Parliamentary Bills and holding meetings to explain and promote their aims. Its aim was phrased as being "to obtain the parliamentary franchise on the same terms as it is, or may be, granted to men." At the time of the NUWSS's formation, property qualifications were required for men to vote, so the NUWSS stance was controversial among labour and socialist movements.

In 1903, the Women's Social and Political Union (WSPU, the "suffragettes"), who wished to undertake more militant action, split from the NUWSS under the leadership of Emmeline Pankhurst and her daughter Christabel Pankhurst. Despite the split by the WSPU, the NUWSS continued to grow, and by 1914 it had branches throughout the country, with approximately 54,000 members. By February 1913, it had spent £60,000 on meetings and propaganda. Many, but by no means all, of the members were middle class, and some were working class.

Until 1906, the NUWSS focused on lobbying Parliament and supporting Bills for women's enfranchisement. For the 1906 general election, the group formed committees in each constituency to persuade local parties to select pro-suffrage candidates, with 415 pledges made by candidates. The NUWSS organized its first large, open-air procession which came to be known as the Mud March on 9 February 1907.

In April 1909 the NUWSS established its own journal, The Common Cause, edited by Helen Swanwick. It mainly financed by Margaret Ashton, who sold her house in Didsbury to raise funds.

By 1910, suffragists of the NUWSS were becoming sceptical about focusing on petitioning a parliament of men, with a 1910 issue of the Common Cause stating that: 'We have left off petitioning, because we were sick of it. The "right" to petition is really not unlike the "right" to use a telephone which has been disconnected." However, Fawcett said in a speech in 1911 that their movement was "like a glacier; slow moving but unstoppable".

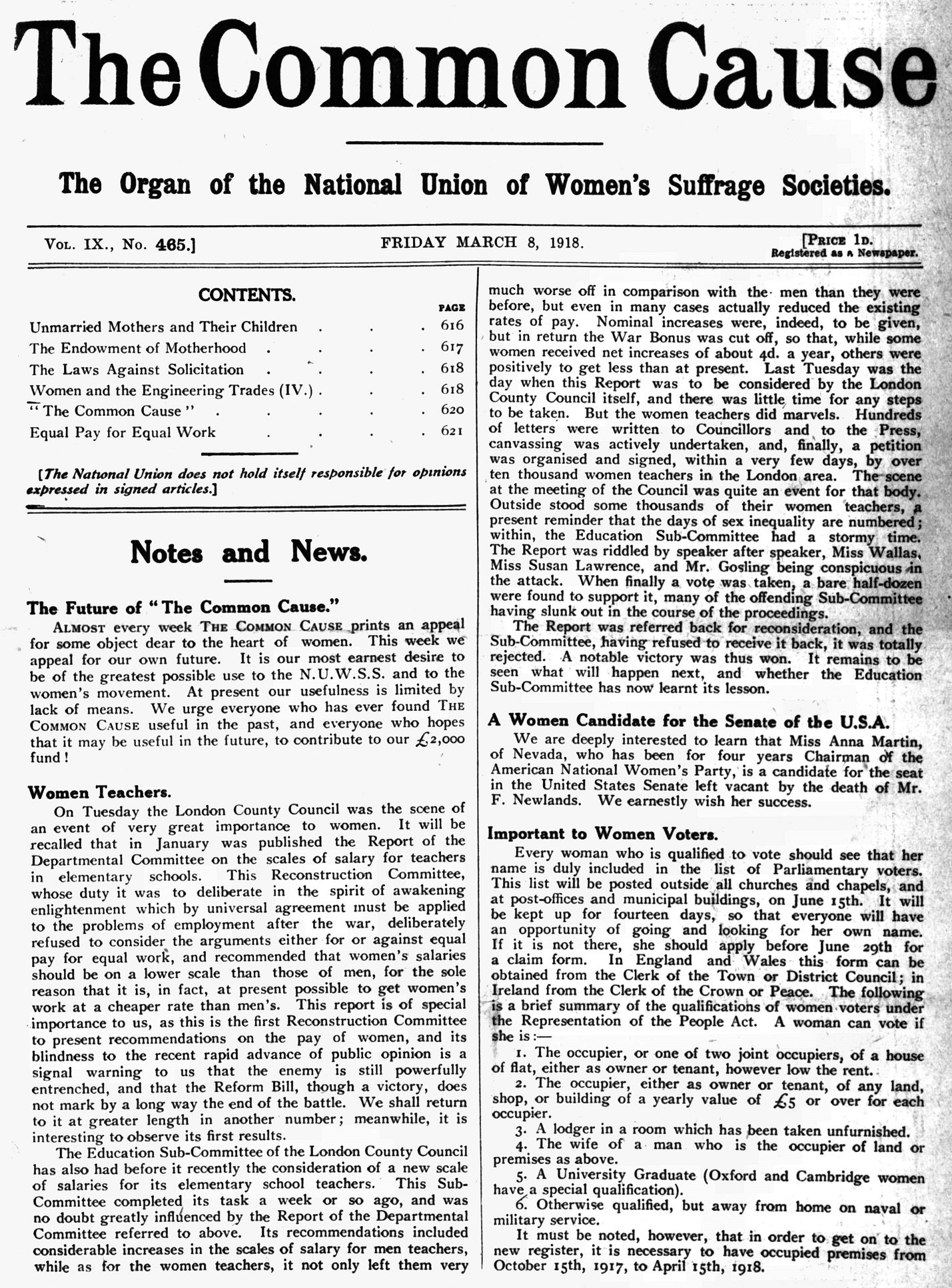
No 465 of The Common Cause, 1918

In 1913 the NUWSS organised a pilgrimage to London, initiated by Katherine Harley, younger sister of suffragist Charlotte Despard. The pilgrimage was disciplined and law abiding and was intended to be in contrast to the militancy of the suffragettes. It culminated in a rally of 50,000 people in Hyde Park on 26 July 1913, with the hope of Asquith receiving a deputation. This was successful and Asquith received a deputation on 8 August, the first suffrage deputation since November 1911, but to the disappointment of those involved it did not result in any change to government policy. Helen Fraser, Gwen Coleman and Mary Stocks (May 1974 interview) all spoke about the procession in suffrage interviews given to Brian Harrison. The NUWSS headquarters were at 22 Great Smith Street, Westminster, London from 1910 to 1918.

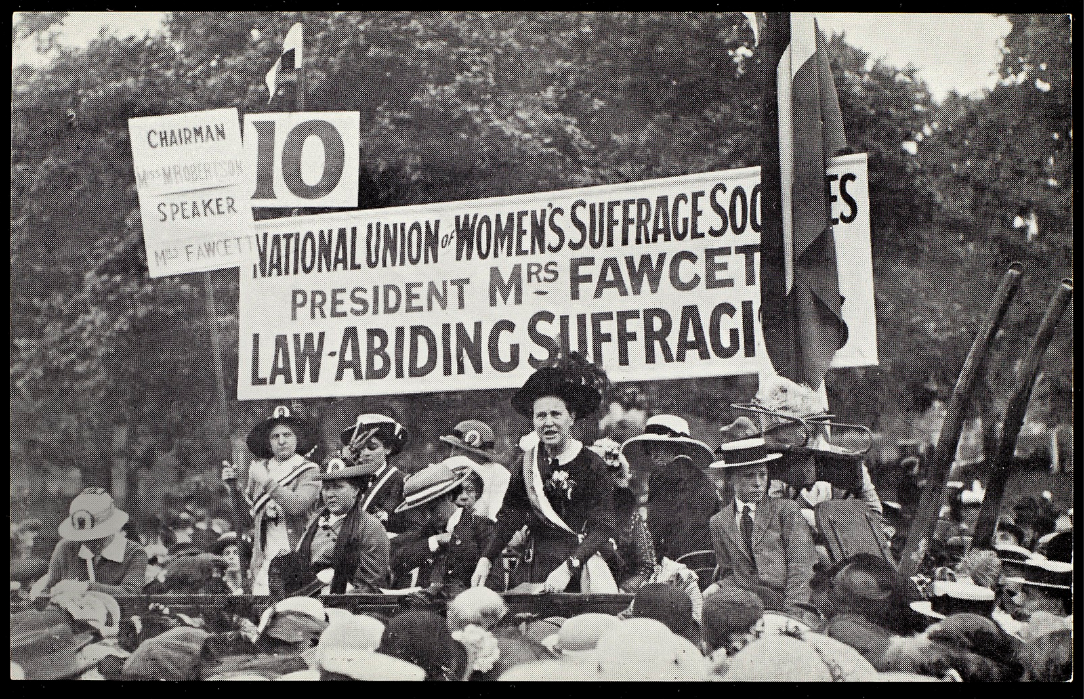
Fawcett during the "Suffrage Pilgrimage" at Hyde Park in 1913

== Political bias ==
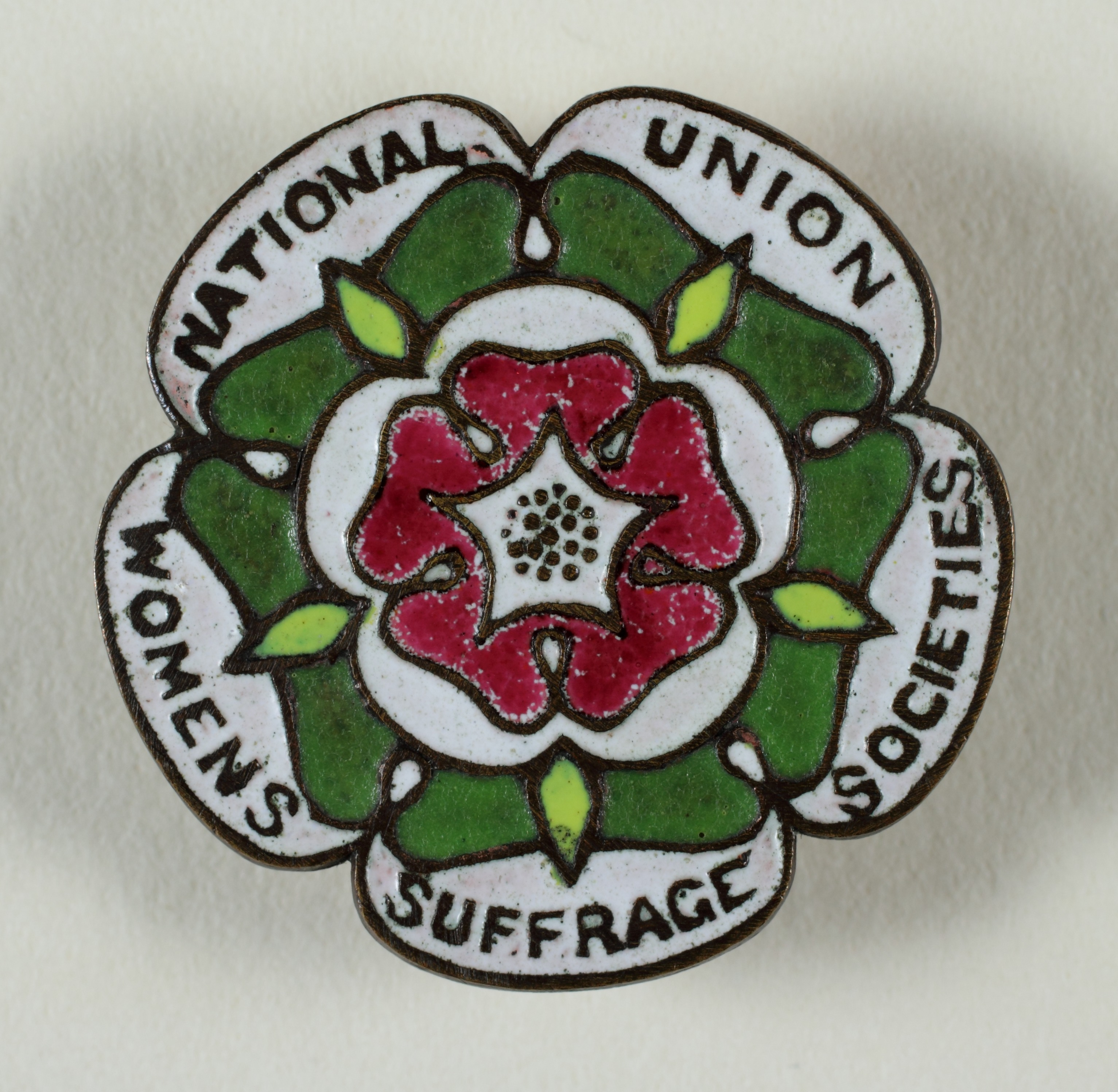
Campaigning badge

Up to 17 July 1912 the NUWSS was not allied with any party, but campaigned in support of individual election candidates who supported votes for women. In parliament, the Conciliation Bill of 1911 helped to change this position. The bill had majority support but was frustrated by insufficient time being given to pass it. The Liberal government relied on the nationalist Irish Parliamentary Party for a majority and was insistent that time was given instead to the passage of another Irish Home Rule bill and the Unionist Speaker, Sir James Lowther, opposed votes for women. Consequently, it did not become law.

Labour from 1903 was tied into an alliance with the Liberals and its leadership was divided on the issue of female emancipation. However, the 1913 party conference agreed to oppose any franchise bill that did not include extension of the franchise for women after a suffragist campaign in the north west of England effectively changed party opinion. The party consistently supported women's suffrage in the years before the war.

Fawcett, a Liberal, became infuriated with that party's delaying tactics and helped Labour candidates against Liberals at election time. In 1912 the NUWSS established the Election Fighting Fund committee (EFF) headed by Catherine Marshall. The committee backed Labour and in 1913–14 the EFF intervened in four by-elections and although Labour won none, the Liberals lost two.

The NUWSS, by allying itself with Labour, attempted to put pressure on the Liberals, because the Liberals' political future depended on Labour remaining weak.

== NUWSS during World War I ==
The NUWSS was split between the majority that supported war and the minority that opposed it. Fawcett resisted attempts by internationalist members to use the NUWSS to stop the war and tried to avoid fragmentation in the organisation.

In April 1915, Aletta Jacobs, a suffragist in the Netherlands, invited suffrage members from around the world to an International Congress of Women in The Hague. This caused some members, such as Catherine Marshall, Agnes Maude Royden and journal editor Helen Swanwick, to resign from the NUWSS.

During the war, the NUWSS focused on relief work rather than prioritising campaigning for enfranchisement whilst votes for women was not on the political agenda. It set up an employment register so that the jobs of those who were serving could be filled. The NUWSS financed women's hospital units, employing only female doctors and nurses, which served during World War I in France, such as the Scottish Women's Hospitals for Foreign Service (SWH).

The NUWSS supported the women's suffrage bill agreed by a Speaker's Conference even though it did not grant the equal suffrage for which the organisation had campaigned.

== Activities after World War I ==
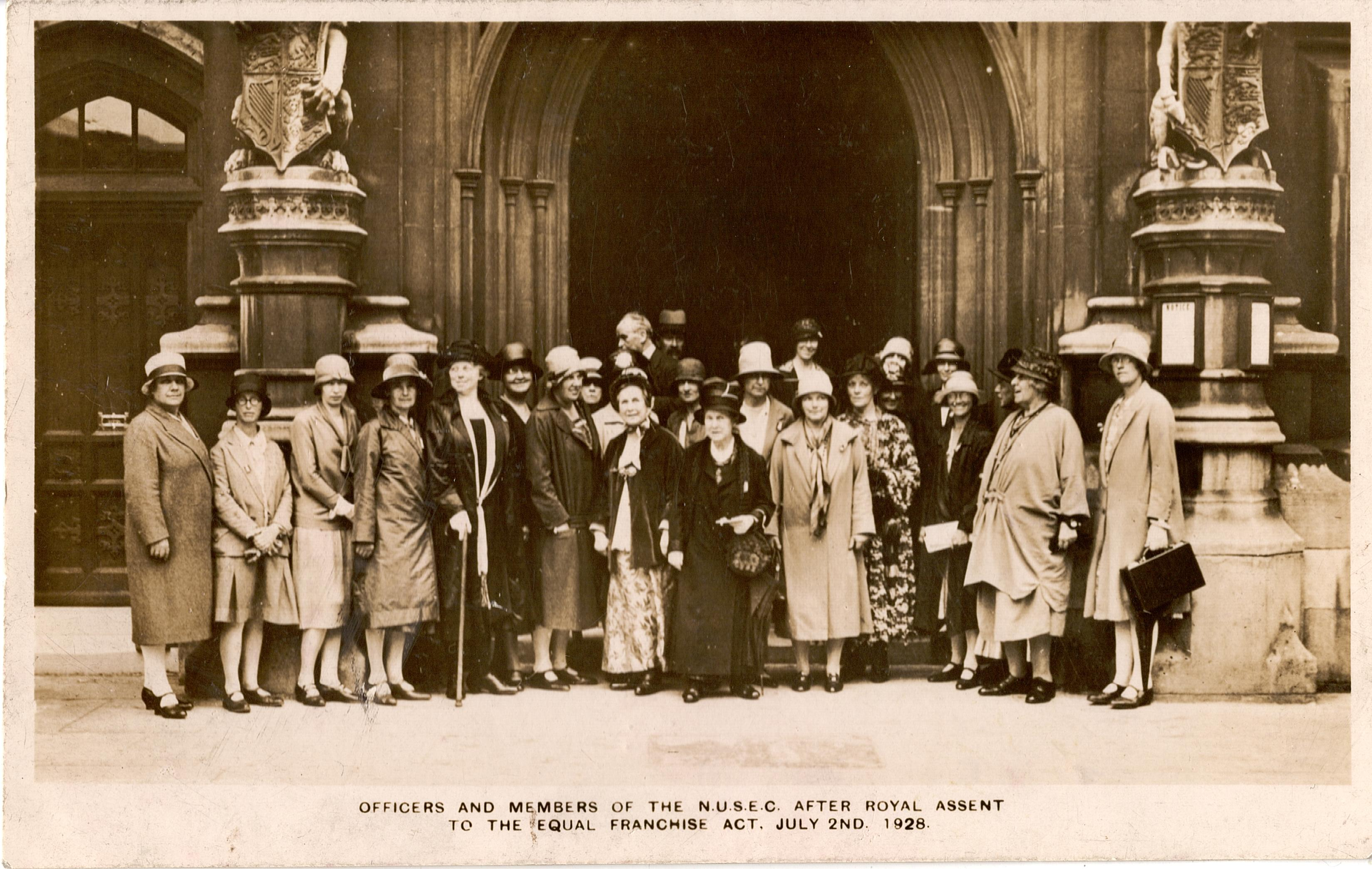
Officers and members of National Union of Societies to Equal Citizenship after Royal Assent to the Equal Franchise Act on 2 July 1928

In March 1919, the NUWSS renamed itself as the National Union of Societies for Equal Citizenship and continued under the leadership of Eleanor Rathbone with Eva Hubback as Parliamentary Secretary. It focused on a campaign to equalise suffrage, which was achieved in 1928 by the Representation of the People (Equal Franchise) Act.

The records of the NUSEC are held in the Women's Library at The London School of Economics and Political Science. Several of the oral history interviews undertaken as part of the Suffrage Interviews project, titled Oral evidence on the suffragette and suffragist movements: the Brian Harrison interviews refer to the NUSEC. The Scottish suffragist, Helen Fraser, a member of the NUSEC executive committee spoke about the structure of the organisation, and her membership of the Glasgow branch. The British feminist, Gertrude Horton, who took over from Eva Hubback, in 1927, as Parliamentary Secretary discusses her role in the NUSEC, as well as how the organisation was run, its methods of communication and lobbying of MPs, and what its premises were like. Vera Douie, first librarian of the Women's Service Library shared details of the objectives and relationship between the National Union of Societies for Equal Citizenship (NUSEC) and the Women's Service Society. Margery Corbett Ashby spoke, (in her interview of 28 May 1974), about her role as NUWSS secretary, and (in April 1975) about Fawcett and Rathbone's leadership.

In 1928 the NUSEC split into two groups, the National Council for Equal Citizenship, a short-lived group which focused on other equal rights campaigns, and the Union of Townswomen's Guilds, which focused on educational and welfare provision for women.

== Notable members of NUWSS ==
- Margaret Aldersley
- Catherine Alderton
- Betty Balfour
- Florence Balgarnie
- Anna Barlow
- Annie Besant
- Ethel Bentham
- Vera Brittain
- Elizabeth Cadbury
- Ada Nield Chew
- Margery Corbett Ashby
- Kathleen Courtney
- Lady Florence Dixie
- Millicent Fawcett
- Isabella Ford
- Henrietta Franklin
- Helen Fraser
- Alison Garland
- Sarah Grand
- Frances Hardcastle
- Katherine Harley
- Margaret Heitland
- Margaret Hills
- Elsie Inglis
- Louisa Lumsden
- Margaret MacDonald
- Chrystal Macmillan
- Louisa Martindale
- Catherine Osler
- Beryl Power
- Clara Rackham
- Katherine Raleigh
- Eleanor Rathbone
- Sarah Reddish
- Annot Robinson
- Maude Royden
- Amelia Scott
- Evelyn Sharp
- Nessie Stewart-Brown
- Janie Terrero
- Laura Veale
- Mary Ward
- Edith Grey Wheelwright
- Ellen Wilkinson
- Mary Stocks

== Archives ==
The archives of the National Union of Women's Suffrage Societies are held at The Women's Library at the Library of the London School of Economics, ref 2NWS. A collection of NUWSS material is also held by the John Rylands Library, Manchester, ref. NUWS.

== Commemoration ==
In 2022 English Heritage announced that the NUWSS would be commemorated with a blue plaque at site of their headquarters in Westminster during the years immediately before the passing of the Representation of the People Act 1918.

== See also ==
- Women's suffrage in the United Kingdom
- The Women's Library (London) – as well as the NUWSS archive the Library has extensive suffrage holdings
- List of British suffragists and suffragettes
- List of women's rights activists
- List of women's rights organisations
- Timeline of women's suffrage
- Women's suffrage organisations
- Liverpool Women's Suffrage Society
