= Eve's Sour Apples =

1934 feminist essay collection by Irene Clyde

- 1934 advertisement
- Author: Irene Clyde
- Language: English
- Subject: Feminism; gender; marriage
- Publisher: Scholartis Press
- Publication date: 1934
- Publication place: United Kingdom

Eve's Sour Apples is a 1934 collection of feminist essays by Irene Clyde, the pen name of English international lawyer and writer Thomas Baty. Published in London by Eric Partridge Ltd. at the Scholartis Press, it examines distinctions between the sexes, heterosexual marriage, reproduction and femininity. Clyde argued that conventional divisions between the sexes encouraged domination and opposed the expectation that women should marry.

The essays also defend aristocratic manners and associate femininity with refinement, opposition to violence and pacifism. Legal scholar Karen Knop has compared these ideas with Baty's later writing on international law.

== Background and publication ==
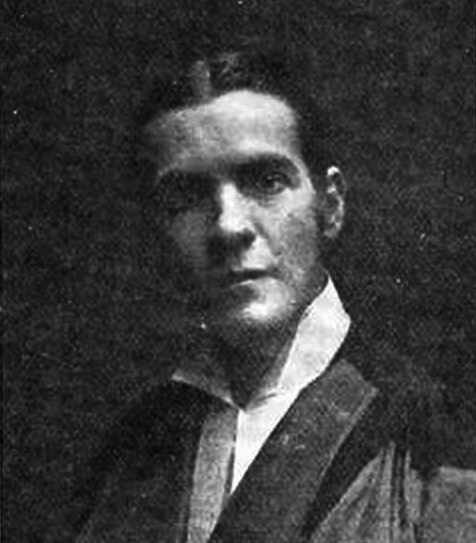
Irene Clyde (Thomas Baty), photographed in 1909

Clyde had published the feminist utopian novel Beatrice the Sixteenth (1909) and helped establish the Aëthnic Union, which opposed fixed distinctions between the sexes. In 1916, Clyde was among the founders of Urania, a privately circulated feminist journal that challenged conventional gender roles and marriage.

According to historian T. Maait Pepperell, Eve's Sour Apples reused wording from essays published in Urania in 1919 under the name Theta. The essays defended aristocracy and associated the cultivated classes with feminine refinement. Urania had stated that Theta alone was responsible for the opinions expressed.

Eve's Sour Apples was published in London in 1934 by Eric Partridge Ltd. at the Scholartis Press.

== Content ==
=== Sex and marriage ===
Clyde rejected the division of humanity into masculine and feminine categories. Discussing the book in the context of feminist and religious thought, historian Joy Dixon interprets it as criticising both the hierarchy between the sexes and the traits assigned to each. Clyde regarded heterosexual intercourse as bound up with domination and possession.

Clyde also opposed heterosexual marriage. Historian Sonja Tiernan cites a passage in which Clyde describes a woman's refusal to marry as a response to the institution itself, not an act of self-denial. Tiernan relates this position to Urania's criticism of heterosexual marriage and its presentation of relationships between women as an alternative.

=== Biological sex and reproduction ===
In "The Vanishing Sex", Clyde discussed physiologist Eugen Steinach's experiments on hormones and sex characteristics in guinea pigs, as well as reports of sex changes in oysters. According to literary researcher Matt Polzin, Clyde took these findings as grounds for believing that comparable changes in humans might become possible.

Polzin contrasts this reading of early endocrinological research with medical attempts to maintain binary classifications of sex.

=== Femininity, aristocracy and pacifism ===
Clyde associated femininity with courtesy, refinement and opposition to violence, while defending aristocratic social distinctions. Knop notes Clyde's lament for the decline of the cultivated classes, whose manners Clyde regarded as more delicate and feminine. Knop also notes that Baty's International Law in Twilight (1954) referred readers to Eve's Sour Apples in an introductory footnote and called for the replacement of masculine ideals in international affairs with feminine ones.

Pepperell notes the tension between Clyde's opposition to sex distinctions and support for class hierarchy. In the 1919 Urania essays, Theta associated aristocracy and femininity with pacifism while portraying the lower classes as rough and masculine.
