= Postgenderism =

Movement against gender roles

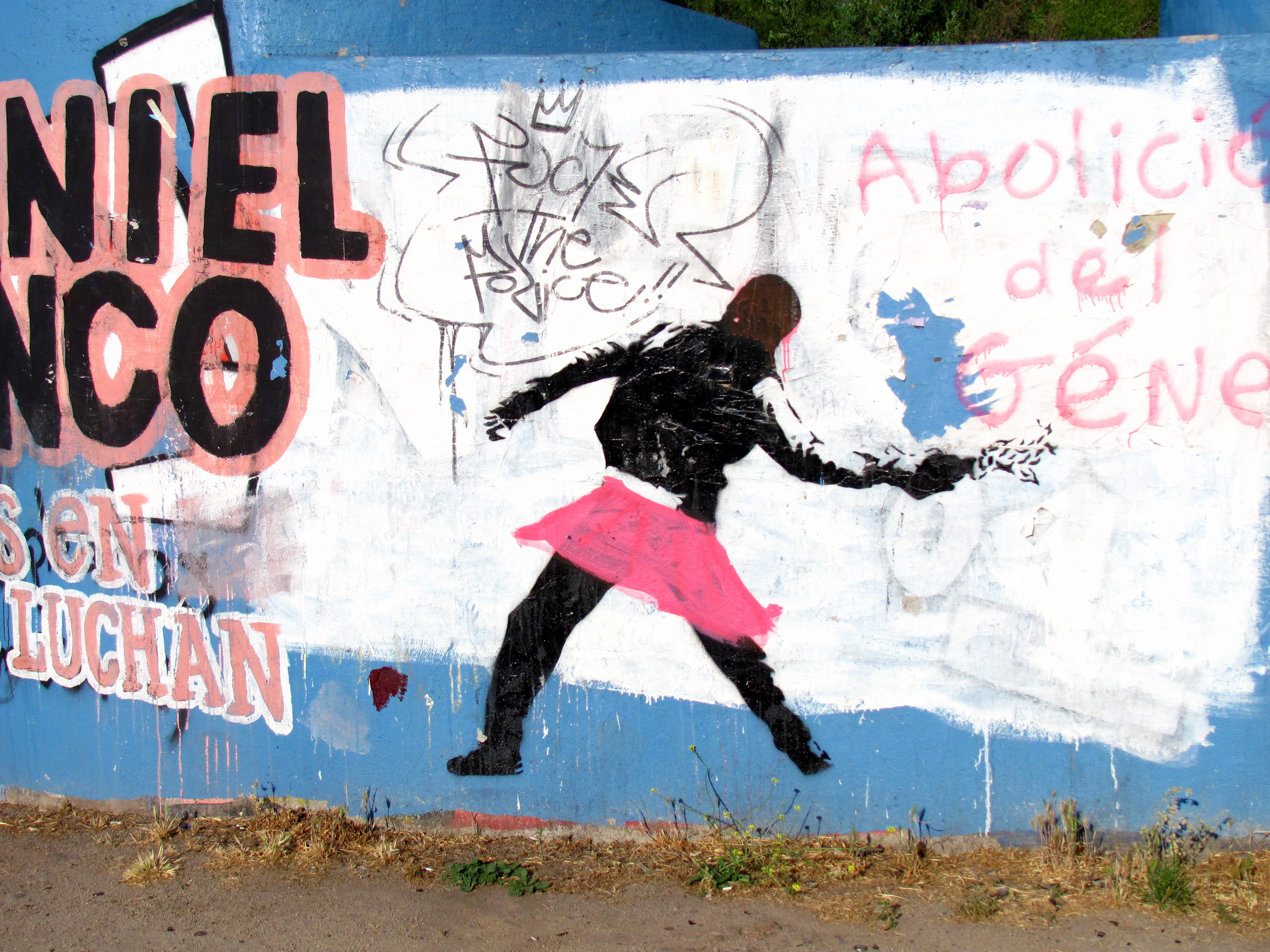
Graffiti advocating the abolition of gender

Postgenderism is a social, political, and cultural movement that arose from the eroding of the cultural, psychological, and social role of gender, and an argument for why the erosion of binary gender will be liberatory.

Postgenderists argue that gender is an arbitrary and unnecessary limitation on human potential, and propose the elimination of involuntary psychological gendering in the human species from social and cultural designations and through the application of neurotechnology, biotechnology, and assistive reproductive technologies regarding sex differences.

Advocates of postgenderism argue that the presence of gender roles, social stratification, and gender differences is generally to the detriment of individuals and society.

== Cultural roots ==
Postgenderism as a cultural phenomenon has roots in feminism, masculism, along with the androgyny, metrosexual/technosexual and transgender movements. However, it has been through the application of transhumanist philosophy that postgenderists have conceived the potential for morphological changes in members of the human species and for how future humans in a postgender society will reproduce. In this sense, it is an offshoot of transhumanism, posthumanism, and futurism.

In the 19th century, Russian philosopher Nikolay Chernyshevsky believed that "people will be happy when there will be neither women nor men".

Urania, a feminist journal privately published between 1916 and 1940, advanced the abolishment of gender; each issue was headed with the statement: "There are no 'men' or 'women' in Urania."

One of the earliest expressions of postgenderism was Shulamith Firestone's 1970 book The Dialectic of Sex. It argues,

[The] end goal of feminist revolution must be, unlike that of the first feminist movement, not just the elimination of male privilege but of the sex distinction itself: genital differences between human beings would no longer matter culturally. (A reversion to an unobstructed pansexuality, Freud's 'polymorphous perversity'—would probably supersede hetero/homo/bi-sexuality.) The reproduction of the species by one sex for the benefit of both would be replaced by (at least the option of) artificial reproduction: children would be born to both sexes equally, or independently of either, however one chooses to look at it; the dependence of the child on the mother (and vice versa) would give way to a greatly shortened dependence on a small group of others in general, and any remaining inferiority to adults in physical strength would be compensated for culturally.

Gayle Rubin expresses in "The Traffic in Women" (1975) her desire for "an androgynous and genderless (though not sexless) society, in which one's sexual anatomy is irrelevant to who one is, what one does, and with whom one makes love."

Another important and influential work in this regard was socialist feminist Donna Haraway's essay, "A Cyborg Manifesto: Science, Technology, and Socialist-Feminism in the Late Twentieth Century", in Simians, Cyborgs and Women: The Reinvention of Nature (New York; Routledge, 1991), pp. 149–181. In this work, Haraway is interpreted as arguing that women would only be freed from their biological restraints when their reproductive obligations were dispensed with. This may be viewed as Haraway expressing a belief that women will only achieve true liberation once they become postbiological organisms, or postgendered. However, Haraway has publicly stated that their use of the word "post-gender" has been grossly misinterpreted.

The term "postgenderism" is also used by George Dvorsky to describe the diverse social, political, and cultural movement that affirms the voluntary elimination of gender in the human species by applying advanced biotechnology and assisted reproductive technologies.

== Ideas ==
=== Postgenderism in gender roles and sexuality ===
According to George Dvorsky's article "Postgenderism: Beyond the Gender Binary", postgenderists are not exclusively advocates of androgyny, although most believe that a "mixing" of both feminine and masculine traits is desirable—essentially the creation of androgynous individuals who exhibit the best of what females and males have to offer in terms of physical and psychological abilities and proclivities. Just what these traits are precisely is a matter of great debate and conjecture. Here, postgenderism is not concerned solely with the physical sex or its assumed traits, but with the idea of eliminating or moving beyond gendered identities. In traditional gender constructs, one is either a man or a woman, but in postgenderism, one is neither a man nor a woman nor any other assumed gender role—thus, an individual in society is simply an agent of humanity to be defined (if at all) by one's actions.

Dvorsky also states that postgenderists maintain that a genderless society does not imply the existence of a species uninterested in sex and sexuality, but rather that sexual relations and interpersonal intimacy can and will exist in a postgendered future in different forms. Regarding potential assistive reproductive technologies, it is believed that reproduction can continue to happen outside of conventional methods, namely intercourse and artificial insemination. Advances such as human cloning, parthenogenesis, and artificial wombs may significantly extend the potential for human reproduction.

These ideas also propose that posthuman space will be more virtual than real. Individuals may be uploaded minds living as data patterns on supercomputers or users engaged in immersive virtual realities. Postgenderists contend that these types of existences are not gender-specific, thus allowing individuals to morph their virtual appearances and sexuality at will.

=== Postgenderism in humanist and socialist theory ===
Postgenderism can overlap with discussions of gender in humanism, namely about how humanist attitudes toward gender can promote unequal gender binaries. Discussions of these ideas include how anthropocentrism defines essentialist qualities of humanity that are imposed on gender—thereby informing hierarchical social structures, such as the patriarchy, that subjugate and dominate whoever becomes "non-human" within those hierarchies. For postgenderists, or posthumanists discussing gender, this can mean breaking down the boundaries around what defines humanity by encouraging connections with nature and machines and expanding the possibilities for human identities by deprioritizing "natural" notions of gender through technological principles within gender movements, like xenofeminism and "object-oriented feminisms."

Donna Haraway's "The Cyborg Manifesto" creates a socialist and posthuman basis for dismantling social hierarchies, namely through "the utopian tradition of imagining a world without gender." Haraway discusses how her theoretical figure of the "cyborg" occupies a postgender world that is independent and illegitimate from Western structures of patriarchal domination and how modern technology can make that figure a social reality. For postgender feminists, this involves manipulating forms of technology that shape binary control over gender — like biotechnology, immunology, and communication systems — to restructure or "recode" those narratives. Moreover, Haraway's definitions, like her "informatics of domination," navigate social theories regarding gender, sexual bodies, and reproduction towards the virtual and technological to eliminate "organic" notions of essential social inequalities within gender and sex, which extend towards race and class, addressing intersectionality in postgenderism.

=== Postgenderism in science fiction ===
Science fiction can provide a means to express postgenderist ideas through popular media, with literary or visual fiction capable of exploring technology's potential to create postgender bodies and societies. The Cage of Zeus by Sayuri Ueda depicts a postgender science-fiction society in which technological advancements allow people to alter their sex and gender as they wish. However, this fictitious society also appears as dystopian due to widespread discrimination against "Rounds," genetically engineered intersex people, describing the presence of discrimination between "natural" and "unnatural" gender identities. Literary analysis of the book's postgender themes expresses potential problems that can arise from a society with postgender technologies, like the fetishization of postgender bodies, commercialized monopolization of gender identity, and limiting the possibilities of postgender expression to a strictly techno-biological basis.

Analysis of postgenderism in science fiction films can emphasize how gender appears through inhuman entities. The realm of "alien feminism" primarily explores how science fiction films use posthuman subjects to critique stereotypical gendered identities. Examples include Ex Machina (2014) in how the film presents the feminine-appearing cyborg character Ava (Alicia Vikander) as characterized by stereotypically feminine sexuality but is eventually revealed to be manipulating these traits to her advantage. According to that analysis, Ava's physical progression towards feminine humanity is artificial, allowing her to escape male dominance. Another example is Under The Skin (2013), where an alien (Scarlett Johansson) takes the form of a human woman to murder men but later begins to experience and struggle with how gender is socially and violently imposed upon human female bodies, even when that body is inherently inhuman. The analysis concludes that these films do not wholly achieve postgender ideas but express postgenderism as a basis to resolve posthuman gender issues within science fiction.

Marge Piercy, an American feminist writer, engages with these themes in her work Woman on the Edge of Time. In her novel, a possible future is presented in which either sex can play either role in the childbearing process.

== Criticism ==
Transfeminist Julia Serano criticizes the idea of "end of gender", pointing out the negative impact it has on transgender people. On one hand, they are taken up as "undermining the gender system", while on the other, they are regularly criticized for strengthening gender stereotypes. In her opinion, feminism should fight for "end of sexism", rather than "end of gender". At the same time, Serano questions what should be considered the end of gender and what a society without gender should look like. She asks the question: "Who gets to decide what is gender and what is not?"

In Feminist Philosophy Quarterly, contributor Matthew J. Cull considers multiple formulations of gender abolitionism from varying perspectives and argues that they are uniformly transphobic and imperil trans lives.

== Novels with postgenderist themes ==
- 2312 by Kim Stanley Robinson
- Ancillary Justice by Ann Leckie
- Beatrice the Sixteenth by Irene Clyde
- The Cage of Zeus by Sayuri Ueda
- Distress by Greg Egan
- Don't Bite the Sun by Tanith Lee
- Glasshouse by Charles Stross
- Steel Beach by John Varley
- The Left Hand of Darkness by Ursula K. Le Guin
- Venus Plus X by Theodore Sturgeon
- Woman on the Edge of Time by Marge Piercy
- Xenogenesis trilogy by Octavia E. Butler

== See also ==
- Anti-gender movement
- Cyberfeminism
- Cyborg feminism
- Feminist science fiction
- Gender-critical feminism
- Gender ambiguity
- Gender anti-essentialism
- Genderless language
- Gender neutrality
- Intersex
- LGBT linguistics
- LGBT themes in speculative fiction
- Morphological freedom
- Non-binary gender
- Postsexualism
- Poststructural feminism
- Role theory
- Queer theory
- Sex differences in humans
- Social construction of gender

== Sources ==
- Galántai, Zoltán. Proposal for the Declaration of Intelligent Beings' Rights. Technical University of Budapest
- Haraway, Donna. "A Cyborg Manifesto: Science, Technology, and Socialist-Feminism in the Late Twentieth Century," in Simians, Cyborgs and Women: The Reinvention of Nature (New York; Routledge, 1991), pp. 149–181.
- Schaub, Joseph Christopher. Presenting the Cyborg's Futurist Past: An Analysis of Dziga Vertov's Kino-Eye. Department of Comparative Literature, University of Maryland
