= Dorothy Cornish =

English educator and social reformer (1870–1945)

- Born: Dorothy Helen Cornish; 1 October 1870; Sixhills, Lincolnshire, England
- Died: 7 October 1945 (aged 75); Sidmouth, Devon, England
- Occupations: Educator; activist; translator; writer
- Notable work: Urania
- Relatives: Thomas Garnier the Younger (grandfather); Thomas Garnier the Elder (great-grandfather)
- Family: Garnier family

Dorothy Helen Cornish (1 October 1870 – 7 October 1945) was an English educator, translator, writer, and social reformer. She worked as a Montessori teacher and interpreted for Maria Montessori during Montessori's courses in England. Cornish was a member of the Aëthnic Union and, with Eva Gore-Booth, Esther Roper, Thomas Baty, and others, co-founded and edited the feminist journal Urania from 1916. She moved to Siena around 1895 and lived for much of her life in Italy, while continuing her editorial work for Urania.

== Biography ==
=== Early life ===
Cornish was born in Sixhills, Lincolnshire, on 1 October 1870 to Rev. Frank Fortescue Cornish, H. M. Inspector of Schools, and Margaret Gertrude Cornish (née Garnier). Her maternal grandfather was Thomas Garnier the Younger, and her great-grandfather was Thomas Garnier the Elder.

Cornish moved with her family to Manchester when she was six, following her father's work.

=== Career ===
Cornish worked as a Montessori educator and interpreted for Maria Montessori during her English courses.

Cornish was a member of the Aëthnic Union, along with Eva Gore-Booth, Esther Roper, Thomas Baty (also known as Irene Clyde), and Jessey Wade. In 1916, they co-founded the feminist journal Urania, to which Cornish contributed and for which she served as an editor. She opposed the socialisation of children into gender roles.

Cornish moved to Siena around 1895 and spent much of her life in Italy. She continued to work as a co-editor of Urania while living there.

In 1914, Cornish signed the Open Christmas Letter with 100 other suffragists, including Gore-Booth and Roper.

Cornish was a member of the Brontë Society. In 1940, she published a novel about the Brontë sisters. The novel was reviewed in The New York Times. She also translated two essays by Emily Brontë from French.

=== Death ===
Cornish died in Sidmouth, Devon, on 7 October 1945.

== Publications ==
- Verses (San Bernardino: Pontifical Printing-Office, 1904)
- Sealed Poetry by Robert Burns (editor and translator; Firenze: Landi, 1908)
- These Were the Brontes: A Novel (New York: Macmillan Co., 1940)
