= CWI =

CWI may refer to:

== Organizations and institutions ==
- Care for the Wild International
- Centrum Wiskunde & Informatica, Amsterdam, the Netherlands
- Certified Welding Inspector, American Welding Society
- Children's Welfare Institute, Shanghai, China
- Christian Witness to Israel
- Civil War Institute at Gettysburg College
- College of Western Idaho, a new Community College in Nampa, Idaho
- Committee for a Workers' International (1974), an international socialist organisation which split in 2019 into the Committee for a Workers' International (2019) and International Socialist Alternative
- Communist Workers' International
- Cricket West Indies, the governing body for cricket in the Caribbean

== Other uses ==
- Chicago and Western Indiana Railroad
- "Civil War: The Initiative", a comic book crossover storyline
- Cloverway Inc., a Japanese Animation dubbing company in the United States
- CWI (encoding), a Hungarian character set in the 1980s
- The Cold War, on the grounds of a second
