= Aëthnic Union =

Defunct British radical feminist organisation

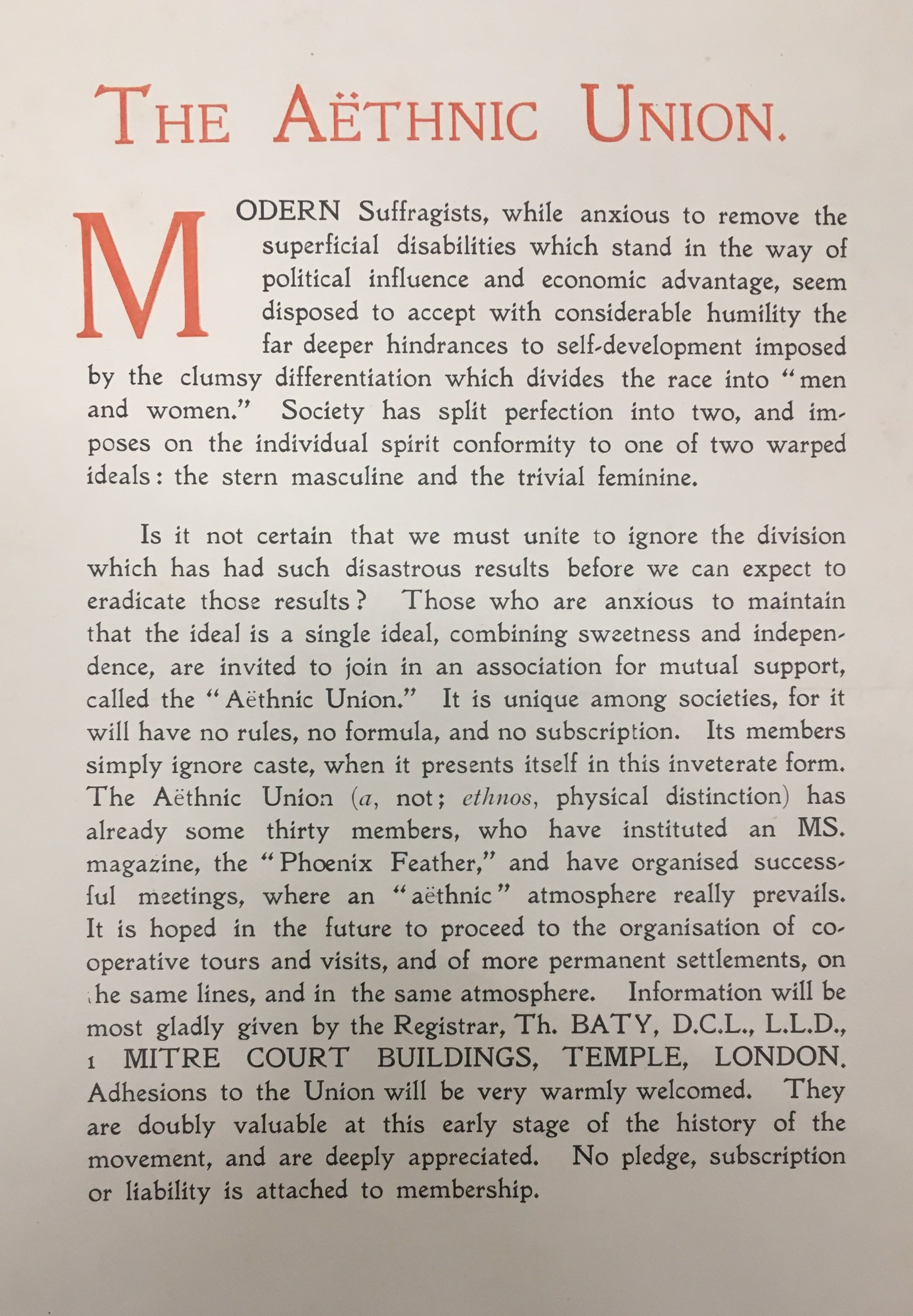
- Information about the Union
- Formation: 1911; 115 years ago
- Founder: Thomas Baty (also known as Irene Clyde)
- Dissolved: c. 1916
- Purpose: Promoting radical feminism, pacifism, egalitarianism, and gender neutrality
- Location: London, England
- Methods: Bi-monthly meetings, publishing articles, and organising discussions
- Key people: Eva Gore-Booth; Esther Roper; Jessey Wade; Dorothy Cornish

The Aëthnic Union was a British radical feminist organisation founded in London around 1911 by the lawyer and writer Thomas Baty, who also used the name Irene Clyde. It opposed binary divisions between masculine and feminine social roles and was associated with pacifism, egalitarianism and gender neutrality. Its members included Eva Gore-Booth, Esther Roper, Jessey Wade and Dorothy Cornish. The Union held meetings and discussion groups, and has been described by T. Maait Pepperell as a forerunner of ideas later published in the feminist journal Urania.

== History ==
In 1908, Baty, who has been described in scholarship as a transgender figure, began corresponding with the London Society for Women's Suffrage. Baty founded the Aëthnic Union in London in 1911. (Note: Some sources give the founding year as 1912, but the organisation was operating in 1911 based on Baty's correspondence with the London Society for Women's Suffrage.) The name "Aëthnic" was taken from the Greek "ethnos", meaning a race of people.

The Union's members included Gore-Booth, a poet and suffragist, together with Roper, Wade and Cornish. Their work in women's suffrage, animal welfare and education overlapped with the Union's interests. Maait Pepperell describes the Union as a forum for discussion of non-binary gender and social relationships, and as a precursor to some of the ideas later expressed in Urania.

The Union rejected the division of humanity into masculine and feminine ideals and argued that people should not be confined by prescribed gender roles. In material preserved by the London School of Economics, the Union stated: "Society has split perfection into two, and imposes on the individual spirit conformity to one of two warped ideals: the stern masculine and the trivial feminine."

In a 1912 advertorial for the organisation in The Freewoman, Baty wrote:

As things are, that insistent differentiation drags in its weary trail at every turn. In the dress they wear, in the games they play, in the occupations they follow, in their very food and drink, it is constantly borne in upon people that they must assimilate themselv[e]s to one or the other imperfect type. They are never permitted to be themselves. They are forced to strangle their own free development. From that soul-murder the Union would liberate them.

Members of the Union published articles and organised discussions. According to Maait Pepperell, internal disagreements over class and political strategy limited the Union's influence.

The Union met on the last Thursday of January, March, May, July, September and November. Sources describe it as active for about three years. By 1916, Baty had moved to Japan, and the group's work had shifted towards the production of Urania, which carried many of its ideas about gender.

== See also ==
- Feminism in the United Kingdom
- Timeline of LGBTQ history in the British Isles
