= Dudley Ward =

Dudley Ward may refer to:

- Freda Dudley Ward (1894–1983), mistress of the Prince of Wales from 1918 to 1923.
- General Sir Alfred Dudley Ward (1905–1991), Governor of Gibraltar
- Dudley Ward (judge) (1827–1913), New Zealand judge and politician
- Viscounts Dudley and Ward, in the Peerage of the United Kingdom
- M. Dudley Ward (1873–1958), English animal welfare activist.

== See also ==
- Dudley Ward Way, a road tunnel through the south-eastern part of the Rock of Gibraltar
