= Beatrice the Sixteenth =

1909 novel by Irene Clyde

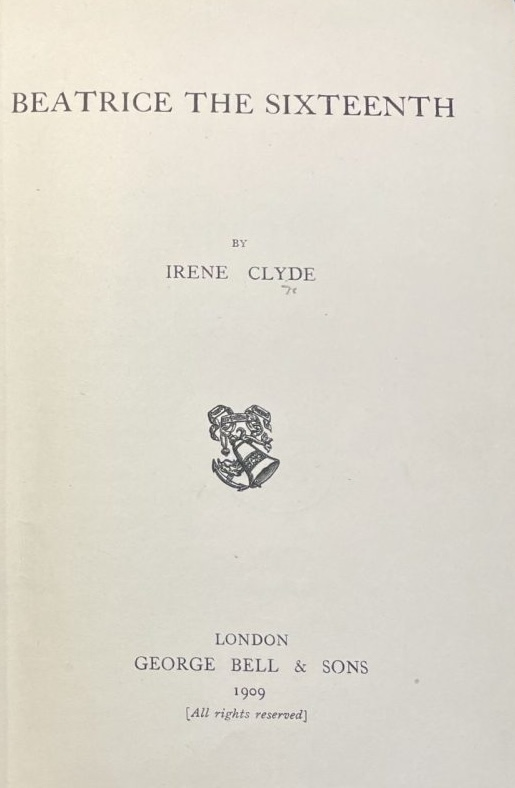
- First edition title page
- Author: Irene Clyde
- Language: English
- Genres: Feminist utopian fiction; Feminist science fiction; Lost world fiction; Romance fiction
- Publisher: George Bell & Sons
- Publication date: 1909
- Publication place: United Kingdom of Great Britain and Ireland
- Media type: Print (hardcover)
- Pages: 338
- OCLC: 557866271

Beatrice the Sixteenth: Being the Personal Narrative of Mary Hatherley, M.B., Explorer and Geographer is a 1909 feminist utopian novel by Irene Clyde, a name used by the English lawyer, writer and activist Thomas Baty. It follows Mary Hatherley, a British physician and geographical explorer who arrives in Armeria, a lost world society whose inhabitants do not recognise conventional distinctions between men and women. Armeria is a monarchy organised around lifelong partnerships, a vegetarian diet and a social hierarchy that includes slavery.

The novel takes the form of a first-person travel narrative, combining speculative fiction, romance and accounts of Armerian customs. Clyde initially avoids gendered pronouns for Armerian characters, later using predominantly feminine pronouns. Critics have examined this narrative technique, the novel's treatment of marriage and intimacy, and its relationship to Clyde's later writing for the feminist journal Urania.

Scholars have examined the novel in relation to feminist utopias, queer literature and transgender literature. Its portrayal of a society without familiar gender divisions has also been criticised for retaining class distinctions, slavery and colonial hierarchies. The novel was commercially unsuccessful on its initial publication, but was reissued in 2023 and 2026.

== Background ==
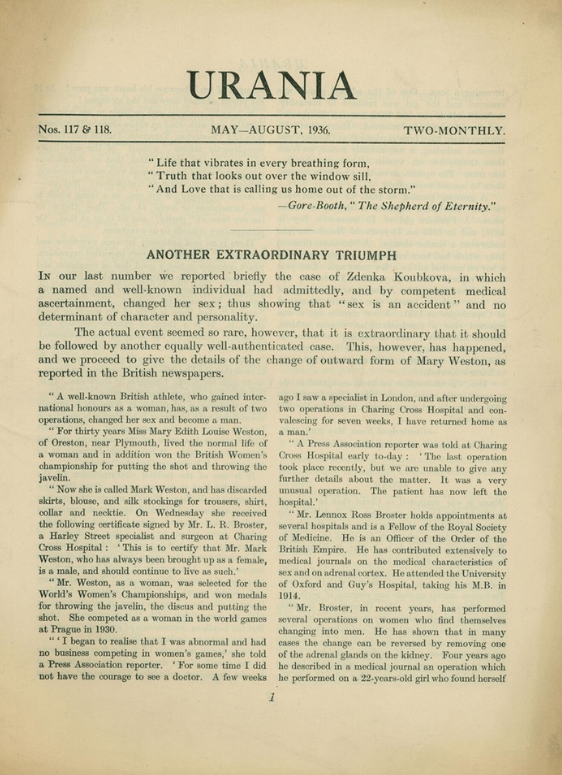
Cover of Urania, May–August 1936

Beatrice the Sixteenth was published under the name Irene Clyde, which Thomas Baty, an English international lawyer, legal scholar and activist, used for feminist writing. In literary and political writing, Clyde criticised binary gender systems and traditional gender roles. Clyde later co-founded and co-edited the privately circulated journal Urania, which rejected the division of humanity into two sexes and promoted a postgender ideal.

Clyde's fiction and editorial work addressed gender norms, heterosexual marriage and same-sex companionship. Beatrice the Sixteenth has been discussed in this context as a literary treatment of a society beyond gender binaries, and as part of the tradition of early 20th-century feminist utopias.

Modern scholars have characterised Baty's gender identity in varied ways, with some describing Clyde as non-binary, genderfluid, transgender or a trans woman, drawing on Clyde's writing and personal statements expressing a rejection of male identity and an affinity with femininity. These interpretations have informed later readings of the novel in relation to early transgender and LGBTQ literature.

== Publication history ==
The first edition was published in 1909 by George Bell & Sons in London. It was also published by Macmillan in New York. The novel sold poorly, and unsold copies remained with the publisher into the 1950s.

In June 2023, Mint Editions published a reprint in its Reading with Pride series. MIT Press released another edition on 31 March 2026, with an introduction by Lucy Sante. It was published in the Radium Age series, devoted to speculative fiction from 1900 to 1935. The novel had also been serialised online by HiLoBrow in 2024.

== Plot summary ==
Mary Hatherley, a British physician and geographical explorer travelling through the Arabian desert with an Arab escort, is knocked unconscious by a camel. When she regains consciousness, her escort has disappeared, and she is found by merchants wearing brown robes with yellow stripes. They take her to Alzôna, the capital of Armeria, a country unknown to her maps and ruled by Queen Beatrice the Sixteenth.

Mary is introduced to Armerian life through Ilex, a high-ranking official who offers her hospitality and explains local customs. She discovers that Armerians do not distinguish between people according to sex. Two terms that Mary initially assumes are gendered, kyné and anra, are used interchangeably. Armerians pursue artistic and intellectual interests and follow a vegetarian diet, having ceased slaughtering animals more than a thousand years earlier. Armeria nevertheless maintains a distinction between free citizens and enslaved people, some of whom work in Ilex's household.

Mary learns that Armerians may enter lifelong partnerships, known as conjux, based on companionship rather than sexual reproduction. The population is maintained by acquiring infants from neighbouring peoples, whom the Armerians regard as culturally inferior. Mary grows close to Ilex while observing the customs of the royal court and the lives of its servants.

Conflict arises between Armeria and the neighbouring Uras people, who seek to overthrow Queen Beatrice and conquer Armeria. Mary accompanies Ilex and other scouts into the mountains and caves to search for signs of the Uras forces. They are attacked, and Mary becomes more closely involved in the defence of Armeria.

The conflict culminates in a military victory for Armeria, although some of Mary's companions are killed or wounded. During the final celebrations, Mary learns of the distress of Nîa, an enslaved servant whose relationship with Zôcris has been damaged by events during the war.

At the end of the novel, Mary remains in Armeria and enters a ceremonial conjux with Ilex. Her account is presented as a manuscript sent to a friend in Scotland, who arranges for Irene Clyde to publish it.

== Themes ==
=== Defamiliarisation ===
Daphne Patai describes Beatrice the Sixteenth as an example of defamiliarisation, because it initially presents a society without familiar gender markers and challenges the reader's assumptions about gender categorisation. Literary researcher Matt Polzin draws attention to Clyde's use of kyné and anra, terms that Mary initially mistakes for gender categories. Polzin interprets the novel's avoidance of gendered language as an attempt to represent a society in which such categories do not structure social relations.

=== Gender and sexuality ===
Beatrice the Sixteenth has been cited as a precursor to later feminist utopias and modern radical feminist thought on gender and sexuality. Commentators note that the novel initially avoids gendered pronouns, referring to characters as "figure", "person" or "personage", but later increasingly uses feminine pronouns and stresses feminine traits. Although Armeria is presented as a genderless society, scholars including Sonja Tiernan argue that the characters are effectively female. Emily Hamer describes the book as a lesbian love story.

Clyde's approach to gender has been contrasted with Ursula K. Le Guin's 1969 novel The Left Hand of Darkness, which uses masculine pronouns for its agender characters. The novel has also been compared to Charlotte Perkins Gilman's Herland (1915), and Tiernan describes Clyde's novel as the more radical of the two. It has also been discussed as an early work of transgender literature. In a 2024 thesis, Lorenzo Imperitura interprets Armeria as a possible refuge from compulsory heterosexuality and conventional gender expectations, while acknowledging that its apparent lack of gender distinctions is open to question.

=== Critique of heterosexual marriage ===
Tiernan argues that the novel criticises heterosexual marriage and presents intimate partnerships between women as an alternative to the conventional relationship between husband and wife. She relates this treatment of marriage to the arguments later advanced in Urania. Armerian conjux relationships are lifelong but are not connected to biological reproduction. Taylor nevertheless observes that the practice retains the monogamy and permanence associated with Western marriage.

=== Social hierarchy and reproduction ===
Although Armerians do not recognise the conventional division of humanity into male and female, they retain a class hierarchy and practise slavery. Polzin observes that Armeria depends on obtaining infants from neighbouring communities: children acquired from people whom Armerians consider inferior are brought into Armerian society. Polzin interprets this system as a form of colonial appropriation, arguing that the novel's challenge to gender hierarchy does not extend to all forms of inequality.

In a 2026 review, Elizabeth A. Allen similarly examines the conflict between the novel's feminist ideals and its treatment of enslaved people. Allen discusses Mary's acceptance of the social position of Nîa, whose personal suffering receives comparatively little attention from Mary. Allen contrasts Nîa's unhappy relationship with the elaborate celebration of Mary's partnership with Ilex.

=== Pacifism and vegetarianism ===
Armeria's inhabitants abstain from eating animals, while the narrative also depicts military conflict with Uras. Allen interprets the book's comparatively restrained treatment of warfare, in which much of the fighting takes place away from the centre of the narrative, as consistent with Clyde's pacifism. She argues that the novel gives greater attention to conversation and intimate relationships than to battles.

== Reception ==
=== Contemporary reviews ===
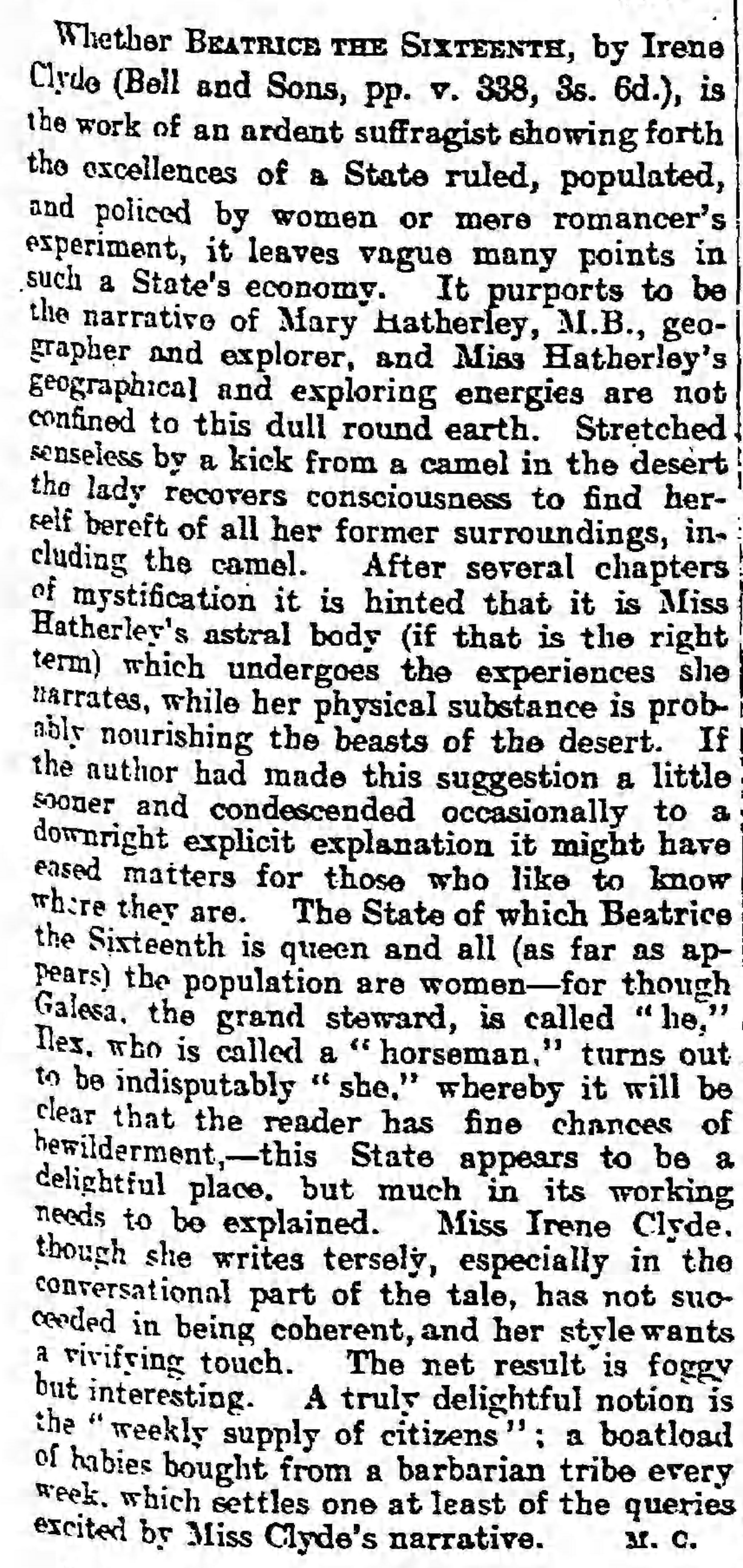
Review in The Guardian, 1 December 1909

A reviewer for The Nautilus described the novel as well written and interesting, and commented that its characters seemed real. The Theosophist suggested that "Adventures of Mary Hatherley" would have been a more fitting title, while approving of the vegetarianism of the Armerians. The Herald of the Cross read the novel as conveying a spiritual and occult message, representing the soul's journey on an occult plane of consciousness.

Louise Radford Wells found the novel unusual and wrote that she was initially confused by the genders of the characters, later realising that each heroine was also a hero. She concluded that the book was well written and entertaining. The Guardian speculated that the author might have been a suffragist, describing the society in the book as appealing but insufficiently explained. The reviewer found the book's style incoherent, while acknowledging its ideas.

A reviewer for Light: A Journal of Psychical, Occult and Mystical Research described the book's setting as unusual and difficult to understand, and argued that this made the story less engaging.

=== Modern scholarship ===
Melanie Taylor describes the novel as highly unrealistic and stylistically dense. She argues that it presents an idealised version of an entirely female world, but does not constitute a genuine utopia because Armeria is built on hierarchy, slavery and binary divisions. Taylor also argues that the conjux system preserves Western conventions of monogamy and marriage.

Polzin interprets the novel's treatment of population and enslavement as an example of a feminist utopia that challenges gender divisions while retaining colonial hierarchies. Jana Funke examines Clyde's feminist writing in relation to early sexual science and ideas about sex and gender in the journal Urania.

Cheryl Morgan observes that, despite the novel's treatment of gender, it portrays a utopia in which slavery is legal, comparing this limitation with Thomas More's Utopia.

Reviewing the 2026 edition for Foreword Reviews, Dontaná McPherson-Joseph described the book's detailed treatment of Armerian architecture and institutions, but considered its many descriptions an impediment to the narrative's pace. McPherson-Joseph also noted the development of Mary's relationship with Ilex. Allen praised the novel's unusual narrative methods and portrayal of relationships, while criticising its class divisions and the treatment of slavery. Allen also criticised Sante's introduction to the new edition for giving insufficient attention to scholarship about Clyde.
