= Thomas Baty =

English lawyer, writer, and activist (1869–1954)

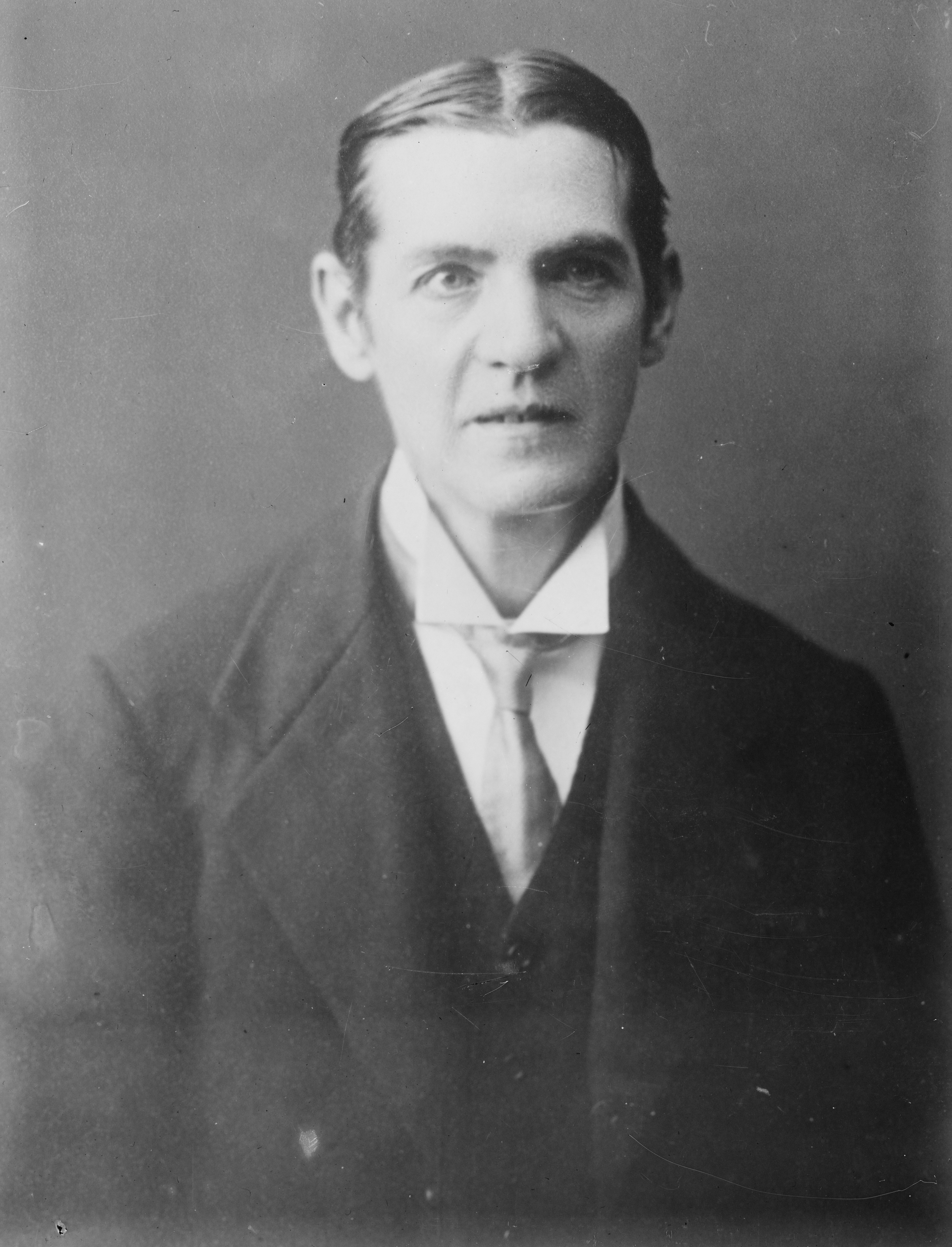
- Baty c. 1915–1920
- Born: 8 February 1869; Stanwix, England
- Died: 9 February 1954 (aged 85); Ichinomiya, Chiba, Japan
- Resting place: Aoyama Cemetery
- Other names: Irene Clyde; Theta
- Education: University of Oxford (B.A., D.C.L.); University of Cambridge (LL.M., LL.D.)
- Occupations: International lawyer; writer; activist
- Years active: 1898–1954
- Notable work: Beatrice the Sixteenth (1909); Urania (1916–1940); The Canons of International Law (1930); Eve's Sour Apples (1934); International Law in Twilight (1954)

Thomas Baty (8 February 1869 – 9 February 1954), also known as Irene Clyde, (Note: This article refers to Baty by surname or as Irene Clyde instead of using pronouns.) was an English international lawyer, writer and activist. Baty specialised in international law and began working as a legal adviser to the Japanese Foreign Office in 1916, later continuing the position after the Second World War. Under the name Irene Clyde, Baty wrote about feminism and gender, helped establish the Aëthnic Union and co-founded the journal Urania (1916–1940), which opposed distinctions based on sex. Modern scholars have interpreted Baty's gender identity in differing ways, including as transgender, non-binary, genderfluid and as a trans woman.

Baty studied law at The Queen's College, Oxford and Trinity College, Cambridge, and subsequently held academic and legal appointments in Britain. As Irene Clyde, Baty published the feminist utopian novel Beatrice the Sixteenth (1909), depicting a society without conventional gender distinctions, and the essay collection Eve's Sour Apples (1934), which criticised heterosexual marriage and traditional gender roles. Baty also advocated vegetarianism, served as vice-president of the British Vegetarian Society and participated in animal protection and humanitarian organisations.

After moving to Japan in 1916, Baty developed legal arguments concerning state sovereignty and recognition that were used to defend Japanese expansion into China. Baty remained in Japan during the Second World War and continued working for the Japanese government. Following Japan's surrender, the British government considered prosecuting Baty for treason but ultimately withdrew British passport facilities and consular protection instead. Baty remained in Japan until death in 1954.

== Early life and education ==
Thomas Baty was born on 8 February 1869 in Stanwix, Cumberland, the eldest child of Mary Baty (née Matthews) and William Thomas Baty, a cabinet maker. Baty had a younger sister, Anne. Their father died when Baty was seven years old. T. Maait Pepperell writes that Baty subsequently developed a close relationship with Mary and Anne.

Historian Peter Oblas writes that Baty's uncles provided financial support for the family, allowing them to maintain a middle-class household influenced by Victorian ideals of domestic life.

Baty attended Carlisle Grammar School and obtained a scholarship to The Queen's College, Oxford in 1888. Baty graduated with a B.A. in jurisprudence in 1892 and was called to the bar in 1898. Further qualifications included an LL.M. from Trinity College, Cambridge, in June 1901, a D.C.L. from Oxford later that year and an LL.D. from Cambridge in 1903. Baty also held appointments as a Civil Law Fellow at Oxford and a Whewell Scholar at Cambridge.

== Legal career ==
=== Early legal and academic work ===
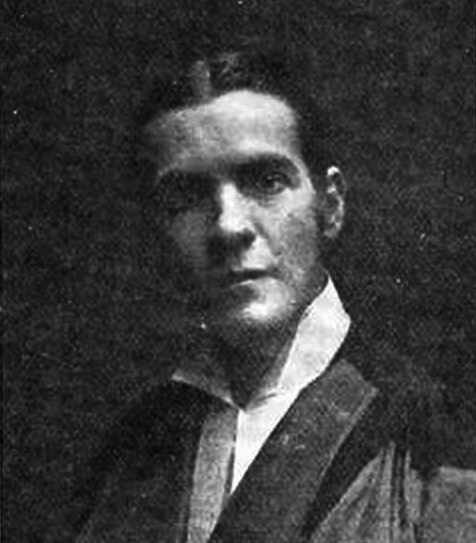
Baty in The Illustrated London News, 1909

Baty specialised in international law. After completing legal studies, Baty lectured at the University of Nottingham and served as a degree examiner at Oxford and universities in Liverpool and London.

Baty sought the Chichele Chair of International Law at Oxford in 1910, but Henry Erle Richards was appointed in 1911. Baty later received an invitation to take the position following Richards's death in 1922.

From 1905 to 1916, Baty was honorary general secretary of the International Law Association. Baty also acted as junior counsel in The Zamora, a case heard by the Judicial Committee of the Privy Council in 1916 concerning the wartime requisition of cargo from a neutral vessel. Baty became an associate member of the Institut de Droit International in 1921.

=== Japanese government adviser ===
Following the outbreak of the First World War, Baty helped establish the Grotius Society in London in 1915. Through the society, Baty met Isaburo Yoshida, Second Secretary of the Japanese Embassy in London and a scholar of international law at Tokyo Imperial University. The Japanese government was seeking a foreign legal adviser to replace Henry Willard Denison, an American who had occupied the position until his death in 1914.

Baty applied for the position in February 1915 and was accepted by the Japanese government. Arriving in Tokyo in May 1916, Baty began work at the Japanese Foreign Office. The appointment involved advising the government on questions of international law and preparing legal opinions. In 1920, at Baty's suggestion, the Japanese branch of the International Law Association was established. Baty received the Order of the Sacred Treasure, third class, that year for services as a legal adviser.

In 1927, Baty participated in the Japanese delegation to the Geneva Naval Conference on disarmament, described by Oblas as Baty's only public appearance in an official capacity as legal adviser. Most of Baty's work for the ministry consisted of written legal opinions. After several contract renewals, Baty became a permanent employee in 1928.

=== International law and Japanese policy in China ===
In The Canons of International Law (1930), Baty proposed that international law should possess four qualities: simplicity, certainty, objectivity and elasticity. Baty was sceptical of relying on the League of Nations to develop international law, preferring rules that could be applied independently of international political institutions. Oblas notes that a contemporary reviewer criticised Baty for giving insufficient weight to legislation and arbitration.

Baty developed a legal approach to state recognition that placed emphasis on the effective exercise of authority over territory. Baty argued that governments should be recognised according to their actual control rather than whether they fulfilled predetermined constitutional or political criteria. On this basis, Baty opposed de facto recognition, maintaining that recognition should be definitive and irrevocable. Baty criticised Western governments for using provisional recognition to conduct relations with authorities they did not fully acknowledge as legitimate governments.

Oblas argues that Baty's legal philosophy developed during employment with the Japanese government and was subsequently used to defend Japanese encroachments on Chinese sovereignty. Following the Japanese invasion of Manchuria in 1931 and the establishment of Manchukuo in 1932, Baty supported Japan's claim that the new state should be recognised. Baty's arguments informed Japan's defence of its actions before the League of Nations, including its response to the Lytton Commission's report on the occupation of Manchuria. In Oblas's account, Baty treated China as lacking the effective governmental authority required of a state and consequently rejected its legal objections to Japanese action.

Baty also prepared legal opinions supporting Japan's position during the Second Sino-Japanese War, which began in 1937. On five occasions, Baty donated 1,000 yen to funds supporting the families of Japanese soldiers killed in the conflict. Baty described these donations as humanitarian and maintained that the war could have been avoided had the League of Nations accepted the legal arguments advanced in support of Japan.

In 1936, Baty received the Order of the Sacred Treasure, second class.

=== Second World War and aftermath ===
In July 1941, the Japanese government froze the assets of foreigners living in Japan and its colonies in response to similar measures imposed by the United States. Baty was exempted because of employment with the Japanese government. Following the outbreak of war between Japan and the United Kingdom in December 1941, Baty remained in Japan rather than accepting arrangements for repatriation through the British Embassy.

Baty remained on the Japanese ministry's payroll during the war, although accounts differ on whether this constituted continued formal service as legal adviser. Murase dates Baty's initial period in that role to 1916–1941, while Oblas documents continued attendance at the ministry and preparation of written work during the war. Baty defended Japanese territorial expansion as a response to Western imperialism in Asia. In late 1944, Baty questioned the legitimacy of pro-Allied governments established after the end of the German occupation of European countries. Baty also contributed articles on British and American affairs to Japanese newspapers.

After the Japanese surrender in 1945, the British Foreign Office considered prosecuting Baty for treason. The Central Liaison Office, which investigated Baty's wartime activities, initially regarded the involvement with the Japanese government as relatively limited. Subsequent examination of Japanese records indicated that Baty had continued to receive official documents and undertake work during the war. British legal advisers nevertheless recommended against prosecution, taking account of Baty's age and the circumstances of employment with the Japanese government.

In September 1946, the British government decided not to prosecute Baty. Instead, it withdrew passport facilities and other forms of British protection, leaving Baty unable to return to British territory using a British passport. The decision prevented a proposed move to Bombay, where Baty had intended to establish a legal practice.

Baty remained in Japan. Murase dates the resumption of formal service as legal adviser to 1952 and its end to Baty's death in 1954.

== Feminist writing and activism ==
Baty also published feminist writing under the name Irene Clyde. (Note: The name Irene Clyde is used in this article when referring to works written under that name.) Literary scholar Jana Funke describes Clyde's work as opposing male dominance, challenging fixed distinctions between sexes, examining the possibility of biological sex change and criticising heterosexual marriage and conventional reproduction. Clyde also wrote favourably about intimate relationships between women.

=== Beatrice the Sixteenth ===
In 1909, Clyde published Beatrice the Sixteenth, a feminist utopian novel. Its narrator, the physician and geographer Mary Hatherley, enters the fictional country of Armeria, where conventional divisions between the sexes have largely been abolished. The inhabitants follow a vegetarian diet, although the society also practises slavery. The novel portrays close lifelong partnerships between inhabitants and examines same-sex love, marriage and the gender binary.

Literary researcher Matt Polzin notes that the Armerian words kyné and anra, initially understood by the narrator as gender distinctions, are interchangeable. Polzin also describes how Armeria obtains children by trading with a neighbouring population, whose infants are then forcibly assimilated into Armerian society. Polzin interprets this practice as an aspect of the novel's colonial hierarchy.

Literary scholar Maria Aline Seabra Ferreira describes Beatrice the Sixteenth as a precursor to later feminist utopian fiction and radical feminist theories of gender and sexuality. In a 2026 review, Elizabeth A. Allen criticised the novel's acceptance of slavery and class hierarchy, contrasting these features with its unconventional treatment of gender.

=== The Aëthnic Union and Urania ===
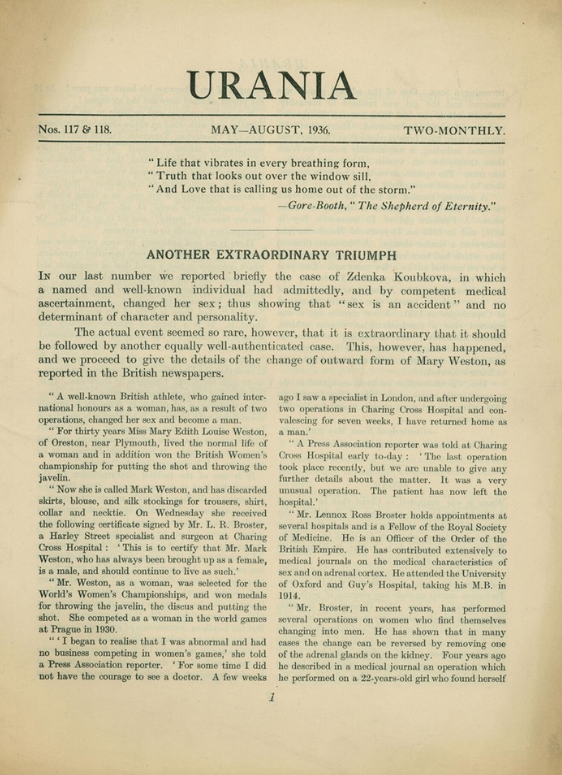
Cover of the May–August 1936 issue of Urania

By 1911, Clyde had helped establish the Aëthnic Union, a feminist organisation that sought to abolish distinctions based on sex. The union challenged social expectations associated with masculinity and femininity and opposed the division of people into two fixed gender categories.

Correspondence examined by historian T. Maait Pepperell shows that the union was organising meetings by 1911 and continued meeting until January 1914. A leaflet from 1911 reported approximately 30 members and a manuscript magazine called Phoenix Feather. Meetings took place every two months. In September 1913, the animal protection campaigner Ernest Bell gave a talk entitled "Are the sexes complementary?", attended by members including Alice Drakoules.

In 1916, Clyde, Eva Gore-Booth, Esther Roper, Dorothy Cornish and Jessey Wade, all associated with the Aëthnic Union, established Urania, a privately circulated feminist journal. It opposed conventional distinctions between men and women and argued against fixed gender roles.

The journal regularly used the statements "Sex is an accident" and "There are no 'men' and 'women' in Urania". Historian Sonja Tiernan notes that a 1921 editorial credited Gore-Booth with formulating the declaration that sex was an accident and had no essential bearing on individual identity. Clyde contributed articles and editorial material, sometimes under the name Theta.

Urania appeared from 1916 to 1940, initially every two months and later three times a year. It was distributed privately and without charge. The journal combined original writing, much of it by Clyde, with extracts from newspapers and books, book reviews and editorial commentary. Its subjects included same-sex relationships, androgyny, the social construction of gender and reported cases of sex changes.

A 1930 article in Urania, "The Slimy Enemy", criticised biological determinism, rejecting the notion that an individual's character and spirit were determined by the physical body. Historian Joy Dixon interprets the journal's opposition to sexual distinctions as a rejection of bodily sex as a determinant of identity, while noting that Clyde continued to regard femininity as an ideal.

Tiernan interprets the journal as advocating abstention from heterosexual relationships while presenting partnerships between women as desirable alternatives to marriage. In an article entitled "Marriage" (1934), signed "I. C.", Clyde argued that marriage perpetuated distinctions between "manly" and "womanly" characteristics. Clyde also wrote about love between women in a 1933 article on Queen Christina of Sweden, discussing the queen's reported relationships with women, including Ebba Sparre.

=== Eve's Sour Apples ===
Advertisement for Eve's Sour Apples

In 1934, Clyde published Eve's Sour Apples, a collection of essays criticising gender distinctions, heterosexual marriage and expectations surrounding women's reproductive roles. The book imagined a society in which conventionally masculine behaviour had disappeared and included advice on adopting a feminine appearance for people assigned male at birth.

In the chapter "The Vanishing Sex", Clyde discussed Eugen Steinach's hormonal research on guinea pigs and reports of sex changes in oysters. Polzin writes that Clyde interpreted these studies as evidence that biological sex could change and envisaged comparable changes in humans.

Clyde also criticised the expectation that women should become mothers, objecting to the emphasis placed on maternity in girls' upbringing. Tiernan quotes Clyde's argument that women might reject marriage out of aversion to the institution itself, rather than as an act of self-denial.

According to Funke, Clyde favoured spiritual or celibate relationships between women and opposed interpretations of sexual desire that relied on fixed categories of sex and gender. At the same time, Clyde criticised masculine presentation among women, including that of the protagonist of Radclyffe Hall's novel The Well of Loneliness (1928). Funke describes this response as a limitation of Clyde's otherwise radical views on gender.

Funke also identifies a conservative strand in Clyde's feminism. Clyde praised aristocratic manners and regarded femininity as closely related to refinement and social class. In 1919, writing as Theta in Urania, Clyde defended aristocracy in essays on feminism and pacifism. Pepperell notes that the journal specified that the opinions in one of these essays were Theta's own rather than those of the editorial group.

== Gender identity ==
=== Personal reflections ===
Baty's writings and personal presentation have been examined by historians of gender and sexuality. In a declaration on love and marriage written in 1926, privately circulated among friends and published after death, Baty recalled wanting to be a girl from an early age:

From my earliest years I hated sex. The reason was that I wanted to be a girl. I saw that ladies, while admittedly more graceful and sweet than men, were also just as determined and noble. I could not bear to be relegated to the ranks of rough and stern men.

In an autobiographical sketch published in Alone in Japan, Baty similarly recalled admiring qualities associated with women from childhood and wrote of having "longed passionately to be a lady—and have continued to do so".

=== Contemporary accounts ===
Baty generally used the name Thomas Baty in professional and public life, while Irene Clyde was used in feminist writing and some private social settings.

Friends and acquaintances described behaviour they regarded as feminine, including the use of women's speech patterns in Japanese and fastening clothing from right to left. Baty also sometimes wore women's clothing and accessories. The Canadian diplomat Hugh Keenleyside described Baty as a "transvestite" and recalled occasions when Baty entertained guests while wearing a gown.

Maait Pepperell describes friends observing a change in Baty's manner when appearing socially as Irene Clyde. One account portrays Baty's reserved professional demeanour giving way to the more animated and sociable personality of Clyde:

When he extended his hand in greeting his sombre eyes lit up, his withdrawn expression melted away. Dr Baty, Chief Legal Advisor to the Foreign Office of Japan, disappeared and in his place stood Irene Clyde, a gentle, kindly, witty, and intelligent elderly lady.

=== Modern interpretations ===
Modern writers have differed in their interpretation of Baty's gender identity. Descriptions have included non-binary, genderfluid, transgender and a trans woman.

Legal scholar Sandra Duffy describes Baty's gender identity as ambiguous and discusses the difficulty of applying contemporary identity categories to historical figures.

Historian Alison Oram similarly cautions against interpreting Baty's wish to be a woman solely through contemporary understandings of transgender identity. Oram identifies similarities between Baty's experiences and later transgender politics but argues that Baty's understanding of gender was shaped by the historical circumstances of the early twentieth century, including ideas that differed from those associated with later developments in medical transition.

== Personal life and death ==
=== Vegetarianism and other interests ===
Baty adopted a strict vegetarian diet at the age of 19 and later became vice-president of the British Vegetarian Society. Baty was also a member of the Humanitarian League and the Animal Defence and Anti-Vivisection Society.

Baty's religious views were influenced by Thomas Carlyle. According to William E. Butler, Baty came to regard the historical distinctions between Judaism and Christianity as relatively unimportant and emphasised the unity of religious traditions. Baty later became a Theosophist and an adherent of Shinto.

Baty never married. Baty's writings criticised conventional marriage, male dominance and the association of masculinity with warfare. Baty described a personal philosophy as radical feminist and pacifist, arguing that the adoption of characteristics traditionally regarded as feminine would help prevent war. Baty also supported the feminist movement in Japan.

Baty's sister Anne and their mother accompanied Baty to Japan in 1916. Mary died later that year, while Anne continued living with Baty until her death in Nikkō on 22 January 1945.

Baty's recreational interests included music, heraldry and sailing. Baty was described as politically conservative and was interested in localism, particularly small, self-sufficient communities. During summers at Lake Chuzenji, Baty sailed a boat named The Ark and socialised at the Nantaisan Yacht Club.

=== Death ===
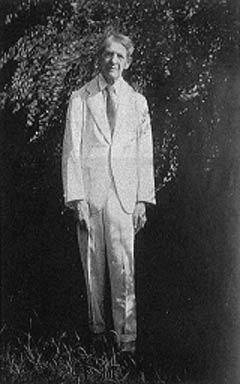
Baty, c. 1954

In later years, Baty lived in a villa in Ichinomiya, Chiba, provided by Kano Hisarō. Baty died there of a cerebral haemorrhage on 9 February 1954, one day after turning 85.

Emperor Hirohito sent flowers to the funeral. Eulogies were delivered by Prime Minister Shigeru Yoshida, Foreign Minister Katsuo Okazaki, Saburo Yamada, president of the Japanese Society of International Law, and Baty's former colleague Iemasa Tokugawa. Baty was buried in Aoyama Cemetery in Tokyo, alongside Mary and Anne.

Baty had written approximately 18 books on legal subjects and died shortly after completing the first proof of International Law in Twilight. Published posthumously in 1954, the book discusses questions of international law, history and politics, drawing on Baty's experience in Japan.

In International Law in Twilight, Baty argued that international law had lost the shared convictions on which it depended and called for the replacement of masculine ideals by an ideal of femininity. Legal scholar Karen Knop notes that a footnote in the book's introduction directs readers to Clyde's Eve's Sour Apples. Dixon interprets the book's conclusion in relation to Clyde's feminist writings and Baty's changing view of Japan, which had initially been idealised as a society receptive to femininity but subsequently experienced increasing militarism.

== Posthumous reception ==
In a 2004 account of Baty's life, international law scholar Shinya Murase described Ayako Sono's 1954 story Umi no Ohaka (A Grave at Sea) as modelled on Baty's later years.

Baty's memoirs, Alone in Japan: The Reminiscences of an International Jurist Resident in Japan 1916–1954, were published in 1959, edited by Motokichi Hasegawa.

In 1993, Daphne Patai and Angela Ingram identified Thomas Baty as the author of feminist and gender-related works published under the name Irene Clyde. Their research brought greater attention to the relationship between Baty's public legal career and feminist writing.

Alice Millea of the Bodleian Library writes that Baty's rejection of conventional gender distinctions and private departures from them have led researchers to examine Baty's place in transgender history.

Baty's defence of Japanese policy in China and continued employment with the Japanese government during the Second World War have also attracted historical criticism. Oblas examines Baty's role in providing legal arguments for Japanese imperial expansion, while other writers have discussed the competing descriptions of Baty as an international legal scholar, collaborator and apologist for imperialism.

In 2004, the University of Tokyo hosted a seminar marking the fiftieth anniversary of Baty's death. The event considered Baty's contributions to international law and included presentations by Vaughan Lowe, Martin Gornall and Hatsue Shinohara.

In March 2026, MIT Press published a new edition of Beatrice the Sixteenth in its Radium Age series, with an introduction by Lucy Sante.

== Works ==
=== Books ===
==== As Thomas Baty ====
- The Laws of Law. 1899.
- International Law in South Africa. London: Stevens and Haynes. 1900.
- First Elements of Procedure. London: E. Wilson. 1900.
- International Law. New York; London: Longmans, Green, and Co.; John Murray. 1909.
- Britain and Sea Law. London: George Bell & Sons. 1911.
- (translated with A. M. Baty) Jellinek, Georg (1912). The Rights of Minorities. London: P. S. King & Son.
- Polarized Law. London: Stevens and Haynes. 1914.
- (with John H. Morgan) War: Its Conduct and Legal Results. New York: E. P. Dutton and Co. 1915.
- Vicarious Liability. Oxford: Clarendon Press. 1916.
- Loan and Hire: Notes on the English Law of Lending and Hiring. Tokyo; London: Maruzen; Sweet & Maxwell. 1918.
- First Elements of Supreme Court Practice (2nd ed.). London: E. Wilson. 1924.
- The Canons of International Law. London: John Murray. 1930.
- Academic Colours. Tokyo: Kenkyusha Press. 1934.
- International Law in Twilight. Tokyo: Maruzen Publishing Co. 1954.
- Hasegawa, Motokichi, ed. (1959). Alone in Japan: The Reminiscences of an International Jurist Resident in Japan 1916–1954. Tokyo: Maruzen Publishing Co.
- Franklyn, Julian, ed. (1962). Vital Heraldry. Edinburgh: The Armorial.

==== As Irene Clyde ====
- Beatrice the Sixteenth. London; New York: George Bell & Sons; Macmillan. 1909.
- Eve's Sour Apples. London: Eric Partridge at the Scholartis Press. 1934.

=== Articles ===
- "The Root of the Matter". Macmillan's Magazine. Vol. 87, no. 519. January 1903. pp. 194–198.
- "The Aëthnic Union". The Freewoman. 1 (14): 278–279. 22 February 1912.
- (as Irene Clyde) "Queen Christina". Urania (101–102): 2–4. 1933.
- (as Irene Clyde) "Marriage". Urania (107–108): 1. 1934.
- "Can an Anarchy be a State?". American Journal of International Law. 28 (3): 444–455. July 1934.
- "Abuse of Terms: 'Recognition': 'War'". American Journal of International Law. 30 (3): 377–399. July 1936.
- "The 'Private International Law' of Japan". Monumenta Nipponica. 2 (2): 386–408. July 1939.
- "The Literary Introduction of Japan to Europe". Monumenta Nipponica. 7 (1/2): 24–39. 1951.; "The Literary Introduction of Japan to Europe". Monumenta Nipponica. 8 (1/2): 15–46. 1952.; "The Literary Introduction of Japan to Europe". Monumenta Nipponica. 9 (1/2): 62–82. 1953.; "The Literary Introduction of Japan to Europe". Monumenta Nipponica. 10 (1/2): 65–80. 1954.
