= National Society for the Abolition of Cruel Sports =

Defunct British animal welfare organisation

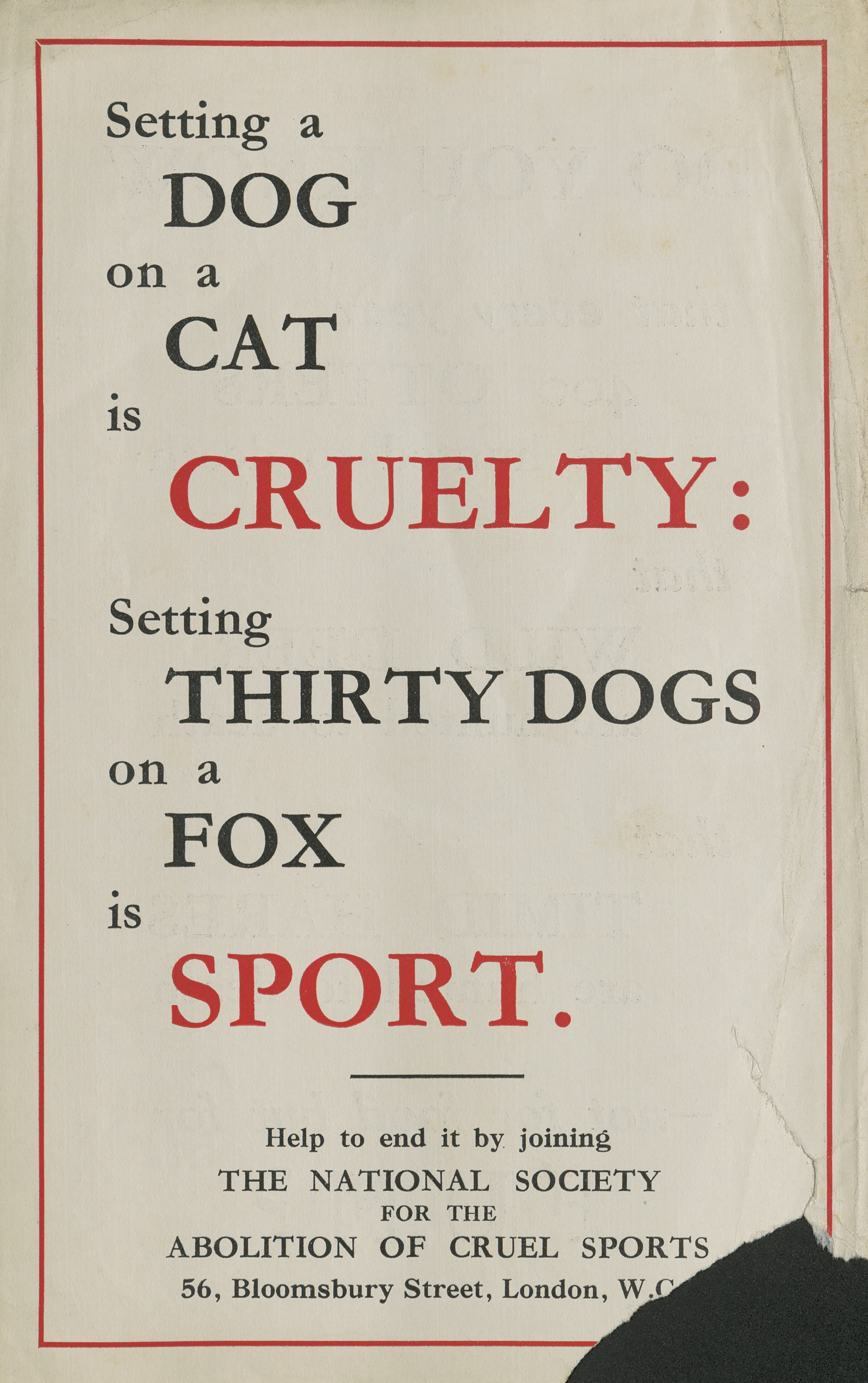
- NSACS promotional flyer
- Abbreviation: NSACS
- Formation: 1932; 94 years ago
- Founder: Ernest Bell, Stephen Coleridge, and others
- Dissolved: 2017
- Type: Animal welfare organisation
- Purpose: Opposition to hunting and other blood sports
- Headquarters: 56 Bloomsbury Street, London, England
- Origins: League for the Prohibition of Cruel Sports
- Region served: United Kingdom

The National Society for the Abolition of Cruel Sports (NSACS) was a British animal welfare organisation that campaigned against hunting and other blood sports. It was formed in 1932 as a splinter organisation of the League for the Prohibition of Cruel Sports over a dispute within the League over their criticism of the RSPCA. The organisation advocated for legal protections for wild animals and peaceful methods to end the killing of animals for sport. It was dissolved in 2017.

== History ==
Animal welfare workers Ernest Bell and Stephen Coleridge both resigned from the League for the Prohibition of Cruel Sports in 1931 over Henry B. Amos's continuous criticism of the RSPCA. In response they founded the NSACS in 1932 with others including Henry S. Salt and Jessey Wade. The Society's mission statement stated:

The Society's ultimate aim is to secure the legal protection and State control of British wild-life and the legal abolition of all forms of killing for sport; its immediate object is to educate public opinion to demand the suppression of the hunting and coursing of our native wild animals—Deer, Fox, Otter, Badger, Hare, etc.

The NSACS was based at 56 Bloomsbury Street, London. Its secretary was Bertram Lloyd with H. G. Chancellor as chairman of its council and Sydney Olivier, 1st Baron Olivier as honorary treasurer. In 1935, the Society published a pamphlet by John Tunnard denouncing otter hunting. Vice-presidents of the Society in 1948 were J. B. Priestley, Aldous Huxley, Harold Laski and Anthony Greenwood.

The Society advocated non-violent and peaceful methods to achieve its goal of bringing about the end of animal cruelties in the name of sport. It campaigned for the legal protection of wild animals. NSACS claimed to be the first British animal welfare organisation to support a Parliamentary Bill to bring wild animals under protection of the law. In 1957, they reported having 1263 members.

In 1966, all their records were lost. The Society was managed by Maurice Barbanell until his death in 1981. The assets of the Society were transferred to Care for the Wild in 1982. The Society was revived in 1985 by Vivien Craggs and Thelma How. During this time, Care for the Wild was considered an official wildlife division of the Society. The NSACS was dissolved in 2017.

== Legacy ==
Copies of the Society's publications are digitised and stored at NC State University Libraries.

== Selected publications ==
- Tozer, Basil (1935). Drag Hunting and Its Possibilities. National Society for the Abolition of Cruel Sports.
- Tunnard, John (1935). Slaughter of Beauty: Otter Hunting. National Society for the Abolition of Cruel Sports.
- Lloyd, Bertram (1938). Foxhunters' Philosophy: A Garland from Five Centuries (PDF). National Society for the Abolition of Cruel Sports.
- Chancellor, H. G. (1939). Food and Sport. National Society for the Abolition of Cruel Sports.
