= M. Dudley Ward =

English animal welfare activist and writer

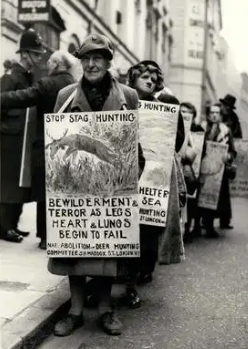
- Ward leading a procession in London for the protection of deer in February 1958
- Born: Mary Meynell; April 1873; Derbyshire
- Died: 19 October 1958 (aged 85); South Harrow
- Occupations: Activist, writer
- Spouse: John Dudley Ward (m. 1910)

Mary Dudley Ward (April 1873 – 19 October 1958) was an English animal welfare activist and writer. She was a member of the executive committee of the League Against Cruel Sports.

== Life ==
Ward was born Mary Meynell in Derbyshire to Emma Maria Wilmot and Godfrey Franceys Meynell in April 1873. She became a vegetarian in her youth out of disgust of slaughterhouses. In 1910, she married John Dudley Ward. She was honorary secretary of the Paddington and North Kensington Anti-Vivisection Society. She was influential in the formation of the Cats Protection League and attended the inaugural meeting on 16 May 1927 with Jessey Wade and others.

In December 1929, Ward was a speaker at a meeting for the World League of Ahimsa. She delivered a speech on the "wholesale slaughter" associated with Christmas dinner, commenting that the terrible massacre of animals was incompatible with the "season of peace and goodwill". During this period, Ward resided at Upper Westbourne Terrace in Paddington. She was a member and speaker of the Animal Defence and Anti-Vivisection Society. Ward was a friend of a younger man, Harry Gordon Everett who considered Ward his teacher on animal welfare. He was charged in 1934 for breaking into her home without permission. In 1935, he swallowed 110 aspirins following the breakup of their friendship and was sentenced to six months imprisonment for attempted suicide.

Ward was a member of the RSPCA and attended local meetings. She campaigned against the RSPCA's use of prussic acid to euthanize cats. In 1931, she requested for the RSPCA to advertise the cruelty of the fur trade. In 1934, Ward resigned from the RSPCA after several of its members were expelled for questioning the treatment of animals at RSPCA clinics. As a vegetarian, Ward criticized the humane slaughter reform movement, commenting that "they seem in danger of forgetting it is at best a mitigant, and not a reliable eliminator of cruelty, and that attempts to reconcile ethics with expediency are always desperate ones". She described the slaughter of cattle and pigs as a "martyred holocaust" that was being used to satisfy an unnecessary habit of meat eating. She argued that slaughter was not humane and concluded that although the RSPCA's "Humane Killer" was a step in the right direction, the only way to avoid animal suffering from a meal was to cut out all meat eating.

In 1937, Ward was a speaker at the annual meeting of the Worthing Branch of the British Union for the Abolition of Vivisection. Ward was a staunch opponent of blood sports. She was a member of the executive committee of the League Against Cruel Sports. In 1957, she won the support from the committee for her suggestion that a deputation from the League should be sent to Buckingham Palace to abolish fox and stag hunting before the Queen.

Ward resided in South Harrow for the last 21 years of her life. In her later years, she spent much time feeding and helping pigeons that roosted around South Harrow tube station. At age 85 with a broken arm, Ward still fed the pigeons and described them as her personal friends.

== Views on kosher ==
In 1944, Ward authored a book titled Jewish "Kosher": Should it be permitted to survive in a new Britain?, which argued against the use of kosher meat on ethical grounds, claiming that "The Jewish business is not slaughter—it’s murder!’". She suggested that most Jews would oppose Shechita but there was a lot of money to make from it. In 1946, Rabbi's from the New York Research Institute for Post War Problems of Religious Jewry denounced the book and claimed it was being publicized by detractors of the Jewish slaughtering method.

In the 1951 edition of the book, Ward commented that "I do not want my animal welfare campaign to be confused with racial prejudices. The time comes, however, when honest opinions must be expressed, regardless of what offence may be taken; and I condemn kosher slaughter wholeheartedly as a most appalling barbarity... not because it is Jewish but because the normal horrors of the slaughterhouse are in this way multiplied with savagery".

== Death ==
Ward died in 1958, aged 85 at her residence in South Harrow. An obituary described her as a "woman who was the friend of all animals and devoted much of her time to rousing public opinion against blood sports". Ward was buried at Pinner New Cemetery. Many representatives from animal welfare organizations attended her funeral.

== Mistaken identity from historians ==
Dudley Ward was incorrectly identified as an anti-Semite by historian Richard Griffiths who confused her identity with a British Union of Fascists supporter. Griffiths identified Dudley Ward as Maidie Florence, (Note: Maidie Florence Kate Constance Hope died on 18 April 1945) divorced wife of Major Charles Dudley Ward. According to Griffiths she was an anti-Semite and member of the Nordic League who attended a January Club meeting in 1934.

== Selected publications ==
- "The Surplus Cat Problem" (PDF). The Animals' Friend. 44 (10): 352–353. 1938.
- Jewish "Kosher": Should it be permitted to survive in a new Britain? (1944)
