= Jessey Wade =

English animal welfare campaigner (1859–1952)

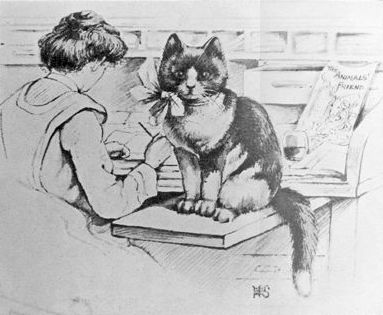
- A woman, possibly Wade, with the office cat Tibby, from The Animals' Friend Cat Book (1917)
- Born: Anna Jessey Wade; 2 December 1859; Westminster, Middlesex, England
- Died: 10 May 1952 (aged 92); London, England
- Occupations: Animal welfare campaigner; writer; editor; women's suffrage activist
- Known for: Founding the Cats Protection League; Co-founding Urania

Anna Jessey Wade (2 December 1859 – 10 May 1952) was an English animal welfare campaigner, writer, editor and women's suffrage activist. She worked with Ernest Bell on animal welfare publications, edited Little Animals' Friend and founded the Cats Protection League in 1927. She also co-founded the feminist journal Urania and the National Society for the Abolition of Cruel Sports.

== Biography ==
=== Early life ===
Wade was born Anna Jessey Wade on 2 December 1859, in Westminster, Middlesex, to John and Anna Wade.

=== Animal welfare and publishing ===
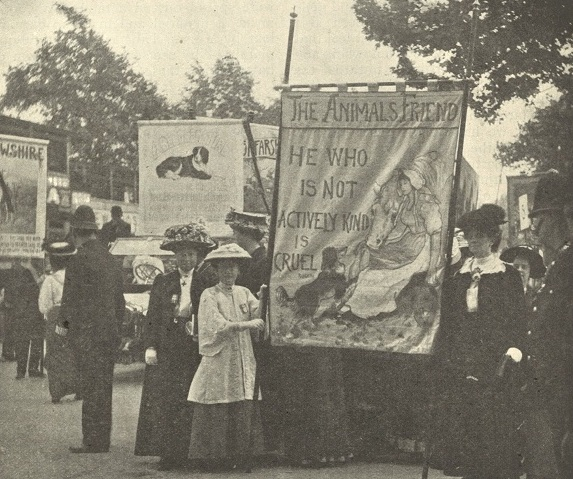
Ernest Bell and Jessey Wade's banner for The Animals' Friend, parading through London in 1909, during the Anti-Vivisection International Congress

Wade worked as the personal secretary of Ernest Bell until his death in 1933. She worked at George Bell & Sons at York House, 6 Portugal Street, London. Bell edited The Animals' Friend, and Wade edited its children's companion, Little Animals' Friend, succeeding Edith Carrington.

Wade contributed articles to The Animals' Friend and wrote material for the Animals' Friend Society. Her contributions included the pamphlets Cruelties in Dress and Mother Love in the Animal World, and the leaflets Fur Coats, Hats and the Woman, Little Father Christmas and Winter Cruelties. From 1906 to 1919, she was honorary secretary of the Children's Department of the Humanitarian League.

Wade published The Animals' Friend Cat Book through George Bell & Sons in 1917. It included an illustration of the firm's cat Tibby with a woman whom Cats Protection has suggested might be Wade. On 16 May 1927, a meeting at Caxton Hall, London, established the Cats Protection League, organised by Wade. Bell became the league's treasurer. In June 1927, the league gave its headquarters as the Animals' Friend's Office, York House, Portugal Street, London. Wade began editing its magazine, The Cats' Mews-Sheet, when it launched in 1931. The magazine was renamed The Cat in 1934, and she continued as editor until March 1935.

In 1932, Wade co-founded the National Society for the Abolition of Cruel Sports with Bell and others. She was also involved with the Pit Ponies' Protection Society and the Performing and Captive Animals' Defence League. She met B. Maude Phillips of the Animal Rescue League of Boston in London. She also spoke for the Humane Education Society in Manchester.

=== Women's suffrage and Urania ===
Wade was a member of the Women's Freedom League. During the suffragette boycott of the 1911 census, she refused to provide the requested information. She belonged to the Aëthnic Union, founded by Thomas Baty in 1912. In 1916, she co-founded Urania with Baty, Eva Gore-Booth, Esther Roper and Dorothy Cornish. The journal opposed distinctions based on sex and gender.

=== Personal life and death ===
In 1945, The Cat reported that Wade was in poor health following a serious accident, and that she had undergone an operation for cataracts.

Wade retired from editing Little Animals' Friend in 1948. A contemporary newspaper described her as having worked on the magazine for fifty years. She died at her home at Abbey Road Mansions on 10 May 1952, aged 92. She was cremated at Golders Green Crematorium on 15 May.

== Animal welfare organisations ==
Wade held roles in several animal welfare organisations:

- Humanitarian League, Honorary Secretary of the Children's Department, 1906–1919
- Pit Ponies' Protection Society, member
- National Society for the Abolition of Cruel Sports, co-founder with Ernest Bell and others
- Cats Protection League, founder
- Humane Education Society Council for Protection of Animals, vice-president

== Publications ==
=== Books ===
- The Animals' Friend Cat Book (London: G. Bell and Sons, 1917)

=== Magazines ===
- Little Animals' Friend (editor)
- The Cats' Mews-Sheet (1931–1934; renamed The Cat in 1934; editor until 1935)

=== Pamphlets ===
- Cruelties in Dress (London: Animals' Friend Society, 1912)
- Mother Love in the Animal World (London: Animals' Friend Society)
- Fur Coats (London: Animals' Friend Society)
- Hats and the Woman (London: Animals' Friend Society)
- Little Father Christmas (London: Animals' Friend Society)
- Winter Cruelties (London: Animals' Friend Society)
- We & the Animals Are Kin (National Council for Animals' Welfare)

== See also ==
- Animal welfare in the United Kingdom
- Women and animal advocacy
