= Scholartis Press =

Former small publisher in England

Scholartis Press was a small, private press in London, England, founded by Eric Partridge in 1927. The press closed in 1931, when the Great Depression began in Britain.

== Bibliography ==
=== Writers published ===
- William Blake, Poetical Sketches. With an Essay on "Blake's Metric" by Jack Lindsay, 1927
- Henry Mackenzie, The Man of Feeling, 1928
- Nicholas Breton, Melancholike humours. Edited, with an Essay on "Elizabethan melancholy", by G.B. Harrison
- Richard Henry Horne, Orion, 1928
- Elza de Locre, I See the Earth: Poems, 1928. Illustrated by Peter Meadows, pseudonym for Jack Lindsay
- Norah Hoult, Poor Women!, 1928
- Nicholas Rowe, Three plays: Tamerlane, The Fair Penitent, Jane Shore, 1929
- Laurence Sterne, A Sentimental Journey. Edited with Introduction and Notes by Herbert Read, 1929
- Edmund Spenser, Daphnaïda and other poems, 1929
- Horace Walpole, The Castle of Otranto, 1929
- Natalie Clifford Barney, The One Who is Legion or A.D.'s After Life. Printed with two illustrations by Romaine Brooks, 1930
- Maude Meagher, White Jade, 1930
- George Sand, The Country Waif and "The Castle of Pictordu", tr. Eirene Collis, 1930
- Irene Clyde, Eve's Sour Apples, 1934
- Edmund Spenser, A view of the State of Ireland, 1934

=== Book series ===
- Benington Books
- An Elizabethan Gallery
- Nineteenth-Century Highways and Byways Series
- Scholartis Eighteenth-Century Novels
