= Cats Protection =

British charity for rehoming stray cats

- Logo used since 2023
- Founded: 16 May 1927; 99 years ago
- Founder: Jessey Wade
- Type: Charity
- Registration no.: 203644
- Legal status: Charity
- Purpose: Animal welfare
- Headquarters: Chelwood Gate, Haywards Heath, West Sussex, England
- Coordinates: 51.055052°N 0.022852°E
- Region served: United Kingdom
- CEO: John May
- Website: cats.org.uk
- Formerly called: Cats Protection League

Cats Protection, formerly the Cats Protection League, is a UK charity dedicated to rescuing and rehoming stray, unwanted or homeless cats and educating people about cats and cat welfare. The organization was founded as the Cats Protection League by Jessey Wade and others in 1927. The name was shortened in 1998. The current Chief Executive is John May.

== History ==
Cats Protection was formed at a meeting in Caxton Hall on the 16 May of 1927 under the chairmanship of Jessey Wade. The charity was launched under the auspices of the Animals' Friend Society and from the work of M. Dudley Ward. Amongst those present at the formation meeting were M. Dudley Ward, Jessey Wade, Charles Forward and Mrs Avery. Ernest Bell was made Treasurer and Mrs Avery Honorary Secretary. The first headquarters of Cats Protection were located at the Animals' Friend's Office at York House, Portugal Street in London. The aims of the charity were to prevent the suffering of strays and provide suitable homes for cats during the absence of their owners.

In 1931 the charity launched its magazine, The Cats’ Mews-Sheet. It was renamed The Cat in 1934.

== Aims ==
- To find good homes for cats in need
- To support and encourage the neutering of cats
- To improve people's understanding of cats and their care

== Operations ==
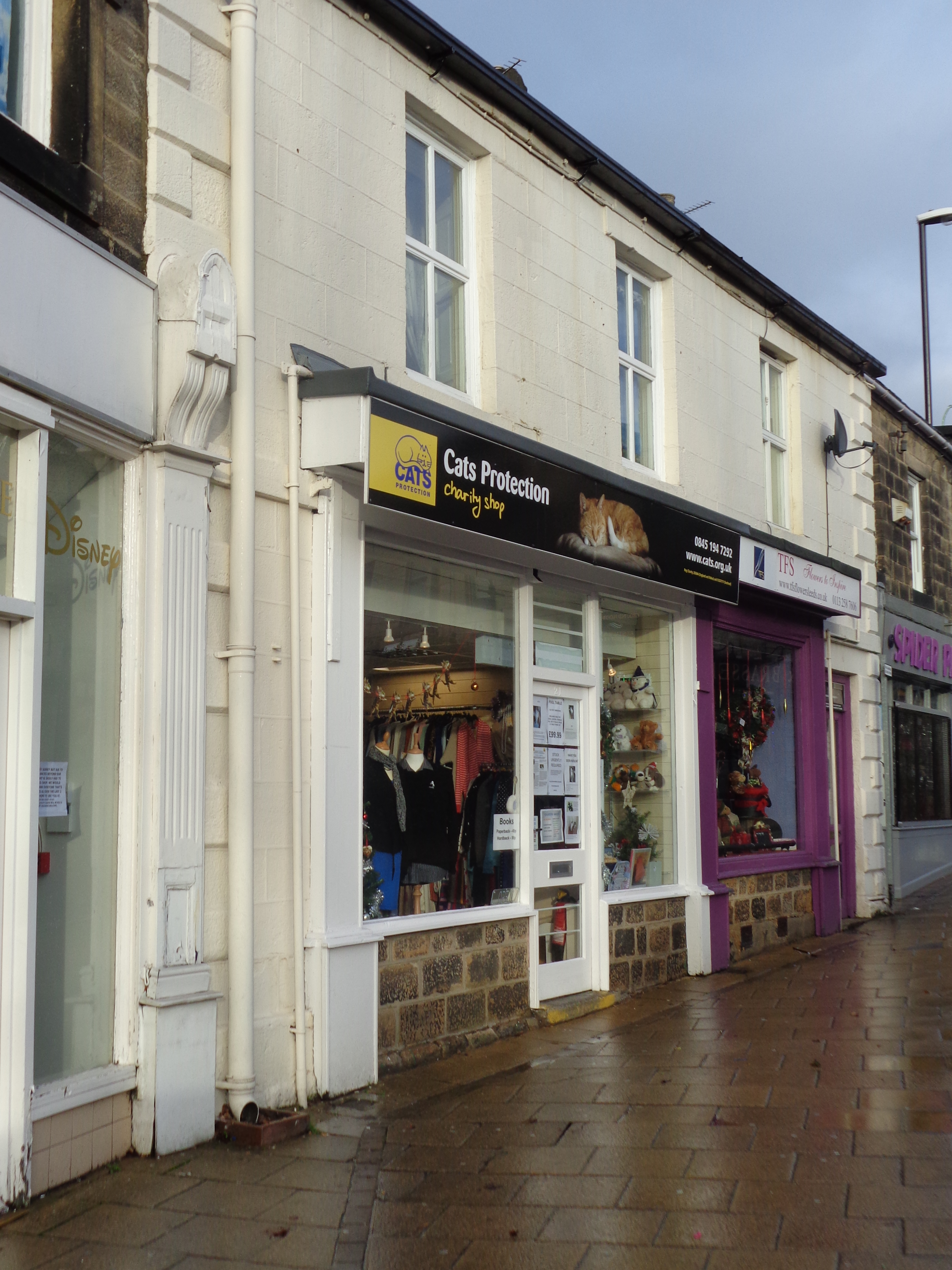
Cats Protection charity shop in Horsforth, Leeds

In 2017, the charity helped nearly 193,000 cats (rehoming around 43,000 of these and neutering 153,000). Its network had 36 centres, 250+ volunteer-run teams, 121 charity shops and approximately 10,200 volunteers and employees located throughout the UK. The charity's income for 2017 was £62.9 million.

Alongside rehoming cats and kittens, the charity runs a neutering scheme for owners on a limited income, and a National Information Line. In addition, they monitor feral colonies in the area including trapping, neutering and re-releasing (where possible) feral cats back to where they came from. They also work to educate adults and children about cat welfare, and run talks and educational resource programmes across the UK.

=== Volunteer teams ===
The charity operates in two ways: volunteer-run teams and centres. The main difference is that volunteer-run teams are people with a spare room or space in a garden for a pen (or two). Instead of visiting a dedicated centre, the person wishing to adopt a cat usually visits it in another person's home.

=== Adoption centres ===
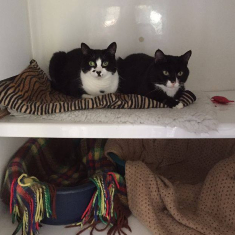
Two cats (Lady and Bella) sitting in a Cats Protection adoption centre in London. Both were subsequently adopted.

Dedicated centres are of varying size and have paid employees in addition to volunteers on their team. The vast majority of the public visit these places to adopt a cat or a kitten. Centres are funded centrally by the charity. In addition, there is often the chance of cat sponsorship, where members of the public can sponsor a pen in return for a monthly or annual donation. Sponsors receive regular updates on the cats using their pens.

In February 2002, Cats Protection acquired the Isle of Thorns estate from the University of Sussex. The estate is now the UK Cat Centre.

In 2008, the charity was affected by the financial markets crisis emanating from Iceland, losing £11.2 million of its financial reserves. In 2012, having suffered continuing financial losses, the charity was forced to make over 80 employees redundant, the majority of these working on the operational front line in adoption centres or supporting teams.
