= Grotius Society =

The Grotius Society was a British society founded in 1915 during World War I. In 1958, it was dissolved on the merger with the Society of Comparative Legislation, founded in 1895, to form the British Institute of International and Comparative Law.

The society's objectives were "to afford facilities for discussion of the Laws of War and Peace, and for interchange of opinions regarding their operation, and to make suggestions for their reform, and generally to advance the study of international law."

Members had to be British subjects, but the society undertook work for the International Law Association.

== Transactions of the Grotius Society ==
Minutes and other notes from the meetings of the Grotius Society were kept and later published on behalf of the Society of Comparative Legislation under the title "Transactions of the Grotius Society."

== See also ==
- Hugo Grotius (1583–1645), Dutch jurist
- Thomas Baty (1869–1954), English lawyer, writer and activist
- Transactions of the Grotius Society
