= Care for the Wild International =

UK-based non-governmental organization

- Founded: 1982
- Type: Nonprofit
- Purpose: Wild animal welfare
- Location: Horsham
- Origins: National Society for the Abolition of Cruel Sports
- Region served: Worldwide
- Key people: Bill Jordan (founder), Thelma How (secretary)

Care for the Wild International (CWI) was a British animal welfare organisation that campaigned to protect the welfare of wild animals around the world. Care for the Wild International described its mission as "to stop and prevent the suffering of wild animals of all species" and to "promote investigation into the value of each species in the web of life and particularly the effect that mankind's actions have on wildlife". The CWI was dissolved in 2015 with its funds transferred to the Born Free Foundation.

== History ==
Care for the Wild International was established as Care for the Wild by Bill Jordan in 1982 from his bookshop in Horsham, West Sussex. It had obtained assets from the National Society for the Abolition of Cruel Sports. It registered as a charity in 1984. In 1985, Care for the Wild was considered an official wildlife division of the National Society for the Abolition of Cruel Sports. Thelma How was its secretary. Patrick Moore a supporter of Care for the Wild sent out letters in 1985, asking local authorities to ban fox hunting.

As the charity grew, it moved to new premises but was still based in Horsham. It became an international organisation with an annual income of over £700,000, using the money to fund projects and campaigns both in the United Kingdom and overseas.

== Mission ==
The stated aim of Care for the Wild International was to "rescue, protect and defend animals in need around the globe". It helped fund rescue centres and animal sanctuaries caring for abandoned, injured and orphaned wild animals in the United Kingdom and in Africa. It operated an "adoption" scheme under which donors could target their donations towards specific objectives. Protection of wildlife was done through supporting projects such as anti-poaching patrols and campaigns against the use of snares. It aimed to educate people about the importance of their local wildlife and on the way to minimise conflicts between people and animals. Care for the Wild International joined other campaigning organisations taking part in both local actions, such as opposing badger culling, and international actions to limit the trade in endangered species.

== Projects and campaigns ==
The stance of Care for the Wild International on the poaching of elephants was backed by its funding of anti-poaching patrols and an elephant orphanage coupled with a re-release programme. This it does in association with the David Sheldrick Wildlife Trust in Kenya which manages an orphanage for motherless elephants and rhinoceroses.

In April 2005, Care for the Wild International joined with the Wildlife Trust of India to confront the 14th Dalai Lama about the trade in tiger skins in Tibet, a campaign that changed attitudes in Tibet on the use of tiger pelts as clothing.

Another campaign has endeavoured to prevent the sale of live turtles as food at Tesco supermarkets in China. Other campaigns have targeted the poaching of rhinoceroses for their horns, and the trade in ivory in the United States which imports large quantities of illegal ivory from poached elephants and which CITES has described as an "ivory trade problem country".

Care for the Wild International joined with the Center for Biological Diversity to produce a report "Extinction: It’s Not Just for Polar Bears" which describes the effects that climate change is having on the Arctic. The report describes the changes taking place in the Arctic and what species are affected. It also provides an action plan for mitigating the problem. Other scientific reports have covered the ivory trade, the Chinese fur industry, the fate of tigers, the evidence supporting badger culling, the impact that hunting bushmeat has on primate populations and the management of elephants in South Africa.
