= Shanghai Children's Welfare Institute =

Orphanage in Shanghai, China

Children's Welfare Institute (CWI) is an orphanage located in Shanghai, China. It is the city's oldest and largest specialized state run orphanage and has been used by the central government as a model for orphanages throughout the country. It was used as a showcase orphanage for China.

== History ==
Shanghai CWI was formerly the New Public Child Care Hall, established in 1911. The municipal government of Shanghai took charge of the New Public Child Care Hall in January 1956, and renamed it the Shanghai Child Care Institute. In July 1964, it was renamed the Shanghai Child Welfare Institute as a branch of the Shanghai Social Welfare Center.

== Structure and care ==
=== Acceptance ===
Children who are placed in these institutions have the following criteria: orphans below the age of fourteen, without relatives or friends available to provide care, infants who have been abandoned, and children below the age of thirteen whose parents are Shanghai citizens but are legally prevented from being able to care for their children and who are without relatives and friends.

=== Discharge ===
Able-bodied children are employed after age sixteen, disabled children are transferred to another welfare institute after the age of fourteen. Abandoned children or orphans can be either sent for adoption or reunited with their birth families.

== Criticism of abuse ==
Many acts of brutality by child care workers and other staff occurred. Infant and child fatality for the orphanage is high. Abuses were recorded by Human Rights Watch. The exposing of the abuse in international news media led China to go into damage control mode.

=== Cases of abuse ===
- Yue Yi (August 1988), Yue Yi, a fifteen-year-old boy with one congenitally disabled leg, was physically beaten and assaulted by orphanage staff, and was locked in a disused building for several days.
- Hong Na (April 1991) Hong Na, a six-year-old girl with a disfiguring birthmark, suffered abuse from a senior staff member, being beaten with a wooden pole, shoe, and punched.
- Liang Jie (April 1991) Liang Jie, a ten-year-old boy with disabled legs, was forced to swallow magnets for reporting abuse on another child.
- Wu Lanyin (July 1991), Wu Lanyin was a fifteen-year-old disabled girl who was forced to menstruate on a spittoon for half an hour.
- Lu Yi (August 1991) Lu Yi, a fourteen-year-old boy, was tortured by a female orphanage child care worker. Li Laidi tied Lu Yi up in standing position, and stabbed his genitals with a yacha (a metal fork on a bamboo pole), ordering other children to pull on his pubic hair, and she forced him to jump while tied.
- Fu Qing (1985) Fu Qing, a girl born in 1975, was sexually abused when she was ten by orphanage staff.
- Xiang Wen (1987) Xiang Wen, a girl born in 1973, was also sexually abused by a staff worker.
- Wang Guang (1993) Wang Guang was raped and forced to undergo an abortion by the institute.
- Huo Zhen (February 1991), Hue Zhen, a boy had a severe spinal curvature, and contracted hepatitis. He and two other boys with hepatitis were tied to beds and left unattended, and died.
- Gan Rui (October 1991_ Gan Rui, a girl born in 1979, contracted acute nephritis and was ignored by medical staff. She received no visitors or supplies.
- Wei Zhi (June 1992), Wei Zhi, a boy aged about five years, was injured on June twenty, 1992, when a girl nearly severed his penis with a pair of scissors. The injury was crudely stitched, the penis developed gangrene and part of it dropped off, requiring more stitches.
- Zhang Yangsong (April/May 1980) Zhang Yansong, a girl born in 1982 suffering from cerebral palsy, had her leg broken in 1989 by a medical employee, and the bone fused crookedly, leaving a permanent limp.
