= Urania (journal) =

British feminist journal (1916–1940)

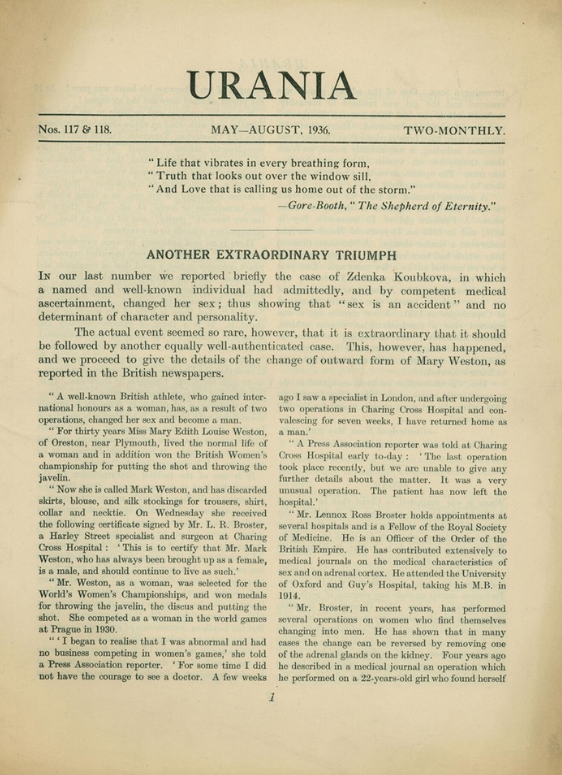
- Front page of the May–August 1936 issue
- Principal editor: Irene Clyde
- Categories: Feminism; Gender variance
- Frequency: Bimonthly (1916–1920); three times yearly (1921–1940)
- Circulation: Approximately 250
- Founder: Eva Gore-Booth; Esther Roper; Irene Clyde; Dorothy Cornish; Jessey Wade
- First issue: 1916
- Final issue Number: 1940; 142
- Country: United Kingdom
- Language: English

Urania was a privately circulated British feminist journal issued from 1916 to 1940. It was established by Irene Clyde (a name used by the lawyer Thomas Baty), Eva Gore-Booth, Esther Roper, Dorothy Cornish and Jessey Wade. The journal rejected fixed distinctions between men and women, opposed conventional gender roles and heterosexual marriage, and reported on same-sex relationships, gender variance and changes in biological sex.

Urania appeared every two months in 1919 and 1920 and subsequently in three combined issues per year. It was printed in India and circulated free of charge to a small network of readers in Britain and abroad. Much of its content consisted of extracts from newspapers and books, alongside original essays, poetry and correspondence. Historians have examined the journal in relation to lesbian history, feminism, early accounts of gender nonconformity and the religious ideas of some of its contributors.

== History and circulation ==
=== Origins and editors ===
The journal developed from the Aëthnic Union, a feminist organisation founded by 1911 that opposed the division of humanity into fixed sexes. Its members included Clyde, Gore-Booth, Roper, Cornish and Wade. In the union, they discussed the social effects of sexual differentiation, including distinctions imposed through education, marriage and customary behaviour.

The group established Urania in 1916. Gore-Booth and Roper were partners and participants in the women's suffrage and labour movements. Wade was active in animal protection, while Cornish was a novelist and advocate of Montessori education. Clyde, an international lawyer who moved to Japan in 1916, became the journal's principal continuing editor.

A retrospective account published in Urania after Gore-Booth's death in 1926 credited Gore-Booth with formulating its declaration that sex was accidental rather than essential to individual nature. It stated that Gore-Booth and Roper had agreed to associate their names with the journal and had edited its third issue during the First World War. Their involvement therefore differed from Clyde's continuing responsibility for much of the publication's original writing and editorial commentary.

=== Printing and readership ===
Urania was privately printed by D. R. Mitra at the Manoranjan Press in Bombay. It was not sold publicly; a notice in the journal explained that copies could be obtained by friends of the enterprise. Oram describes a network of correspondents and supporters who were invited to register their interest and send material to the editors. The circulation was reported at approximately 250 copies. Copies reached college libraries in Oxford, Cambridge and the United States, although the journal was reportedly excluded from some Oxford women's colleges.

In 1919 and 1920, six issues appeared each year. From 1921 the journal issued three combined numbers annually, a change attributed to the cost of printing. The surviving collection at The Women's Library begins with issue 13, dated January–February 1919; the first twelve issues are not included in that run. The last surviving numbers, 139–142, appeared in two combined issues covering January–August 1940.

== Content and ideas ==
=== Sex, gender and the body ===
The journal rejected the belief that sexual differences should determine people's characters, capacities or social roles. Each issue carried the declaration "There are no 'men' or 'women' in Urania", and the editors repeatedly used the principle "Sex is an accident". The journal's founding statement called for the rejection of the dual organisation of humanity.

Much of Urania reproduced accounts from the international press concerning people who crossed gender boundaries, women undertaking activities traditionally reserved for men, and cases described as changes of sex. It also covered intersex people and developments in medical and scientific understandings of sex. Steele describes the selection and republication of reports from different countries as a means of documenting challenges to prevailing assumptions about gender and compulsory heterosexuality.

The journal's rejection of fixed sexes did not entail a rejection of qualities conventionally described as feminine. The contributors often preferred tenderness and gentleness to aggression, which they associated with masculinity. T. Maait Pepperell identifies the cultivation of femininity as one of the recurring ideals of the journal, alongside education and pacifism. Literary scholar Jana Funke also discusses the tension between the journal's criticism of sexual differentiation and Clyde's idealisation of femininity.

=== Marriage, celibacy and relationships between women ===
Urania challenged the institution of heterosexual marriage, which its contributors regarded as reinforcing distinct roles for men and women. Historian Sonja Tiernan argues that the journal advanced celibacy in heterosexual relations while presenting intimate relationships between women as an alternative to marriage. In 1919 it reproduced a defence of unmarried women's lives under the title "Do Unmarried Women Miss the Half of Life?". The article contrasted the opportunities of unmarried women with the domestic responsibilities expected of married women.

The journal published accounts of relationships between women from literature and history. These included a passage from Katharine Tynan's reminiscences, entitled "An Irish School-Girl", describing an intense attachment between schoolgirls. In 1933 Clyde wrote "Queen Christina", an article describing Queen Christina of Sweden's reported relationships with women, including Ebba Sparre.

Clyde also wrote a 1934 article entitled "Marriage", signed "I. C.", arguing that the institution maintained artificial distinctions between masculine and feminine character. Clyde's book Eve's Sour Apples, published in the same year, similarly criticised heterosexual marriage and conventional expectations of motherhood. Pepperell interprets Clyde's position as favouring affectionate and chaste partnerships between women over heterosexual sexual relationships.

=== Pacifism, education and other reforms ===
The journal's contributors also addressed pacifism, education and animal protection. In the aftermath of the First World War, Urania printed poems and accounts of wartime suffering, including writings by Israel Zangwill and the journalist William G. Shepherd. Clyde criticised the destructive effects of warfare and the growth of large militarised states. The journal associated peace with the cultivation of qualities it described as feminine.

Education was another recurring subject. Clyde opposed teaching children different social roles according to sex and argued that simply putting boys and girls in the same school would not constitute genuine coeducation if their activities remained segregated. Cornish advocated Montessori methods and proposed an education centred on children's imagination, music, language and affection. In 1923, the journal published Cornish's proposals for a community and school organised around these principles.

Pepperell also identifies vegetarianism and concern for animals among the interests shared by several of the journal's founders, particularly Wade, Clyde and Gore-Booth. The social arrangements envisioned in its pages included vegetarian living alongside non-gendered education and opposition to violence.

=== Religious influences and editorial differences ===
Religious and spiritual ideas appeared alongside the journal's social and political arguments. Jenny White notes that early issues carried a Greek biblical phrase referring to angels in heaven, drawn from a passage about marriage after death. Tiernan connects Gore-Booth's rejection of fixed sexual identity with an interest in Theosophy, particularly its teachings about reincarnation and the possibility that a soul might inhabit bodies of different sexes in successive lives. These arguments concerned Gore-Booth's thinking and did not necessarily represent the beliefs of all the journal's contributors.

Differences of opinion appeared in the journal despite its shared opposition to sexual differentiation. Pepperell examines essays published in 1919 under the name "Theta", attributed to Clyde, which defended aristocratic social values and criticised egalitarian attitudes towards class. The journal noted that one such essay represented Theta's own views rather than those of the editorial group. Pepperell argues that the tension between the journal's egalitarian position on sex and Clyde's views on class complicated its proposals for an alternative society.

== Preservation and scholarship ==
The Women's Library at the London School of Economics holds surviving issues of Urania from 1919 to 1940. These were digitised and made available through the LSE Digital Library in 2023.

Scholars including Alison Oram, Karen Steele and Sonja Tiernan have examined the journal's opposition to heterosexual marriage and conventional sexual categories. Steele interprets its assembled newspaper reports as a form of historical record of lesbian lives, cross-dressing and sex variance, while Tiernan relates its arguments to Gore-Booth's feminism and religious writings. T. Maait Pepperell has investigated the journal's connection with the Aëthnic Union and the differences among its contributors over the kind of society they wished to create.

== See also ==
- The Freewoman – Defunct feminist weekly review
- Das 3. Geschlecht – First transvestite magazine published in Weimar Germany from 1930 to 1932
