= Esther Roper =

English suffragist (1868–1938)

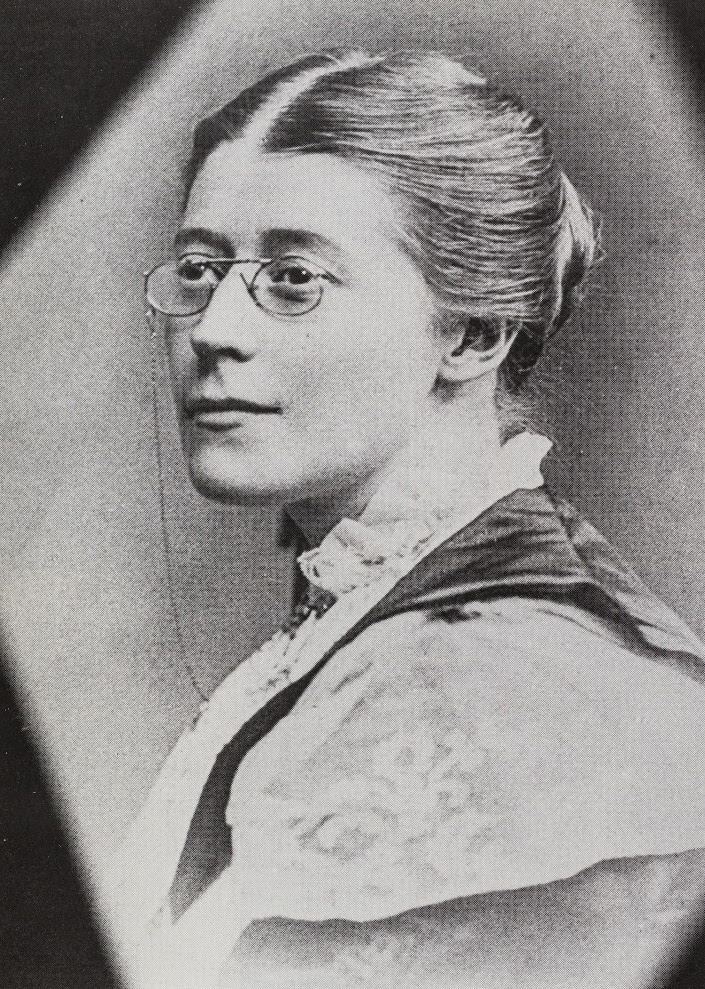
- Roper as a student at Owens College, c. 1892
- Born: 4 August 1868; Chorley, Lancashire, England
- Died: 28 April 1938 (aged 69); Hampstead, London, England
- Resting place: St John-at-Hampstead
- Occupations: Organiser, suffragist
- Partner: Eva Gore-Booth

Esther Roper (4 August 1868 – 28 April 1938) was a suffragist and social justice campaigner who fought for equal employment and voting rights for working-class women.

== Early life and education ==
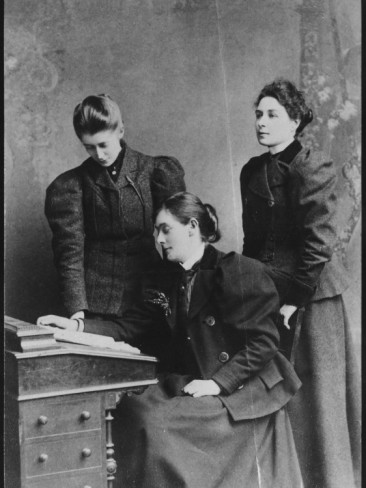
Roper (seated), Edith Palliser (left), Mrs. Blaxter (right)

Esther Roper was born near Chorley, Lancashire, on 4 August 1868. She was the daughter of Edward Roper, a factory hand who later became a missionary, and Annie Roper, the daughter of Irish immigrants. She was educated by the Church Missionary Society.

She was one of the first women to study for a degree at Owens College in Manchester. In 1886 she was admitted as part of a trial scheme to establish whether females could study without harm to their mental or physical health. In 1897 with fellow student Marion Ledward, she founded and edited Iris, a newsletter for female students. Issued twice yearly until 1894, the publication highlighted issues impacting on women’s education, and encouraged networking between current and former students.

In 1891 Roper graduated from Owen’s College with a First Class honours degree in Latin, English Literature and Political Economy. She maintained links with the college, becoming a leading member of its women-only Social Debating Society. In 1895 she helped establish the Manchester University Settlement in Ancoats to offer education and cultural opportunities to the local working poor. She was elected to its executive committee in 1896.

== Women's suffrage work ==
From 1893 until 1905, she held the salaried position of secretary of the Manchester National Society for Women’s Suffrage. Roper is credited with re-energising the organisation’s work which had lacked direction since the death of previous secretary Lydia Becker. Roper broadened the scope of the MNSWS votes for women campaign, steering the focus away from securing the interests of middle-class women, to actively seeking out the involvement of working-class women as petition signatories and speakers for the cause. In 1897, the MNSWS changed its name to the North of England Society for Women’s Suffrage (NESWS) and became part of the National Union of Women's Suffrage Societies.

== Meeting Eva Gore-Booth ==
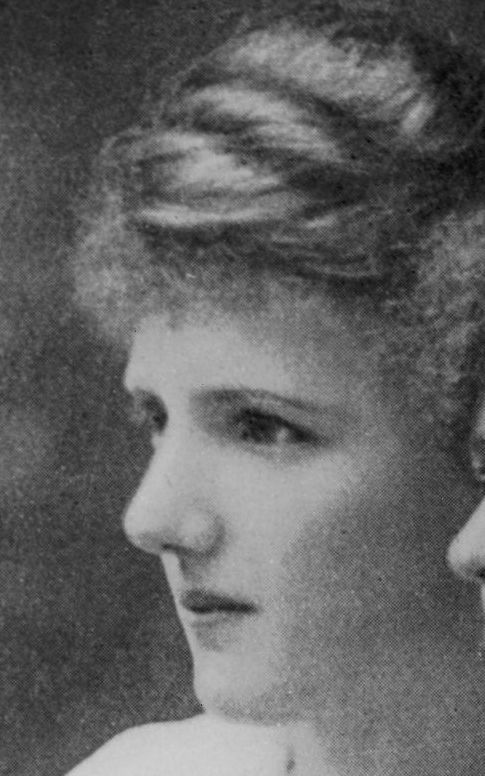
Eva Gore-Booth, Roper's partner

In 1896, suffering from exhaustion Roper holidayed at Scottish writer George Macdonald's guest house in Italy. There she met Irish poet and aristocrat Eva Gore-Booth. The couple fell in love, and the following year Gore-Booth gave up a life of privilege to move in with Roper in a terraced house in Rusholme, Manchester. Roper later wrote of their meeting in Italy: "For months illness kept us in the south, and we spent the days walking and talking on the hillside by the sea. Each was attracted to the work and thoughts of the other, and we soon became friends and companions for life". Roper and Gore-Booth were vegetarians.

== Social justice and suffrage work with Eva Gore-Booth ==
In the late 1800s and early 1900s Roper and Gore-Booth helped to organize groups of female flower-sellers, circus performers, barmaids and coal pit-brow workers as their right to work was threatened by moral crusades and new legislation. They arranged public meetings, demonstrations and delegations to parliament. Roper and Gore-Booth argued that women’s livelihoods were at stake, that women were capable of making their own decisions about how they were employed, and working women’s lack of vote left them disempowered in the workplace. In 1900 they founded and edited the Women's Labour News. This quarterly publication aimed at uniting women workers ran until 1904.

In 1903, the couple helped to found the Lancashire and Cheshire Women's Textile and Other Workers Representation Committee, which organized the campaign of the first women's suffrage candidate to stand in a general election. In 1905, Roper became secretary of the National Industrial & Professional Women's Suffrage Society. From 1906 Roper and Gore-Booth distanced themselves from Pankhurst's Women’s Social and Political Union. They disagreed with the use of militant tactics and Emmeline Pankhurst's lack of interest in campaigning for working-class women's rights.

In 1913 Roper and Gore-Booth moved to London for the sake of Eva's health. In 1916, along with trans woman Irene Clyde, they founded Urania, a privately circulated journal which expressed their pioneering views on gender and sexuality. Published six times a year it contained clippings of articles from national and international press as well as original pieces.

They were prominent pacifists during the First World War, working in the International Committee of Women for Permanent Peace. Among other things they helped support the wives and children of imprisoned conscientious objectors. After the war they became members of the Committee for the Abolition of Capital Punishment and worked for prison reform.

== Later years and death ==
Grave of Roper and Eva Gore-Booth at St John-at-Hampstead.

After Gore-Booth's death in 1926, Roper worked to preserve her partner's memory. She edited and introduced both The Poems of Eva Gore-Booth (1929) and The Prison Letters of Countess Markievicz (1934). Roper commissioned artist Ethel Rhind to create a stained glass window commemorating Eva’s life. It was unveiled in June 1928 at the re-opening of the University Settlement Roundhouse building on Every Street, Ancoats. The Roundhouse was demolished in 1986, by which time the window had been lost or stolen.

In later years Roper continued her social justice campaigning. She was signatory on a number of letters to The Times newspaper concerning equal treatment for men and women in employment. Roper died of heart failure at her home in April 1938. She was buried alongside Gore-Booth in St John's churchyard, Hampstead, on 30 April, with a quote from lesbian icon Sappho carved on their gravestone. Constance Markievicz, Gore-Booth's sister, wrote of her: "The more one knows her, the more one loves her, and I feel so glad Eva and she were together, and so thankful that her love was with Eva to the end."

== Posthumous recognition ==
Roper's name and picture (and those of 58 other women's suffrage supporters) are on the plinth of the statue of Millicent Fawcett in Parliament Square, London, unveiled in 2018.
