= Sonja Tiernan =

Irish professor of Irish history in New Zealand

Academic background
- Education: University College Dublin
- Thesis: The literary life of Eva Gore-Booth (1870-1926) (2007)

Sonja Tiernan is an Irish–New Zealand academic, and is a full professor at the University of Otago, specialising in modern Irish history and gender politics.

== Academic career ==
Tiernan is originally from Dun Laoghaire, Dublin. She completed a PhD titled The literary life of Eva Gore-Booth (1870-1926) at the University College Dublin. Tiernan was an associate professor at Liverpool Hope University before she was appointed the Eamon Cleary Professor of Irish Studies at the University of Otago in 2019. Tiernan is Co-Director, with Professor Liam McIlvanney, of the Centre for Irish and Scottish Studies.

Tiernan's research focuses on modern Irish history, including gender politics and social history. She has published several books on Irish women, including a biography of writer and activist Eva Gore-Booth, a history of marriage equality in Ireland, and two volumes of Irish women's speeches. When the first volume of speeches was published, it sold so well it had to be reprinted four times in the first month. The book includes speeches by 33 women, including a speech by trade unionist Harriet Morison.

After arriving in New Zealand, Tiernan was commissioned by the Embassy of Ireland to research historical and cultural links between New Zealand and Ireland. Her study included what is probably the first translation of the Proclamation of the Irish Republic into Maori.

== Honours and award ==
In 2018 Tiernan was awarded the inaugural Library Research Award by the Keough-Naughton Institute of Irish Studies at the University of Notre Dame.

== Selected works ==
=== Books ===
- Sonja Tiernan, Eva Gore-Booth : An image of such politics. Manchester : Manchester University Press, 2016 - 296 p. - ISBN 9780719094996 . Casalini id: 5245790
- Tiernan, S. (2021). Irish women's speeches: Voices that rocked the system. Dublin, Ireland: University College Dublin Press, 370p.
- Tiernan, S. (2022). Irish women's speeches (Vol. II): A rich chorus of voices. Dublin, Ireland: University College Dublin Press, 300p.
- Tiernan, S. (2020). History of marriage equality in Ireland: A social revolution begins. Manchester, UK: Manchester University Press, 192p.

=== Journal articles ===
- Sonja Tiernan, ‘The Politics of Lesbian Fiction: Sonja Tiernan Interviews Novelist Sarah Waters’, Irish Feminist Review 2 (2006), 148–64 (p. 149)
- Tiernan, Sonja (2019). "Markievicz: prison letters & rebel writings". Women's History Review. 28 (3): 520–521. doi:10.1080/09612025.2019.1576287. Wikidata Q124398085.
- Tiernan, Sonja (26 January 2021), “NO CONSCRIPTION NOW! OR AFTER THE HARVEST”: Remembering Women and Anti-conscription in Ireland and England, Indiana University Press, pp. 107–123, doi:10.2307/j.ctv1ghv4bd.10, Wikidata Q124398081
- Tiernan, Sonja (17 August 2022), ‘A political nonentity with infants, criminals, and lunatics’, pp. 234–247, doi:10.4324/9781003164944-23, Wikidata Q124398080
- Tiernan, Sonja (20 August 2022), ‘Two girls in silk kimonos’:, Royal Irish Academy, pp. 125–146, doi:10.2307/j.ctv30dxxq7.11, Wikidata Q124398079
- Tiernan, Sonja (2023). "Patrick McDonagh. Gay and Lesbian Activism in the Republic of Ireland, 1973–93". The American Historical Review. 128 (1): 451–452. doi:10.1093/ahr/rhad080. Wikidata Q124398078.
- Tiernan, Sonja (2011). "Challenging Presumptions of Heterosexuality: Eva Gore-Booth, A Biographical Case Study". Historical Reflections. 37 (2). doi:10.3167/hrrh.2011.370205. Wikidata Q56454287.
