= Eva Gore-Booth =

Irish writer and suffragist (1870–1926)

- Born: Eva Selina Laura Gore-Booth; 22 May 1870; Lissadell House, County Sligo, Ireland
- Died: 30 June 1926 (aged 56); Hampstead, London, England
- Resting place: St John-at-Hampstead
- Occupations: Poet; dramatist
- Partner: Esther Roper
- Father: Sir Henry Gore-Booth, 5th Baronet
- Relatives: Constance Markievicz (sister); Casimir Markievicz (brother-in-law); Sir Robert Gore-Booth, 4th Baronet (grandfather)

Eva Selina Laura Gore-Booth (22 May 1870 – 30 June 1926) was an Irish poet, theologian, dramatist, and committed suffragist and labour activist.

== Family background and early life ==
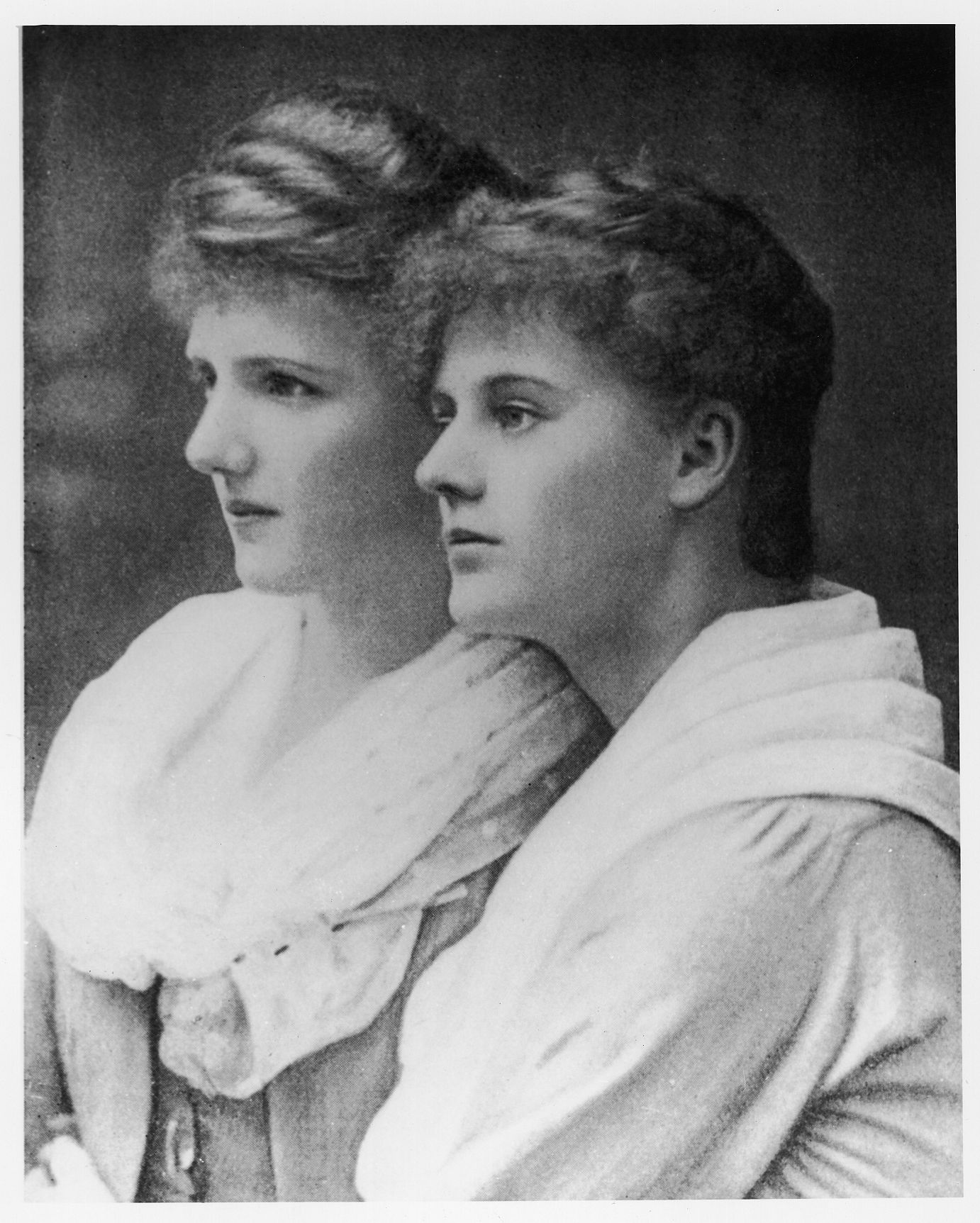
Gore-Booth and her sister Constance Markievicz

Gore-Booth was born Eva Selina Laura Gore-Booth on 22 May 1870 at Lissadell House, County Sligo to Henry Gore-Booth, (later Sir Henry Gore-Booth, 5th Baronet) and Georgina Mary Gore-Booth (née Hill, later Lady Georgina Mary Gore-Booth).The third of five siblings, Gore-Booth was the younger sister of the republican politician, suffragist and labour activist Constance Markievicz. Following the 1876 death of her paternal grandfather Sir Robert Gore-Booth, 4th Baronet, an Anglo-Irish politician and landowner, Gore-Booth's father became the 5th Baronet of Artarman and took over the running of the family estate.

Both Eva and Constance were educated at home and had several governesses throughout their childhood, most notably Miss Noel who recorded most of what is known about Gore-Booth's early life. She learned French, German, Latin and Greek and developed a love of poetry that was instilled by her maternal grandmother. Gore-Booth was troubled by the stark contrast between her family's privileged life and the poverty outside Lissadell, particularly during the winter of the Irish Famine (1879) when starving tenants would come to the house begging for food and clothing. Esther Roper later remarked that Gore-Booth was "haunted by the suffering of the world and had a curious feeling of responsibility for its inequalities and injustices."

Gore-Booth's father was a notable Arctic explorer and, during a period of absence from the estate in the 1870s, her mother, Lady Georgina, established a school of needlework for women at Lissadell. The women were trained in crochet, embroidery and darn-thread work and the sale of their wares allowed them to earn a wage of 18 shillings per week. This enterprise had a great influence on Gore-Booth and her later women's suffrage and trade union work.

In 1894, Gore-Booth joined her father on his travels around North America and the West Indies. She kept diaries and documented their travels in "Jamaica, Barbados, Cuba, Florida, New Orleans, St Louis, San Francisco, Vancouver, Toronto, Niagara, Montreal and Quebec." On returning to Ireland she met the poet W. B. Yeats for the first time. The following year she traveled around Europe with her mother, sister Constance, and friend Rachel Mansfield and, while in Venice, fell ill with a respiratory condition. In 1896, while recuperating at the villa of writer George MacDonald and his wife in Bordighera, Italy, she met Esther Roper, the English woman who would become her lifelong companion. Roper was also the secretary of the North of England Society for Women's Suffrage. Believing that she was dying of tuberculosis, Gore-Booth and Roper settled in Manchester to serve working women throughout the remainder of her life.

Gore-Booth became a vegetarian in 1900.

== Political work ==
The work of Eva Gore-Booth, alongside that of Esther Roper was responsible for the close link between the struggle for women's rights in industry and the struggle for women's right to vote. As a middle class suffragist representing Manchester, the work of Gore-Booth was mainly recognized in the Lancashire cotton towns from 1899 to 1913. Her struggle began when Gore-Booth became a member of the executive committee of the National Union of Women's Suffrage Societies. Carrying out work at the Ancoats settlement, Gore-Booth became co-secretary of the Manchester and Salford Women's Trade Union Council. During her time in Manchester, she also acted as a mentor to British suffragist Christabel Pankhurst.

1902 saw Eva Gore-Booth campaigning at the Clitheroe by-election on behalf of David Shackleton, a Labour candidate who promised Eva that he would show support for women's enfranchisement. Shackleton was elected yet he did not act upon the promise he had made to Eva. This led to the founding of the Lancashire and Cheshire Women Textile and Other Worker's Representation Committee by Gore-Booth, Esther Roper and Sarah Reddish. The setting up of this committee led to Gore-Booth meeting Christabel Pankhurst who was also campaigning for women's rights. However, in 1904, Christabel caused some controversy in the Women's Trade Union Council when she attempted to force the council to make women's suffrage one of its aims. They refused. This led to the resignation of Gore-Booth from the council. Resigning from that particular council, Gore-Booth alongside Sarah Dickenson who had also resigned, set up the Manchester and Salford Women's Trade and Labour Council. As part of this council, Eva and other suffragists used constitutional methods of campaigning. In the general election of 1906, they put forward their own candidate, Thorley Smith but he was defeated. In May 1906 Gore-Booth was present in the suffrage deputation to Campbell Bannerman. Her feeling of helplessness after the failure of this deputation was captured in two of her poems. These poems were entitled 'Women's Trades on the Embankment' and 'A Lost Opportunity'.

In 1907 Gore-Booth, reluctant to give up hope, contributed an essay "The Women's Suffrage Movement Among Trade Unionists" to The Case for Women's Suffrage. In this essay Eva gave a summary of reasons for the methods of the LCWTOW campaign to gain a vote for working women. In 1908 Eva was a delegate to the Labour Party Conference at Hull where she proposed a motion in favour of women's suffrage. This motion was defeated in favour of one for adult suffrage. The end of 1909 saw Eva Gore-Booth helping to run the radical suffragist general election campaign at Rossendale where once again a candidate was put forward but was defeated. In 1910, Gore-Booth showed her support for the New Constitutional Society For Women's Suffrage and in 1911 with Roper, she attended a meeting in London of the Fabian Women's Group. Also in 1911, she participated in the suffragette 1911 census boycott, and on 17 November of the same year she was a member of the deputation representing the working women of the north of England. This deputation called upon Lloyd George not to drop the Conciliation Bill. 1911 was also the year that Eva put herself in the shoes of the working women when she worked for a short time as a pit-brow lass to sample the working conditions for herself. However, as war broke out, Gore-Booth and Roper took up welfare work among German women and children in England. In December 1913, Gore-Booth signed the "Open Christmas Letter" to women of Germany and Austria. 1915 then saw Eva Gore-Booth become a member of the Women's Peace Crusade and in 1916 the No-Conscription Fellowship.

Gore-Booth continued to work for peace, writing poetry and for a privately circulated journal, Urania, for the rest of her life.

== Poetry ==
When Gore-Booth was embarking on her writing career she was visited by W. B. Yeats who was very much taken with her work. In his own letters he states that he sent her a book to inspire her. Yeats was hoping that she would take up his cause of writing Irish tales to enchant and amuse. Instead Gore-Booth takes Irish folklore and put emphasis on the females in the story. Her widely discussed sexuality in later years is never declared but her poetry reflects it quite overtly. In her Triumph of Maeve she makes a minor scene between Maeve and a wise woman almost erotic. While in her legend of Deirdre she subverts the masculine nationalist identity of Ireland's heroic tales. In her early work she uses the same poetic devices that her male counterparts do such as writing a love poem to the goddess of Nature. In these she does not take a male voice though. She is writing love verse from one woman to another. Gore-Booth was also one of a group of editors of the magazine Urania that published issues three times a year from 1916 to 1940. It was a feminist magazine that reprinted stories and poems from all over the world with editorial comment. A lot of prominent New Woman authors including Mona Caird were involved with the project. Each issue declared that sex was an accident and there were no intrinsic characteristics of the female or the male. Many New Woman issues were discussed such as gender equality, suffrage and marriage but Gore-Booth went further than that to write poetry about women loving women. Even the title of the magazine Urania can refer to heavenly or Uranian another term for homosexual. Gore-Booth and Roper allowed their names to be used in connection with the periodical and Gore-Booth was considered to be an inspiration for Urania.

== Later life and death ==
Grave of Gore-Booth and Esther Roper at St John-at-Hampstead.

Meeting political activist Roper in Italy in 1896, where Gore-Booth was sent to recover from respiratory ailments, was a deciding factor in Gore-Booth's active involvement in women's rights of the suffrage movement. The two women formed a strong attachment during the weeks spent together at the villa of writer George MacDonald and his wife in Bordighera which led to a partnership, privately and professionally, until Eva's death in June 1926. How intimate her relations were with Roper is controversially discussed; however, letters and poems Gore-Booth dedicated to Roper suggest a romantic love between the two women. One of those poems appears in a collection of her poetic work "The Travellers, To E.G.R" which was published by Roper in 1929 and in which she uses analogies of music and song to express how deeply she was struck by her partner's personality and charisma.

After years of playing a lead role in the Women's Suffrage Movement and fighting for equality of women's rights in the UK as well as staying true to her literary roots, Gore-Booth and Roper relocated to London from Manchester in 1913 due to Gore-Booth's deteriorating respiratory health. During World War I, Gore-Booth and Roper were actively involved in the British Peace Movement along with fellow suffragists, such as Sylvia Pankhurst and Emily Hobhouse. At the Women's International Congress which took place at the city of Hague in 1915, she jointly composed an open Christmas letter entitled "To the Women of Germany & Austria" urging to "... join hands with the women of neutral countries, and urge our rulers to stay further bloodshed..." and appealing to a sense of sisterhood to prevent further atrocities and the war from escalating.

Just weeks after the 1916 Rising, Gore-Booth traveled to Dublin accompanied by Roper and was pivotal in the efforts to reprieve the death sentence of her sister Constance Markievicz awarded for her instrumental role in the 1916 Rising. This was successfully converted to a life sentence. Her poetry composed during this period reflects the personal trauma and horror she was exposed to visiting her sister in solitary confinement. She further campaigned to abolish the death sentence overall and to reform prison standards and attended the trial of Irish nationalist and fellow poet Roger Casement thus showing solidarity and support for the overturning of his death sentence.

During the remaining years of her life, which was claimed by cancer on 30 June 1926, she remained devoted to her poetry, dedicated time to her artistic talents as a painter, studied the Greek language and was known as an anti-vivisectionist and supporter of animal welfare. She also became a Theosophist and animal rights activist. Gore-Booth died in her home in Hampstead, London she shared with Roper until her death. She was buried alongside Roper in St John's churchyard, Hampstead.

== Sexuality ==
Gore-Booth's sexuality has been a topic for debate among academics, and it is increasingly considered that she and Esther Roper were in a same-sex relationship, while some believe that the two women merely cohabited.

After being told that she was close to death in 1896 Gore-Booth took a trip to the home of George MacDonald in Bordighera, Italy, to recuperate. It was there where she met Esther Roper who was also recovering from illness. They formed a strong mutual bond and were partners in life and work from then on. After the time they spent there together Gore-Booth further rejected her privileged rural life in Ireland and moved into the urban Manchester environment. There she purchased property with Roper, who became her partner in her sexual politics activism and suffrage work. Although Gore-Booth and Roper lived together till Eva's death they slept in different rooms and there is no way of proving or disproving a sexual relationship or any sort of sexual encounters between them. However, it was also commonplace in this era for married couples (particularly among the upper class) to have separate bedrooms so this detail is superfluous. After knowing each other for four years Gore-Booth made Roper the sole beneficiary of her estate.

Both Gore-Booth and Roper worked with a team of professionals to establish and edit Urania, a sexual politics journal that was circulated between 1916 and 1940. The formation was due to the editors being connected through a feminist revolutionary group known as the Aëthnic Union which was formed in 1911. Urania was a radical journal that contributed to the discussion on sexual politics of the Suffrage era. It was established to document and enhance the progress of the first wave feminist movement. Its aim was to promote the elimination of the glorification of heterosexual marriage and sex and gender distinctions altogether. It also became a point of reference for those worldwide who shared the editors' radical, Uranian Philosophy. 'Sex is an Accident' a term coined by Gore-Booth regarding biological gender distinction was used to sum up the Uranian philosophy.

The journal for most of its publication was privately circulated worldwide but was sent free to anyone who requested it to establish a network and register of supporters. Gore-Booth was seen as the figure head and founder of this journal as it tied into her theosophical feminist beliefs. Urania was ranged from eight to sixteen pages of compositions, magazines clippings, extracts and reports about sex changes and scientific methods, lesbian women in history as well as challenging and overcoming society's gender norms.

Urania monitored birth and marriage rates worldwide and celebrated when the rates fell. It also promoted the idea of same-sex love being the ideal particularly between females and it being spiritual in nature rather than physical. Throughout all this discussion Gore-Booth was noted in Urania as an inspiration and her words and her poetry was quoted in it long after her death.

Gore-Booth is buried alongside Roper in Hampstead in England and her tombstone reads "Life that is Love is God".

Despite the debate on her sexuality Gore-Booth has been honoured for her work by the LGBT community including an award in her honour at the Dublin Gay Theatre Festival. She has also been acknowledged by the Irish Congress of Trade Unions as LGBT and Worker's Rights role model. Along with Cumann na mBan revolutionary lesbians Kathleen Lynn and Madeleine ffrench-Mullen, Margaret Skinnider and Nora O'Keeffe, and Elizabeth O'Farrell and Julia Grenan, Gore-Booth was featured in a 2023 TG4 documentary about "the radical queer women at the very heart of the Irish Revolution": Croíthe Radacacha (Radical Hearts).

== Posthumous recognition ==
Her name and picture (and those of 58 other women's suffrage supporters) are on the plinth of the statue of Millicent Fawcett in Parliament Square, London, unveiled in 2018.

== Selected publications ==
- Poems (1898)
- Unseen Kings (1904)
- The One and the Many (1904)
- The Three Resurrections and The Triumph of Maeve (1905)
- The Egyptian Pillar (1907)
- The Sorrowful Princess (1907)
- The Agate Lamp (1912)
- Whence Come Wars? (1914)
- Religious Aspects of Non-Resistance (1915)
- The Perilous Light (1915)
- The Death of Fionavar from The Triumph of Maeve (1916)
- Rhythms of Art (1917)
- The Tribunal (1917)
- Broken Glory (1918)
- The Sword of Justice: A Play (1918)
- A Psychological and Poetic Approach to the Study of Christ in the Fourth Gospel (1923)
- The Shepherd of Eternity and other Poems (1925)
- The House of Three Windows (1926)
- The Inner Kingdom (1926)
- The World's Pilgrim (1927)
- The Buried Life of Deirdre (1930)
