= Chrystal Macmillan =

British feminist and pacifist

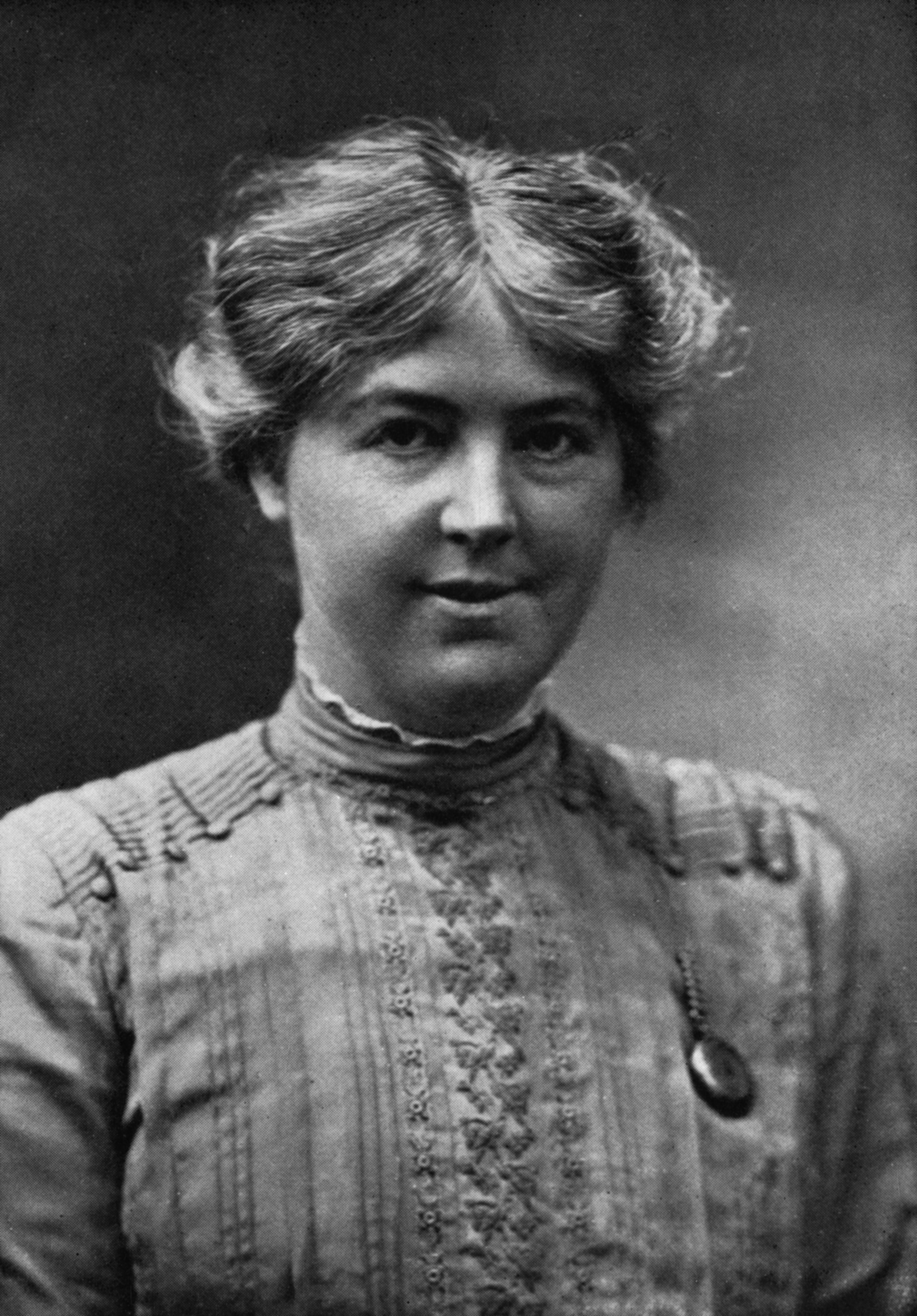
- Born: Jessie Chrystal Macmillan; 13 June 1872; Edinburgh, Scotland
- Died: 21 September 1937 (aged 65); Edinburgh, Scotland
- Resting place: Corstorphine, Edinburgh
- Education: University of Edinburgh
- Occupations: politician, lawyer

Jessie Chrystal Macmillan (13 June 1872 – 21 September 1937) was a British suffragist, peace activist, barrister, feminist and the first female science graduate from the University of Edinburgh as well as that institution's first female honours graduate in mathematics. She was an activist for women's right to vote, and for other women's causes. She was the second woman to plead a case before the House of Lords, and was one of the founders of the Women's International League for Peace and Freedom.

In the first year of World War I, Macmillan spoke for the peace-seeking women of the United Kingdom at the International Congress of Women, a women's congress convened at The Hague. The Congress elected five delegates to take their message to political leaders in Europe and the United States. She travelled to the neutral states of Northern Europe and Russia before meeting up with other delegates in the U.S. She met with world leaders such as President Woodrow Wilson, whose countries were still neutral, to present the proposals formulated at The Hague. Wilson subsequently used these proposals as some of his Fourteen Points, his justification for making war to forge a lasting peace. At war's end, Macmillan helped to organise the second women's congress in Zurich and was one of the delegates elected to take the resolutions passed at the congress to the political leaders meeting in Paris to formulate the Versailles Peace Treaty. She supported the founding of the League of Nations. Macmillan tried but did not succeed in getting the League to establish nationality for women independent of the nationality of their husbands.

== Early career ==
Jessie Chrystal Macmillan was born on 13 June 1872 to Jessie Chrystal (née) Finlayson and John Macmillan, a tea merchant working for Melrose & Co in Leith. The family lived at 8 Duke Street (Dublin Street as of 1922) in Edinburgh's New Town.

Macmillan was the only daughter among her parents' eight sons. After an early education in Edinburgh she boarded at St Leonards School in St Andrews on the east coast of Scotland. In October 1892 Macmillan was among the first female students to enrol at the university, she was however not the first to graduate as others were either more advanced in their studies or taking higher degrees. Macmillan studied science subjects including Honours Mathematics with George Chrystal, Astronomy with Ralph Copeland, and Natural Philosophy with Peter Guthrie Tait and Cargill Gilston Knott. In April 1896 she graduated with a BSc with first-class honours in mathematics and natural philosophy, the first woman at the university to do so.

In the summer of 1896 she went to Berlin for further university study, then returned to Edinburgh and passed an examination in Greek language to enter the Faculty of Arts in October 1896. She studied a number of social subjects including politics, and graduated in April 1900. Macmillan was the first woman to earn First-class honours from Edinburgh in Mathematics and Natural Philosophy, also earning Second-class honours in Moral Philosophy and Logic. During this time she was a member of the Edinburgh Ladies' Debating Society, a forum which helped her gain confidence arguing in the face of opposition. She also joined the Edinburgh Mathematical Society in May 1897, the second woman member after Flora Philip in 1896.

== Women's rights ==
Macmillan was active in the Edinburgh National Society for Women's Suffrage (ENSWS). In 1897, two women's groups in Great Britain united to become the National Union of Women's Suffrage Societies (NUWSS), of whom Macmillan, along with Louisa Stevenson, served as executive committee members from Edinburgh. She was known as Chrystal Macmillan—she did not use the name Jessie, her mother's first name and her own birth name.

As graduates, Macmillan and four other women were full members of the General Council of Edinburgh University, but they were denied the opportunity to vote in February 1906 to determine the Member of Parliament who would represent the university seat. Macmillan argued that the wording of the General Council's voting statutes used the word persons throughout, and that she and the other female graduates were indeed persons. In March, Macmillan wrote to Elizabeth Clarke Wolstenholme Elmy to ask for aid, as Elmy was the author of the pamphlet The Enfranchisement of Women. Macmillan told Elmy "I formed my beliefs on your pamphlet." Elmy recommended she contact Charlotte Carmichael Stopes for additional useful arguments. Macmillan brought the case before the University Courts in 1907 but lost, and lost a subsequent appeal. Scottish suffragists banded together to raise the £1000 required to present a case to the House of Lords. They hoped to raise awareness in Great Britain of the absurdity and injustice of denying the vote to educated women such as themselves.

In November 1908, Macmillan appeared in London to argue, as a university graduate, for her right to vote for Scottish University seats. During her speech, the buildings of Parliament were made to suspend the temporary arrangements put in place to prevent women from entering—such arrangements had been instituted after the first militant suffrage agitations. Macmillan was the first woman to argue a case before the bar of the House of Lords. She was backed by her contemporary, Frances Simson, one of the first eight female graduates of Edinburgh. Given audience late in the day, Macmillan spoke for three-quarters of an hour. Press reports of the appearance described her as a "modern Portia," Shakespeare's fictional heiress and legal dilettante. In Scotland, Glasgow's The Herald reported that she began nervously but warmed to her subject and "argued law in an admirable speaking voice". Two days later she continued to plead her case, this time in "complete self-possession", wearing a dark red outfit and hat trimmed with ermine furs. Like other suffragists in Britain and the United States, she based her case on the words person and persons in the voting statutes, arguing that such unspecific words were no basis for the exclusion of one entire sex from voting. The court upheld both lower courts' decisions that the word persons did not include women when referring to privileges granted by the state. She lost the case, but The New York Times reported that she responded to the decision against her with the words "We'll live to fight another day". In Wellington, New Zealand, the Evening Post wrote a less strident account, noting that Macmillan was cheerful in defeat. After the court adjourned, she said to a reporter from the London Daily Chronicle, "I don't suppose that there is anything more to be done just now, but we shall live to fight another day." No matter her exact words, her time at the House of Lords attracted worldwide publicity which proved valuable to the women's cause.

A lunch celebrating MacMillan and Simson's presentation to the House of Lords was held in the Edinburgh University Women Students' Union on Saturday 9th January 1909. According to the Scotsman newspaper, it was to acknowledge their "energy, skill and ability" in presenting the appeal. Dr Elsie Inglis presided.

In 1906-1908 Macmillan was the honorary secretary and treasurer of the Women Graduates of the Scottish Universities (Parliamentary Franchise) Committee. She was active in several suffrage organisations: The Scottish University Women's Suffrage Union (SUWSU), the NUWSS (on their executive committee), the Edinburgh branch of the NUWSS (vice-president) Macmillan spoke at many suffrage meetings during this period; for example, in 1909, she was a speaker at an NUWSS meeting along with Dr Elsie Inglis and Alice Low in Edinburgh's Café Oak Hall. A guest speaker was J A Scott from New Zealand, where women already had the right to vote.

In 1909 the SUWSU mounted tours in southwest Scotland (led mainly by Frances Parker), and northern Scotland, led by Chrystal Macmillan. Macmillan's first visited Dingwall and Ullapool. As she remarked, Ullapool was more challenging, as it was not on the rail network. She then headed to Caithness. The John o’Groats Journal was not overly sympathetic: ‘The women of Wick and Pultneytown … have never aspired to air their grievances other than on the stairhead. The suffragettes have come to educate them.’ Nevertheless, the Rifle Hall was filled, and it seated 800, with all standing room taken too.

Chrystal Macmillan then headed further north to Orkney and Shetland. On her return to the Highlands, she spoke at Helmsdale, Golspie, Dornoch, Cromarty and Alness. Her visit led to the first formation of a society in Dornoch. At the end of the trip, Chrystal Macmillan reported: ‘This brings the Northern campaign to an end. Our society has held twenty meetings in the North of Scotland. Sixteen were indoor meetings, at which the audiences varied in number from 100 to 1,000 (the average was about 300), and in 17 places the meeting was the first that had been held on the subject. Nothing has impressed me more than the intelligent sympathy we have met in almost every place, not only in the meetings, but also from those to whom we talked.' Her visit was still remarked upon four years later in Caithness.

In 1911, Macmillan attended the sixth congress of the International Woman Suffrage Alliance (IWSA) in Stockholm. There, she embarked upon a long-term project, in cooperation with Marie Stritt, president of the German Union for Woman Suffrage, and Maria Vérone, president of the French League for Women's Rights, to document women's voting conditions around the world. In May 1913, after two years of correspondence with widely separated women's rights activists to gather global information, the women completed Woman Suffrage in Practice, 1913, a book to which Carrie Chapman Catt added a foreword. Published in conjunction with the NUWSS and the National American Woman Suffrage Association, the book described current women's voting practices in 35 countries and empires, with the authors dividing the work by country. Macmillan was responsible for writing about the UK, the US, New Zealand, Australia, India, China, South Africa and five smaller countries. Macmillan noticed that in few countries and empires were women excluded specifically by statute—they were instead kept from voting by custom alone. She wrote from both personal experience and outside observation of women's activists: "as soon as they become alive to this fact, they have tested the legality of their exclusion in the law courts." In 1913, Macmillan attended the seventh IWSA congress in Budapest, and began to serve the IWSA as vice president, a position she would hold for ten years. In 1914, she authored a 30-page booklet entitled Facts versus fancies on woman suffrage published by the NUWSS.

== Peace activism ==
When World War I began, Macmillan looked for peace activism on the part of NUWSS. Instead, she found a majority of British women were in favour of helping the men win the war. Her pacifism was not at all passive—soon after hostilities broke out, she travelled to Flushing, Netherlands on a mission of mercy. By late October 1914 she was providing food for refugees from the fall of Antwerp. Macmillan signed the Open Christmas Letter, a peace-seeking exchange between women of warring nations, in late 1914.

Elsewhere in the world, pacifist women were forced to adjust to the realities of war. After "the guns of August", Rosika Schwimmer, a native of Austria-Hungary working in England but prevented by war from returning home, outlined her idea for an international conference of neutrals to mediate between warring nations. In September 1914, Stritt wrote to Catt in America with "deep personal regret" for the "terrible war". The pacifist women of Germany were forced by war to withdraw their invitation to host the annual IWSA congress which was to have been held nine months later in Berlin. In December 1914, Canadian Julia Grace Wales, a professor at the University of Wisconsin–Madison, published her views about working toward a mediated peace in a pamphlet entitled "Continuous Mediation Without Armistice", popularly known as the Wisconsin Plan. Taking these messages as her inspiration, Catt proposed that, rather than holding a woman suffrage convention in Berlin, an international peace congress of women should meet in The Hague for four days beginning 28 April 1915.

When this announcement reached the UK, the NUWSS was divided on the one hand by patriots such as Millicent Fawcett who were devoted to war work and on the other by the signers of the Christmas letter who wished to send peace delegates. However, the majority of the NUWSS were nationalistic more than they were peace-minded. They rejected a resolution favored by internationalists Helen Bright Clark and Margaret Bondfield which would have supported a delegation of women at The Hague. Because of this, women such as Margaret Ashton, Helena Swanwick and Maude Royden resigned from the NUWSS and made plans to attend at The Hague, some 180 women in total. Macmillan was the only internationalist executive of NUWSS who did not resign; she was away performing relief work. Volunteering near The Hague, Macmillan prepared to join the ex-NUWSS members after the group crossed the English Channel.

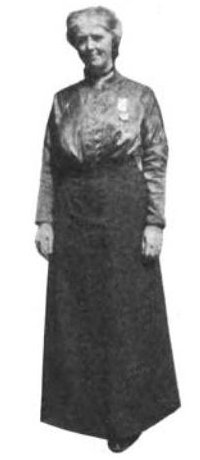
Macmillan was photographed at The Hague in 1915 for an article published in The Survey.

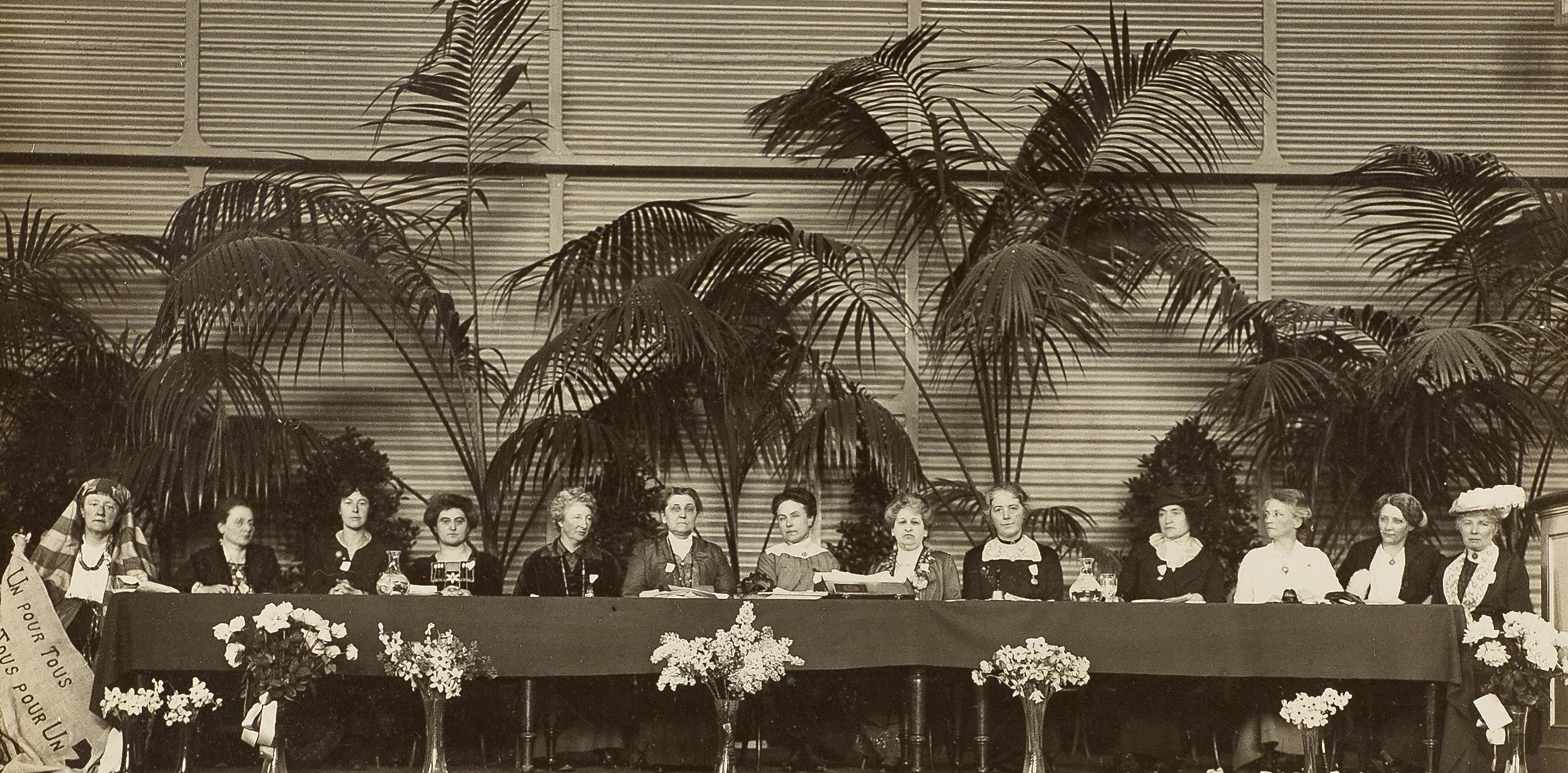
International Congress of Women in 1915. left to right:1. Lucy Thoumaian – Armenia, 2. Leopoldine Kulka, 3. Laura Hughes – Canada, 4. Rosika Schwimmer – Hungary, 5. Anita Augspurg – Germany, 6. Jane Addams – U.S., 7. Eugenie Hamer, 8. Aletta Jacobs – Netherlands, 9. Chrystal Macmillan – UK, 10. Rosa Genoni – Italy, 11. Anna Kleman – Sweden, 12. Thora Daugaard – Denmark, 13. Louisa Keilhau – Norway

At The Hague 28 April to 1 May 1915, a large congress of 1,150 women from North America and Europe gathered to discuss peace proposals. The event was called the International Congress of Women, or the Women's Peace Congress. The 180-strong contingent of British women was greatly reduced by Winston Churchill's purposeful cancellation of British ferry service across the Channel, stranding most of the British activists. Already in Antwerp, Macmillan easily attended the women's conference to speak for the UK—she was one of only three British women present. Macmillan was selected as a member of the international committee who were to travel to neutral nations and champion the proposal of the Congress. The Wisconsin Plan was unanimously adopted as the optimum method for returning peace to the world, and Macmillan, Schwimmer and the committee travelled to the neutral US to present President Woodrow Wilson with it. Many of the women's peace proposals were used by Wilson in his Fourteen Points, and the women's efforts helped encourage the later founding of the League of Nations.

After the war, Macmillan went to Zürich in May 1919 as a delegate to the International Congress of Women. The Congress strongly condemned the harsh surrender terms that were being planned for Germany in the Treaty of Versailles to be signed the next month. Macmillan carried this written condemnation to the ongoing Paris Peace Conference, but no changes were made to the treaty.

== Lawyer ==
By early 1918, British women who had attained the age of 30 were given the right to vote and hold office. Following the passing of the Sex Disqualification (Removal) Act 1919, which enabled women to become members of the legal profession, Macmillan applied to Middle Temple as a pupil barrister. She was called to the bar on 28 January 1924 and in 1926 joined the Western Circuit, becoming only the second woman to be elected to its Bar Mess. Between then and 1929 she acted as counsel for defence in the six cases in which she appeared on the Circuit, and she took 65 cases in the North London Session courts between 1927 and 1936. From 1929, she appeared at the Central Criminal Court in five cases for the prosecution, and one for defence [court books]. There are no records available for her civil cases. As she was studying for the bar, she co-founded the Open Door Council for the repeal of legal restraints on women. Macmillan worked to lift restrictions and so give women of all stations an equal opportunity in the workplace. NUWSS was re-organised in 1918 as the National Union of Societies for Equal Citizenship, but Macmillan disagreed with the group's stance on protective legislation for women workers. In 1929, she co-founded a global group, the Open Door International for the Economic Emancipation of the Woman Worker—she served as president of this group until her death.

== Politician ==
At the 1935 general election, Macmillan unsuccessfully stood for election as the Liberal candidate in Edinburgh North. She came third, with less than 6% of the votes.

General Election 1935
| Party | Candidate | Votes | % | ±% |
|---|---|---|---|---|
| Unionist | Alexander Galloway Erskine Erskine-Hill | 20,776 | 66.53 | −8.50 |
| Labour | G.W. Crawford | 8,654 | 27.71 | +2.74 |
| Liberal | Chrystal Macmillan | 1,798 | 5.76 | N/A |
| Majority | | 12,122 | 38.82 | −11.25 |
| Turnout | | 31,228 | 66.75 | −7.63 |
| Registered electors | | 46,786 | | |
| Unionist hold | | Swing | -5.62 | |

In the same period, she worked to stem the traffic in females used as sexual slaves. To that end, she worked with Alison Roberta Noble Neilans' Association for Moral and Social Hygiene. Feminist writer Cicely Hamilton wrote of Macmillan that "she was the right kind of lawyer, one who held that Law should be synonymous with Justice ... Her chief aim in life—one might call it her passion—was to give every woman of every class and nation the essential protection of justice. She was, herself, a great and very just human being ... She could not budge an inch on matters of principle but she never lost her temper and never bore a grudge in defeat."

== Women's nationality ==
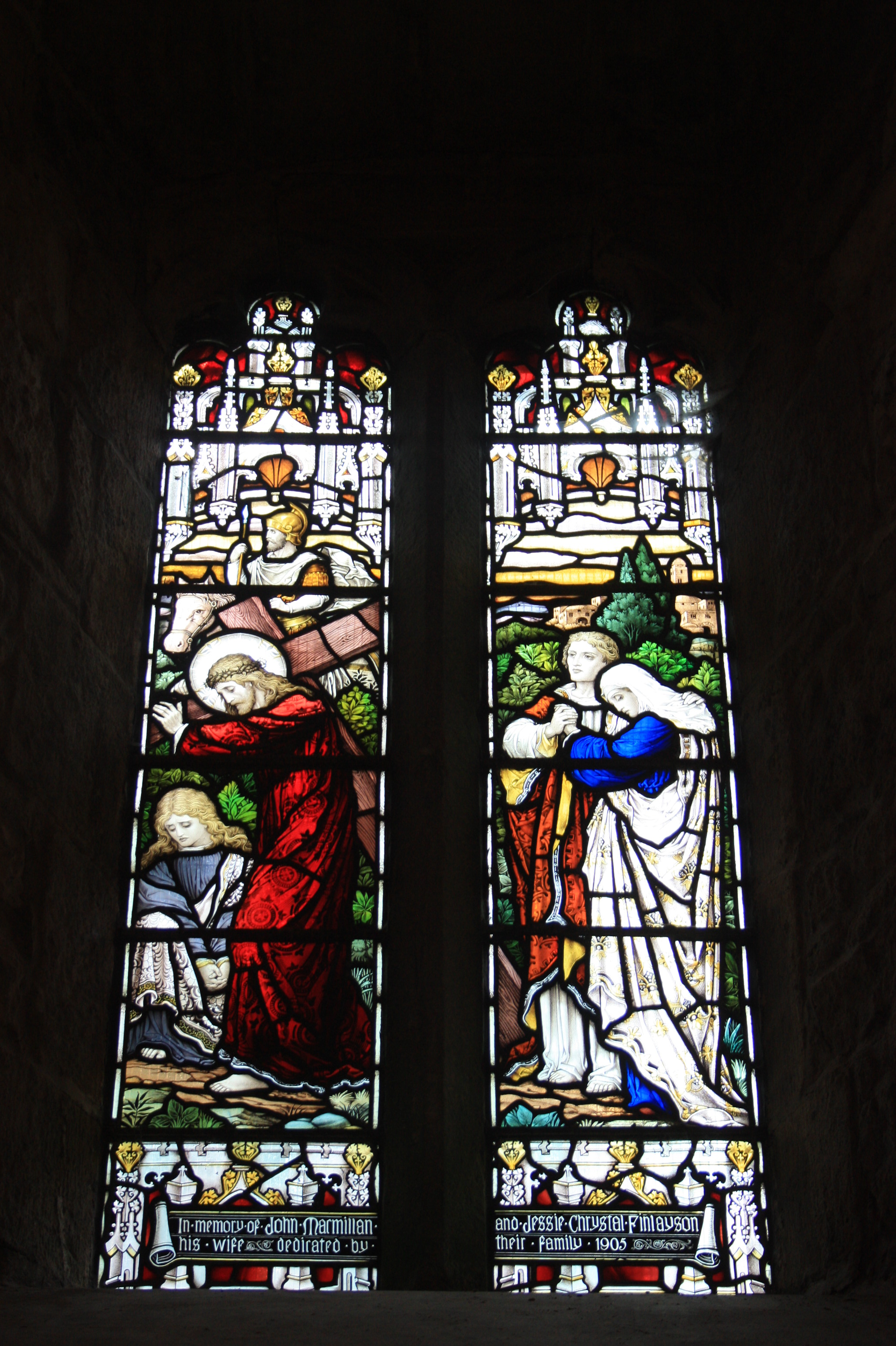
Memorial window dedicated to the parents of Jessie Chrystal Macmillan, Corstorphine Parish Church

In 1917, Macmillan spoke out against the practice of assigning a woman's national citizenship depending on whom she married. From 1905, this had been the vocal position of Ishbel Hamilton-Gordon, Marchioness of Aberdeen and Temair, known as Lady Aberdeen, but Macmillan saw the issue in a new light during the war. Women who were married to foreigners were, upon declaration of war, faced suddenly with status as enemy nationals within the land of their birth. From the same legal basis, a number of British women were enjoying full citizenship in enemy territories. Macmillan was in favour of women having the right to independent nationality with the same right to retain or change as men. To that end, she wrote a piece entitled "The Nationality of Married Women" that was published twice in Jus Suffragii, once in July 1917 and again with updated statistics in June 1918. However, no new laws were passed about it, and a woman's citizenship remained tied to that of her husband.

The subject came up again in 1930, during the Conference on Codification of International Law, held in The Hague. A strong contingent of women from America joined international women's groups to change the existing nationality laws, but the women were unable to agree on wording. Intense lobbying by women, and a massive parade demonstration, failed to influence the conferees, and the international law continued to hold that a woman's nationality followed her husband's. In response, Macmillan organised an International Committee for Action on the Nationality of Married Women early the next year. Six of the most influential international women's groups sought a broad base of support from working women. Macmillan's stated goal was to delay ratification of the Hague Convention, and to make certain that a woman's nationality would not change without her consent, and that the nationality of a couple's children would not be more influenced by the father's nationality. The new committee was successful in lobbying the League of Nations to address the problem, but when the League constituted a study group, that group was split between two intractable factions. On one side were those who wanted a married couple to have exactly one nationality, based on that of the husband, and on the other side were those like Macmillan who favoured independent citizenship between spouses, with the possibility of wives having different citizenship than their husbands, and children to be allowed dual citizenship. In 1932, the women's group, at an impasse, were pushed aside as ineffectual by the League of Nations, who decided in favour of ratifying the Hague Convention. The women's group disbanded, and the Hague convention was ratified in 1937.

== Death ==
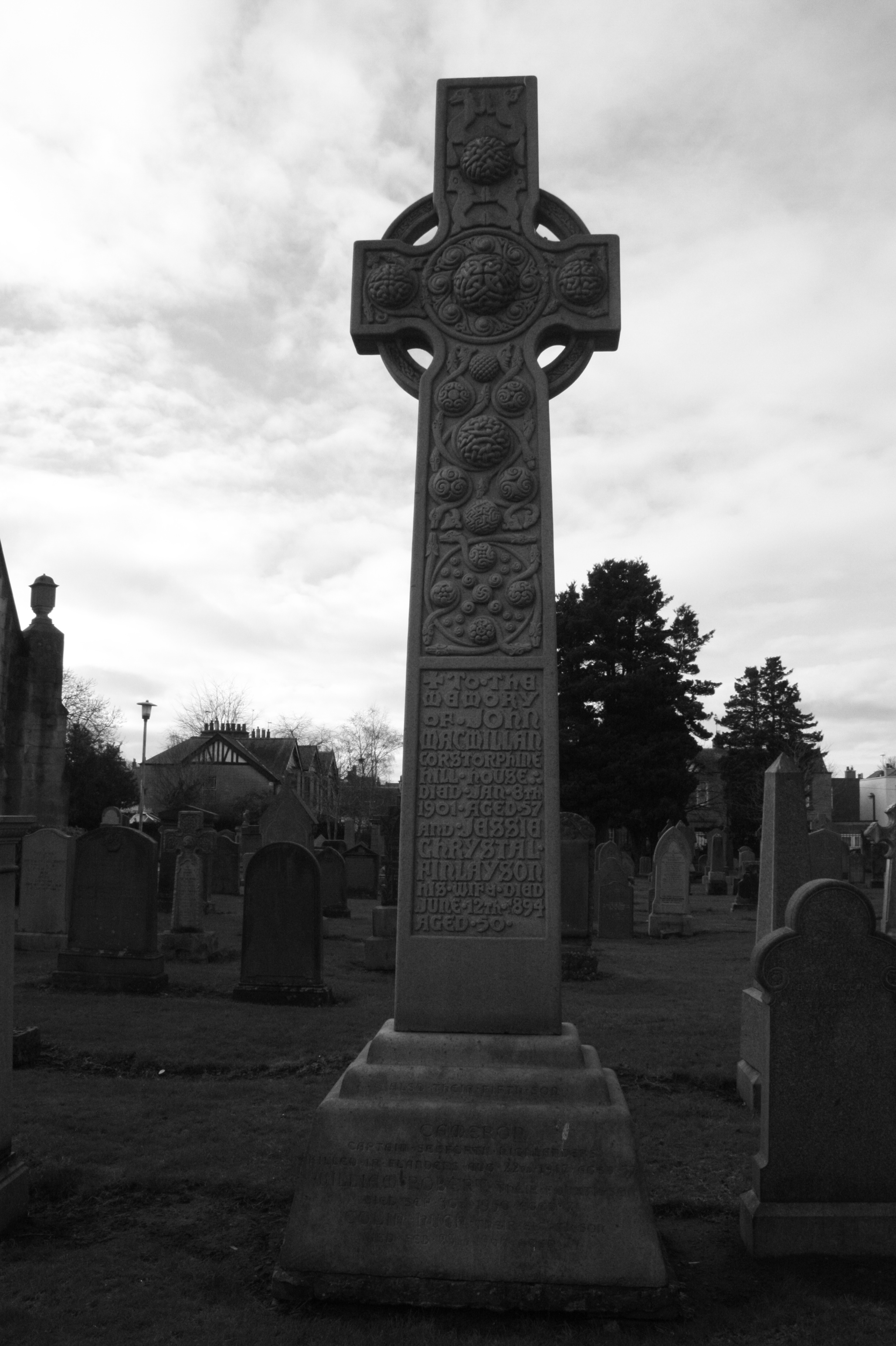
The grave of Chrystal MacMillan, Corstorphine churchyard, Edinburgh

In 1937, Macmillan's health was failing and in June of that year she had a leg amputated. On 21 September she died of heart disease, at home in bed at 8 Chalmers Crescent, Edinburgh. On 23 September her body was cremated. Her remains were buried with her parents in Corstorphine churchyard in the west of the city. The grave is marked by a substantial granite cross just north of the church.

In her will, she specified bequests to the Open Door International for the Economic Emancipation of the Woman Worker, and to the Association for Moral and Social Hygiene.

A memorial stained glass window was added in Old Corstorphine Church soon after her death. It is on the south side of the church towards the south-east corner.

== Legacy ==
The Chrystal Macmillan Prize is a £100 award given "at the discretion of the Scholarships and Prizes Committee" of the Honourable Society of the Middle Temple in London, a professional group of attorneys. The prize was founded as an annual grant to benefit female law students scoring the highest in the bar's final examination, and to support societies with which Macmillan was associated.

Her alma mater, the University of Edinburgh, has honoured Macmillan in several ways. The university's Chrystal Macmillan Building at the north-west corner of George Square is named in her honour, one of only two University buildings named after women. Since 2008, it houses the majority of the School of Social and Political Science.

A Millennial Plaque honouring Macmillan is placed at the King's Buildings, a science campus at the university. The plaque notes that she was a "suffragist, founder of Women's International League for Peace and Freedom", as well as the being the "first woman science graduate of the University" in acknowledgment of her achievement in 1896.

In 2021, the university's School of Social and Political Science instituted the Chrystal Macmillan PhD Studentship, to be awarded to PhD students studying fields relevant to Chrystal Macmillan, including social justice, gender and equality, human rights, and conflict resolution.

In 1957, the United Nations established independent nationality for each married person, a ruling Macmillan had worked toward without success in her lifetime.

Her name and picture (and those of 58 other women's suffrage supporters) are on the plinth of the statue of Millicent Fawcett in Parliament Square, London, unveiled in 2018.

== See also ==
- List of peace activists
