= Open Christmas Letter =

Public Message

The Open Christmas Letter

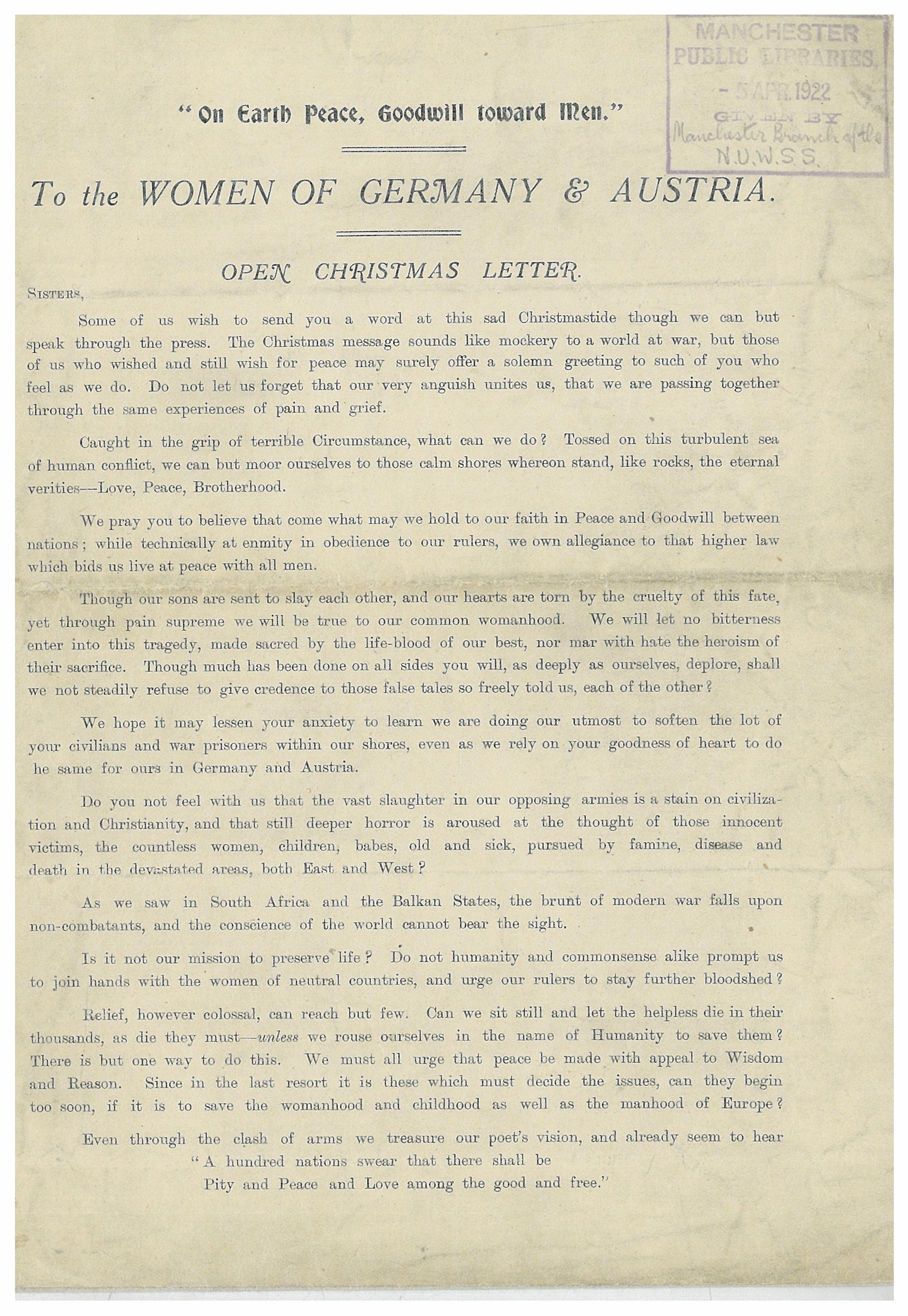
First page

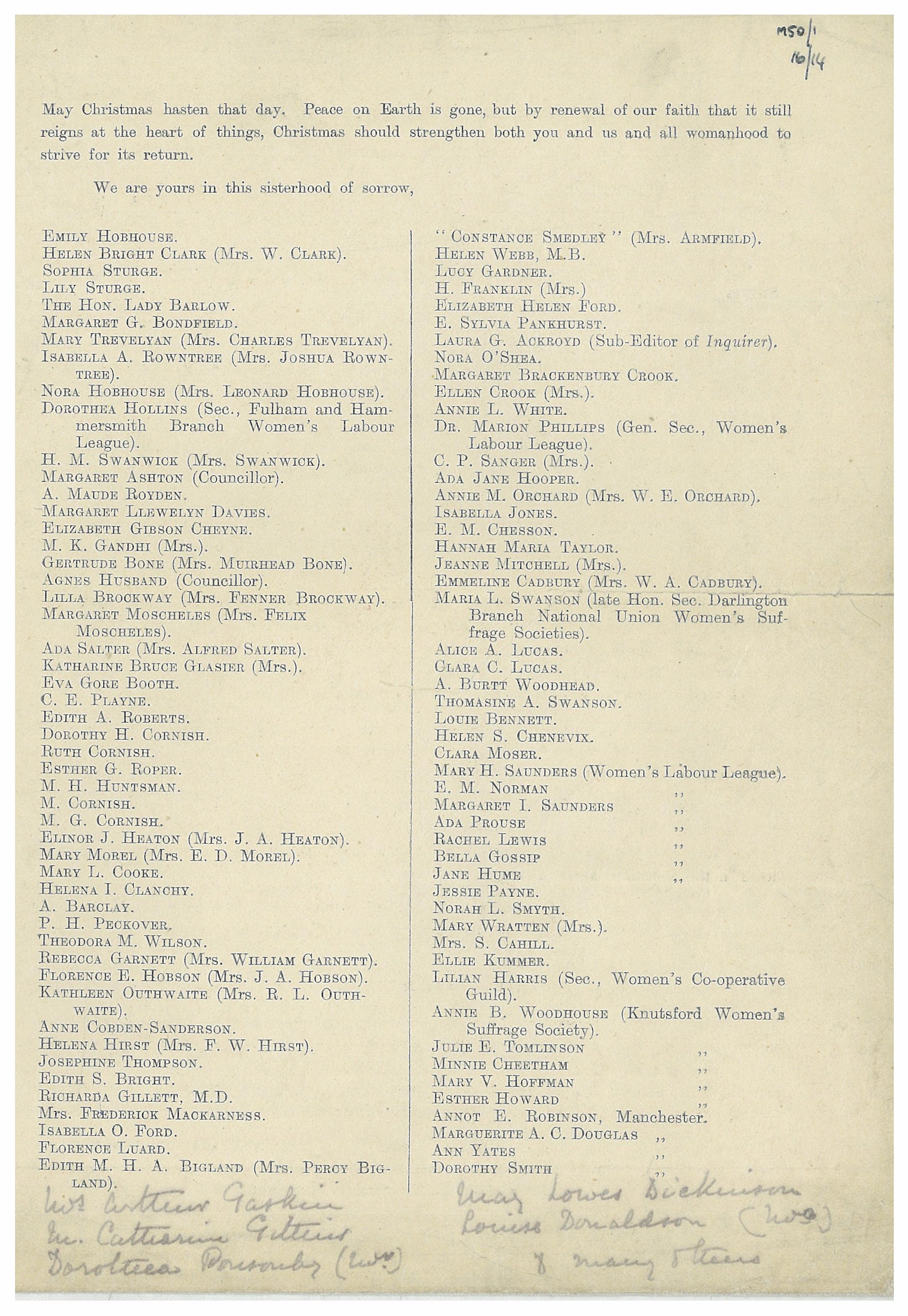
Second page

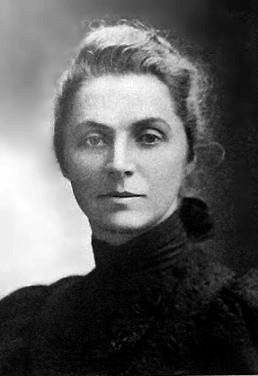
Emily Hobhouse authored the Open Christmas Letter and circulated it for signatures.

The Open Christmas Letter was a public message for peace addressed "To the Women of Germany and Austria", signed by a group of 101 British suffragists at the end of 1914 as the first Christmas of the First World War approached. The Open Christmas Letter was written in acknowledgment of the mounting horror of modern war and as a direct response to letters written to American feminist Carrie Chapman Catt, the president of the International Woman Suffrage Alliance (IWSA), by a small group of German women's rights activists. Published in January 1915 in Jus Suffragii, the journal of the IWSA, the Open Christmas Letter was answered two months later by a group of 155 prominent German and Austrian women who were pacifists. The exchange of letters between women of nations at war helped promote the aims of peace, and helped prevent the fracturing of the unity which lay in the common goal they shared, suffrage for women.

== Reaction to war ==
The decision by some suffragists to speak out against the war split the women's suffrage movement in the United Kingdom. Most British women were in favour of a quick solution to the conflict and were inclined to work toward that end in any way such as by helping fill positions abandoned by men off at war. Others were nationalistic and sought to make certain that British women were seen as patriotic, as doing their part, so that the men in power would think more highly of them and subsequently pass woman suffrage legislation. A minority of women advocated peace vociferously and worked with international peace organisations or with refugee aid societies. Nearly all suffragists agreed not to disrupt the nation at war in their promotion of women's suffrage. Toward the end of the war partial suffrage was granted, for property-holding women aged 30 and over.

== Background ==
From 1906 until mid-1914, the Labour Party in the United Kingdom was the party seen as most supportive of women's suffrage—the right of women to vote. Suffragettes and other women's rights activists organised to elect Labour candidates and to push for legislation that expanded the rights of women. In August 1914 when the world became embroiled in war, the British women activists were sharply divided into two camps: the majority who wished to work with their country's war effort, and a minority who opposed the conflict. Millicent Fawcett of the National Union of Women's Suffrage Societies (NUWSS) wished to have the NUWSS members work for the war so that the men in politics would view the women with greater respect and would thus be more amenable to granting them the right to vote. However, the NUWSS membership included those who were against war. When Fawcett turned the NUWSS to war work, eleven pacifist members resigned, later to join the Women's International League for Peace and Freedom (WILPF).

Like the NUWSS, the more militant Women's Social and Political Union (WSPU) led by Emmeline and Christabel Pankhurst chose to cease their obstructive activism for women's votes and instead advocated the alignment of British women to the cause of war. However, in October 1914, Sylvia Pankhurst travelled to Glasgow and spoke out against the war, becoming one of the first suffragettes to do so. She said that "peace must be made by the people and not by the diplomats". Though pacifist, Sylvia Pankhurst held with her mother and sister to the general agreement that suffragettes would abstain from militant activism for the duration—she arranged for activist women to join with the War Emergency Worker's Committee and fill some of the positions that had been abandoned by men leaving for war.

== German suffragists ==
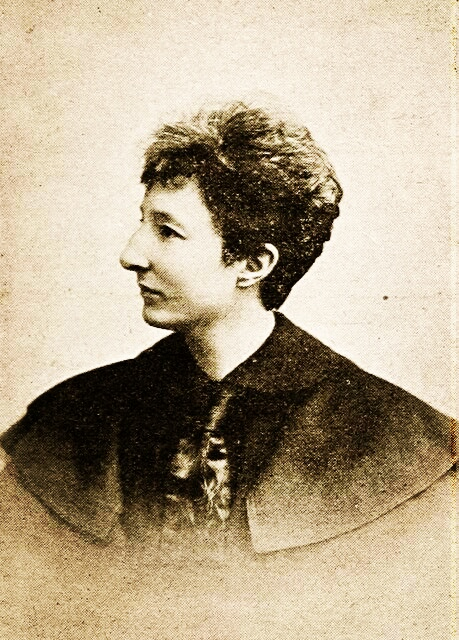
Anita Augspurg, German lawyer and activist, sent a letter to the International Woman Suffrage Alliance in late 1914.

In Jus Suffragii in December 1914, Carrie Chapman Catt published a letter that she had received earlier from Anita Augspurg, Lida Gustava Heymann, and several other German women activists including presidents of woman suffrage societies in Germany. The letter was entitled "To the International Woman Suffrage Alliance, through its president, Mrs. Chapman Catt." It began, "To the women of all nations warm and hearty greetings in these wretched and bloody times." The German women expressed that the "criminally rekindled war" should not separate women from all countries who had previously been united "by the common striving for the highest object—personal and political freedom". They stated that "True humanity knows no national hatred, no national contempt. Women are nearer to true humanity than men."

Catt published another letter from German women's rights activist Clara Zetkin, one that expressed the desire for all women not to let "the thunder of guns and the shouts of the jingoes" make them forget that the rise of civilisation amongst the European countries held much in common. Zetkin wrote that the women of the world should guard their children against the "hollow din" of "cheap racial pride" which filled the streets, and that "the blood of dead and wounded must not become a stream to divide what present need and future hope unite".

== British suffragists ==
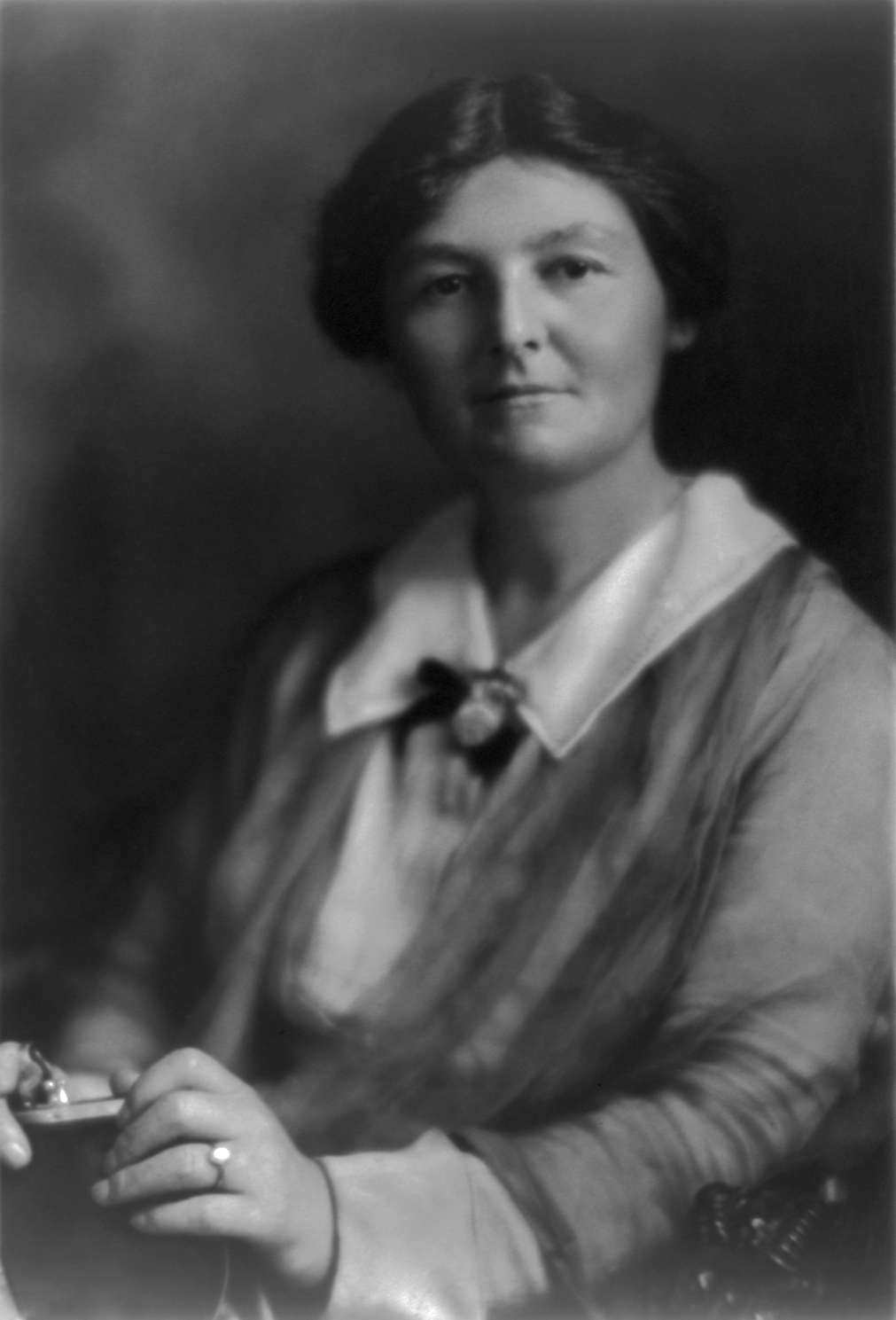
Margaret Bondfield signed the Open Christmas Letter but was unable to travel to The Hague in April 1915.

In response to the letters from Germany, Emily Hobhouse organised the writing and signing of a peace-promoting letter from British women: the Open Christmas Letter. In the 1900s, Hobhouse campaigned against and worked to change the appalling conditions inside the British concentration camps in South Africa built for Boer women and children during the Second Boer War. She saw in the German letters the opportunity for maintaining vital international relations among women who could help mitigate the damage that war would bring. She wrote what she called a "Letter of Christmas Greeting" in November 1914 and circulated it for signatures of women who wished for peace. Sylvia Pankhurst and Helen Bright Clark were among the first to sign Hobhouse's plea for continued sisterhood among the women of the world.

Others among the 101 signers were Margaret Ashton, Margaret Bondfield, Eva Gore-Booth, Esther Roper, Maude Royden, Helena Swanwick, and a wide range of women united by the wish for "undiminished sisterly relations" and a swift end to hostilities. Included among the women were some who were members of the Women's Labour League, and some of the Independent Labour Party. One of the listed women was "Mrs. M. K. Gandhi" but it is unknown whether Kasturba Gandhi, the wife of Mohandas Karamchand Gandhi, asked that her name be included. At least one of the signers was an American: Florence Edgar Hobson was the New York-born wife of English Liberal social theorist and economist John A. Hobson.

=== Message ===
Under the heading "On Earth Peace, Goodwill towards Men", the letter's salutation addressed "Sisters" and began, "Some of us wish to send you a word at this sad Christmastide, though we can but speak through the Press..." The women of the UK were prevented from direct communication with the women of Germany because of the war. Instead, they sent their missive to America which was at that time a neutral nation. The letter continued, "The Christmas message sounds like mockery to a world at war, but those of us who wished and still wish for peace may surely offer a solemn greeting to such of you who feel as we do." The letter mentioned that, as in South Africa during the Second Boer War (1899–1902) and in the Balkan Wars of 1912–1913, "the brunt of modern war falls upon non-combatants, and the conscience of the world cannot bear the sight".

Is it not our mission to preserve life? Do not humanity and common sense alike prompt us to join hands with the women of neutral countries, and urge our rulers to stay further bloodshed? ...
Even through the clash of arms, we treasure our poet's vision, and already seem to hear

"A hundred nations swear that there shall be
Pity and Peace and Love among the good and free."

May Christmas hasten that day...

== Response ==
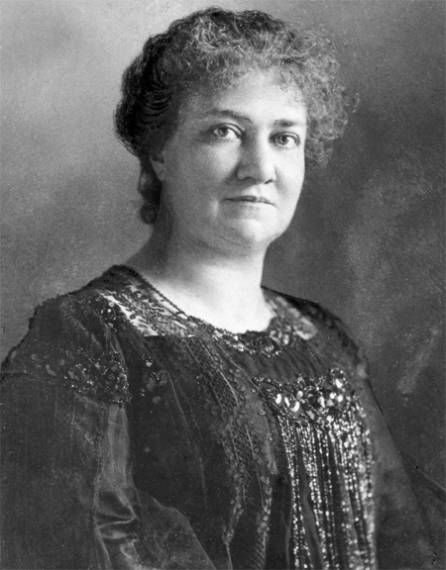
Rosa Mayreder from Austria signed the reply.

In the spring of 1915, the letter was answered in kind by 155 Germanic feminists including Augspurg and Heymann who had sent the earlier letter from Germany. Margarethe Lenore Selenka, Minna Cauer, and Helene Stöcker were among the German signers; Rosa Mayreder, Marianne Fickert, Ernestine Federn, and Ernestine von Fürth were in the group of Austrian signers. The response was entitled "Open Letter in Reply to the Open Christmas Letter from Englishwomen to German and Austrian Women" and was published in Jus Suffragii on 1 March 1915. The letter began:

To our English sisters, sisters of the same race, we express in the name of many German women our warm and heartfelt thanks for their Christmas greetings, which we only heard of lately.
This message was a confirmation of what we foresaw—that women of the belligerent countries, with all faithfulness, devotion, and love to their country, can go beyond it and maintain true solidarity with the women of other belligerent nations, and that really civilised women never lose their humanity...

== Peace initiatives ==
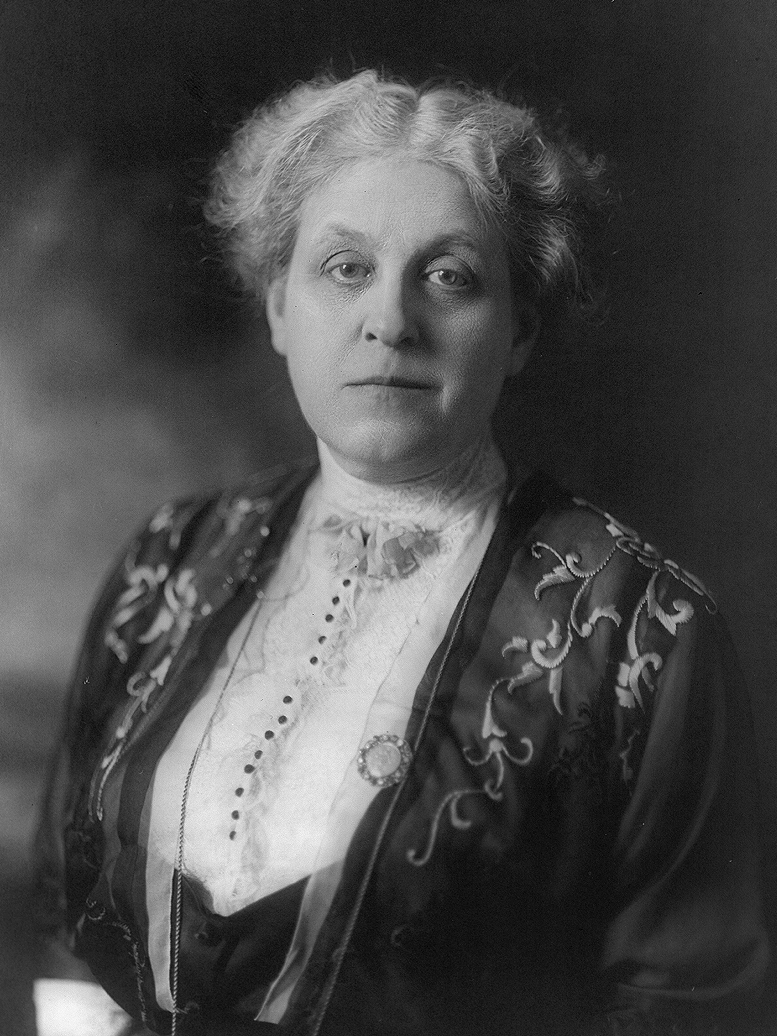
Carrie Chapman Catt aided the interchange of peace wishes between women of warring nations.

Directly after war broke out in August 1914, Rosika Schwimmer, a native of Austria-Hungary working in England but prevented by war from returning home, outlined her idea for an international conference of neutrals to mediate between warring nations. In September 1914, Marie Stritt, president of the German Union for Woman Suffrage, wrote to Carrie Chapman Catt in America with "deep personal regret" for the "terrible war" to say that the women of Germany must withdraw their invitation to the annual IWSA International Alliance meeting in June 1915 which was to convene in Berlin. In December 1914 Julia Grace Wales, a professor at the University of Wisconsin, expanded eloquently on the concept, and published her views in a pamphlet entitled "Continuous Mediation Without Armistice", popularly known as the Wisconsin Plan. Taking these messages as her inspiration, Catt proposed that, instead of holding a woman suffrage convention in Berlin, an international peace congress of women should meet in The Hague for four days beginning 28 April 1915.

When this announcement reached the UK, the NUWSS was divided on the one hand by patriots such as Fawcett and on the other by the signers of the Christmas letter who wished to send peace delegates. However, the majority of the NUWSS were nationalistic more than they were peace-minded—they were primarily concerned with helping the UK men win the war. The NUWSS membership rejected a resolution favoured by Helen Bright Clark and Margaret Bondfield which would have supported a delegation of women at The Hague. Because of this, Margaret Ashton resigned from the NUWSS and was subsequently censured by her local Manchester branch of suffragists. As well, Helena Swanwick and Maude Royden resigned from the NUWSS and made plans to attend at The Hague.

At The Hague, between 28 April and 1 May 1915, a large congress of 1,150 women from North America and Europe gathered to discuss peace proposals. The event was called the International Congress of Women, or the Women's Peace Congress. A planned contingent of 180 British women was greatly reduced to just three persons by the government cancellation of British ferry service across the English Channel, stranding Royden and Swanwick, among others. Having already travelled to Flushing, Netherlands on a mission of mercy in late October 1914 to provide food for refugees from the fall of Antwerp, Chrystal Macmillan was able to attend the women's conference and speak for the UK. Macmillan, a signer of the Open Christmas Letter, had previously resigned from the NUWSS when its refusal to stand against the war had become clear. Macmillan was selected as one of the international committee who would travel to neutral nations and champion the proposal of the Congress. The Wisconsin Plan was unanimously adopted as the optimum method for returning peace to the world, and Macmillan, Schwimmer and the committee travelled to the neutral US to present President Woodrow Wilson with the plan. Many of the women's peace proposals were used by Wilson in his Fourteen Points, and the women's efforts helped encourage the later founding of the League of Nations.

== Women's suffrage ==
During the war, with British suffragists abstaining from taking militant action, British statesmen such as Prime Minister H. H. Asquith began to have a change of heart regarding their right to vote. In early 1917 a clause which provided suffrage for property-holding women aged 30 years and older was debated, and in June it was attached to the bill which would later become the Representation of the People Act 1918. Suffragists who were pacifists and suffragists who were nationalistic could both congratulate themselves for winning this incremental victory. Ten years later full voting equality with men was achieved in the UK with the Representation of the People Act 1928.

== See also ==
- Christmas truce
- List of peace activists
- List of suffragists and suffragettes
- List of women's rights activists
- Timeline of women's suffrage
