= School of Social and Political Science, University of Edinburgh =

Coordinates: 55°56′39″N 3°11′26″W

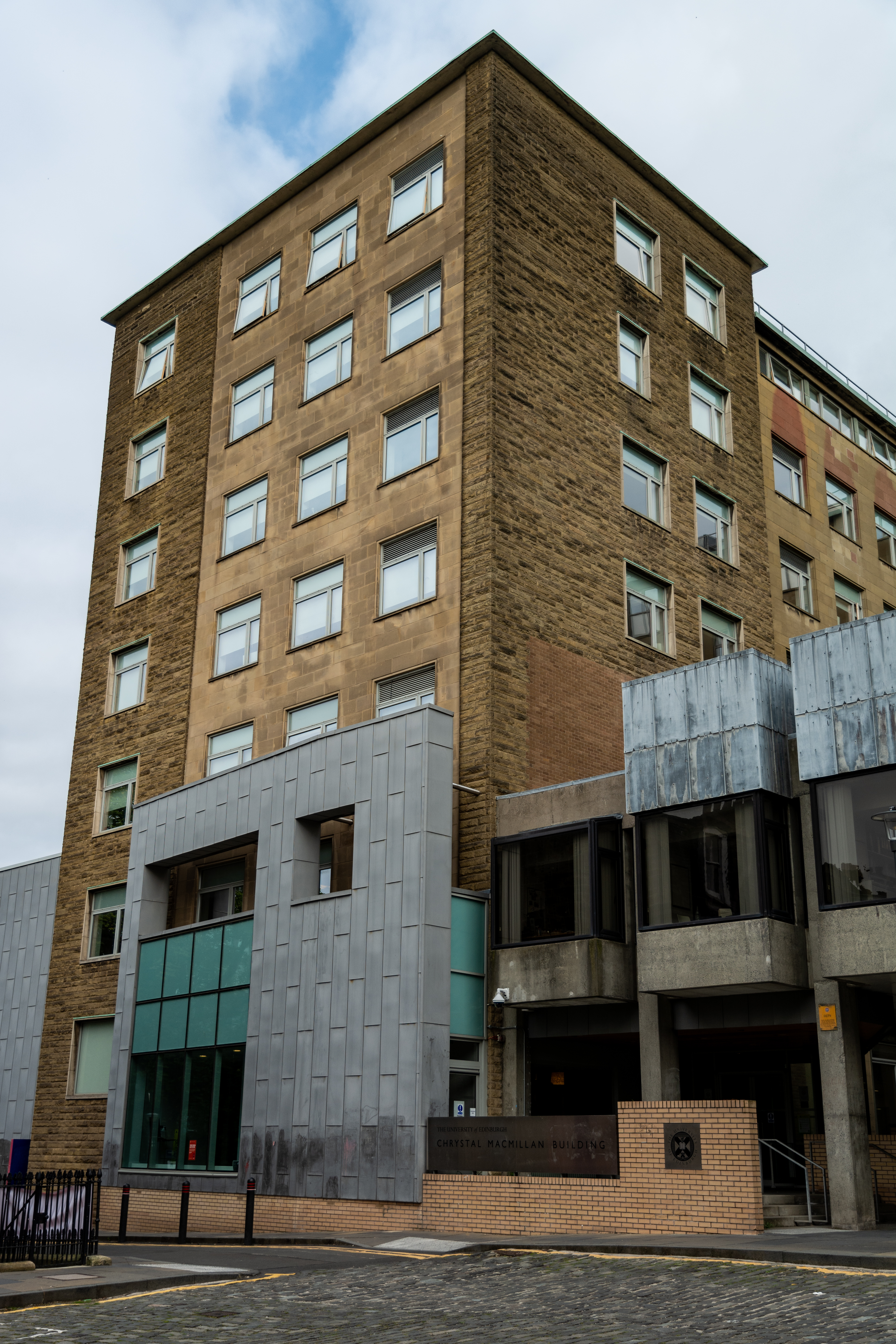
Chrystal Macmillan Building, George Square

The School of Social and Political Science (SSPS) is a department within the College of Arts, Humanities and Social Sciences at the University of Edinburgh in Scotland.

Its constituent subject areas conduct research and teaching in the following disciplines:

- Politics and International relations
- Science, Technology & Innovation Studies
- Social Anthropology
- Social Policy
- Social Work
- Sociology
- Sustainable Development

In addition to these core subjects, the school includes the Europa Institute, Centre for Security Research, Innogen Institute (a collaboration with the Open University) and the Centres of African Studies, Canadian Studies and South Asian Studies.

The School is primarily based in the Chrystal Macmillan Building on George Square, named after the suffragist and first female science graduate of the university. It is one of only two buildings at the University named after a woman.

The School employs over 400 full-time and part-time academics and almost 100 professional services staff. Its current interim Head of School is Professor of Politics Christina Boswell.

The School's subject areas are placed highly in globally comparative academic rankings, such as the 2024 Academic Ranking of World Universities (Political Science: no. 51-75, Sociology: no. 31), 2025 Times Higher Education World University Rankings (Social Sciences: no. 38), and the 2025 QS World University Rankings by Subject (Anthropology: no. 17, Political Science: no. 31, Social Policy: no. 13, Sociology: no. 30).

== Academy of Government ==
The Academy of Government was a public policy and public administration school in SSPS from 2012 to 2018. It offered master's degrees in public policy and, from 2012, public administration. The Academy's Director was Charlie Jeffery, who was also Professor of Politics and Head of the School of Social and Political Science. In 2018 some of its activities were merged into the Edinburgh Futures Institute, and the academy ceased functioning.

== Notable staff and alumni ==
=== Staff ===
- Christina Boswell FBA FRSE FAcSS, political scientist
- Tom Burns, sociologist
- Janet Carsten FBA FRSE, anthropologist
- Tim Hayward, political scientist
- Michael Keating FBA FRSE FAcSS, political scientist
- Fiona Mackay FRSE FAcSS, political scientist (emeritus)
- Jonathan Spencer FBA FRSE, social anthropologist
- Joyce Tait CBE FRSE FSRA, scientist
- Kath Weston, social anthropologist

=== Alumni ===
- Douglas Alexander, Scottish Labour party politician
- Harini Amarasuriya, Prime Minister of Sri Lanka
- David Campbell Bannerman, British Conservative Party politician
- Mona Chalabi, data scientist and recipient of the 2023 Pulitzer Prize for Illustrated Reporting and Commentary
- Christy Clark, former Premier of British Columbia
- Susan Deacon, former Scottish Labour party politician
- Kezia Dugdale, Scottish Labour party politician
- Edwin Feulner, American academic and founder of conservative think tank The Heritage Foundation
- Johnny Hornby, British businessman
- Michael Ingham, retired bishop and theologian in the Anglican Church of Canada
- Prakash Karat, Indian politician
- Allan Little, former BBC reporter
- Callum McCaig, Scottish National Party politician
- Sheila McKechnie, Scottish trade unionist and consumer activist
- Catherine McKinnell, British Labour party politician
- Steve Morrison, television producer and former Rector of the University of Edinburgh
- Edoardo Mapelli Mozzi, businessman and husband of Princess Beatrice
- Ian Murray, Scottish Labour party politician
- Julius Nyerere, first President of Tanzania
- Malcolm Rifkind, British Conservative party politician and Cabinet minister
- Margareta of Romania, head of the Romanian royal family
- John Swinney, First Minister of Scotland
- Princess Tsuguko of Takamado, member of the Imperial House of Japan (did not graduate)
