= Fiona Mackay =

Feminist political scientist

Fiona Mackay FRSE, FAcSS
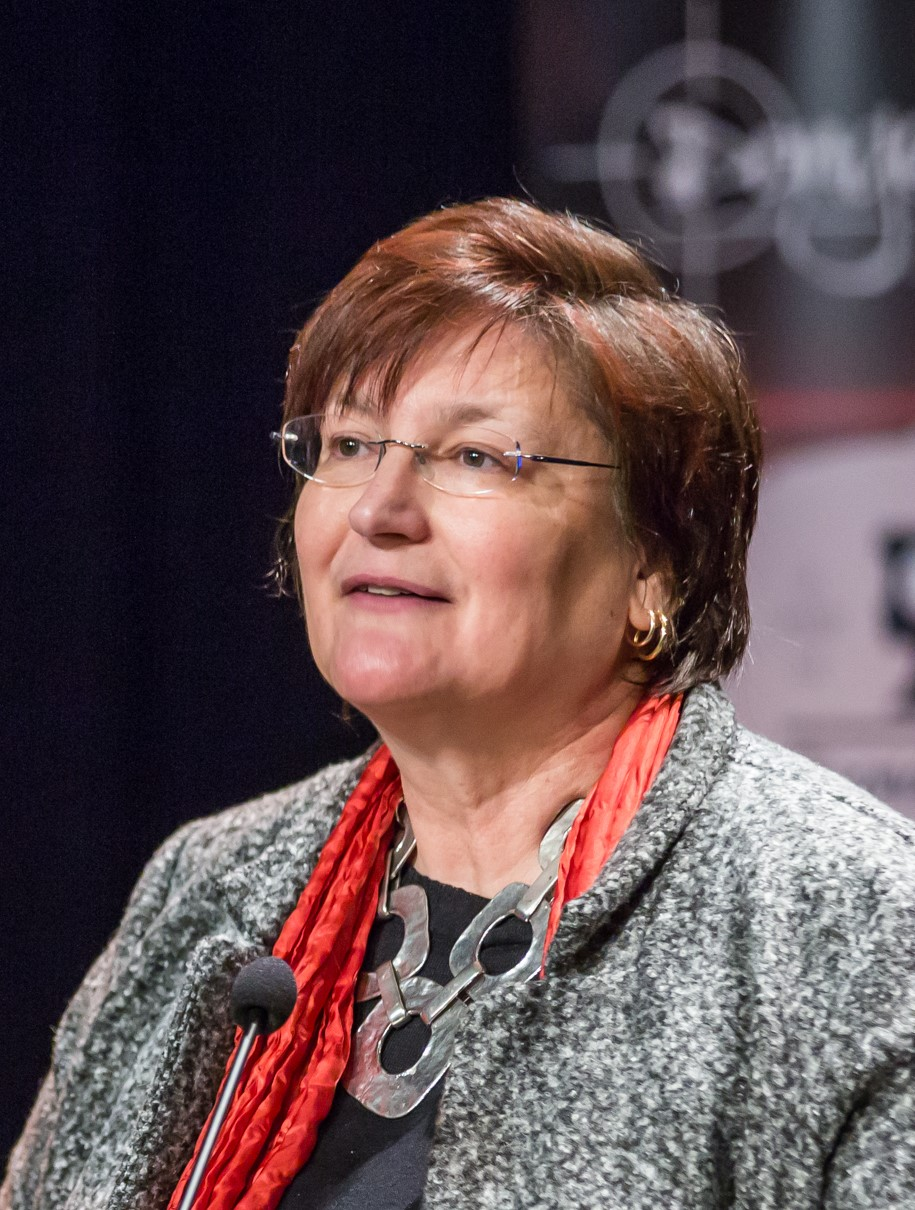
- Fiona Mackay at Institute for Advanced Studies in the Humanities at the University of Edinburgh
- Education: University of Manchester; University of Edinburgh
- Occupation: Professor of Politics
- Employer: University of Edinburgh

Fiona Mackay FRSE FAcSS is a professor of Politics at the University of Edinburgh. Mackay is also director of genderED, the University of Edinburgh's interdisciplinary hub for gender and sexuality studies. She is a Fellow of the Royal Society of Edinburgh and a Fellow of the Academy of Social Sciences.

== Research and career ==
Mackay received her BA (Hons) in Politics and Modern History from the University of Manchester, then her PhD in Politics from the University of Edinburgh. Mackay was the Dean and Head of School of Social and Political Science from 2014 to 2017. She served as director of the Graduate School of Social and Political Science from 2009 to 2012, and Deputy Director from 2003 to 2007. Mackay was a member of the ESRC Virtual Research College from 2003 to 2008, and a member of the ESRC Case Studentship Panel from 2005 to 2007.

Mackay serves on editorial boards of a number of journals: Policy and Politics, European Journal of Politics and Gender, and Politics, Groups and Identies.

She founded and now co-directs Feminism and Institutionalism International Network (FIIN).

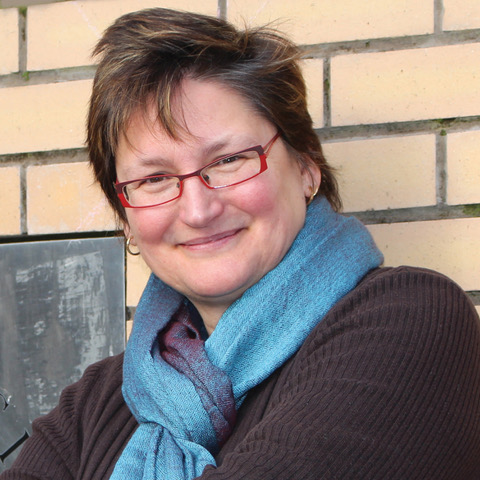
Professor Fiona Mackay at University of Edinburgh

Mackay's research interests include gender and political representation, feminist institutionalism, gender and institutional change, gender and public policy. She has written about the nature of feminist leadership in universities.
