= Joyce Tait =

British professor (born 1938)

Professor Joyce Tait CBE, FRSE, FSRA
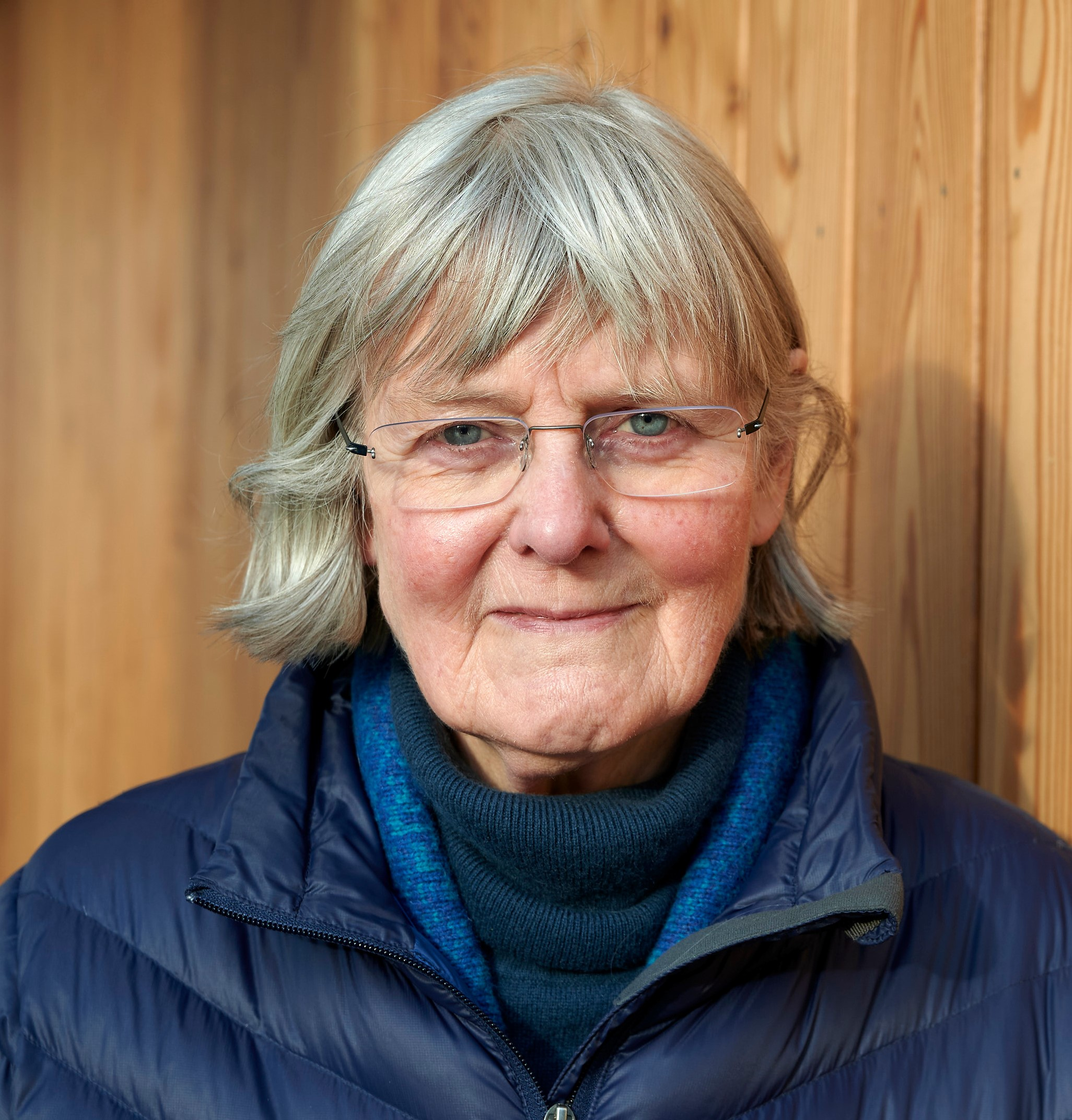
- Born: 1938 (age 87–88)
- Education: University of Glasgow
- Occupations: Scientist and regulator

Elizabeth Joyce Tait CBE, FRSE, FSRA (born February 1938) is a professor at the University of Edinburgh and a member of the UK Council for Science and Technology. She is a member of the UK Government Regulatory Horizons Council, an independent expert committee which provides advice on regulatory reform to support innovation in science and technology. In 2002 she co-founded the Innogen Institute to support scientists in developing innovation in safe ways which are useful to society.

She is an expert in scientific regulation and comments on the safe, evidence-based development of innovation in life science and related areas, including genetically modified foods. She is a member of the Editorial Board of the academic journal Synthetic and Systems Biology.

Tait holds a BSc in Pharmaceutical Chemistry from the University of Glasgow and a PhD in land economy studying regulation of pesticide production and use. She is a Fellow of the Royal Society of Edinburgh and has been awarded an Honorary Doctorate by the Open University. Tait was appointed CBE for services to social science in 2005.

== See also ==
- 2005 Birthday Honours
