= Women at the World's Crossroads =

1922 book by Maude Royden

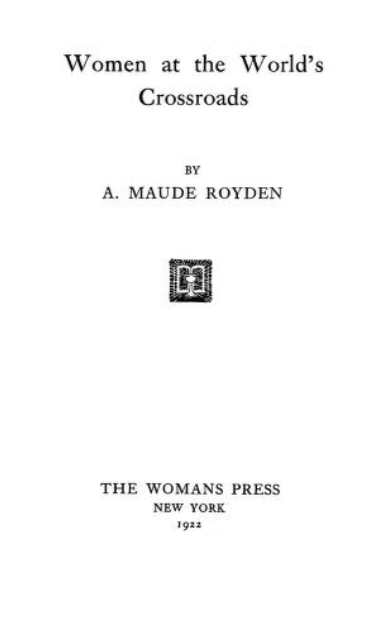
- Title page for Women at the World's Crossroads (1922)
- Author: Maude Royden
- Language: English
- Subject: Women in Christianity
- Genre: Non-fiction
- Publisher: Woman's Press
- Publication date: 1922
- Publication place: United States
- Pages: 139

Women at the World's Crossroads is a 1922 book by English women's rights activist and preacher Maude Royden.

== Summary ==
The book collects Royden's speeches that were made at the prior National Convention of the Young Women's Christian Association. The chapter "Woman's Service to Theology" focuses on women having the right to be ministers based on there being "no authority to be derived from Christ" and Jesus showing himself to men as well as women. The book's final speech is about Royden's belief that love is the only power of creativity.

== Reception ==
The Shamokin News-Dispatch published a 1923 report from YWCA USA that says the book had "widespread demand". The president of YWCA at the time, Mabel Marshall, held a toast to the book. The publisher Woman's Press said in 1923 that the book's demand was "unprecedented" and that a holiday edition on Japanese paper would be published. Mary O. Cowper said in the journal Social Forces that as Royden "writes or speaks she seems not to be visionary or sentimental, but practical, sensible, convincing, and inspiring".
