= Julia Grace Wales =

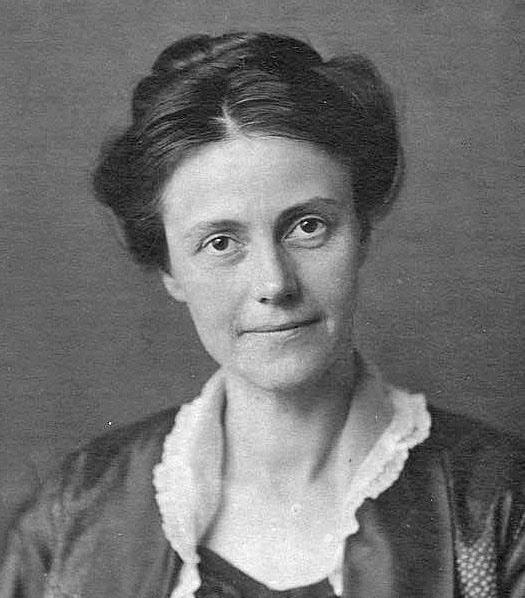
Julia Grace Wales in 1916

Julia Grace Wales (14 July 1881 – 15 July 1957) was a Canadian academic known for authoring the Wisconsin Plan, a proposal to set up a conference of intellectuals from neutral nations who would work to find a solution for the First World War.

== Early life ==
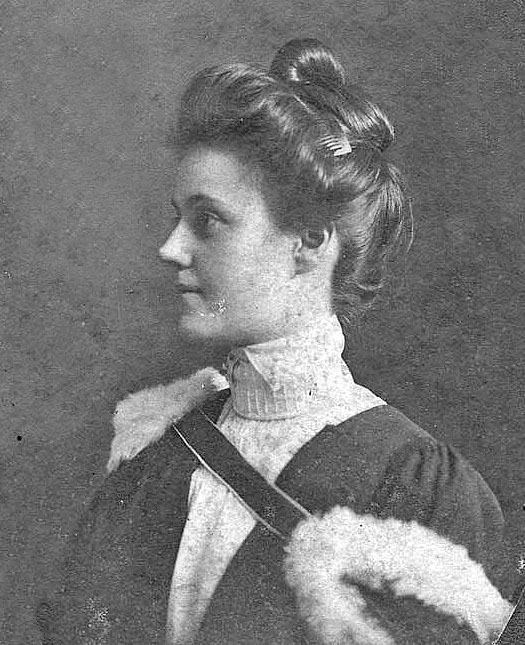
Wales upon graduation, c. 1903

Wales was born on 14 July 1881 in Bury, Eastern Townships, Quebec to Benjamin Nathaniel Wales, a physician - graduate of McGill University in 1874 - and his wife Emma Theodosia (née Osgood), who had married in 1878. Benjamin Nathaniel Wales was the first president of the Historical Society of Argenteuil County, and the grandson of Benjamin Wales, founder of the first paper mill in Canada. The family was Presbyterian.

Julia Grace Wales attended McGill University in Montreal, earning a Bachelor of Arts in 1903. The following year, she received a Master of Arts from Radcliffe College. In 1906, moved from Bury to St. Andrews East, Quebec. Wales was successively student, instructor and professor of English literature at the University of Wisconsin (now University of Wisconsin–Madison). She taught at the University of London from 1919 until 1920, and then at the University of Cambridge until 1921. Specializing in William Shakespeare, she earned a doctorate in 1926.

== Peace activism ==
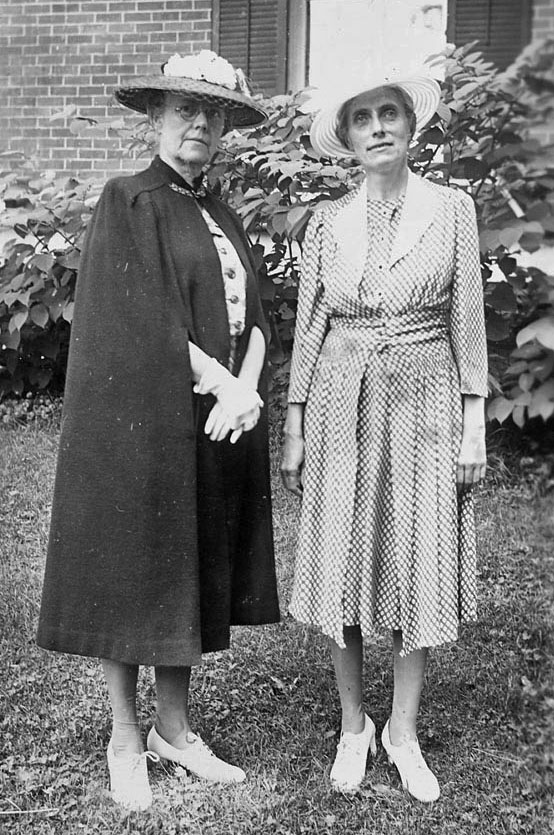
Julia Grace and Evelyn Wales

By December 1914, Wales had become horrified and physically sickened by the First World War reports coming from Europe. A close friend of hers wrote that "the pity and horror of it seized upon her". Convinced that the war was both irrational and un-Christian, Wales published her views and a solution for the end of the war in a pamphlet entitled "Continuous Mediation Without Armistice", popularly known as the Wisconsin Plan. Her plan was to have the United States organize a conference of intellectual mediators from neutral nations, who would receive suggestions from the belligerent nations while at the same time discussing possible solutions to the war.

The plan was endorsed by several anti-war and peace movements, as well as by the Wisconsin Legislature. As a delegate, Wales represented the Wisconsin Peace Society at the International Congress of Women, held at The Hague in April 1915. She thus became a founding member of the Women's International League for Peace and Freedom. As a member of the conference's embassy, Wales took her proposal, adopted as a resolution of the conference, to European governments. Her plan failed when the United States entered the war in April 1917, and she returned to North America to resume her academic career.

== Later life ==
Wales never gave up her interest in the peace movement, and continued publishing pacifist articles. Along with her mother and younger sister, Anna Letitia, she co-authored a collection of poetry titled Argenteuil Lyrics, which was published in 1935. She also wrote articles on religious themes. Her book, Democracy Needs Education, was published in 1942.

Having resided in Madison, Wisconsin from 1940 until her retirement in 1947, Wales returned to St. Andrews East. She died there on 15 July 1957, the day after her 76th birthday. She never married and had no children.

== See also ==
- List of peace activists
