= Feminist institutionalism =

Feminist institutionalism is a new institutionalist approach that looks at how gender norms operate within institutions and how institutional processes construct and maintain gender power dynamics. Feminist institutionalism focuses on how institutions are gendered and how their formal and informal rules play a part in shaping political life. It offers a new way of interpreting the formation of institutions that goes beyond traditional views by accounting for the gendered stigma and gendered outcomes that comes with institutions. As a result, feminist institutionalism is changing the face of various institutions by providing awareness into their very own dynamics of inclusion and exclusion.

Feminist institutionalism touches upon all areas involved in the construction of institutions and has a direct effect on things such as policies, legislations, laws and/or quotas, and many more. Gender plays an important role in this process by impacting both power relations and social interactions, because it is through the understanding of gender that individuals classify and rate masculinity and femininity throughout various institutions. This form of new institutionalism plays an active role from within, seeking to alter the ways in which it operates and how it is institutionally framed by having an influence on its policies and outcomes.

A feminist perspective aims to help with understanding the framework that starts to shape between gendered institutional subjects and the environment, and also aims to provide an insight on how institutions can be re-gendered.

== History ==
New institutionalism began to emerge as a topic of discussion among scholars and literature in the 19th and 20th century, from that feminist institutionalism began to stem. Feminist institutionalism came to be popular because many feminist political scientists wanted to highlight the ways in which there is a gendered lens on political institutions. Feminist institutionalism has been looked at as adding a new dimension of understanding to new institutionalism in terms of power and the dynamics of inclusion and exclusion. Feminist institutionalism wishes to touch upon both the strengths and limitations of institutions. In the past feminist institutionalism has critiqued institutions for their gendered blindness of the existing field, and highlights that gender is embedded in political institutions and that in turn this is shaping social interactions.

Initiatives and organizations have formed to promote and make the public more aware of feminism and institutionalism. In 1987 the Feminist Majority Foundation (FMF) formed in the United States. They are dedicated to research and action to empower women economically, socially and politically, this group aims to advance the legal, social and political equality of women with men. Another organization founded in 1987 is Institute for Women's Policy Research whose aim is to advance women's status by developing new policy ideas, encouraging public debate and promoting sound policy and program development through a gendered lends. More recently in 2006 the Feminism and Institutional International Network (FIIN) emerged with scholars from Scotland, England, Denmark, Sweden and the USA participating in their workshops. This network aims to look at the approaches of gendered institutions and how these approaches address issues of gender, politics, power and change. Since then these scholars have gone on to publish a hand full of research papers on the topic.

== Gender Roles ==
Gender makes up a big part of feminist institutionalism, and is one of the main driving factors that pushes and influences research on institutionalism. Gender underlines choices that are being made and is ever present in the subconscious, guiding final decisions concerning institutions. Many scholars believe that gender is something that has been overlooked, leaving gaps in research and having potential institutional processes missed. Acknowledging gendered institutions means that gender is present in various sectors of social life such as practices, processes, images and ideologies and the distribution of power.

Political institutions are guided and influenced by gender through social norms and bias that are created in the public sphere. Institutions such as law, politics, religion, state and the economy have historically been developed by men and have been interpreted through a male perspective, leaving out the standpoint of women. Although gender relations play out differently depending on the specific context, there is a broad agreement among scholars that masculinized gender is embedded in political institutions that are established by and for men. Gender is built into the fabric of institutions it is not something that has been added on, in this sense political and policy making institutions are structured by gendered assumptions and produce outcomes such as policies, legislation and rulings that are influenced by these gender norms.

Gender can not be overlooked in the broader scope of new institutionalism, a greater understanding of its role needs to be implemented. Recognizing that gender is present in institutions and social interactions provides new insights and power dimensions of political institutions.

== Policies ==
=== Implementation ===
Feminist institutionalist aim to have policies placed on the political agenda that work to empower women and put them at equal standing with men. Government bodies are dominantly made up of men which feminist and women activists argue that certain policies will be overlooked or not implemented at all because women's opinions are missing from this debate. Policies that are implemented that reflect feminist institutionalism, must go through a process of outside women fighting for their cause. Implementation of feminist policies entails energy from movements and activists while also creating allies within the government who become a crucial factor to getting an issue on the policy agenda.

The type of government that is in power at the time of these policy decisions plays a factor in which policies will and will not be implemented. The election of different governments have downgraded feminist institutional status and their position in such a way that their ability to shape policy has become insignificant. Shifting government comes with a change in opinions which can either move these feminist policies forward or push them aside. In Canada and the United Kingdom it is difficult for women to operate within the bureaucracy for fear of being looked at as biased and also women may feel a sense of tension towards them as advocating for women has not been welcomed in these institutions. In contrast the Australian government, especially between 1975 and 1995, feminists pushed for the state and federal government to create women's policy agencies in which they were able to work, through this they were able to make policies to confront issues of child care, budget, pensions and violence against women.

=== Quotas ===
Quotas are one of the most frequently used policies that are put in place to aid feminist institutionalist. Quotas touch multiple domains of institutions to help bring more women into the work sphere and help them attain higher positions within the government. Recently more countries around the world have started to adopt quotas, with more than 100 countries putting quotas in place. Quotas are also supported by the international community, the United Nations (UN), the European Union (EU), the African Union and the Southern African Development Community have all put quotas in place that aim to have 30% women in all political bodies in the past 10 years.

Gender and party quotas are put in place to not only increase the number of women that will be holding office positions but is a way to design the selection process in such a way that they are able to identify not just suitable candidates but suitable female candidates. Quota policies that target the increase in women having a position in office can be traced back to the UN Fourth World Conference of Women where women's issues were discussed on the agenda. These quotas have achieved significant increase in the actual number of women holding office.

== Government Branches ==
Women are underrepresented in government institutions compared to the number of men represented in the same institutions. Women have had lower levels of descriptive representation in both the executive and legislative branches of the government, due to this these systems should be regarded and analyzed as such. Women have been positioned as outsiders to these government institutions leaving them incapable of having access to political power. Men have access to a homosocial capital that is used in order to build networks and gain power within this hierarchy, and in contrast women do not have the same access to this crucial capital.

Quota laws are commonly used in government framework to increase the number of female candidates and female legislators. Quotas can either be implemented and regulated by the government or they can be voluntarily taken on, party quotas are taken on voluntarily by parties that commit to reaching a certain number of women within its candidates. The right kind of quota law placed with the right set of conditions can generate significant increases in the election of female candidates, which allows for greater representation across various institutions. Countries such as Rwanda have stated that women must hold at least 30% of political positions, other countries have also put into effect reserved seats which requires that a minimum number of candidates must be female instead of a percentage, guaranteeing that women will be elected.

Political parties are gendered organizations within government institutions, they are characterized by traditional concepts of gender relations. The role that women play within political parties are affected by that parties character, structure and ideology and how open they are to including women within their framework. Feminist institutionalist see females as crucial actors in initiating change within these institutions. Having more women in these institutions acts as a resource for other women to feel more comfortable and operate better within these positions.

== Critiques of Feminist Institutionalism ==
Feminist Institutionalism is often critiqued for having its limitations and not always benefiting those involved. Feminist institutional work often focuses on gender specific policies and institutions and has neglected to explore other outlets. Although feminist institutionalism is growing, institutional arenas remain dominated by men even with measures such as quotas and legislation being put in place, allowing for critique that these measures may not be effective. In some countries there has been little change recorded or countries have experienced setbacks with the number of women that are elected to national assemblies. Feminist institutionalists are critiqued for not having an influence inside institutions. Once they are elected into certain positions or placed in positions of power, women still have to abide by old rules, limiting the amount of change they can accomplish. It has also been critiqued that shifts within institutions are not permanent, thus any change or policies put in place by feminist institutionalists can be removed and altered.
