= Flora Philip =

Scottish mathematician

- Flora Philip (Mrs. Stewart), in 1943.
- Born: 19 May 1865; Tobermory, Mull, Scotland
- Died: 14 August 1943 (aged 78); Edinburgh, Scotland
- Resting place: Dean Cemetery, Edinburgh
- Other name: Flora Stewart
- Known for: One of the first women to graduate from the University of Edinburgh (1893); First female member of the Edinburgh Mathematical Society (1886)
- Spouse: George Stewart (m. 1893; died 1938)
- Scientific career
- Fields: Mathematics and Greek polymath
- Workplaces: St George's School, Edinburgh

Flora Philip (19 May 1865 – 14 August 1943) was a Scottish mathematician, one of the first women to receive a degree from the University of Edinburgh and the first female member of the Edinburgh Mathematical Society.

== Early life ==
Flora Philip was born on 19 May 1865 in Tobermory, Mull to William Phillip, a civil engineer, and Isabella McDougall.

== Education ==
Philip attended at Tain Academy and then moved to Edinburgh in 1883 to continue her education. At the time, the law prevented women from studying at Scottish universities so she enrolled with the Edinburgh Association for the University Education of Women. In 1885 she was awarded the University of Edinburgh Certificate in Arts by University Principal Sir William Muir, for her studies in English literature, ethics, mathematics and physiology.

In 1889 the Universities (Scotland) Act was passed allowing women to be admitted to Scottish universities for the first time. Philip matriculated at the University of Edinburgh and received her degree for her previous studies. On 13 April 1893 she and seven other women graduated from the University, becoming the first women to do so. A report on the graduation ceremony noted "a large attendance of the general public, many of whom were doubtless draw thither to witness the spectacle, seen for the first time in the history of this university, of ladies taking their places (one lady with distinction) among the graduates."

Philip trained to teach at St George's Training College for Women Teachers, and taught at the St George's High School for Girls in Edinburgh until her marriage in 1893.

== Edinburgh Mathematical Society ==
In December 1886 Philips became the first female member of the Edinburgh Mathematical Society despite not having a formal university degree. She withdrew her membership upon marriage in 1893, still the only woman member of the society.

== Anniversary ==
In 1943, the University of Edinburgh marked the fiftieth anniversary of that first group of women graduates, and three of eight attended the ceremony as honoured guests on the platform: Flora Philip, Maude Elizabeth Newbigin, Amelia Hutchison Stirling. Philip died later that year.

== Personal life ==
Philip married lawyer George Stewart in 1893. They had four children. She died in 1943 at a nursing home, aged 78 years, and is buried in Dean Cemetery.
