= Christina Boswell =

British academic

- Born: 1972 (age 53–54); London, United Kingdom
- Citizenship: United Kingdom
- Education: Balliol College, Oxford (BA); College of Europe (MSc); London School of Economics (PhD)
- Occupation: Political scholar

Christina Anne Boswell FRSE FAcSS FBA (b. 1972) is a political scholar. She is a professor of Politics and has served as Vice Principal for Research and Enterprise at the University of Edinburgh.

== Early life and education ==
Boswell was born in London on 14th September 1972, and attended the Sacred Heart High School in Hammersmith. She completed undergraduate studies in philosophy, Politics and Economics at Balliol College, Oxford and a MSc in Public Administration at the College of Europe.

After graduating she worked for 3 years in the European Commission and the United Nations High Commission for Refugees in Geneva and Burundi.

In 1997 she returned to the UK to study for a PhD in International Relations at the London School of Economics. The PhD was later published as a monograph, The Ethics of Refugee Policy.

== Academic career ==
After her PhD, Boswell worked in Hamburg as a postdoctoral research fellow between 2000 - 2006. She initially held a Marie Curie Postdoctoral Fellowship, and then an EU Excellence Grant.

Boswell joined the University of Edinburgh in 2006 as a lecturer in Politics, and was promoted to Senior Lecturer in 2007 and Professor in 2011. She established the Centre for Science, Knowledge and Policy (SKAPE) in 2021, with Steven Yearley.

At the University of Edinburgh Boswell held a series of research leadership roles, including as Director of Research for the School of Social and Political Science, Dean of Research for Arts, Humanities and Social Sciences, and as Pro-Vice Chancellor (Vice Principal) for Research and Innovation.

In 2020 Her 2018 monograph Manufacturing Political Trust: Targets and Performance Measurement in Public Policy was awarded the Mackenzie Book Prize from the Political Studies Association. Her 2012 publication The Political Uses of Expert Knowledge: Immigration Policy and Social Research was awarded the American Political Science Association Prize for the category of 'Best Book on Ideas, Knowledge and Policy'.

Boswell was elected a Fellow of the Royal Society of Edinburgh in 2017. In 2019 she was elected as a Fellow of the Academy of Social Sciences and as a Fellow of the British Academy. Since 2021 she has held the role of Vice President for Public Policy of the British Academy.

Boswell has had a range of advisory roles for international organisations, including United Nations, European Commission, European Parliament, the Organisation for Economic Co-operation and Development, and the UK, Scottish and Germany governments. Between 2018 and 2021 Boswell chaired the Scottish Government's Expert Advisory Group on Migration and Population. She also serves as member of the Home Office Scientific Advisory Council and as an expert advisor to the Department for Science, Innovation and Technology.

== Personal life ==
Boswell lives in Edinburgh with her partner and two children (b. 2009 and 2011).

== Select publications ==
- Boswell, C. 2018. Manufacturing Political Trust: Targets and Performance Measurement in Public Policy. Cambridge University Press.
- Boswell, C. The Political Uses of Expert Knowledge: Immigration Policy and Social Research Cambridge University Press.
- Boswell, C. and Geddes, A. 2011. Migration and Mobility in the European Union. Palgrave
- Boswell, C. 2005. The Ethics of Refugee Policy. Routledge.
- Boswell, C. 2003. European Migration Policies in Flux. Routledge.
