= Maude Royden =

English preacher, suffragist and campaigner (1876–1956)

Maude Royden CH
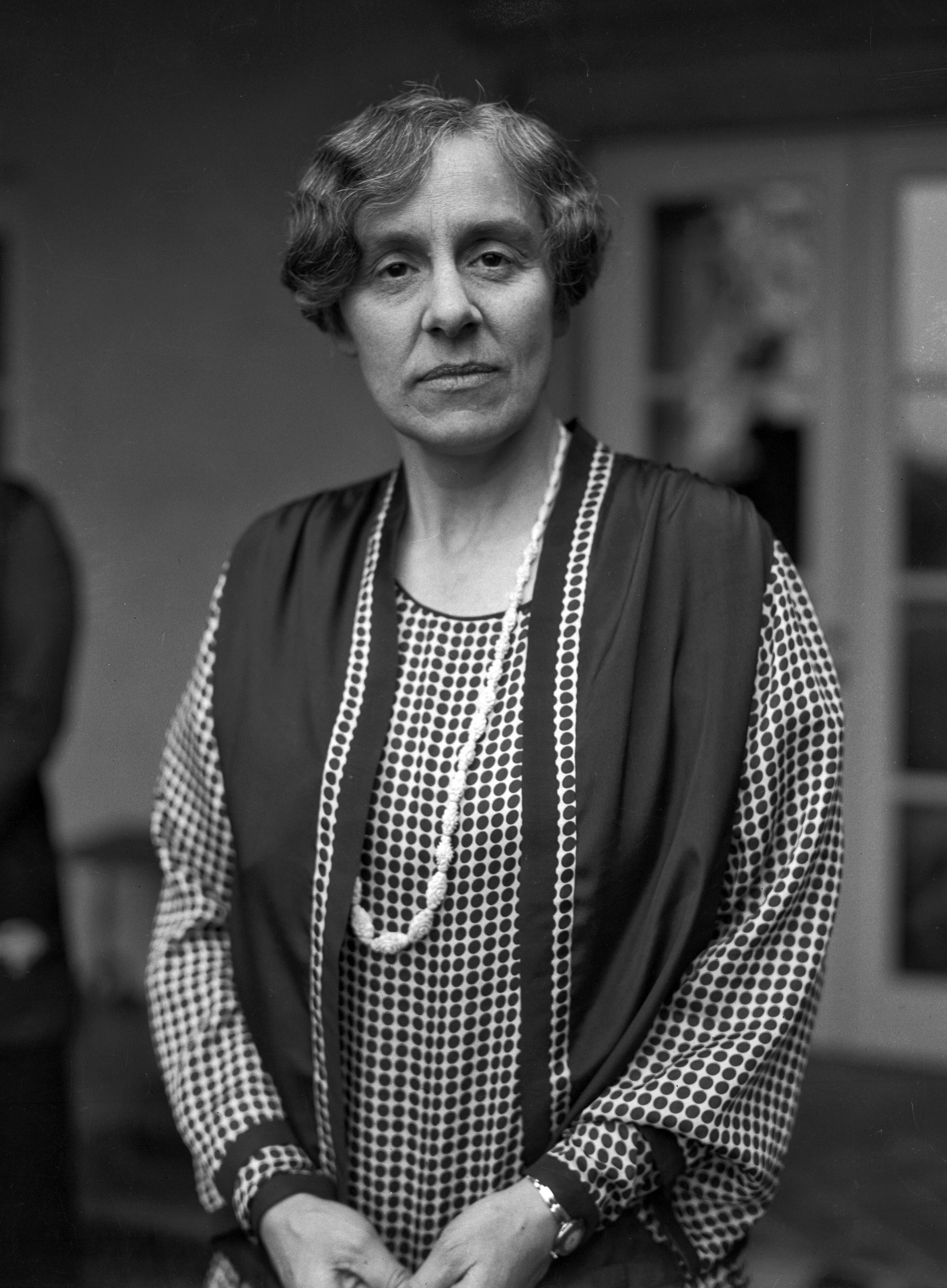
- Royden in 1928
- Born: Agnes Maude Royden; 23 November 1876; Liverpool, England
- Died: 30 July 1956 (aged 79); London, England
- Other name: Maude Royden-Shaw
- Education: Cheltenham Ladies' College
- Alma mater: Lady Margaret Hall, Oxford
- Occupations: Writer; suffragist
- Employer: The Common Cause
- Organization(s): National Union of Women's Suffrage Societies; Church League for Women's Suffrage; Fellowship of Reconciliation; Women's International League for Peace and Freedom; Peace Pledge Union
- Spouse: Hudson Shaw (m. 1944)
- Parents: Sir Thomas Royden, 1st Baronet (father); Alice Elizabeth Dowdall (mother)

Agnes Maude Royden CH (23 November 1876 – 30 July 1956), later known as Maude Royden-Shaw, was an English preacher, suffragist, pacifist and campaigner for the ordination of women.

== Early life and education ==
Royden was born in Mossley Hill, Liverpool, the youngest daughter of shipowner Sir Thomas Bland Royden, 1st Baronet and Alice Elizabeth Dowdall. She grew up in the family home of Frankby Hall, Wirral with her parents and seven siblings. She was educated at Cheltenham Ladies' College and Lady Margaret Hall, Oxford where she gained a degree in History. While at Oxford she started a lifelong friendship with fellow suffragist Kathleen Courtney who had the same alma mater.

== Career ==
After university, Royden worked for three years at the Victoria Women's Settlement in Liverpool and then in the country parish of South Luffenham, Rutland, as parish assistant to the Rector, George William Hudson Shaw.

She lectured on English literature for the university extension movement and in 1909 was elected to the executive committee of the National Union of Women's Suffrage Societies (NUWSS). From 1912 to 1914 she edited The Common Cause, the newspaper of the NUWSS. She was also active in the Church League for Women's Suffrage. In 1913 she was invited, with the backing of Lavinia Talbot to talk to the all-male Church Congress about white slavery.

Royden broke with the NUWSS over its support for the war effort and was among the 101 signatories of the Open Christmas Letter in 1914. She became the secretary of the Fellowship of Reconciliation with other Christian pacifists. Although unable to travel to the women's peace congress in the Hague in 1915, where the Women's International League for Peace and Freedom (WILPF) was established, she became the vice-president of the league.

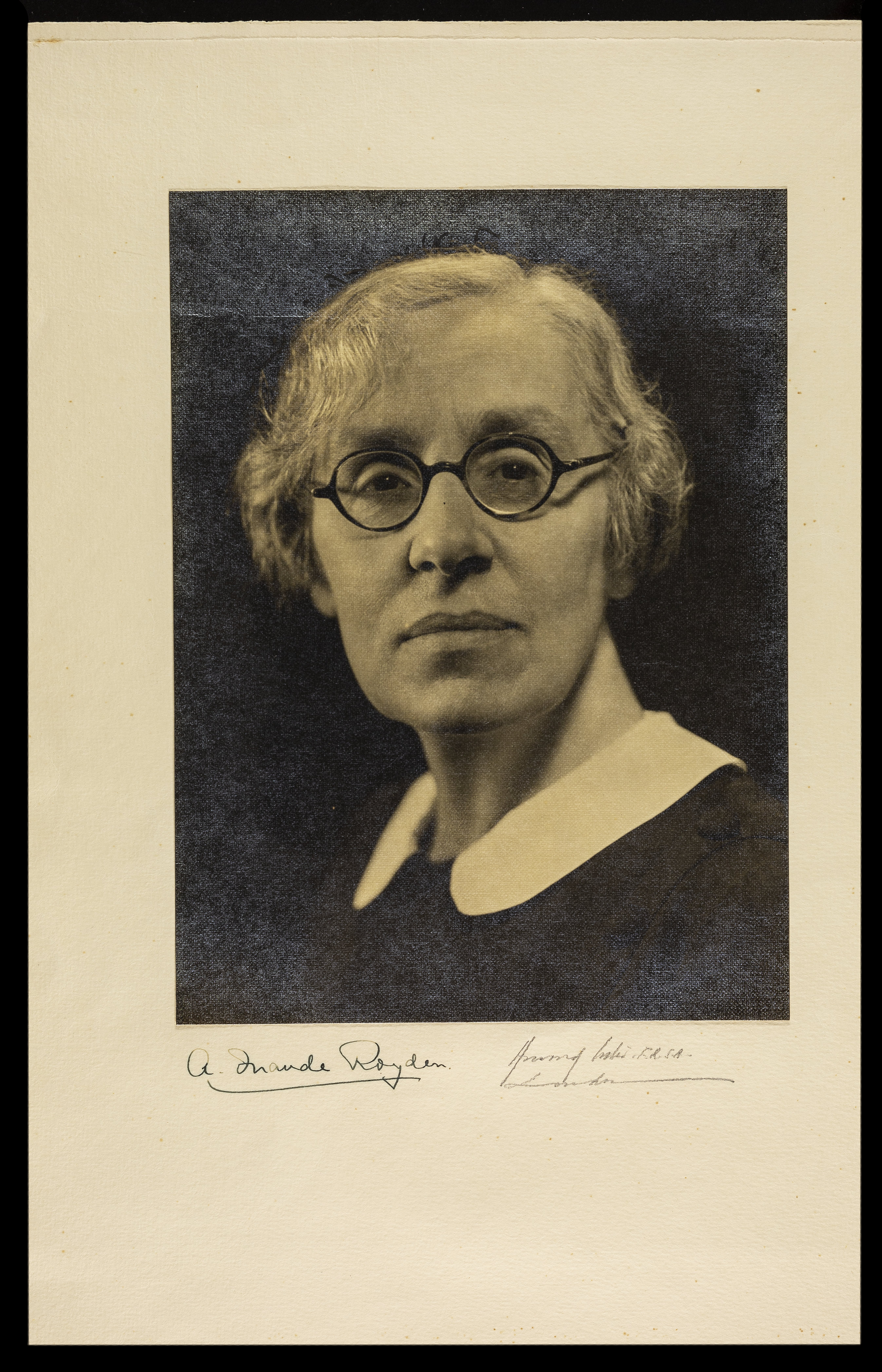
Photographic portrait by Howard Coster

Royden became well known as a speaker on social and religious subjects. In a 16 July 1917 speech at Queen's Hall, London, she used the oft-quoted phrase 'the Conservative Party at prayer' of the Church of England; "The Church should go forward along the path of progress and be no longer satisfied only to represent the Conservative Party at prayer." In 1917 she became assistant preacher at the Congregationalist City Temple, London, the first woman to occupy this office.

After the First World War, Royden's interest shifted to the role of women in the Church. While attending the Eighth Conference of the International Woman Suffrage Alliance at Geneva in 1920, she preached in French and English at St Pierre Cathedral on 6 June. Royden made several worldwide preaching tours from the 1920s to the 1940s. She toured Australia in 1928, preaching in Anglican churches and cathedrals as well as Congregationalist churches.

In 1929 she began the official campaign for the ordination of women when she founded the Society for the Ministry of Women. Royden "eminent in the religious life of the nation" was appointed to the Order of the Companions of Honour in the 1930 New Year Honours. Her older brother Thomas Royden had been made a Member in 1919 (for his work relating to shipping in the First World War) and they are the only siblings to be Members of the Order of the Companions of Honour.

In 1931 Glasgow University conferred the honorary degree of Doctor of Divinity on Royden, the first woman to become a Doctor of Divinity in Britain. In 1935 she was awarded an honorary degree of Doctor of Laws by the University of Liverpool. She received an honorary degree from Mills College, California in 1937.

Royden joined the Peace Pledge Union but later renounced pacifism, believing Nazism to be a greater evil than war.

== Personal life ==
On 2 October 1944, Royden married the recently widowed priest Hudson Shaw, whom she had loved for more than forty years; he was then aged 85 and died on 30 November. She wrote in her 1947 autobiography A Threefold Cord of their love for each other from first meeting in 1901.

At the end of the Second World War, it was discovered that Royden, along with her brother Sir Thomas Royden, were listed in "The Black Book" or Sonderfahndungsliste G.B., a list of Britons who were to be arrested in the event of a Nazi invasion of Britain.

On 30 July 1956 Royden died at her home in Hampstead, London, aged 79.

== Legacy ==
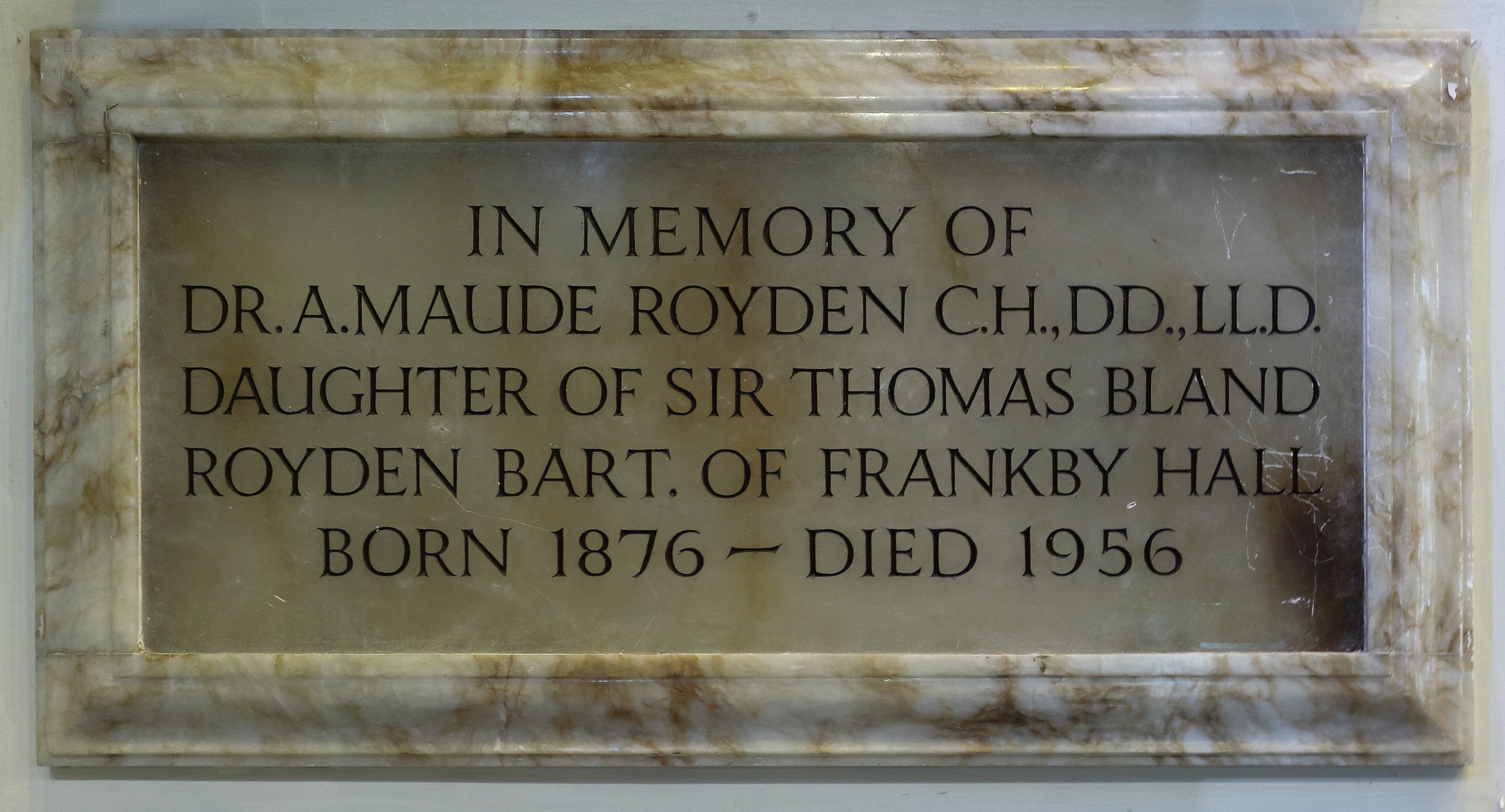
Maude Royden's memorial at the Church of St John the Divine, Frankby

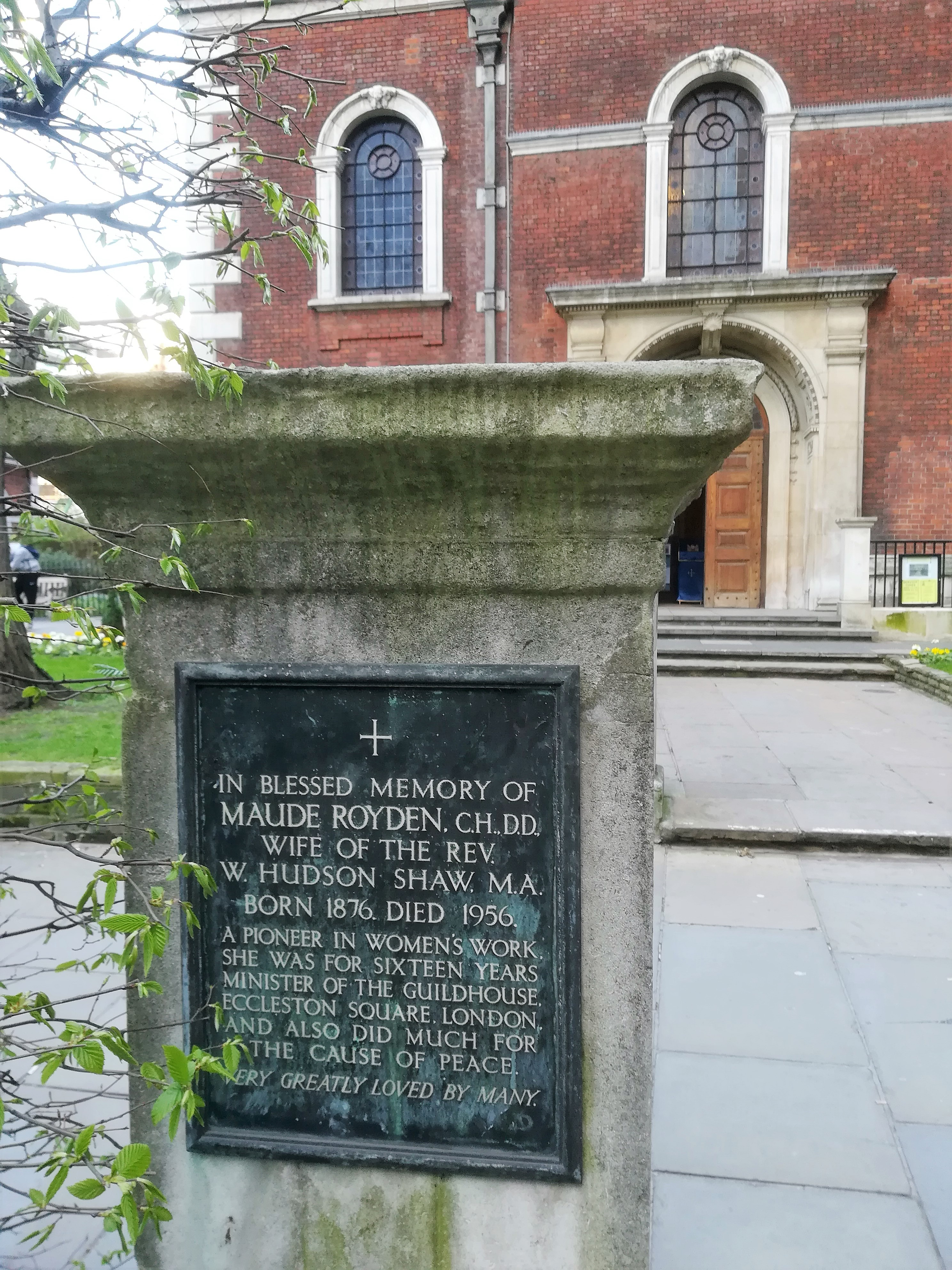
Plaque at St Botolph-without-Bishopsgate, London

Royden's name and picture (and those of 58 other women's suffrage supporters) are on the plinth of the statue of Millicent Fawcett in Parliament Square, London, unveiled in 2018.

A blue plaque was unveiled at Royden's childhood home of Frankby Hall, Wirral on 28 June 2019 by Conservation Areas Wirral.

Papers of Agnes Maude Royden are held in The Women's Library at the London School of Economics and Political Science, ref 7AMR.

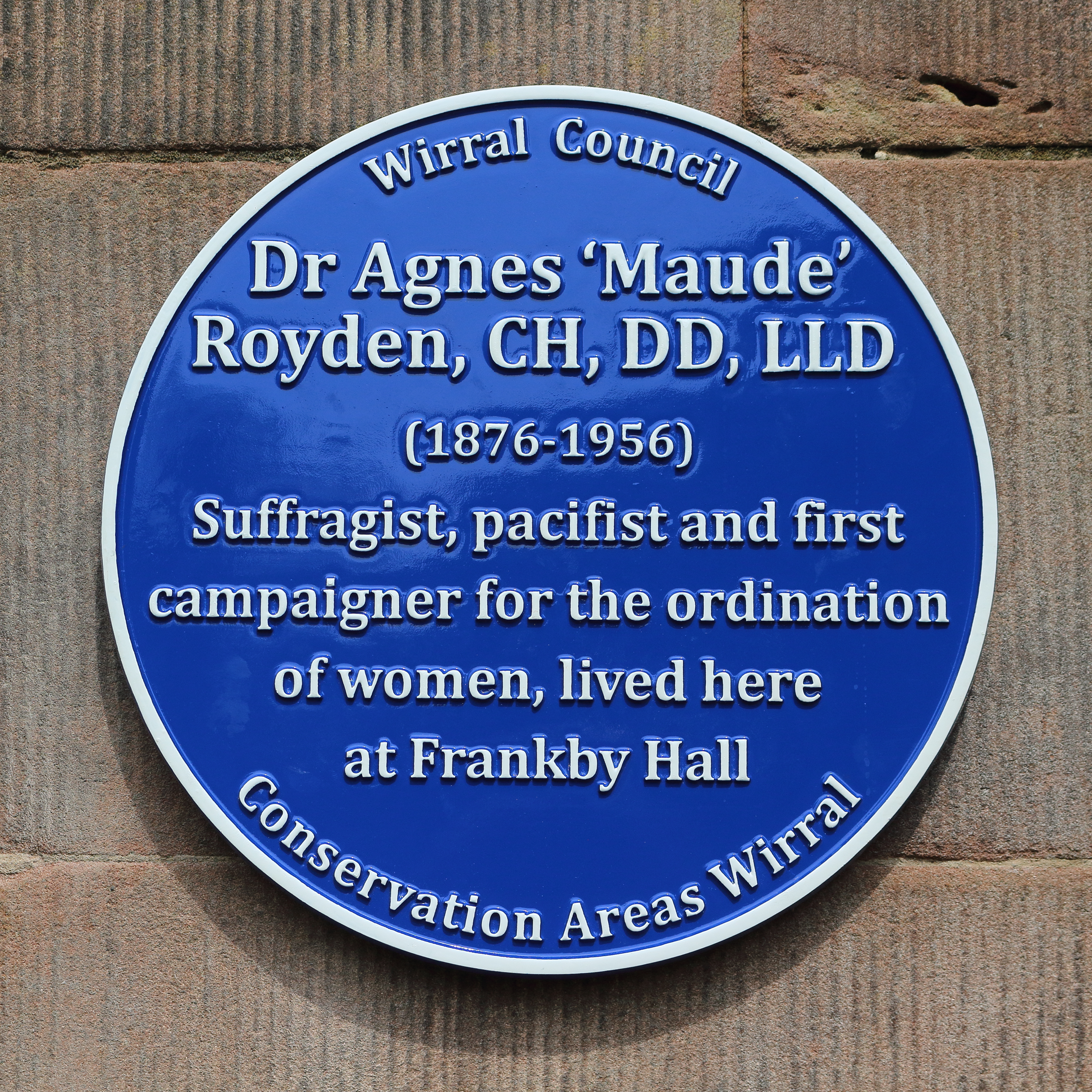
Blue plaque unveiled in 2019 at Royden's family home, Frankby Hall

== Books by Royden ==
- Downward paths (1916)
- Women and the sovereign state (1917)
- Sex and common-sense (1922)
- Women at the World's Crossroads (1922)
- Prayer as a force (1923)
- Beauty in Religion (1923)
- Christ triumphant (1924)
- Church and woman (1924)
- Life's little pitfalls (1925)
- Here--and hereafter (1933)
- Problem of Palestine (1939)
- I Believe in God (1927)
- Women's Partnership in the New World (1941)
- A Threefold Cord (1947), autobiography
