= International Congress of Women =

Feminist conference

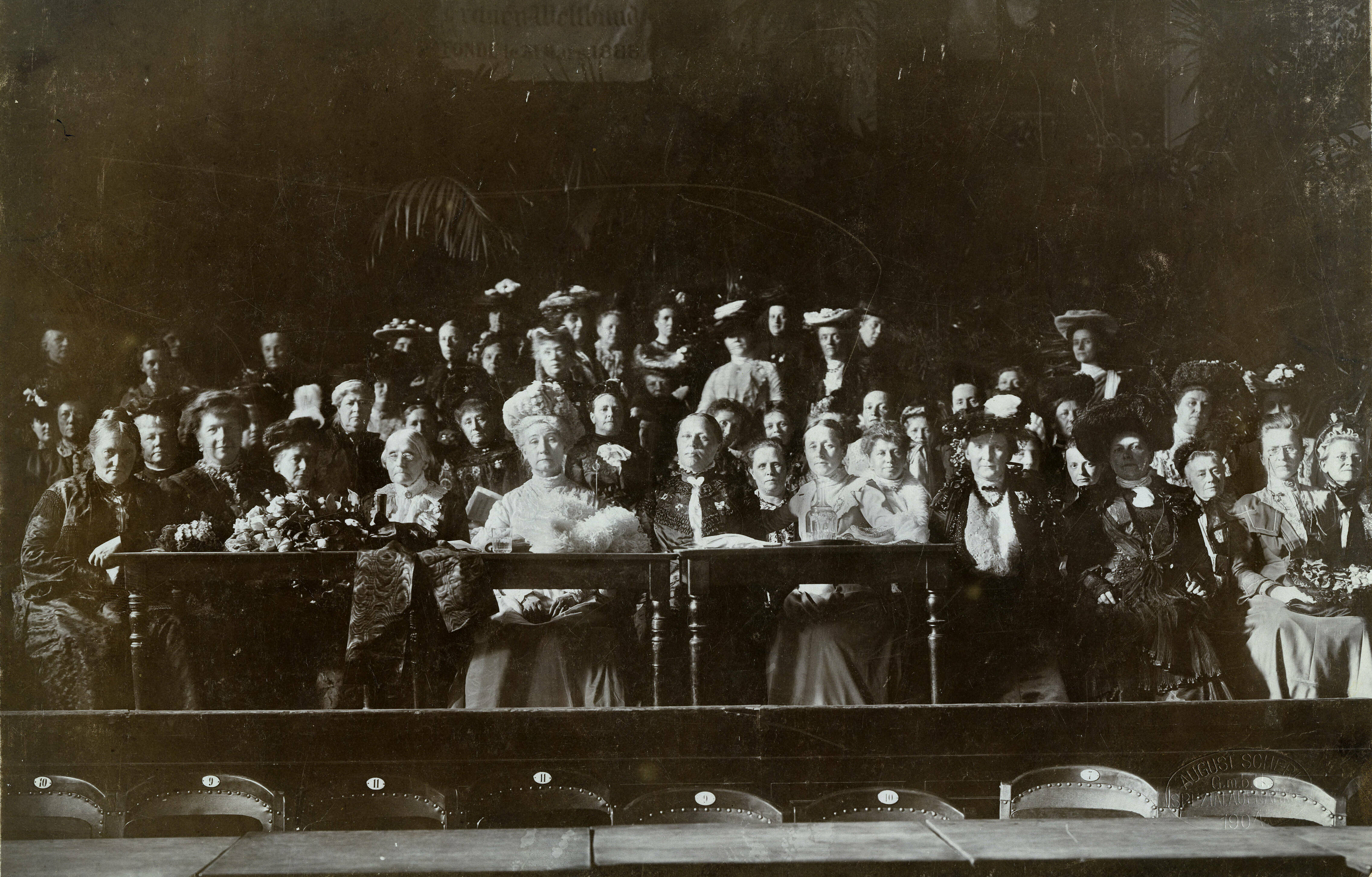
The officers of the U.S. National and International Council of Women at the congress held in Berlin, Germany in June, 1904. In the front row, the women seated at the tables (left to right), are Helene Lange, Ishbel Aberdeen, Susan B. Anthony, May Wright Sewall, Camille Vidart, and Teresa F. Wilson.

The International Congress of Women was created so that groups of existing women's suffrage movements could come together with other women's groups around the world. It served as a way for women organizations across the nation to establish formal means of communication and to provide more opportunities for women to ask the big questions relating to feminism at the time. The congress has been utilized by a number of feminist and pacifist events since 1878. A few groups that participated in the early conferences were The International Council of Women, The International Alliance of Women and The Women's International League for Peace and Freedom.

== Paris, 1878 ==
The First International Congress of Women's Rights convened in Paris in 1878 upon the occasion of the third Paris World's Fair. A historic event attended by many representatives, seven resolutions were passed at the meeting, beginning with the idea that "the adult woman is the equal of the adult man". The subject of women's suffrage was deliberately avoided at the Congress, as it was too controversial and not supported by all the attendees. Hubertine Auclert wrote a speech calling for the right to vote for French women, but was not allowed to present it to the Congress. Instead, she published it later. Emily Venturi gave a memorable closing speech, in which she declared

Last evening a gentleman who seemed a bit skeptical about the advantages of our congress asked me, ‘Well Madame, what great truth have you proclaimed to the world?’ I replied to him, ‘Monsieur, we have proclaimed a woman is a human being.’ He laughed. ‘But, Madame, that is a platitude.’ So it is; but when this platitude...is recognized by human laws, the face of the world will be transformed. Certainly, then, there would be not need for us to assembly in congress to demand the rights of woman.

— Karen Offen, European Feminisms: A Political History, 1700-1950, 2000

== London, 1899 ==
In 1899, the International Congress of Women convened alongside the International Council of Women in conjunction with its 2nd Quinquennial Meeting. The Congress was divided into 5 sections—each with their own individual area of focus for programming: Education, Professional, Political, Social, and Industrial and Legislative. The transactions of the Congress were edited by the then Countess of Aberdeen, who was president of the International Council of Women at the time of the congress, and published in a set along with the Report of Council Transactions from the International Congress of Women's 2nd Quinquennial meeting.

== Berlin, 1904 ==
This conference aimed its focus on four main sections; education, social work/institutions, the legal position of women (especially suffrage), and professions/job opportunities available to women. Officers of the German Council of Women were put in charge of this conference. At this conference, the International Woman Suffrage Alliance (IWSA) was founded. Mary Church Terrell—cofounder and first president of the National Association of Colored Women in Washington D.C.—was the only black women present at and spoke at this conference, she also went to the conference in Zurich in 1919. At the Berlin conference, Mary Church Terrell gave her speech titled “Progress and Problems of Colored Women."

== Amsterdam, 1908 ==
Among the many attendees at the Amsterdam convening of the International Congress of Women was Isabella Ford. Another important figure of the women's movement during the early 1900s who spoke at that conference was, Carrie Chapman Catt. During her discussion at the conference she spoke of the importance of women's history being part of the world's history.

Women traveled from South Africa and Australia to attend this conference in Amsterdam and to hear all about the success of the International Congress of Women. A male delegate from "Great Britain's Men's League for Women's Enfranchisement also attended. (see Men's League for Women's Suffrage)

== Toronto, 1909 ==
This congress was held under the auspices of the National Council of Women of Canada immediately following the 4th Quinquennial Meeting of the International Council of Women. Sessions were held on education, art, health, industries, laws concerning women and children, literature, professions for women, social work, and moral reform. Notable speakers included Jane Addams, Elizabeth Cadbury, Anna Hvoslef, Millicent Leveson-Gower, Duchess of Sutherland, Rosalie Slaughter Morton, Eliza Ritchie, Alice Salomon, and May Wright Sewall.

== Stockholm, 1911 ==
This conference was led by Carrie Chapman Catt. It was at this conference in Stockholm (1911) that eight men joined together and formed the Men's International Alliance for Women's Suffrage. The eight men who formed that alliance came from Great Britain, the U.S., France, Germany, and Holland.

== The Hague, 1915 ==
At the time that planning was in motion for this conference, the First World War was well underway and the conference was meant to be held in Berlin of 1915 but the war altered those plans. While the war may have caused the relocation of the conference, it was the war that had inspired this congress meeting. This congress—more commonly known and referred to as the Women's Peace Congress or just the Hague Congress—was a part of the emergent women's peace movement. More than 1,300 delegates from 12 countries came together at this conference to discuss and draft proposals—based in negotiation tactics— to end the First World War. Three major participants of the conference from the United States that attended were, Nobel Peace Prize winner Jane Addams, who attended as the president of the Woman's Peace Party (which was the precursor to the Women's International League for Peace and Freedom) and fellow Nobel Peace Prize winner, Professor Emily Greene Balch, and Alice Hamilton.

Other attendees included Lida Gustava Heymann, one of 28 delegates from Germany; Emmeline Pethick-Lawrence, Emily Hobhouse and Chrystal Macmillan from Great Britain; Rosika Schwimmer a Hungarian pacifist and feminist who won the World Peace Prize in 1937; Aletta Jacobs from Holand was another voice during this conference that spoke with other European women about promoting peace and then Emilia Fogelklou. Aletta Jacobs became a big advocate against the war in 1914 and asked other woman around the world to do the same. She was the women who invited the Women's Peace Party to the conference in The Netherlands where Jane Addams facilitated the meeting and recruited different groups of women to present their versions of peaceful resolutions to different countries.

Rosa Genoni was the sole delegate from Italy who attended this conference, representing a number of Italian women's organizations. She was one of the delegates nominated as envoys to visit belligerent and non-belligerent governments after the Congress to advocate for a halt to the war.

French women, during this time opted out of this event; they declared their intention not to attend nor support the Congress, and none attended. The planned 180-strong British delegation was severely reduced by the British government's suspension of the commercial ferry service between Folkestone and Flushing. and their reluctance to issue passports to proposed delegates.

In September 1915 a delegation went to the United States to meet president Woodrow Wilson to present the proposal for a "League of Neutral Counties" that could help mediating to end the war.

== Zurich, 1919 ==
This conference was held at the same time as the Paris Peace Conference in Versailles and hosted over 200 women coming in from 17 nations. One member commented that the German delegation was ‘scarred and shrivelled by hunger and privation, they were scarcely recognizable’. At this conference the women of the International Congress of Women regrouped to form a new organization, the Women's International League for Peace and Freedom. The main goals set forth by the Women's International League for Peace and Freedom at the Zurich Conference were based in the promotion of peace, creating equality, and establishing practices that work towards bringing the world together. Jane Addams was the coordinator of the Zurich congress meeting. It was at this meeting that Women's International League for Peace and Freedom explained their view about how the Treaty of Versailles may have ended the World War I but it was based in plans that could lead to another war.

== Vienna, 1921 ==
This congress ended with a short resolution entitled "Revision of peace treaties":

Believing that the Peace Treaties contain the seeds of new wars, this Congress declares that a revision of the Peace Terms is necessary, and resolves to make this object its principal task.
