= Political views of J. K. Rowling =

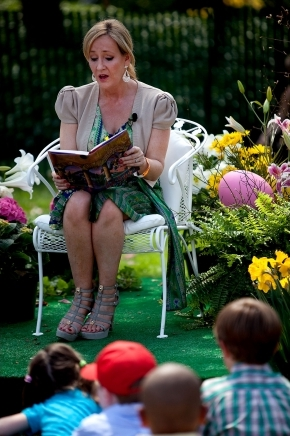
J. K. Rowling reads from Harry Potter and the Philosopher's Stone at the 2010 Easter Egg Roll at the White House.

The British author J. K. Rowling, the creator of Harry Potter and other Wizarding World works, has supported the Labour Party under Gordon Brown and criticised the party under Jeremy Corbyn and Keir Starmer. She has also opposed the American Republican Party under Donald Trump. She opposed Scottish independence in a 2014 referendum and Brexit during the 2016 referendum to leave the European Union.

Since late 2019, Rowling has publicly voiced her opinions on transgender rights and related issues. She has used language and expressed her views towards transgender people in a manner which has been referred to as transphobic by some LGBTQ rights organisations and feminists, although other feminists have supported her.

Rowling has stated that her politics are left-leaning, liberal and anti-authoritarian, pointing to her literary works to demonstrate this. She states that she is not an ideologue, distrusting ideologies, but is an idealist, believing in the human capacity for collaboration and mutual support. She holds that her political home is the pragmatic centre-left, where that is focused on dealing with economic disparity, championing social liberalism and equal rights. Whilst maintaining that she remains left-of-centre in her politics, she believes the left–right divide has been disrupted, and that the political left in the Western world has adopted a form of identity politics that is fundamentally illiberal.

== Harry Potter ==
Rowling's Harry Potter novels engage with real-world political issues and ideologies, reflecting Rowling's own views. She said, "I wanted Harry to leave our world and find exactly the same problems in the wizarding world." The works explore a wide range of real world political issues which include:

- Authoritarianism and fascism: A central theme of the books is the condemnation of authoritarianism and fascist policies. The books depict the dangers of pure-blood supremacy, discrimination, and the suppression of dissent, inviting parallels between Nazism and the Death Eaters.
- Liberal democracy: Her books explore democratic values such as equality, tolerance, free speech and the rule of law, and promote political participation among the young. The struggle against Voldemort is presented as a fight to preserve these values against those who seek to destroy them, although the wizarding world itself lacks visible means of democratic participation (Note: According to Bethany Barratt, "Wolusky argues that the 'most prominent allegory in Harry Potter, noted by Rowling and many others, is a political one' (Wolusky 34). Carey goes on to say that 'At the heart of the books . . . . is one message in particular: the promotion of political participation for young people' (Carey in Anatol 2009: 159). In fact Rowling nods to political satire throughout—many have speculated that Crookshanks was named for George Cruikshanks, a well-known Victorian political satirist. And Time magazine has called the books 'a 4100-page treatise on tolerance' (Granger 2009:150)".) and checks and balances on its power, and the books use this as a critique too. The importance of institutions and fair processes is highlighted, though not without acknowledging their flaws.
- Social inequality and prejudice: Rowling's books address issues of social inequality and prejudice, particularly through the treatment of house-elves, werewolves and other marginalised groups. The series critiques prejudice based on blood status and species.
- The importance of resistance and activism: The characters in the series, particularly Harry and his friends, demonstrate the power of individual and collective action in challenging oppressive forces.

The books examine the basis of power, the control of information and the role of the media and explore themes of justice, discipline and punishment. Some themes in the books are presented more ambiguously. For example, the Ministry of Magic is both bumbling, inefficient and corrupt, but also inhabited by key players, and with a layer of necessary legitimacy. This reflects a more nuanced understanding of real-world power structures.

== British politics ==
Rowling has been a long-time friend of Gordon Brown (Prime Minister of the United Kingdom from 2007 to 2010) and his wife, Sarah Brown. In September 2008 Rowling donated £1 million to the Labour Party and commended Brown's commitment to improving the lives of poor families. Rowling praised Brown in a 2009 Time magazine essay, saying she "still wanted him in charge". Rowling was critical of Jeremy Corbyn's leadership of Labour. In June 2024 Rowling wrote that she would struggle to support Labour under the leadership of Keir Starmer due to its stance on gender-related issues.

=== Scottish independence ===
As a resident of Edinburgh, Rowling was eligible to vote in the 2014 referendum on Scottish independence, and intended to vote No. She donated £1 million to the Better Together anti-independence campaign, led by her former neighbour and friend Alistair Darling, and used the "Death Eaters" characters from her Harry Potter series – who reject wizards unless they have pure blood – as a reference in her explanation of her donation: "when people try to make this debate about the purity of your lineage, things start getting a little Death Eaterish for my taste". In Rowling's post-donation blog post in mid-June 2014, she explained that she is "friendly" with members of both campaigns and stated a belief that "there are intelligent, thoughtful people on both sides of this question".

In 2018 Rowling wrote on Twitter that she was tired of "blood and soil ethno-nationalists marching with" civic campaigners. She also stated that Scottish nationalism "contains traces of bigotry".

=== European migrant crisis ===
Rowling spoke out during the European migrant crisis of 2015, expressing her support for refugees. She was credited with rallying support for an online petition calling on the Conservative government to accept more refugees, with a Twitter post in which she said "If you can't imagine yourself in one of those boats, you have something missing. They are dying for a life worth living." The government responded to the petition by agreeing to take more refugees.

She also joined other authors to spearhead a fundraising campaign for charities working with refugees.

=== Brexit ===
Rowling opposed Brexit and campaigned for the United Kingdom to remain in the European Union, in the run-up to the 2016 referendum to leave the European Union, stating on her website that "I'm the mongrel product of this European continent and I'm an internationalist. I was raised by a Francophile mother whose family was proud of their part-French heritage .... My values are not contained or proscribed by borders. The absence of a visa when I cross the channel has symbolic value to me. I might not be in my house, but I'm still in my hometown."

Rowling expressed concern that "racists and bigots" were directing parts of the Leave campaign. In a blog post, she added: "How can a retreat into selfish and insecure individualism be the right response when Europe faces genuine threats, when the bonds that tie us are so powerful, when we have come so far together? How can we hope to conquer the enormous challenges of terrorism and climate change without cooperation and collaboration?"

== International politics ==
=== United States ===
Rowling told a Spanish newspaper in February 2008 that the politics of the United States had negatively impacted not only the US, but the UK as well; she stated that "it is a pity that Clinton and Obama have to be rivals because both are extraordinary."

Rowling advised the 2008 graduating class of Harvard University, "the great majority of you belong to the world's only remaining superpower. The way you vote, the way you live, the way you protest, the pressure you bring to bear on your government, has an impact way beyond your borders. That is your privilege, and your burden."

Rowling made analogies between Donald Trump and Voldemort after Trump called for a ban on Muslims entering the United States on 7 December 2015.

==== Native American issues ====
On 7 October 2016 Rowling released on Pottermore four pieces of writing exclusively as an introduction to the film Fantastic Beasts and Where to Find Them, titled History of Magic in North America. It included her fictionalised ideas of "Native American Magic." Her use of Native American religious figures and symbolism from contemporary, living cultures for this work of fiction was met with protests by Native American communities; she was accused of racial insensitivity, violation of intellectual property rights, disrespect and appropriating "Native traditions while erasing Native peoples." While usually friendly and actively engaged with her fanbase on social media, after answering one question about her interpretation of skinwalkers that resulted in "thousands of tweets directed at her about these concerns", The Washington Post wrote that "Native people took to Twitter to voice their disappointment and demand a response from Rowling, who has not answered her detractors online." "She has not addressed it at all", wrote Adrienne Keene. "The silence is noted, and it's deafening."

=== Ukraine ===
In response to the Russian invasion of Ukraine in 2022, Rowling expressed support for Ukraine, pledging to match funding for aid to children trapped in orphanages in Ukraine. She also expressed opposition to Russian president Vladimir Putin.

In a speech on 25 March 2022, Putin alleged that Russian culture was being "cancelled" in Western countries, and compared Russia to Rowling "[falling] out of favour with fans of so-called gender freedoms" in reference to her views on transgender people. Rowling rejected Putin's comparison, saying criticism of cancel culture is "possibly not best made" by people who kill civilians or imprison their critics.

=== Israel ===
On 22 October 2015 a letter was published in The Guardian signed by Rowling (along with over 150 other figures from arts and politics) opposing the cultural boycott of Israel, and announcing the creation of a network for dialogue, called Culture for Coexistence. Rowling later explained her position in more detail, saying that although she opposed most of Israeli prime minister Benjamin Netanyahu's actions, she did not think cultural boycotts would bring about his removal or help improve the situation in Israel and Palestine.

=== Iran ===
On 11 January 2026 Rowling addressed the protests and the massacres in Iran on a post on X, accusing many of the global activist community of "selective activism" for failing to show solidarity with Iranians fighting for freedom. Her claim was that many of those who claim to care about human rights but remain silent on the situation in Iran reveal their true priorities. The post that also showed a woman's caricature, lighting a cigarette from the flames of a burning image of Iranian Supreme Leader Ayatollah Ali Khamenei, went viral and provoked a polarised reaction online, with some praising her for drawing attention to the protests, while others criticised her for what they saw as inconsistency in her engagement with other global human rights issues.

== Free speech ==
In January 2009, Rowling wrote about what it meant to be British, saying, "It means a welfare state of which we should be fiercely proud and a tradition of tolerance and free speech we should defend to our last collective breath."

=== A Letter on Justice and Open Debate ===
In July 2020 Rowling signed an open letter published in Harper's Magazine titled "A Letter on Justice and Open Debate", with 150 other public figures, largely writers and academics. The letter states in part, "The free exchange of information and ideas, the lifeblood of a liberal society, is daily becoming more constricted", criticises "a vogue for public shaming and ostracism" and "a blinding moral certainty", warns of fear spreading in the arts and media, and denounces US President Donald Trump as "a real threat to democracy".

Objections to the letter included accusations that Rowling and the other signatories had powerful means to publish their opinions, and that it was disingenuous to attempt to silence others who might offer criticism of their views. Some thought that Rowling was trying to specifically suppress criticism about her statements concerning transgender topics. After learning who also signed the letter, Jennifer Finney Boylan expressed regret over her support, and stated she would not have signed had she known who the other signatories were. Several of the signers defended their letter, describing it as a stand against what they called the "forces of illiberalism".

== Gender and sexuality ==
=== Transgender people ===
Rowling's responses to proposed changes to Scottish gender recognition laws and her views on sex and gender have provoked controversy. She has been critical of self-declared gender identity. Her statements have divided feminists, fuelled debates on freedom of speech and cancel culture, and prompted support for transgender people from the arts sector. Her statements have been deemed transphobic by critics and she has been referred to as a TERF (trans-exclusionary radical feminist) in response to comments she made on Twitter. She rejects these characterisations. As her views on transgender issues came under scrutiny, Rowling stated that she has received death threats.

Rowling's views on trans individuals were first noticed in 2017 when she used a Twitter like to share an article that was critical of proposed changes to the UK Gender Recognition Act (2004).. However, it was not until the following year that her views on transgender people became widely discussed, when she liked a tweet that described trans women as "men in dresses". This was criticised by some of her fans and some media outlets who accused her of being transphobic. Her spokesperson told PinkNews that Rowling had favourited the tweet by mistake. In December 2019 Rowling tweeted support for Maya Forstater, whose contract was not renewed with the Center for Global Development due to these complaints about her gender-critical views, and who was the subject of Forstater v Centre for Global Development Europe. In 2020 Rowling spoke out against a Devex article for using the phrase "people who menstruate" instead of "women". She stated that "erasing the concept of sex" erases the experiences of women worldwide and eliminates the possibility of same-sex attraction. Responding to criticism, she stated her view that "sex is real and has lived consequences", adding: "I respect every trans person's right to live any way that feels authentic and comfortable to them."

Rowling published an essay on her personal website in 2020 in which she expressed a number of concerns about what she called the "new trans activism". Rowling characterises arguments that femaleness does not reside in the sexed body, and assertions that "biological women" do not have common experiences, as being misogynistic. She finds language calling females "menstruators" to be dehumanising, and she believes that the trans activist movement seeks to erode women as a political class as well as a biological one. She also said that the attempt to redefine the legal definition of sex in terms of gender would put safe spaces for women at risk. She said she was concerned that girls were transitioning in order to escape sexism. Identifying herself as a survivor of domestic abuse and sexual assault, she claimed that "When you throw open the doors of bathrooms and changing rooms to any man who believes or feels he's a woman...then you open the door to any and all men who wish to come inside". She also stated in her essay: "I believe the majority of trans-identified people not only pose zero threat to others, but are vulnerable ... trans people need and deserve protection ... I feel nothing but empathy and solidarity with trans women who've been abused by men."

Among those who disputed the claims in Rowling's essay were the LGBTQ rights charity Stonewall and Mermaids, a charity for gender non-conforming children, which criticised Rowling for what it saw as her conflating "trans women with male sexual predators". Women's rights groups in the United States had said in 2016 that 200 municipalities which allowed transgender people to use women's shelters reported no rise in violence.

Rowling believes that "no child is 'born in the wrong body'," arguing that adults are promoting an ideology that bodies can be modified, which will prove harmful in the future. She has criticised schools for affirming trans identities without parental consent, and argues that parents may be protecting their children from a cultural assumption that anxieties about sexuality and puberty can be resolved by solutions that require lifelong dependence of pharmaceutical interventions. She has said that she "never set out to upset anyone" but was "not uncomfortable with getting off my pedestal." Neither is she concerned, she explained, about how her opposition to trans rights will affect her legacy. Rowling contends the term cisgender is "ideological language signifying belief in the unfalsifiable concept of gender identity." She has stated that her beliefs arise out of a sincere concern for transgender people, and in particular, young transgender men, saying, "I'm concerned about the huge explosion in young women wishing to transition and also about the increasing numbers who seem to be detransitioning."

Rowling opposes legislation to advance gender self-recognition and enable transition without a medical diagnosis (gender self-identification), and criticised Labour Party leader Keir Starmer, who said "trans women are women" in his personal opinion and according to British law. She accused him of misrepresenting the law. She also voiced opposition to the Scottish Gender Recognition Reform Bill, aimed at allowing transgender people to change their legal gender more easily, and subsequently she donated £70,000 to the legal challenge brought by For Women Scotland against the Scottish Ministers in the Supreme Court of the United Kingdom, which on 16 April 2025 ruled that the legal definition of a woman in the Equality Act 2010 is based on biological sex.

In response to Edinburgh's rape crisis centre being run by a trans woman, Mridul Wadhwa, Rowling established a sexual assault crisis centre that does not provide services to trans women, Beira's Place, in December 2022. The Guardian quoted rape crisis specialists as saying it "would provide much-needed extra provision, because existing services were being overwhelmed by new cases" and noted that "under the Equality Act, services that exclude trans women are lawful if they are proportionate and legitimate". In response to a fan praising this decision, Rowling tweeted "Merry Terfmas". Rowling has also expressed her opposition to the Hate Crime and Public Order (Scotland) Act 2021, and when this went into effect in April 2024, she deliberately misgendered several transgender women to challenge the new law. Throughout the thread, Rowling sarcastically referred to all the people as female, but at the end clarified, "Obviously, the people mentioned in the above tweets aren't women at all, but men, every last one of them." Rowling said that, if her comments were illegal under the new law, she "looked forward to being arrested". Later, a spokesperson for Police Scotland said that Rowling's statements were "not assessed to be criminal and no further action will be taken." The prime minister, Rishi Sunak, defended Rowling, saying, "We should not be criminalising people saying common sense on biological sex".

==== Reactions ====
Within days of the publication of Rowling's 2020 essay, Daniel Radcliffe, who portrayed the titular character in the Harry Potter film series, voiced his support of transgender people, and stating his own belief that trans women are women. Other actors of the Wizarding World franchise who either criticised her views directly or spoke out in support of trans rights include Emma Watson, Eddie Redmayne, Rupert Grint, Bonnie Wright, and Katie Leung. Stephen Fry, who narrated the Harry Potter audiobooks, has said Rowling may have been "radicalised by TERFs" and "the vitriol that is thrown at her" and that, as a result, she had said "things that are inflammatory and contemptuous, mocking and add[ing] to a terribly distressing time for trans people". A public backlash to Rowling's Twitter interactions also saw calls for her "cancellation" and to ignore her opinions.

Some actors in the Wizarding World franchise have come to Rowling's defence. Helena Bonham Carter, Robbie Coltrane and Ralph Fiennes spoke out in support of Rowling. The actress Noma Dumezweni initially expressed support for Rowling but rescinded this following backlash. Evanna Lynch initially criticised Rowling's views but later condemned the intense backlash against her. Other performers and activists have supported Rowling and condemned comments against her, including Julie Bindel, Dave Chappelle and Kathleen Stock. Conversely, others, including David Tennant, Pedro Pascal, Charlotte Clymer and Nicola Coughlan, have criticised Rowling over her comments on transgender people. The former prime minister Tony Blair expressed his belief in 2021 that Labour could not win a general election if it "looked askance" at Rowling's views on transgender people, calling for open debate on the issue.

The reaction of Warner Bros. Entertainment was measured, but increasingly stressed the collaborative nature of the Harry Potter brand. Warner Bros and Universal Studios Parks & Resorts released statements in June 2020, emphasising their prioritisation of LGBTQ inclusion and diversity, but did not directly mention Rowling or her comments. In June 2020 the Equality Act was blocked in the United States Senate. The Republican Party senator James Lankford cited Rowling's essay as part of his reasoning for opposing the bill. Four authors resigned in protest from the Blair Partnership, Rowling's literary agency, after the company refused to issue a public statement of support for trans rights, saying that "freedom of speech can only be upheld if the structural inequalities that hinder equal opportunities for underrepresented groups are challenged and changed."

In July 2020, following the threat of legal action, the British children's news website The Day publicly apologised to Rowling after publishing an article that suggested her comments caused harm to and attacked transgender people, made comparisons between Rowling's views and those of Richard Wagner on race and Pablo Picasso on women, and called for her work to be boycotted. The publication agreed to pay an undisclosed sum to a charity of Rowling's choice. Rowling returned her Robert F. Kennedy Human Rights Ripple of Hope Award in August 2020, after the organisation's president Kerry Kennedy called her statements "deeply troubling", "transphobic", and degrading towards transgender people. Rowling stated that she was "deeply saddened" to be returning the award, reiterating her admiration for Robert F. Kennedy, but said that no award "means so much to me that I would forfeit the right to follow the dictates of my own conscience."

Her comments towards transgender people were labelled "cruel" and "anti-trans" by the media advocacy group GLAAD. The fansites MuggleNet and The Leaky Cauldron have expressed criticism towards Rowling.

In September 2020 a letter in support of Rowling, signed by 58 entertainers and authors, including Ian McEwan, the actress Frances Barber, the playwright Tom Stoppard and the actor Griff Rhys Jones, was published in The Sunday Times. The letter condemned the "onslaught of abuse" directed at Rowling on social media, describing such behaviour as an "insidious, authoritarian and misogynistic trend". The actor Eddie Redmayne similarly condemned the abuse targeted at Rowling, whilst also condemning the abuse towards transgender people. The genderfluid comedian and actor Eddie Izzard stated that she does not consider Rowling transphobic and encouraged people to read Rowling's work about the topic. In an interview with New Statesman, the philosopher and gender theorist Judith Butler agreed that Rowling should not be subject to abuse, but urged people to oppose any form of abuse against transgender people.

=== Asexual people ===
Rowling does not believe asexual people are subject to discrimination nor that they belong in the LGBTQ community. She implied that asexuality is incompatible with romantic attraction, doubting how an asexual person can distinguish whether they are romantically gay or straight and described asexual people as merely being straight people who do not want to have sex.

On International Asexuality Day (IAD) 2025, Rowling posted an IAD infographic by Switchboard accompanied by a sentence framing it as "fake oppression day". She contrasted the murder of gay people in homophobic countries with asexuals, whom she claimed merely get "ignored to death". She incorporated "gender activists" and their "trans agenda" in her argument, and also described how, in her view, excluding people who merely dislike sex from "the gay category" was stigmatised.

Reactions

In response to her IAD statements, Tyger Songbird from LGBTQ Nation said that asexuals do suffer discrimination and described several aspects of acephobia, such as dehumanisation, intimate violence and conversion therapy. Maïlis Rey-Bethbeder from Le Parisien framed said statements as hostile towards the asexual community and noted that 12% of French people identify as asexuals. Lola Uguen of Elle had similar arguments. Fiona Ward and Hannah Madlener from Glamour DE specified that asexuality does exist. Federico Boni from Gay.it argued JKR's statements on asexuals were fuelling misinformation.

Yasmin Benoit, an asexual activist who co-created International Asexuality Day, stated that "A lot of people's introduction [to International Asexuality Day] has now been through JK Rowling hating on it" and noted she was seeing a negative conversation about asexuality in spaces where it was previously absent, stating that Rowling "hijacked the occasion" and describing her views as "acephobia".

Rowling's views on asexuality have also been described as related to her views on transgender people.

== Eating disorders ==
In 2006 Rowling criticised skinny models, stating that their "only function in the world appears to be supporting the trade in overpriced handbags and rat-sized dogs". She condemned societal beauty standards in "this skinny-obsessed world" and magazine covers that feature people who are "either seriously ill or suffering from an eating disorder".

Rowling was criticised both for her comments on underweight people – hoping her daughters would not become "empty-headed, self-obsessed, emaciated clones" – and for the portrayal of overweight people in Harry Potter; Rowling responded that Harry Potter characters who are "on the plumper side" include "several of my most important, admirable and lovable characters".

== Abortion ==
In 2017 Rowling expressed her opposition to the Mexico City Policy, which blocked US government support for international organisations that provided abortion counselling, when the policy was reinstated by Donald Trump, and said that she supported abortion rights, especially in underdeveloped countries. In 2022 she said she thinks all women should have the right to "safe, legal abortion should they wish to terminate a pregnancy."

== See also ==
- Politics of Harry Potter
