= Mridul Wadhwa =

Women's rights and anti-violence campaigner

Mridul Machindra Wadhwa (born 1978) is an Indian-born Scottish-based women's rights, trans rights, and anti-domestic violence campaigner. She is a director and co-founder of data company Vahanomy. She previously was the chief executive officer of Edinburgh Rape Crisis Centre. She was formerly active in the Scottish National Party, a candidate for the party in the 2021 Scottish Parliament election, before moving to the Scottish Green Party. Wadhwa has been the subject of harassment by anti-trans activists since 2019.

== Early life and education ==
Mridul Wadhwa is a transgender woman who was born in India in 1978 and transitioned there. She lived in Pune until 30, where she ran a successful business with her husband. She then emigrated to the United Kingdom in 2002 with her passport listing her as female, where she earned a master's degree in education from the University of Edinburgh in 2005. She permanently settled in Scotland in 2009. She became involved in women's rights activism in Scotland as a student, and has spoken about her focus on giving voice to women from marginalised backgrounds, including migrant and racialised women.

== Career ==
=== Equality and anti-violence sector ===
Wadhwa has worked in the equality and anti-violence sectors in Scotland since leaving university in 2005. She was the information and education officer and children's services team leader at Shakti Women's Aid from 2008 to 2017, a training and volunteer coordinator at Rape Crisis Scotland from 2014 to 2018, and the manager at Forth Valley Rape Crisis Centre from 2018 to 2021. She was also a board member of YWCA Scotland and of the Equality Network from 2017 to 2021. Wadhwa became the chief executive officer of Edinburgh Rape Crisis Centre in 2021.

=== Political career ===
Wadhwa stood as one of three Scottish National Party candidates for the Craigentinny/Duddingston ward at the 2017 City of Edinburgh Council election, but was not elected.

In October 2020, Wadhwa sought SNP candidacy for MSP for Edinburgh Central and Stirling constituencies for the upcoming 2021 Scottish Parliament election. Campaign group For Women Scotland said that the party had broken the Equality Act by placing her on an all female shortlist due to Wadhwa not having a gender recognition certificate. Wadhwa quit the party due to what she described as multiple attacks motivated by her interest in leadership positions within the party; according to Wadhwa, her colleagues angrily objected to her being listed on an all-woman candidate list due to her status as a transgender woman. Wadhwa stated she would still vote for Scottish Independence. She left the SNP after MSPs backed an amendment to allow survivors of rape and sexual violence to pick the sex rather than the gender of the person examining them.

=== Harassment ===
Wadhwa began receiving abuse in 2019, while working as the director of the Forth Valley rape crisis centre in Stirling. In 2020, she stated coverage of claims calling her "legally male" unleashed a "host of hate". She described the focus on whether she had a Gender Recognition Certificate racist as well as transphobic for failing to account for Indian cultural norms as she transitioned in India and emigrated to the UK with her passport stating she was female. The abuse intensified after she announced her candidacy as an SNP MSP in the 2021 Scottish Parliament election, and intensified again after her appointment as director of the Edinburgh Rape Crisis Centre (ERCC). The abuse received at the ERCC included hate speech on social media and on phone calls, letters and emails containing baseless accusations of predatory behaviour, racist commentary, and threats of vigilante violence. Nearly all comments intentionally misgendered Wadhwa.

Articles criticising Wadhwa were published on the websites of Wings Over Scotland and The Christian Institute, with the series of articles by The Christian Institute amplified by the United States-based Christian Today and Life Site News. YouTuber Kellie-Jay Keen-Minshull released a video which, according to OpenDemocracy, "made a series of unfounded and unevidenced accusations about Wadhwa and her work". Referring to Graham Linehan, OpenDemocracy said "the first time Wadhwa says she truly feared for her life was when Linehan published part of her home address". In August 2021, as part of this harassment campaign, the hashtag #AskRapeCrisisScotland began trending on Twitter and was amplified by For Women Scotland. An analysis by the Trans Safety Network revealed that the approximately 4,800 tweets using the hashtag came from approximately 240 accounts and nearly half came from 30 accounts.

On 13 August 2021, the Scottish Green Party issued a statement in solidarity with Wadhwa after the abuse, denouncing the spread of misinformation about the crisis centres and resulting abuse which posed a threat to survivors and workers at the centre. By Autumn 2021, as a result of the harassment and following police advice and consultations with security experts, the ERCC ended their open door policy, and installed both an intercom system for access and a reinforced inner door.

=== Guilty Feminist podcast comments ===
In an interview on the Guilty Feminist podcast, Wadhwa stated:

So we might have fear of men of a certain ethnicity, we might have fear of trans people, and it could be linked to an experience of trauma. I think it is, it is okay to hold those things as long as you are willing to acknowledge that, in support, we will accept that ... the other thing is that sexual violence happens to bigoted people as well. And so, you know, it is not discerning crime. But these spaces are also for you. But if you bring unacceptable beliefs that are discriminatory in nature, we will begin to work with you on your journey of recovery from trauma. But please also expect to be challenged on your prejudices.

Wadhwa's comments were criticized, including by For Women Scotland and sexual violence researcher Jessica Taylor, who argued Wadhwa was calling women who wanted "female only spaces" bigots. JK Rowling stated that Wadhwa's comments inspired her to create Beira's Place, a support centre which does not hire or serve trans women.

Wadhwa said her words were taken out context as the bigotry referred to racism, homophobia, ableism, classism, and transphobia. She stated while the ERCC would take in any women needing help, "if what we see/hear from someone is clearly prejudiced and we are not responding to their urgent support need it is also part of our role to provide a space to explore and challenge this, in as kind a way as possible" and "In order for us to create a safe space for survivors it also needs to be a safe space for staff and volunteers, where everyone feels valued, safe and respected."

=== Discrimination claim for gender-critical beliefs ===
In May 2024, an employment tribunal gave a decision in favour of Roz Adams, who was constructively dismissed by Edinburgh Rape Crisis Centre. The tribunal found Adams, who identifies as a "sex realist", had been unfairly targeted due to her gender-critical belief that service users should be able to specify the sex of their support staff.

The disciplinary process, which the tribunal described as "completely spurious and mishandled", began after Adams sought clarity on how to respond to a survivor who asked the sex of a non-binary employee. The investigation upheld the allegations of misconduct against her without action, at which point Adams resigned and began working for Beira's Place. The employment judge said that Wadhwa, the Centre's CEO, had been involved in the disciplinary process, and referred to Wadhwa as being behind a 'heresy hunt' against Adams which was "somewhat reminiscent of the works of Franz Kafka". As a result of this ruling, Wadhwa was placed on leave while her role in the activity leading to the ruling was being investigated. In November 2024, the tribunal ruled that ERCC must pay Adams £68,989.71 as compensation for discrimination, constructive dismissal, and emotional pain and suffering. ERCC was also ordered to make a public apology to Adams on its website, and to refer sexual assault survivors to Beira's Place.

=== Resignation from Edinburgh Rape Crisis Centre ===
In September 2024, Wadhwa resigned from the ERCC following a review commissioned by Rape Crisis Scotland. The review said the centre had only provided "women-only" spaces, defined as "provided by someone who was born and continues to identify as female" (i.e. cisgender women), on request and this did "not amount to the provision of protected ‘women-only’ spaces". The report also said that the centre had failed to make clear the birth sex of every staff member. It said this policy "did not put survivors first", "caused damage" to them, and failed to meet national service standards. The review found 93 percent of survivors felt hopeful about their future after their time with the ERCC. It noted only 2 instances of survivors avoiding the ERCC as a result of their policies: one chose not to use their services due to fears of their assigned staff members assigned gender at birth and the other chose not to use the service though she was assured she could request to see a cisgender woman.

== Awards ==
Wadhwa received the "Outstanding Campaigner Award" of the Equality Network in 2015.
