= Reem Alsalem =

Jordanian civil servant

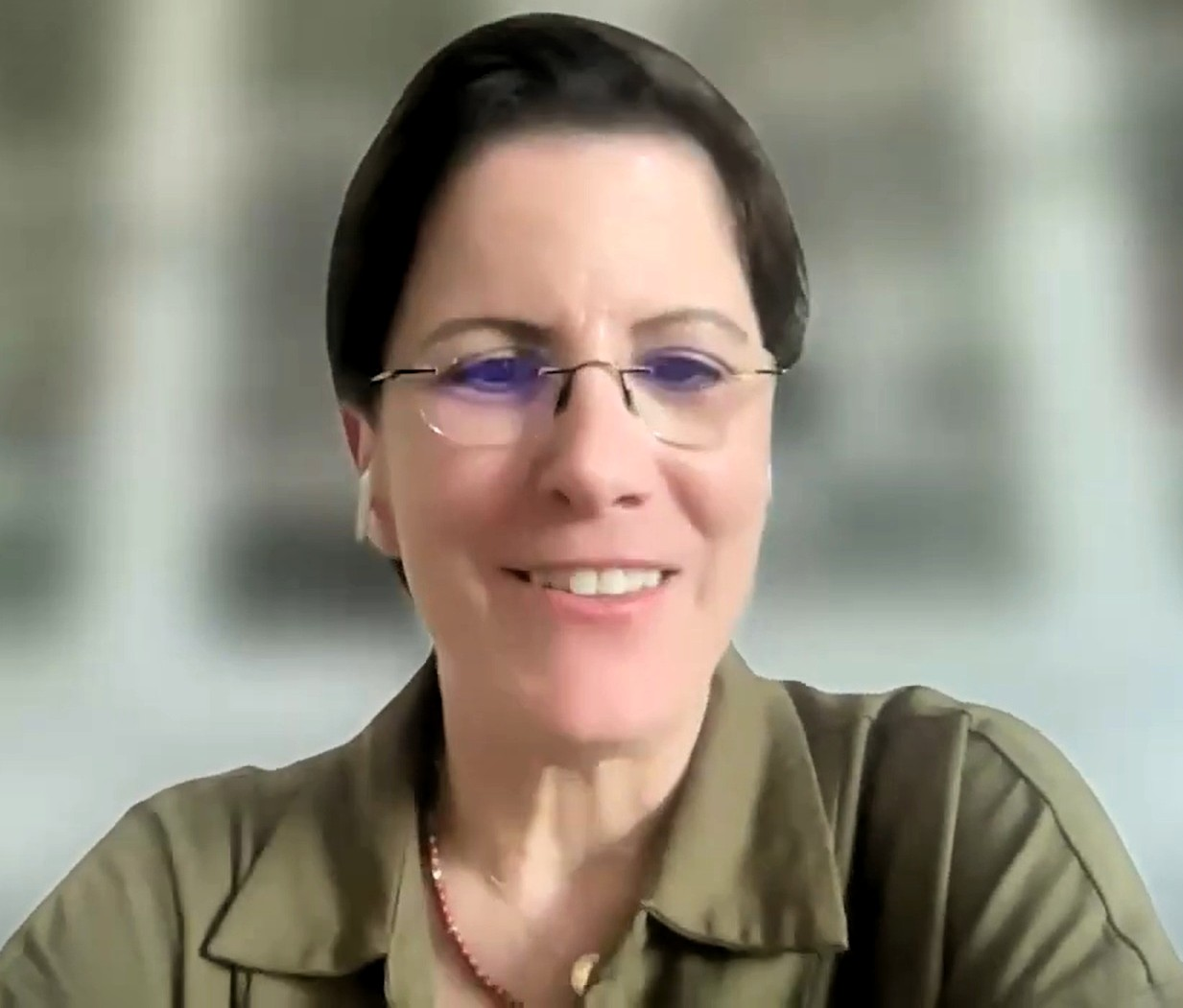
- Alsalem in 2025

United Nations Special Rapporteur on Violence Against Women and Girls
- Incumbent
- Assumed office 1 August 2021
- Preceded by: Dubravka Šimonović

Personal details
- Occupation: Independent consultant
- Website: Official website

Reem Alsalem (Arabic: ريم السالم) (born 1976) is a Jordanian consultant on gender and humanitarian issues who has served as the United Nations Special Rapporteur on violence against women and girls since August 2021. Sandra Duffy describes Alsalem as having espoused gender-critical views in interventions in UK policy debates, including over Scottish gender-recognition reform. Other scholars have criticised her positions as undermining transgender rights.

== Biography ==
Alsalem was born in Cairo, Egypt, in 1976. She was educated at the American University in Cairo where she completed a master's degree in international relations in 2001. She subsequently graduated from the University of Oxford in 2003 with a masters in human rights law.

She was employed for 17 years as an international civil servant by the UNHCR where she worked with refugees in 13 countries. She left in 2016 to work as an independent consultant on humanitarian and gender issues. She speaks Arabic, English, French, German and Spanish.

In 2021, Alsalem was one of 27 candidates who applied for the role of United Nations Special Rapporteur on violence against women and girls. After she was elected as special rapporteur by the Human Rights Council, she listed five priorities for her work there, including intersections between gender-based violence against women, sexual orientation and gender identity and expression, violence against indigenous women and girls, gender-based violence in the context of disaster risk reduction and climate change, psychological violence against women, and the relationship between the condition of statelessness, gender, and gender-based violence.

== Viewpoints ==
=== Transgender people ===
Alsalem has promoted gender-critical views. Legal scholar Sandra Duffy cites Alsalem's promotion of gender-critical views as a prominent instance of anti-gender lobbying against transgender rights in the United Kingdom, observing that her intervention, made eleven days after the United Nations Independent Expert on sexual orientation and gender identity warned of the hostile climate facing transgender people, seemed intended as a pointed rebuttal. Feminist scholar Mariana Meriqui Rodrigues described Alsalem as an anti-trans actor within the UN system who has "consistently argued for further barriers and restrictions on legal gender recognition that undercut the rights of transgender individuals". Legal scholars Tamsin Phillipa Paige and Claerwen O'Hara describe Alsalem as part of an increasingly aggressive anti-queer and transphobic movement that is now active also in legal circles. Her work has been denounced by hundreds of human rights and medical groups as an abuse of her position.

In 2023 Alsalem attended the gender-critical FiLiA conference amid protests against the conference. The same year, an open letter published by the Association for Women's Rights in Development (AWID), endorsed by over 550 NGOs and women's groups, accused her of being "anti-trans", which she denies. In July, legal scholar Jens Theilen said that Alsalem "is using women's rights as a tool to undermine trans rights" and considered her actions "a stark example of individual politics furthering rather than contesting oppression", citing the AWID letter.

In 2025 Alsalem said she has faced "relentless" opposition from governments, international organizations and civil society over her trans-related views, and that those critics had called her regressive, racist, transphobic, and fascist. The Catholic Zenit News Agency also wrote that Alsalem has been "ostracized by the global women's rights establishment" because she opposes "gender ideology", and that she has faced strong criticism both from women's organizations and within the UN system for her views on trans people.

In January 2024, Alsalem criticised the composition of a World Health Organization (WHO) committee, saying that most committee members had "strong, one-sided views in favour of promoting hormonal gender transition and legal recognition of self-asserted gender" and that none of them was an expert in adolescent development. In February, she opposed the Gender Recognition Reform (Scotland) Bill and claimed it could "open the door for violent males". Her views were disputed by the United Nations Independent Expert on sexual orientation and gender identity, Victor Madrigal-Borloz, and the spokesperson for the United Nations High Commissioner for Human Rights who said that "everyone [...] should have access to legal recognition of their gender identity based on self-identification." Six feminist organizations in Scotland—Engender, JustRight Scotland, Scottish Women's Rights Centre, Scottish Women's Aid, Amnesty International Scotland and Rape Crisis Scotland—also expressed disappointment by Alsalem's comments, accusing her of failing to speak with Scottish human rights or feminist organisations before her statements.

In April, Alsalem opposed President Biden's Title IX policies for transgender youth in the United States.

In October Alsalem also criticized the Self-Determination Act that entered into force in Germany. International law scholar Selin Altay criticized Alsalem for her position on the Self-Determination Act, saying that Alsalem has long faced criticism for holding anti-trans views. Altay argues that Alsalem fails to fulfill her mandate as special rapporteur if she does not actively defend the right to gender self-determination. According to Altay, Alsalem is responsible for addressing all forms of violence against women at the international level, including violence against trans women falls within her mandate to uphold the right to gender self-determination.

In February 2025, Alsalem supported Donald Trump's executive order "Keeping Men Out of Women's Sports", which allows the federal government to withhold funding from schools which allow transgender students to compete on women's teams and refers to trans women as "men". Alsalem also urged the United States to create open sports categories so that no athlete is left behind.

In July Alsalem presented her report "Sex-based violence against women and girls". The report called on states to "ensure that the terms 'women' and 'girls' are only used to describe biological females" and referred to trans women as "males who identify as women or girls". It claimed there are "long-lasting and harmful consequences of social and medical transitioning" and recommended banning medical and social transition for minors and providing them psychological treatment to "address underlying neuro-developmental, psychological, or other conditions". It praised restrictions on trans healthcare in the Netherlands, the U.K., and Brazil. It falsely claimed 80% of "childhood gender distress" would disappear at puberty, that "female detransitioners" were overwhelmingly gay and transitioned due to internalized homophobia, and that autistic children are developing socially contagious gender dysphoria as a coping strategy. It cited anti-trans organizations such as LGB Alliance and For Women Scotland. The report claimed that trans identities threaten to erase women and praised the outcome of For Women Scotland Ltd v The Scottish Ministers. The report was criticized by LGBT advocates and researchers such as the Human Rights Campaign, OutRight Action International. The Christian advocacy group Alliance Defending Freedom supported Alsalem for resisting "gender ideology".

=== Views on prostitution and pornography ===
Alsalem has expressed support for the abolitionist approach to prostitution and voiced opposition to the pornography industry. She developed these views in her thematic report titled Prostitution and violence against women and girls, presented to the Human Rights Council in June 2024. She says prostitution is a consequence of patriarchal structures, economic inequalities, and conflict situations. She also highlights the intersection of racism and prostitution, saying that women and girls from marginalised groups, particularly those facing multiple forms of discrimination, are disproportionately affected and often enter the sex trade due to socioeconomic precarity. Alsalem supports implementing the Nordic model approach to prostitution across the United Kingdom.

Alsalem believes that the widespread availability of pornography perpetuates gender stereotypes and violence against women. She says that pornography teaches boys that committing violence and degrading girls is a normal part of sexual relations. A comprehensive approach to pornography focusing on sexual education was needed beyond just regulation and criminalisation.

Legal and feminist scholars criticized Alsalem, saying that she misused evidence and ignored dissenting voices in her report on "prostitution and violence"; they wrote that "there is no agreement in international human rights law about what laws best protect the rights of people who sell sex" and that "evidence is strong that criminal law making both the buying and selling of sex a crime hurts the very people who are most at risk".

=== 7 October attack and Gaza War ===
Alsalem was criticised in 2023 by Claire Waxman, London's Victims' Commissioner, as she did not speak out on reports of sexual and gender-based violence in the 7 October attack on Israel against Israeli women during and following the Hamas-led attack. In response, Alsalem said she had condemned "what happened on 7 October", had contacted NGOs in Israel without reply, and said she could not make "sweeping statements" without receiving evidence. She later falsely claimed in 2025 that "No independent investigation found that rape took place on the 7th of October" despite a UN report about Hamas’s use of sexual violence that day.

In 2024, Alsalem said that "grave violations of international human rights and humanitarian law" had been committed in Gaza by Israeli troops. In a formal statement alongside the UN Special Rapporteur on the occupied Palestinian territories, she described "credible" allegations of "multiple forms of sexual assault", such as rape and strip-searches, against Palestinian women and girls. Israel denied the allegations.

In August 2025, in an interview with The New Arab, Alsalem accused Israel of targeting Palestinian women and girls in Gaza, stating, "What is happening to Palestinian women and girls is the intentional destruction of their existence and bodies, for being Palestinian and for being women." She also called what is happening in Gaza as a "femi-genocide".

=== Other topics ===
In August 2021, Alsalem emphasised that any Afghanistan party that say they follow Sharia must uphold and protect the rights of women and girls. She wrote that the Taliban are denying individual freedom of thought, conscience, and religion when they impose their beliefs on the Afghan public.

In September 2021, Alsalem criticised the United States Supreme Court after it refused to enjoin the Texas Heartbeat Act and accused its majority of exposing women to potential violence. She said that women from vulnerable groups would bear the brunt of the crackdown against abortion.

In 2022, Alsalem reported that Indigenous women and girls face "violence that permeate every aspect of their lives while perpetrators enjoy alarming levels of impunity". This violence is a manifestation of ongoing inequality that positions Indigenous women and girls as expendable and dispensable. Indigenous women who advocate for human, environmental, or land rights are particularly targeted to stop their activism. They experience systemic discrimination in attempting to access justice in both Indigenous and non-Indigenous justice systems. These barriers reinforce Indigenous women's fear and mistrust in the justice system.

In February 2024, Alsalem criticised the UK's strategies for combating violence against women and girls. She said: "Entrenched patriarchy at almost every level of society, combined with a rise in misogyny that permeates the physical and online world, is denying thousands of women and girls across the UK the right to live in safety, free from fear and violence."

In October 2025, Alsalem called for a ban on surrogacy, comparing the practice to prostitution. Her UN report stated that little of the profits go to the mothers who bear the physical and emotional risks of surrogacy. Jackie Leach Sully, a professor of bioethics at University of South Wales, wrote that the report failed to acknowledge that "surrogacy is a differentiated range of practices with highly variable and nuanced consequences and outcomes" but "it is equally incontestable that there are places and circumstances where reproductive surrogacy is a form of violence towards women, their capacity for reproduction, their bodies, and their rights".
