= Hate Crime and Public Order (Scotland) Act 2021 =

Scottish legislation

- Act of the Scottish Parliament
- Scottish Parliament
- Long title: An Act of the Scottish Parliament to make provision about the aggravation of offences by prejudice; to make provision about an offence of racially aggravated harassment; to make provision about offences relating to stirring up hatred against a group of persons; to abolish the common law offence of blasphemy; and for connected purposes.
- Citation: 2021 asp 14
- Territorial extent: Scotland

Dates
- Royal assent: 23 April 2021
- Commencement: 1 April 2024

Other legislation
- Repeals/revokes: Offences (Aggravation by Prejudice) (Scotland) Act 2009; Common law offence of blasphemy

Status: Current legislation

History of passage through the Parliament

Text of statute as originally enacted

Text of the Hate Crime and Public Order (Scotland) Act 2021 as in force today (including any amendments) within the United Kingdom, from legislation.gov.uk.

The Hate Crime and Public Order (Scotland) Act 2021 (asp 14) is an act of the Scottish Parliament.

== Background ==
The Hate Crime and Public Order (Scotland) Bill was introduced to the Scottish Parliament in April 2020, following an independent review of Scotland's hate crime legislation carried out by Lord Bracadale, which recommended consolidation of all hate crime law into one bill. The bill was controversial, with opponents saying it could stifle freedom of speech. One concern was the potential for the act to be used to prosecute author J. K. Rowling for "expressing her concerns about the impact of trans rights on women". The Scottish Police Federation and the Law Society of Scotland expressed concerns over the threat the bill posed to freedom of expression.

The final vote on the bill was delayed by a day after a number of amendments were proposed. The bill passed on 11 March 2021, with 82 votes in favour, 32 votes against, and 4 abstentions. The act came into force on 1 April 2024.

== Act ==
The legislation broadens the scope of the existing offence of stirring up hatred. Since the Public Order Act 1986, this offence has applied to racial hatred. The act extends the scope to the following characteristics: age, disability, religion, sexual orientation, transgender identity and variations in sex characteristics sometimes known as being intersex.

In England, the Racial and Religious Hatred Act 2006 extended the offence to religion and the Criminal Justice and Immigration Act 2008 extended it to sexual orientation.

The act abolishes the offence of blasphemy, which had not been prosecuted in Scotland for more than 175 years.

== Reaction ==
The bill had received much criticism even before its passage.

The Scottish Police Federation commented on the bill:

We are firmly of the view this proposed legislation would see officers policing speech and would devastate the legitimacy of the police in the eyes of the public. That can never be an acceptable outcome – and we should never forget that the police in Scotland police only with the consent of the people. Police officers are all too aware that there are individuals in society who believe that to feel insulted or offended is a police matter. The Bill would move even further from policing and criminalising of deeds and acts to the potential policing of what people think or feel, as well as the criminalisation of what is said in private.

Upon implementation on 1 April 2024, the act was met with criticism from high-profile celebrities such as J. K. Rowling and Elon Musk. Both are concerned over its impact on freedom of speech. The Scottish Police Federation expected numerous complaints over social media.

Opponents of the act have claimed Scottish First Minister Humza Yousaf, who introduced the law to the Scottish Parliament, violated the act himself when he made an "anti-white" speech before the Scottish Parliament in 2020. Police Scotland received more than 1,000 reports about Yousaf in the first week the act was in effect, but said in a statement that no violation of the act had occurred. Police Scotland were required to record the speech as a "non-criminal hate incident", however, in which Yousaf would be named. In a HARDTalk interview, Yousaf claimed "I've not seen anybody who's described [the speech] that way that isn't, frankly, part of the far-right". Siobhian Brown said: "I think there has been a lot of misinformation" surrounding the policies of the act.

On the first day the law came into force, author J. K. Rowling posted a series of tweets about ten high-profile trans women, including convicted double rapist Isla Bryson, Andrew Miller, a trans woman who abducted a young girl in the Scottish Borders while "dressed as a woman", Mridul Wadhwa, of the Edinburgh Rape Crisis Centre and Katie Dolatowski, "a trans paedophile who sexually assaulted a 10-year-old girl in the toilet" of a supermarket in Kirkcaldy, Fife. Her final post said, "🎉🌼🌸April Fools! 🌸🌼🎉 Only kidding. Obviously, the people mentioned in the above tweets aren't women at all, but men, every last one of them." She followed this with her concerns about the act, saying, "It is impossible to accurately describe or tackle the reality of violence and sexual violence committed against women and girls, or address the current assault on women's and girls' rights, unless we are allowed to call a man a man." She concluded by saying, "I'm currently out of the country, but if what I've written here qualifies as an offence under the terms of the new act, I look forward to being arrested when I return to the birthplace of the Scottish Enlightenment." Prime Minister Rishi Sunak defended Rowling, saying, "People should not be criminalised for stating simple facts on biology."

On 2 April 2024, Police Scotland said Rowling's comments on social media "were not criminal and the force will not be taking action." Police Scotland logged more than 3,000 complaints in the first 48 hours of the hate crime law coming into force, saying they would investigate every report made under the law. Roddy Dunlop KC, dean of the Faculty of Advocates, explained that "the bar for prosecution, let alone conviction, is high — and I doubt we will see many of either. The problem is more likely to lie in the police being swamped with reports, and what happens in terms of recording" The law will force police to make cuts as staff work overtime to deal with the volume of complaints with the chairman of the Scottish Police Federation saying: "At some point in the next financial year, the police service will not do something because of the demand that it's being placed under now."

Supporters of the act maintain the legislation has safeguards to protect freedom of speech. It is also the first act to list age as a characteristic. Age Scotland said "it's going to be a positive thing for the country". However, other aspects have attracted criticism. For Women Scotland opposed the act's stance on gender identity. Some members of the transgender community have, on the other hand, stated that the laws are not harsh enough on transphobia.

Despite the opposition, the Scottish National Party have reiterated their support for the act. Humza Yousaf defended the act by saying it "absolutely protects people in their freedom of expression" while guarding "people from a rising tide of hatred that we've seen far too often in our society". The act also received support from MSPs from Scottish Labour and the Scottish Liberal Democrats. Police Scotland have also pledged to investigate every hate crime complaint they receive. Historically, police forces across the United Kingdom have attracted scrutiny for the way in which they record hate crimes where no charges are brought.

There are fears that the legislation will lead to a strict enforcement of self-censorship. Several feminist groups have argued the absence of sex as a characteristic leaves women vulnerable to hate crimes.
