= Beira's Place =

Scottish sexual violence support service

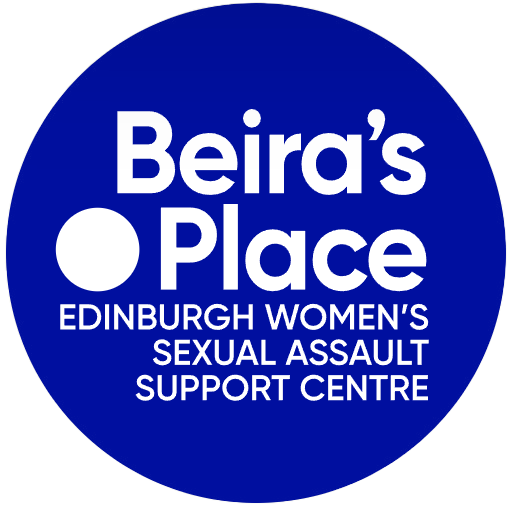
- Formation: 2022; 4 years ago
- Founder: J. K. Rowling
- Legal status: Company
- Purpose: Sexual violence support
- Headquarters: Edinburgh, Scotland
- Chief executive officer: Lesley Johnston
- Website: beirasplace.org.uk

Beira's Place (/ˈbaɪrə/ BY-rə) is a Scotland-based private support service for victims of sexual violence. Founded in 2022 by J. K. Rowling, the organisation describes itself as a "women-only service", and does not hire or provide services to transgender women.

== History ==
Beira's Place is a privately owned and operated domestic violence service that was formed to provide support to women (not including trans women) aged 16 and over in Edinburgh and the Lothians who are survivors of sexual violence.

The organisation was established in December 2022 by British author and philanthropist J. K. Rowling as its founder and financial backer, with the express goal of providing "women-centred and women-delivered care", which Rowling described as an "unmet need". The organisation was named for Beira, the Scottish goddess of winter who represents "female wisdom, power, and regeneration".

Rowling said the impetus to set up the centre was her "fury" on hearing that the then head of the Edinburgh Rape Crisis Centre, a trans woman, said that victims of sexual abuse who requested female-only (exclusionary of trans women) care would be challenged on their prejudices and should "reframe" their trauma. In a statement provided by the organisation, Beira's Place wrote "we believe that women deserve to have certainty that, in using our services, they will not encounter anyone who is male. Where appropriate, we will refer men or individuals identifying as trans women to other appropriate services."

After the founding of Beira's Place, several public figures and organisations expressed their support for the service, while some criticised its exclusion of transgender people; it has been described by LGBTQ+ outlets including The Advocate, PinkNews, and LGBTQ Nation as a trans-exclusionary service. Rape Crisis Scotland publicly welcomed the establishment of "any new service" in light of existing services' underfunding and long waiting lists, while emphasizing the importance of serving trans and non-binary people and noting that rape crisis centres in Scotland had done so for years without incident. UN Special Rapporteur on Violence Against Women Reem Alsalem welcomed the new service, stating "the prevention and response to violence against women requires an all-society approach, so it is great to see different actors who have the means, including private individuals, play their part."

Police Scotland announced in June 2023 that they would create a direct referral procedure for assault survivors to Beira's Place, similar to the existing referral process for Rape Crisis Scotland.

Financial documents from the UK's Companies House revealed that Rowling had provided an interest-free loan of at least £1.9 million, secured against the organisation's Edinburgh property, to help establish and fund Beira's Place. Rowling was separately meeting the centre's "substantial" running costs. As of November 2023, the centre employed 10 staff.

In September 2024, an independent review of the Edinburgh Rape Crisis Centre found that it had failed to protect women only spaces, and recommended that "[c]onsideration should be given to making links with Beira’s Place (a centre which is run by women for women) and adding it to the list of 'by and for' organisations." In November 2024, in the conclusion of the employment tribunal for the Edinburgh Rape Crisis Centre‘s constructively dismissed worker Roz Adams, a judge ordered that the Centre start referring survivors of sexual assault to Beira’s Place, where Adams was subsequently employed.

== Structure ==
The group's founding came shortly before a vote on the Gender Recognition Reform bill. Single-sex services in Scotland, and whether or not trans people should be included in them, are associated with the bill. Beira's Place is not a registered charity of Scotland. As such, it does not accept donations and is funded by Rowling. Alongside Rowling, the board members of the organisation are Rhona Hotchkiss (a former prison governor), Johann Lamont, Susan Smith (director of For Women Scotland), and Margaret McCartney. All board members have been critical of the Scottish Government's proposed reforms to the Gender Recognition Act. Isabelle Kerr, formerly manager of Glasgow and Clyde Rape Crisis Centre, served as the organisation's founding chief executive; Lesley Johnston, previously a national gender-based-violence trainer with experience across the NHS, universities, and local and national government, joined the organisation in December 2024 and became chief executive. Interviewed on the anniversary of the service's opening, Kerr said that its phone service had helped almost 2,000 people seeking support, and over 250 survivors of violence had used its safe space.
