= Aileen Christianson =

Scholar of Scottish and women's literature

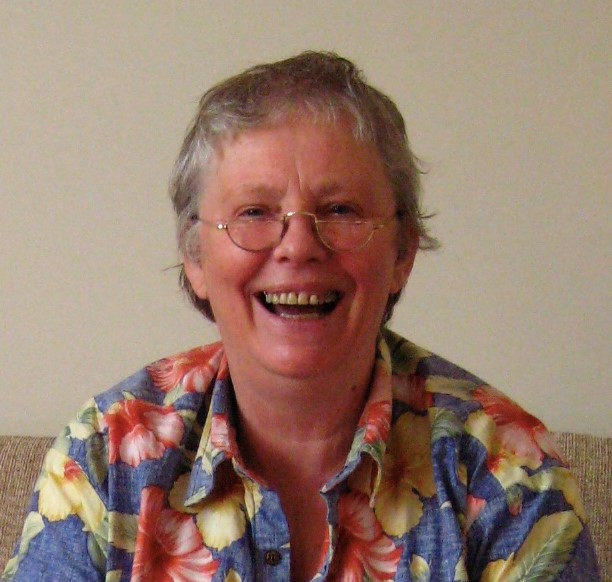
- Born: 8 August 1944; Rhos, Clwyd
- Died: 12 June 2020 (aged 75); Edinburgh
- Known for: Scottish Literature, Scholarly Writings, Women's Literature, Feminist, Campaigner

Aileen Christianson (8 August 1944 – 12 June 2020) was Senior Lecturer in the Department of English Literature at the University of Edinburgh. She was well known as a scholar of Scottish literature and women's writing, and as senior editor of 'The Collected Letters of Thomas and Jane Welsh Carlyle' and of collections of Scottish women's writing. Her experience over decades made her a recognised authority on both Carlyles. She gained an MA (hons.) in English and History from the University of Aberdeen in 1966.

She worked as a researcher and taught as a lecturer and senior lecturer. Her teaching covered mainly nineteenth and twentieth century Scottish women's writing. She published a full-length critical study of the writings of Willa Muir. Aileen was recognised for her outstanding contribution to Scottish Literature and the Arts by the Saltire Society in 2019

She was a long-time supporter of the organisation Rape Crisis Scotland, a network of centres that provide support to campaign and lobby to raise awareness of the issues of sexual violence. Rape Crisis Scotland centres were established in Glasgow in 1976 and in Edinburgh in 1978. Aileen was a member of the Rape Crisis Centre Collective from 1978 to 1996.

She died in Edinburgh on 12 June 2020 from cancer during a period of national lockdown caused by COVID-19.
