= Gender Recognition Reform (Scotland) Bill =

Law blocked by the UK Parliament in 2023

- Bill
- Scottish Parliament
- Long title: An Act of the Scottish Parliament to reform the grounds and procedure for obtaining gender recognition; and for connected purposes.
- Introduced by: Shona Robison
Other legislation
Amends	Gender Recognition Act 2004

Status: Not passed

History of passage through the Parliament

The Gender Recognition Reform (Scotland) Bill is a bill passed by the Scottish Parliament. The bill seeks to amend the Gender Recognition Act 2004 of the Parliament of the United Kingdom, making it simpler for people to change their legal gender. The bill would reduce the minimum age at which a person can apply for a gender recognition certificate from 18 to 16, remove the need for a medical diagnosis and reduce the waiting time from two years to six months of living in an acquired gender. On 17 January 2023, the United Kingdom government used section 35 of the Scotland Act 1998 to block the bill from receiving royal assent, the first time section 35 has been used.

== Background ==
In July 2002, the European Court of Human Rights ruled in the Goodwin v United Kingdom case that a trans person's inability to change the sex on their birth certificate was a breach of their rights under Article 8 (privacy) and Article 12 (marriage) of the European Convention on Human Rights. Following this judgement, the UK government had to introduce new legislation to comply, which became law as the Gender Recognition Act 2004 (GRA). To obtain a gender recognition certificate (GRC) under the GRA, an applicant must a) provide evidence of a diagnosis of gender dysphoria; b) have lived in their "acquired gender" for two years; and c) make a statutory declaration that they intend to live in the acquired gender until death.

In a June 2020 report, the European Commission classified the legal procedures for gender recognition of 28 European countries into five categories based on the barriers to access. This placed the UK's Gender Recognition Act 2004 in the second from bottom category with "intrusive medical requirements" that lag behind international human rights standards. The procedures have also been described as costly, bureaucratic, and time-consuming for trans people, with successful applicants having to wait two years until they can change their legal gender.

The issue of gender recognition is devolved in Scotland, which allows the Scottish parliament, if it wishes, to legislate for a different policy from that of England and Wales. In 2004, the Scottish Parliament passed a motion to consent to Westminster's GRA, so that a uniform system of gender recognition would be in place throughout the UK. A 2018 consultation in England and Wales found that a majority of the over 100,000 respondents were in favour of removing most of the requirements for a GRC; despite this, in 2020, the government in Westminster announced that it would not legislate to relax the requirements. Separately, the Scottish government also consulted on reforming the law: an initial consultation on the principles of the bill which took place between November 2017 and March 2018 found a majority of the 15,500 respondents in favour of the bill; and the second consultation on a draft bill, taking place between November 2019 and March 2020, also found majority support.

== Legislative process ==
=== Draft stage ===
The Scottish National Party (SNP) committed to "review and reform gender recognition law, so it's in line with international best practice for people who are transgender" in their manifesto for the 2016 Scottish Parliament election, which they won. After the consultations ended, the Scottish government intended to introduce the bill to Parliament in 2020, but was forced by the COVID-19 pandemic in Scotland to delay consideration until after the 2021 Scottish Parliament election.

The 2021 election saw the SNP returned to government, this time in a coalition with the Scottish Greens rather than as a minority government; both parties featured the bill in their manifestos. The Bute House Agreement between the two parties committed to introducing a Gender Recognition Reform Bill before the end of May 2022.

=== Stage 1 ===
The bill was introduced on 2 March 2022, by Shona Robison, the Cabinet Secretary for Social Justice, Housing and Local Government. The bill lowers the age people can change their legal gender from 18 to 16, removes the requirement of a medical diagnosis of gender dysphoria, and reduces the waiting time from two years to six months of living in an acquired gender. Also issued on the same day were a delegated powers memorandum, policy memorandum, financial memorandum, and statement of legislative competence.

The bill was subject to a mandatory consultation–its third–by the Scottish Parliament's Equalities, Human Rights and Civil Justice Committee. This committee was designated as the lead committee and ran thirteen evidence sessions. The Delegated Powers and Law Reform Committee of the Scottish Parliament, issued a report to the Equalities, Human Rights and Civil Justice Committee, on 16 May 2022, regarding the delegated powers memorandum for the bill, which reported they were content with the delegated powers provisions contained within the bill. The Finance and Public Administration Committee held a consultation on the financial memorandum, which received six responses, all of which were forwarded to the Equalities, Human Rights and Civil Justice Committee. The committee took no action based on the results of its consultation and recommended no changes to the financial memorandum.

The Stage 1 report, from the Equalities, Human Rights and Civil Justice Committee, recommended that the general principles be approved.

==== Stage 1 vote ====
The bill was voted on by the full parliament on 27 October 2022 and passed by a majority of 88 to 33, with 4 abstentions and 4 members not voting.

Gender Recognition Reform (Scotland) Bill – Stage 1
Party	Votes for	Votes against	Abstained	Did Not Vote
Conservative	2: Sandesh Gulhane; Jamie Greene	26: Alexander Burnett; Alexander Stewart; Annie Wells; Brian Whittle; Craig Hoy; Donald Cameron; Douglas Lumsden; Douglas Ross; Edward Mountain; Finlay Carson; Graham Simpson; Jamie Halcro Johnston; Jeremy Balfour; Liam Kerr; Liz Smith; Maurice Golden; Murdo Fraser; Oliver Mundell; Pam Gosal; Rachael Hamilton; Roz McCall; Russell Findlay; Sharon Dowey; Stephen Kerr; Sue Webber; Tess White	2: Jackson Carlaw; Miles Briggs	1: Meghan Gallacher
Labour	21: Anas Sarwar; Carol Mochan; Claire Baker; Colin Smyth; Daniel Johnson; Foysol Choudhury; Jackie Baillie; Katy Clark; Mark Griffin; Martin Whitfield; Mercedes Villalba; Michael Marra; Monica Lennon; Neil Bibby; Pam Duncan-Glancy; Paul O'Kane; Paul Sweeney; Pauline McNeill; Rhoda Grant; Richard Leonard; Sarah Boyack	–	–	1: Alex Rowley
Liberal Democrats	4: Alex Cole-Hamilton; Beatrice Wishart; Liam McArthur; Willie Rennie	–	–	–
SNP	54: Alasdair Allan; Angela Constance; Angus Robertson; Audrey Nicoll; Ben Macpherson; Bill Kidd; Bob Doris; Christina McKelvie; Christine Grahame; Clare Adamson; Clare Haughey; Colin Beattie; Collette Stevenson; David Torrance; Elena Whitham; Emma Harper; Emma Roddick; Evelyn Tweed; Fiona Hyslop; Fulton MacGregor; George Adam; Gillian Martin; Gordon MacDonald; Graeme Dey; Humza Yousaf; Ivan McKee; Jackie Dunbar; James Dornan; Jamie Hepburn; Jenni Minto; Jenny Gilruth; Joe FitzPatrick; John Swinney; Karen Adam; Kaukab Stewart; Keith Brown; Kevin Stewart; Mairi Gougeon; Màiri McAllan; Maree Todd; Marie McNair; Michael Matheson; Natalie Don; Neil Gray; Nicola Sturgeon; Paul McLennan; Richard Lochhead; Rona Mackay; Shirley-Anne Somerville; Shona Robison; Siobhian Brown; Stuart McMillan; Tom Arthur; Willie Coffey	7: Ash Regan; Fergus Ewing; John Mason; Kenneth Gibson; Michelle Thomson; Ruth Maguire; Stephanie Callaghan	2: Annabelle Ewing; Jim Fairlie	1: Kate Forbes
Green	7: Ariane Burgess; Gillian Mackay; Lorna Slater; Maggie Chapman; Mark Ruskell; Patrick Harvie; Ross Greer	–	–	–
No Party Affiliation (Presiding Officer)	–	–	–	1: Alison Johnstone
Total	88	33	4	4

=== Stage 2 ===
A number of amendments were proposed made to the bill at Stage 2, the majority of which were not passed. The Finance and Public Administration Committee published an updated financial memorandum on 7 December 2022 on the bill and noted the updates at its meeting on 13 December 2022.

=== Stage 3 ===
The bill was heard at Stage 3 on 20–21 December 2022 for amendments to the bill. The final debate and vote was held on 22 December 2022.

==== Equalities, Human Rights and Civil Justice Committee ====
On 19 December 2022, the day before the Stage 3 debate began, the Equalities, Human Rights and Civil Justice Committee held an evidence session on the bill. They heard from two United Nations representatives, Victor Madrigal-Borloz, United Nations Independent Expert on Protection against violence and discrimination based on sexual orientation and gender identity, and Reem Alsalem, United Nations Special Rapporteur on Violence Against Women. Madrigal-Borloz described the Scottish bill as a "significant step forward" that said it would bring Scotland in line with international human rights standards while Alsalem claimed it "would potentially open the door for violent males who identify as men to abuse the process of acquiring a gender certificate and the rights that are associated with it".

==== Stage 3 vote ====
The bill was voted on by the full parliament on 22 December 2022 and passed by a majority of 86 to 39, with 0 abstentions and 4 members not voting. The announcement of the result was accompanied by cheers from supporters in the chamber, and shouts from protesters opposing the bill in the public gallery.

Gender Recognition Reform (Scotland) Bill – Stage 3
Party	Votes for	Votes against	Abstained	Did Not Vote
Conservative	3: Jackson Carlaw; Jamie Greene; Sandesh Gulhane	28: Alexander Burnett; Alexander Stewart; Annie Wells; Brian Whittle; Craig Hoy; Donald Cameron; Douglas Lumsden; Douglas Ross; Edward Mountain; Finlay Carson; Graham Simpson; Jamie Halcro Johnston; Jeremy Balfour; Liam Kerr; Liz Smith; Maurice Golden; Meghan Gallacher; Miles Briggs; Murdo Fraser; Oliver Mundell; Pam Gosal; Rachael Hamilton; Roz McCall; Russell Findlay; Sharon Dowey; Stephen Kerr; Sue Webber; Tess White	–	–
Labour	18: Alex Rowley; Anas Sarwar; Colin Smyth; Daniel Johnson; Foysol Choudhury; Jackie Baillie; Katy Clark; Mark Griffin; Martin Whitfield; Mercedes Villalba; Monica Lennon; Neil Bibby; Pam Duncan-Glancy; Paul O'Kane; Paul Sweeney; Rhoda Grant; Richard Leonard; Sarah Boyack	2: Carol Mochan; Claire Baker	–	2: Michael Marra; Pauline McNeill
Liberal Democrats	4: Alex Cole-Hamilton; Beatrice Wishart; Liam McArthur; Willie Rennie	–	–	–
SNP	54: Alasdair Allan; Angela Constance; Angus Robertson; Audrey Nicoll; Ben Macpherson; Bill Kidd; Bob Doris; Christina McKelvie; Christine Grahame; Clare Adamson; Clare Haughey; Colin Beattie; Collette Stevenson; David Torrance; Elena Whitham; Emma Harper; Emma Roddick; Evelyn Tweed; Fiona Hyslop; Fulton MacGregor; George Adam; Gillian Martin; Gordon MacDonald; Graeme Dey; Humza Yousaf; Ivan McKee; Jackie Dunbar; James Dornan; Jamie Hepburn; Jenni Minto; Jenny Gilruth; Joe FitzPatrick; John Swinney; Karen Adam; Kaukab Stewart; Keith Brown; Kevin Stewart; Mairi Gougeon; Màiri McAllan; Maree Todd; Marie McNair; Michael Matheson; Natalie Don; Neil Gray; Nicola Sturgeon; Paul McLennan; Richard Lochhead; Rona Mackay; Shirley-Anne Somerville; Shona Robison; Siobhian Brown; Stuart McMillan; Tom Arthur; Willie Coffey	9: Annabelle Ewing; Ash Regan; Fergus Ewing; Jim Fairlie; John Mason; Kenneth Gibson; Michelle Thomson; Ruth Maguire; Stephanie Callaghan	–	1: Kate Forbes
Green	7: Ariane Burgess; Gillian Mackay; Lorna Slater; Maggie Chapman; Mark Ruskell; Patrick Harvie; Ross Greer	–	–	–
No Party Affiliation (Presiding Officer)	–	–	–	1: Alison Johnstone
Total	86	39	0	4

=== Veto by UK Government ===
Gender Recognition Reform (Scotland) Bill (Prohibition on Submission for Royal Assent) Order 2023
- Statutory Instrument
- Parliament of the United Kingdom
- Citation: SI 2023/41
- Introduced by: Alister Jack, Secretary of State for Scotland

Dates
- Made: 17 January 2023
- Laid before Parliament: 17 January 2023
- Commencement: 18 January 2023
Other legislation
Made under	Scotland Act 1998

Status: Current legislation

History of passage through Parliament

Text of statute as originally enacted

On 16 January 2023, Scotland Secretary Alister Jack announced that he would make an order under section 35(1)(b) of the Scotland Act 1998, which would prevent the bill from proceeding to royal assent. Jack cited concerns that the bill would adversely impact the UK-wide Gender Recognition Act 2004 and Equality Act 2010 as the reason for the tabling of the motion before the Westminster Parliament; equal opportunities are a reserved matter under the Scotland Act. The order using the negative procedure was made on 17 January 2023 and entered into force on the next day. The negative procedure means that the order is in force unless either house of Parliament votes to disagree with the order within 40 days. The final day to vote a disagreement was 27 February 2023. This was the first time royal assent was not granted to a bill passed by the Scottish Parliament since its creation in 1999. As similar powers regarding the Senedd and Northern Ireland Assembly have never been used, this is the first post-legislative veto of a bill since Queen Anne refused assent to the Scottish Militia Bill in 1708.

On 17 January 2023, Jack made a formal statement to the House of Commons that he was using section 35 of the Scotland Act 1988 and set out his reasons for doing so. On 18 January the statement of Jack that was made in the Commons was presented and debated in the House of Lords.

On 17 January 2023, Stephen Flynn, the SNP leader at Westminster, requested and was granted an emergency debate on the use of the Section 35 order. The debate was on the question "This House has considered the Government's decision to use section 35 of the Scotland Act 1998 with regard to the Gender Recognition Reform (Scotland) Bill." The debate lasted for two hours and the house voted 318 to 71 in favour of the UK government position that the house had considered the matter.

Section 35 of the Scotland Act – Use of Powers Considered
Party	Votes for	Votes against	Did Not Vote
Alba	–	1: Neale Hanvey	1: Kenny MacAskill
Alliance	–	1: Stephen Farry	–
Conservative	313 (+2 tellers): Aaron Bell; Adam Afriyie; Adam Holloway; Alberto Costa; Alec Shelbrooke; Alex Burghart; Alex Chalk; Alexander Stafford; Alicia Kearns; Alok Sharma; Alun Cairns; Amanda Milling; Amanda Solloway; Andrea Leadsom; Andrew Bowie; Andrew Griffith; Andrew Jones; Andrew Lewer; Andrew Mitchell; Andrew Murrison; Andrew Percy; Andrew Selous; Andrew Stephenson; Andy Carter; Angela Richardson; Anna Firth; Anne Marie Morris; Anthony Browne; Anthony Mangnall; Antony Higginbotham; Ben Bradley; Ben Everitt; Ben Spencer; Bernard Jenkin; Bill Wiggin; Bim Afolami; Bob Blackman; Brandon Lewis; Brendan Clarke-Smith; Caroline Ansell; Caroline Dinenage; Caroline Johnson; Charles Walker; Cherilyn Mackrory; Chloe Smith; Chris Clarkson; Chris Green; Chris Loder; Chris Philp; Chris Skidmore; Christopher Chope; Claire Coutinho; Conor Burns; Craig Mackinlay; Craig Tracey; Craig Whittaker; Craig Williams; Crispin Blunt; Damian Collins; Damian Green; Damian Hinds; Damien Moore; Dan Poulter; Daniel Kawczynski; Danny Kruger; Darren Henry; David Davis; David Duguid; David Evennett; David Johnston; David Jones; David Morris; David Mundell; David T C Davies; Dean Russell; Dehenna Davison; Derek Thomas; Desmond Swayne; Dominic Raab; Douglas Ross; Duncan Baker; Eddie Hughes; Edward Argar; Edward Timpson; Elizabeth Truss; Esther McVey; Fay Jones; Felicity Buchan; Fiona Bruce; Flick Drummond; Gagan Mohindra; Gareth Bacon; Gareth Davies; Gareth Johnson; Gary Sambrook; Gary Streeter; Gavin Williamson; Geoffrey Clifton-Brown; Geoffrey Cox; George Eustice; George Freeman; Giles Watling; Gillian Keegan; Gordon Henderson; Graham Brady; Graham Stuart; Grant Shapps; Greg Clark; Greg Hands; Greg Knight; Greg Smith; Guy Opperman; Harriett Baldwin; Heather Wheeler; Helen Grant; Helen Whately; Henry Smith; Holly Mumby-Croft; Huw Merriman; Iain Duncan Smith; Iain Stewart; Ian Liddell-Grainger; Jack Brereton; Jack Lopresti; Jackie Doyle-Price; Jacob Rees-Mogg; Jacob Young; Jake Berry; James Cartlidge; James Daly; James Davies; James Duddridge; James Gray; James Grundy; James Heappey; James Morris; James Sunderland; James Wild; Jane Hunt; Jane Stevenson; Jason McCartney; Jeremy Quin; Jeremy Wright; Jerome Mayhew; Jesse Norman; Jill Mortimer; Jo Churchill; Jo Gideon; John Baron; John Glen; John Hayes; John Howell; John Lamont; John Penrose; John Redwood; John Stevenson; John Whittingdale; Johnny Mercer; Jonathan Djanogly; Jonathan Gullis; Jonathan Lord; Julia Lopez; Julian Lewis; Julian Smith; Julian Sturdy; Julie Marson; Justin Tomlinson; Karl McCartney; Kate Kniveton; Katherine Fletcher; Kelly Tolhurst; Kevin Foster; Kevin Hollinrake; Kieran Mullan; Kwasi Kwarteng; Laura Farris; Laura Trott; Laurence Robertson; Lee Anderson; Lee Rowley; Leo Docherty; Lia Nici; Liam Fox; Louie French; Lucy Allan; Lucy Frazer; Luke Evans; Luke Hall; Maggie Throup; Marco Longhi; Marcus Fysh; Marcus Jones; Maria Caulfield; Mark Eastwood; Mark Fletcher; Mark Francois; Mark Garnier; Mark Harper; Mark Jenkinson; Mark Logan; Mark Pawsey; Mark Pritchard; Mark Spencer; Martin Vickers; Mary Robinson; Matt Vickers; Matt Warman; Matthew Offord; Michael Ellis; Michael Fabricant; Michael Gove; Michael Tomlinson; Michelle Donelan; Mike Freer; Mike Penning; Mike Wood (Teller); Mims Davies; Miriam Cates; Nadhim Zahawi; Natalie Elphicke; Neil Hudson; Neil O'Brien; Nick Fletcher; Nick Gibb; Nickie Aiken; Nigel Adams; Nigel Huddleston; Nigel Mills; Nusrat Ghani; Oliver Dowden; Paul Beresford; Paul Bristow; Paul Holmes; Paul Howell; Paul Maynard; Paul Scully; Pauline Latham; Penny Mordaunt; Peter Aldous; Peter Bone; Peter Bottomley; Peter Gibson; Philip Davies; Philip Dunne; Philip Hollobone; Priti Patel; Rachel Maclean; Ranil Jayawardena; Rebecca Harris; Rebecca Pow; Rehman Chishti; Richard Bacon; Richard Drax; Richard Fuller; Richard Graham; Richard Holden; Rob Butler; Robbie Moore; Robert Courts; Robert Halfon; Robert Largan; Robert Neill; Robert Syms; Robin Millar; Robin Walker; Royston Smith; Ruth Edwards; Sajid Javid; Sally-Ann Hart; Saqib Bhatti; Sara Britcliffe; Sarah Atherton; Sarah Dines; Scott Benton; Scott Mann; Selaine Saxby; Shaun Bailey; Sheryll Murray; Simon Baynes; Simon Clarke; Simon Fell; Simon Hart; Simon Jupp; Siobhan Baillie; Stephen Hammond; Stephen McPartland; Stephen Metcalfe; Steve Baker; Steve Barclay; Steve Brine; Steve Double; Stuart Anderson (Teller); Stuart Andrew; Suzanne Webb; Theo Clarke; Theresa Villiers; Thérèse Coffey; Tim Loughton; Tobias Ellwood; Tom Hunt; Tom Pursglove; Tom Randall; Tom Tugendhat; Tracey Crouch; Trudy Harrison; Vicky Ford; Victoria Atkins; Victoria Prentis; Virginia Crosbie; Wendy Morton; Will Quince; William Cash; William Wragg	–	40: Alan Mak; Alister Jack; Andrea Jenkyns; Andrew Rosindell; Anne-Marie Trevelyan; Ben Wallace; Bob Seely; Bob Stewart; Boris Johnson; Caroline Nokes; Chris Grayling; Chris Heaton-Harris; David Rutley; David Simmonds; Edward Leigh; Elliot Colburn; Ian Levy; James Cleverly; Jamie Wallis; Jeremy Hunt; Joy Morrissey; Karen Bradley; Kemi Badenoch; Kit Malthouse; Maria Miller; Mark Menzies; Mel Stride; Nadine Dorries; Nicola Richards; Oliver Heald; Rishi Sunak; Robert Buckland; Robert Goodwill; Robert Jenrick; Roger Gale; Shailesh Vara; Simon Hoare; Stephen Crabb; Suella Braverman; Theresa May
DUP	6: Gavin Robinson; Gregory Campbell; Jeffrey Donaldson; Jim Shannon; Paul Girvan; Sammy Wilson	–	2: Carla Lockhart; Ian Paisley Jr
Green	–	1: Caroline Lucas	–
Labour	–	11: Bell Ribeiro-Addy; Ben Bradshaw; Beth Winter; Charlotte Nichols; John McDonnell; Kate Osborne; Lloyd Russell-Moyle; Nadia Whittome; Olivia Blake; Richard Burgon; Zarah Sultana	183: Abena Oppong-Asare; Afzal Khan; Alan Campbell; Alan Whitehead; Alex Cunningham; Alex Davies-Jones; Alex Norris; Alex Sobel; Alison McGovern; Andrew Gwynne; Andrew Western; Andy McDonald; Andy Slaughter; Angela Eagle; Angela Rayner; Anna McMorrin; Anneliese Dodds; Apsana Begum; Bambos Charalambous; Barbara Keeley; Barry Gardiner; Barry Sheerman; Bill Esterson; Bridget Phillipson; Carolyn Harris; Cat Smith; Catherine McKinnell; Catherine West; Chi Onwurah; Chris Bryant; Chris Elmore; Chris Evans; Christian Wakeford; Clive Betts; Clive Efford; Clive Lewis; Colleen Fletcher; Dan Carden; Dan Jarvis; Daniel Zeichner; Darren Jones; David Lammy; Dawn Butler; Debbie Abrahams; Derek Twigg; Diana Johnson; Diane Abbott; Edward Miliband; Ellie Reeves; Emily Thornberry; Emma Hardy; Emma Lewell-Buck; Fabian Hamilton; Feryal Clark; Fleur Anderson; Florence Eshalomi; Gareth Thomas; George Howarth; Geraint Davies; Gerald Jones; Gill Furniss; Graham Stringer; Grahame Morris; Harriet Harman; Helen Hayes; Hilary Benn; Holly Lynch; Ian Byrne; Ian Lavery; Ian Mearns; Ian Murray; Imran Hussain; James Murray; Janet Daby; Jeff Smith; Jess Phillips; Jessica Morden; Jim McMahon; Jo Stevens; John Cryer; John Healey; John Spellar; Jon Cruddas; Jon Trickett; Jonathan Ashworth; Jonathan Reynolds; Judith Cummins; Julie Elliott; Justin Madders; Karen Buck; Karin Smyth; Karl Turner; Kate Hollern; Kate Osamor; Keir Starmer; Kerry McCarthy; Kevan Jones; Kevin Brennan; Khalid Mahmood; Kim Johnson; Kim Leadbeater; Liam Byrne; Lilian Greenwood; Lisa Nandy; Liz Kendall; Liz Twist; Louise Haigh; Lucy Powell; Luke Pollard; Lyn Brown; Margaret Beckett; Margaret Greenwood; Margaret Hodge; Maria Eagle; Marie Rimmer; Mark Hendrick; Mark Tami; Marsha De Cordova; Mary Glindon; Mary Kelly Foy; Matt Rodda; Matt Western; Matthew Pennycook; Meg Hillier; Mick Whitley; Mike Amesbury; Mike Kane; Mohammad Yasin; Navendu Mishra; Naz Shah; Nia Griffith; Nick Smith; Nick Thomas-Symonds; Pat McFadden; Paul Blomfield; Paula Barker; Paulette Hamilton; Peter Dowd; Peter Kyle; Preet Kaur Gill; Rachael Maskell; Rachel Hopkins; Rachel Reeves; Rebecca Long-Bailey; Rosena Allin-Khan; Rosie Duffield; Rushanara Ali; Ruth Cadbury; Ruth Jones; Sam Tarry; Samantha Dixon; Sarah Champion; Sarah Jones; Sarah Owen; Seema Malhotra; Shabana Mahmood; Sharon Hodgson; Simon Lightwood; Siobhain McDonagh; Stella Creasy; Stephanie Peacock; Stephen Doughty; Stephen Kinnock; Stephen Morgan; Stephen Timms; Steve McCabe; Steve Reed; Tahir Ali; Taiwo Owatemi; Tanmanjeet Singh Dhesi; Thangam Debbonaire; Toby Perkins; Tonia Antoniazzi; Tony Lloyd; Tulip Siddiq; Valerie Vaz; Vicky Foxcroft; Virendra Sharma; Wayne David; Wes Streeting; Yasmin Qureshi; Yvette Cooper; Yvonne Fovargue
Liberal Democrats	–	11: Alistair Carmichael; Christine Jardine; Daisy Cooper; Helen Morgan; Jamie Stone; Munira Wilson; Richard Foord; Sarah Green; Sarah Olney; Tim Farron; Wendy Chamberlain	3: Ed Davey; Layla Moran; Wera Hobhouse
Plaid Cymru	–	2: Ben Lake; Liz Saville Roberts	1: Hywel Williams
SNP	–	42 (+2 tellers): Alan Brown; Alison Thewliss; Allan Dorans; Alyn Smith; Amy Callaghan; Angela Crawley; Anne McLaughlin; Anum Qaisar; Brendan O'Hara; Carol Monaghan; Chris Law; Chris Stephens; Dave Doogan; David Linden; Deidre Brock; Douglas Chapman; Drew Hendry; Gavin Newlands; Hannah Bardell; Ian Blackford; John McNally; John Nicolson; Kirsten Oswald; Kirsty Blackman; Lisa Cameron; Marion Fellows; Martin Docherty-Hughes; Martyn Day; Mhairi Black; Owen Thompson; Patricia Gibson; Patrick Grady; Pete Wishart; Peter Grant (Teller); Philippa Whitford; Ronnie Cowan; Stephen Flynn; Steven Bonnar (Teller); Stewart Hosie; Stewart McDonald; Stuart C McDonald; Tommy Sheppard	3: Angus Brendan MacNeil; Joanna Cherry; Richard Thomson
SDLP	–	1: Colum Eastwood	1: Claire Hanna
Independent	1: Rob Roberts	3: Claudia Webbe; Jonathan Edwards; Margaret Ferrier	11: Andrew Bridgen; Christina Rees; Christopher Pincher; Conor McGinn; David Warburton; Jeremy Corbyn; Julian Knight; Matt Hancock; Neil Coyle; Nick Brown; Rupa Huq
Speaker and deputies	–	–	4: Lindsay Hoyle (Speaker); Eleanor Laing; Nigel Evans; Rosie Winterton
Total	318 (+2 tellers)	71 (+2 tellers)	249
Seats not taken
Sinn Féin	7: Chris Hazzard; Francie Molloy; John Finucane; Michelle Gildernew; Mickey Brady; Órfhlaith Begley; Paul Maskey		
Seats vacant
Vacant	1: West Lancashire		

On 24 January 2023, Flynn tabled a Prayer against the section 35 Order which was worded as follows: "That a humble Address be presented to His Majesty, praying that The Gender Recognition Reform (Scotland) Bill (Prohibition on Submission for Royal Assent) Order 2023, dated 17 January 2023, a copy of which was laid before this House on 17 January 2023, be annulled".

== Judicial process ==
=== Judicial review ===
On 12 April 2023, Cabinet Secretary for Social Justice in the devolved Scottish government, Shirley-Anne Somerville, announced the intention to launch a request for a judicial review of the UK government's use of Section 35 of the Scotland Act 1998 against the bill. The hearing of the court case began on 19 September 2023 at the Court of Session in Edinburgh and was completed the following day. The court's ruling was delivered on 8 December 2023; the judge rejected the Scottish Government's legal challenge. In his analysis for The Herald, the newspaper's political editor, Tom Gordon, wrote of the ruling, "Make no mistake. This is not a narrow defeat for the Scottish Government and Mr Yousaf's decision to go to court come-what-may. It is a comprehensive demolition job".

On 20 December 2023, Somerville announced that the Scottish government would not appeal the ruling, but would not withdraw the bill from the Scottish parliament. She said: "For the avoidance of doubt, this bill is not in the bin and is waiting an incoming UK government that has more respect for devolution."

On 10 May 2024, First Minister and SNP Leader, John Swinney, formally abandoned Nicola Sturgeon's self-ID gender plans after saying they cannot be implemented. He told Sky News that "The reality of the situation we face is that the Supreme Court has said that we can't legislate in that area. We can't take forward that legislation".

== Opinion on the bill ==
=== Support ===
The bill was supported by feminist, LGBTQ, and human rights campaign organisations such as Amnesty International, Stonewall, Rape Crisis Scotland, Equality Network, Engender, Scottish Trans Alliance, and Scottish Women's Aid. The vast majority of SNP and Scottish Labour parliamentarians, as well as all Scottish Green and Scottish Liberal Democrat MSPs supported the bill, as did three of the Scottish Conservative members.

The bill is similar to the one adopted in the Republic of Ireland. In Northern Ireland, the bill was supported by Sinn Féin, the Alliance Party, and the Social Democratic and Labour Party, whose politicians and MPs raised the possibility of adopting a similar bill.

=== Opposition ===
The bill was opposed by some political, social, feminist and religious organisations such as the Scottish Conservatives, the LGB Alliance, Fair Play for Women, the Catholic Bishops' Conference of Scotland and For Women Scotland, a group founded to oppose the bill. Nine SNP members voted against the bill at stage 3, which was reported in Euronews as "the biggest rebellion against the government by its own party in the last 15 years". The Minister for Community Safety, the SNP's Ash Regan, resigned before the Stage 2 vote, saying she was concerned the bill could have "negative implications for the safety and dignity of women and girls". Regan left the party within a year, joining the Alba Party.

== Political opinion ==
Soon after the passage of the bill, academic commentary began to moot the possibility of an invocation of section 35 of the Scotland Act 1998 to block the bill. On 21 December 2022, Michael Foran, a lecturer in public law at the University of Glasgow, floated the idea that the bill could be blocked as it infringed on the operation of reserved matters. On 23 December 2022, Prime Minister Rishi Sunak said that it would be "completely reasonable" for the United Kingdom government to block the bill, citing concerns for "women and children's safety". On 16 January 2023, in response to continued reports that the government was planning to block the bill, Scotland's first minister Nicola Sturgeon called the prospect an "outrage", and stated the UK government was using transgender people as a "political weapon". Following Jack's announcement in the House of Commons of the UK that the bill would be blocked, Sturgeon said that the dispute would "inevitably end up in court" and that the Scottish government would "vigorously defend" the bill.

Kemi Badenoch, the minister for women and equalities, suggested that gender recognition certificates and associated government documents would no longer be recognised in England and Wales if they were from places "where there is a clear indication that the country now no longer has a system at least as rigorous as those in the Gender Recognition Act 2004". On 17 January 2023, the Westminster government released a policy statement on their decision to invoke Section 35. In the statement they set out three primary reasons why they believed the Scottish bill impinged upon reserved matters: firstly, a potential impact on provision of single-sex services authorised under the Equality Act 2010 as a result of creating "two parallel and very different regimes" for issuing gender recognition certificates; secondly, a potential increased risk of fraudulent applications; thirdly, potential impacts on the operation of the Equality Act 2010.

Alister Jack and Kemi Badenoch were invited by the Scottish Parliament's Equalities, Human Rights and Civil Justice Committee to give evidence about their decision to block the bill; both declined to attend.

Lord Hope of Craighead, formerly deputy president of the UK Supreme Court defended the legality of the UK government's decision and said that the possibility of success of a legal challenge against the decision by the Scottish Government was "very low". Former Labour shadow attorney general Baroness Chakrabarti also defended the legality of the government's decision. Former Labour Lord Chancellor Lord Falconer of Thoroton has tweeted that the UK government's reasons are not justified.

Nancy Kelley, the chief executive of Stonewall, and Colin Macfarlane, the director of Stonewall Scotland, said that Sunak was risking "re-toxifying" his government's record on LGBTQ rights and introducing "an effective trans travel ban". Kelley and Macfarlane were quoted as saying "the UK government sees trans people as a threat to be contained, not citizens to be respected". A Cabinet Office spokesperson responded by saying that trans people "have not and will not be banned" from entering the UK. In contrast to Labour Party leader Keir Starmer, who criticised the bill as "cavalier", Scottish Labour leader Anas Sarwar supported the bill. Maggie Baska in PinkNews notes that Starmer "faced backlash from other politicians, LGBTQ+ advocates and trans people over his comments on the GRR bill".

In February 2022 Polling by Savanta of 2068 people found that people were sympathetic towards trans people but were uncertain of hesitant about changes to the act. 67% of people polled said they were not following the debate closely with John Curtice saying that the public was evenly divided and that a lot of people were saying they weren't sure or didn't know on the issues presented. In December 2022 polling by YouGov of 1090 people found that a majority were against some of the main changes to the bill with 66% opposing lowering the age limit from 18 to 16 and 60% opposing the removal of requiring a diagnosis of gender dysphoria.

== See also ==
- Feminist views on transgender topics
- Gender Recognition Act 2004 (U.K.)
- Goodwin v United Kingdom (2002)
- History of transgender people in the United Kingdom
- Legal status of transgender people
- LGBTQ rights in Scotland
- LGBTQ rights in the United Kingdom
- Outline of transgender topics
- Sex Discrimination Act 1984 (Australia)
- Tickle v Giggle (2024)
- Transgender rights in Australia
- Transgender rights in Europe
- Transgender rights in New Zealand
- Transgender rights in the United Kingdom
- Transgender rights in the United States
- Transgender rights movement
- United States v. Skrmetti (605 U.S. 495, 2025)
- For Women Scotland Ltd v The Scottish Ministers (UKSC 16, 2025)
