= Margaret McCartney =

General practitioner, writer and broadcaster

Margaret McCartney FRSE
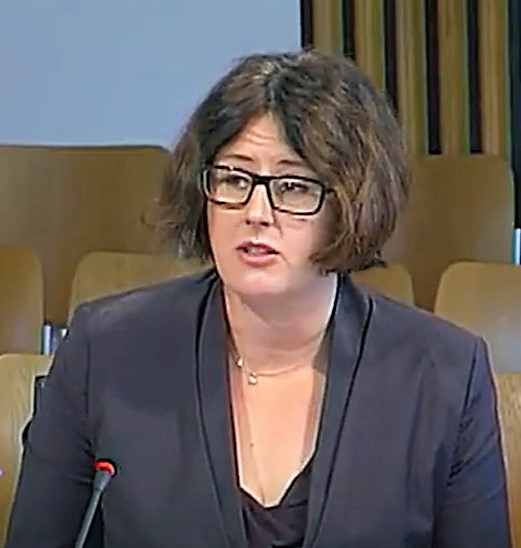
- McCartney speaks to a Scottish Parliament committee in 2017
- Born: Margaret Mary McCartney; Scotland
- Education: University of Aberdeen (MBChB); University of St Andrews (PhD)
- Occupations: GP; writer; broadcaster; lecturer
- Years active: 1995-present
- Employer: NHS Greater Glasgow and Clyde
- Known for: Evidence based medicine
- Children: 3

Margaret Mary McCartney FRSE is a general practitioner, freelance writer, broadcaster and lecturer based in Glasgow, Scotland. McCartney is a vocal advocate for evidence-based medicine. McCartney was a regular columnist at the British Medical Journal. She regularly writes articles for The Guardian and currently contributes to the BBC Radio 4 programme, Inside Health. She has written three popular science books, The Patient Paradox, The State of Medicine and Living with Dying. During the COVID-19 pandemic, McCartney contributed content to academic journals and broadcasting platforms, personal blog, and social media to inform the public and dispel myths about coronavirus disease.

== Early life and education ==
McCartney was born in Scotland, and has said that her earliest ambition was "to be an engineer". She studied medicine at the University of Aberdeen School of Medicine and Dentistry and earned her medical degree in 1994. In 1995, she completed her General Medical Council registration. In 2024, she was awarded her PhD from the University of St Andrews School of Medicine with a thesis titled 'Conflicts of interest in healthcare - where are we now?' under the supervision of Frank Sullivan.

== Career ==
McCartney is a general practitioner based in Glasgow, Scotland, contracted to NHS Greater Glasgow and Clyde. McCartney started popular science writing after reading a misleading newspaper article claiming health benefits associated with CT scanning.

From 2013 to 2018, McCartney wrote regular columns for the British Medical Journal (BMJ), through which she debunked medical claims that were not rooted in evidence.

McCartney is a regular contributor to the BBC Radio 4 programme Inside Health and has contributed to other science-related programming. McCartney uses her time on air to share evidence about topics related to public health, for example the lack of evidence surrounding the sugary drink tax or recommendation to drink eight glasses a day of water. She has written and hosted her own radio shows, including Farewell Doctor Finlay and Tell Me Where It Hurts, which looked at historical and contemporary GP practice in the National Health Service.

Alongside her writing and broadcasting, McCartney has campaigned for doctors to be required to provide conflict of interest statements to their patients. At the time, access to this type of information was becoming increasingly important – the commercialisation of healthcare was resulting in confusing guidelines that did not protect patients. "Conflict of Interest" could include disclosing whether they are a paid consultant for or have been trained by a drug company when prescribing drugs. She argued that as doctors have to disclose this information to their employers each year, the General Medical Council should be able provide this detail to members of the public. Her proposal was backed by Ben Goldacre, Trish Groves and Iain Chalmers. As part of this campaign, McCartney and colleagues set up the website whopaysthisdoctor.org, which collected and shared details on the commercial interests of physicians.

McCartney established the Royal College of General Practitioners working group on overdiagnosis, Cite this as: BMJ 2014;349:g4454 which she defined as "the application of diagnoses and treatments for patients that are of little or no value". As part of her campaigning work, she led calls for general practitioners and pharmacists to not recommend or prescribe homeopathic medicine or products. This was approved by the Royal College of General Practitioners in 2015, who made a statement outlining their commitment to evidence-based medicine.

She has provided evidence before government on the need for healthcare providers in both the public and private sector to be more transparent about the risks and benefits of health screening. She pointed out that private screening companies could make claims such as, "we've saved thousands of lives", in advertising materials, irrespective of whether these claims were grounded in evidence. McCartney has shown that the outcomes of these evidence-free, private screenings, which were not sanctioned by the UK National Screening Committee, often resulted in an additional burden for the National Health Service. McCartney has argued that 'sexed up' medicine; in which people make medical decisions based on overselling, incomplete information and unfair claims, is bad for people's health. As part of her campaigning efforts, she contacted the Advertising Standards Authority, who upheld her complaints on the use of misleading information and non-evidence based inspections. In 2016 McCartney joined Phil Hammond for a month long show at the Edinburgh Festival Fringe, where the pair urged the audience to protect the National Health Service from "market mayhem".

Throughout the COVID-19 pandemic McCartney was a regular guest on Inside Health, discussing the drug trial, health inequality, the impact of smoking on coronavirus disease prognosis and importance of personal protective equipment. In March 2020 she called for more COVID-19 testing of frontline workers, pointing out that over the course of two days, their workload had increased by 40%. Writing in The Lancet, McCartney described the impact of the COVID-19 pandemic on the medical community, "The NHS has told people for years that it 'puts patients at the hearts of all we do'. I suspect most doctors, frustrated at bureaucracy and barriers, would disagree. That it has taken a global crisis, which is killing patients and health-care staff, and which will have profound psychological sequelae, to make this happen, is catastrophic, and an unpayable price".

In 2025, McCartney, Frank Sullivan and others established the Centre for Evidence and Values in Healthcare at the University of St Andrews School of Medicine, with the stated aim of helping people make better decisions in healthcare.

She is a patron of HealthWatch UK, a charity which challenges poor evidence in health reporting, as well as an honorary fellow of the Centre for Evidence-Based Medicine.

She is a member of the advisory group that supports the Patient Safety Commissioner for Scotland.

== Personal life ==
McCartney lives in Glasgow. She has three children.

== Leadership ==
- 2018–2020: Royal College of General Practitioners, Senior fellow for Evidence and Values
- 2020: CSO career research fellow
- 2020: Royal College of General Practitioners, Trustee and council member
- 2022: Beira's Place, Board of Directors member

== Awards and honours ==
- 2008: HealthWatch Award
- 2009: Cancerworld, Best Cancer Reporter Award
- 2016: Pulse Today, Pulse Power 50
- 2016: PPA Columnist of the Year
- 2017: New York Festivals World's Best Radio Programs Finalist
- 2018: Pulse Today, Pulse Power 50
- 2023: elected a fellow of the Royal Society of Edinburgh.

== Selected works and publications ==
=== Selected works ===
- McCartney, Margaret (2012). The Patient Paradox: Why Sexed-Up Medicine Is Bad for Your Health. London: Pinter & Martin. ISBN 978-1-780-66000-4. OCLC 801002449.
- McCartney, Margaret (2014). Living with Dying: Finding Care and Compassion at the End of Life. London: Pinter & Martin. ISBN 978-1-78066-150-6. OCLC 909029817.
- McCartney, Margaret (2016). The State of Medicine: Keeping the Promise of the NHS. London: Pinter and Marti. ISBN 978-1-78066-400-2. OCLC 945947405.

=== Selected publications ===
- McCartney, Margaret (24 November 2006). "Opinion: Lies, damn lies and medical statistics". Financial Times.
- McCartney, Margaret (27 September 2008). "Reality check on breast cancer". Financial Times.
- McCartney, Margaret (17 March 2014). "Margaret McCartney: Singing the praises of evidence". BMJ. 348 (mar17 2) g2015. doi:10.1136/BMJ.G2015. PMID 24637678. S2CID 11923104. Wikidata ()
- McCartney, Margaret (26 March 2018). "Margaret McCartney: Medicine must do better on gender". BMJ. 360 k1312. doi:10.1136/BMJ.K1312. PMID 29581382. Wikidata ()
- McCartney, Margaret (8 May 2018). "Margaret McCartney: A new era of consumerist private GP services". BMJ. 361 k1861. doi:10.1136/BMJ.K1861. PMID 29739769. Wikidata ()
- McCartney, Margaret (31 July 2018). "Margaret McCartney: If you don't pay for it you are the product". BMJ. 362 k3249. doi:10.1136/BMJ.K3249. PMID 30065014. Wikidata ()
- McCartney, Margaret (4 September 2018). "Margaret McCartney: A summary of four and a half years of columns in one column". BMJ. 362 k3745. doi:10.1136/BMJ.K3745. PMID 30181339. Wikidata ()
- McCartney, Margaret; Fell, Greg; Finnikin, Sam; Hunt, Harriet; McHugh, Mike; Gray, Muir (12 December 2019). "Why 'case finding' is bad science". Journal of the Royal Society of Medicine. 113 (2): 54–58. doi:10.1177/0141076819891422. PMC 7068767. PMID 31829072. Wikidata ()
- McCartney, Margaret (24 March 2020). "COVID-19 PPE; Secondary Pneumonia; Viral Load; Trauma Care in Fort William". Inside Health. BBC Radio 4.
- McCartney, Margaret (April 2020). "Medicine: Before COVID-19, and After". The Lancet. 395 (10232): 1248–1249. doi:10.1016/S0140-6736(20)30756-X. PMC 7270612. PMID 32243779. Wikidata ()
- McCartney, Margaret (22 May 2020). "Opinion - Coronavirus outbreak: There are few certainties in coronavirus medicine – research is our best weapon". The Guardian.
