= Rape Crisis Scotland =

Scottish sexual abuse support charity

- Formation: 1976
- Location: Scotland
- Services: Rape crisis centre
- Website: https://www.rapecrisisscotland.org.uk/

Rape Crisis Scotland (RCS) is a charity which provides a national rape crisis helpline and email support for anyone affected by sexual violence, no matter when or how it happened. There are 17 independent local centres in Scotland that are members of RCS.

== Services ==
Contact with centres typically takes place via a variety of methods, predominantly by phone and text. The Rape Crisis Movement began in the 1970s and there are also Rape Crisis centres in England and Wales. The presence of Rape Crisis Centres empowers women to speak out about their experiences of sexual violence.

Rape Crisis Scotland offer the Equally Safe in Higher Education (ESHE) Toolkit training to staff at colleges and universities across Scotland in partnership with their local Rape Crisis Centres, and other Gender-Based Violence organisations.

== History ==
The first two rape crisis centres in Scotland opened in Glasgow in 1976 and in Edinburgh in 1978. The Glasgow Centre claims to be the longest running centre in the UK. They originally relied on volunteers, voluntary contributions small grants, but now attract some funding from the Scottish government.

In 2018-19, 5750 people received support and/or information from 17 rape crisis centres in Scotland – a rise of over 13% from the previous year. 92% of the service users are female survivors of sexual violence. An increase in numbers of women reporting sexual abuse has been reported in the wake of the Me Too movement.

Rape Crisis Scotland gained an additional funding boost and shared £4.5m of Scottish Government funding with Scottish Women's Aid in 2021.

== National context ==
The national context is important for the work of the centres. The Scottish legal verdict of 'not-proven' and different requirements for corroboration are thought to impact disproportionately on rape and sexual assault cases, leading to markedly lower prosecution and conviction rates. Rape Crisis Scotland campaign to end the not proven verdict and to abolish the corroboration requirement. Rape Crisis Scotland are involved with the Scottish Feminist Judgements Project which looks at how legal rulings might have been different had the judge adopted a feminist perspective. Their National Advocacy Project supports people considering reporting sexual violence to the police.

The organisation has strategic partnerships with Police Scotland, The Crown Office & Procurator Fiscal Service, JustRight Scotland and Strathclyde Law Clinic enabling survivors to feedback on their experience of the criminal justice process and inform change. They campaign to raise awareness of the need for services to support victims of rape and lobby the Scottish government to take a broader look at how the legal system serves victims of sexual violence.

The Victims’ Rights (Prescribed Bodies) (Scotland) Order 2010

== Past activists ==
A 2009 book captured a history of the experiences of women who were involved in Rape Crisis in Scotland during its first 15 years of organisation including Aileen Christianson, Lily Greenan and Sheila Gilmore. Many of the women involved in the early Rape Crisis centres had been involved in left-wing politics, but felt disillusioned with the way that issues of gender were sidelined or ignored.

"Some women came in because they were rape survivors…[ ] …Others came in, because intellectually, perhaps, they really wanted to do something, or politically, they wanted to do something, and others came in ‘cause they wanted to change the world.” [Aileen Christianson]

The 2009 book is dedicated to all women who have been involved in the fight against violence against women it tells the story of why and how the Rape Crisis movement emerged in Scotland, what the context was like then, and what it meant to them to be part of this movement.

Statistics published in The Glasgow Herald at the end of 1980 showed that there was growing concern over a conviction rate that stood at around 23% of the number reported – in 1979, when 145 cases were reported (90 of these were in Strathclyde), 50 were proceeded against, and 34 of these resulted in a conviction. It seems horribly ironic that this rate of conviction now seems like a distant ideal – figures for 2006/7 showed that while the figure for reported rapes rocketed in the intervening years to 922, the number of corresponding convictions was a mere 27, giving Scotland at the time of publication almost three decades later one of the lowest conviction rates anywhere – 2.9%.

== Independent centres that are members of Rape Crisis Scotland ==
The following independent centres are members of Rape Crisis Scotland as of 2024.

- Argyll and Bute Rape Crisis
- Dumfries & Galloway RASAC (South West)
- Edinburgh Rape Crisis Centre
- Fife Rape and Sexual Assault Centre
- Glasgow and Clyde Rape Crisis centre (until October 2024)
- Forth Valley Rape Crisis
- Lanarkshire Rape Crisis Centre
- Moray Rape Crisis
- Orkney Rape Crisis
- Rape and Sexual Abuse Centre Perth & Kinross
- Rape and Sexual Abuse Service Highland (RASASH)
- Rape Crisis Grampian
- Scottish Borders Rape Crisis Centre
- Shetland Rape Crisis
- STAR Centre Ayrshire
- Western Isles Rape Crisis Centre
- Women's Rape and Sexual Abuse Centre Dundee and Angus

== Controversies ==
Glasgow and Clyde Rape Crisis centre lost funding in 2018 and was forced to close face to face services after charity funding was withdrawn due to lack of provision for men affected by sexual abuse.

Central Scotland Rape Crisis and Sexual Abuse Centre in Stirling entered liquidation in 2015 after an employment tribunal over the treatment of its staff.

Rape Crisis Scotland 's CEO suggested that the outcome of the ex-First Minister Alex Salmond's 2020 trial might deter rape victims from coming forward.

Edinburgh Rape Crisis Centre attracted controversy in 2024 during a tribunal hearing a constructive dismissal claim from former gender-critical employee, Roz Adams. Rape Crisis Scotland issued a statement saying they were not involved in any of the circumstances leading to the tribunal, and reiterated that all centres must provide dedicated women-only spaces. The statement included references to survivor centres and trauma informed support.

Rape Crisis support services should be survivor centred, trauma informed and meet survivors where their needs are. All Rape Crisis Centres in Scotland are signed up to working within UK-wide national services standards. These set out that every Centre must provide and protect dedicated women only spaces. These standards also require Rape Crisis Centres to ensure that their services are informed by the needs of service users, with each service user being an active partner in the support they receive.

Roz Adams won her case in May 2024. The tribunal found that she had been constructively dismissed in a process by the CEO and management that was described as a "heresy hunt".

In October 2024, Glasgow and Clyde Rape Crisis Centre announced that it was breaking with Rape Crisis Scotland in order to provide “a single-sex service by an all-female workforce“, which it stated it would accomplish by no longer hiring trans women.

== See also ==
- Shakti Women’s Aid
- Scottish Women's Aid
- Rape Crisis England and Wales
- Biera's Place
