= Edinburgh Rape Crisis Centre =

Scottish charity

- Abbreviation: ERCC
- Formation: 1978; 48 years ago
- Type: Charity
- Location: Edinburgh, Scotland
- Region served: Edinburgh, East Lothian and Midlothian
- Website: www.ercc.scot

Edinburgh Rape Crisis Centre (ERCC) is a Scottish charity that provides free, confidential support to survivors of sexual violence in Edinburgh and the Lothian regions. It was the third rape crisis centre established in the United Kingdom, after centres in London and Glasgow, and is a member of the network of crisis centres under Rape Crisis Scotland. The centre opened on 1 July 1978 following two years of planning by women in Edinburgh’s feminist movement, initially operating with 30 volunteers and funded by private donations.

The centre offers emotional and practical support, advocacy through the criminal justice system, and specialist projects for young people, Black and minority ethnic survivors, and students, alongside prevention workshops for 11–25 year olds.

Public education and campaigning on legal reform form an important part of its work, particularly campaigning on Scottish rape law. The organisation resisted external funding until 1987, when the Social Work Committee of Lothian Regional Council began contributing half of its running costs. It hired its first paid worker in 1992. Devolution led to increased funding, and the creation of the Rape Crisis Scotland network, and the formation of national standards for care, published in 2011.

In 2021 the appointment of Mridul Wadhwa as the first Chief Executive Officer proved (CEO) controversial, with protests over her eligibility for the role, and a campaign of harassment that required the centre to increase its security arrangements. A 2024 employment tribunal ruled that ERCC had constructively dismissed a staff member because of her gender-critical beliefs. This led to an independent review of the service that found failures to protect women only spaces and to put survivors first; Rape Crisis Scotland paused referrals to ERCC in September 2024 and Wadhwa resigned.

== History ==
The ERCC opened on 1 July 1978 following approximately two years of planning by women involved in Edinburgh’s feminist movement. It was the third rape crisis centre established in the United Kingdom, after centres in London and Glasgow. The centre provided confidential telephone support, advice and individual support to women who had experienced rape or sexual assault, and was initially operated by 30 women volunteers, and funded through private donations. Although its services were primarily directed towards women, the centre stated that it would not refuse help to men.

The centre’s first premises were in Forth Street, near Picardy Place, Edinburgh. It then moved to the Women's Centre in Broughton Street Lane in 1993. It moved again in 1996 to Leopold Street to accommodate a growing number of volunteers, and then to the current location in Claremont Crescent in 2017.

Public education and legal reform formed an important part of the centre's work. Members gave talks, spoke to journalists, contributed to feminist publications and promoted the service through newspapers, telephone directories, public events and limited advertising. The centre became particularly associated with campaigning on Scottish rape law, including the admissibility of evidence concerning a complainant's previous sexual history, corroboration, anonymity and the treatment of rape within marriage. In 1982, ERCC joined with the Strathclyde Rape Crisis Centre to support proposals for a Scottish Sexual Offences (Evidence) Bill intended to restrict the use of irrelevant evidence about women’s character and previous sexual relationships. This initiative did not secure parliamentary support. Following this, in a statement, the ERCC criticised the limited political will for reform within the Scottish legal system.

The organisation, established and maintained through donations. They were deemed ineligible for Urban Aid in 1982, because they were unable to provide numbers of uptake in urban areas, and opposed identification of working class areas as more prone to sexual violence. They continued to resist external funding until 1987, because members feared that financial dependence might compromise its feminist ethos and autonomy. However, the limitations of relying exclusively on volunteers eventually led to a change in policy. The Social Work Committee of Lothian Regional Council began contributing half of the centre's running costs in 1987. Edinburgh District Council's Women's Committee also provided assistance. Following internal consultation on the status, responsibilities and conditions of paid staff, ERCC secured funding for its first paid worker. Lily Greenan, a former volunteer, returned to the organisation full-time in 1992 in that role. Urban Aid funding began in 1993 to fund outreach work.

=== Following devolution ===
The advent of devolution in 1999 led to the formation of a Scottish Executive. They published a National Strategy to Address Domestic Abuse the following year, which followed up on earlier work but demonstrated a commitment to tackling the matter. In 2002 this led to the establishment of Rape Crisis Scotland, a charity that received funding from the Scottish Executive, and was co-founded by Sandy Brindley in cooperation with the existing independent rape crisis services to provide a strategic national voice for the services and to liaise with government. Brindley became the National Coordinator, and later chief Executive of the charity. In 2004 the Scottish Executive sought to recognise the historical underfunding of rape crisis centres by establishing the Violence Against Women Fund and the Rape Crisis Specific Fund, which provided funding to ERCC and other centres. This saw funding increase significantly at a time when the centre faced closure owing to insufficient volunteers coming forward.

Rape Crisis Scotland published national standards in 2011, developed in conjunction with the member services. These standards were then adopted by ERCC and the other member services. The standards were designed to be a "benchmark of excellence" and to set out standards for the provision of specialist rape crisis services.

In 2021 The Scottish Executive awarded ERCC emergency funding of £760,000 over two years, with the policy aim of reducing long waiting lists at rape crisis centres. The funding expired in 2024. Highlighting the forthcoming drop in funding, Mridul Wadhwa, who was the Chief Executive Officer (CEO) at the time, issued a statement in December 2023, saying "There is huge demand for all of our support and advocacy services. This year we had to take the difficult decision to close most of our services to new referrals because we do not have the resources to meet the need for our support, and survivors were having to wait over a year for our vital support." She argued that the loss of funding would exacerbate this situation. The Scottish Executive continued to fund ERCC, awarding in excess of £1 million core funding between 2021 and 2024, and £600,000 through the Tampon Tax scheme.

=== First Chief Executive Officer ===
Mridul Wadhwa's appointment as the organisation's CEO in 2021 proved controversial and was subject to protests. She moved from the Forth Valley Rape Crisis Centre, where there had also been protests. Protestors argued that the centre had relied upon a Schedule 9 exception under the Equality Act 2010 to limit applications to women. They argued that as Whadwa, a trans woman, held no Gender Recognition Certificate (GRC), she was legally ineligible for the role. Protests also took the form of direct harassement of Wadhwa, and on social media, and forced the centre to temporarily close and increase its security measures.

In a 2021 interview on the Guilty Feminist podcast, Wadhwa said that ERCC would serve survivors with "unacceptable beliefs", including racism and transphobia, but that they should "expect to be challenged" on those beliefs. Wadhwa's comments were criticised, including by For Women Scotland, and J. K. Rowling stated that the suggestion that rape survivors should "reframe their trauma" inspired her to create Beira's Place as a by-and-for service, a support and counselling service for women who are survivors of sexual violence in Edinburgh which does not employ or serve transgender women. Wadhwa said her words were taken out context.

=== Employment Tribunal and independent review ===
In an Employment Tribunal, Adams v Edinburgh Rape Crisis Centre (2024), counsellor Roz Adams brought a case that she had been discriminated against and constructively dismissed by ERCC. She had sought guidance on whether she could disclose a colleague’s biological sex to a service user who had asked. Senior management interpreted her query as evidence of "inherently hateful" transphobic views. The tribunal described the ensuing disciplinary process as "completely spurious and mishandled" and "deeply flawed", and was motivated by a belief among senior managers that Adams's gender-critical beliefs were inherently discriminatory. The disciplinary process has been widely reported as "Kafkaesque" after the tribunal characterised a remark by ERCC's Chief Operating Officer, suggesting unspecified prior comments at unspecified times were the cause of gross misconduct, as "reminiscent of the work of Franz Kafka". The tribunal upheld Adams's claims of discrimination and constructive dismissal. The employment judge said that Mridul Wadhwa, the chief executive of the Centre, had been involved in the disciplinary process, and referred to her as being behind a "heresy hunt" against Adams. According to The Times, two members of the board resigned after the judgment. The tribunal later ruled that ERCC must pay Adams £68,989.71 as compensation for discrimination, constructive dismissal, and emotional pain and suffering. ERCC was also ordered to make a public apology to Adams on its website, and to refer sexual assault survivors to Beira's Place.

In September 2024, Rape Crisis Scotland paused referrals to Edinburgh Rape Crisis Centre after an independent review into practices and procedures found it had not adhered to national standards. On 13 September 2024 it was announced that Wadhwa had resigned. The review commissioned by Rape Crisis Scotland found that she "did not understand the limits on her role's authority, when to refer decisions to trustees and failed to set professional standards of behaviour". The review also found that the Edinburgh Rape Crisis Centre had not protected women-only spaces and had not put survivors first. Among the failures cited was not clarifying the birth sex of staff members, and requiring survivors to request if they wanted to be seen by a cisgender staff member specifically.

== Organisational structure ==
Originally established as a voluntary collective, Edinburgh Rape Crisis Centre was incorporated as a charity and private limited company in October 2025, after which it was governed by a board of directors. The first coordinator of the centre, Caroline Burrell, was then appointed. She led the centre as Centre Director for 16 years, until April 2021. She was followed in role by Maggie Chapman for an interim period as Chief Operating Officer,, ahead of the appointment of the first Chief Executive Officer (CEO), Mridul Wadhwa who was in post from June 2021 to September 2024. As of 2026 the CEO post remains vacant.

== Services ==
The centre serves people residing in Edinburgh, East Lothian, and Midlothian who are at least 12 years old.

ERCC offers a range of services including:

- Support Service: Emotional and practical support in Edinburgh, East Lothian, and Midlothian.
- STAR Project: Specialized support for young people aged 12–18.
- Advocacy Service: Support for survivors engaging with the criminal justice system.
- SIA Project: Support for black and minority ethnic (BME) survivors.
- Student Survivors Project: Counseling for university and college students.
- Prevention Work: Workshops on sexual violence for 11–25 year-olds.

== Bibliography ==
- Bennett, Andrew (July 2025). "Kafkaesque: The Bureaucratisation of Ethics, Human Resources and the Law". Oxford Literary Review. 47 (1): 19–24. doi:10.3366/olr.2025.0451. hdl:1983/cff3d2f3-aedb-4b29-add0-20b98800e9f5. ISSN 0305-1498.
- Breitenbach, Esther; Mackay, Fiona (2001). Women and Contemporary Scottish Politics: An Anthology. Polygon at Edinburgh. ISBN 978-1-902930-24-4.
- Brindley, Sandy; Burman, Michele (6 April 2011). "Meeting the challenge? Responding to rape in Scotland". International approaches to rape: 0. doi:10.1332/policypress/9781847426208.003.0008.
- Ling, Vicky (2024). "Edinburgh Rape Crisis National Service Standards Report" (PDF). Rape Crisis Scotland.
- Maitland, Eileen, ed. (2009). Woman to Woman An Oral History of Rape Crisis in Scotland 1976–1991. Glasgow: Rape Crisis Scotland. ISBN 9780956148605.

=== Primary sources ===
- "EWRASAC TIMELINE: 35 years of rape crisis services in Edinburgh" (PDF). ercc.scot. Edinburgh Rape Crisis Centre. n.d.
- Frances-White, Deborah; Bob, Kemah; Wadhwa, Mridul (2 August 2021). "Creating Our Own World with Kemah Bob and Mridul Wadhwa". The Guilty Feminist (Podcast). Archived from the original on 26 October 2022.
- Wadhwa, Mridul (12 August 2021). "Statement". edinburghrapecrisis. ERCC. Archived from the original on 12 March 2023.
