= Shakti Women's Aid =

- Formation: 1986
- Location: Edinburgh, Scotland, UK
- Services: Domestic Violence Support
- Website: shaktiedinburgh.co.uk

Shakti Women’s Aid is a domestic abuse support service based in Edinburgh, Scotland. It helps black and minority ethnic women, children, and young people who have experienced domestic abuse. They work closely with the Scottish Government, Police Scotland, NHS Scotland, and other statutory and voluntary services. They provide helpline services for user and consultancy for other agencies. In 1987, Shakti opened the first refuge for BME women in Edinburgh.

Shakti (the name means ‘the strength and power of women’) was established in 1986. to work with women and children from minority ethnic and black communities who don't seek help from mainstream organisations because they feel that their particular issues are not understood.

The organisation is a member organisation of Scottish Women's Aid.

It has staff members who between them speak 18 different languages (including Polish, Mandarin, Swahili, Arabic, Urdu and Spanish), working in Edinburgh and the Lothians, Fife, Dundee and the Forth Valley. It also has a specialist children’s service.

Shakti lead a number of campaigns to highlight issues for BME people in Scotland
