= Scottish Feminist Judgments Project =

The Scottish Feminist Judgments Project brought together legal academics, practising lawyers and judges to imagine how 16 important legal judgments from the past might have been decided differently if the judge had adopted a feminist perspective. As a result it is hoped that effort will be taken more widely to think about how laws can be made and applied in a more gender equitable way.

== Background ==
To mark 100 years of women in law the project found the decisions the judges had reached were by not inevitable, and that, in many cases, a feminist perspective would have changed the outcome and taken the law in a different direction. The project was co-ordinated by legal academics Professor Sharon Cowan, Dr Chloë Kennedy and Professor Vanessa Munro and explored Scotland's distinctive national identity, unique legal traditions and the interplay between gender, class, and citizenship.

The project resulted in the publication of an anthology, (Re)Creating Law from the Outside In

The project also generated a number of creative outputs including a display in the Scottish Parliament in 2018 sponsored by Gail Ross MSP.

The Scottish project exists as part of a larger context of other, international, feminist judgement projects
