= Scottish Women's Aid =

- Founded: 1973
- VAT ID no.: Registered company no SC128433
- Registration no.: Charity number SC001099
- Purpose: Domestic abuse, women
- Location: 2nd Floor, 132 Rose Street, Edinburgh
- Coordinates: 55°57′07″N 3°12′06″W
- Origins: Inspired by Chiswick Women's Aid
- Region served: Scotland
- Method: Helpline, website, advocacy, advertising campaigns
- Revenue: £1,018,250
- Website: http://www.womensaid.scot

Scottish Women's Aid is the lead domestic abuse organisation in Scotland.

The charity plays a vital role coordinating, influencing and campaigning for effective responses to domestic abuse and supports a network of 36 Women's Aid services across Scotland delivering crucial support including refuge, counselling and outreach at a local level.

Scottish Women's Aid also took over management of Scotland's Domestic Abuse and Forced Marriage Helpline in 2016, a national helpline that works in partnership with the Men's Advice Line to provide a 24/7 service to anyone concerned about their own relationship, or about somebody they know.

== History ==
Women's Aid began in Scotland in the 1970s. Its roots were in the Women's Liberation Movement (WLM), a feminist social movement which emerged in many countries around the world (including Scotland) during the late 1960s. It brought together a diverse range of women who were angry about the limitations women faced in their everyday lives. Through creative forms of protest they made people aware of the inequalities women faced. They campaigned on a number of issues including equal pay, free childcare, financial and legal independence, an end to discrimination against lesbians, and free and safe access to abortion. They challenged the way women were viewed and talked about in society and were very important in encouraging women to be more confident in making demands.

The WLM in Scotland first emerged in Edinburgh, Glasgow, St Andrews, Dundee, Aberdeen, and Lerwick. Groups of women in these towns and cities got together to discuss their anger and frustration, and from these discussions ideas for political action emerged. These campaigns included lobbying for equal pay, spray-painting over offensive advertising, and demonstrating for women's right to choose. They set up a range of organisations and groups which last to this day, including Women's Aid.

For some WLM activists, focusing on tackling violence against women was a way to take practical action to challenge inequality. This resulted in the first Women's Aid groups being established in Scotland in Glasgow and Edinburgh in 1973. This was soon followed by Women's Aid groups in Dundee, Kirkcaldy, Perth and further afield. By 1976 it was agreed there was a need for an organising body to coordinate the growing network of groups, and so Scottish Women's Aid was founded the same year. Scottish Women's Aid was set up to nurture new groups as well as to support established groups through research, legal advice and campaigning for changes to the law.

Women's Aid in Scotland has been at the forefront of supporting women, children and young people experiencing domestic abuse; lobbying for policy changes; conducting research to enhance understandings of domestic abuse; and challenging negative attitudes. During the last 40+ years, Women's Aid has marched, protested, lobbied, and campaigned with the ultimate aim of ending domestic abuse.

During this time, Women's Aid in Scotland has gone through a lot of changes but at its core remains the focus on supporting women, children and young people who have experienced domestic abuse. Speaking Out: Recalling Women's Aid in Scotland, a two-year heritage project coordinated by Scottish Women's Aid, sought to discover, record, and celebrate the history of Women's Aid in Scotland.

In 2018, Scottish Women's Aid won their campaign for the introduction of legislation that criminalises psychological domestic abuse and coercive and controlling behaviour. This legislation came into force on the 1st of April 2019.

== Funding ==
Scottish Women's Aid receives the majority of its funding from taxpayers and a variety of project based funds. It also accepts donations from individuals through its website. In 2009 it had an income of over £1 million. in 2018 Scottish Women’s Aid was granted training funding of £165,000 from the Scottish Government as a Domestic Abuse Bill progressed through Parliament. Scottish Women's Aid received funds in 2020 of £1,350,000 from the Scottish Government’s £350 million Communities Fund to ensure key support services were maintained In July 2021 a £5m fund to help support victims of gender-based violence was established and Scottish Woman's Aid benefited from new investment.

== See also ==
- Women's Aid Federation of England
- Rape Crisis Scotland
