= For Women Scotland =

Scottish advocacy group

- Abbreviation: FWS
- Formation: June 2018; 8 years ago
- Type: Campaign group
- Registration no.: SC669393 (Scotland)
- Legal status: Not-for-profit company
- Region served: Scotland
- Directors: Trina Budge; Marion Calder; Susan Smith
- Website: forwomen.scot

For Women Scotland (FWS) is a Scottish anti-transgender and gender-critical feminist campaign group. It campaigns against reforms allowing individuals to change their recorded sex in legal documents by means of self-declaration, and was formed in opposition to the trans-inclusive stance of existing women's groups in Scotland.

For Women Scotland has stated its beliefs that there are only two sexes, that a person's sex is not a choice, and that it can not be changed. It also stated that proposed changes to the Gender Recognition Act 2004 to allow 16 and 17 year olds to change their legal gender through self-identification "would erode women's rights and would violate the Equality Act 2010."

In April 2025, a lengthy legal campaign started by the group resulted in the Supreme Court ruling that "the terms woman and sex in the Equality Act 2010 refer to a biological woman and biological sex".

== Foundation and reception ==
The group was established in 2018 in response to the Scottish Government's plans to reform the Gender Recognition Act. The directors of For Women Scotland are Trina Budge, Marion Calder, and Susan Smith. Magdalen Berns was a co-founder. Calder, Berns, Budge, and Smith began making plans for the group in 2017, after having seen each other's posts on Mumsnet.

Legal scholar Sandra Duffy described For Women Scotland in 2025 as an anti-trans group. Criminologist and gender studies scholar Sarah Lamble argued the "gender critical organisations For Women Scotland, and Women & Girls Scotland, were established because existing women’s groups in Scotland are trans inclusive."

Like the gender-critical groups Fair Play for Women and Transgender Trend in England, For Women Scotland formed due to their perception that expanded trans rights, led by Stonewall's advocacy, would erode single-sex spaces.

The group has been described as anti-trans by Pink News, MSNBC, Time Magazine and Gay Times and as trans-exclusionary radical feminist.

In November 2021, author J. K. Rowling hailed the group for its support, tweeting "Thank you, my sisters xxx." In October 2022, writing in The Sunday Times, she described For Women Scotland as "a grassroots feminist group that has emerged as a leading voice for Scottish women over the past few years". In December 2022, Rowling announced that Susan Smith would sit on the board of Beira's Place, a "new women-only support service for victims of sexual violence".

For Women Scotland says that proposed changes to the Gender Recognition Act 2004 to allow 16 and 17 year olds to change their legal gender through self-identification “would erode women's rights and would violate the Equality Act 2010.” It also says that it supports legislation to support vulnerable groups, provided existing rights are not affected. The group has stated its beliefs "that there are only two sexes, that a person’s sex is not a choice, nor can it be changed".

== Activities ==
=== First public meeting in Edinburgh ===
In February 2019, the group held its first public meeting in Edinburgh. The venue received a bomb threat and had to fly its head of security to Edinburgh from London and attracted an audience of around 300, protested by about 40, and was described by The Guardian as "most public expression in Scotland of increasingly vocal concerns around transgender issues". Susan Smith said:

"We are concerned that the Scottish government is sleepwalking towards a significant erosion of women's rights, both in terms of proposals to reform the GRA to allow self-identification and the failure to prevent other organisations running ahead of the law and adopting policies which are in breach of the Equality Act. We’re not here to quibble about toilets and we’re not here to create trouble for those who have battled crippling gender dysphoria. We welcome extra provisions for other vulnerable groups that don't involve dismantling existing rights. If we cannot see sex, then we cannot see sexism, we cannot define sexuality, and it is the most vulnerable women who will suffer from this."

Critics of the meeting included the Intersectional feminist group Sisters Uncut Edinburgh who said: "While For Women Scot do a sterling job of making transphobia look respectable, their actions and statements do real damage to Scotland's trans and non-binary community." Susan Smith has since said that the campaigning of For Women Scotland “doesn’t mean that other groups can’t work out their rights but if they are only and solely dependent on taking away ours, then that’s not a movement anybody should respect.”

=== Hate Crime and Public Order (Scotland) Act 2021 ===
During proceedings regarding the bill eventually passed as the Hate Crime and Public Order (Scotland) Act 2021, For Women Scotland presented its concerns regarding free speech to the Justice Committee of the Scottish Parliament: the group feared it could be prosecuted over its position on women's rights and transgender people.

=== Gender Representation on Public Boards (Scotland) Act 2018 ===
In March 2021, the group lost their judicial review at the Court of Session to remove trans women from the definition of "woman" in the Gender Representation on Public Boards (Scotland) Act 2018, a law intended to grow the number of women on public boards. The Scottish Trans Alliance had intervened, describing the case as "hurtful and pointless". The group appealed, and in February 2022, Lady Dorrian found in their favour, ruling that the act was outwith legislative competence.

In July 2022, the group sought a second judicial review, due to a "reference to the Gender Recognition Act" in revised statutory guidance of April 2022 from the Scottish Ministers on the legislation regarding representation on public boards. On 13 December 2022, the Court of Session dismissed the second judicial review and ruled that the Scottish government's guidance that "woman" includes a transgender woman with a Gender Recognition Certificate (GRC) is lawful.

In November 2023, the group lost an appeal to the Court of Session, which ruled that trans women who hold Gender Recognition Certificates do count as female for the purposes of the Act. In February 2024, the group was granted permission to appeal the Court of Session ruling to the Supreme Court of the United Kingdom. Funding for the legal challenge through crowdsourced donations amounted to £197,000 from 4023 donors, including £70,000 from author J. K. Rowling.

The Supreme Court heard the appeal on 26 and 27 November 2024, with judgment due in "weeks or months". For Women Scotland called on the court to find sex an "immutable biological state". The Scottish Government argued that someone who had acquired status as a woman using a gender recognition certificate was entitled to protections under the Equality Act just as those who were women at birth were.

On 16 April 2025, the Supreme Court ruled that the definitions of "man", "woman", and "sex" in the Equality Act 2010 referred to biological sex, deeming that it would be "incoherent" to include trans people with GRCs in these categories. The judges said they were not ruling more broadly on the definition of "sex" or whether trans women are women in other contexts, saying "it was not the role of the court to adjudicate on the meaning of gender or sex". Lord Hodge counselled against interpreting the ruling as "a triumph of one or more groups in our society at the expense of another", reaffirming that trans people remain protected from discrimination under other provisions of the Equality Act that classify "gender reassignment" as a protected characteristic.

Following the ruling, the group received messages including death threats and hostility towards women.

In August 2025, For Women Scotland made a legal application for the Scottish government’s policies on schools and prisons to be quashed, on the basis that they were not in accordance with the Supreme Court judgment. In June 2026, Judge Lady Ross upheld the challenge to the SNP policy that housed some trans women in female-only jails, and ruled that prisons must be divided by biological sex instead of gender identity.

=== Police investigation involving Marion Millar ===
In June 2021, Marion Millar, an accountant from Airdrie who worked for the group as their accountant, was charged in connection with tweets alleged to be homophobic and transphobic, and was interviewed at Coatbridge police station under the Communications Act 2003. A spokesperson for FWS said: "Marion is naturally upset that the police have decided to press ahead with charges. [...] Sadly, in Scotland, it seems both free speech and women's rights are under attack."

In July 2021, FWS organised a rally in support of Marion Millar on Glasgow Green, addressed by Graham Linehan, among others.

On 28 October 2021 the Crown Office discontinued all proceedings against Marion Millar pending a review of the case.

=== The "Women's Rights Demo" at the Scottish Parliament ===
On 1 September 2021, the group organised a demonstration outside the Scottish Parliament, Edinburgh, demanding that the SNP-Green government "protect their sex-based rights". Demonstrators called on MSPs to "respect women's rights, and single-sex spaces and services, and not to allow men identifying as women to use them." The Herald estimated there were 400 people in the main demo, and 100 at a counter-protest.

Marion Calder of For Women Scotland, said: "They need to understand that women won't wheesht, that they need to consider women's rights within any piece of legislation, especially over the next year, whether it is self-ID, GRA reform, the census, or the impact of the Hate Crime Bill and the chilling effect on women's rights and being unable to speak out."

=== Provision of single-sex lavatories in schools ===
In June 2022, the group wrote to the 32 Scottish councils asking that they provide single-sex facilities in schools. The letter quotes a legal opinion by Aidan O'Neill QC that gender-neutral facilities breach equality law, and claims that they cause distress to female pupils.

=== Controversy over "eunuch" as a gender identity ===
In June 2022, the group criticised NHS Scotland for its alignment with the World Professional Association for Transgender Health (WPATH), following the accidental publication on an NHS Scotland website of a Standards of Care document from WPATH that argued for the recognition of "eunuch" as a gender identity.

=== Protest against Gender Recognition Reform Bill at the Scottish Parliament ===
In October 2022, the group organised a protest against the Gender Recognition Reform (Scotland) Bill at the Scottish Parliament. Speakers included Maya Forstater, Helen Joyce, and Johann Lamont. In support, J. K. Rowling said on Twitter that: "I stand in solidarity with For Women Scotland and all women protesting and speaking outside the Scottish parliament. #NoToSelfID." She also tweeted a picture of herself wearing a T-shirt that said, "Nicola Sturgeon . . . destroyer of women's rights". In response, First Minister Nicola Sturgeon said ""I’ve spent my entire life campaigning for women’s rights and I’m a passionate feminist with lots of evidence behind that… The gender recognition bill which comes before the Scottish parliament in a couple of weeks time is about reforming an existing process. It doesn’t give any more rights to trans people, and it doesn’t take any more rights away from women".

=== Battle of Ideas festival ===
In December 2022, the group shared a platform with members of the Scottish Family Party at a Battle of Ideas festival event in Glasgow, calling for “education not indoctrination” in schools.

=== Scottish Prison Service transgender custody policy ===
In August 2025, the group made a legal application for the Scottish government's existing policies on transgender people in schools and prisons to be quashed, on the basis that they were not in accordance with the For Women Scotland Ltd v The Scottish Ministers Supreme Court judgement.

For Women Scotland petitioned for a judicial review of the Scottish Prison Service's "Policy for the Management of Transgender People in Custody Operational Guidance". The policy had provided that there should be an individual risk assessment for each trans prisoner, before deciding whether to place them in the men's or women's prison estate. The rules did not include those with a history of violence against women and girls, who were judged to present a risk.

For Women Scotland contended that the Scottish Ministers had a statutory obligation to provide women-only prison accommodations, and that in light of the Supreme Court's decision in For Women Scotland Ltd v The Scottish Ministers, "woman" was to be construed by reference to biological sex. The respondents argued that the petition was irrelevant as no specific claim of discrimination or harassment had been levied, and secondly that it may be necessary to place transgender prisoners in a prison congruent with their gender identity to avoid a European Convention on Human Rights violation. Interventions were made in the case by the Scottish Human Rights Commission and the Equality and Human Rights Commission. The Scottish government cited Article 6 of the European Convention on Human Rights in relation to the rights of trans people to live as their gender identity, that a blanket ruling that transgender prisoners could only be placed in a prison matching their assigned sex risked violating their rights, noting that decisions on placement had been based on individualized assessment, and that there had been no "significant operational issue" as a result.

On 19 June 2026, the Court of Session ruled the current prison guidance "unlawful" and in conflict with the requirement for accommodation to be provided separately for men and women. Lady Ross held that while trans prisoners have rights under Article 8, this does not extend to a right to be accommodated in a prison for the opposite biological sex, as "Article 8 rights are qualified and there is a justification for maintaining sex segregation in prisons." She noted however that in an exceptional individual case where there is a threat to life through suicide, it may be necessary to consider alternative accommodation arrangements.

On 22 June 2026, the Scottish Prison Service withdrew its existing guidance on transgender prisoners, and Justice Secretary Neil Gray confirmed that trans inmates would be moved into prisons according to their biological sex. The Scottish Government confirmed it would not appeal the ruling. In August 2026, the court issued an order to quash the guidance and ensure it cannot be restored in future.

As of April 2026, the government had incurred costs of £187,957 in relation to the prisons case, while For Women Scotland said the government would also be liable for its costs of over £200,000. For Women Scotland hailed the outcome as "a victory for the very vulnerable women in the prison estate". Trans rights organization Scottish Trans warned that the ruling would result in trans prisoners' human rights being violated and place them at very real risk of serious harm, noting that a fatal accident inquiry had found that the Scottish Prison Service had unlawfully segregated trans woman Sarah Jane Riley, and failed to properly assess her risk of suicide, when she was held in solitary confinement in HM Prison Perth in 2019 where she died by suicide. Scottish Trans also noted that in 2023, the Council of Europe's Committee for the Prevention of Torture published core principles stating that "as a matter of principle, transgender persons should be accommodated in the prison section corresponding to the gender with which they identify."

== See also ==
- Anti-transgender movement in the United Kingdom
- Fair Play for Women
- LGB Alliance
- Sex Matters (advocacy group)
- The Women Who Wouldn't Wheesht (book)
- Woman's Place UK
