= Transgender rights in the United Kingdom =

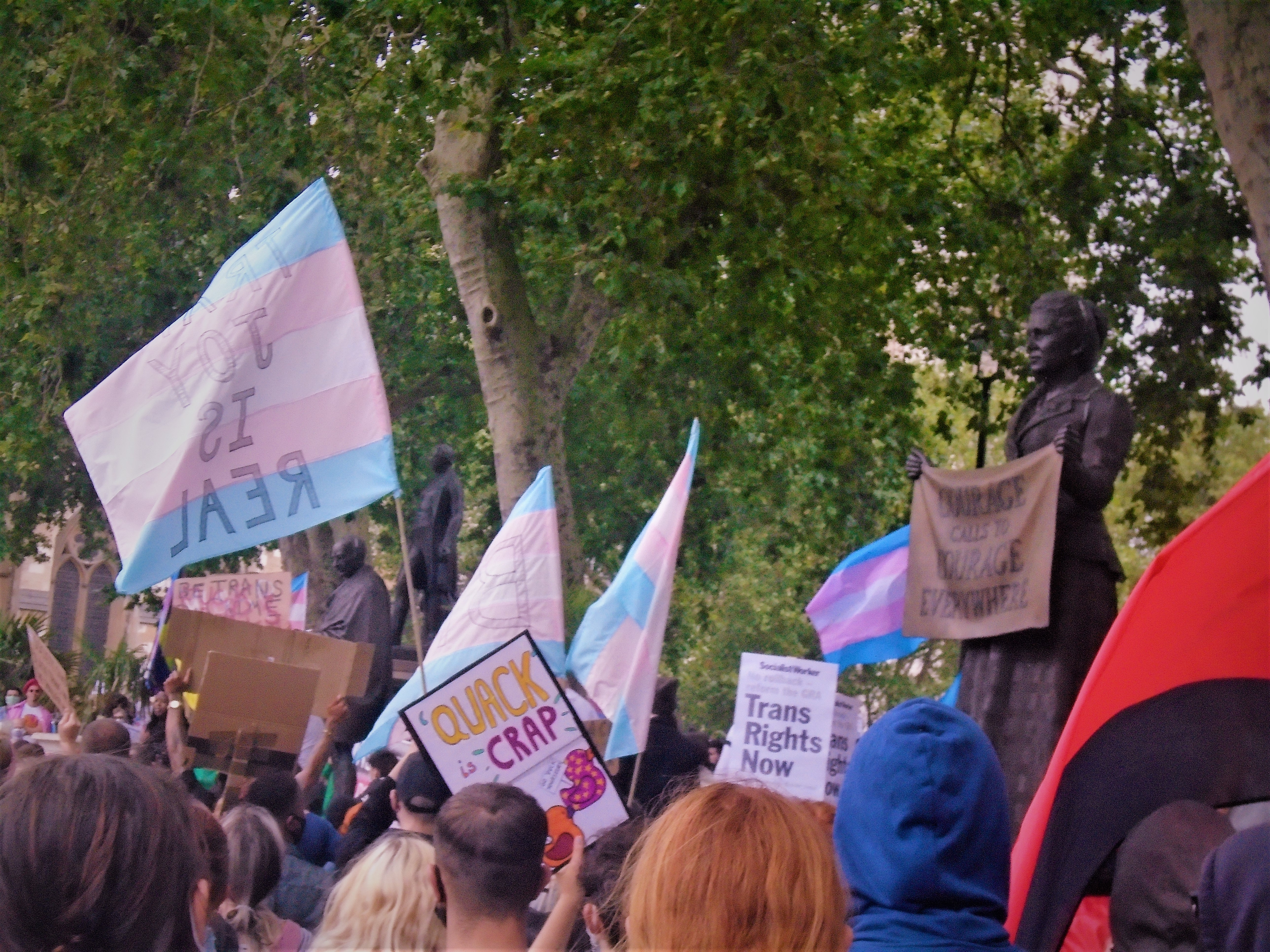
Protest in support of transgender rights at Parliament Square, 2020

Transgender rights in the United Kingdom have varied significantly since its initial formation in 1707. As of 2026, transgender people—people whose gender identity differs from their sex as assigned at birth—are only recognised under UK Equality law as their "biological sex" as assigned at birth, i.e. trans women are considered men, and trans men are considered women, with relevant legal rights and privileges determined entirely on the basis of such.

The UK was one of the last countries in Europe to introduce legislation allowing transgender people to legally change their gender, with the Gender Recognition Act 2004. The 2025 Supreme Court ruling in For Women Scotland Ltd v The Scottish Ministers determined that having a gender recognition certificate did not change a person's sex for the purposes of the 2010 Equality Act.

Transgender people in the UK continue to face significant challenges including barriers to healthcare, discrimination and prejudice, increased media focus, and widespread opposition to their rights. Gender-affirming care is considered difficult to access for adults, with an average wait time of 25 years for the first appointment. Gender-affirming care is banned for youths.

== Legal rights ==
The existing legal framework for trans rights included protections under the Equality Act 2010 until an amendment in 2025, which prohibited discrimination on the basis of gender reassignment. Despite these protections, concerns have been raised by human rights organisations, medical professionals, and advocacy groups about the adequacy of access to gender-affirming healthcare, long NHS waiting times, and the social and political climate surrounding trans rights. By the 2020s, topic became increasingly prominent in public discourse, with growing visibility of trans people, media coverage, and policy debates shaping the landscape of rights and recognition. Trans people were able to change their passports and driving licences to indicate their preferred binary gender since at least 1970.

Prior to the 1970 ruling in Corbett v Corbett, transgender people were able to have their birth certificate informally amended to reflect their gender identity. The ruling prevented the amendment of the sex marker on birth certificates for other than clerical errors. The 2002 Goodwin v United Kingdom ruling by the European Court of Human Rights resulted in parliament passing the Gender Recognition Act 2004 to allow people to apply to change their legal gender, through application to a tribunal called the Gender Recognition Panel. This meant that the UK was one of the last countries in Europe to introduce legislation allowing transgender people to legally change their gender. The application requires the submission of medical evidence and a statutory declaration. The tribunal is made up of medical and legal members appointed by the Lord Chancellor.

Anti-discrimination measures protecting transgender people have existed in the UK since 1999, and were strengthened in the 2000s to include anti-harassment wording. Gender reassignment was included as a protected characteristic in the Equality Act 2010. With the 2013 introduction of same-sex marriage, it became possible for a spouse to legally change their gender without requiring a divorce in the UK, with the exception of Northern Ireland, where this became an option nearly a decade later on 13 January 2020.

Starting in the late 2010s, the treatment of trans people in the UK became an increasing source of controversy, particularly in regards to British news media. The Council of Europe criticised what it described as a "baseless and concerning" level of transphobia gaining traction in British society. YouGov noted an "overall erosion in support towards transgender rights" among the general public by the early 2020s, and while Ipsos found that most Britons supported trans people getting protections for discrimination, support for gender-affirming healthcare in the UK was amongst the lowest of the 30 countries they studied.

In July 2024, UK Prime Minister and Labour Party leader Keir Starmer stated that trans women should not have the right to use women-only spaces, even with a gender recognition certificate. He also ruled out allowing trans people to self-ID. Starmer also said he would continue the block on the Gender Recognition Reform Bill in Scotland. In December 2024, Starmer followed through on this by making the ban on puberty blockers to treat gender dysphoria in under-18s permanent on the basis of "independent expert advice that there is currently an unacceptable safety risk in the continued prescription of puberty blockers to children". Despite the assertion that puberty blockers are unsafe when prescribed to children to treat gender dysphoria, they remain available for the treatment of precocious puberty in children.

== Legal recognition of gender identity ==
=== Gender recognition Act 2004 ===
The Gender Recognition Act 2004 was drafted in response to court rulings from the European Court of Human Rights. On 11 July 2002, in Goodwin & I v United Kingdom, the European Court of Human Rights ruled that rights to privacy and family life were being infringed and that "the UK Government had discriminated based on the following: Violation of Article 8 and Article 12 of the European Convention on Human Rights". Following this judgment, the UK government had to introduce new legislation to comply. In response to its obligation, the UK Parliament passed the Gender Recognition Act 2004, which effectively granted full legal recognition for binary transgender people.

Since 4 April 2005, as per the Gender Recognition Act 2004, it is possible for transgender people to change their legal gender in the UK. Transgender people must present evidence to a Gender Recognition Panel, which considers their case and issues a Gender Recognition Certificate (GRC); they must have transitioned two years before a GRC is issued. It is not a requirement for Gender-affirming surgery to have taken place, although such surgery will be accepted as supporting evidence for a case where it has taken place. There is formal approval of medical gender reassignment available either on the National Health Service (NHS) or privately. If the person's birth or adoption was registered in the United Kingdom, they may also be issued a new birth certificate after their details have been entered onto the Gender Recognition Register.

In June 2020, a report published by the European Commission ranked the procedure established in the Gender Recognition Act 2004 as amongst the worst in Europe, placing the UK into cluster 2 alongside Slovakia, the Czech Republic, Poland, Finland, Austria, Estonia, Spain and Italy, which the report classified as "least accessible procedures (cluster 1 and 2)" with "intrusive medical requirements... often combined with a requirement of diagnosis of gender dysphoria", which means it now lags behind international human rights standards. In September 2020, the UK government published the results of a public consultation into reform of the Gender Recognition Act 2004 which had been launched in 2018. This showed majority support for wide-ranging changes; however, the UK Government decided not to change the existing law.

==== Cost ====
In April 2021, it was reported that the fee for a Gender Recognition Certificate would be reduced from £140 to £5 in early May 2021.

=== For Women Scotland Ltd v The Scottish Ministers ===
In April 2025, the Supreme Court ruled in For Women Scotland Ltd v The Scottish Ministers that the definitions of "sex", "man", and "woman" in the Equality Act 2010 were "always intended" to refer to "biological sex" and not gender, as it would not be "clear and consistent" to include people with GRCs in these specific definitions. Lord Hodge said the ruling does not impact the protection of trans people under the law via the protected characteristic of gender reassignment. Lord Hodge also said the judgment should not be seen as "a triumph of one or more groups in our society at the expense of another".

Shortly following this ruling, on 25 April 2025, the EHRC issued guidance in which, based on trans women being "biological men" and trans men being "biological women", they declared that they must be excluded from sex-segregated spaces accordingly. The guidance applied to any school, workplace, sporting body, publicly accessible service (such as restaurants, shops, hospitals, or shelters), and any association of 25 people or more. The guidance stated that while trans women and trans men must be barred from the women's and men's facilities respectively, they could also be barred from the men's and women's as well, so long as there is at least one facility available for them to use. However, the guidance also stated that if only mixed-sex facilities were available, this could constitute discrimination against women, and that the presence of segregated spaces was compulsory in the workplace. The guidance also stated that women-only and lesbian-only groups must bar trans women from entry. The guidance included: "It is not compulsory for services that are open to the public to be provided on a single-sex basis or to have single-sex facilities such as toilets. These can be single-sex if it is a proportionate means of achieving a legitimate aim and they meet other conditions in the Act. However, it could be indirect sex discrimination against women if the only provision is mixed-sex."

In response to the ruling, ILGA-Europe reclassified the UK as having "no functioning legal or administrative process for legal gender recognition", placing it alongside Albania, Bulgaria, Hungary and Russia in Europe.

=== Legal recognition of non-binary identities ===
There are no formal legal recognitions for people of non-binary gender in any jurisdiction of the United Kingdom. However, non-binary status is recognised in the census of England and Wales. The title "Mx." is also accepted in the United Kingdom by government organisations and businesses as an alternative for non-binary people, while the Higher Education Statistics Agency allows the use of non-binary gender markers for students in higher education. In 2015, early day motion EDM660 was registered with Parliament, calling for citizens to be permitted access to the 'X' marker on passports but a formal petition through the Parliamentary Petitions Service, the following year, calling for EDM660 to be passed into law gained only 2,500 signatures before closing.

In September 2015, the Ministry of Justice responded to a petition calling for self-determination of legal gender, stating that they were not aware of "any specific detriment" experienced by non-binary people unable to have their genders legally recognised. In January 2016, the Trans Inquiry Report by the Women and Equalities Committee called for protection from discrimination of non-binary people under the Equality Act, for the 'X' gender marker to be added to passports, and for a wholesale review into the needs of non-binary people by the government within six months.

In May 2021, the Government rejected a petition to legally recognise non-binary identities, claiming there would be "complex practical consequences" for such a move. The petition has passed the threshold of 100,000 signatures to be considered for a debate in Parliament, which was held on 23 May 2022. In January 2024, judges at the High Court in London ruled that, "We have decided that whenever the Gender Recognition Act refers to 'gender' it refers to a binary concept – that is, to male, or to female gender. The GRP [Gender Recognition Panel] accordingly, had and has no power to issue a gender recognition certificate to the claimant which says that they are 'non-binary'."

== Healthcare ==
In December 2002, the Lord Chancellor's office published the Government Policy Concerning Transsexual People document that categorically states that transsexualism "is not a mental illness", but rather a "widely recognised medical condition" characterised by an "overpowering sense of different gender identity".

=== Medical treatment for adults ===
In the UK, gender-affirming care has been available on the National Health Service (NHS) since the 1960s, when early pioneers began providing medical interventions to transgender individuals. In the United Kingdom, this care may include access to hormone therapy, surgeries, voice therapy, counselling, and support with social transition, with the aim of supporting individuals to live in accordance with their gender identity, improving well-being, and reducing gender dysphoria.

The first NHS gender identity clinic was established at Charing Cross Hospital in London, which became the central hub for transgender healthcare for many decades. Over time, additional clinics have been developed across the country, though services have frequently been criticised for long waiting times, limited accessibility, and a lack of regional coverage.

The UK has historically been seen as a leader in transgender healthcare, but more recently the system has faced growing scrutiny from professional bodies, advocacy groups, and international observers regarding delays in care and the need for reform. Efforts to improve access and update care models have been met with support and controversy.

==== Adult care review ====
In April 2024, in response to the Cass Review that looked at care for minors, NHS England said it would initiate a review of all its adult gender clinics. In May 2024, Hilary Cass wrote to NHS England, to pass on feedback about adult care from clinicians who had approached her during the review process. Clinicians across the country in adult gender services had expressed concern about both the clinical practice and the model of care. Some clinicians in other settings, especially general practice, had raised concerns about the treatment of patients under their care.

On 7 August 2024, NHS England responded to the adult care letter in a status report for the under-18s services. On 8 August, NHS England said the review of adult services would be led by Dr David Levy, medical director for Lancashire and South Cumbria integrated care board, to assess "the quality (i.e. effectiveness, safety, and patient experience) and stability of each service, but also whether the existing service model is still appropriate for the patients it is caring for"; and that Dr Levy would work with a group of "expert clinicians, patients and other key stakeholders, including representatives from the Care Quality Commission (CQC), Royal Colleges and other professional bodies and will carefully consider experiences, feedback and outcomes from clinicians and patients, past and present". The first onsite visits were planned to start in September 2024. The findings would be used to support an updated adult gender service specification which will then be liable to engagement and public consultation. Unlike the Cass Review, the review of adult gender services was expected to be completed within months, rather than years.

==== Barriers to care ====
In 1999, the High Court ruled in favour of three transgender women in North West Lancashire Health Authority v A, D and G. The transgender women sued the North West Lancashire Health Authority after being denied gender reassignment surgery from 1996 to 1997. The judgment was the first time that transgender surgical operations had been tested in an open court in the United Kingdom and was described by Stephen Lodge (the solicitor representing the three women) as a "landmark in the continuing struggle for legal recognition" of transgender rights in Britain. The ruling means that it is illegal for any health authority in England or Wales to put a blanket ban on gender-affirming surgery relating to transgender people.

In November 2024, 16 transgender men threatened to sue NHS England after their surgery processes were unexpectedly halted by their providers in 2020 and a replacement provider was not appointed until a year later. They had faced up to four years of delays, leaving them without treatment. The men said that they had been forced to wait years between stages of metoidioplasty and the long waiting time was having a "vast negative impact" on their mental health as well as forcing them to live with incomplete surgery results in the meantime.

In December 2024, it was reported that a number of GPs had begun refusing or withdrawing hormone treatment from adult trans patients, for reasons including insufficient funds, GPs being "genuinely scared" about whether they can continue to offer the treatments due to the Cass Review itself, and the Royal College of General Practitioners' response to the Cass Review – despite the Cass Review only applying to youth services.

Gender-affirming care is considered difficult to access for adults, with a survey by Healthwatch in July 2025 finding that transgender and nonbinary adults in the UK were "facing severe hurdles in accessing healthcare" with only 32% rating the gender-affirming care they got from their GP as "good or very good" and many detailing experiences of "misgendering, disruptions to prescriptions, and loss of access to previous NHS records." As of October 2025, the wait time for a first appointment with an NHS gender clinic varied widely - from three months in Nottingham, to 41 years in Belfast, to 224 years in Glasgow.

In August 2026, the Welsh NHS cancelled all gender-affirming surgeries for adult patients of the Welsh Gender Service, following calls by the Welsh Conservatives for an independent review of the service. In October 2026, the English NHS issued updated guidance, under which trans people would be placed in wards according to their "biological sex" or in side rooms normally reserved for end-of-life care and infection control. Internal assessments of the policy by NHS England found that the policy could harm transgender patients.

=== Medical treatment for young people ===
The Gender Identity Development Service (GIDS) was formed at the London's St George's Hospital and moved to the Tavistock and Portman NHS Foundation Trust in 1996. GIDS was the NHS's sole gender clinic for young people until its closure, announced in 2022. Hormone blocking was initially available only for those over the age of 16. In 2011, it began to offer a "carefully selected group of young people" aged 12 and older puberty blockers. In 2014, it received NHS approval to offer them to eligible young people without enrolling them in research.

In December 2020, the High Court ruled that children under 16 in England and Wales could not consent to puberty blockers. NHS England consequently stated that any requirement for puberty blockers would have to be brought through a court order before treatment. On 29 January 2021, the High Court's order was stayed, and in September 2021 it was overturned (Bell v Tavistock). The Court of Appeal ruled that "it was for clinicians rather than the court to decide on competence" to consent to receive puberty blockers. The Appeal Court also ruled that the High Court should not have issued guidance on the Gillick test and puberty blockers, because that court should have dismissed the case when it ruled that the Tavistock guidance was lawful.

Despite the later successful appeal, the 2020 ruling caused interruptions to gender-affirming healthcare for children in the UK, with many reports of existing patients at GIDS having their treatment abruptly cut off. As of 2021 no minors were being referred for puberty blockers or hormone treatment on the NHS. As of February 2021, it had not been made clear how a court order could be brought in order for a minor to access puberty blockers, and no court orders had yet been issued, with waiting lists for hormone treatment for adults on the NHS heavily exceeding targets of 18 weeks to first appointment. However, in a separate case (AB v CD and others), the High Court ruled in March 2021 that parents are allowed to give consent on behalf of their children to receive puberty blockers without having to gain a judge's approval.

In April 2022, Secretary of State for Health and Social Care Sajid Javid announced an inquiry into gender treatment for children, following concerns raised in the interim report of the Cass Review. In June 2022, The Times reported Javid announcing a proposed change in UK medical privacy law, allowing the state to gain access to and scrutinise the medical records of all minors treated for gender dysphoria within the preceding decade, estimated at 9,000 people. The Times reported Javid having "likened political sensitivities over gender dysphoria to officials' fear of being labelled racist if they investigated abuse by men of Pakistani heritage in Rotherham". At the end of May 2022, Tavistock GIDS, the NHS' only youth gender identity clinic, reported there were over 5,035 people on its waiting list. Young people seen for the first time that month had waited on average 1,066 days for a first appointment – just under three years. In July 2022, it was announced that the NHS would close Tavistock GIDS, with the intent of transitioning to a more regional system of care access.

On 12 March 2024, NHS England announced that it would no longer prescribe puberty blockers to minors outside of use in clinical research trials. The children who were already receiving puberty blockers via NHS England would be able to continue their treatment. NHS England hoped to have a study into the use of puberty blockers in place by December 2024, with eligibility criteria yet to be decided. Children in England could have been prescribed puberty blockers through some private clinics that are not associated with NHS England. On 10 April, the Final Report of the Cass Review was published.

On 11 April 2024, the Care Quality Commission announced it will check that licensed healthcare providers that are registered with the CQC which provide care to those who are questioning their gender identity are applying new guidance recommended by the Cass Review and will take enforcement action against private clinics that prescribe puberty blockers to under-18s contrary to the policy of NHS England. While the CQC will expect all private providers registered with them to take the Cass recommendations into account, they do not have to comply with them as private providers are not bound by Cass's recommendations. At present no CQC-registered private gender care clinic issues puberty blockers.

On 21 March 2024, NHS England announced that it would prescribe hormone replacement therapy to individuals aged 16 and older. This is a departure from GIDS policy, which stipulated that young people could only access hormones at 16 if they had been on puberty blockers for a year. On 18 April 2024, Scotland's NHS announced that it would temporarily pause prescribing puberty blockers to children referred by its specialist gender clinic. The Sandyford clinic in Glasgow also said new patients aged 16 or 17 would no longer receive other hormone treatments until they were 18. The children who were already receiving puberty blockers and hormones will be able to continue their treatment. The decision to pause both these treatments for new patients was made to give the government time to review the evidence. The Scottish government plans to issue a position statement on these treatments in the coming weeks. The decision to pause these treatment prompted criticism from several organisations including the Scottish Trans and the Equality Network and the Rainbow Greens.

In April 2025, it was reported that the NHS had not issued any new prescriptions of gender-affirming hormones to minors in the year since the Cass Review was published despite them not being banned, with the NHS instead prioritising "holistic care". However, referrals to these new services are low compared to the former Gids program at Tavistock, due to the new referral process being made more complex and families choosing to get help for their children somewhere else — such as by acquiring hormones on the black market or abroad. In September 2025, the Northern Ireland Health Minister, Mike Nesbitt, announced that Cass had accepted an invitation to review Northern Ireland's gender services. The assessment was also to consider proposed reforms to unify Northern Ireland's adolescent and adult services into a single continuous model of care. Cass visited Northern Ireland in November 2025, and the review was published in February 2026.

In March 2026, NHS England paused the issuing of new prescriptions of cross-sex hormones to 16 and 17-year-olds who question their gender, following a NHS review finding that it could not say whether the treatment was either "harmful or effective".

==== Puberty blockers ban ====
In May 2024, the then Health Secretary Victoria Atkins implemented an emergency three-month ban on private prescriptions of puberty blockers which went into effect on 3 June 2024 and was set to expire on 3 September 2024. The ban restricted their use to only those already taking them, or within a clinical trial.

In July 2024, this ban was challenged by legal action in the High Court, by campaign group TransActual and Good Law Project, who claimed the ban was unlawful. On 29 July 2024, the High Court of Justice dismissed the legal challenge, with Mrs Justice Lang arguing: "While the Cass review did not conclude that puberty blockers caused a serious danger to health, that was not the question it was asked to address. In my judgment, the Cass Review's findings about the very substantial risks and very narrow benefits associated with the use of puberty blockers, and the recommendation that in future the NHS prescribing of puberty blockers to children and young people should only take place in a clinical trial, and not routinely, amounted to powerful scientific evidence in support of restrictions on the supply of puberty blockers on the grounds that they were potentially harmful."

The Health Secretary Wes Streeting welcomed the "evidence-led" decision and said efforts were being made to set up a clinical trial to "establish the evidence on puberty blockers". Following the ruling, TransActual announced that they would not appeal the decision due to limited funds and the unlikelihood of an appeal being heard before the ban expires.

In July 2024 moves to ban puberty blockers permanently were taken by the Labour Party (UK) who became the new Government of the United Kingdom that month. On 22 August 2024, the government extended the emergency ban an additional three months and it was set to expire on 26 November 2024. The ban was also extended to cover Northern Ireland, following agreement from the Northern Ireland Executive and came into effect on 27 August 2024. On 6 November 2024 the ban was extended again and was set to expire on 31 December 2024. On 11 December 2024, the ban was renewed indefinitely outside of clinical trials and is set to be reviewed again in 2027. This ban affects both NHS and private providers, though existing patients are allowed to continue their treatment.

In June 2026, in the midst of a pressure campaign by some politicians calling for the proposed clinical trial into puberty blockers to be scrapped, Cass said in an interview with BBC that she believes that since her review was published, the risks about puberty blockers had been "exaggerated" and that "we genuinely don't know if there are harms" and that a clinical trial was "essential" to figure out "whether these drugs are helpful or not".

==== Proposed reforms in 2022 ====
===== NHS England document published: 20 October =====
The NHS England published on 20 October 2022 a "Public consultation: Interim service specification for specialist gender dysphoria services for children and young people". which included significant restrictions for pre-pubertal children on social transition (which means changing one's pronouns and clothing), declaring it an active intervention with potential harms, and only authorising it in cases of "clinically significant distress or significant impairment of social functioning", whilst recognising that "social transition in pre-pubertal children is a controversial issue, that divergent views are held by health professionals".

The reported justification for this was the NHS's stated belief that health providers should be "mindful that this may be a transient phase, particularly for prepubertal children, and that there will be a range of pathways to support these children and young people and a range of outcomes." The reference to a 'transient phase' has been criticised by some, who compare the proposed policy to conversion therapy.

In the NHS's "Equality and Health Inequalities Impact Assessment -2022" of the proposed changes, it addressed potential concerns of discrimination based on the legally protected characteristic of "gender reassignment" by stating not all of the patients impacted by the proposal will be allowed to access such care by the NHS, and thus "To apply such a definition to these individuals is to make assumptions upon the aims and intentions of those referred, the certainty of those desires and their outward manifestation, and upon the appropriate treatment that may be offered and accepted in due course".

===== Criticism by WPATH =====
In November 2022, the World Professional Association of Transgender Health published a statement in which it described the methodology of treatment suggested in the proposed reforms as "tantamount to 'conversion' or 'reparative' therapy", and that the psychotherapy route of treatment recommended "seems to view gender incongruence largely as a mental health disorder or a state of confusion and withholds gender-affirming treatments on this basis". The statement further says that the proposal "makes assumptions about transgender children and adolescents which are outdated and untrue", and that it "quotes selectively and ignores newer evidence about the persistence of gender incongruence in children". It also describes the requirement to obtain medical approval to change one's clothing or pronouns as "an unconscionable degree of medical and state intrusion", and that the proposal document "makes unsupported statements about the influence of family, social, and mental health factors on the formation of gender identity".

== Sports ==
In September 2021, the UK Sports Council Equality Group issued new guidance saying that in their view, trans inclusion and "competitive fairness" cannot coexist in sports. In June 2022, the then UK Secretary of State for Digital, Culture, Media and Sport Nadine Dorries met with the heads of UK sporting bodies and told them that "elite and competitive women's sport must be reserved for people born of the female sex".

UK Athletics announced a ban on transgender women competing in the female category in the UK, with immediate effect, in March 2023, following a similar ban by World Athletics.

The English Blackball Pool Federation banned players who were "not born biologically female" from its women's competitions and teams in August 2023, a decision that withstood legal challenge for direct discrimination on the basis of gender reassignment in August 2025 on the grounds that it was the only "reasonable" way to ensure "fair competition".

The England and Wales Cricket Board announced on 2 May 2025 that, with immediate effect, "only those whose biological sex is female" would be able to participate in women's and girls' cricket, including in amateur clubs where cricket is played solely for fun, though they could continue playing in open and mixed cricket categories. Prior to this change, the policy had been that, from 2025, any player who had gone through male puberty could not play in the top two tiers of the women's game.

In May 2023, British Cycling issued a ban on transgender women competing in women's events at elite levels of the sport. This ruling impacted on transgender cyclist Emily Bridges who confirmed having no further intention of competing in cycling due to being unwilling to compete in the Open category and being banned from the Female category.

Since April 2024, England Darts has not allowed "non birth gender females" from playing in women's competitions. A motion subsequently put forth by the England, Scotland, and Wales and passed by the World Darts Federation prevents trans women from competing as women globally.

Starting 1 January 2025, British Fencing policy is that "Only individuals whose sex at birth was female may compete in the Female category", banning trans women from fencing in the female category in both UK and in BF-sanctioned international competitions.

The Football Association's policy, since 1 June 2025, is that transgender women are not allowed to play in women's football in England. The Scottish Football Association's policy, since the start of season 2025/6, is that only "biological females" are permitted to play in competitive girls' and women's football which is governed by the Scottish FA.

Since 1 September 2025, England Netball recognises female netball, male netball and mixed netball as three distinct gender participation categories, with the female category exclusively for players born female, irrespective of their gender identity. Prior to this, guidance issued in September 2021 had permitted transgender women to compete in the female category subject to satisfactory evidence regarding testosterone levels.

British Rowing announced a ban on transgender women competing in the female category from 11 September 2023, a change from the previous policy that allowed transgender women to participate in female events if their testosterone level was below a certain level for two years. However, transgender athletes who were born female and are not undergoing hormone treatment could still enter female races.

Both the Rugby Football League and the Rugby Football Union decided to ban transgender women from playing in women's rugby in 2022 in moves that followed a similar ban by World Rugby in 2020. Both organisations described this as "a precautionary approach".

In April 2023, Swim England announced that only those "who have declared a birth sex of female" may compete in the female sport. This followed a 2022 decision by the international swimming body FINA, World Aquatics, which issued guidelines that prevent trans women competing in female categories if they experienced male puberty "beyond Tanner Stage 2 or before age 12, whichever is later".

The Lawn Tennis Association announced in December 2024 that from 25 January, "transgender women, who were recorded male at birth, would not be eligible to compete in female events in higher graded competitions". In August 2026, the policy was updated to apply to all "structured competition", including club championships and any sex-categorised event with a competitive consequence, with effect from 1 September 2026.

In July 2022, the British Triathlon announced that athletes above the age of 12 could compete in either a Female category or an Open category, with the female category only for those who were of the "female sex at birth". This was a reversal of an earlier 2018 policy which allowed for trans inclusion once certain hormonal prerequisites had been met. British Triathlon Chief Executive Andy Salmon was reported as stating that he was not "aware" of any elite-level trans athletes competing in triathlons in Britain, but did not want the governing body to wait for "that to be a problem" before it "tried to fix it".

== Single-sex facilities ==
On 16 April 2025, the Supreme Court of the United Kingdom ruled that with regards to the Equality Act 2010, the terms man, woman, and sex were always intended to refer to biological sex, and not gender or gender identity, and that, for the purposes of this Act, a transgender woman is legally male and that a transgender man is legally female, regardless of whether they have a gender recognition certificate. The then Minister for Women and Equalities, Bridget Phillipson, had stated in response that trans women should not use women's toilets. Subsequently the Equality and Human Rights Commission provided new guidance, that came into force in August 2026, stating that single-sex spaces open to the public, such as toilets, should be organised based on biological sex and that trans people should use either gender-neutral facilities or the ones that match their biological sex.

Prior to this, in May 2024, it had been announced that legislation would be introduced on gendered bathrooms and toilets in England. Schools and prisons would be exempted from the gendered legislation. In June 2024, eight female nurses sued their employer, the NHS, for allowing transgender women to use women's toilets and changing rooms. After raising their concerns, the women were directed to undergo mandatory diversity training. The NHS later reversed its order to undergo diversity training, and said "this guidance is out of date and has already been removed as new training is being developed." In October 2024, Health Secretary Wes Streeting met the women.

In December 2023, nurse Sandie Peggie and Doctor Beth Upton, a trans woman, had a verbal confrontation in the women's changing rooms at Victoria Hospital, Kirkcaldy. Peggie was accused by Upton of bullying and harassment and put on leave. Subsequently, Peggie accused NHS Fife and Upton of discrimination and harassment, because they did not provide single-sex changing facilities under the Equality Act 2010, leading to an employment tribunal. The tribunal, whose live stream attracted a global audience, heard arguments in February 2025, and resumed in July 2025.

In June 2025, the Equalities and Human Rights Commission updated its draft guidance to clarify that toilets in the workplace are covered under the Workplace (Health, Safety and Welfare) Regulations 1992, and not the Equality Act 2010; there is no obligation for employers to provide single-sex toilets, showers and changing facilities where they are in separate rooms lockable from the inside.

== Education ==
The Interim Guidance from the Equalities and Human Rights Commission - issued in April 2025 in response to the UK Supreme Court ruling that month on the meaning of sex as used in the 2010 Equality Act - stated that "Pupils who identify as trans girls (biological boys) should not be permitted to use the girls' toilet or changing facilities, and pupils who identify as trans boys (biological girls) should not be permitted to use the boys' toilet or changing facilities. Suitable alternative provisions may be required."

Following this, the Scottish Government issued revised guidance in September 2025: Supporting transgender pupils in schools: guidance for education authorities and schools – revised. While the previous guidance had said that "transgender pupils could use whatever toilets they felt most comfortable in", the updated guidance made clear that "schools must provide separate toilets for boys and girls, available on the basis of biological sex, but that schools can also provide gender neutral toilets".

Prior to this, many schools and educational institutions had adopted inclusive policies that allow students to express their gender identity freely, including the right to use chosen names, wear uniforms that aligned with their gender, and access appropriate facilities. The Department for Education encouraged schools to create safe, respectful environments for all pupils, and anti-bullying guidance specifically addresses transphobic behaviour. Numerous local authorities and academy trusts had also introduced staff training and resources to ensure that teachers are better equipped to support transgender students, contributing to greater awareness, acceptance, and inclusion within the educational system.

In December 2021, the Girls' Day School Trust, the largest network of girls' private schools in the UK, issued a blanket ban on trans girls being admitted to any of its schools. In August 2022, Attorney General Suella Braverman opined that it is lawful for schools to misgender, deadname, ban from some sports, reject from enrolment based on their trans status, and refuse any and all other forms of gender affirmation to trans children, and that to recognise their identities as trans could qualify as "indoctrinating children". In response, an open letter from parents of cisgender children emphasised that such policies could harm all students by fostering environments of intolerance and distress, with educators also expressing concern that Braverman's remarks might deter schools from supporting transgender students, potentially leading to negative mental health outcomes and diminished academic engagement.

=== Teaching of transgender topics ===
In July 2025, new education guidance was implemented regarding the teaching of transgender topics in schools in England mandating that students must carefully be taught a person's rights held on the basis of "biological sex" and how the rights of a trans person of a particular gender differ from the rights of someone assigned that gender at birth. Additionally, the guidance states that schools should not use material that oversimplifies the topic or "encourage pupils to question their gender"; "should not teach as fact that all people have a gender identity", with teaching about the concept of gender identities being banned; and should not suggest that "social transition is a simple solution" to distress.

== Transgender prisoners' rights ==
Since 2023, trans women imprisoned in England and Wales are housed in men's prisons if they have committed any violent or sexual crime, or if they have "male genitalia". In late 2023, it was announced that trans women in Scotland would only be sent to a men's prison if they were convicted of or awaiting for trial for a crime against a woman, and were considered to be a risk to women and girls. However, this was challenged in court by For Women Scotland and, in June 2026, a judge ruled that the prison guidance allowing some transgender prisoners to be held in jails matching their gender identity rather than their "sex at birth" was unlawful. In November, Scottish Prison Service deputy chief executive confirms that all transgender prisoners who identified as female were now held in men's prisons, complying with a judge's ruling in June that sex segregation in prisons must be based on biological sex rather than gender identity.

== Hate crimes ==
Two of the three legal jurisdictions in the UK - England and Wales, and Scotland - regard crimes that are motivated by transgender identity as hate crimes. Northern Ireland does not currently include transgender identity in their definition of crime motivated by hate.

According to the Home Office, in the year ending March 2024, police in England and Wales recorded 140,561 hate crimes of which 4,780 of the crimes had hatred based on transgender identity recorded as a motivating factor. This represented a fall of 2% compared to the previous year's figures. Many incidents go unreported: the Government Equalities Office's National LGBT Survey found that 88% of transgender respondents did not report the most serious incidents of hate crime they experienced, often due to concerns about being taken seriously or fear of further discrimination.

The Crown Prosecution Service (CPS) recognises hate crimes based on transgender identity and can apply for enhanced sentencing in such cases; however, challenges persist in ensuring that victims feel supported and that offenders are held accountable.

The Office for National Statistics stated that it is not possible to conclusively identify transgender victims in the existing homicide statistics because the gender of the homicide victim is determined by the police force that records the crime; however, between 2017 and 2018, the Home Office recorded 545 violent hate crimes against trans people. Research from the LGBTQ charity Stonewall has found that during that same period, 19% of trans people in the UK were victims of domestic abuse, compared to 7.9% of cis women and 4.2% of cis men. Academic research has also found an increasing trend in violence against transgender people with increased anti-transgender rhetoric in line with global trends, with hate crimes against transgender people peaking in 2023. YouGov polling in late 2025 showed 24% of trans adults reporting being subjected to physical violence in public spaces, 65% reporting receiving verbal abuse in public spaces, and 84% reporting feeling unsafe in the United Kingdom.

== Discrimination protections ==
The Sex Discrimination Act 1975 made it illegal to discriminate on the ground of sex in employment, education, and the provision of housing, goods, facilities and services. The text of the Act did not further clarify "sex" other than by defining “woman" as "a female of any age" and "man" as "a male of any age". In 1996, the judgement in the landmark case P v S and Cornwall County Council in the European Court of Justice found that the plaintiff, a trans woman who was dismissed from her post after informing her employers that she was undergoing gender reassignment, had been unlawfully dismissed because "to dismiss a person on the ground that he or she intends to undergo, or has undergone, gender reassignment is to treat him or her unfavourably by comparison with persons of the sex to which he or she was deemed to belong before that operation." The Sex Discrimination (Gender Reassignment) Regulations 1999 extended the existing Sex Discrimination Act, and made it illegal to discriminate against any person on the grounds of gender reassignment, but only in the areas of employment and vocational training.

The Equality Act 2010 officially adds "gender reassignment" as a "protected characteristic", stating: "A person has the protected characteristic of gender reassignment if the person is proposing to undergo, is undergoing or has undergone a process (or part of a process) for the purpose of reassigning the person's sex by changing physiological or other attributes of sex." This law provides protection for transgender people at work, in education, as a consumer, when using public services, when buying or renting property, or as a member or guest of a private club or association. Protection against discrimination by association with a trans person is also included. The Equality Act 2010 prohibits discrimination against people with the protected characteristic of gender reassignment in the provision of separate and single-sex services but includes an exception that service providers can use in exceptional circumstances.

Treating trans people differently is lawful for services that meet at least one of several statutory conditions as long as it is "a proportionate means of achieving a legitimate aim". In 2018, a spokesperson for the Government Equalities Office maintained that the government had no plans to amend the Equality Act 2010 either directly or indirectly, and that it planned to maintain the Equality Act's "provision for single and separate sex spaces". In addition to the basic legal protection afforded by the Equality Act 2010, the UK government has published good practice guidance on providing services that are inclusive of trans people as customers, clients, users or members.

In 2020, the court case Taylor v Jaguar Land Rover Ltd ruled that non-binary gender and genderfluid identities fall under the protected characteristic of gender reassignment in the Equality Act 2010. In July 2022, Vice News reported that the Financial Conduct Authority had planned to issue regulations which required the 58,000 businesses under its jurisdiction to allow trans people in their employ to self-declare their gender without the need for a gender recognition certificate. Vice reported that after receiving pressure from the Equality and Human Rights Commission, the FCA pivoted to a policy of requiring trans people to be referred to by the sex on their birth certificate, unless they have a gender recognition certificate, which only 1% of trans people in the UK possess. Following the corresponding backlash from LGBTQ employees within the FCA, all proposed policy changes were scrapped in their entirety.

=== Conversion therapy ===
On 31 March 2022, a Downing Street briefing paper leaked to ITV News showed that the government had planned to drop proposed legislation banning conversion therapy, following an announcement that ministers would explore non-legislative methods of handling the practice. The legislation would have included a ban on conversion therapy for transgender people. Within hours of the leaks, a senior government source stated that the legislation would be introduced in the Queen's Speech in May, and that plans to drop the legislation had been shelved following backlash within the Conservative Party and from media outlets. However, in a change from the originally announced plans to ban conversion therapy, the legislation would not criminalise conversion therapy against transgender people.

In response, at least 120 LGBTQ groups pulled out of the UK's planned first-ever Safe To Be Me conference on LGBTQ issues. In July 2022, when gay MP Peter Gibson resigned as Parliamentary Private Secretary in the Department for International Trade in protest at Boris Johnson's conduct in the Chris Pincher scandal, his resignation letter expressed disappointment about "the damage our party has inflicted on itself over the failure to include trans people in the ban on conversion therapy". Fellow gay MP and PPS Mike Freer mentioned in his resignation letter that he felt the government was "creating an atmosphere of hostility for LGBT+ people".

== Marriage ==
=== Corbett v Corbett ===
The legal case of Corbett v Corbett, heard in November and December 1969 with a February 1971 decision, set a legal precedent regarding the status of transsexual people in the United Kingdom. It was brought at a time when the UK did not recognise mutual consent as reason enough to dissolve a marriage. Arthur Corbett, the plaintiff, sought a method of dissolving his marriage to the model April Ashley, who had brought a petition under the Matrimonial Causes Act 1965 for maintenance. As a result of Justice Roger Ormrod's decision, the marriage was deemed void, and an unofficial correcting of birth certificates for transsexual and intersex people ceased. In the 1980s and 1990s, the pressure group Press for Change campaigned in support for transgender and transsexual people to be allowed to marry, and helped take several cases to the European Court of Human Rights. In Rees v. United Kingdom (1986), the court decided that the UK was not violating any human rights.

=== Situation since the Gender Recognition Act 2004 ===
Between the Gender Recognition Act 2004 and The Marriage (Same-Sex Couples) Act 2013, transgender people who were married had been required to divorce or annul their marriage in order for them to be issued a Gender Recognition Certificate (GRC). The Civil Partnership Act 2004 allowed the creation of civil partnerships between same-sex couples, but a married couple that included a transgender partner could not simply re-register their new status. They first had to have their marriage dissolved, gain legal recognition of the new gender and then register for a civil partnership.

With the legalisation of same-sex marriage in England and Wales, existing marriages will continue where one or both parties change their legal gender and both parties wish to remain married. However, civil partnerships continue where only both parties change their legal gender simultaneously and wish to remain in their civil partnership. In other cases, they must be converted into marriages to continue. This restriction remains as, effectively, it would legalise a small category of opposite-sex civil partnerships. The legislation also does not restore any of the marriages of transgender people that were forcibly annulled as a precondition for them securing a GRC. If the spouse does not consent, the marriage must be terminated before a GRC may be issued. Scottish same-sex marriage law does not allow a person to veto their spouse's gender recognition in this manner.

== Legality of sex without disclosure of trans status ==
Under McNally v R, a 2013 legal precedent in England and Wales concerning the case of an underage gender non-conforming person having sex with a girl, consensual sexual intercourse in which both parties are not aware of each other's trans status or lack thereof can be prosecuted as rape by gender fraud. In 2016, a trans man was likewise convicted of sexual assault for having ‘consensual’ sex without disclosing his trans status, on the basis consent would not have been given had the partner known. A legal scholar, Alex Sharpe, said that the interpretation of law regarding the prosecution and conviction of his case is based on limited understanding of gender identity by a small set of people, stating "the coercive power of law is being used to endorse the views of some cisgender people concerning the definition of something so personal as gender identity".

Prosecutions regarding non-disclosure of gender history is brought almost exclusively against transgender people. There have been at least ten prosecutions since 2012 and all of the defendants were convicted, while some of the convictions were solely based on the non-disclosure of gender history per se. Discussing the cis- and hetero-normativity which she argued existed in the UK judicial system, Sharpe said that despite the fact "in many of the prosecuted cases, prosecutors, courts, and juries appear to have suspended disbelief concerning complainant testimony to a quite extraordinary degree" regarding the consistency of the perception of gender towards the defendant, the defendants were convicted in all the cases.

In 2022, Crown Prosecution Service (CPS) proposed an update on the prosecution guidance regarding rape charges and held a public consultation. Sharpe argues that while the proposal might introduce the better balance of human rights between the trans suspects and the complaints as before, CPS is still making policies via hetero- and cis-normative lenses nonetheless. In December 2024, CPS updated the prosecution guidance with numerous revisions to the initial proposal. CPS clarifies that "there is no difference between a deliberate deception about birth sex and a failure to disclose birth sex." although "Not every situation where a trans or non-binary person fails to disclose their sex will involve a criminal offence". Also, CPS "clarifies that a suspect may deceive a complainant as to their birth sex if they choose not to disclose their sex or trans identity."

== Claims of police impartiality ==
In July 2025, a High Court judge ruled that the Chief Constable of the Northumbria Police had breached her duty of impartiality by carrying a pride flag at a pride parade that had transgender colours on it.

== Scotland ==
=== Discrimination protections in Scotland ===
The Equality Act 2006 introduced the Gender Equality Duty in Scotland, which made public bodies obliged to take seriously the threat of harassment or discrimination against transsexual people in various situations. In 2008, the Sex Discrimination (Amendment of Legislation) Regulations extended existing regulation to outlaw discrimination when providing goods or services to transsexual people. The definition of "transsexual" used in the Gender Equality Duty is still technically the same as that in the Sexual Discrimination Act; however, this legislation was meant to prevent discrimination against all transgender people.

Some transgender rights activists, such as Transgender Equality & Rights in Scotland, advocate adding the category of "gender identity", "in order to be more clearly inclusive of those transgender people who do not identify as transsexual and do not intend to change the gender in which they live". They also want to introduce measures that would clarify protections from discrimination in education, certain kinds of employment, and medical insurance.

=== Gender recognition in Scotland ===
In March 2022, a bill was formally introduced in the Scottish Parliament which would reform the Gender Recognition Act implemented by the Parliament of the United Kingdom in 2004. If enacted, this bill would make it easier for trans people in Scotland to change their legally recognised gender by changing the process of applying for a Gender Recognition Certificate. Under the changes, applicants would no longer need to prove having lived for two years as their acquired gender or obtain a gender dysphoria diagnosis. Instead, they would be required to swear under oath that they intend to remain permanently in their acquired gender. In addition, applications would be handled by the Registrar General for Scotland, instead of a UK-wide gender recognition panel. The UK Government ruled out implementing similar changes in England and Wales.

In December 2022, the Gender Recognition Reform (Scotland) Bill was passed by the Scottish Parliament by a vote of 86-39 and is awaiting royal assent. In response, Prime Minister Rishi Sunak suggested that the UK would, for the first time in its history, invoke Section 35 of the Scotland Act 1998 to veto the law, over concerns for "women's and children's safety". On 9 January 2023, Equalities Minister Kemi Badenoch, stated that gender recognition certificates, and associated government documents granted to trans people in Scotland, would no longer be recognised in England and Wales, and that the British government would review the gender recognition processes of other countries to determine whether or not to implement similar policies regarding their documents. Critics described this action as a "trans travel ban", with some quoted as saying "the UK government sees trans people as a threat to be contained, not citizens to be respected". A Cabinet Office spokesperson responded by saying that trans people "have not and will not be banned" from entering the UK.

On 16 January 2023, the UK Government invoked Section 35 of the Scotland Act for the first time and blocked the new law from taking effect, an action that raised questions regarding Scottish devolution. Although the UK's Scottish Secretary, Alister Jack, said they still respect Scottish devolution, the Scottish National Party described the decision to block as "an unprecedented attack" on Scottish self-governance, with party leader and First Minister Nicola Sturgeon saying they would "vigorously defend this legislation" in court.

== Public attitudes ==
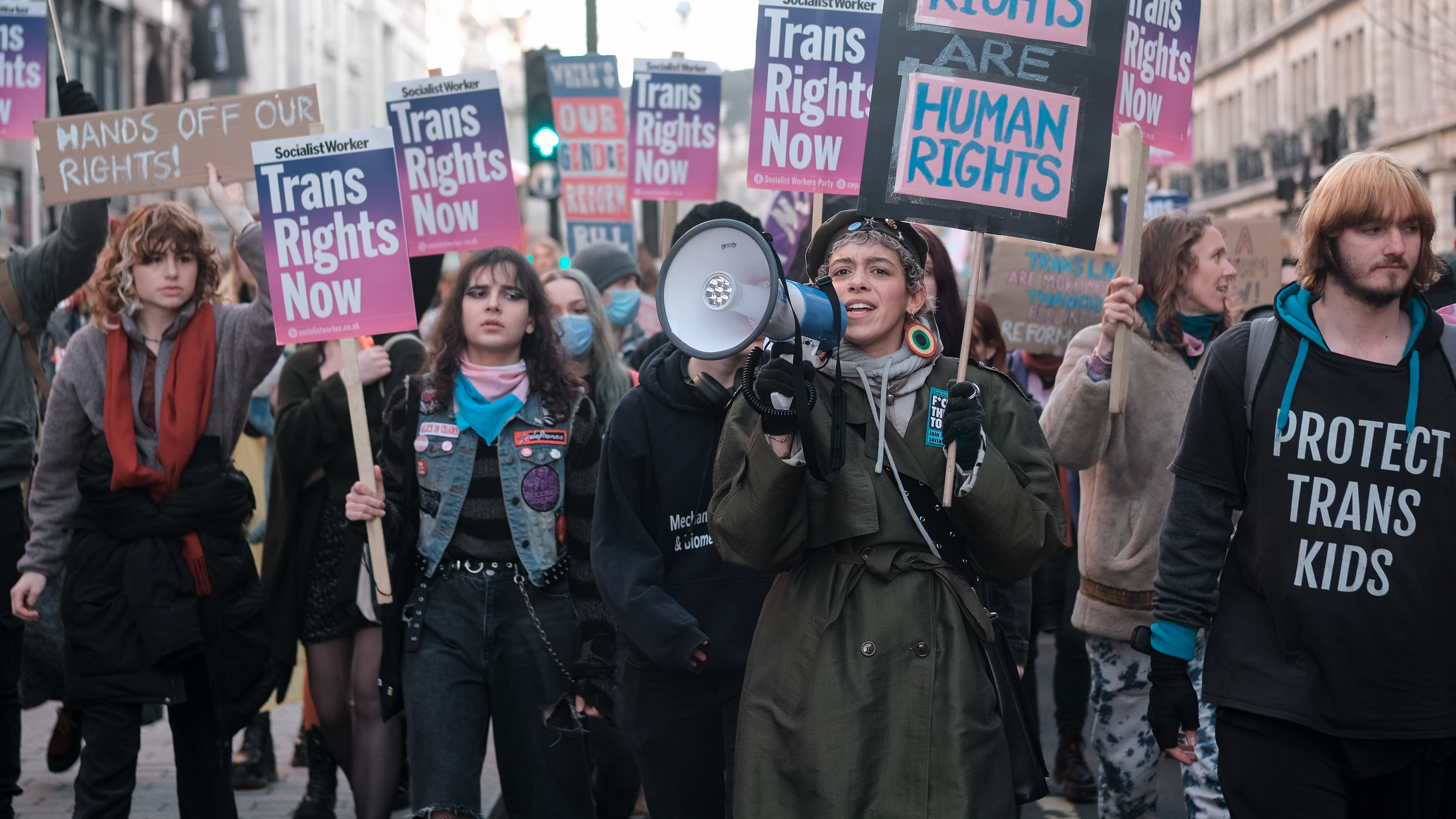
Protest in London in January 2023 using the slogan "Trans rights are human rights"

Transgender people in the UK continue to face significant challenges alongside barriers to healthcare, including discrimination and prejudice, increased media focus, and widespread opposition to their rights.

On 9 July 2022, Vogue reported that over 20,000 people marched in London to support trans rights. On 16 July, PinkNews reported that over 20,000 people marched in Brighton for the same cause. On 29 July 2024, a confirmed 55,000 to 60,000+ people attended London Trans+ Pride 2024, making it the biggest trans pride march in the world. On 26 July 2025, 100,000+ people attended London Trans+ Pride 2025, beating out the previous year's event as the biggest trans pride march in the world. A year later in July 2026, an estimated 150,000 people attended London Trans+ Pride 2026, beating the previous year's record as the biggest trans pride march in the world again.

Christine Burns, author of Trans Britain: Our Journey from the Shadows, stated in a CNN article that The Times and The Sunday Times newspapers published "six trans related pieces in 2016" but "over 150 in 2017 and similarly each year since". In evidence given to the Edinburgh Employment Tribunal in 2019, Burns said that during 2016, both The Times and Sunday Times began to publish a larger number of trans-related stories, and by 2017 had "uniquely" published "over 130" trans-related items, which she described as a "trans backlash" stemming from 2015. In December 2020, the Independent Press Standards Organisation released a report stating that the average number of UK media stories about trans rights had jumped 414% between May 2014 and May 2019, from 34 per month to 176 per month, and that in the preceding year of research that number had risen to 224 stories per month.

In February 2023, an article by NBC News on the murder of Brianna Ghey said: "the climate in the U.K. has grown increasingly hostile for trans people over the last few years". In a 2023 analysis by Transgender Europe studying the policies that affect transgender people in 49 European and Central Asian countries, the UK earned 14 points out of a score of 30, making the UK "one of the Worst Places in Europe to be trans".

=== Surveys and opinion polls ===
A report on "Attitudes to transgender people" commissioned by the Equality and Human Rights Commission, published in 2020, found that 84% of the British public described themselves as "not prejudiced at all" towards transgender people and 76% believed that prejudice against transgender people was "always or mostly wrong". Stonewall said the "common anti-trans narratives" do not reflect public opinion. A 2020 survey highlighted a generation gap, and found that 56% of Generation Z (ages 18 to 24) believed that transgender rights have not gone far enough, compared to only 20% of baby boomers (ages 55 to 75). Similarly, a YouGov survey found that 57 per cent of women believed that trans people should be able to self-identify as their chosen gender; the survey also found that 70% of Labour voters supported self-identification, while only 13% opposed it; furthermore the study found that support for trans rights was most profound in urban areas, with only 14% in London opposed. A study entitled "The 'fault lines' in the UK's culture wars" found that people who opposed trans rights were more likely to rely on incorrect information.

A 2018 survey of 1,000 UK employers found that 33% reported themselves as "less likely" to hire a trans person, and only 9% believed trans people should be protected from employment discrimination. In mid-2022, More in Common and YouGov both published in-depth studies on public attitudes to trans rights; The Guardian said that the former study was "[t]hought to be the most in-depth UK study" on the subject. Both studies found that despite the polarised discourse on trans rights in politics and on social media, most Britons do not have strong opinions on the matter. YouGov noted that when asked 23 questions about trans rights, very few respondents would always choose the most or least permissive option each time. Attitudes to the questions varied; the surveys found broad support for the inclusion of trans people in society but also opposition to medical transitioning for under-18s and especially to trans women participating in women's sport. YouGov found the public split on whether the NHS should provide hormone therapy, with a slightly greater plurality opposing it for surgeries. On some questions about whether a trans person could access a single-sex space, like toilets and prisons, the view varied depending on whether or not the trans person had undergone reassignment surgery. Younger age groups and knowing a transgender person correlated with more permissive attitudes (and with each other).

YouGov found "an overall gradual erosion in support towards transgender rights". In 2018, 43% of Brits surveyed agreed that trans women are women, compared to 38% in 2022. 61% of Brits surveyed stated they were against trans women in women's sports, compared to 48% in 2018. Likewise, the number of people believing there is no risk in allowing trans women to use women's facilities fell from 43% to 32%. Sasha Misra, associate director of Communications for Stonewall, stated in response that "a dip in public support on some trans issues is only to be expected, given the excessive and incendiary level of coverage we have seen in the media over the last few years". On the other hand, the number believing that a doctor's permission should be required for legal recognition of a gender change decreased from 65% to 60%.

A June 2023 poll by Ipsos into worldwide attitudes to LGBTQ rights found that while most Britons support the protection of transgender people from discrimination in the fields of access to housing and employment, the level of support in Britain for allowing trans people access to single-sex spaces and for gender-affirming healthcare was amongst the lowest of the thirty countries studied. An August 2023 poll by YouGov found that 39% of the British population reported holding positive views of trans people, compared to 65% of cis queer men, 84% of cis queer women, and 80% of trans people themselves holding such views. A 2025 survey by Ipsos found that 30% of Britons believe trans people should be allowed to use facilities matching their gender identity, the lowest of 23 countries surveyed, along with 37% supporting youth access to gender-affirming care (22nd out of 23), and 15% supporting transgender athletes competing based on their gender identity (21st out of 23). Surveying by YouGov in 2024 and 2025 found that inline with an increase in the Anti-gender movement, there has been a decrease in support of transgender people observed in polling since 2020.

=== Transphobia and "TERF Island" debate ===
Sociologists Anna McLean and Paul B. Stretesky argue that "a veritable miasma of anti-trans campaign groups ... united in their antipathy toward transgender people" has contributed to an anti-trans moral panic in the United Kingdom, which they link to authoritarian beliefs. Criminologist Sarah Lamble, researcher Claire House, and sociologist Sally Hines show that a reinforcing partnership between anti-transgender feminists and right-wing and far-right actors has formed since the 2010s, which has mobilised a core of activists to roll back rights and protections granted to transgender people in the UK. Political scientist Craig McLean similarly identifies a small core of activists who have worked to radicalise the electorate against transgender people. The UK-wide public consultation on reforming the process of obtaining a Gender Recognition Certificate, launched by the government of Theresa May in 2018, has led to a "toxic culture war" according to CNN.

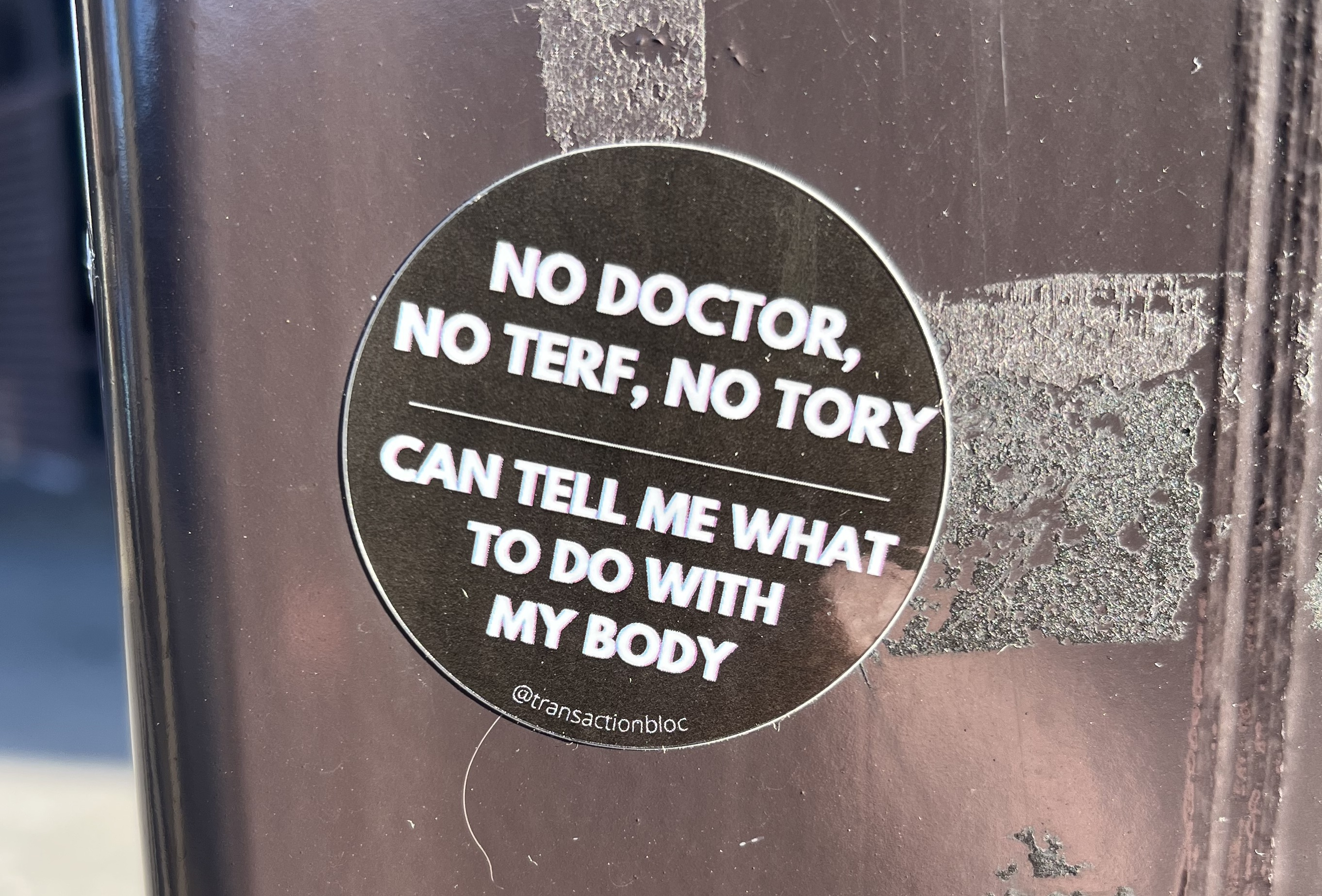
Anti-transphobia sticker in London in January 2023

Several commentators have described the level of transphobia in British society in general (including the negative coverage of trans-related issues in the media) and the support for trans-exclusionary radical feminism (TERF) in particular as unusual compared to other Western countries, and the discourse on transgender-related issues in the United Kingdom has been called a "TERF war". This state of affairs has led to the moniker "TERF Island" being used in some circles to refer to the UK.

Lisa Tilley described the British media as playing a large role in advancing a transphobic agenda to demonise transgender people, and that "the effects are to make the UK one of the most transphobic countries in the world". Drawing on the theory of radicalisation, Craig McLean argues that discourse on transgender-related issues in the UK has been radicalised in response to the activities of new lobby groups that push "a radical agenda to deny the basic rights of trans people ... under the cover of "free speech'". Finn Mackay argued that "during the pandemic, the ceaseless attacks on and lies told about trans people in our media have only increased ... the fact that our media is awash with conspiracy theories about trans lives ... should be a national shame."

In a report on "hate against LGBTI people in Europe" published in 2021, the Council of Europe criticised "the extensive and often virulent attacks on the rights of LGBTI people for several years" in the United Kingdom along with Hungary, Poland, Russia, and Turkey. The report further summarised that such attacks "deliberately mischaracterise the fight for the equality of LGBTI people as so-called 'gender ideology' and seek to stifle the identities and realities of all those who challenge the social constructs that perpetuate gender inequalities and gender-based violence in our societies". The report described anti-trans rhetoric in the United Kingdom as having gained "baseless and concerning credibility, at the expense of both trans people's civil liberties and women's and children's rights", citing an increase in anti-trans hate crimes since 2015 and statements made at the 2021 IDAHOT forum by Minister of Equalities, Kemi Badenoch. The report also highlighted anti-LGBTQ hate speech on social media.

In October 2021, CNN published an article that accused UK media of promoting anti-transgender views. The article accused the BBC, Sky News, and GB News of pushing transphobia and using slurs against transgender people. In the article, Lisa Tilley, a political economist from the University of London, said: "The media shamefully advances this transphobic frontier, with both the right-wing press and ostensibly leftist outlets." In November 2021, the physician and LGBTQ rights activist Adrian Harrop was forced to attend a tribunal held by the Department of Health's Medical Practitioners Tribunal Service to determine his fitness to continue practising medicine, after he made several tweets in support of trans rights. Vice News reported: "One of the tweets deemed 'highly offensive' by the tribunal involved Harrop calling a woman who vocally opposes trans rights 'a venomous transphobic bigot', whose aim was to 'demonise trans people' while 'excluding them from public life'." The MPTS ultimately handed down a one-month suspension for Harrop's tweets, stating in its ruling: "Harrop's actions in posting inappropriate tweets over a sustained period of time, in contradiction to the advice he was given, breached fundamental tenets of the profession. His actions brought the profession into disrepute, undermining public confidence in the profession and the standards of conduct expected from members of the profession."

In June 2022, it was announced that Stephanie Davies-Arai, founder of the group anti-transgender advocacy group Transgender Trend, would receive the British Empire Medal from Queen Elizabeth II. In July 2022, MP Joanna Cherry was elected chair of the Joint Committee on Human Rights. PinkNews reported that Cherry supports the LGB Alliance (created in opposition to Stonewall after they began to campaign for transgender equality). Professor Stephen Whittle OBE of Manchester Metropolitan University was quoted describing Cherry as having "antagonism to trans people's privacy rights as clarified by the European Courts", and characterised the development as "an incalculable loss to justice and parliament's role in protecting the UK's minorities". In October 2022, the Home Office reported that between 2021 and 2022, hate crimes against trans people increased by 56%, which it linked to growing hostility on social media.

=== Controversy in universities ===
The issue of transgender rights has sparked controversy and debate in UK universities, raising questions about the limits and scope of academic freedom and expression. At several British universities, student bodies have sought to ban trans-exclusionary radical feminists from appearing as speakers. In 2015 the University of Manchester Students' Union banned Julie Bindel from speaking at the university over concerns that her views would "incite hatred". In 2018 the University of Bristol Students' Union (Bristol SU) adopted a motion that banned trans-exclusionary radical feminists (TERFs) from appearing as speakers at Bristol SU events and that called upon the university to adopt the same policy. The motion said the TERF ban was necessary because TERF activity on the university campus "put[s] trans students' safety at risk ... in direct violation of the aims outlined in the Code of Conduct".

In June 2019, a group of 30 academics, in a public letter to The Sunday Times, said that universities paying for LGBTQ diversity training by Stonewall stifled academic debate because "tendentious and anti-scientific claims are presented . . . as objective fact". Subsequently, Selina Todd, who had signed the letter, was no platformed at a celebration in Oxford, which she had helped organise, of the 50th anniversary of the National Women's Liberation Conference of 1970. An invitation to speak, which had been accepted by Todd, was withdrawn on the eve of the event. In both December 2022 and April 2023, attempts to show the 2022 film Adult Human Female at the University of Edinburgh were cancelled because protestors blocked access. The documentary says it is the first "to look at the clash between women's rights and trans ideology". It has been criticised as transphobic. Its title is a phrase associated with gender-critical feminism.

In May 2023, ahead of a planned appearance by gender-critical philosopher Kathleen Stock at the Oxford Union, letters for and against her participation were signed by groups of academics and staff of Oxford University. In September 2023, Oxford University Press withdrew from its agreement with philosopher Alex Byrne of the Massachusetts Institute of Technology to publish his book Trouble with Gender: Sex Facts, Gender Fictions. The publisher said the book did not cover its subject in "a sufficiently serious or respectful way". The author told The Times that OUP had withdrawn because the book critically analysed gender identity. In December 2024, The Daily Telegraph reported that undergraduate Connie Shaw was barred by Leeds University Union from overseeing programmes including LGBTQ+ Hour on Leeds Student Radio because of her gender-critical beliefs and posting articles on anti-transgender blogs.

=== Media coverage ===
British media has been accused of bigotry towards transgender people, a lack of transgender voices and perspectives in the British media landscape, and publications that "sensationalise rather than humanise" trans people. Tara John, a senior writer for American broadcaster CNN, stated in October 2021 that "Anti-trans rhetoric is rife in the British media". Coverage of transgender related topics covered by The Daily Mail have been found to have increased by 1,817% between January 2013 and January 2023, with 100 out of the 115 Daily Mail articles in January 2023 (equating to 87%) being categorised as negative, whereas none of its articles related to transgender topics were in January 2013.

From 2016, The Times started to publish "anti-trans news reports and columns every few days" according to PinkNews, which they state was then followed by The Daily Mail, The Daily Telegraph, The Guardian, The Daily Express, The Sun, The Spectator, The New Statesman and BBC News. PinkNews notes this transphobia has come in multiple forms, one of which has been the false assumption that self-ID laws would increase the rate of sexual assaults, an assumption which has been unfounded in the multiple countries where this has been in place; countries of which make up between 1.5 and 2 billion of the total world population. British journalist Janice Turner was awarded for her comment journalism in December 2018, despite being criticised by LGBTQ campaigners, the trans community, and openly gay MP Stephen Doughty for "whipping up inflammatory prejudice against transgender people".

==== BBC coverage ====
The BBC, the United Kingdom's public broadcaster, has frequently drawn criticism from both pro-transgender activist groups and British politicians for its reporting on and policies towards trans issues. In December 2020, the head of the UK media regulator Ofcom issued a condemnation of the BBC for balancing appearances by transgender people with activists from gender-critical groups, calling it "extremely inappropriate".

In October 2021, the BBC published the article "We're being pressured into sex by some trans women", written by Caroline Lowbridge. It was produced by BBC Nottingham, a branch of BBC English Regions. The article claims that lesbians are being pressured by transgender women into having sex with them. The article received widespread criticism among the LGBTQ community as transphobic. It drew particular attention for the inclusion of comments from former American female pornographic actress Lily Cade, who wrote a blog post after the article's publication calling for the "lynching" of trans women. Cade's comments were subsequently removed from the article.

Trans Activism UK, Trans Media Watch and at least one senior employee of Mermaids were critical of the article; an open letter with 20,000 signatories asked for the BBC to apologise. The Guardian and The Times reported that the article was met with backlash by BBC staff, including prior to its publication, while protests took place outside BBC offices. Criticisms centred on the inclusion of a Twitter poll from the anti-transgender group Get the L Out that reported 56% of 80 self-selected lesbians had "felt pressured to take a 'transwoman' as a sexual partner". Critics also believed that Lowbridge's chosen interviewees had a narrow range of viewpoints. A Stonewall executive is quoted on the subject, as is the co-founder of the LGB Alliance, which was created in opposition to Stonewall after they began to campaign for transgender equality.

In November 2021, the BBC announced it was pulling out of Stonewall's diversity scheme, citing a need to remain impartial. In 2023, the BBC sent a nine page document to all of its news presenters entitled "reporting sex and gender", in which it was stated that any time an accusation of transphobia was made, the presenter was required to challenge that accusation, and advising them that the term cisgender may be considered offensive.

=== Equality and Human Rights Commission ===
In April 2021, the Equality and Human Rights Commission submitted evidence backing Maya Forstater in Forstater v Center for Global Development Europe, wherein Forstater sued her employer, the Center for Global Development Europe, for not having her employment contract renewed after expressing gender-critical beliefs. PinkNews reported that the EHRC issued a statement saying "We think that a 'gender critical' belief that 'trans women are men and trans men are women' is a philosophical belief which is protected under the Equality Act". In May 2021, the EHRC withdrew itself from Stonewall's diversity champions scheme. In December 2021, barrister Akua Reindorf was appointed to the EHRC board of commissioners by Liz Truss.

In January 2022, the EHRC released dual statements opposing the removal of administrative barriers for trans people to receive legal recognition in Scotland, and asking that England and Wales' ban on conversion therapy not include trans people. In February 2022, Vice News reported that it had been leaked sections of an unpublished EHRC guidance pack dating to late 2021, which advised businesses and organisations to exclude transgender people from single-sex spaces - including toilets, hospital wards, and changing rooms - unless they held a Gender Recognition Certificate (GRC). Vice reported that the guidance, which had been due to be released in January 2022, but had not been published as of February 2022, was aimed at "[protecting] women", and that just 1% of trans people in the UK held a GRC.

In May 2023, a United Nations investigation found that the EHRC had deliberately acted with the objective to reduce human rights protections for transgender women. In July 2024, the EHRC released guidance clarifying that sex-based occupational requirements included sex as modified by a GRC, but that under schedule 9 of the Equality Act 2010 employers were permitted to exclude transgender persons even with a GRC. The guidance stated that the basis and reasons for any occupational restrictions should be clearly stated in any advertisement.

=== Grooming conspiracy theory ===
In 2020, comedy writer and anti-transgender activist Graham Linehan was banned from Twitter after beginning to use "OK groomer" as an attack against those who criticised his activism. The term was also picked by pressure group Transgender Trend, which used it in material that it sent to schools to oppose advice given by LGBTQ charities such as Stonewall. In March 2020, The Times columnist Janice Turner accused the charity Mermaids, which offers support for trans youth, of child grooming for introducing an exit button on its website in response to the COVID-19 pandemic lockdown. The "grooming" accusation has also been used by the far right in the UK, including Tommy Robinson.

== See also ==
- Anti-transgender movement in the United Kingdom
- Intersex rights in the United Kingdom
- Labour for Trans Rights
- Legal status of transgender people
- LGBT+ Liberal Democrats
- LGBTQ rights in the United Kingdom
- Transgender history in the United Kingdom
