= Rape by deception =

Perpetrator obtains the victim's agreement by deception

Rape by deception, or rape by fraud, is a situation in which the perpetrator deceives the victim into participating in a sexual act to which they would otherwise not have consented, had they not been deceived. Deception can occur in many forms, such as illusory perceptions, false statements, and false actions.

== Notable cases ==
=== United Kingdom ===
In English law, the Court of Appeal in R v Linekar [1995] 3 All ER 69 73 ruled that the basis for such claims is "very narrow", ruling that refusing to pay for sexual services was fraud, not rape. Cases demonstrating the law on consent as set out in the Sexual Offences Act 2003 include R v Assange (aka Assange v Swedish Prosecution Authority) (Note: R v Assange in this instance should not be confused with a 1996 Australian case by that name relating to unauthorized computer use.) (if consent was conditional on the use of the condom during intercourse, and the condition was deliberately disregarded, that was capable of amounting to rape), R(F) v DPP (the sexual act was performed in a way that broke a condition agreed previously), and R v McNally (deceit as to gender).

In 2024, this was formally expanded so that transgender people who failed to disclose their transgender status of a sexual partner whether deliberately or not could be charged with rape.

Four notable cases where this issue arose:

- The 2011 UK undercover policing relationships scandal, in which police officers obtained sex by deceiving as to their identity, as part of their duties. Crown Prosecutors declined to prosecute on the basis that legally, the actions would not constitute rape as consent to the act itself was informed and the grounds for rape by deceit as to identity was extremely limited.
- In November 2015, British judge Roger Dutton sentenced a 25-year-old woman, Gayle Newland, to eight years in prison for pretending to be a man as a means of having sex with an unnamed woman of the same age. Newland had made her female victim believe that she was a man by means of deception and used the deception in order to have sex with her on more than 10 occasions, using a dildo. Newland's victim was shocked to discover that her "boyfriend" was in reality female. Newland was granted a new trial in October 2016 on the grounds that Judge Dutton had given a prejudicial summation. She was convicted again and was sentenced to six-and-a-half years imprisonment on 20 July 2017.
- In September 2019, serial rapist Jason Lawrance appealed against one of his convictions, in which he had told a victim, prior to having sex with her, that he had had a vasectomy, but admitted afterwards that this was untrue. The conviction for rape by deception was reported to be the first of its kind in the UK. In July 2020, the Court of Appeal ruled that deceit as to fertility does not vitiate consent to sex, and quashed Lawrance's conviction.
- On 10 October 2025, Ciara Watkin, a transgender woman in England who claimed to be on her period to avoid revealing her transgender status to a male heterosexual partner, was sentenced to 21 months in prison for sexual assault.

=== United States ===
==== Massachusetts ====
In 2008, it was reported that a Massachusetts woman unknowingly had sex with her boyfriend's brother in the dark basement that she was sleeping in. He could not be prosecuted because Massachusetts law requires that rape include the use of force. Massachusetts State House Representative Peter Koutoujian crafted rape-by-fraud legislation in response.

==== California ====
On March 30, 1984, Daniel Kayton Boro called a Holiday Inn in South San Francisco. Mariana De Bella was a hotel clerk who answered the phone that morning. Boro told De Bella that he was "Dr. Stevens" and that he worked at Peninsula Hospital. Boro (pretending to be "Dr. Stevens") said that he had the results of her blood test and that she had contracted a dangerous, extremely infectious and possibly deadly disease from using public toilets. Boro went on to tell her that she could be sued for spreading the disease and that she had only two options for treatment. The first option he told her about was an extremely painful surgical procedure (which he described in graphic detail) that would cost $9,000 and require a six-week hospital stay that would not be covered by insurance. The second option, Boro said, was to have sexual intercourse with an anonymous "donor" who would administer a vaccine through sexual intercourse with her. The clerk agreed to the sexual intercourse and arranged to pay $1,000 for it, believing it was the only choice she had.

Boro instructed her to check into a hotel room and call him when she was there. Boro then arrived at her room as the "donor". He told her to relax and then had sex with De Bella. Boro used no physical force and his victim knowingly allowed him to have sex with her because she believed (falsely) that her life was threatened if she did not receive this "treatment".

Boro was arrested at the hotel shortly after when the police arrived after being called by the victim's work supervisor. He was charged with rape, burglary, and grand larceny under various California statutes and convicted at trial. However, his conviction for rape was later overturned by the California Court on the grounds that California lacked a law against fraudulently inducing someone into sexual intercourse. His convictions for grand larceny and burglary were not overturned, however, because he fraudulently took $1,000 from his victim.

The California Legislature subsequently amended the rape statute in 1986 to include that a rape does in fact occur when a victim is not aware of the essential characteristics of the act (the sexual intercourse) due to the perpetrator's fraudulent representation that the sexual act served a professional purpose.

Boro was arrested again for the same scheme three years later. This time he was convicted of rape under the revised California statute. It is believed that Boro used this scheme to rape dozens of women over many years.

In Norwalk, California, on February 20, 2009, Julio Morales snuck into a sleeping 18-year-old woman's darkened bedroom after he saw her boyfriend leave. The woman said she awoke to the sensation of someone having sex with her and assumed it was her boyfriend. When a ray of light hit Morales's face, and the woman saw he was not her boyfriend, she fought back and Morales fled. The woman called her boyfriend, who then called the police.

Julio Morales was convicted of rape under two concepts. He was guilty of rape because he began having sex with the woman while she was still asleep and, therefore, unable to consent. He was also guilty of rape-by-fraud because he had impersonated the woman's boyfriend in order to gain her consent. However, an appellate court ruled that the lower court had misread the 1872 law criminalizing rape-by-fraud. The law stated a man is guilty of rape-by-fraud if he impersonates a woman's husband in order to get her consent. The woman in this case was not married, and Morales had impersonated her boyfriend, not her husband. Because of this one technicality, the appellate court overturned Morales' rape-by-trickery conviction in People v. Morales in 2013.

To close this loophole in California's rape-by-fraud law, Assemblyman Katcho Achadjian (R-San Luis Obispo) – who tried to introduce a similar bill in 2011 – introduced Assembly Bill 65 and Senator Noreen Evans (D-Santa Rosa) introduced Senate Bill 59. The two bills quickly passed both houses without one dissenting vote and were signed into law by Governor Jerry Brown on September 9, 2013. Morales was later re-tried on the basis that the woman was asleep and re-convicted to three years in a state prison, which he had already served. He was also required to register as a sex offender for the remainder of his life.

=== Israel ===
A legal precedent in Israel classifying sex by deception as rape was set by the Supreme Court in a 2008 conviction of a man who posed as a government official and persuaded women to have sex with him by promising them state benefits. Another man, Eran Ben-Avraham, was convicted of fraud after having told a woman he was a neurosurgeon before she had sex with him.

==== 2010 case ====
In 2010, a conviction of rape by deception drew international attention when it was first reported that a man deceived a woman into consensual sex within ten minutes of their first meeting by, according to the amended indictment, lying about being Jewish, unmarried, and interested in a long-term relationship. In later interviews, the man later denied the allegations that he lied, but such denials were not mentioned in his plea bargain. However, it was later reported that the charge had actually been the result of a plea bargain with the defendant in what had originally been a rape-by-force case where the records were sealed by the judge to protect the identity of the victim and avoid the cross-examination of her. The sex was consensual according to one of the judges. The man was represented by the public defender's office, and the woman by the prosecution. Sabbar Kashur, an Israeli Arab Muslim resident of Jerusalem who was married with two children, accepted a plea bargain and an 18-month sentence on the reduced charge of rape by deception in 2010 after a period of incarceration and house arrest.

Details later declassified showed that the initial charge was of violent rape, but the prosecution agreed to the reduced charge of rape by deception because of the victim's confused account and concern at facing another court appearance. They also indicated that the woman was emotionally disturbed and had a history of sexual abuse. The court sent the victim to a mental hospital for treatment and convicted Kashur on the lesser charge. Prosecutors agreed to the plea bargain in order to spare the woman a long cross-examination that might undermine her evidence. The public defender appealed the sentence to the Supreme Court, which postponed the sentence pending the appeal and freed Kashur from house arrest. In 2012, the sentence was cut to 9 months by the Supreme Court.

== Transgender individuals ==
According to an article by University of Alberta Law faculty member Florence Ashley, there is much debate surrounding the topic of transgender people who have sex with partners who are unaware of their trans identity, and whether this is categorized as rape by deception. Ashley writes one side argues that if a transgender person hides their biological sex from a person who would otherwise revoke consent if they knew of their trans identity, it fits the definition of rape by deception in countries like the United Kingdom and Israel. Ashley characterizes counter arguments as "focused on the realness of trans people's genders: since trans men are men and trans women are women, it is not misleading for them to present as they do". Ashley argues there is a lack of malicious intent to deceive in these encounters.

In "Queering Judgement: The Case of Gender Identity Fraud", legal theorist Alex Sharpe suggests that an obligation to disclose undermines the privacy rights of transgender and gender non-conforming people.

According to transgender activist Sophie Cook, transgender people in the United Kingdom could face rape charges under section 2 of the Sexual Offences Act 2003 if they fail to disclose their gender history to their sexual partners. The Crown Prosecution Service stated that it would not automatically prosecute transgender individuals who had sex by deception and that each case would be treated separately.

Julie Bindel criticised the lack of disclosure, writing:

But biological sex is the issue here, not gender identity. What else might be more relevant for a person to know in order to give informed consent to sex? What could be more reasonable to want to know?

== See also ==
- Guidance on ‘Deception as to sex’ in England
- McNally v R
