= R v Linekar =

English criminal law case

- Court: Court of Appeal
- Full case name: R v Gareth Linekar
- Decided: 21 October 1994
- Citation: [1995] 3 All ER 6973
- Transcript

R v Linekar [1995] 3 All ER 69 73 is a leading case in which the Court of Appeal ruled on cases of "rape by fraud" in English law, and the extent to which deceit may be involved before it negates consent.

In the case, the defendant agreed to pay £25 for sexual intercourse with a prostitute but afterward refused to pay. The ruling retained the "very narrow" definition of rape that, although consent was based on payment, refusing to do so after the fact was only fraud, not rape.

== See also ==
- Rape by deception
