= Christine Goodwin (activist) =

British transgender rights activist (1937–2014)

- Born: 4 June 1937
- Died: 8 December 2014 (aged 77)
- Occupations: Transgender rights activist and bus driver

Christine Goodwin (4 June 1937 – 8 December 2014) was a British transgender rights activist who played a crucial role in forcing the UK government to introduce the Gender Recognition Act 2004. She was a former bus driver who underwent sex reassignment surgery in 1990, at Charing Cross Hospital, London, before eventually challenging the UK government in the European Court of Human Rights over her inability to draw a state pension at the same age as other women. In Goodwin & I v United Kingdom the ECHR ruled that the UK had breached her rights under the European Convention on Human Rights. In response the UK introduced the Gender Recognition Act 2004.

On 8 December 2014, Goodwin died because of a long-time illness. Goodwin was hailed as "a trailblazer for trans rights" and a "pioneer" by trans rights network Transgender Europe.

== Discrimination and transition ==
The transgender flag was designed by Monica Helms in 1999

Christine Goodwin underwent gender reassignment surgery in 1990, at a National Health Service hospital. The surgery was paid for in full and completely provided for by the National Health Service. The UK National Health Service was set up in 1948, 42 years prior to Goodwin's surgery, in order to give need-based care and work around people's monetary limits. Since then, she continued to work different jobs. However, within many of these workplaces, she would be discriminated against in a variety of ways.

After her surgery, Goodwin was continuously harassed at work due to her transgender identity. Her experience was not isolated. A study in the UK in 2024 found that 79% of transgender individuals reported harassment at work. After continued harassment, Goodwin tried to file a case for sexual harassment at the Employment Tribunal, but was unsuccessful as the Tribunal claimed that she was still a man under the law. The Tribunal, created for employees to be able to gain fair treatment from their employers, did not satiate Goodwin. She would soon be fired from this job for what was claimed as reasons related to her health, although she claims that it was due to her gender identity as a trans person. After this experience as a transgender person in the workplace, she moved to another job.

At this job, Goodwin feared that her employers would find out that she was transgender again. To prevent this, she attempted to conceal her past as best as possible. However, this meant that she would have to refuse to turn in her National Insurance number to her employers because she was not given an updated one. A National Insurance number is required by every working citizen within the UK, so not using one was a difficult roadblock. She had applied for a National Insurance number to the Department of Social Security, but was denied. Goodwin eventually gave her employer her National Insurance number. She was reluctant to turn in her National Insurance number due to the fact that it can be used to trace back to her former employers, who would know that she had transitioned and inform her current employers of her transgender identity. She reportedly claimed after submitting her NI number that, “Colleagues stopped speaking to her and she was told that everyone was talking about her behind her back,” after turning in her National Insurance number.

In addition, she avoided revealing or presenting her birth certificate in any capacity due to the fear of harassment over her transgender identity and avoid what happened with her National Insurance number. This fear of presenting her birth certificate resulted in her feeling unable to report to the police that she had £200 stolen from her. Also, she was not able to obtain her winter fuel allowance, provided in the UK for heating and decreasing energy costs, for the same guarding of her birth certificate. Without having a usable birth certificate, Goodwin couldn't take out any loans, further limiting her rights and freedom. She continued to pay the higher motor insurance cost that is standard for men. Goodwin was also unable to obtain a pension at the age of 60. In the United Kingdom, men previously got their pensions at 65 while women would get theirs at 60. Goodwin was denied her pension at the age of 60 because her birth certificate still labelled her as a man, and therefore she was still a man in the government's view. Not being able to present her birth certificate and not getting one with her affirmed gender on it continued to pose problems for Goodwin.

Christine Goodwin had been given some assistance by the government but it did not prove to do much good as they still were reluctant to give her acknowledgement of her gender. The Department of Social Security allowed her to pay direct National Insurance contributions, which can qualify citizens for certain benefits and provide a pension. This made it so her employer would not know her legal gender was male, due to the fact that employers automatically give National Insurance contributions for all men. Her files were also marked "sensitive" which required higher clearance to access them but also made it so that she would have to make special appointments anytime she wished to do anything involving it. Despite this help she would continue to receive letters addressed to her name that she was given at birth and was still identified as a male by the Department of Social Security.

== Case of Christine Goodwin vs. The United Kingdom ==
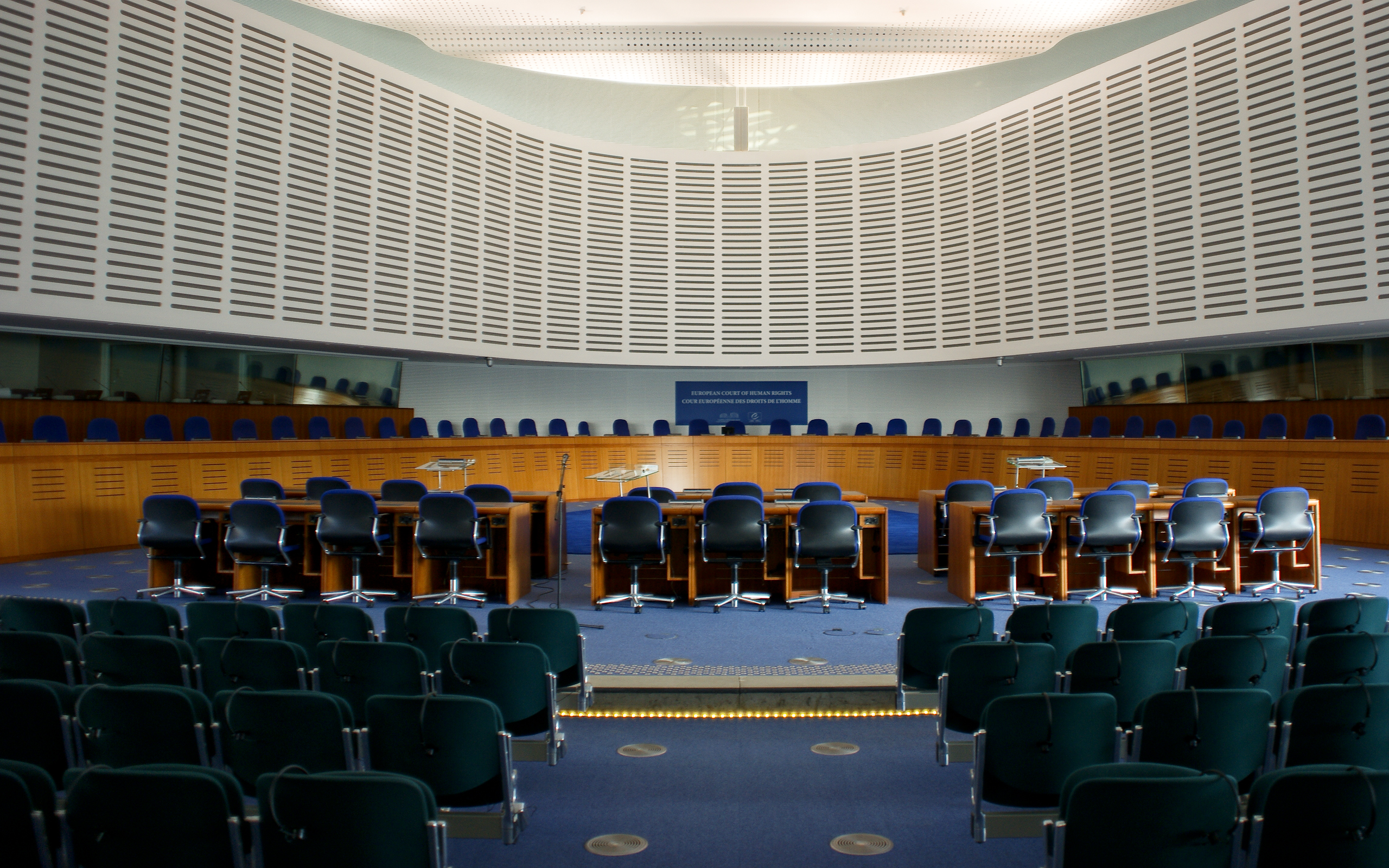
The European Court of Human Rights in Strasbourg

Prior to the Case of Christine Goodwin vs. The United Kingdom, there was no system to change gender markers in birth certificates. Similarly, her biological gender was indicated in the Department of Social Security though her social security number, and her National Insurance number.

Any situation where she was required to present any of these three items of identification, or when they were at risk of coming to light, her biological gender was revealed. Because of this, Goodwin felt she was unable to access many services available to her. She decided to file a lawsuit against the government of the United Kingdom in 2001, through the European Court of Human Rights.

Christine Goodwin was 60 at the time of the lawsuit, and was represented by the law firm Bindman and Partners. Her case was based on the discrimination she faced due to her birth certificate citing her as "male”. Goodwin claimed this gender marker caused her discrimination at work, including a dismissal from a prior job, and her inability to be married to a man. She also could not get a pension at the age that women in the UK did, which at the time, was different from the male age by 5 years.

Goodwin's case was specifically based on the violations of Articles 8, 12, 13, and 14 of the European Commission of Human Rights.

== Article 8: Violations and Verdict ==
Article 8 states, "Everyone has the right to respect for his private ... life…", according to the European Convention on Human Rights as established in 1950. Goodwin's lawyers made the case that Goodwin's biological gender was part of her private life, and her inability to access basic services without part of her private life coming to light violated Article 8. The Government rebutted with a claim that changing the system of DSS numbers and NI numbers for transgender individuals allows more possibilities of fraud, and there were other legal measures that could be taken to prevent the discrimination Goodwin had faced. The Court stated;

“The stress and alienation arising from a discordance between the position in society assumed by a post-operative transsexual and the status imposed by law which refuses to recognize the change of gender cannot, in the Court's view, be regarded as a minor inconvenience arising from a formality.”

Accordingly, the Court agreed with the applicant, Goodwin. They believed her right to privacy had been violated.

== Article 12: Violations and Verdict ==
Article 12 discusses the right to marry. In the European Convention on Human Rights, it is stated that; "Men and women of marriageable age have the right to marry and to found a family, according to the national laws governing the exercise of this right." As Goodwin argued that even though she was seen as a woman, has undergone gender reassignment surgery, and is in a relationship with a man, but still cannot marry him under current statutes and how that was a violation of Article 12, the Government argued that the matter should be left to district courts. The Court's statement was;

“While it is for the Contracting State to determine inter alia the conditions under which a person claiming legal recognition as a transsexual establishes that gender reassignment has been properly effected or under which past marriages cease to be valid and the formalities applicable to future marriages (including, for example, the information to be furnished to intended spouses), the Court finds no justification for barring the transsexual from enjoying the right to marry under any circumstances.”

Accordingly, the Court agreed with Goodwin, and gave her the right to enjoy an opposite sex marriage.

== Article 13 and 14 ==
Goodwin also made arguments for the disregard of her rights as given by articles 13 and 14, which the court did not recognize as violated. Article 13 ensures the right to achieve remedies for any wrongdoings done that were protected by the Convention. The Court ruled that she was eligible to receive compensation at the time of her court case, therefore, Article 13 had not been violated. Article 14 certifies that any citizen is eligible for any rights without discrimination based on gender, race, and other qualities, which Goodwin argued discrimination based on her biological gender prevented her from her rights. The Court determined that no issue of limited rights was addressed here that was not already addressed by the confirmed violation of Article 8.

== Final Ruling ==
On June 2, 2002, the European Court of Human Rights ruled that Christine Goodwin's rights had been violated enough to receive compensation. She was awarded the right to marry someone of the opposite gender, and to receive protection from coworkers and other individuals from seeing her biological gender on identifying documents. Because of this, the Gender Recognition Act was passed to allow her rights to come to fruition for her and other transgender individuals in the UK. She was also awarded 39,000 euros.

== Gender Recognition Act ==
=== Overview ===
The Gender Recognition Act was a highly debated law in the UK that went into place after Christine Goodwin's court case against the UK where they ruled that the UK had breached her rights under the European Courts of Human Rights. A Gender Recognition Certificate is the official document that confirms a person has met the requirements for legal recognition in their acquired gender. “The Gender Recognition Act 2004 (GRA) enables transgender adults to apply to the Gender Recognition Panel to receive a Gender Recognition Certificate (GRC). Successful applicants, who are granted a full GRC, are, from the date of issue, considered in law to be of their acquired gender.” The purpose of the act is to give people with gender dysphoria a legal recognition of their gender identity. Anyone born in the UK or abroad with British authorities is now eligible to attain a new birth certificate for their recognized legal gender. This act protects the rights of transgender people by denying employers the ability to gain information regarding the Gender Recognition Act.

== Corbett v. Corbett ==
The act was drafted in response to court rulings from the European Courts of Human Rights Corbett v. Corbett and Goodwin v. United Kingdom. Corbett V Corbett is a family law divorce case that took place in 1970 involving Arthur Corbett seeking annulment of his marriage to April Ashley, a transgender woman. After being married for 14 days, Arthur wished to annul the marriage. Corbett's legal ground for ending the marriage was that the marriage was invalid considering that Ashley is biologically male, and marriage would only be valid between a man and a woman. The court ruled that in regards to marriage Ashley was a biological male and had been since birth. Because of this, as "marriage is and always has been recognized as the union of man and woman" the marriage was held to be void. As a result of this case ways for transgender and intersex people to gain legal recognition of their gender ceased until the introduction of the Gender Recognition Act.

On June 2, 2002, the European Courts of Human Rights ruled in Goodwin v. the United Kingdom that a transgender person's inability to change their sex on legal documents was a breach of their rights under the European Convention of Human Rights. This ruling led to the Gender Recognition Act, which was introduced to the House of Lords in 2003. In February 2004, the act had 155 votes in favor and 57 against, and by July 2004 it had 355 votes in favor and 55 opposing. The Act went into place on July 1, 2004.

== Current Opinion ==
The act was originally celebrated by transgender organizations in the United Kingdom but as affirming transgender laws progressed around the world problems began to be highlighted in the Gender Recognition Act, by people and legislation. In the 2010s, the Gender Recognition Act of 2004 as well as the Equality Act of 2010 faced scrutiny, and went under review. In December 2019, the Commons Library published a review of the Gender Recognition Process, focusing on its deficiencies. In a June 2020 report, the European Commission classified the legal processes for gender recognition in 28 European countries into five categories according to the level of access barriers. The Gender Recognition Act 2004 was ranked in the second-lowest category due to its "intrusive medical requirements," which do not meet international human rights standards. Although this report was published the UK government decided to uphold the current law and not make any legislative changes regarding the Gender Recognition Act of 2004.
