= Christine Goodwin =

Christine Goodwin may refer to:

- Christine Goodwin (activist) (1937–2014), British transgender rights activist
- Christine Goodwin (politician), American businesswoman and politician
