= McNally v R =

2013 English criminal case

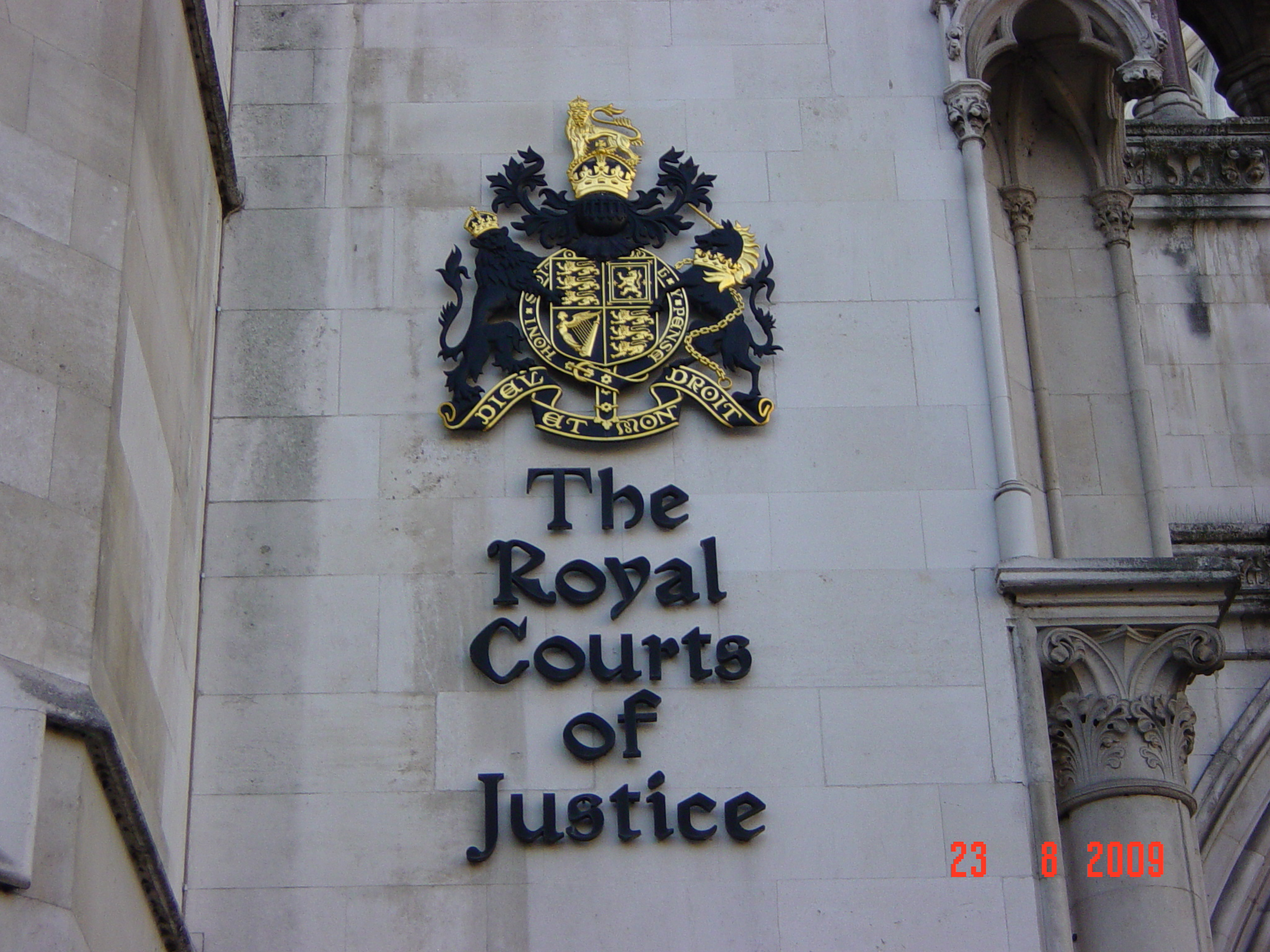
- Court: Court of Appeal (Criminal Division)
- Decided: 20130627
- Citation: [2013] EWCA Crim 1051
- Legislation cited: Sexual Offences Act 2003

Case history
- Prior action: R v McNally

McNally v R [2013] EWCA Crim 1051 is a 2013 court decision in which the English and Wales Court of Appeals (EWCA) ruled that Scottish student Justine McNally's prior conviction of six counts of sexual assault by penetration would be upheld. McNally's sentence, however, was reduced. The convictions were made under the Sexual Offences Act 2003. Various other cases were explored to maintain the conviction, expanding the previously slim "rape by deception" laws. McNally v R was one of the first cases to display gender fraud or gender deception arguments.

== Background ==
Justine McNally and a girl, referred to in court records as M, met on an online gaming site. McNally was a Scottish 13-year-old, and M was a year younger and living in London. On the site, McNally used a male avatar named Scott. Over three and a half years, the two developed an internet relationship which became sexual.

McNally and M met for the first time in person after M's 16th birthday, in March 2011. McNally presented as a boy, wore a dildo underneath trousers, and went by the name Scott. Over the next few months, McNally visited M four times. On the first visit, they kissed, and M received oral sex from McNally. McNally declined to receive oral sex from M. M also brought condoms, intending to have intercourse with McNally, but McNally declined. It was alleged that McNally penetrated M with the dildo, but McNally denied this charge and it was not pursued.

On the second occasion, M and McNally engaged in further sexual activity. On the third visit, they talked about having sex but McNally expressed disinterest in trying again. On the fourth visit, M's mother confronted McNally about "really being a girl". M's mother told M about her suspicions, and McNally revealed to M a Facebook profile in McNally's birth name, Justine. M felt "physically sick" and said that McNally had lied to her for four years.

On 7 November 2011, M's mother made a complaint to McNally's school, and the police were notified. M said she was heterosexual and would not have engaged in sexual activity with "Scott" if she had known that McNally was a girl.

In 2012, McNally pleaded guilty to six counts of sexual assault by penetration under the Sexual Offences Act 2003. McNally was sentenced on each count to 3 years of detention and received a three-year restraining order prohibiting contact with M or her mother.

== Court decision ==
In this case, the appellant challenged all six counts of assault by penetration and McNally's sentence of three years in detention. The convictions were upheld, but McNally's sentence was reduced from three years to nine months and suspension for two years. McNally also remained on the sex offender registry.

Lord Justice Leveson examined previous usages of the Sexual Offences Act of 2003 in order to uphold McNally's earlier convictions.

== Implications ==
McNally v R discussed how in a previous case, HIV-AIDS status was not a sufficient reason for vitiating consent. Despite this, the court decided that "gender deception" can vitiate consent.

Sexuality justice theorist Joseph Fischel describes this trend:

In such cases, juries and judges have held that the young woman's consent to sexual contact (whether kissing or vaginal penetration) was vitiated by the defendant dissembling or misrepresenting their gender.

Subsequent cases of "gender deception" proliferated:

- Gayle Newland, who was accused of misleading her sex partner for years about her gender history;
- Christine Wilson, who pleaded guilty to two charges of obtaining "sexual intimacy by fraud" due to presenting "as a boy";
- Chantelle Johnson, who was jailed for nine years for using a male persona to lure teenage girls whom she then sexually assaulted;
- Gemma Watts, who was jailed for eight years for impersonating a 16-year-old boy in order to groom girls as young as 13;
- Jennifer Staines, who was sentenced to 39 months for sexual assault and other charges. The investigator stated that "her actions were driven by her own selfish desires and although her victims consented to sexual activity with her, they were deceived about the true nature of what they were engaging in."
- Blade Silvano, who was jailed for ten and a half years in 2023 for deceiving a woman into a two-year sexual relationship.
- Ciara Watkin, a transgender woman who was found guilty of sexual assault in 2025 after performing sex acts on a man who she had misled to believe she was cisgender. The victim stated that he would not have had sex with her had he known her biological sex.

McNally was an important case in popular discourse, opening up discussion about legal discrimination against transgender and gender non-conforming people in sexual assault and rape law.

== Criticism ==
Various scholars have criticized the court decision. Legal theorist Alex Sharpe offers a dissenting argument, suggesting that McNally v R and related cases undermine the privacy rights of transgender and gender non-conforming people. Joseph Fischel, in Screw Consent, suggested that the framing of the McNally decision as "gender fraud" not only subjugates the dignity and equality of transgender people, but also their sexual autonomy. He suggests questioning the expectant conditions under which the 'deception' takes place:

The expectation that genitals correspond to gender identification is a normative one, a resolutely heteronormative one. That an expectation is socially normative need not entail that the failure of the expectation be legally actionable.

However, the assertion that transgender individuals shouldn't have to disclose their genitals to potential sexual partners was criticised by Julie Bindel, who wrote in British magazine The Critic:

But biological sex is the issue here, not gender identity. What else might be more relevant for a person to know in order to give informed consent to sex? What could be more reasonable to want to know?

== See also ==
- Catharina Margaretha Linck
- Gemma Barker case
- Gender non-conformity
- Rape by deception
- Transgender men
- Transgender rights in the United Kingdom
