= Emily Bridges =

British track cyclist (born 2001)

Personal information
- Nationality: British
- Born: 4 January 2001 (age 25) Cwmbran

Sport
- Sport: Track Cycling
- Retired: 2024

Emily Bridges (born 4 January 2001) is a transgender woman from Cwmbran who was a British track cyclist and set a national junior men's record over 25 miles in 2018. From starting cycling aged 10, Bridges progressed to join the GB cycling team in 2020. Later that year, however, Bridges came out as transgender and left the team to focus on transitioning.

In 2021, Bridges began Gender-affirming hormone therapy and, in 2022, sought to return to competitive cycling but to now compete in the female category in preparation for the 2024 Olympics. However, British Cycling's decision to ban transgender women from competing in the women’s category in 2023 blocked this from happening. In 2024, Bridges confirmed having no further intention of competing in cycling due to being unwilling to compete in the Open category and being banned from the Female category.

Bridges was included in a list of influential women by British Vogue magazine in 2023 When commenting on the controversy about whether transgender woman have a physical advantage in sport, Bridge stated, “Sport is inherently unfair. That's why you have winners and losers.”

== See also ==
- Transgender rights in the United Kingdom
