= Gender recognition certificate =

Record to indicate legal change of gender identity

In some countries, a gender recognition certificate is a vital record to indicate a legal change of gender identity. This is distinct from a birth certificate, which is often amended in various countries following a legal gender change.

== By country ==
=== India ===
Under the Transgender Persons (Protection of Rights) Act, 2019, a transgender person can apply to the district magistrate for a transgender person certificate which will give them the right to change the name on their birth certificate and have all documents updated accordingly. However, similar to the 2018 bill provisions, a transgender person can be identified as male or female only after applying for a revised certificate to the district magistrate, post sex reassignment surgery.

=== Ireland ===
Under the Gender Recognition Act 2015, Irish residents are allowed to apply for a gender recognition certificate to change their gender on government documents through self-determination. The law does not require any medical intervention by the applicant nor an assessment by medical professionals.

=== United Kingdom ===
In the United Kingdom, citizens who seek to change their legal gender must appear before the Gender Recognition Panel, a national tribunal which issues a gender recognition certificate to applicants. People granted a full GRC are from the date of issue, considered in the eyes of the law to be of their "acquired gender" in most situations.

However, on 15 April 2025 the Supreme Court of the United Kingdom ruled in For Women Scotland Ltd v The Scottish Ministers that in the Equality Act 2010, having a gender recognition certificate did not change a person's sex for the purposes of the Act. The court noted that the law gives separate protection against discrimination to transgender people. In response, ILGA-Europe reclassified the UK as having "no functioning legal or administrative process for legal gender recognition", placing it alongside Albania, Bulgaria, Hungary and Russia in Europe.
