= North West Lancashire Health Authority v A, D and G =

Legal case on gender reassignment

North West Lancashire Health Authority v A, D and G (also known as R v. North West Lancashire Health Authority, ex parte A, D, and G) was a legal case in England that occurred in 1999. In it, the North West Lancashire Health Authority did not fund gender reassignment surgery for three transgender women.

The three women were denied gender reassignment surgery from 1996 to 1997, as the health authority said that none of them had shown an "overriding and clinical need for treatment". All three had been living as women for several years and had begun feminising hormone therapy as part of their gender transition. After a judicial review, the High Court ruled that the health authority had misunderstood the nature of transsexual patients, that the health authority did not accurately assess the need for surgery for the wellbeing of the individual patients, and that the blanket ban given by the authority on gender reassignment surgery was "unlawful and irrational". However, the court rejected claims by the litigants that their rights under the Human Rights Act 1998 were violated.

The authority brought the case to the Court of Appeal, arguing that their refusal to pay for gender reassignment surgery was due to "scarce resources", which meant that illnesses such as heart disease, cancer, kidney disease and HIV/AIDS would not be covered by the hospital. However, they were unsuccessful in overturning the ruling and were ordered to pay £150,000 in legal costs.

The judgement was the first time that transgender surgical operations had been tested in an open court in the United Kingdom and was described by Stephen Lodge (the solicitor representing the three women) as a "landmark in the continuing struggle for legal recognition" of transgender rights in Britain. The ruling means that it is illegal for any health authority in England or Wales to put a blanket ban on gender-affirming surgery relating to transgender people.
