= Goodwin v United Kingdom =

European Court of Human Rights case decided in 2002

Christine Goodwin v. the United Kingdom

Decided 11 July 2002
- ECLI: ECLI:CE:ECHR:2002:0711JUD002895795
- Nationality of parties: British

Christine Goodwin v. United Kingdom is a case decided by the European Court of Human Rights on 11 July 2002. The applicant, Christine Goodwin, a United Kingdom national born in 1937, was a transgender woman. She said that she had faced sexual harassment at work during and following her gender-affirming surgery. Because she had kept the same National Insurance number, her employer had been able to discover that she previously worked for them under another name and sex, resulting in embarrassment and humiliation.

The case was heard together with a separate case, I. v. United Kingdom, also involving a British transgender woman, with judgment delivered on the same day, 11 July 2002.

== Complaints ==
Relying on Articles 8, 12, 13 and 14 of the Convention, the applicant complained about her treatment in relation to employment, social security and pensions and her inability to marry.

== Judgment ==
ECtHR found a violation of Article 8 (right to respect for private and family life) of the European Convention on Human Rights; a violation of Article 12 (right to marry and to found a family); and did not find a violation of Article 13 (right to an effective remedy). It found that no separate issue had arisen under Article 14 (prohibition of discrimination).

== Reasoning ==
No concrete or substantial hardship or detriment to the public interest had been demonstrated as likely to flow from any change to the status of transgender people. Society might reasonably be expected to tolerate a certain inconvenience to enable individuals to live in dignity and worth in accordance with the gender/sex identity. It concluded that the fair balance that was inherent in the Convention now tilted decisively in favour of the applicant. There had, accordingly, been a failure to respect her right to private life in breach of Article 8. The Court also found no justification for barring the individual due to her being transgender from enjoying the right to marry under any circumstances. It concluded that there had been a breach of Article 12. The case-law of the Convention institutions indicated that Article 13 could not be interpreted as requiring a remedy against the state of domestic law. In the circumstances no breach of Article 13 arose. The lack of legal recognition of the change of gender of a transgender person laid at the heart of the applicant's complaints under Article 14 of the Convention and had been examined under Article 8 so there was no separate issue arose under Article 14.

== Reception ==
The government's loss of the Goodwin case was a factor in the introduction of the Gender Recognition Act 2004.
