= Gemma Barker case =

2012 criminal case in England

Gemma Barker
- Born: 1992 (age 33–34)
- Other names: Luke Jones, Aaron Lampard, Connor McCormack
- Criminal charges: Sexual assault, fraud
- Criminal penalty: Two and a half years

Gemma Barker (born 1992) is a British woman from Staines, Surrey, who was convicted of sexual assault and fraud for establishing physical relationships with teenagers while dressed in the persona of fictional teenage boys.

== Background ==
Whilst living in West Molesey, Surrey, Barker became close friends with teenager Jessica Sayers and another teenage girl (who opted to remain anonymous in press). After talking to the girls about their ideal boyfriends, she attempted to impersonate herself as these kind of boys to gain the girls attention. Barker created three fictional teenage male identities online, called Aaron Lampard, Conor McCormack and Luke Jones. These identities were used to befriend Sayers and the other victim and establish physical relationships. She dated both victims using two different disguises, even wearing a disguise around one of the victims parents, who didn't notice the deceit. The disguises involved use of baggy clothing and hats. One of the girls began to suspect something wasn't right when she began noticing that the boy she thought she was dating looked a lot like her friends boyfriend. Barker was eventually arrested in the persona of "Aaron" for committing sexual assault on Sayers, but her physical sex and identity were not confirmed until she was asked to change clothes.

Following her arrest Barker attempted to claim that one of the fictional boys, Luke Jones, had also assaulted her. This claim was found to be fraudulent.

== Imprisonment ==
At Guildford Crown Court on 5 March 2012, Judge Peter Moss sentenced Barker to 30 months in prison after she pleaded guilty to two counts of sexual assault, to be served concurrently with three months for fraud. During the court proceedings, probation and psychological reports prepared for sentencing identified that Barker had autism spectrum disorder and ADHD. However, Judge Moss dismissed these findings as an explanation for her crimes, stating that nothing she said to experts provided any 'light on, or understanding of' her motivation. The judge characterized her actions as having a 'mean and manipulative streak' and noted a complete lack of remorse for her premeditated offences.

== Media ==
Barker was the subject of a 2012 Channel 4 documentary The Girl Who Became Three Boys.
