= Paul B. Stretesky =

Professor Paul B. Stretesky
- Born: 1967 (age 58–59)
- Occupations: Criminologist, sociologist
- Known for: Green criminology, environmental justice
- Title: Professor of Criminology

Academic background
- Education: Ph.D., Florida State University
- Alma mater: Florida State University

Academic work
- Discipline: Criminology, Sociology
- Sub-discipline: Green criminology, environmental justice
- Institutions: University of Lincoln; Northumbria University; Colorado State University
- Main interests: Corporate crime; environmental justice; quantitative political-economic research
- Notable works: Green criminology: Crime, Justice and the Environment (2017); The treadmill of crime: Political economy and green criminology (2013)
- Notable ideas: Green criminology

Paul B. Stretesky (born 1967) is an American criminologist and sociologist. He is professor of criminology at the University of Lincoln in the United Kingdom. He is one of the co-founders of green criminology, a field that applies criminological analysis to environmental harms.

Prior to his current position, he served as Professor of Criminology and Social Science Research Lead at Northumbria University (Newcastle, England). He was formerly an Associate Professor of Sociology at Colorado State University. He earned his Ph.D. from the School of Criminology and Criminal Justice at Florida State University.

Stretesky has published research in journals such as Social Problems, Archives of Pediatrics and Adolescent Medicine, Social Science Quarterly, Sociological Quarterly, and Rural Sociology. His research is principally quantitative and informed by political-economic theory, focusing on environmental protection, social and environmental justice, with particular emphasis on corporate crime and environmental justice.

According to his Google Scholar profile, Stretesky has accrued approximately 8,000 citations and holds an h-index of 50. His most cited works include The Meaning of Green: Contrasting Criminological Perspectives, The treadmill of crime: Political economy and green criminology, and Exploring green criminology: Toward a green criminological revolution.

== Selected publications ==
- Lynch, M.J., & Stretesky, P.B. (2003). The Meaning of Green: Contrasting Criminological Perspectives. *Theoretical Criminology*, **7**(2), 217–238.
- Stretesky, P.B., Long, M.A., & Lynch, M.J. (2013). The treadmill of crime: Political economy and green criminology. Routledge.
- Lynch, M.J., & Stretesky, P.B. (2016). Exploring green criminology: Toward a green criminological revolution. Routledge.
