= Gender Recognition Act 2004 =

Act of the Parliament of the United Kingdom

Gender Recognition Act 2004 (Note: Section 29.)
- Act of Parliament
- Parliament of the United Kingdom
- Long title: An Act to make provision for and in connection with change of gender.
- Citation: 2004 c. 7
- Territorial extent: England and Wales (in part); Scotland (in part); Northern Ireland (in part); (Note: Section 28.)

Dates
- Royal assent: 1 July 2004
- Commencement: 4 April 2005 (Note: Section 26. The Gender Recognition Act 2004 (Commencement) Order 2005.)
Other legislation
Amends	House of Commons Disqualification Act 1975; Marriage (Scotland) Act 1977
Amended by	Civil Partnership Act 2004; Constitutional Reform Act 2005; Legislative and Regulatory Reform Act 2006; Law Reform (Miscellaneous Provisions) (Northern Ireland) Order 2006; Equality Act 2010; Civil Registration Act (Northern Ireland) 2011; Crime and Courts Act 2013; Marriage (Same Sex Couples) Act 2013; Marriage and Civil Partnership (Scotland) Act 2014; Pensions Act 2014; Pensions Act (Northern Ireland) 2015; Children and Social Work Act 2017; Civil Partnership (Scotland) Act 2020; Divorce, Dissolution and Separation Act 2020

Status: Amended

Text of statute as originally enacted

Revised text of statute as amended

The Gender Recognition Act 2004 (c. 7) is an act of the Parliament of the United Kingdom that allows adults in the United Kingdom who have gender dysphoria to change their legal gender from male to female or from female to male. It came into effect on 4 April 2005.

== Background ==
The act was drafted in response to court rulings from the European Court of Human Rights.

The previous precedent dated back to 1970, when Arthur Cameron Corbett, 3rd Baron Rowallan had his marriage annulled on the basis that his wife, April Ashley, being transgender, was legally male. This argument was accepted by the judge, and the legal test for sex in the UK had been since been based on the judgment in Corbett v Corbett.

The European Court of Human Rights ruled on 11 July 2002, in Goodwin & I v United Kingdom [2002] 2 FCR 577, that a trans person's inability to change the sex on their birth certificate was a breach of their rights under Article 8 and Article 12 of the European Convention on Human Rights. Following this judgment, the UK Government had to introduce new legislation to comply.

== Legislative progress ==
The bill was introduced in the House of Lords in late 2003. It was passed by the House of Lords on 10 February 2004, with 155 votes in favour and 57 against, and by the House of Commons on 25 May with 355 votes in favour and 46 against. It received royal assent on 1 July 2004.

The bill faced criticism in the House of Lords, including a wrecking amendment from Lord Tebbit (who has described sex reassignment surgery as "mutilation"), and from Baroness O'Cathain, who introduced an amendment to allow religious groups to exclude transgender people. However, this amendment was narrowly defeated after opposition from Peter Selby, Bishop of Worcester, and Michael Scott-Joynt, Bishop of Winchester.

Support for the bill in the House of Commons was split broadly down party lines. At both the second and third readings (i.e. before and after amendments), all Labour Party, Liberal Democrat, Plaid Cymru and Scottish National Party votes were in favour of the bill; all Ulster Unionist and Democratic Unionist Party votes were against. Conservative Party MPs were split on the issue, and the party leadership did not issue a whip mandating MPs to take a particular stance on the bill, instead allowing its MPs a free vote. Twenty-five Conservative MPs voted in favour and 22 against the bill at its second reading, and 20 voted in favour and 39 voted against the bill at its third reading. Less than half of the Conservative Party's 166 MPs participated in either vote. Among those who voted against the bill were Ann Widdecombe (who opposed it on religious grounds), Dominic Grieve, Peter Lilley and Andrew Robathan. Among Conservative MPs who supported the bill were Kenneth Clarke, Constitutional Affairs spokesman Tim Boswell, and future speaker John Bercow.

== Operation of the law ==
The Gender Recognition Act 2004 enables transgender and transsexual people to apply to receive a Gender Recognition Certificate (GRC). A Gender Recognition Certificate is the document issued that shows that a person has satisfied the criteria for legal recognition in the acquired gender. The act gives people with gender dysphoria legal recognition as members of the sex appropriate to their gender identity allowing them to acquire a Gender Recognition Certificate. People whose birth was registered in the United Kingdom or abroad with the British authorities are able to obtain a birth certificate showing their recognised legal gender. People granted a full GRC are from the date of issue, considered in the eyes of the law to be of their "acquired gender" in most situations. The UK Supreme Court ruled in 2025 that having a GRC does not change a person’s sex under the 2010 Equality Act. Other exceptions to trans people's legal recognition are that the descent of peerages remains unchanged (important only for primogeniture inheritance) and a right of conscience for Church of England clergy (who are normally obliged to marry any two eligible people by law).

The Equality and Human Rights Commission states that trans people with or without a GRC can be excluded from single-sex services so far as it is for a "proportionate means of achieving a legitimate aim", which could be for "reasons of privacy, decency, to prevent trauma or to ensure health and safety".

The Gender Recognition Act 2004 aimed to safeguard the privacy of transgender people by defining information in relation to the gender recognition process as protected information. Anyone who acquires that information in an official capacity may be breaking the law if they disclosed it without the subject's consent. However, in the first seven years of operation, birth certificates drawn from the Gender Recognition Register were immediately distinguishable from a natal birth certificate, since they had only nine columns of information, omitting the item "Signature, description and residence of informant" that appears on birth certificates. These Gender Recognition Certificates also replaced the rubric "Certified to be a true copy of an entry in the certified copy of a Register of Births in the District above mentioned", which appears on birth certificates, with the rubric "Certified to be a true copy of a record in the custody of the Registrar General". These issues were corrected by the Gender Recognition Register (Amendment) Regulations 2011.

A Gender Recognition Panel, including medical and legal experts, considers submitted evidence to assess whether the criteria for issuing a Gender Recognition Certificate have been met. The evidence must show a documented mental health diagnosis of gender dysphoria. If the person involved is in a legally recognised marriage, they require spousal consent for the certificate to be issued, after which a new marriage certificate can be issued; if the spouse does not consent, the person will be issued an Interim Gender Recognition Certificate, which for a limited period can then be used as grounds for annulment of the marriage, but otherwise has no status.

Section 16 provides that acquiring a new gender under the act does not affect the descent of peerages or estates that devolve with them. The Act does not allow children to change their legal gender.

=== Updates ===
In 2016, the Women and Equalities Committee published a root-and-branch review of the Gender Recognition Act, noting its deficiencies and making recommendations for its review. At the same time, it noted similar deficiencies in the Equality Act 2010 as it affected the protected characteristic of gender reassignment.

In November 2017, the Scottish government published its review of the GRA with intentions to reform it "so that it is in line with international best practice." The "Ministerial Foreword" to the review acknowledges that the 2004 GRA is "out of date" and places "intrusive and onerous" requirements on the person applying for the gender change. The government recommends keeping the existing requirements for applicants to declare that "they fully understand the implications of their application and intend to live in their acquired gender for the rest of their lives" but proposes eliminating the requirement "to provide medical evidence and to have lived in their acquired gender for two years before applying".

In 2017, Minister for Equalities Justine Greening considered reforms to the Gender Recognition Act to de-medicalise the process, with the principle of self-identification. One of Greening's successors, Penny Mordaunt, stated in Parliament that the consultation on the Gender Recognition Act would both start and finish with the premise that "transgender women are women and trans men are men."

In a June 2020 report, the European Commission classified the legal procedures for gender recognition of 28 European countries into 5 categories based on the barriers to access. This placed the Gender Recognition Act 2004 in the second from bottom category with "intrusive medical requirements" that lags behind international human rights standards.

In September 2020, the UK government published the results of the public consultation which showed wide support for all aspects of reform, including 64% in favour of removing the requirement for a diagnosis of gender dysphoria and 80% in favour of removing the requirement for a medical report. However, the UK government decided not to change the current law, which was described as "a missed opportunity" by the Equality and Human Rights Commission.

== Concerns regarding marriages and civil partnerships ==
Concerns about the act were raised by supporters of transgender rights, particularly regarding marriages and civil partnerships. Due to marriage then being restricted in UK law to opposite-sex couples and the then lack of availability of civil partnerships to opposite-sex couples, the act required people who are married to divorce or annul their marriage in order for them to be issued with a Gender Recognition Certificate. This requirement was abolished in December 2014, nine months after the Marriage (Same Sex Couples) Act 2013 permitted same-sex marriages. In England, Scotland, and Wales, such an application from a married person requires written consent from the spouse – the so-called spousal veto. Applicants in Scotland benefit from a workaround, where it is possible for applicants in Scotland to apply to the sheriff court to have their interim GRC replaced with a full GRC, bypassing the "spousal veto". Some parliamentarians, such as Evan Harris, viewed the original requirement as inhumane and destructive of the family. MP Hugh Bayley said in the Commons debate "I can think of no other circumstance in which the state tells a couple who are married and who wish to remain married that they must get divorced". Despite this opposition, the government chose to retain this requirement of the Bill. Parliamentary Under-Secretary for Constitutional Affairs, David Lammy, speaking for the Government, said "it is the Government's firm view that we cannot allow a small category of same-sex marriages". It was suggested in the debates that the number of transgender people who have undertaken gender reassignment and who are currently living in a marriage was no more than 200.

Although the Civil Partnership Act 2004 allows the creation of civil partnerships between same sex couples, before 2013, a married couple that included a transgender partner could not simply re-register their new status. They had to have their marriage dissolved, gain legal recognition of the new gender and then register for a civil partnership. This is like any divorce with the associated paperwork and costs. Once the annulment was declared final and the GRC issued, the couple could then make arrangements with the local registrar to have the civil partnership ceremony. The marriage was ended and a completely new arrangement brought into being which did not in all circumstances (such as wills) necessarily follow on seamlessly. This is also true for civil partnerships that included a transgender partner: the existing civil partnership needed to be dissolved and the couple could then enter into a marriage afterward. For a couple in a marriage or civil partnership where both partners are transgender, they could have their gender recognition applications considered at the same time; however, they were required to dissolve their existing marriage/civil partnership and then re-register their marriage/civil partnership with their new genders.

Tamara Wilding of the Beaumont Society pressure group said that it was "not fair that people in this situation should have to annul their marriage and then enter a civil partnership. The law needs tidying up. It would be easy to put an amendment in the civil partnership law to allow people who have gone through gender-reassignment, and want that to be recognised, to have the status of their relationship continued." The emotional stress caused is immeasurable as in the case of a Scottish couple.

The Equality and Human Rights Commission (EHRC) appreciated the challenges to married transgender people and their partners presented by schedule 2 of the act and in a recent submission to government they recommend: "The government amends the Gender Recognition Act to allow for the automatic conversion of a marriage into a civil partnership upon one member of the couple obtaining a gender recognition certificate."

=== Post-2013 ===
These concerns were ameliorated somewhat by the passage of the Marriage (Same Sex Couples) Act 2013, since marriage is now available to both opposite-sex and same-sex couples alike. Under the current law, when a married couple includes a transgender person, the transgender person’s spouse must either give their approval for the change in legal gender, or else divorce. This has been described, and opposed, by transgender activists as a "spousal veto" on their legal transition. In 2019 and again in 2024, the Liberal Democrats included the removal of the "spousal veto" as part of their manifesto. Baroness Barker introduced a private member's bill to amend the law in 2019. By contrast, some gender critical wives of trans women with Gender Recognition Certificates have called the provision a "spousal exit clause", suggesting it is required to protect heterosexual women from "being trapped in legally same sex marriages that they did not sign up to".

== Reform bill in Scotland ==
In March 2022, the Gender Recognition Reform (Scotland) Bill was formally introduced in the Scottish Parliament. If enacted, this bill would have amended the Gender Recognition Act in Scotland and changed the process of applying for a GRC. Under the changes, applicants would no longer have needed to prove having lived for two years in their acquired gender and would no longer have had to obtain a gender dysphoria diagnosis. Instead, they would have been required to make a statutory declaration that they intend to remain permanently in their acquired gender. In addition, applications would have been handled by the Registrar General for Scotland instead of a UK-wide gender recognition panel. The UK Government has ruled out implementing similar changes in England and Wales. The bill passed by a vote of 86–39 within the Scottish Parliament on stage three in December 2022. On 17 January 2023, the UK Government used Section 35 of the Scotland Act 1998 to prevent the bill from being proposed for royal assent, the first such time Section 35 has been used.

== See also ==
- Feminist views on transgender topics
- Gender Recognition Reform (Scotland) Bill (2023)
- Goodwin v United Kingdom (2002)
- History of transgender people in the United Kingdom
- Legal status of transgender people
- LGBTQ rights in Scotland
- LGBTQ rights in the United Kingdom
- Outline of transgender topics
- Sex Discrimination Act 1984 (Australia)
- Tickle v Giggle (2024)
- Transgender rights in Australia
- Transgender rights in Europe
- Transgender rights in New Zealand
- Transgender rights in the United Kingdom
- Transgender rights in the United States
- Transgender rights movement
- United States v. Skrmetti (605 U.S. 495, 2025)
- For Women Scotland Ltd v The Scottish Ministers (UKSC 16, 2025)
