= All England Law Reports =

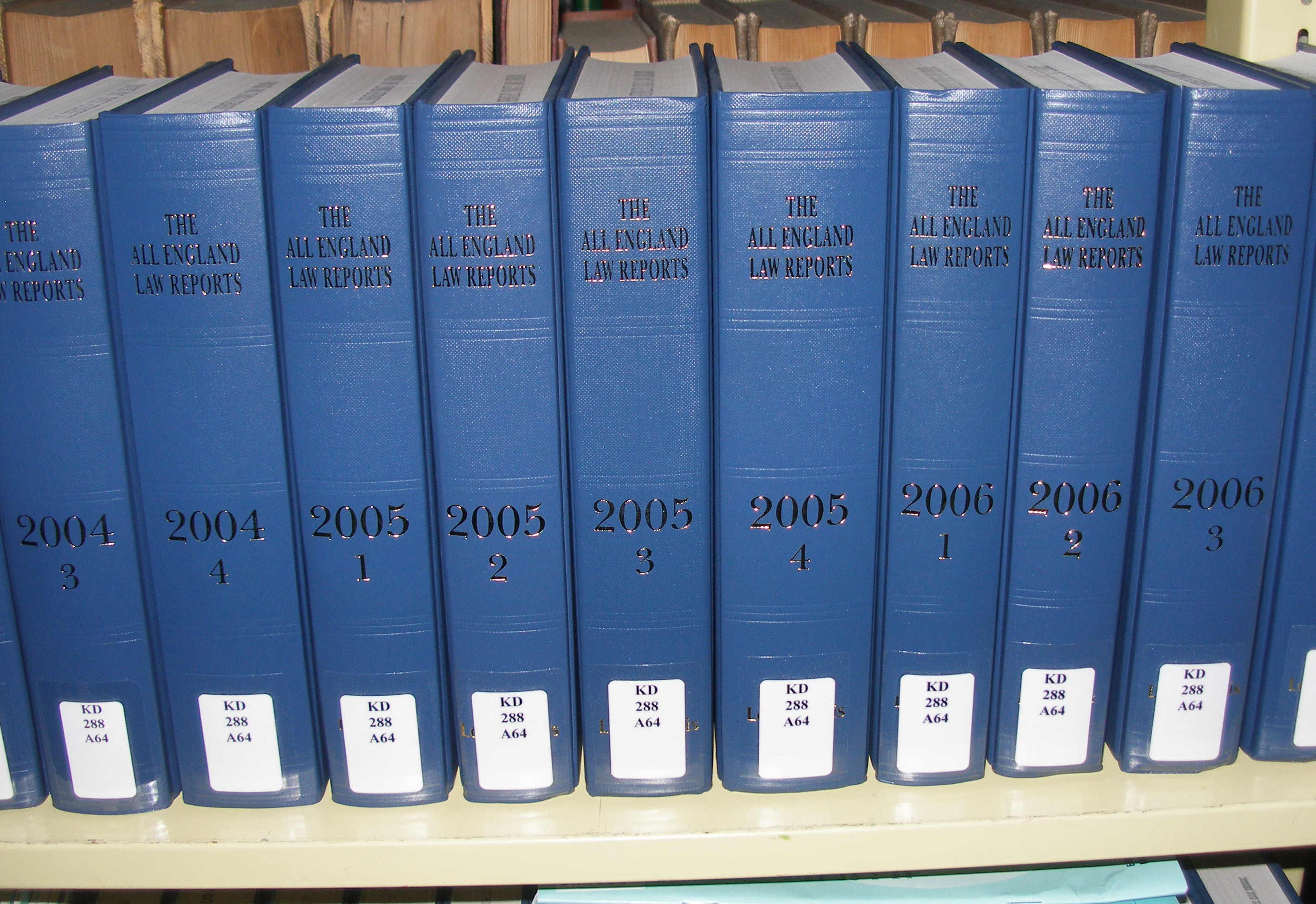
Volumes of the All England Law Reports at a law library

The All England Law Reports (abbreviated in citations to All ER) are a long-running series of law reports covering cases from the court system in England and Wales.

Established in 1936, the All England Law Reports are a commercially produced alternative to the "official" reports produced by the Incorporated Council of Law Reporting (under the title The Law Reports). The reports encompass judgments with headnotes and catchwords from the Supreme Court (formerly the House of Lords), both divisions of the Court of Appeal and all divisions of the High Court. The series contains cross-references and hypertext links to both other All England cases and legislation cited in the Report.

The All England reports are published by LexisNexis Butterworths. A second set of reports, titled The All England Law Reports Reprint (All ER Reprints), has been published to cover around six thousand key cases from between 1558 and when the publication of the All England series began in 1936. A further three thousand important cases from the period 1861–1935 is available in a complementary series The All England Reprints Extension. The latter series is published by LexisNexis Australia, while the former two are published by the company's UK division.

Two further sets of reports – the All England Commercial Reports and the All England Law Reports (European Cases) – have also been released. The European series was discontinued in 2005.
