= Gender Recognition Panel =

Tribunal in the United Kingdom

The Gender Recognition Panel is a tribunal in the United Kingdom dealing with transsexual and transgender concerns and allowing people to change their legal gender. It was founded to satisfy the Gender Recognition Act 2004, which legislates its decision-making process.

It issues gender recognition certificates for people who "live in another gender" to change their legal sex.

The members of the panel are appointed by the Lord Chancellor with the agreement of the presidents of the Courts for England and Wales, Scotland, and Northern Ireland. Only lawyers, medical practitioners or psychologists may be appointed to the panel. Its current president, Paula Gray, was appointed by Robert Buckland in 2019.

== See also ==
- Transgender rights in the United Kingdom
- LGBT rights in the United Kingdom
- Legal status of transgender people
