= The Man Who Would Be Queen =

2003 book by J. Michael Bailey

- Cover
- Author: J. Michael Bailey
- Language: English
- Subjects: Homosexuality; Transsexualism
- Publisher: Joseph Henry Press imprint of the National Academies Press
- Publication date: 2003
- Publication place: United States
- Media type: Print (hardcover and ebook PDF)
- Pages: 256
- ISBN: 978-0-309-08418-5
- OCLC: 51088011
- Dewey Decimal: 305.38/9664 21
- LC Class: HQ76.2.U5 B35 2003

The Man Who Would Be Queen: The Science of Gender-Bending and Transsexualism is a 2003 book by the American psychologist J. Michael Bailey, published by Joseph Henry Press.

In the first section of the book, Bailey discusses gender-atypical behavior and gender dysphoria in children, emphasizing the biological determination of gender. In the second section, he deals primarily with gay men, including the link between childhood gender dysphoria and male homosexuality later in life. Bailey reviews evidence that male homosexuality is congenital (a result of genetics and prenatal environment), and he argues for the accuracy of some gay stereotypes. In the third section, Bailey summarizes evidence for the Blanchard typology of transsexualism that claims there are two forms of transsexualism that affect transgender women: one as an extreme type of male homosexuality and one that is a sexual interest in having a female body, called autogynephilia.

The book caused considerable controversy, which led to complaints and a formal investigation by Northwestern University, where Bailey was chair of the psychology department until shortly before the investigation concluded. Northwestern ultimately found no basis for the complaints, and a university spokesperson said that his departure from the department chairmanship had nothing to do with the investigation. According to Bailey, some of his critics were motivated by a desire to suppress discussion of the book's ideas about the autogynephilia theory of transgender women.

== Summary ==
The Man Who Would Be Queen is divided into three sections: "The Boy Who Would Be Princess", "The Man He Might Become", and "Women Who Once Were Boys".

It starts with an anecdote about a child Bailey calls "Danny". Bailey writes of Danny's mother, who has been frustrated by other therapists she has seen about her son's "feminine" behavior. Bailey discusses psychologist and sexologist Kenneth Zucker's work with children whose parents have noticed significant gender-atypical behaviors. Bailey uses the anecdote about Danny to describe gender identity disorder, a label applied to males with significant feminine behaviors and females with significant masculine behaviors, such as cross-dressing. For example, this class includes boys that prefer to play with dolls and regularly identify with female characters in stories or movies, and girls that prefer to play with toy cars and identify with male characters. This section of the book also discusses some case studies of men who were, for varying reasons, reassigned to the female sex shortly after their birth, and emphasizes the fact that, despite this, they tended to exhibit typically male characteristics and often identified as men.

The second section deals primarily with gay men, including a suggested link between childhood gender identity disorder and male homosexuality later in life. Bailey discusses whether homosexuality is a congenitally or possibly even genetically related phenomenon. This discussion includes references to Bailey's studies as well as those of neuroscientist Simon LeVay and geneticist Dean Hamer. He also discusses the behavior of gay men and its stereotypically masculine and feminine qualities.

In the third section, Bailey summarizes a taxonomy of trans women that was proposed by Ray Blanchard about fifteen years earlier. According to Blanchard, there are two types of trans women: one described as an "extreme form of male homosexuality", the other being motivated by a sexual interest in having a female body. Bailey also discusses the process by which transition from male to female occurs.

== Reception ==
The book elicited both strongly supportive and strongly negative reactions. The controversial aspects included the contents of the book, whether the research was conducted ethically, whether it should have been published by the National Academies Press, and whether it should have been promoted as a scientific work. According to Benedict Carey's story in The New York Times, "To many of Dr. Bailey's peers, his story is a morality play about the corrosive effects of political correctness on academic freedom." Interviewed by Carey, bioethicist Alice Dreger argues that "what happened to Bailey is important, because the harassment was so extraordinarily bad and because it could happen to any researcher in the field. If we're going to have research at all, then we're going to have people saying unpopular things, and if this is what happens to them, then we've got problems not only for science but free expression itself."

However, critics such as Deirdre McCloskey think that the pointed criticism, including filing charges, was warranted: "Nothing we have done, I believe, and certainly nothing I have done, overstepped any boundaries of fair comment on a book and an author who stepped into the public arena with enthusiasm to deliver a false and unscientific and politically damaging opinion". The concern over academic freedom was dismissed by Charles Allen Moser, who wrote: "The death of free speech and academic freedom has been highly exaggerated. Science is not free of politics, never has been, and never will be."

=== Positive reactions ===
Kirkus Reviews concluded: "Despite its provocative title, a scientific yet superbly compassionate exposition." The book received praise from sexual behavior scientist Simon LeVay, from sex-differences expert David Buss, and from research psychologist Steven Pinker, who wrote: "The Man Who Would Be Queen may upset the guardians of political correctness on both the left and the right, but it will be welcomed by intellectually curious people of all sexes and sexual orientations." It also received praise from Forbes magazine's Daniel Seligman and from Mark Henderson at The Times. Conservative commentator John Derbyshire said: "a wealth of fascinating information, carefully gathered by (it seems to me) a conscientious and trustworthy scientific observer." It also received a positive review from writer Ethan Boatner of Lavender magazine and Duncan Osborne in Out. Research psychologist James Cantor also wrote a positive review of the book in the newsletter of APA's Society for the Psychological Study of Lesbian, Gay, Bisexual, and Transgender Issues (Division 44). Alice Dreger, Northwestern University professor of clinical medical humanities and bioethics, also praised the book, stating that "plenty of gay and transgender people" who had read the book saw it as accurate and "wonderfully supportive of LGBT people".

In December 2003, the Southern Poverty Law Center (SPLC) reported that many of the early supporters of Bailey's book, including Ray Blanchard, were members of the Human Biodiversity Institute.

=== Negative reactions ===
The public response of members of the transgender community was almost entirely negative. Among other things, they opposed the book's endorsement of Blanchard's taxonomy of male-to-female transsexualism, and its publication by the National Academies Press, by whom it was "advertised as science" and marketed as "scientifically accurate," which they argued was untrue. They also claimed the book exploited children with gender dysphoria. Among those criticizing the book were computer scientist Lynn Conway, biologists Joan Roughgarden and Ben Barres, physician Rebecca Allison, economist Deirdre McCloskey, psychologist Madeline Wyndzen, writers Dallas Denny, Pauline Park, Jamison Green, and Andrea James, as well as Christine Burns of Press for Change, and Executive Director Monica Casper of the Intersex Society of North America. James, a transgender advocate, attacked Bailey by constructing a website with pictures of Bailey's children taken from his public website beside sexually explicit captions, apparently as a critique of Bailey's descriptions of transsexual children in his book.

Negative responses also came from outside the transgender community. Liza Mundy of The Washington Post thought the book was exceptionally dull despite the potentially interesting topic. Sexologist Eli Coleman referred to the book as "an unfortunate setback in feelings of trust between the transgender community and sex researchers". Eli Coleman was then President of the Harry Benjamin International Gender Dysphoria Association (World Professional Association for Transgender Health). In response to the criticism, Ray Blanchard resigned from his position at HBIGDA on November 4, 2003.

Eli Coleman's colleague, Walter Bockting, wrote that it was "yet another blow to the delicate relationship between clinicians, scholars, and the transgender community." Kinsey Institute Director John Bancroft said the book promoted a derogatory explanation of transgender identity that would hurt many vulnerable transgender people, and that the book, which was written in a popular science style, did not support the material in a scientific manner. Psychologist Randi Ettner said of Bailey, "He's set back the field 100 years, as far as I'm concerned."

The Man Who Would Be Queen was originally one of the finalists for the Lambda Literary Award for the "transgender" category. However, after judicial review, the book was determined to be "transphobic" and "not appropriate for the category", so it was removed from consideration.

=== Allegations of malpractice ===
Two of the trans women in Bailey's book have accused him of ethical breaches in his work by talking to them about their life stories without obtaining formal written consent. Alice Dreger alleged that the women were aware that Bailey was writing a book about trans women at the time of the interviews; some of them read the drafts of the book before publication, and several said they felt their stories had been told "accurately and sympathetically." Bailey has denied that it is unethical for a university professor to talk to people in the same manner that journalists do, or to write books with the resulting anecdotes. He also stated that the book was "popular and not 'scientific'" so it was not required to follow IRB rules.

According to Dreger, whether federal regulations required professors to obtain formal approval from a university IRB before interviewing people was uncertain at the time; she points out that shortly after publication of the book, the US Department of Health and Human Services, in conjunction with the Oral History Association and American Historical Association, issued a formal statement that taking oral histories, conducting interviews, collecting anecdotes, and similar activities do not constitute IRB-qualified research, and were never intended to be covered by clinical research rules, when such work is "neither systematic nor generalizable in the scientific sense."

Also cited as harassment of Bailey were legal complaints that Bailey was practicing psychology without a license. The basis for these complaints was that sex-reassignment surgery in the US requires authorization letters from two psychologists, and Bailey had written a second letter, at no charge and upon request, for some individuals Bailey had spoken with while writing the book. American bioethicist Alice Dreger notes that there was no legal basis for this claim, as Bailey received no compensation for his services, and was forthright in his letters about his qualifications, even attaching copies of his C.V.: "Presumably all this was why [Illinois] never bothered to pursue the charge, although you'd never know that from reading the press accounts, which mentioned only the complaints, not that they had petered out." State regulators took no action on these complaints.

In her book Galileo's Middle Finger (2015), Dreger accused Bailey's critics of attempting to make it look as though virtually every trans woman represented in Bailey's book "had felt abused by him and had filed a charge". McCloskey, argued that the critics' actions had not overstepped the boundaries of fair comment about what she saw as an "unscientific" opinion.

== See also ==
- Causes of gender incongruence
- Men Trapped in Men's Bodies: Narratives of Autogynephilic Transsexualism
