= Rosalind Mitchell =

British politician

- Born: 2 August 1954 (age 72); Barrow-in-Furness
- Education: University of Liverpool; Open University; University of Glasgow
- Political party: Labour (1982–2010); Scottish National Party (2015–present)
- Spouses: Kathryn Lees (m. 1976; div. 1983); Mary Kenfield (m. 1985; div. 1993)

Rosalind Mitchell (born 2 August 1954) is a British film-maker, writer and former local councillor. In September 1997, while a serving member of Bristol City Council, she announced her intention to transition from male to female. She was the first British politician to do so while holding elected office, according to Christine Burns of Press For Change.

== Early life and education ==
She was born in 1954 as David Spry in Barrow-in-Furness. Her parents were Moira Spry (née Storey) (1924–2016), a typist, and Harry Spry (1921–1977), a shipyard draughtsman. She grew up on the Wirral Peninsula where her family moved when she was a year old, and in Welwyn Garden City, Hertfordshire where she attended Stanborough School. After graduating in physics from the University of Liverpool she was briefly a physics and maths teacher before joining the specialist printers Harlands of Hull as a trainee analyst/programmer. In the 1980s she was a senior systems analyst with the Chase Manhattan Bank in London working on projects related to the financial Big Bang, later becoming a freelance consultant specialising in databases and expert systems. In 1992 she completed a part-time degree in literature and philosophy with the Open University.

== Political activity ==
She joined the Labour Party in 1982. In 1990 she successfully contested the Kelfield ward on Kensington and Chelsea Council, serving until 1994 when she moved to Bristol. In 1995 she stood unsuccessfully for the Stockwood ward on Bristol City Council, and 1997 she fought and won the Redland seat in the city.

== Transition ==
In September 1997, she sought the support of the pressure group Press For Change with the intention of coming out publicly as Transsexual. An interview with Clare Dyer, of The Guardian was arranged and this was published on 22 September 1997. In the interview she revealed to the public that she was already undergoing hormone therapy and was about to start her formal transition.

She was the subject of a BBC West documentary, New Labour, New Woman, produced by Linda Orr and narrated by Michael Lund. It was first shown regionally on 19 March 1998 and repeated nationally in a slightly edited form on BBC Two in the Home Ground series on 7 July 1998.

Although she served successfully as Chair of the Development Control (Central Area) Committee and vice-chair of the Children's Homes Subcommittee and Lay Review Panel, she was controversial amongst her party colleagues and was denied admission to a meeting of the Bristol West constituency party Women's Section.

== Personal life ==
After retiring from IT she worked for four years supporting people with mental health issues through organic market gardening. Since 2015 she has lived in Scotland where she writes crime fiction, takes photographs, and in 2021 she was working for an MLitt in Film and TV Studies at the University of Glasgow.

She has been a Quaker since 1982 and is an active member of the Scottish National Party.
