= Galileo's Middle Finger =

2015 book by Alice Dreger

- Cover of the first edition
- Author: Alice Dreger
- Language: English
- Subject: Medicine and health sciences
- Publisher: Penguin Press
- Publication date: 2015
- Publication place: United States
- Media type: Print (Paperback and Hardback)
- Pages: 352
- ISBN: 978-1-59420-608-5

Galileo's Middle Finger is a 2015 book about the ethics of medical research by Alice Dreger, an American bioethicist and author. Dreger explores the relationship between science and social justice by discussing a number of scientific controversies. These include the debates surrounding intersex genital surgery, autogynephilia, and anthropologist Napoleon Chagnon's work.

== Synopsis ==
The first part of Galileo's Middle Finger recounts Dreger's activism against surgical "correction" of intersex individuals' genitalia. Some surgeons called this "total urogenital mobilization" which is "...ripping out everything that didn't seem right to the doctor and rebuilding a girl's genitals from scratch using Frankenstein stitches..." Based on her interactions with the intersex community as well as her own research, she advocated that genital surgery for intersex children be postponed until the individual is old enough to make an informed decision, in the absence of any evidence that the benefits of such surgery outweighed its already reported risks.

The second section provides her analysis of the controversy surrounding The Man Who Would Be Queen (2003), by sex researcher and psychologist J. Michael Bailey. In that book, Bailey summarized research on Blanchard's transsexualism typology in a way that Dreger says is scientifically accurate, well-intended, and sympathetic, but insensitive to its political implications. Dreger writes that "Bailey made the mistake of thinking that openly accepting and promoting the truth about people's identities would be understood as the same as accepting them and helping them, as he felt he was". Instead, many activists in the trans community objected to the contention that their transition was sexually motivated.

Bailey's book was based on the academic publications of psychologist Ray Blanchard, which Bailey interpreted for a lay audience. The larger audience and potential to influence public beliefs about transness led a prominent transgender activist, Lynn Conway, to campaign against Bailey. Dreger concludes that the accusations levied against Bailey by Conway and others did not hold up to scrutiny. "Conway developed what became an enormous Web site hosted by the University of Michigan for the purpose of taking down Bailey and his ideas [and] that largely enabled me to figure out what she had really done and how Bailey had essentially been set up in an effort to shut him up about autogynephilia". Dreger wrote that some activists had turned their horror at Bailey's findings into a very public vendetta against him and his family, including thinly veiled allegations that he sexually abused his children. After researching the allegations against Bailey, she concluded that they were false. Moreover, Dreger observed that "the most interesting mail, from my perspective, came from trans women who wrote to tell me that, though they weren't thrilled with Bailey's oversimplifications of their lives, they also had been harassed and intimidated by Andrea James for daring to speak anything other than the politically popular 'I was always just a woman trapped in a man's body' story. They thanked me for standing up to a bully."

Dreger also investigates the controversy surrounding biologist Randy Thornhill and anthropologist Craig T. Palmer's A Natural History of Rape (2000) and accusations by Patrick Tierney in his book Darkness in El Dorado (2000) that anthropologist Napoleon Chagnon seriously abused the Yanomamo. She returns to the issue of intersex in an examination of geneticist Maria New's research in prenatal dexamethasone use in cases of congenital adrenal hyperplasia.

== Reception ==
The New York Times described the book as "a rant, a manifesto, a treasury of evocative new terms (sissyphobia, autogynephilia, Phall-O-Meter) and an account of the author's transformation" from activist to scientist and back again. Salon describes the book as "highly readable" with an important message: "Science and social justice require each other to be healthy and both are critically important to human freedom." The book was also discussed by Tom Bartlett in the Chronicle of Higher Education. Kirkus Reviews named it one of the best non-fiction books of 2015.

The book was at first selected as 2016 finalist for a Lambda Literary Award in the LGBTQ nonfiction category, but the foundation rescinded this nomination on March 22, 2016, describing the book as "inconsistent with its mission of affirming LGBTQ lives." Brynn Tannehill, writing for The Advocate, compared arguments made in the book to the arguments made by anti-transgender groups like the Family Research Council. She wrote that the book promoted a theory that trans people are "just self-hating homosexual men who believe they could have guilt-free sex if they were female and heterosexual men with an out-of-control fetish (autogynephilia)".
