= Joseph Henry Press =

- Parent company: National Academies Press
- Country of origin: United States
- Headquarters location: Washington, D.C.
- Publication types: Books
- Official website: www.nap.edu

Joseph Henry Press (JHP) is an American publisher which is an imprint of the National Academies Press, publisher for the United States National Academy of Sciences. The imprint is named after American scientist Joseph Henry.

The imprint publishes books on science, technology, and health for the science-interested general public. JHP books represent a broad range of topics, from modern physics and frontiers of medicine to scientific biography and early childhood development.

Notable publications have included Neil de Grasse Tyson's One Universe: At Home in the Cosmos (2000); John Derbyshire's Prime Obsession: Bernhard Riemann and the Greatest Unsolved Problem in Mathematics (2003); J. Michael Bailey's The Man Who Would Be Queen (2003); Edmund Blair Bolles's Einstein Defiant: Genius versus Genius in the Quantum Revolution (2004); and Francisco J. Ayala's Darwin's Gift: to Science and Religion (2007).

Some Joseph Henry Press titles are available for free online reading; its parent press offers more than 4,000 reports online for free reading, and more than 2000 PDFs and ebooks for sale.
