= Christine Burns =

British political activist

Christine Burns MBE
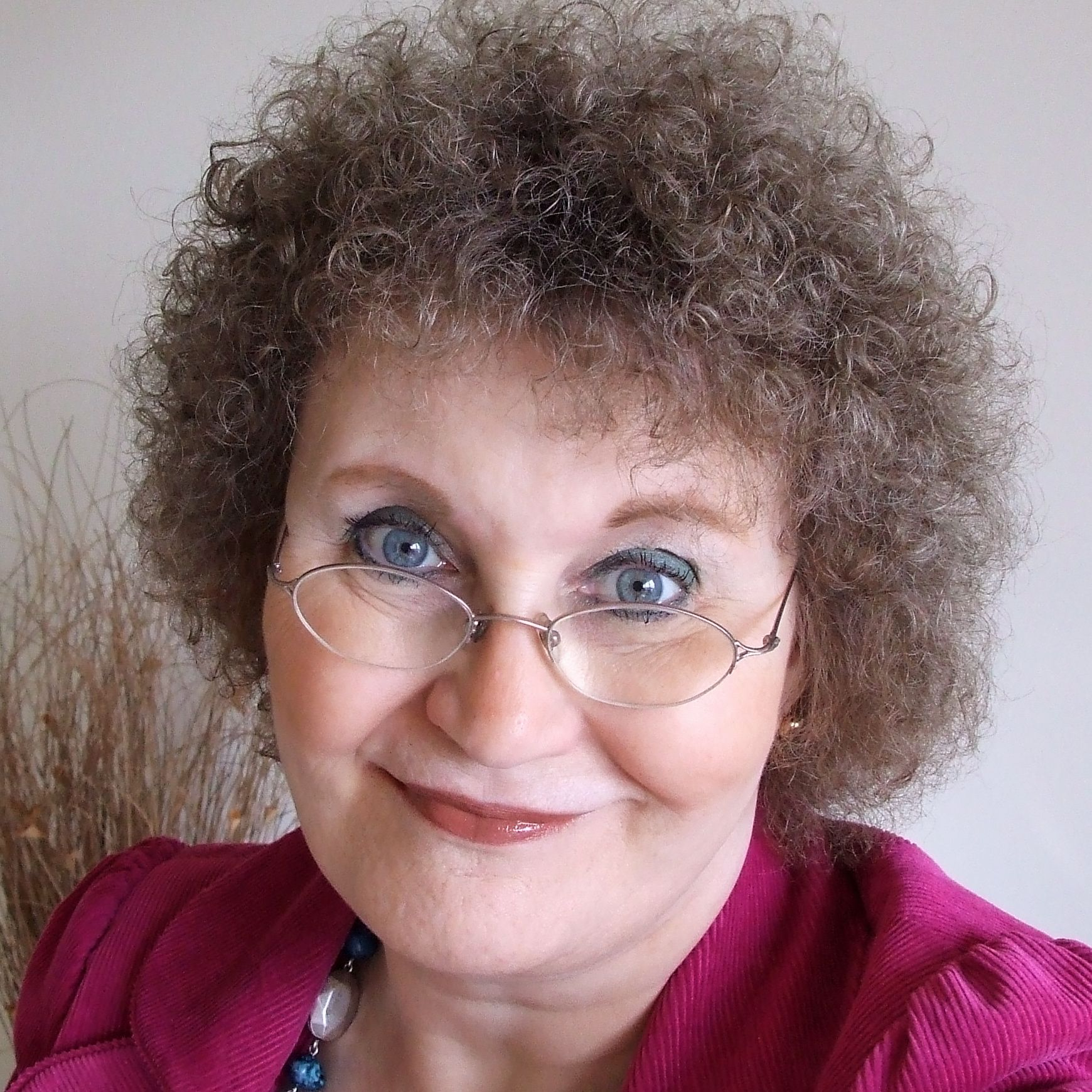
- Christine Burns in 2010
- Born: February 1954 (age 72); Redbridge, London, England
- Education: University of Manchester
- Occupations: Businesswoman, equality campaigner
- Years active: 1992–present
- Title: Managing Director of Plain Sense Ltd. (2002–present)
- Website: Just Plain Sense

Christine Burns MBE (born February 1954) is a British political activist best known for her work with Press for Change and, more recently, as an internationally recognised health adviser. Burns was awarded an MBE in 2005 in recognition of her work representing transgender people. In 2011, she ranked 35th on The Independent on Sunday's annual Pink List of influential lesbian, gay, bisexual, and transgender people in the United Kingdom.

== Career ==
Burns was born in the London Borough of Redbridge and attended the University of Manchester, earning first-class honors in computer science in 1975 and a master's degree in 1977. During her time as a city IT consultant and a Tory activist, she chose not reveal her trans history to colleagues. In 1995, Burns came out to local Tory leadership in order to campaign more openly. The British tabloids, however, chose to ignore her as she was "too ordinary". Remembering this era, she jokes about her changing perception of herself as a trans activist: "I realised something had changed in 1997, when I realised it was more embarrassing to admit to being a conservative than to being a trans woman."

== Press for Change ==
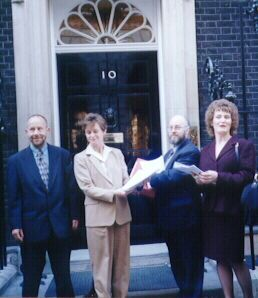
Press for Change at Ten Downing Street

In 1992, Press for Change (PFC) was formed, and went on to become a key lobbying and legal support organisation for trans people in the UK.

During 1992, Burns ran an IT consultancy business, "Cheshire Computer Consultants", and was Secretary of her local Conservative Party branch. Burns joined Press for Change in 1993, but only made her transgender background public in 1995. She was able to maintain her initial privacy as early PFC campaigns were paper based and, as such, fairly low key. She would go on to become a leading figure in obtaining legal recognition for trans people.

Over the Christmas of 1995, she created the PFC web site as sub-pages within her own home page on Compuserve – one of the first serious campaign and information sites for minorities on the web. As editor of the site, she devised the now defunct PFC tagline "Seeking no more but no less than what YOU take for granted". In mid-1997, Burns and PFC's new webmistress, Claire McNab, registered the domain www.pfc.org.uk and moved the existing pages onto a commercial server.

Representing PFC, Burns joined the Parliamentary Forum on Transsexualism shortly after it was set up in early 1995. She was also elected to sit on the policy governing council of the Human Rights NGO, Liberty.

=== P vs S victory ===
In 1996, PFC's legal work, led by Stephen Whittle, secured victory for the P vs S and Cornwall County Council case in the European Court of Justice (ECJ). It is the first piece of case law, anywhere in the world, which prevents discrimination in employment or vocational education because someone is trans.

P had been the manager of an educational establishment, but was dismissed after she informed her employer that she intended to undergo gender reassignment. A subsequent industrial tribunal agreed that P was indeed dismissed due to her gender reassignment. The tribunal did not, however, believe that she had a remedy under the Sex Discrimination Act (SDA). At the time, the SDA prohibited adverse treatment for men and women because they belonged to one sex or the other.

The tribunal asked the ECJ whether the Equal Treatment Directive – which states there should be "no discrimination whatsoever on grounds of sex" – applied where someone is changing or has changed their sex. In a landmark ruling, the ECJ made clear that changing sex is an aspect of sex: meaning dismissal related to gender reassignment is in breach of the Directive. As a member of the European Community, the UK is obliged to ensure UK law is always in accord with European Law (of which the Equal Treatment Directive is a part).

When P's case returned to the tribunal, her discrimination complaint was upheld and she was financially compensated.

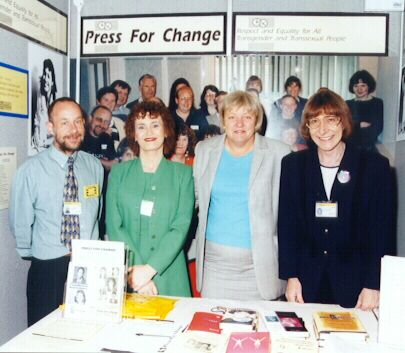
Press for Change with Mo Mowlam – 1 October 1997

The P vs S victory helped PFC gain support from journalists and led to the group's first face to face work with civil servants and ministers. Stephen Whittle provided legal analysis whilst Burns and Claire McNab pursued political areas of influence.

The ECJ judgment was in April 1996, but it wasn't until early 1998 (following the change of government) that the Department for Education and Employment (DfEE) decided to respond. The DfEE released a consultation on proposed legislation which asked, among other things, whether trans people should be allowed to work with children or vulnerable adults. Outraged, Burns urged PFC's followers to write to their MPs and also to Cherie Blair: a discrimination and public law specialist and wife to the then-Prime Minister, Tony Blair. More than 300 trans people and their supporters responded with a strong and unequivocal call to redraft the proposed legislation.

As a consequence, Burns was invited to meet Margaret Hodge MP, the Minister for Education and Employment in the new Labour Government. Amid difficult, ongoing negotiations, Burns and PFC's Claire McNab pushed to keep the new employment regulations as open as possible. Assessing their success, Burns gave PFC "seven out of ten".

To ensure that PFC campaigns remained focused and accountable, Burns wrote "Five Principles" for testing governmental action in May 1997 (right after the Labour Government came to power).

Burns has criticised mental health practitioners for bias against trans people. She asserts that some psychiatrists refer for surgery only those patients whom they consider attractive, and she was an early critic of the controversial 2003 book The Man Who Would Be Queen by J. Michael Bailey. She has also criticised research claiming that trans people are less happy after transition. In addition, Burns has advocated on behalf of trans youth and their families seeking medical intervention as minors.

=== Gender Recognition Act and MBE ===
Burns was one of PFC's principal negotiators with Ministers and Civil Servants during the drafting of, and tabling and debating, the Gender Recognition Bill.

She co-wrote PFC's 1999 submission to the Interdepartmental Working Group on Transsexualism set up by Jack Straw. The Working Group investigated the problems experienced by trans people in the UK and possible legislative solutions to them. The group disbanded after publishing a policy document in April 2000, a precursor to the Gender Recognition Bill. In a critique of the document, Burns wrote: "The report's authors, and the ministers approving the report for publication, also seem to have given us a tremendous amount of rope with which to hang the government and force it now to the final act in this saga of over thirty years".

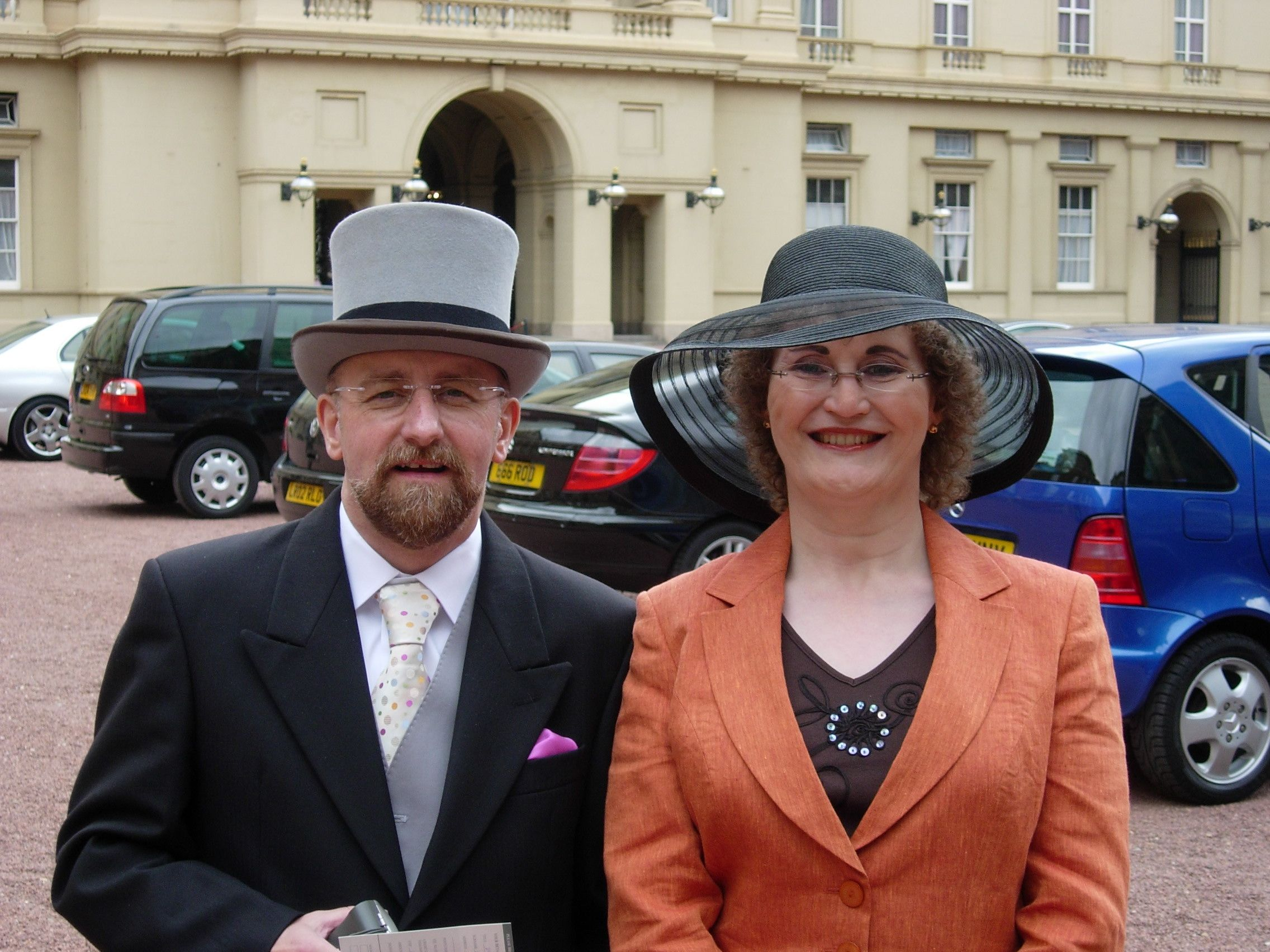
Stephen Whittle (OBE) and Christine Burns (MBE) at Buckingham Palace

For 2 years, the government took the issue no further. Then, in a judgment delivered at Strasbourg on 11 July 2002 in the case of Christine Goodwin v. the United Kingdom, the European Court of Human Rights held unanimously that:

- there had been a violation of Article 8 (right to respect for private and family life) of the European Convention on Human Rights;
- there had been a violation of Article 12 (right to marry and to found a family)

Following the ruling, the Home Office worked with PFC to develop the principles which would come to underpin the Gender Recognition Bill. Burns describes long hours "drafting and agreeing complex submissions within punishing deadlines that civil servants themselves would never put up with." Consequently, PFC had considerable input into what proved to be a crucial turning point in the battle for legal recognition of trans people. According to the Telegraph, ministers privately feared that the legal reforms would create a public outcry "similar to that caused by the repeal of Section 28".

Making use of the bill she had campaigned for, Burns was among the first to gain a certificate recognising her gender under the Gender Recognition Act 2004. She said: "For most it's been a profoundly personal thing – not something to shout about, but a piece of paper to hold, to have a little cry, and feel closure at last." Burns was honoured with an MBE the same year as Stephen Whittle for her efforts on behalf of trans people. Her lobbying was lauded by MP Gerald Kaufman, who described her as "brave and tenacious".

In 2007, she told the BBC about the rights which she helped win for trans people: "Back in 1992, when Press For Change was started, [trans people] had no employment rights, they couldn't marry, they had no right to privacy and all of those things have been achieved by changes in the law ... I'm a transsexual woman, I'm now regarded as being a woman in the eyes of the law, it means that affects my retirement age, it means that I can marry a man and it also provides me with considerable protection of my privacy. So, for instance, if I disclose my transsexual background to someone in an official capacity and that person then goes off and blabs to somebody else – then that's a criminal offence."

== Political work and departure from PFC ==
In 2005, Burns began to focus on the media and healthcare. She left PFC in November 2007 to pursue strategic issues with public officials and to mentor younger activists.

=== NHS and international health advisor ===
The Department of Health set up a Sexual Orientation Advisory Group (SOAG) in 2004. After lobbying from Press for Change, the Department of Health changed the name to the Sexual Orientation and Gender Identity Advisory Group (SOGIAG) to be more inclusive of trans needs and identities. Burns was invited to chair the transgender workstream of SOGIAG in 2005. As chair, she saw the need for research and official literature supportive of treatment and setting standards so, in 2006, she commissioned nine publications – ranging from guidance for GPs to advice for young people. Following this, the Department of Health commissioned her directly to write a resource for NHS managers and policymakers called "Trans: A Practical Guide for the NHS".

During her time as Chair (July 2006 – May 2010) Burns invited Charing Cross Gender Identity Clinic into discussions at SOGIAG and at the Parliamentary Forum on Transsexualism. In 2009, she interviewed Stuart Lorimer, a clinician at London's Charing Cross Gender Identity Clinic. The same year she was formally appointed to the Department of Health's Lesbian, Gay, Bisexual and Transgender Advisory Group.

In 2005, the North West public sector agencies, led by the Northwest Development Agency and Northwest Regional Assembly, began preparing a regional equality and diversity strategy. Burns became involved via a public engagement panel, which went on to become the North West Equality and Diversity Group (NWEDG). As NWEDG's chair, Burns also sat on the North West's Equality Strategy Group (ESG). Through NWEDG and ESG, she helped set up an annual regional celebration of diversity called "Celebr8, Don't Discrimin8". The campaign included a series of short films, some of which are available on YouTube.

She was invited to consult on a number of projects for NHS Northwest, including research and analysis leading to the publication of "A Landscape of the Region", (which she wrote for the SHA). She subsequently became the programme manager for the health authority's Equality and Diversity team in 2009. She has worked on a series of resources for lesbian, gay, bisexual and transgender people including an LGBT history timeline, monitoring guidelines and a GP benchmarking tool, Pride in Practice. On the importance of the LGBT timeline, Christine said: "Knowing our histories might just make life a bit easier for our communities to have role models and assure our place in organisations like the NHS." She was also directly involved in the creation of the first performance management framework for equality outcomes in the NHS, the Equality Performance Improvement Toolkit (EPIT) and the NHS's competency framework for leadership of equality and diversity.

The UK LGBT Health Summits

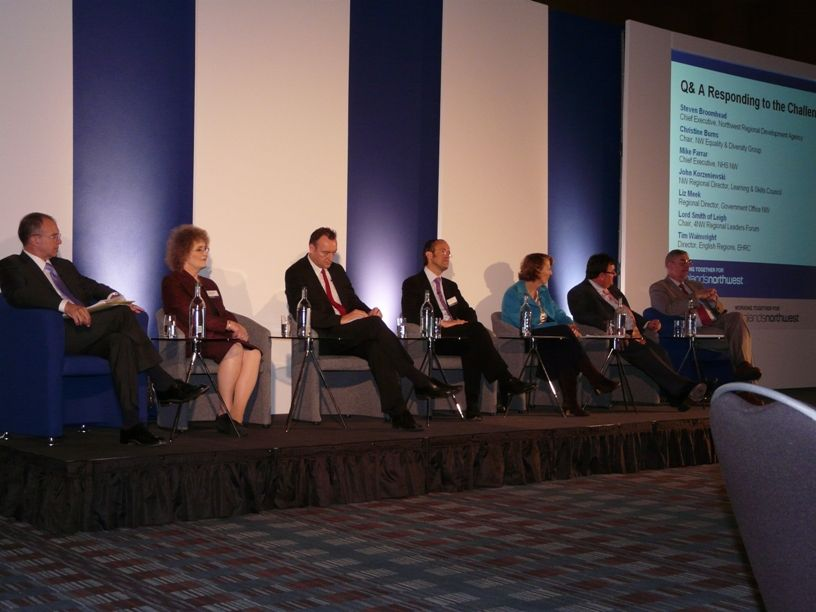
Christine Burns MBE with NW Regional Agency Leaders

The first UK LGBT Health Summit was held in London in 2006 with over 160 healthcare professionals, voluntary and statutory sector professionals, activists, community organisers and grass roots campaigners. The LGBT Health Summit grew out of SOGIAG's work with the Department of Health and Burns, among others, secured proper trans involvement from the start. She was co-chair of the LGBT Health Summit 2010, and produced a mini documentary for the occasion.

Her recognised leadership and knowledge of trans people in healthcare was recognised by the World Professional Association for Transgender Health (WPATH), which invited Burns to be the British representative on its international advisory panel. The panel had influence over the Standards of Care for the Health of Transsexual, Transgender, and Gender Nonconforming People's seventh edition. It also made advisory input to the submissions WPATH have made to the International Classification of Diseases revision process in the World Health Organisation.

=== Media reform ===
Burns has advocated for better media depiction of trans people, including Hayley Cropper on Coronation Street and Nadia Almada on Big Brother. In December 1998, Julie Hesmondhlagh, the actress who plays Hayley, agreed to become Press for Change's official patron.

Under Burns's leadership, PFC developed professional relationships with journalists, filmmakers, and regulatory bodies and responded to offensive news items "responsibly and constructively". In later years, she became increasingly involved in behind the scenes work: appearing on television and radio as a campaign spokesperson and consulting at production level.

She also supported people who were dealing with the media, including Councillor Ros Mitchell, who transitioned whilst sitting on Bristol's County Council. Mitchell faced unwanted press intrusion from her local newspaper in addition to criticism from the Guardian. During the spring of 1998, Burns collaborated in a BBC Home Ground programme (made by BBC Bristol) which documented Mitchell's transition. Writing on the PFC website, Burns claimed that an angry Labour Councillor threatened a BBC Politics correspondent with physical violence during production.

In 1999, Sergeant Major Joanne Rushton revealed her intention to transition from male to female – prompting Britain's Ministry of Defence to announce that transgender people would be allowed to serve in the Armed Forces. Burns welcomed the news, but expressed concern about the Army's possible reaction to Sergeant Major Rushton entering into a relationship: "Joanne will physically be a woman but legally be a man ... Given the Army's ban on homosexuality, it is not clear whether she will be allowed to have sexual relations with a man or a woman – if anyone."

In 2004, she responded to the BBC's coverage of murdered trans man Brandon Teena with a campaign to change editorial guidelines around gendered pronouns. Burns brought Tim Toulmin before the Parliamentary Forum shortly before he was promoted to the head of the Press Complaints Commission. She also researched and produced the PFC report "Transsexual People and the Press", which led the Press Complaints Commission to change its Editors' Code of Practice. Following the media frenzy around Thomas Beatie's pregnancy in 2008, Burns defended the right of trans men to bear children: "That's like saying you can't be a woman and have a career ... The irony is we've had a debate in feminism about the idea that if men were able to have children we would be in a very different position and yet when it happens there is enormous fear."

=== LGBT History Month and public speaking ===
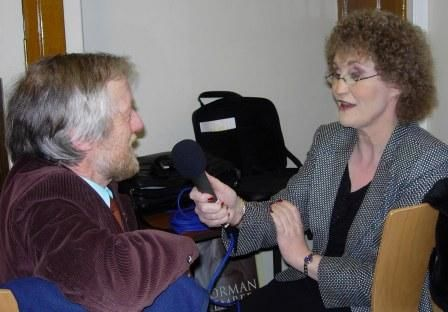
Mark Rees interviewed by Christine Burns MBE in 2008

In 2005, Burns became involved in supporting LGBT History Month and contributed profiles on Mark Rees and Stephen Whittle to the charity's website. She also produced a lesson plan on gender variance. She has recounted key moments in her work as a trans activist on the site, including PFC's trip to Downing Street and Alex Carlile's private member's bill proposing means to correct transgender people's birth certificates and status in the mid-1990s. Burns was invited to become a Patron of LGBT History Month in 2010, making her the educational campaign's first trans patron.

Burns spoke at a conference on trans issues organised by the University of East Anglia in 2007. In 2008, she was a keynote speaker at a conference held by the Trans Resource and Empowerment Centre and the Centre for Local Policy Studies. At the Commission for Social Care Inspection conference in 2007, she explained that trans service users, relatives, professional stakeholders, and care staff are often vulnerable and require protection from abuse.

Burns introduced podcasts to the PFC web site when the term was largely unheard of, and continued to broadcast on the site til her departure in 2007. In 2008, she presented the first season of Just Plain Sense, her personal podcasts detailing a variety of equality and diversity topics from contemporary Britain. One of her earliest guests was Lynne Jones MP, the original chair of the Parliamentary Forum on Transsexualism in the 1990s.

=== Pink List recognition ===
Burns appeared at 96 on Time Out magazine's Pride Power List 2011 – a compilation of influential lesbian, gay, bisexual, and transgender people. She was the only trans person on the list and was placed between singer George Michael and pantomime dame Christopher Biggins. In her blog, Burns responded by critiquing such lists as subjective and divisive. Nevertheless, the following year The Independent on Sunday positioned her as the second highest ranking trans person on its annual Pink List.

== Selected publications ==
- Burns, C., (1994), What do transsexuals have for breakfast? GENDYS '94, The Third International Gender Dysphoria Conference, Manchester, England.
- Burns, Christine (1999). If That's Your Idea of Non-Discrimination. In Tracie O' Keefe (ed.) Sex, Gender and Sexuality: 21st Century Transformations. Extraordinary People Press, ISBN 0-9529482-2-2
- Burns, Christine (2003). The Second Transition. In Tracie O' Keefe and Katrina Fox (eds.) Finding the Real Me: True Tales of Sex and Gender Diversity. Wiley, ISBN 0-7879-6547-2
- Burns, Christine (2004). Transsexual People and the Press: Collected Opinions from Transsexual People Themselves. Press for Change, November 2004
- Ali, S., Burns, C. and Grant, L. (2012), Equality and diversity in the health service: An evidence-led culture change. J of Psych Issues in Org Culture, 3: 41–60. doi: 10.1002/jpoc.20095
- Burns, Christine, ed. (January 2018). Trans Britain: Our Long Journey from the Shadows. Unbound. ISBN 978-1783524716.
