= Rebecca Allison =

American cardiologist (1946–2024)

- Born: December 21, 1946; Greenwood, Mississippi, U.S.
- Died: August 11, 2024 (aged 77)
- Education: University of Mississippi Medical Center
- Occupation: Cardiologist
- Employer: Private practice
- Known for: Transgender activism

Rebecca Anne Allison (December 21, 1946 - August 11, 2024) was an American cardiologist and transgender activist. She served as president of the Gay and Lesbian Medical Association and as Chair of the American Medical Association's Advisory Committee on Lesbian, Gay, Bisexual, and Transgender Issues.

== Life ==
Allison was born in Greenwood, Mississippi, to Errol Ward Atkinson and Mabel Blackwell Atkinson. She transitioned in 1993 while living in Jackson, Mississippi. She died on August 11, 2024.

== Career ==
Allison graduated magna cum laude from the University of Mississippi Medical Center in 1971. After practicing internal medicine, she returned to school in 1985 to study cardiology, working in that field beginning in 1987. Later, she moved to Phoenix, Arizona, for a position with CIGNA and served as their chief of cardiology from 1998 to 2012, when she entered private practice. Phoenix Magazine named Allison one of the "Top Doctors" in Phoenix for 2006, 2007, and 2008. Allison retired from medical practice in 2018.

== Activism ==
In 1998, Allison created an online resource site focusing on the medical, legal, and spiritual needs of transgender people. The website included a compilation of statutes for amending sex on a birth certificate, a brochure on facial feminization surgery, criticism of the controversial 2003 book The Man Who Would Be Queen by J. Michael Bailey, and a section on spirituality. Allison's website was cited by several publications on LGBTQ health care and LGBTQ rights. She was president of the Gay and Lesbian Medical Association, as well as Chair of the American Medical Association Advisory Committee on Gay, Lesbian, Bisexual, and Transgender Issues, and assisted in the passage of AMA Resolution 22, "Removing Financial Barriers to Care for Transgender Patients." Allison was also active in Soulforce and organized the Phoenix Transgender Day of Remembrance annually with her partner Margaux Schaffer.

== Selected publications ==
- Allison RA (2007). Transsexualism. In Fink G (ed.) Encyclopedia of Stress (2nd Edition). Elsevier, ISBN 978-0-12-088503-9
- Allison RA (2007). Transsexualism. In Pfaff D, Arnold A, Etgen A, Fahrbach S, Rubin R (eds.) Hormones, Brain, and Behavior (2nd Edition). Elsevier, ISBN 978-0-12-532104-4
