= John Derbyshire =

American paleoconservative (born 1945)

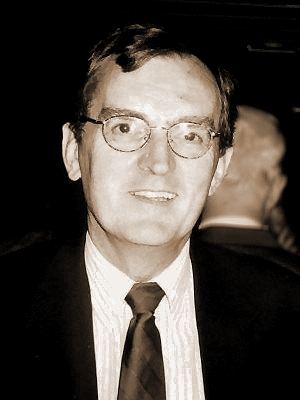
- Derbyshire in June 2001
- Born: 3 June 1945 (age 81); Northampton, Northamptonshire, England, United Kingdom
- Citizenship: United States
- Education: University College London, University of London
- Occupations: Computer programmer, journalist, political commentator
- Website: JohnDerbyshire.com

John Derbyshire (born 3 June 1945) is an American journalist and political commentator. He was one of the last paleoconservatives at the National Review, until he was fired in 2012 for writing an article for Taki's Magazine that was widely described as racist. Since 2012 he has written for white nationalist website VDARE.

In the article that caused his firing, Derbyshire suggested that white and East Asian parents should talk to their children about the threats posed to their safety by black people. He also recommended that parents tell their children not to live in predominantly black communities. He included the line "If planning a trip to a beach or amusement park at some date, find out whether it is likely to be swamped with blacks on that date."

He has also written for the New English Review. His columns cover political-cultural topics, including immigration, China, history, mathematics, and race. Derbyshire's 1996 novel about Chinese American immigrants, Seeing Calvin Coolidge in a Dream, was a New York Times "Notable Book of the Year". His 2004 non-fiction book Prime Obsession won the Mathematical Association of America's inaugural Euler Book Prize. A political book, We Are Doomed: Reclaiming Conservative Pessimism, was released in September 2009.

== Early life ==
Derbyshire attended the Northampton School for Boys and graduated from University College London, of the University of London, where he studied mathematics. Before turning to writing full-time, he worked on Wall Street as a computer programmer.

== Career ==
=== National Review ===
Derbyshire worked as a writer at National Review until he was terminated in 2012 because of an article published in Taki's Magazine that was widely perceived as racist.

Derbyshire began writing for the far-right website VDARE in May 2012. In his first column for the website, Derbyshire wrote "White supremacy, in the sense of a society in which key decisions are made by white Europeans, is one of the better arrangements History has come up with."

=== Mathematics ===
Derbyshire's book Prime Obsession: Bernhard Riemann and the Greatest Unsolved Problem in Mathematics was first published in hardcover in 2003 and then paperback in 2004. It focuses on the Riemann hypothesis, one of the Millennium Problems. The book is aimed, as Derbyshire puts it in his prologue, "at the intelligent and curious but nonmathematical reader ..."

Prime Obsession explores such topics as complex numbers, field theory, the prime number theorem, the zeta function, the harmonic series, and others. The biographical sections give relevant information about the lives of mathematicians who worked in these areas, including Euler, Gauss, Lejeune Dirichlet, Lobachevsky, Chebyshev, Vallée-Poussin, Hadamard, as well as Riemann himself.

In 2006, Joseph Henry Press, an imprint of the National Academies Press, published another Derbyshire book of popular mathematics: Unknown Quantity: A Real And Imaginary History of Algebra.

=== Role in Way of the Dragon ===
Derbyshire had an uncredited role in Way of the Dragon (released in the United States as Return of the Dragon), a 1972 martial arts film directed by and starring, actor and martial artist Bruce Lee. Of landing the part, Derbyshire said: "The casting director had obviously just trawled around the low-class guesthouses for unemployed foreigners of a sufficiently thuggish appearance."

== Views ==
Derbyshire writes in general from a small government conservative perspective. He notably ridiculed George W. Bush's "itty-bitty tax cut, paid for by dumping a slew of federal debt on your children and grandchildren," derided Bush as too sure of his religious convictions and for his "rich-kid-ness". He has noted that small-government conservatism is unlikely to ever take hold in the United States (although he is personally sympathetic to it), called for immediate U.S. withdrawal from Iraq (but favoured the invasion), opposed market reforms or any other changes in Social Security, supported legal access to abortion, supported euthanasia in a fairly wide range of circumstances, and suggested that he might (in a time of international crisis) vote for Hillary Clinton as president. Derbyshire wrote about American schooling in his book We Are Doomed, "Education is a vast sea of lies, waste, corruption, crackpot theorizing, and careerist log-rolling." He further argued that people "had better brace ourselves for the catastrophe" coming as a result.

Derbyshire once argued that America would be better off if women did not have the right to vote.

Derbyshire was one of the inaugural speakers at the H.L. Mencken Club, a far-right club formed by Paul Gottfried and Richard B. Spencer, and has spoken at the group several additional times. The H.L. Mencken Club has been described by the Southern Poverty Law Center as a white nationalist organization.

=== Conflicts with National Review ===
Derbyshire differed from other writers at National Review magazine on many subjects. For example, Derbyshire supported Michael Schiavo's position in the Terri Schiavo case. Derbyshire's views on the Schiavo case attracted criticism from colleagues such as Ramesh Ponnuru. The Derbyshire–Ponnuru dispute arose again over Ponnuru's 2006 book The Party of Death. Derbyshire reviewed the book harshly in the New English Review, and Ponnuru replied on National Review Online.

Though Derbyshire broadly agreed with other writers at National Review Online on immigration, he encountered strong opposition from former National Review Online blogger John Podhoretz, who described Derbyshire's comments on restricting immigration to maintain "ethnic balance" in severe terms: "But maintaining 'ethnic balance' is not fine. It is chillingly, horrifyingly not fine."

== Personal life ==
Derbyshire has been married to Lynette Rose Derbyshire, a Chinese immigrant, since 1986. The couple were married in the city of Jilin, in Jilin Province, northeast China, and have a daughter and a son. He has lived in Long Island, New York since 1992. In early 2012, he underwent treatment for chronic lymphocytic leukaemia.

== Published works ==
- Seeing Calvin Coolidge in a Dream (St. Martin's Griffin, 1997) ISBN 0-312-15649-9
- Prime Obsession: Bernhard Riemann and the Greatest Unsolved Problem in Mathematics (Plume Books, 2003) ISBN 0-452-28525-9
- Unknown Quantity: A Real And Imaginary History of Algebra (Joseph Henry Press, 2006) ISBN 0-309-09657-X
- We Are Doomed: Reclaiming Conservative Pessimism (Crown Forum, 2009) ISBN 0-307-40958-9, ISBN 978-0-307-40958-4
- From the Dissident Right (Vdare Books, 2013) ISBN 978-1304001542

He has also written numerous articles for various publications, including National Review, The New Criterion, The American Conservative and The Washington Times.

Derbyshire recorded a weekly podcast called "Radio Derb," from 2004 to 2025, in which he comments on current events. The podcast was hosted on the National Review website before being moved to Taki's Magazine. It was later hosted on VDARE and then the ZBlog. The podcast was the longest running paleoconservative podcast at the time of its completion with 1000 episodes (over 600 hours of content).
