= Andrea James =

American writer, film producer, director, and activist (born 1967)

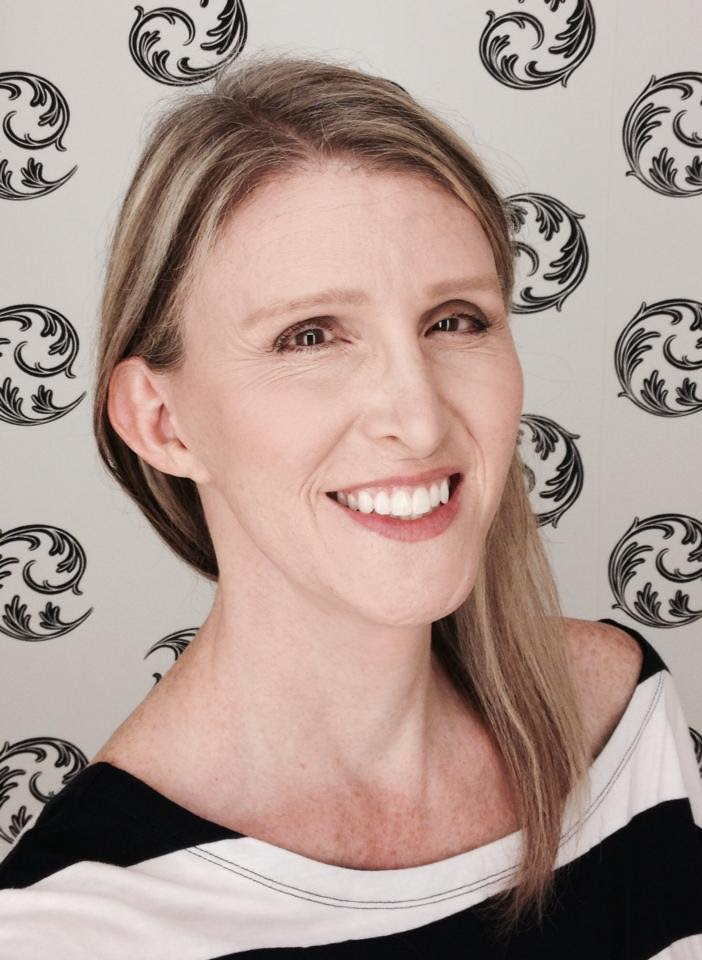
- Born: January 16, 1967 (age 59)
- Education: Wabash College (BA); University of Chicago (MA)
- Occupations: Producer, writer, activist
- Website: andreajames.com

Andrea Jean James (born January 16, 1967) is an American transgender rights activist, film producer, and blogger.

Herself a transgender woman, James has been a leading figure in protests against the work of sexologists including Ray Blanchard and J. Michael Bailey who she argues engage in the academic exploitation of transgender people. Her tactics—which include targeting the families of those she opposes—have been described by critics as intimidation and harassment.

James runs the website Transgender Map, which contains advice for transgender people, as well as extensive information about those she considers anti-trans.

== Education and career ==
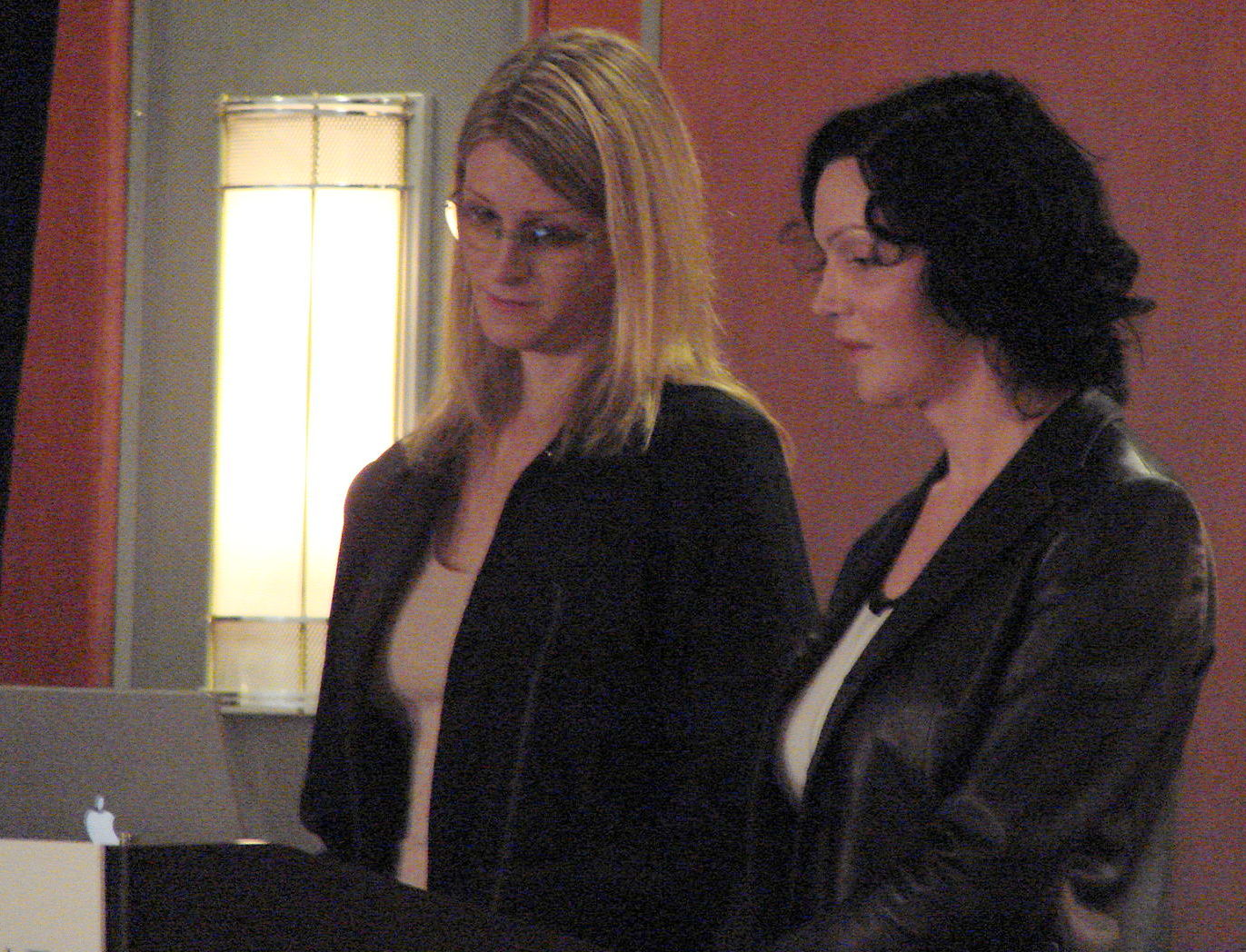
James and Calpernia Addams at the Out and Equal Workplace Summit, 2006

James grew up in Franklin, Indiana, and attended Wabash College, where she majored in English, Latin, and Greek. After graduating in 1989, she obtained an M.A. in English language and literature from the University of Chicago. After college, James worked in advertising, first for several years at the Chicago Tribune, then for a decade at DDB Chicago. It was while working there that she transitioned. By 1999, she created Transsexual Road Map (later renamed Transgender Map), an online resource for the transgender community.

James moved to Los Angeles in 2003 and co-founded Deep Stealth Productions with her roommate, author and entertainer Calpernia Addams, to create content by and for transgender people. They filmed an instructional video, Finding Your Female Voice, to offer voice coaching to trans women, and in 2004 produced and performed in the first all-transgender cast of The Vagina Monologues, debuting a new piece created by Eve Ensler for the occasion. James was also a co-producer of and appeared in Beautiful Daughters, a documentary film about the event. According to her website, her work in film has continued, and as of December 2023 she has directed at least 11 videos, shorts, or TV series, and acted as a consultant on many more.

James has served on the boards of nonprofits TransYouth Family Allies and Outfest. She writes about consumer rights, technology, pop culture, and LGBTQ rights on her website, and she has contributed to Boing Boing, QuackWatch, eMedicine, The Advocate, The Huffington Post and Wikipedia.

== Activism ==
=== Protests against The Man Who Would Be Queen ===
Together with Lynn Conway and Deirdre McCloskey, James was a driving figure in protests—notable for their implications for academic freedom and freedom of speech—against J. Michael Bailey's book The Man Who Would Be Queen (2003). In the book, Bailey argues that there are two forms of transsexualism: one a variant of male homosexuality, and the other a male sexual interest in having a female body, a taxonomy critics see as inaccurate and damaging. James argued that Bailey's work was unscientific with "roots in the eugenics movement," and portrayed gender variant behavior as a psychosexual pathology.

Bailey was accused of unethical behavior, including that he had performed research without consent, that he had outed transgender women, and that he had practiced psychology without a license—allegations which a later investigation found to be baseless. In the midst of the protests against the book, which involved a petition drive and the organized submission of formal complaints, the book's Lambda Literary Award nomination was rescinded, and Bailey stepped down from his role as chair of the Northwestern University psychology department. Although some praised the protests as successful action against the academic exploitation of transgender people, others viewed them as intimidation and harassment.

Alice Dreger, an intersex rights activist and a colleague of Bailey's at Northwestern University whose investigation into the controversy was featured in Archives of Sexual Behavior, found that the allegations against Bailey were baseless, and she criticized James for satirizing Bailey with a page on her website with photographs of Bailey's children alongside sexually explicit captions, including calling his 5-year-old daughter a "cock-starved exhibitionist", apparently as a critique of Bailey's descriptions of transsexual children in his book. Dreger described James's actions as intimidation and argued that James was motivated by scorn for anyone who disagreed with the "woman trapped in a man's body" narrative of trans identity, referencing the "surprisingly large number" of emails she received from transgender women alleging that James had also harassed them for sharing their stories.

Outside of the transgender community and sexology researchers, this controversy is largely notable because of its implications for academic freedom and freedom of speech. Some critics of Bailey argue that the protests represent legitimate comment on a topic of public interest. In a comment to The New York Times, McCloskey said "Nothing we have done, I believe, and certainly nothing I have done, overstepped any boundaries of fair comment on a book and an author who stepped into the public arena with enthusiasm to deliver a false and unscientific and politically damaging opinion.” Bailey's defenders disagree: In the same The New York Times article, Dreger said, "If we're going to have research at all, then we're going to have people saying unpopular things, and if this is what happens to them, then we've got problems not only for science but free expression itself."

=== Transgender Map ===
Andrea James runs the website Transgender Map (originally named Transsexual Road Map), which contains resources and advice for transgender people as well as information about people she sees as anti-trans.

== See also ==
- List of Wikipedia people
  - User:Jokestress, Andrea's Wikipedia account
