= The Party of Death =

2006 book by Ramesh Ponnuru

- Author: Ramesh Ponnuru
- Language: English
- Subject: Right to life, Abortion, Euthanasia, and the Democratic Party.
- Publisher: Regnery Publishing
- Publication date: April 24, 2006
- Publication place: United States
- Media type: Print (Hardcover)
- Pages: 320
- ISBN: 1-59698-004-4
- OCLC: 65063705
- Dewey Decimal: 363.46 22
- LC Class: HQ767.5.U5 P66 2006

The Party of Death: The Democrats, the Media, the Courts, and the Disregard for Human Life is a book by Ramesh Ponnuru. The hardcover edition, published by Regnery Publishing, was released on April 24, 2006, and consists of 320 pages. Controversially titled, the work is an exposition on such right to life issues as abortion and euthanasia, concentrating on the United States Democratic Party's shift from anti-abortion to abortion rights.

== Reviews ==
Jonah Goldberg, at the time NRO Editor at Large, claims that "Ponnuru scrupulously sticks to nonreligious arguments, accessible to everyone. But that hasn't stopped critics from charging that his motives are unacceptably 'religious,' while others have complained Ponnuru is too coldly rational. Again it seems Ponnuru's real sin isn't how he says things, but that he says them at all."

John Derbyshire writes: "RTL is made as presentable as possible in Party of Death, with writing that is engaging and lucid.... RTL-ers are welcoming Party of Death very joyfully, though, and they are right to do so, as it is an exceptionally fine piece of polemical writing in support of their... cause.... Party of Death is obviously inspired by religious belief. The philosophical passages strictly follow the Golden Rule of religious apologetics, which is: The conclusion is known in advance, and the task of the intellectual is to erect supporting arguments."

Possibly in response to these accusations of having an overtly religious viewpoint in approaching the issue, Ponnuru himself addressed the issue head on: "I have made a show of reasoning, but my conclusions have all rather conveniently lined up with the teachings of my church.... For the record, my views on abortion have not changed since I was an agnostic.... It is true that I am a Catholic. It is also true that I believe that my church's teaching on abortion is reasonable, sound, and correct. It is because I came to believe that Catholicism is true, after all, that I became a Catholic. If I didn't believe Catholic teachings were true, I wouldn't be a Catholic. So what?"

== Publicity ==
The Daily Show host Jon Stewart interviewed Ponnuru on May 17, 2006, as part of promotional tour for his book. The Colbert Report host Stephen Colbert interviewed Ponnuru on August 14, 2006.
