= Stephen Whittle =

British scholar and activist

Stephen Whittle OBE FAcSS
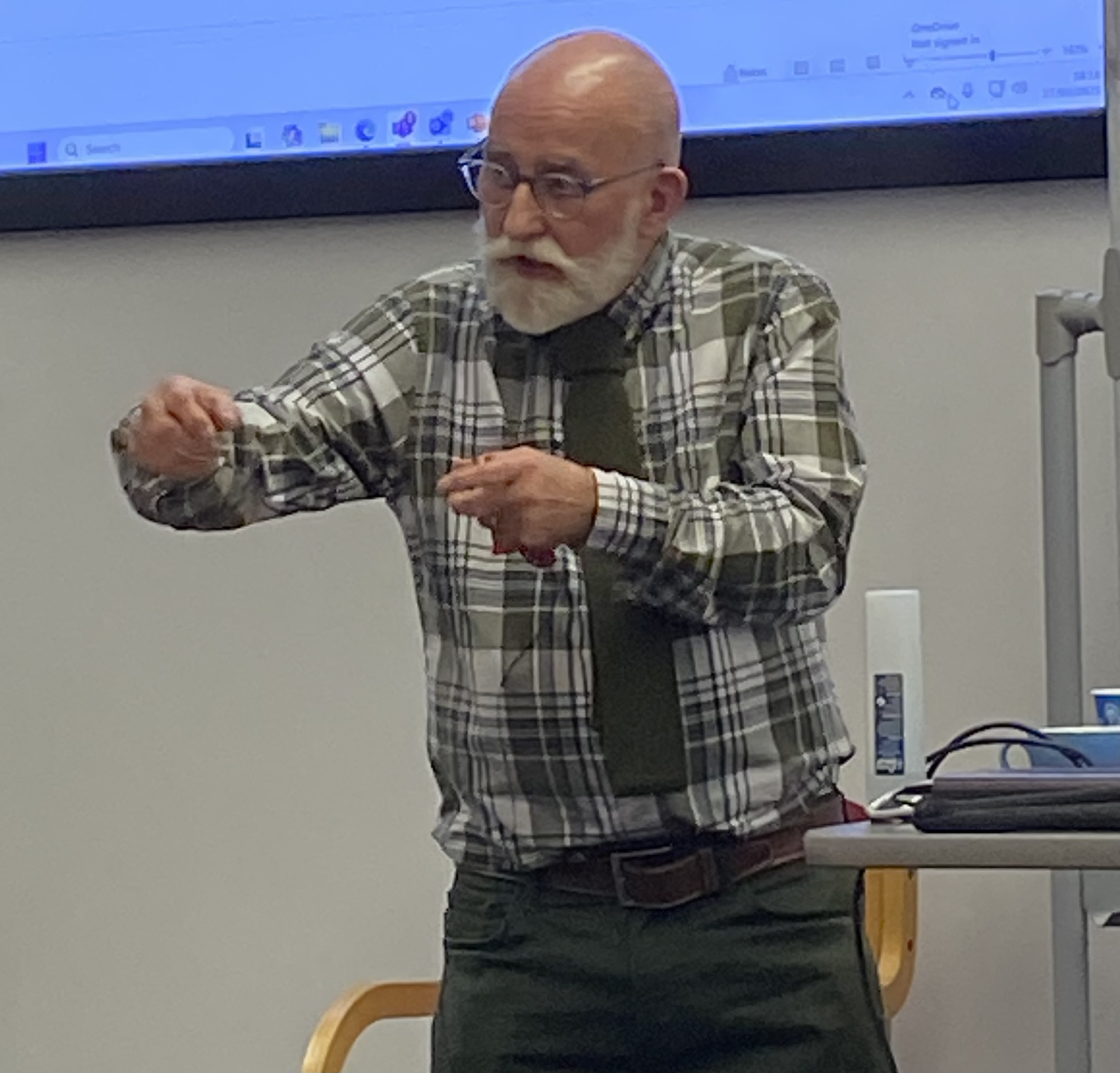
- Stephen Whittle in 2025
- Born: 29 May 1955 (age 71); Altrincham, Cheshire, England, UK
- Known for: Equal rights for transgender people activism
- Title: Professor of Law
- Spouse: Sarah Rutherford
- Children: 4

Stephen Thomas Whittle (born 29 May 1955) is a British legal scholar and activist with the transgender activist group Press for Change. Since 2007, he has been Professor of Equalities Law in the School of Law at Manchester Metropolitan University. Between 2007 and 2009, he was president of the World Professional Association for Transgender Health (WPATH). Having been assigned female at birth, he is described as "a radical lesbian before his sex change and now a leading commentator on gender issues", who after the Gender Recognition Act 2004 came into force in April 2005, achieved legal recognition as a man and so was able to marry his female partner.

== Early life ==
Whittle was born on 29 May 1955 at Altrincham Cottage Hospital, Cheshire, where his grandmother was a senior nurse. He was assigned female at birth. He was a sickly child, suffering from rickets. He was the middle child of the five children in his family. In 1955 the family lived in Wythenshawe. At that time, Wythenshawe was said to be the biggest council estate in Europe, providing workers for the Trafford Park estate. After several years of sun lamp treatment for his rickets, at St Mary's Hospital, he was considered well enough to attend Havely Hay Primary school at the age of five. In 1963, the family moved to Withington village, an inner suburb of Manchester. From the age of eight he attended Old Moat Junior school.

In 1966 his mother, Barbara Elizabeth Whittle (née Stead), being concerned at how different he was from his sisters, entered him in the examination for Withington Girls' School. Being one of the highest scorers in the city in the eleven-plus exam that year, he received a scholarship to attend. It was during his time at Withington Girls' School that he started reading medical books. He knew he was romantically attracted to other girls at school – he never told them, and so his love was not reciprocated – but he also knew that he was sexually attracted to men. On top of that was a strong desire to be a man, to grow a beard and to have a hairy chest. He had read articles about people like Della Aleksander and April Ashley who had had a sex change. At the age of 17, whilst visiting his doctor about a sore throat he read about a trans man.

== Transgender rights campaigning ==
In 1974 Whittle came out as a trans man, after returning from a women's Liberation Conference in Edinburgh, which he attended as a member of the Manchester Lesbian Collective. He began hormone replacement therapy in 1975. He has been active in transsexual and transgender communities since the age of twenty when in 1975 he joined the Manchester TV/TS group which had been started in 1972/3 by two trans women the very first support group for transsexual people in the United Kingdom. In 1979 he joined a former Army officer and then royal sculptor, Judy Couzins, a trans woman in the Self Help Association for Transsexuals (SHAFT).

In 1989, he founded the UK's FTM Network which he coordinated until November 2007. In 1992, along with Mark Rees, the actress Myka Scott and an airline pilot Krystyna Sheffield, he founded and became vice-president of Press for Change that works to change the laws and social attitudes surrounding transgender and transsexual lives. Whittle remains as one of the vice-presidents (there is no president, as it is a consensus group), and Press for Change was called "one of the most successful lobby groups seen in the last 25 years" by Lord Alex Carlile, Baron Carlile of Berriew as early as 1994 at the reading of his Gender Reassignment Bill. The bill failed but "for 40 minutes members of parliament discussed trans people which without it, would have never happened." Whittle underwent phalloplasty surgeries from 2001 to 2003. The Channel 4 documentary Make me a Man followed his life during the surgeries.

Though unable to marry legally in the United Kingdom until the passing of the Gender Recognition Act 2004, he and his partner (now wife), Sarah Rutherford, have four children by artificial insemination. Whittle wrote in Disembodied Law: Trans People's Legal(Outer) Space, "I face an inadequate legal framework in which to exist. We are simply 'not' within a world that only permits two sexes, only allows two forms of gender role, gender identity or expression. Always falling outside of the 'norm' our lives become less, our humanity is questioned, and our oppression is legitimized." The Whittles' efforts to gain recognition of Stephen as their children's legal father led to X, Y and Z v. The United Kingdom before the European Court of Human Rights in 1996. When the Gender Recognition Act 2004 came into force in April 2005, Whittle obtained a new, male birth certificate. He then married Sarah (née Rutherford) later that year. They had been cohabiting since 1979. They have four children by artificial insemination, the first of whom was born on 13 October 1992. In April 2006, they jointly adopted the children, making Whittle their legal father.

He has written and spoken extensively on his personal journey, most notably in his autobiographical statement in Will Self's essay for David Gamble's photography collection 'Perfidious Man.' His writings have included, among other things, an article on the ground-breaking transsexual employment discrimination case decided on by the European Court of Justice. In 2005 he was awarded The Sylvia Rivera Award for Transgender Studies by the Center for Lesbian and Gay Studies for the monograph 'Respect and Equality.' In 2007, along with his co-editor, Susan Stryker, he was awarded a Lambda Literary Award for their annotated collection of 50 key historical and contemporary transgender science, political and theory texts; 'The Transgender Studies Reader'.

In 2002, Whittle was diagnosed with multiple sclerosis. Having experienced a variety of health problems since his early 20s, he had had suspicions and was neither surprised nor terrified by the diagnosis. His multiple sclerosis has been an increasing problem since late 2005, yet he continues in his full-time university post, and his fight for the human rights of trans people throughout the world. In recent years, he has collaborated with other members; Paisley Currah, Shannon Minter and Alyson Meiselmann, of the World Professional Association of Transgender Health (WPATH) on amicus briefs to courts in many jurisdictions. In 2007, he was the first non-medical professional and first trans person to become President of WPATH. Whittle continues to write extensively on the law and policy surrounding transsexual and transgender people, along with several recent academic articles returning to the question of the law and trans people. He also continues to work on what he hopes will be the defining history of transgender, and the sources of the many theories surrounding gender variant people. Throughout his life he has maintained an interest in the avant-garde of the arts, and has started to collaborate with Sara Davidmann, a photographer and Lecturer in Fine Art at Wimbledon College of Art.

In early 2007, the research report Engendered Penalties: Transsexual and Transgender People’s Experience of Inequality and Discrimination was instrumental in ensuring the inclusion of trans people in the remit of the new Commission for Equalities and Human Rights.

== Honours ==
In 2002, Whittle was given the Human Rights Award by the Civil Rights group Liberty, for his commitment and dedication to ensuring the advancement of rights for transsexual people through judicial means in the UK, Europe, and around the world.

In the 2005 New Year Honours, he was appointed Officer of the Order of the British Empire (OBE) "for services to Gender Issues".

In 2006, he was awarded the Virginia Prince Lifetime Achievement Award by the USA's International Federation for Gender Education.

In March 2015, Whittle was elected a Fellow of the Academy of Social Sciences (FAcSS).

== Roles ==
- Press for Change founder and Vice-president
- FTM Network , co-coordinator
- Professor of Equalities Law at Manchester Metropolitan University.

== Writings ==
=== Books ===
- (with Turner, L.) (2007) Engendered Penalties: Transsexual and Transgender Experience of Inequality and Discrimination by Trans People, London: Cabinet Office
- (with Stryker, S., eds) (2006) A Transgender Studies Reader, New York & London: Taylor & Francis: Routledge
- (2002) Respect and Equality: Transsexual and Transgender Rights, London: Cavendish Publishing
- (2000) The Transgender Debate: The Crisis Surrounding Gender Identities, Reading: South Street Press
- (with More K, eds) (1999) Reclaiming Genders: Transsexual Grammars at the fin de siecle, London: Cassell Publishing
- (with McMullen. M.) (1998), The Transvestite, the Transsexual and the Law (4th edition); 1996 London: Beaumont Trust (3rd Edition); 1995 London: Beaumont Trust, (2nd Edition); 1994 London: The Gender Trust ( 1st Edition.)
- ed. (1994), The Margins of the City: Gay Men's Urban Lives, Hampshire: Arena Press, Hampshire

=== Chapters in books ===
- (2007) Transsexual people in the Military, In J. Barrett ed. The Practical Management of Adult Disorders of Gender Identity, Oxford: Radcliffe Publishing
- (2007) The Gender Recognition Act 2004, In J. Barrett ed. The Practical Management of Adult Disorders of Gender Identity, Oxford: Radcliffe Publishing
- (2006) Impossible People: Viewing the Self-portraits of Transsexual People in A. Rogers ed. Parody, Pastiche and the Politics of Art: Materiality in a Post-material Paradigm, University of Central England in Birmingham in association with Ikon Gallery
- (with Watson, K.) (2004) Slicing Through Healthy Bodies: The media of body modification In M. King and K.Watson, Representing Health: Discourses of health and illness in the media London: Palgrave pp. 104–136. pages: 35
- (2005) Sustaining Values: Feminist Investments in the Transgender Body, In Y.W. Haschemi and B. Michaelis, eds.. Quer durch die Geisteswissenschaften. Perspektiven der Queer Theory. Berlin: Querverlag, pp. 157–168, pages: 10

=== Journal articles ===
- (2007) "Respectively a Man and a Woman": The Failures of the Gender Recognition Act 2005 and the Civil Partnership Act 2005, Lesbian and Gay Psychology Review Lesbian & Gay Psychology Review, Vol.8, no.1, Spring
- (with Turner, L.) (2007)'Sex changes'? Paradigm shifts in 'sex' and 'gender' following the Gender Recognition Act?’"'Sex Changes'? Paradigm Shifts in 'Sex' and 'Gender' Following the Gender Recognition Act?", Sociological Research Online, Volume 12, Issue 1, January
- (2006) 'The opposite of sex is politics – the UK Gender Recognition Act and why it is not perfect, just like you and me' Journal of Gender Studies Taylor & Francis - Fostering human progress through knowledge, Volume 15, Number 3, November.
- (with Witten, T.M.) (2004) 'TransPanthers: The Greying of Transgender and the Law', Deakin Law Review Deakin Law Review, 4(2) pp. 503–522
- (with Hartley, C.F.) (2003) 'Different Sexed and Gendered Bodies Demand Different ways of Thinking About Policy and Practice, Practice', A Journal of the British Association of Social Workers, 15(3) pp. 61–73
- (with Poole, L., Stephens, P.) (2002) 'Working with Transgendered and Transsexual People as Offenders in the Probation Service' Probation Journal Probation Journal, 49(3) pp 227–232
- (with Little, C., Stephens, P.) (2002)'The Praxis and Politics of Policing: Problems Facing Transgender People' QUT Law & Justice Journal QUT | Law | QUT Law and Justice Journal, 2(2)
- (1999) 'New’isms: Transsexual People and Institutionalised Discrimination in Employment Law' Contemporary Issues in Law, 4(3), pp 31–53.
- (1998) 'The Trans-Cyberian Mail Way' Journal of Social and Legal Studies , 7(3), pp 389–408
- (1998) 'Editorial' in The Journal of Gender Studies Taylor & Francis - Fostering human progress through knowledge: Special Edition – Transgender, 7(3), pp 269–272
