= Alice Dreger =

American bioethicist, historian, and author

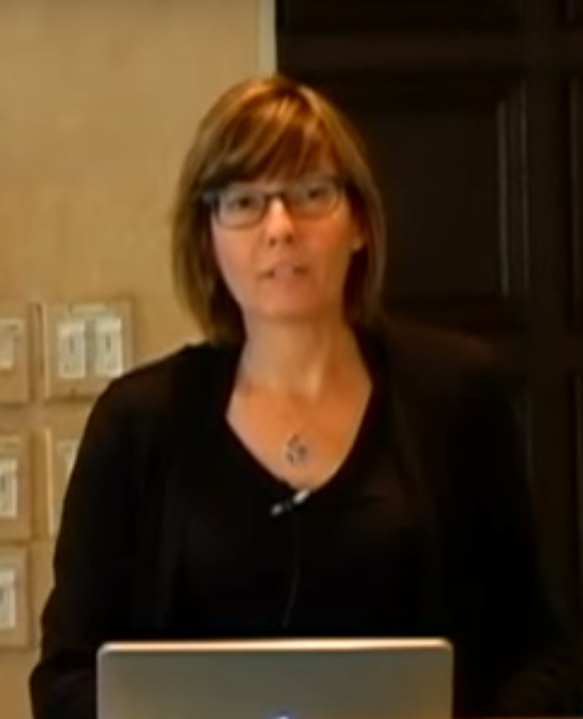
- Dreger in 2015
- Born: Alice Domurat Dreger; United States
- Education: State University of New York, Old Westbury (BA); Indiana University, Bloomington (MA, PhD)
- Known for: Conjoined twinning; intersex; disorders of sex development; social justice
- Awards: John Simon Guggenheim Memorial Foundation Fellowship
- Scientific career
- Fields: Bioethics, humanities
- Workplaces: Northwestern University, Michigan State University
- Website: alicedreger.com

Alice Domurat Dreger (/ˈdreɪɡər/) is an American historian, bioethicist, author, and former professor of clinical medical humanities and bioethics at the Feinberg School of Medicine, Northwestern University, in Chicago, Illinois.

Dreger engages in academic work and activism in support of individuals born with atypical sex characteristics (intersex or disorders of sex development) and individuals born as conjoined twins. She challenges the perception that those with physical differences are "broken" and need to be "fixed". She has opposed the use of "corrective" surgery on babies whose genitalia are considered "ambiguous". She has criticized the failure to follow such patients in later life and reported longer-term medical and psychological difficulties experienced by some of the people whose sex is arbitrarily assigned.

She supported J. Michael Bailey in the face of controversy over his 2003 book The Man Who Would Be Queen. In a 2008 article and in her 2015 book, Galileo's Middle Finger, Dreger argued that the controversy had gone beyond addressing the scientific theories presented in Bailey's book to become a personal attack upon Bailey.

Dreger has been a featured speaker at TED talks. She has also worked as a journalist, founding East Lansing Info, a website that covers local affairs in East Lansing, Michigan.

== Early life and education ==
Dreger was born to Polish Catholic immigrants. According to her blog, her mother had survived World War II as a child in a village under Nazi and Soviet occupations, enduring extreme poverty. Her mother's experiences played an important role in Dreger's upbringing, emphasising the importance of the freedoms in the US, particularly those granted by the First Amendment.

Dreger received her Ph.D. in history and philosophy of science from Indiana University Bloomington in 1995.

== Academic career ==
External media

Audio
- "Episode 205: Sex and Gender: What We Know and Don't Know", Science History Institute

Video
- "Is anatomy destiny", Alice Dreger, TED Talk
- "ISIR 2015 Holden Awards Address", Alice Dreger

Dreger has taught at both Michigan State University, where she received a Teacher-Scholar Award in 2000, and at Northwestern University (2005–2015).

During her doctoral work, she became interested in "how and why it is that scientists and medical doctors work to mediate the relationships between our bodies and our selves" and "why it is we often look to scientists and medical doctors to read or even alter our bodies". In 1995, she published a paper in Victorian Studies, examining 19th-century British medical attitudes toward intersex people. In 1998, she published the book Hermaphrodites and the Medical Invention of Sex and in 1999, Intersex in the age of ethics. Increasingly, she became engaged in intersex activism as well as scholarship, advocating that doctors accept a wide variety of genital structure rather than "correcting" babies' genitalia to conform to artificially gendered standards. More recently, she has criticized the prenatal use of dexamethasone to normalize female genitalia in cases of congenital adrenal hyperplasia and tried to charge that its safety has not been sufficiently tested by pediatrician Maria New.

In 2004, Dreger published One of Us: Conjoined Twins and the Future of Normal, an examination of conjoined twinning and of surgical practice. It raised similar issues to her earlier work on intersex people: questioning the ways in which the surgical profession defines "acceptable limits of the normal" and enforces conformity to such norms. She criticized the lack of long-range follow-up studies of separated children. She also introduced more than twenty sets of conjoined twins, most of whom adapted happily to the challenges of their situations.

In The Man Who Would Be Queen (2003), J. Michael Bailey defended Ray Blanchard's controversial transsexualism typology. In 2008, Dreger published an article in Archives of Sexual Behavior, describing in detail the opposition to Bailey and his work. A major concern for her was the ways in which she believed attacks targeted him as a person and a scholar, rather than addressing his ideas. Dreger asserted that a theory should be judged by its supporting evidence. She argued against reduction of the controversy to a simple dualism, seeing the ideas and actions of all those involved as "significantly more complicated". As a result of the paper, Dreger herself was perceived as attacking trans people and was drawn into an ongoing controversy.

In 2009, Dreger received a Guggenheim fellowship to study conflicts between activists and scientists. She has examined a number of conflicts, including the career of Napoleon Chagnon. Dreger accepts that scientists, being human, have biases and ideologies. But, she argues, they must "put the truth first and the quest for social justice second" and try to "adhere to an intellectual agenda that [isn't] first and only political".

Forms of scholarship that deny evidence, that deny truth, that deny the importance of facts, even when performed in the name of good, are dangerous, not only to science and to ethics but to democracy.

— Alice Dreger, 2008, quoted in 2015

== Galileo's Middle Finger ==
In 2015, Dreger published Galileo's Middle Finger, a book that covered her observations and experiences with controversies in academic medicine, especially those surrounding human sexuality. This included her work with intersex people, the career of Napoleon Chagnon, Dreger's criticisms of Maria New, and her defense of J. Michael Bailey and its consequences. The New York Times described Dreger's "smart, delightful book" as "many things: a rant, a manifesto, a treasury of evocative new terms (sissyphobia, autogynephilia, phall-o-meter) and an account of the author's transformation" from activist to anti-activist and back again.

While the book received positive reviews from the Chicago Tribune, the Chronicle of Higher Education, Salon, and activist and author Dan Savage, Galileo's Middle Finger also reignited controversy over her defense of Bailey and her discussion of transgender issues. The book was removed from consideration for a Lambda Literary Award after complaints. One critic accused Dreger of transphobia, saying that her book promoted the idea that trans women are "just self-hating homosexual men who believe they could have guilt-free sex if they were female and heterosexual men with an out-of-control fetish (autogynephilia)". Dreger protested the removal in an open letter to the Lambda Literary Foundation. Dreger herself has since reiterated her articulation of ideas in Galileo's Middle Finger that relate to trans women, stating that she considers both gender and sexuality to be relevant and valid concerns for people and therefore finds value in Blanchard's dual categorization, if not his terminology.

I want to emphasize that I think both of these developmental paths are perfectly legitimate ways to become women, and regardless of how someone becomes a woman, if she identifies as such, we owe her the respect of recognizing her identity and addressing her appropriately.

== Later career ==
Dreger resigned from Northwestern University in August 2015, citing concerns around censorship. The school had ordered her and other editors of Atrium, a bioethics journal, to take down an article written by a paralysis patient, William Peace, about his purported firsthand experiences of consensual oral sex with nurses in the 1970s. Although the article was eventually reposted, the university established its own editorial committee to approve future issues of the journal.

Dreger is the founder of East Lansing Info, a nonprofit local journalism web outlet covering the city of East Lansing, Michigan. From 2012 to the end of 2023, she worked as publisher, president, and reporter for the organization. In 2025, she took on the role of editor for the Medical Evidence Project, a venture of the Center for Scientific Integrity.

== Fiction writing ==
In June 2022, Dreger self-published her first novel, The Index Case, under the pseudonym Molly Macallen. She discussed its origins with Iona Italia on Areo Magazine's Two for Tea podcast. The sequel was self-published in 2023.

== Selected bibliography ==
=== Books ===
- Dreger, Alice Domurat (1998). Hermaphrodites and the medical invention of sex. Cambridge, Massachusetts: Harvard University Press. ISBN 9780674034334.
- Dreger, Alice Domurat (1999). Intersex in the age of ethics. Hagerstown, Maryland: University Publishing Group. ISBN 9781555721008.
- Dreger, Alice Domurat (2004). One of us: conjoined twins and the future of normal. Cambridge, Massachusetts: Harvard University Press. ISBN 9780674018259.
- Dreger, Alice Domurat (2015). Galileo's Middle Finger: heretics, activists, and the search for justice in science. New York: Penguin Press. ISBN 9781594206085.

=== Journal articles ===
- Dreger, Alice Domurat (May 1998). ""Ambiguous sex": or ambivalent medicine? Ethical issues in the treatment of intersexuality". Hastings Center Report. 28 (3): 24–35. doi:10.2307/3528648. JSTOR 3528648. PMID 9669179.
- Dreger, Alice Domurat (Winter 2000). "Jarring bodies: thoughts on the display of unusual anatomies". Perspectives in Biology and Medicine. 43 (2): 161–172. doi:10.1353/pbm.2000.0002. PMID 10804583. S2CID 34463546.
- Dreger, Alice Domurat (Spring 2004). "Special section: "The Visible Skeleton Series": the art of Laura Ferguson". Perspectives in Biology and Medicine. 47 (2): 159–175. doi:10.1353/pbm.2004.0023. PMID 15259200. S2CID 27547527.
- Dreger, Alice Domurat (January 2006). "How sex changed: a history of transsexuality in the United States (review)". Journal of the History of Sexuality. 15 (1): 148–151. doi:10.1353/sex.2006.0051. S2CID 142261877.
- Dreger, Alice Domurat; Vasey, Paul L. (Autumn 2007). "Sex, gender, and sexuality diversity: introduction". Perspectives in Biology and Medicine. 50 (4): 479–480. doi:10.1353/pbm.2007.0045. S2CID 57116711.
- Dreger, Alice Domurat (2008). "The Controversy Surrounding The Man Who Would Be Queen: A Case History of the Politics of Science, Identity, and Sex in the Internet Age". Archives of Sexual Behavior. 37 (3): 366–421. doi:10.1007/s10508-007-9301-1. PMC 3170124. PMID 18431641.
- Dreger, Alice Domurat; Herndon, April M. (2009). "Progress and politics in the intersex rights movement: feminist theory in action". GLQ: A Journal of Lesbian and Gay Studies. 15 (2): 199–224. doi:10.1215/10642684-2008-134. S2CID 145754009.
- Dreger, Alice; Feder, Ellen K.; Tamar-Mattis, Anne (September 2012). "Prenatal Dexamethasone for Congenital Adrenal Hyperplasia: An Ethics Canary in the Modern Medical Mine". Journal of Bioethical Inquiry. 9 (3): 277–294. doi:10.1007/s11673-012-9384-9. ISSN 1176-7529. PMC 3416978. PMID 22904609.
- Feder, Ellen K.; Dreger, Alice (May 2016). "Still ignoring human rights in intersex care". Journal of Pediatric Urology. 12 (6): 436–437. doi:10.1016/j.jpurol.2016.05.017. ISSN 1477-5131. PMID 27349148.
