= Seeing Calvin Coolidge in a Dream =

1996 novel by John Derbyshire

- Author: John Derbyshire
- Language: English
- Genre: Fiction
- Publisher: St. Martin's Press
- Publication date: 1996
- Publication place: United States
- Pages: 273
- ISBN: 0-312-14044-4

Seeing Calvin Coolidge in a Dream is a 1996 book by John Derbyshire. It was a New York Times "Notable Book of the Year".

== Plot ==
A Capraesque yarn of midlife crisis, romance and spirituality told by a Chinese immigrant banker residing in suburban New York, who nearly destroys his marriage and finds salvation in the words and deeds of President Calvin Coolidge.
