= Angela Clayton =

Transgender rights activists and physicist (1959 – 2014)

Angela Helen Clayton
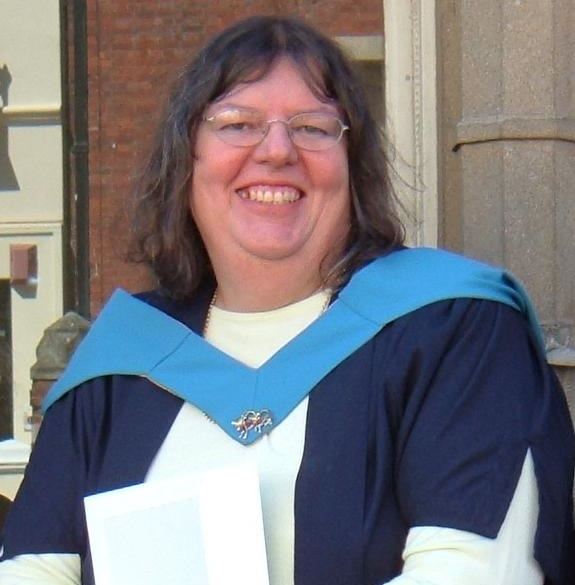
- Angela Clayton in 2009
- Born: 1959
- Died: 8 January 2014 (aged 54–55); Reading, Berkshire, England
- Occupation: Physicist

Angela Helen Clayton MBE (1959 – 8 January 2014) was an internationally known physicist working in the fields of Nuclear Criticality Safety and Health Physics. She was also a campaigner for the rights of transgender people.

== Professional career ==
Clayton served as the Head of Criticality Safety the Atomic Weapons Establishment (now AWE Nuclear Security Technologies) and was the Chairperson of the UK Working Party on Criticality. She was a member of the Working Group for American National Standard 8.15 - Nuclear Criticality Control of Special Actinide Elements coordinated by the American Nuclear Society, a participant in the International Criticality Safety Benchmark Evaluation Project, and a member of Advisory Programme Committees and Technical Programme Committees for several International Conferences on Nuclear Criticality Safety (e.g. International Conference on Nuclear Criticality Safety (ICNC) 1991 - UK, ICNC 2003 - Japan, ICNC 2007 - Russia).

She authored or co-authored several published papers on various aspects of criticality safety.

She held various roles in Safety Committees and the Reactor Safety Panel at AWE. She was interested in the subjects of criticality safety and Radiological Protection - Health Physics.

Clayton was also active in national and local Prospect trade union activities, including serving on the pension National Executive Committee (NEC) Advisory Sub Committee and was an elected trustee of the AWE Pension Scheme from 1 February 2009 - 1 February 2011.

After her early retirement in March 2011 on medical grounds due to complications from an old automobile accident in 1996, she pursued various artistic and intellectual activities including acquiring a large telescope with which she could engage in a lifelong love of astronomy.

Her most recent degree was in Law from the Open University. She graduated with a first in April 2009.

== Activism ==
Her early interactions with medical practitioners were described as traumatic, leading her to transition without medical support. After living several years as a woman, she reengaged with medical practitioners to obtain surgery.

She worked as a campaigner with Press for Change beginning in 1999 and later served as their vice-president. Her interest in the role of trade unions in promoting equality for trans people led her to become the first “trans observer” to the UK Trades Union Congress (TUC) LGBT Committee. She was also involved in the development and implementation of the Gender Recognition Act 2004.

She was appointed a Member of the Order of the British Empire (MBE) in June 2005 "for services to gender issues". Clayton was a speaker at the Greater London LGBT Organising Day in February 2008. She contributed to the "Trans Data Position Paper" for the National Statistics: UK Statistics Authority in 2009. She was a coauthor on a paper published in Sexual and Relationship Theory titled "Good Practice Guidelines for the Assessment and Treatment of Adults with Gender Dysphoria."

Clayton died on 8 January 2014 of pancreatitis.
