= Perspectives in Biology and Medicine =

- Discipline: Medicine, biology, philosophy of science
- Language: English
- Edited by: Martha Montello, University of Kansas Medical Center

Publication details
- History: 1957-present
- Publisher: Johns Hopkins University Press (United States)
- Frequency: Quarterly
- Impact factor: 0.377 (2016)

Standard abbreviations
- ISO 4: Perspect. Biol. Med.

Indexing
- ISSN: 0031-5982 (print); 1529-8795 (web)
- OCLC no.: 1762134

Links
- Journal homepage

Perspectives in Biology and Medicine is a peer-reviewed academic journal established in 1957. It publishes essays that explore biology and medicine in relation to their place in society. Authors write informally, presenting their "perspectives" as the title suggests. Topics covered are sometimes explicitly scientific, but might also extend into areas of philosophy, history, pedagogy, and medical practice. The journal is published quarterly by the Johns Hopkins University Press.

== See also ==
- Medical humanities
