= Prime Obsession =

Book by John Derbyshire

- Prime Obsession: Bernhard Riemann and the Greatest Unsolved Problem in Mathematics by John Derbyshire
- Author: John Derbyshire
- Language: English
- Subject: Mathematics, History of science
- Genre: Popular science
- Publisher: Joseph Henry Press
- Publication date: 2003
- Publication place: United States
- Pages: 448
- ISBN: 0-309-08549-7

Prime Obsession: Bernhard Riemann and the Greatest Unsolved Problem in Mathematics (2003) is a historical book on mathematics by John Derbyshire, detailing the history of the Riemann hypothesis, named for Bernhard Riemann, and some of its applications.

The book was awarded the Mathematical Association of America's inaugural Euler Book Prize in 2007.

== Overview ==
The book is written such that even-numbered chapters present historical elements related to the development of the conjecture, and odd-numbered chapters deal with the mathematical and technical aspects. Despite the title, the book provides biographical information on many iconic mathematicians including Euler, Gauss, and Lagrange.

In chapter 1, "Card Trick", Derbyshire introduces the idea of an infinite series and the ideas of convergence and divergence of these series. He imagines that there is a deck of cards stacked neatly together, and that one pulls off the top card so that it overhangs from the deck. Explaining that it can overhang only as far as the center of gravity allows, the card is pulled so that exactly half of it is overhanging. Then, without moving the top card, he slides the second card so that it is overhanging too at equilibrium. As he does this more and more, the fractional amount of overhanging cards as they accumulate becomes less and less. He explores various types of series such as the harmonic series.

In chapter 2, Bernhard Riemann is introduced and a brief historical account of Germany in the 18th Century is discussed.

In chapter 3, the Prime Number Theorem (PNT) is introduced. The function which mathematicians use to describe the number of primes in N numbers, π(N), is shown to behave in a logarithmic manner, as so:

$$\pi(N) \approx \frac{N}{\log(N)}$$

where log is the natural logarithm.

In chapter 4, Derbyshire gives a short biographical history of Carl Friedrich Gauss and Leonard Euler, setting up their involvement in the Prime Number Theorem.

In chapter 5, the Riemann Zeta Function is introduced:

$$\zeta(s) = 1 + \frac{1}{2^s} + \frac{1}{3^s} + \frac{1}{4^s} + \cdots = \sum_{n = 1}^\infty \frac{1}{n^s}$$

In chapter 7, the sieve of Eratosthenes is shown to be able to be simulated using the Zeta function. With this, the following statement which becomes the pillar stone of the book is asserted:

$$\zeta(s) = \prod_{p\ \mathrm{prime}} \frac{1}{1 - {p^{-s}}}$$

Following the derivation of this finding, the book delves into how this is manipulated to expose the PNT's nature.

== Audience and reception ==
According to reviewer S. W. Graham, the book is written at a level that is suitable for advanced undergraduate students of mathematics. In contrast, James V. Rauff recommends it to "anyone interested in the history and mathematics of the Riemann hypothesis".

Reviewer Don Redmond writes that, while the even-numbered chapters explain the history well, the odd-numbered chapters present the mathematics too informally to be useful, failing to provide insight to readers who do not already understand the mathematics, and failing even to explain the importance of the Riemann hypothesis. Graham adds that the level of mathematics is inconsistent, with detailed explanations of basics and sketchier explanations of material that is more advanced. But for those who do already understand the mathematics, he calls the book "a familiar story entertainingly told".
