= Ramesh Ponnuru =

American political pundit and journalist (born 1974)

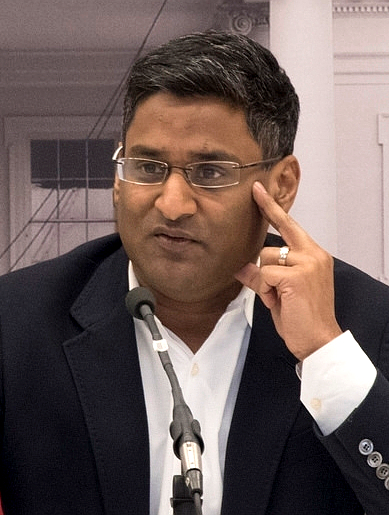
- Ponnuru in 2016
- Born: August 16, 1974 (age 52); Prairie Village, Kansas, U.S.
- Education: Princeton University (BA)
- Occupations: Columnist, editor
- Notable credit: The Party of Death (2006)
- Political party: Republican
- Spouse: April Ponnuru

Ramesh Ponnuru (/rəˈmɛʃ pəˈnʊəruː/; born August 16, 1974) is an American political pundit and journalist. He is the editor of National Review magazine, a contributing columnist for The Washington Post, and a contributing editor to the domestic policy journal National Affairs. He has been a senior fellow at the American Enterprise Institute since 2012.

In 2015, Politico Magazine listed both him and his wife, April Ponnuru, as two of the top "Politico 50" influential leaders in American politics. This was the first and only time that a husband and wife appeared on the list at the same time.

== Early life and education ==
Ponnuru was born on August 16, 1974, and he was raised in Prairie Village, Kansas, a suburb of Kansas City, Missouri, where he attended Briarwood Elementary School and Mission Valley Middle School. After graduating from Shawnee Mission East High School, at the age of 16, he attended Princeton University, where he earned a B.A. in history and graduated summa cum laude in 1995. He completed a 107-page long senior thesis, titled "Abortion in Nineteenth-Century America, in Brief", under the supervision of Robert P. George. Raised by a Hindu father and a Lutheran mother, Ponnuru is of Indian descent. Later in life, Ponnuru, once an agnostic, converted to Catholicism. He is married to April Ponnuru.

== Career ==
=== Political pundit ===
Since 1999, Ponnuru has been either a senior fellow or senior editor at National Review, where he has written and commented about politics, public policy, economics, the law, and religion.

Ponnuru advocated for increasing the child tax credit to properly compensate parents for the cost of raising children. He was formerly a co-author with economist David Beckworth on monetary policy and market monetarism.

Ponnuru has frequently appeared on a diverse array of television programs about public affairs, among them Meet the Press, Face the Nation, various C-SPAN programs, the PBS NewsHour, National Public Radio's All Things Considered, ABC News' This Week with George Stephanopoulos, ABC News. The Daily Show, and The Colbert Report.

He has also been a guest speaker on policy, politics, and constitutionalism at some leading college campuses in the United States, In 2013, he was a fellow at the University of Chicago's Institute of Politics.

In 2006, Ponnuru wrote The Party of Death: The Democrats, the Media, the Courts, and the Disregard for Human Life. In the book, Ponnuru discusses right-to-life issues as abortion and euthanasia and argues that the United States Democratic Party shifted from anti-abortion to pro-abortion rights over time.

The National Review Online Editor at Large Jonah Goldberg, praised the book and wrote: "Ponnuru scrupulously sticks to nonreligious arguments, accessible to everyone. But that hasn't stopped critics from charging that his motives are unacceptably 'religious,' while others have complained Ponnuru is too coldly rational. Again it seems Ponnuru's real sin isn't how he says things, but that he says them at all."

Ponnuru also authored a book about Japanese industrial policy, published jointly by the American Enterprise Institute and Center for Policy Studies.

Ponnuru is a past contributor to Time and WashingtonPost.com. He has also written for The New York Times, The Washington Post, The Wall Street Journal, Financial Times, Newsday, New York Post, The Weekly Standard, Policy Review, The New Republic, and First Things, an ecumenical and conservative religious journal.

Ponnuru has spoken on conservative domestic policy and their political implications; he has regularly been a featured guest at expensive retreats for congressional Republicans.

=== Reform conservative ===
Ponnuru has been identified as a leader of the "reform conservative" movement, and was prominently featured in a 2014 New York Times Magazine cover story as one of the foremost conservative intellectuals who comprise it. The Times' Sam Tanenhaus described Ponnuru as one of a small group of young conservative Republicans, who, each one, "was an intellectual prodigy in his 30s" who together had "become the leaders of a small band of reform conservatives, sometimes called reformicons, who believe the health of the G.O.P. hinges on jettisoning its age-old doctrine — orgiastic tax-cutting, the slashing of government programs, the championing of Wall Street — and using an altogether different vocabulary, backed by specific proposals, that will reconnect the party to middle-class and low-income voters."

In 2014, Ponnuru co-edited, with Yuval Levin, Room to Grow: Conservative Reforms for a Limited Government and a Thriving Middle Class, described as a reform conservative manifesto and policy agenda. Ponnuru also contributed the book's concluding chapter, on constitutionalism. The book received positive reviews; New York Times columnist David Brooks described it as a "policy-laden manifesto... which is the most coherent and compelling policy agenda the American right has produced this century."

== Books ==
- Ponnuru, Ramesh (2006). The Party of Death: The Democrats, the Media, the Courts, and the Disregard for Human Life. Regnery Publishing. ISBN 9781596980044. Description and contents, using up/down arrows.
