= Della Aleksander =

Transgender rights activist and fascist

Della Joan S. Aleksander (1923–2001) was a British teacher and campaigner for trans rights. She was a co-producer of an episode of the current affairs talk programme Open Door, which was the first to feature trans women. She was a member of fascist organisations, such as the League of St George.

== Biography ==
Aleksander was born in 1923, she went to Casablanca for gender alignment surgery in 1970. She described how it was not until she took hormone therapy that she felt herself to be transsexual. In 1971, she established Gender Research Association International Liaison (GRAIL).

Moonshadow 1973, 12: p. 5 reports on Open Door and Aleksander

Aleksander launched a magazine entitled Two for One, which addressed trans issues. She was a member of the Transsexual Liberation Group (TLG). In 1973, she co-produced and co-presented an episode of the current affairs programme Open Door, which gave four trans women from the TLG a platform to discuss National Health Service (NHS) care and societal attitudes to trans issues. The programme was first broadcast on 2 June 1973. The other women on the programme were Rachel Bowen, Jan Ford and Laura Palet. Aleksander wrote a comment piece for Gay News after the programme, myth-busting some trans issues. In 1974, she spoke at The First National TV TS Conference held at the University of Leeds.

Aleksander was associated with far-right politics. In 1995, Searchlight described her as "one of postwar Britain's best-known Mosleyites". She was a pupil of Roger Scruton's at Birkbeck College and was a member of the League of St George. As a member of the league, she met with white supremacist David Duke in 1978 in Belgium, along with other British fascists. She died in 2001 at around 77-78.
