= National Academies Press =

Organization in Washington D.C., United States

- Parent company: National Academies of Sciences, Engineering, and Medicine
- Headquarters location: Washington, D.C.
- Distribution: Self-distributed (US); Gardners (UK-EU); World Scientific (Asia); Maruzen, Kinokuniya (Japan)
- Publication types: Proceedings, Consensus Study Reports, Rapid Expert Consultations, and supporting materials available in multiple online formats and as books
- Imprints: Joseph Henry Press Transportation Research Board
- Official website: nap.nationalacademies.org

The US National Academies Press (NAP) was created to publish the reports issued by the National Academies of Sciences, Engineering, and Medicine (formerly known as the National Research Council), the National Academy of Sciences, National Academy of Engineering, and the National Academy of Medicine. It publishes nearly 500 titles a year on a wide range of topics in the sciences, engineering, medicine, and transportation. The NAP's stated mission is to disseminate as widely as possible the works of the National Academies of Sciences, Engineering, and Medicine, and to be financially self-sustaining through sales. This mission has led to great experimentation in openness regarding online publishing and open access.

The National Academy Press, as it was known in 1993, was the first self-sustaining publisher to make its material available on the Web, for free, in an open access model. By 1997, 1000 reports were available as sequential page images (starting with i, then ii, then iii, then iv...), with a minimal navigational envelope. Their experience up to 1998 was already indicating that open access led to increased sales, at least with page images as the final viewable object.

From 1998, the NAP developed the "Openbook", an online navigational envelope, producing stable page URLs, and enabling chapter-, page-, and in-book search navigation to images of the book pages, which were increasingly replaced by HTML chunks to enable the user to browse the book. This page-by-page navigation was produced long before Amazon's Look Inside, or Google's Book Search.

The NAP gradually evolved the Openbook to first enable better external findability (making the HTML page for the first page image of every chapter include the first 10 and last 10 pages of OCRed ASCII text of the chapter, to produce a robustly indexable first chapter page), as well as exploring the boundaries of knowledge discovery and exploration, implementing "Related Titles" in 2001, the "Find More Like This Chapter" in 2002, "Chapter Skim" in 2003, "Search Builder" and "Reference Finder" in 2004, and "Active Skim" and enhanced "Search Builder" in 2005.

== Online pricing experiment ==
In 2003, the NAP published the results of an online experiment to determine the "cannibalization effect" that might occur if the NAP gave all reports away online in PDF format.

Developed as a Mellon-funded grant, and working with the University of Maryland Business School, the experiment interrupted buyers just before finalizing an online order, with an opportunity to acquire the work in PDF for a randomly generated discount: 50%, 10%, 100%, 70% off the list price, and if the answer was "no", the NAP would offer one more step off the price.

The conclusion was that 42% of customers, when interrupted when buying a print book online, would take the free PDF of the book, meaning that 58% of the potential purchasers were willing to pay to have a printed book. Significant implications to publishing strategies are produced by these numbers, especially in the context of NAP's "long tail" experience when it gave away free access to PDFs (about 50% of the list) to low-sales content, which resulted in only 33% loss of sales, over 18 months (while enabling 100 times the dissemination).

Through mid-2006, as reported at the AAUP annual meeting, the NAP remained financially self-sustaining as a publisher, even while progressively expanding the utility of the online experience, and increasing its online traffic and dissemination.

Multiple articles and presentations by Barbara Kline Pope, executive director of the NAP, and by Michael Jon Jensen, director of publishing technologies for the NAP from 1998 through 2008, provide background on the evolving business strategies for "free in an environment of content abundance" that the National Academies Press continues to pursue.

== Use of National Academies consensus reports by the American public ==
A 2022 study published in Proceedings of the National Academy of Sciences analyzed 1.6 million downloads of National Academies reports using machine-learning techniques to classify how the public uses them.

The study found that roughly half of usage was for academic purposes (such as research and teaching), while the other half involved non-academic uses, including improving professional practice, informing personal decisions, and general learning.

The findings provide evidence of substantial public demand for high-quality, open-access scientific information and suggest that such reports are widely used beyond traditional expert audiences.

== Free PDFs ==
On June 2, 2011, the NAP announced that it would provide the full text of all of the reports of the National Academies of Sciences, Engineering, and Medicine as free PDF downloads.

A 2011 analysis described the National Academies Press's decision to make its PDFs freely available as the result of more than a decade of experimentation with digital publishing and pricing models. Beginning in the 1990s, the press tested free online access and variable pricing, including offering free PDFs in developing countries and studying how free digital versions affected print sales. Internal research suggested that making PDFs free would reduce some revenue, but this could be offset through cost-cutting measures such as shifting marketing online, outsourcing printing and distribution, and discontinuing unprofitable products. The move was ultimately justified as a way to significantly expand dissemination of its publications while maintaining financial sustainability.

By early of 2025, 25 million PDFs had been downloaded.

By April 2026, 15,485 books were freely available online and/or for download.

== See also ==
- List of English-language book publishing companies
- List of university presses
