= Press for Change =

UK transgender rights group

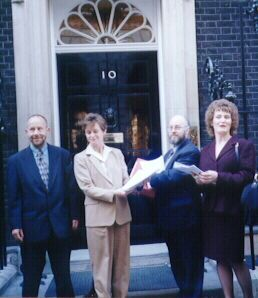
Press for Change at 10 Downing Street in 1997

Press for Change (PFC) is a UK-based campaign group focusing on the rights and treatment of trans people. Its stated aim is "seeking respect and equality for all trans people in the UK". The group led the campaign for full legal recognition for transgender people living in Britain including the right to marry. The organisation began on 27 February 1992 and its founders included Mark Rees and Stephen Whittle.

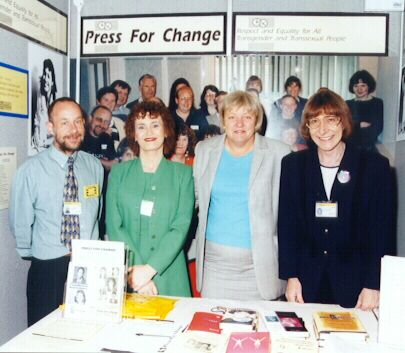
Press for Change with Mo Mowlam – 1 October 1997

== Notable figures in the group ==
- Christine Burns MBE, former vice president.
- Angela Clayton MBE, former vice president.
- Claire McNab MBE, former vice president.
- Mark Rees, co founder of the group (deceased).
- Professor Stephen Whittle, OBE, PhD vice president and co founder of the group.

Burns and Whittle were given their honours, "for services to gender issues", in relation to their work for Press for Change.

== Patrons ==
- Julie Hesmondhalgh, the actress who plays Hayley Cropper in Coronation Street, the first transgender character in a British soap opera.
- Baron Beaumont of Whitley, Anglican priest, life peer, first member of either the House of Lords or House of Commons to sit as a member of the Green Party.

== See also ==
- Transgender rights in the United Kingdom
