= J. Michael Bailey =

American psychologist (born 1957)

Michael Bailey
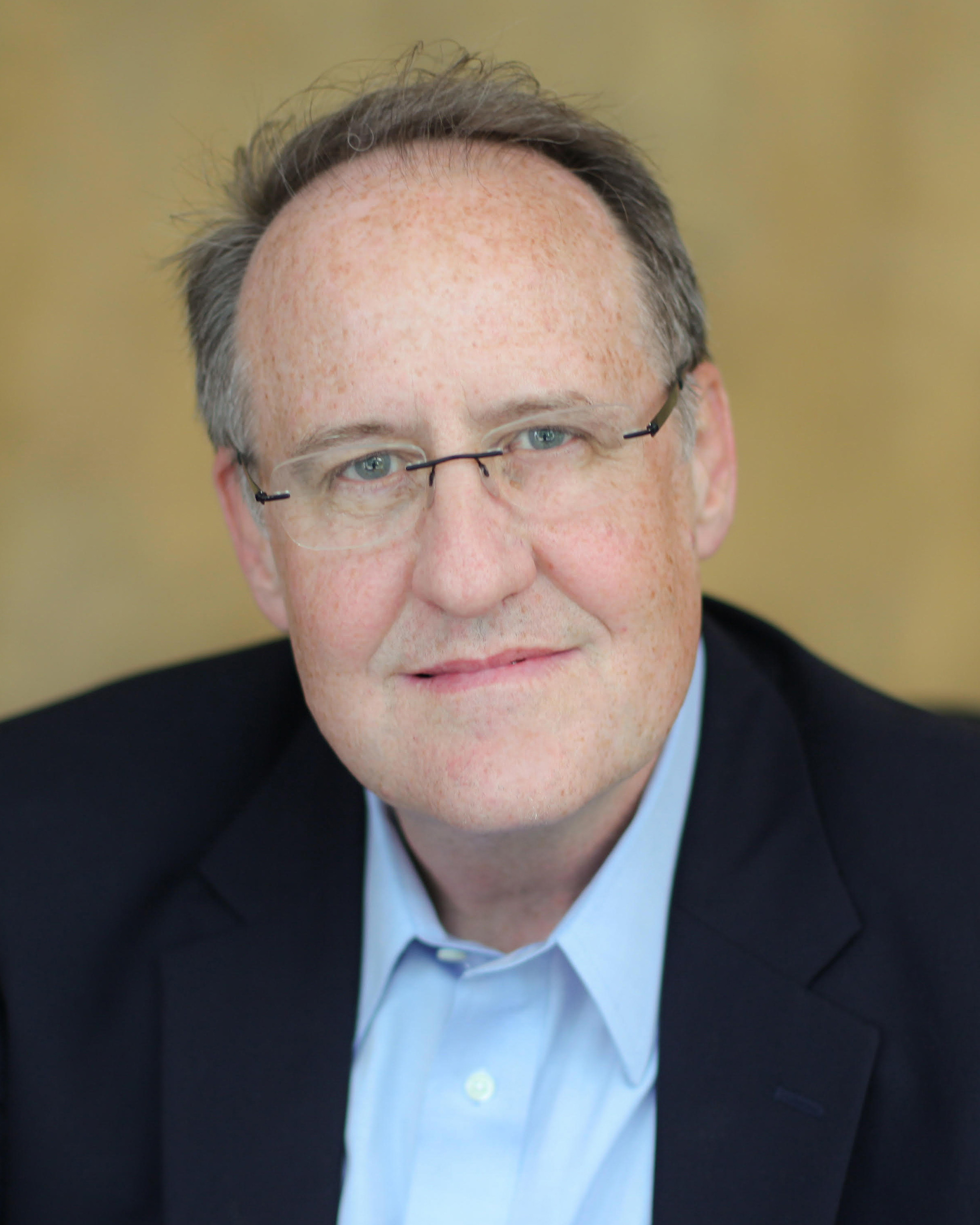
- Bailey in 2014
- Born: John Michael Bailey; July 2, 1957 (age 69); Lubbock, Texas, U.S.
- Education: Washington University (BA); University of Texas, Austin (PhD)
- Known for: Sexual orientation research, behavior genetics
- Children: 2
- Scientific career
- Fields: Psychology, behavior genetics
- Workplaces: Northwestern University

John Michael Bailey (born July 2, 1957) is an American psychologist, behavioral geneticist, and professor at Northwestern University best known for his work on the etiology of sexual orientation and paraphilia. He maintains that male sexual orientation is most likely established through biological influences.

Bailey wrote The Man Who Would Be Queen, a book about male sexual orientation and Blanchard's typology of transgender women, which generated significant controversy.

== Education and career ==
Bailey was born in Lubbock, Texas. He obtained his Bachelor of Arts degree in mathematics from Washington University in St. Louis in 1979 and his Ph.D. in clinical psychology from the University of Texas at Austin in 1989, where he studied under behavioral genetics researcher Lee Willerman.

Bailey became a professor at Northwestern University in 1989. In the 1990s, Bailey published several papers that suggested a heritable component for sexual orientation. In 2003 he published The Man Who Would Be Queen.

In October 2004, Bailey stepped down as chairman of the Psychology Department, but continued to serve as a Northwestern professor.

In 2018, Bailey invited controversial evolutionary psychologist Satoshi Kanazawa to Northwestern University as a visiting scholar. Many at the university protested, and more than 4,000 signed a petition in opposition to Kanazawa doing research there due to Kanazawa's claims regarding sexuality, race, religion, and feminism.

In December 2003, the Southern Poverty Law Center (SPLC) reported that J. Michael Bailey and Ray Blanchard were associated with far-right blogger Steve Sailer's Human Biodiversity Institute. In October 2018, the SPLC reported that Bailey and Blanchard had written an article for 4thWaveNow, which the SPLC characterizes as an anti-trans website in support of the controversial concept of "rapid-onset gender dysphoria".

== Research and views ==
Bailey's dissertation research tested Günter Dörner's hypothesis that prenatal stress may cause homosexuality in male offspring, for which he failed to find evidence. In later research he also examined the phenomenon known as gaydar with Gerulf Rieger.

Bailey carried out early twin studies on homosexuality, finding higher rates of concordance for sexual orientation in identical twins than fraternal twins, suggesting genes or shared prenatal environment have influence on sexual orientation.

Bailey has argued that male sexual orientation appears unaffected by socialization. Bailey has written about cases of typical boys, including David Reimer, who were surgically reassigned and raised as girls from infancy, yet grew up to be attracted to females. In a 2016 review, Bailey reported on seven total cases of boys who were reared as girls, and all were strongly attracted to females. Bailey et al. describe this as a "near perfect quasi experiment" testing nature versus nurture on male sexual orientation.

Much of Bailey's research has examined sexual arousal patterns and their relation to sexual orientation in men and women. This research has focused on both genital and self-reported sexual arousal measures. For example, Bailey's lab showed that men's genital sexual arousal patterns closely tracked their sexual orientations, but women's did not.

In 2005, an arousal study by Bailey's lab found in a sample of bisexual identified males, "Men who reported bisexual feelings did not show any evidence of a distinctively bisexual pattern of genital arousal". The study was met with critique by the National LGBTQ Task Force and FAIR for its methodology and sampling. Bailey told The New York Times, "I'm not denying that bisexual behavior exists, but I am saying that in men there's no hint that true bisexual arousal exists, and that for men arousal is orientation". Bailey was later approached by John Sylla from the American Institute of Bisexuality, who provided funding for a 2011 study, which filtered participants more stringently, requiring at least two sexual partners of each sex and at least one romantic relationship lasting three months or longer; this study found both genital and subjective arousal. In 2020, a research team including Bailey combined a much larger data set of around 500 men, and concluded that male sexuality exists along a continuum from heterosexuality, to bisexuality, to homosexuality, after finding genital arousal measurements generally matched self-identification with bisexuality.

In 2023, Springer retracted a paper co-authored by Bailey on the rapid onset gender dysphoria (ROGD) hypothesis "due to concerns about lack of informed consent", which had been published in the Archives of Sexual Behavior. The paper described ROGD as a controversial theory that "common cultural beliefs, values, and preoccupations cause some adolescents (especially female adolescents) to attribute their social problems, feelings, and mental health issues to gender dysphoria," and that "youth with ROGD falsely believe that they are transgender". The retraction followed an open letter signed by a number of researchers and LGBTQ organizations criticizing the journal's publication of the paper, stating that Bailey's paper did not have institutional review board (IRB) approval, and requested the journal's editor Kenneth Zucker be replaced. Critics also argued that the paper disregarded countervailing evidence and was based upon an unrepresentative sample of participants.

In 2024, Bailey served as witness in a legal challenge to Missouri's ban on gender affirming care for minors. He was questioned on his methodology in rapid onset dysphoria research.

== The Man Who Would Be Queen ==
Bailey's book The Man Who Would Be Queen: The Science of Gender Bending and Transsexualism was published in 2003. In it, Bailey reviewed evidence that male homosexuality is innate, a result of heredity and prenatal environment. He also reviewed the theory of Ray Blanchard that there are two unrelated forms of transsexualism, one that is an extreme type of homosexuality and one that is an expression of a paraphilia known as autogynephilia. Written in a popular science style, the book summarized research supporting Bailey's opinions.

The book generated considerable controversy. A paper on the controversy was written by Alice Dreger, a bioethicist and historian, known for her support of intersex rights. Dreger included additional details in Galileo's Middle Finger, an analysis of modern clashes between scientists and activists whose beliefs are challenged by them. In her documented account of the Bailey case, she concluded that a small group of self-styled activists tried to bury a politically challenging scientific theory by attacking Bailey: "These critics, rather than restrict themselves to the argument over the ideas, had charged Bailey with a whole host of serious crimes," but that "what they claimed about Bailey simply wasn't true."

A transgender woman whom he described in the book filed a complaint with Northwestern University alleging that her many discussions with Bailey about his view of trans women and the book he was writing made her a non-consensual subject of IRB-regulated research by Bailey, and that during this time, she had consensual sex with him. Northwestern found no basis for the complaint. Transgender professors Lynn Conway and Deirdre McCloskey filed a complaint against Bailey with Illinois state regulators, alleging that he practiced psychology without a license by providing brief case evaluation letters suggesting candidacy for sex reassignment surgery; however, the department did not pursue those allegations, as he did not accept remuneration for the services and therefore did not violate the law. Conway compared his work to Nazi propaganda. Writer and activist Andrea James posted pictures of his children (taken when they were in middle and elementary school) on her website with sexually explicit captions that were taken as direct quotations from his book, apparently as a critique of Bailey's descriptions of transsexual children in his book.

At least two women who said they were subjects in his book filed a complaint with Northwestern alleging that Bailey committed scientific misconduct by not informing them that they were to be the subjects of research used in the writing of his book. Northwestern did investigate this allegation. Although the findings of that investigation were not released, Northwestern's vice president for Research, C. Bradley Moore, said, "The allegations of scientific misconduct made against Professor J. Michael Bailey do not fall under the federal definition of scientific misconduct." and that the university "has established a protocol to help ensure that Professor Bailey's research activities involving human subjects are conducted in accordance with the expectations of the University, the regulations and guidelines established by the federal government and with generally accepted research standards." Bailey says that he did nothing wrong and that the attacks on him were motivated by the desire to suppress discussion of the book's ideas about transsexualism, especially autogynephilia. Alice Dreger, a bioethicist, published an account of the controversy in the Archives of Sexual Behavior. According to Dreger, the allegations of misconduct could accurately be described as "harassment", and an "anti-Bailey campaign". Dreger wrote that of the four women who complained to Northwestern, two acknowledged that they were aware they would be included in Bailey's book in their letter to the university. The other two were not described in the book. Dreger also reported that while there was no definitive evidence to refute the allegation of sexual misconduct, datestamps on e-mails between Bailey and his ex-wife indicated that he was at her home looking after their two children at the time the misconduct was said to have occurred. The journal published in the same issue 23 commentaries regarding multiple aspects of the controversy, including criticism of Dreger's analysis.

Outside of the transgender community and sexology researchers, this controversy is largely notable because of its implications for academic freedom and freedom of speech. In an interview with The New York Times, Dreger said, "If we're going to have research at all, then we're going to have people saying unpopular things, and if this is what happens to them, then we've got problems not only for science but free expression itself." Other critics believe that their actions against Bailey and his book represent legitimate comment on a topic of public interest.

== Appearances in news media ==
=== Features on homosexuality ===
Bailey and his work were featured prominently in a Boston Globe story by Neil Swidey entitled "What Makes People Gay?" That story was included in the 2006 volume of "The Best American Science Writing."

Bailey and his lab were also prominent in the CBS News 60 Minutes story "Gay or Straight?," which first aired on March 12, 2006 and was the most popular news story on the CBS News website the following week. Author David Ehrenstein, writing for The Advocate, said the show was "replete with the sort of clichés about gay men and effeminacy that haven't been seen in a network news context since the 1967 CBS broadcast The Homosexuals." The producer of the "Gay or Straight" segment responded with a defense of the segment and of Bailey's work.

=== "Fucksaw" incident ===
In 2011, Bailey's human sexuality class at Northwestern made the headlines of major news organizations after he allowed a female guest speaker and her male partner to perform a live mechanized sex toy demonstration using a "fucksaw"—a modified reciprocating saw converted into a sex toy by attaching a "phallic object" instead of a blade—to bring the woman to orgasm in front of the audience. Students were advised beforehand of the nature of the demonstration in this optional after-class event on kinky sex and female orgasm.

After the demonstration, Northwestern University President Morton Schapiro criticized Bailey for "extremely poor judgment" and launched an investigation. Bailey at first defended the demonstration, saying that students found lectures featuring guest speakers valuable, but subsequently issued an apology, saying he regretted the upset caused and its effect on the university's reputation. He said there would be no repeats, but maintained that the demonstration had been relevant to the topic of his course, and said that the students who chose to attend were over 18, "legally capable of voting, enlisting in the military, and consuming pornography", and contended that the criticism he had received was poorly reasoned.

The response among academics was mixed. Joseph Epstein criticized Bailey's class as failing academic standards in a long piece for The Weekly Standard, and compared Bailey to a pimp. Laurie Essig, writing in The Chronicle of Higher Education, thought that the incident "triggered a national conversation about what we can and cannot look at". In a web-only feature for Esquire, Bailey's former research assistant Paul Schrodt defended his teaching and research methods. Alice Dreger also defended Bailey's class as being of high quality in general, but agreed with Schapiro that the demonstration "was a case of poor judgment, because it wasn't worth it".

In response to the incident, Northwestern administrators removed Bailey's human sexuality course from the following year's curriculum. A year later, Northwestern reintroduced a somewhat differently themed sexuality class taught by Lane Fenrich.

== Selected bibliography ==
- Bailey JM, Vasey PL, Diamond LM, Breedlove SM, Vilain E, Epprecht M (2016). "Sexual Orientation, Controversy, and Science". Psychological Science in the Public Interest. 17 (2): 45–101. doi:10.1177/1529100616637616. PMID 27113562.
- Bailey JM (2003). The Man Who Would Be Queen: The Science of Gender-Bending and Transsexualism. Washington, D.C.: Joseph Henry Press. ISBN 978-0-309-08418-5.
- Bailey JM, Pillard RC, Dawood K, et al. (1999). "A family history study of male sexual orientation using three independent samples". Behavior Genetics. 29 (2): 79–86. doi:10.1023/A:1021652204405. PMID 10405456. S2CID 10953775.Bailey JM (1999). "Homosexuality and mental illness". Archives of General Psychiatry. 56 (10): 883–4. doi:10.1001/archpsyc.56.10.883. PMID 10530627.
- Dunne MP, Martin NG, Bailey JM, et al. (1997). "Participation bias in a sexuality survey: psychological and behavioural characteristics of responders and non-responders". International Journal of Epidemiology. 26 (4): 844–54. doi:10.1093/ije/26.4.844. PMID 9279618.
- Bailey JM (1995). "Sexual orientation revolution". Nature Genetics. 11 (4): 353–4. doi:10.1038/ng1295-353. PMID 7493006. S2CID 1086344.
- Bailey JM, Nothnagel J, Wolfe M (1995). "Retrospectively measured individual differences in childhood sex-typed behavior among gay men: Correspondence between self- and maternal reports". Archives of Sexual Behavior. 24 (6): 613–22. doi:10.1007/BF01542183. PMID 8572910. S2CID 10830453.
- Bailey JM, Zucker KJ (1995). "Childhood sex-typed behavior and sexual orientation: A conceptual analysis and quantitative review". Developmental Psychology. 31: 43–55. doi:10.1037/0012-1649.31.1.43. S2CID 28174284.
- Greenberg AS, Bailey JM (1993). "Do biological explanations of homosexuality have moral, legal, or policy implications?". Journal of Sex Research. 30 (3): 245–251. doi:10.1080/00224499309551708.
- Bailey JM, Miller JS, Willerman L (1993). "Maternally rated childhood gender nonconformity in homosexuals and heterosexuals". Archives of Sexual Behavior. 22 (5): 461–9. doi:10.1007/BF01542559. PMID 8239975. S2CID 23460867.
