= The Hidden Case of Ewan Forbes =

2021 nonfiction book by Zoë Playdon

The Hidden Case of Ewan Forbes: And the Unwritten History of the Trans Experience
- Cover art of American release
- Author: Zoë Playdon
- Language: English
- Publisher: Scribner, Bloomsbury Publishing
- Publication date: 2 November 2021; 11 November 2021
- Media type: Print / Digital
- Pages: 384
- ISBN: 978-1-982139-46-9
- Website: https://www.zoeplaydon.com/books/the-hidden-case-of-ewan-forbes

The Hidden Case of Ewan Forbes: And the Unwritten History of the Trans Experience is a nonfiction historical book written by Zoë Playdon and published by Scribner on 2 November 2021. A UK version of the book with the alternative subtitle The Transgender Trial that Threatened to Upend the British Establishment was published by Bloomsbury Publishing on 11 November 2021. The book discusses Sir Ewan Forbes, 11th Baronet, and the 1968 Scottish legal case over his being transgender and the inheritance of his baronetcy. The impacts of his case, how the results were suppressed by the government due to the potential impact on inheritance across the country, and the subsequent English case involving a trans individual, Corbett v Corbett, that had a direct forced ignorance of the evidence are main focuses of the book.

The rights were bought by production company Brazen Productions, who partnered with Synchronicity Films in 2021 to create a mini-series written by Sukey Fisher. The book was named as one of the 2022 Israel Fishman Non-Fiction Award Honor Books as a part of the annual Stonewall Book Awards presented by the American Library Association. The book was also nominated for the 34th annual Triangle Awards in the transgender category.

== Background and production ==
After Playdon co-founded the Parliamentary Forum on Gender Identity in 1994, her ongoing human rights work included assisting in a legal case in 1996 regarding trans rights. The issue of primogeniture was a primary component and issue in the case and a lawyer working alongside her on the case pointed out that until that subject was laid out clearly in the courts, such cases involving trans rights and inheritance would continue, prompting her to begin looking into past legal decisions. She had been aware that it was once common for trans individuals to transition and have their birth certificate changed to allow for inheritance, but that ended abruptly in 1970. It was through this investigation that Playdon became aware of Ewan Forbes and his legal history and subsequent cases that altered British law significantly for the trans community.

Playdon found multiple difficulties in uncovering information regarding the Forbes trial, as details had been covered up by the Scottish government for five decades. A request to the Home Office in 1996 went unanswered and employing the help of a member of Parliament only had them receive two answers from the Lord Advocate. First, he told them that no such case ever occurred and then, after insistence on the subject, told Playdon that it "would not be appropriate for me to… disclose the details". Filing a complaint in 1998 to then Home Secretary Michael Howard, she was finally given the ability to view the legal documents from Forbes's trial. After the Succession to the Crown Act 2013 failed to fix the issue among hereditary peers and trans cases regarding inheritance continued, Playdon decided to continue her research on the legal history and compile a book on the subject.

== Content ==
The book discusses the life history of aristocrat Ewan Forbes who was assigned female at birth and, from a young age of six, was observed by his family to act purposefully as a boy. Supported by his mother, he was allowed to access medical specialists from the age of 15 and was given an early version of synthetically produced testosterone as hormone therapy. This allowed him to go through a male puberty with male secondary sex characteristics. At that time in the 1930s, it was allowed for trans individuals to go through transition and then alter their birth certificates of their own accord, without requiring approval through a certificate as has become required through the Gender Recognition Act 2004. This was done by Forbes, who then was married to a woman, and became a general practitioner. But the issue of his transition became a legal problem after both his father and elder brother died, making him next in line of succession for the baronetcy.

A cousin of the family contested the inheritance, leading to a Scottish court case in 1968 and his legal team had to deal with a problem in common understanding of the terminology that had changed recently. Prior to that decade, trans individuals were considered a subset of intersex conditions, but psychiatrists pushed in the 1960s for being transgender to be labelled as a mental illness. This not only threatened his inheritance, but also his marriage, as if declared female by the courts, his marriage would be considered perjury, as same-sex marriage was not legal at the time. Opting for a private trial so as not to have his personal life exposed to the general public, Forbes agreed to an examination by doctors and to pay for the legal fees of the prosecution. Although the doctors defined Forbes as having "female anatomy with some male characteristics", he was able to use some obtained tissue of the testes from another individual to act as his own, resulting in him winning the case. This allowed for a legal precedent for trans individuals to win cases of primogeniture inheritance and became a threat to the aristocracy of the time, resulting in them silencing the results of the court decision so that it could not be used as a reference in subsequent trials.

Corbett v Corbett, an English legal case in 1970 concerned April Ashley and her husband, Arthur Corbett. He tried to have an annulment of their marriage in order to not have to split their wealth in the divorce. Corbett argued that because Ashley was transgender, their marriage was not legal from the beginning, despite Ashley having fully transitioned and Corbett being aware of her trans background prior to their marriage. He argued based on her having not changed her birth certificate that the marriage was void. The trial judge forced the lawyers for the defence to not mention the two-years-prior Forbes precedent case and also made the doctors involved in the physical examination redo the medical inspection after they stated Ashley had a "perfectly usual vagina". They again reported that there was no exception to their inspection and the judge instead ruled in Corbett's favour despite the evidence, stating that Ashley was a "homosexual transvestite who's mentally ill". This resulted in the Corbett v Corbett trial serving as the precedent for later cases, with the Forbes trial continuing to be suppressed from public knowledge.

Both the beginning and the end of the book also discuss other events going on prior to Forbes's case and more contemporarily involving trans rights, including the first 1931 gender transition done for Lili Elbe and more recent film depictions of trans people as mass murderers in media such as Dressed to Kill and The Silence of the Lambs. Playdon also brings up and discusses current legal issues the trans community faces, including bathroom bills and opposition from both religious fundamentalist groups and trans exclusionary radical feminists.

== Critical reception ==
Kirkus Reviews praised Playdon for successfully combing through all of the available evidence on Forbes's case despite having no personal documents of Forbes to use as background and concluded that the work is a "thoughtful and well-researched historical excavation of an important chapter in the fight for trans rights". Sarah Schulman, writing for The New York Times, described the book as "erudite, passionate, occasionally frustrating, yet ultimately persuasive" in the subject matter and history it describes. In The Sunday Times, Christina Patterson described Playdon as a "skilful storyteller" and while the history "may be right" regarding the threat to primogeniture the case held, Patterson found the "polemic" of the book regarding the reason behind the judge's decisions in the case and discussion of trans-exclusionary radical feminists in recent history to be unconvincing. The Times reviewer Sarah Ditum described the book as "less than thrilling" due to the details of the case included and considered Playdon's discussion of the gender spectrum "scientifically eccentric" and overall called the work a "campaigner's book".

Rebekah Kati for the Library Journal concluded that the book was a "fascinating look into the changing landscape of trans rights in the United Kingdom" and recommended it for anyone who wants to know how trans rights have changed over time. Writing in The Herald, reviewer Dani Garavelli lamented the lack of personal details about Forbes's opinion and stances on subjects due to never keeping private writings and wished that Playdon had characterized the conflict with Forbes's sister Margaret differently due to the issue of Margaret being the eldest sibling and a lesbian, making her unable to be the heir for the baronetcy and being unable to marry her partner. Garavelli concludes that the book's convincing argument came from "the ability to empathise with Forbes's suffering, much more than [Playdon's] proselytizing, that left me wondering why society makes it so difficult for trans people to be themselves." Patrick Strudwick in the i newspaper referred to the book as "one of the most important pieces of investigative journalism ever written about trans people". For The Times Literary Supplement, Christine Burns considered the book to successfully be a "complex story compellingly told" for its ability to fully consider all the aspects of Forbes's case and subsequent events.

As a part of the Australian Book Review December 2021 issue, Yves Rees positively described the book's courtroom scenes as "a tour de force of empathetic history" and considered Playdon to be the "ideal person" to be writing on this history. Rees ultimately says that the book promises to "do powerful work in service of trans liberation" alongside other publications of 2021 such as Shon Faye's The Transgender Issue and Finn Mackay's Female Masculinities and the Gender Wars. Hugo Vickers as a reviewer for The Oldie complimented the ambitious nature of the book as a general trans history coverage of the past century interspersed with Forbes's life story, noting that he as a "general reader" would have gotten lost in the former without the latter to keep as a steady throughline of the book's historical plot. Giving the book a 4 out of 5 rating in The Daily Telegraph, Tanya Gold commented on just how "typically British" it is that the topic of the trans experience in Britain would end up being about the complicated and "ever-fascinating prism" of the class system of the country. Covering the book for The Law Society Gazette, Luke Williams pointed out that while the work may have a "limited relevance to day-to-day practice" for lawyers, the information regarding cases like Corbett v Corbett and their impact on the legal profession in the UK since is "invaluable" and those cases serve as a "timely reminder of what can happen" on a quote from the Forbes case judge discussed in the book that "there are some interests that it is more important to protect than the rights of individuals".

== See also ==
- LGBT history
- Timeline of LGBT history in the United Kingdom
- List of transgender publications
- 2021 in literature
