= 1911 Glasgow Tradeston by-election =

UK parliamentary by-election

The 1911 Glasgow Tradeston by-election was a Parliamentary by-election held on 6 July 1911. It returned one Member of Parliament (MP) to the House of Commons of the Parliament of the United Kingdom, elected by the first past the post voting system.

The constituency was created in 1885 and elected Liberal Archibald Corbett as their MP from then until he retired from the House of Commons in 1911 to take a seat in the House of Lords as 1st Baron Rowallan. Although Tradeston had consistently voted for Corbett, he did not consistently stand under the same label. In 1885 he stood as a Liberal against a Conservative. In 1886 following a split in the Liberal party he stood as a Liberal Unionist against a Liberal. Thereafter this was the normal contest until 1910. He had re-joined the Liberal party in 1908 but he did not win the official Liberal nomination in January 1910. This time standing as an Independent Liberal he scraped a victory against both Liberal and Conservative candidates. Then at the last general election, standing as the official Liberal candidate he won comfortably.

The local Liberal association finally settled on J. D. White to defend the seat. He had been Liberal MP for Dunbartonshire before standing down at the last election. They had considered James Hogge and Junior Minister Charles Masterman, and settled on Masterman before he withdrew to contest the 1911 Bethnal Green South West by-election. The new Unionist candidate was Conservative John Henry Watts, who had opposed James Keir Hardie at Merthyr Tydfil at the general election.

The turnout was substantially down on the general election, meaning that while White won the seat for the Liberals with a massive swing of 17.6%, he received fewer votes than Corbett had.

Due to the outbreak of war, the subsequent general election did not take place until 1918. The Unionist Henderson was the endorsed candidate of the Coalition Government and won comfortably. After losing Glasgow Tradeston, White briefly joined the Labour party and stood as a Labour candidate on two occasions.

== Previous election ==
General election Dec 1910: Glasgow Tradeston Electorate
| Party | Candidate | Votes | % | ±% |
|---|---|---|---|---|
| Liberal | Archibald Corbett | 4,811 | 60.5 | +28.7 |
| Liberal Unionist | Archibald Pollock Main | 3,137 | 39.5 | +6.5 |
| Majority | | 1,674 | 21.1 | N/A |
| Turnout | | 7,948 | 82.7 | −4.3 |
| Liberal gain from Independent Liberal | | Swing | | |

== Result ==
Glasgow Tradeston by-election, 1911
| Party | Candidate | Votes | % | ±% |
|---|---|---|---|---|
| Liberal | J. D. White | 3,869 | 58.16 | −2.37 |
| Liberal Unionist | John Henry Watts | 2,783 | 41.84 | +2.37 |
| Majority | | 1,086 | 16.32 | −4.74 |
| Turnout | | 6,652 | 69.23 | −13.48 |
| Registered electors | | 9,609 | | |
| Liberal hold | | Swing | −2.37 | |

== Following election ==
General election 14 December 1918: Glasgow Tradeston Electorate 35,960
| Party | Candidate | Votes | % | ±% |
|---|---|---|---|---|
| Unionist | Vivian Henderson | 12,250 | 63.2 | +41.3 |
| British Socialist Party | James Dunlop MacDougall | 3,751 | 19.4 | New |
| Liberal | J. D. White | 3,369 | 16.4 | −71.7 |
| Majority | | 8,499 | 43.8 | N/A |
| Turnout | | 19,370 | 53.9 | −28.8 |
| Unionist gain from Liberal | | Swing | +33.4 | |
