= John Corbett, 4th Baron Rowallan =

British hereditary peer (born 1947)

John Polson Cameron Corbett, 4th Baron Rowallan (born 8 March 1947), is a British hereditary peer. He is the son of Arthur Corbett, 3rd Baron Rowallan, and Eleanor Mary Boyle. He is usually known as Johnny Corbett or Johnny Rowallan.

== Biography ==
He was educated at Eton College and the Royal Agricultural College.

He contested Glasgow Garscadden in the October 1974 general election and Kilmarnock in the 1979 general election as a Conservative.

He inherited Rowallan Castle, the family seat, directly from his grandfather, the 2nd Baron Rowallan, in 1977. The 2nd Baron had disinherited his eldest son and heir, Arthur Corbett, John's father. He sat in the House of Lords from 1995 to 1999 when, along with almost all other hereditary peers, he lost his automatic right to a seat with the passage of the House of Lords Act 1999.

He runs the Rowallan Activity Centre, an equestrian centre near Meikle Mosside, Fenwick in Ayrshire, with his third wife, Claire, Baroness Rowallan, and her daughter, Sophie Dinning, a former international showjumper. He was chair of British Showjumping from 1998 to 2011.

== Marriages ==
He married his first wife Susan Jane Diane Green, daughter of James Green, in 1971. Together they had two children:

- Hon. Jason William Polson Cameron Corbett (born 21 April 1972)
- Hon. Joanna Gwyn Alice Corbett (born 8 June 1974).

He married his second wife Sandrew Filomena Bryson, daughter of William Bryson, in 1984. They had two children together:

- Hon. Jonathan Arthur Cameron Corbett (born 3 March 1985)
- Hon. Soay Mairi Cameron Corbett (born 16 March 1988).

Lord Rowallan married, thirdly, Claire Dinning Laidler, his present wife, daughter of Robert Laidler, in 1995, without issue.

== Arms ==
Coat of arms of John Corbett, 4th Baron Rowallan
Crest A branch of oak thereon a raven Sable. Escutcheon Quarterly 1st & 4th Argent a key fesseways wards downwards between two ravens Sable (Corbett) 2nd & 3rd Azure a chevron Or between two bears' heads couped Argent muzzled Gules in chief and in base a cross moline of the third (Polson). Supporters Dexter a salmon Proper holding in its mouth a jewelled ring Or, Sinister a seal Proper. Motto Deus Pascit Corvos

Peerage of the United Kingdom
Preceded by Arthur Corbett	Baron Rowallan; 1993–present Member of the House of Lords (1995–1999)	Incumbent; Heir apparent: Hon. Jason Corbett
