= W v Registrar of Marriages =

Case decided by the Hong Kong Court of Final Appeal

W v. Registrar of Marriages
- Judiciary of Hong Kong
- Court: Court of Final Appeal
- Full case name: W v. the Registrar of Marriages
- Argued: 2013-04-15 to 2013-04-16
- Decided: 13 May 2013 (original judgement); 16 July 2013 (supplementary judgement)
- Citation: [2013] HKCFA 39; FACV 4/2012; [2013] 3 HKLRD 90
- Transcripts: Text of Judgement, Court of Final Appeal; Text of Supplementary Judgement, Court of Final Appeal

Case history
- Appealed from: Court of Appeal

Court membership
- Judges sitting: Chief Justice Geoffrey Ma; Permanent Judge Patrick Chan; Permanent Judge Robert Ribeiro; Non-Permanent Judge Kemal Bokhary; Non-Permanent Judge Lord Hoffmann

Keywords
- Family law - Marriages - LGBT rights - Transgender

W v Registrar of Marriages [2013] HKCFA 39; FACV 4/2012 (Chinese: W訴婚姻登記官) is a landmark court case for LGBTQ rights in Hong Kong. In a 4:1 decision, the Court of Final Appeal gave transgender people the right to marry as their affirmed gender rather than their assigned gender (referred to in the decision as 'biological sex') at birth.

== Background ==
The applicant of the case was only identified as W and assigned male at birth. However, W was subsequently diagnosed with gender dysphoria. W started receiving medical treatments since 2005. After having successfully undergone sex reassignment surgery in 2008, she was issued with a new identity card and a passport reflecting her sex as female. In November 2008, W hired a lawyer to confirm with the Registry of Marriages whether or not she could marry her boyfriend. W was denied.

The Registrar denied W to marry her boyfriend because her assigned sex was recorded as male on her birth certificate. Hong Kong does not allow same sex marriage. The Government contended it only accepted one's sex as originally assigned on the birth certificate for marriages purposes, regardless of one's current identity card or passport.

Subsequently, W believed the Registrar's refusal had violated her constitutional right to marry as well as her right to privacy and brought the case to court for judicial review. In the Court of First Instance, Justice Andrew Cheung (as Cheung PJ then was) upheld the Registrar's decision, and the Court of Appeal dismissed an appeal; thus W appealed her case to the Court of Final Appeal. On 13 May 2013, the Court of Final Appeal overturned the Register's decision and held that W could marry her boyfriend. The Court of Final Appeal, however, issued a stay to put the decision of letting W to marry her boyfriend on hold for a year to allow time for the Government to amend the law.

_{(Court of Final Appeal judgment paragraphs 2, 19, 20, 58, 60)}

== Important facts ==
The Court of Final Appeal observed the following facts.

- Transsexualism (gender identity disorder and gender dysphoria) is a medical condition identified by the Hong Kong government as well as WHO under ICD-10.
- In the medical field, one's sexual identity consists of a list of both biological and psychological identity
- The only accepted therapy for transsexualism involves a series of hormonal treatments as well as sex reassignment surgery.
- Sex reassignment surgery is irreversible, publicly funded, and managed by the Hospital Authority.
- The Hospital Authority will issue a 'sex changed certificate' after sex reassignment surgery.
- The Immigration Department will issue a new identity card and a passport to individuals with 'sex changed certificates' issued by the Hospital Authority or by overseas government agencies.

_{(Court of Final Appeal judgement paragraphs 5, 6, 11, 14-17)}

== Major issues ==
The Court of Final Appeal was presented with two issues to solve in the case:

- Issue 1

Has the Registrar for Marriages misunderstood the Marriage Ordinance in coming to the conclusion precluding Ms W from marrying her male partner?

- Issue 2

If the Registrar was correct, is the Marriage Ordinance as it is understood compatible with the right to marry or to privacy guaranteed by the Basic Law and the Bill of Rights Ordinance?

_{(Court of Final Appeal judgement paragraph 4)}

== Related statutes and precedent cases ==
Provisions	Title	Script
Marriage Ordinance; Section 40	Marriages under this Ordinance are Christian or equivalent thereto	(1) Every marriage under this Ordinance shall be a Christian marriage or the civil equivalent of a Christian marriage. (2) The expression "Christian marriage or the civil equivalent of a Christian marriage" implies a formal ceremony recognized by the law as involving the voluntary union for life of one man and one woman to the exclusion of all others.
Matrimonial Causes Ordinance; Section 20	Grounds for decree of nullity	(1) A marriage which takes place after 30 June 1972 shall be void on any of the following grounds only: ... (d) that the parties are not respectively male and female.
Basic Law; Article 37	Fundamental Rights and Duties of the Residents	The freedom of marriage of Hong Kong residents and their right to raise a family freely shall be protected by law.
Hong Kong Bill of Rights Ordinance; Article 19	Rights in respect of marriage and family	(2) The right of men and women of marriageable age to marry and to found a family shall be recognized.
European Convention on Human Rights; Article 12	Right to marry	Men and women of marriageable age have the right to marry and to found a family, according to the national laws governing the exercise of this right.

Precedent Referred to in Current Case	Points Referred to in Precedent
Hyde v Hyde (decided in 1866)	Christian marriage is defined as the voluntary union for life of one man and one woman to the exclusion of all others; _{(judgement paragraph 29)}
Corbett v Corbett (decided in 1971)	Family is built on the institution of marriage; The ability to engage in heterosexual intercourse is essential to marriage because of procreation; When determining one's sex for marriage purposes, only biological factors at birth is appropriate because of procreation.; _{(judgement paragraphs 28, 30, 31-32, 34-35)}
Goodwin v UK (decided in 2002)	The right to found a family was not a condition of the right to marry; The principal unchanging biological aspect of gender identity is the chromosomal element. It is not apparent to the Court that the chromosomal element, amongst all the others, must inevitably take on decisive significance for the purposes of legal attribution of gender identity for transsexuals.; The test of congruent biological factors can no longer be decisive in denying legal recognition to the change of gender of a post-operative transsexual. There are other important factors—the acceptance of the condition of gender identity disorder by the medical professions.; The applicant lives as a woman, is in a relationship with a man and would only wish to marry a man. She has no possibility of doing so. In the Court's view, she may therefore claim that the very essence of her right to marry has been infringed.; _{(judgement paragraph 77)}

== Arguments and reasoning ==
=== Issue 1 ===
The following table lists out the government's arguments to demonstrate that the Registrar did not misunderstand the meaning of the words ‘woman’ and ‘female’ in the two Ordinances as well as the Court's reasoning related to each argument.

Government's Arguments	Court of Final Appeal's Reasoning
—N/a	Hong Kong defines marriage as in Corbett, which derived the definition from Hyde, based on the Christian definition of ‘the voluntary union for life of one man and one woman to the exclusion of all others’. _{(judgement paragraphs 25, 29, 30 & 48)}
The Registrar should use Corbett’s criteria to determine W’s sex because the Ordinances were enacted in light of that case. _{(judgement paragraph 48)}	Agreed and accepted _{(judgement paragraph 48)}
Using Corbett, the Register did correctly construe the Ordinances and accordingly refuse W to marry her boyfriend. _{(judgement paragraph 49)}	Agreed and accepted _{(judgement paragraph 49)}
The ordinary and dictionary meaning of the word ‘women’ does not include transgender women; and the Ordinances should be so construed. Also, normally, if there should be any updates of meanings (of the word ‘woman’), the legislature will always do so. Yet, it has not and there is no evidence for such need. _{(judgement paragraphs 50-53)}	When construing a legal provision, the ordinary meaning of a word should not obscure the context and purpose of that provision. Since the Court construed the law from the perspective of the legislative intention in this case, the Court chose not to address this argument. _{(judgement paragraphs 50-53)}
Since non-consummation is a legitimate reason to void a marriage, it shows that procreation is an important characteristic and purpose of marriage. _{(judgement paragraphs 54-55)}	Consummation is defined as full sexual penetration even without any emission or conception. Because transgender women do have the ability to have sex, the Court found this argument irrelevant to this case. _{(judgement paragraphs 54-55)}
If construing the law in a way other than applying Corbett, it would involve a lot of ramifications. Thus, it should be left to the legislature to decide. _{(judgement paragraphs 56-57)}	Since the Court found the Registrar had correctly construed and applied the law, the Court refused to address this argument. _{(judgement paragraphs 56-57)}

=== Issue 2 ===
In the attempt to resolve Issue 2 of whether the Registrar's understanding of the Ordinances had been unconstitutional as infringing the rights to marry and to privacy, the Court broke down the analysis as in the following table and so found them unconstitutional.

Government's Arguments	Court of Final Appeal's Reasoning
—N/a	Instead of treating the right to marry as an absolute right, the Court saw it as a strong right which means that it may be subject to other legal regulation. The Court, however, emphasised that such legal regulation must not do so in a way that would impair the essence of the right to marry. _{(judgement paragraphs 65-68)}
—N/a	In construing the right to marry in Article 37 of the Basic Law and in Article 19(2) of the Bill of Rights Ordinance, the Court accepted that the two articles were the same in substance in different phrasing. The Court also noted that both of these articles guaranteed the right to marry and the right to found a family with an emphasis that the second component of founding a family was not a prerequisite for the right to marry. _{(judgement paragraphs 63-64, 77)}
—N/a	The Court noted the European Court of Human Rights’ decision in Goodwin, with the House of Lords’ approval, overturned Corbett. The Court quoted that ECHR had found ‘that it is artificial to assert that post-operative transsexuals have not been deprived of the right to marry as, according to law, they remain able to marry a person of their former opposite sex. The applicant in this case lives as a woman, is in a relationship with a man and would only wish to marry a man. She has no possibility of doing so. In the Court's view, she may therefore claim that the very essence of her right to marry has been infringed’. _{(judgement paragraphs 77-79)}
The Government argued that the framers of the Basic Law and the Bill of Rights Ordinance, incorporating ICCPR, implicitly adopted the Corbett’s definition in terms of marriage and one's sex as well when drafting them. The Court should thus so construe. _{(judgement paragraphs 81-82)}	The Court held a different view and reasoned that the Basic Law and the Bill of Rights Ordinance were living instruments intended to meet ever changing needs and circumstances; even the framers had had Corbett’s definitions in terms of marriage and one’s sex in their minds when drafting the constitutional documents, the changes in societal perception of marriage, particularly the abandonment of the concept of procreation being essential to marriage, called for re-examination of the applicability of Corbett. _{(judgement paragraphs 84-89)}
The Government repeated the argument made earlier that any way of construing the Ordinances other that using Corbett should be left to the legislature to decide. _{(judgement paragraph 83)}	The Court observed evidence showing the advance in medical knowledge of and the change in social attitudes towards transsexualism. And such advancement demonstrated the inadequacy of Corbett’s definitions. Instead of considering only biological factors, it should take into account of all aspects, including biological, psychological, and social elements, when assessing one’s sex. This inadequacy unconstitutionally impaired transgender people’s right to marry. The Court was thus constitutionally compelled to act. _{(judgement paragraph 61-62, 90-111)}
The Government argued that the Court should not rule until there had been a general consensus allowing transsexuals to marry among Hong Kongers. _{(judgement paragraph 113)}	The Court refused to accept such rationale and explained that the ‘reliance on the absence of majority consensus as a reason for rejecting a minority’s claim is inimical in principle to fundamental rights’. The Court also emphasised that ‘it is one thing to have regard to such changes [in societal opinion] as a basis for accepting a more generous interpretation of a fundamental right and quite another to point to the absence of a majority consensus as a reason for denying recognition of minority rights.’ _{(judgement paragraphs 114-116)}

== Holding ==
- Issue 1

The Court of Final Appeal held that the Registrar had been correct in construing the Ordinances using Corbett’s definition of a person’s sex.

_{(judgement paragraph 117)}

- Issue 2

The Court of Final Appeal held that Corbett’s definition of one’s sex was inadequate and too restrictive to only include biological factors and resulted in unconstitutional infringement of W’s right to marry guaranteed by Article 37 of the Basic Law and by Article 19(2) of the Bill of Rights.

_{(judgement paragraphs 118-119)}

== Court's orders ==
=== Judicial remedies ===
The Court of Final Appeal issued the following orders:

- A declaration that W is entitled to be included in the meaning of the word ‘woman’ in Section 20(1)(d) of the Matrimonial Causes Ordinance and in Section 40 of the Marriage Ordinance to marry a man.
- A declaration that the meaning of the words of ‘woman’ and ‘female’ of the Matrimonial Causes Ordinance and of the Marriage Ordinance should include post-operative male-to-female transsexuals with certificates issued by medical authorities testifying their change of gender as a result of sex reassignment surgery.
- A stay for a year for the two declarations going into effect.

_{(judgement paragraphs 120 & 150; supplementary judgement paragraph 11)}

=== Court's suggestion for legislation ===
In addition to the two declarations and a stay, the Court left open the question of at which point a transsexual should be considered to successfully have the sex changed for marriage purposes as well as for other legal areas. The Court agreed that it would be particularly beneficial for enacting primary legislation to address this problem and also suggested the Government to consider the UK's Gender Recognition Act 2004 in addressing this problem.

_{(judgement paragraphs 120, 127-146)}

== Significance ==
- Transsexuals who are certified by either local or foreign medical authorities to successfully have their sex changed are entitled to marry in their acquired sex.
- The right to marry and the right to found a family are two independent rights, rather than a prerequisite to one another, even they exist within the same provision of the law.
- The case creates a precedent that the lack of consensus cannot be cited as a reason to deny minority's fundamental rights.

== Aftermath ==
Marriage (Amendment) Bill 2014

Legislative Council of Hong Kong
- Long title: A Bill to amend the Marriage Ordinance to provide that, for determining the sex of the parties to a marriage, a person who has received a full sex re-assignment surgery is to be treated as being of the sex to which the person is re-assigned; and to provide for related matters.

Legislative history
- Introduced by: Lai Tung Kwok, Secretary for Security
- Introduced: 19 March 2014
- First reading: 19 March 2014
- Second reading: 22 October 2014
- Voting summary: 11 voted for; 40 voted against; 5 abstained; 13 absent; 1 present not voting
- Status: Not passed

=== Marriage (Amendment) Bill 2014 ===
In response to the court's decision, the government introduced the Marriage (Amendment) Bill 2014, which, if passed, would amend the Marriage Ordinance to allow post-SRS transgender people to marry in their affirmed gender. The bill was gazetted on 28 February 2014 and subsequently introduced by Secretary for Security Lai Tung Kwok for its first reading in the Legislative Council on 19 March 2014. The government stated that while the court's order would go into effect regardless of whether the legislation was passed, the bill's passage was important to maintain the rule of law in Hong Kong and to align statutory language with the current state of the law.

At its meeting on 21 March 2014, the House Committee resolved to form a bills committee to study the bill, which met for the first time on 1 April 2014.

Upon the resumption of the second reading debate on 22 October 2014, the bill was voted down by equal numbers of pro-democratic and pro-establishment legislators, with only 11 pro-establishment lawmakers voting in support. The liberal pro-democratic lawmakers objected to the inclusion of the SRS requirement, which they viewed as inhumane.

==== Public response ====
The bill was criticised by LGBT activists, the Law Society, the Equal Opportunities Commission, and a number of other organisations for effectively coercing transgender people into undergoing potentially "dehumanising" surgical procedures that would render them sterile, resulting in a violation of their constitutional rights to marriage, reproduction, privacy, and family life. A trans woman speaking at a meeting of the bills committee considering the bill called the SRS requirement "cruel" and "inhumane".

The bill was also opposed by conservative Christians, who claimed that the bill would "confuse gender identities" and might "encourage youngsters with doubts about their sexual identity" to "become homosexuals".
