= Baron Rowallan =

Barony in the Peerage of the United Kingdom

Baron Rowallan, of Rowallan in the County of Ayr, is a title in the Peerage of the United Kingdom. It was created in 1911 for the Liberal politician Archibald Corbett. He had previously represented Glasgow Tradeston in the House of Commons. His son, the second Baron, fought in both World Wars, was Chief Scout and served as Governor of Tasmania. As of 2022 the title is held by the latter's grandson, the fourth Baron, who succeeded his father in 1993.

The family seat was initially Rowallan Castle, near Kilmarnock, East Ayrshire. This historic property was bequeathed by the second Baron to his grandson, the future fourth Baron, bypassing the latter's father, the third Baron, possibly because the third baron had earned disrepute in a highly unusual divorce suit against his second wife, April Ashley. The fourth Baron now resides at Meikle Mosside Farm, near Fenwick, Ayrshire, which may now be regarded as the family seat.

== Barons Rowallan (1911) ==
- Archibald Cameron Corbett, 1st Baron Rowallan (1856–1933)
- Thomas Godfrey Polson Corbett, 2nd Baron Rowallan (1895–1977)
- Arthur Cameron Corbett, 3rd Baron Rowallan (1919–1993)
- John Polson Cameron Corbett, 4th Baron Rowallan (b. 1947)

The heir apparent is the present holder's son the Hon. Jason William Polson Cameron Corbett (b. 1972).
The heir apparent's heir apparent is his son Alexander William Cameron Corbett (b. 2004)

== Arms ==
Coat of arms of Baron Rowallan
Crest A branch of oak thereon a raven Sable. Escutcheon Quarterly 1st & 4th Argent a key fesseways wards downwards between two ravens Sable (Corbett) 2nd & 3rd Azure a chevron Or between two bears’ heads couped Argent muzzled Gules in chief and in base a cross moline of the third (Polson). Supporters Dexter a salmon Proper holding in its mouth a jewelled ring Or sinister a seal Proper. Motto Deus Pascit Corvos
