= Tom Henderson (Labour politician) =

Scottish Labour and Co-operative politician

Thomas Henderson CBE (1867/1868 – 28 January 1960) was a Scottish Labour and Co-operative politician.

Henderson was born in Burntisland, Fife. He was apprenticed as a cabinet maker at the age of eleven, but was later to work in the Clydeside and Belfast shipyards.

After nearly thirty years in Belfast, he moved to Glasgow where he was elected to the city council in 1919 as an Independent Labour Party councillor.

At the 1922 general election, he was elected as member of parliament (MP) for Glasgow Tradeston, becoming the first Co-operative MP in Scotland. He served on the executive of the National Co-operative Party. With the formation of the First Labour Government he was given the post of Comptroller of the Household and government whip for Scotland.

There was a large swing against Labour at the 1931 general election, and Henderson lost his seat. He was appointed a Commander of the Order of the British Empire in the 1931 Birthday Honours. He regained the seat at the 1935 general election, and held it until 1945, when he retired.

Henderson died in a hospital in Glasgow on 28 January 1960, aged 92.

Parliament of the United Kingdom
| Preceded by Vivian Henderson | Member of Parliament for Glasgow Tradeston; 1922–1931 | Succeeded by William McLean |
| Preceded by William McLean | Member of Parliament for Glasgow Tradeston; 1935–1945 | Succeeded by John Rankin |
Political offices
| Preceded by Sir William Cope | Comptroller of the Household; 1929–1931 | Succeeded by Goronwy Owen |
