= Rowallan Castle =

Ancient castle in Scotland

- Kilmaurs, East Ayrshire, Scotland; UK grid reference NS43474242
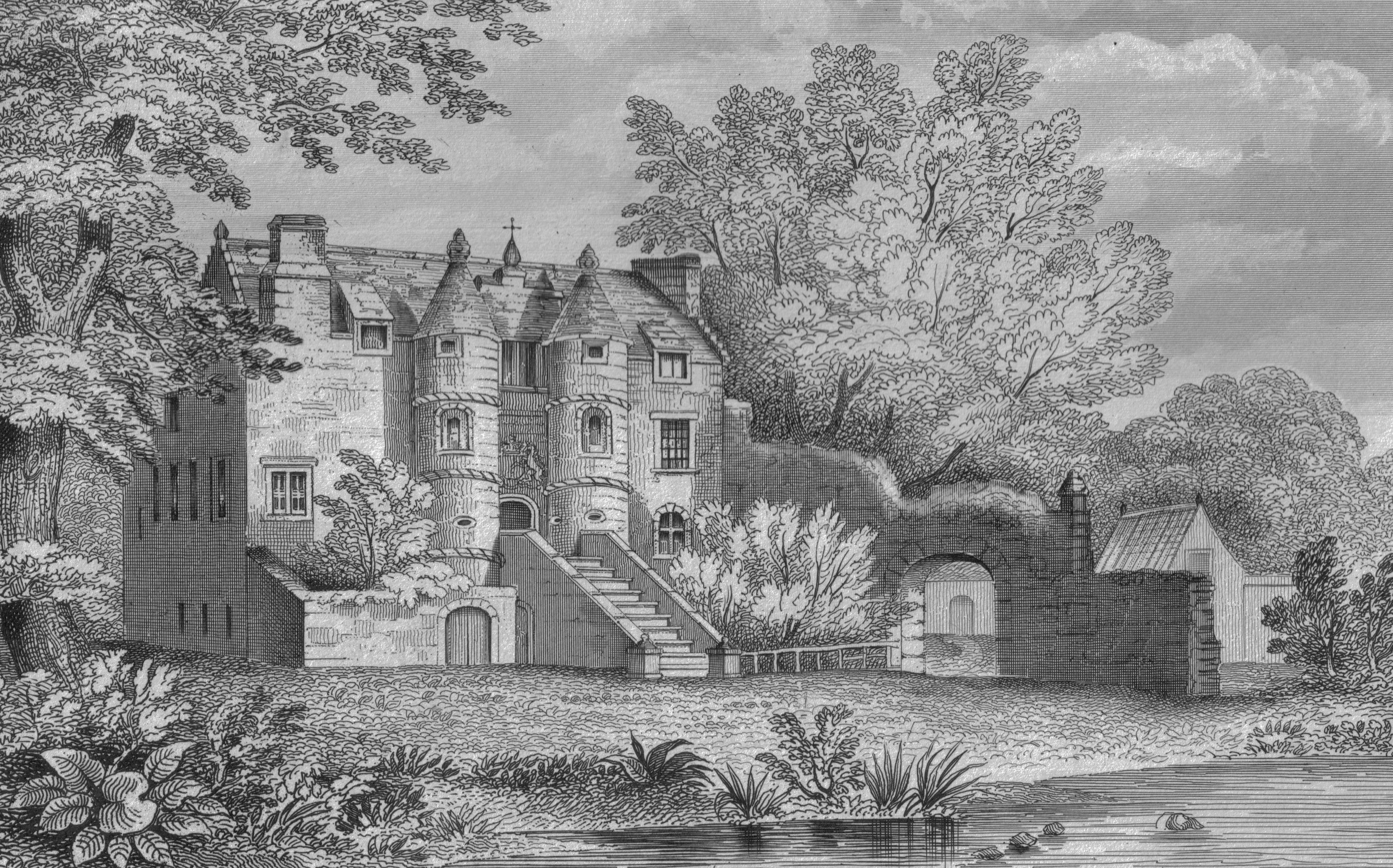
- Rowallan Castle in 1876

Site information
- Owner: Niall Campbell and family
- Controlled by: Campbell family
- Open to the public: Occasional open days
- Condition: Fully intact

Location
- Shown within East Ayrshire
- Location within East Ayrshire
- Coordinates: 55.65°N 4.488639°W

Site history
- Built: 16th century
- In use: Until 20th century
- Materials: stone

Designations

Inventory of Gardens and Designed Landscapes in Scotland
- Official name: Rowallan
- Designated: 30 June 1987
- Reference no.: GDL00333

Rowallan Castle (Scottish Gaelic: Caisteal an Rubha Àlainn) is an ancient castle located in Scotland. The castle stands on the banks of the Carmel Water, which may at one time have run much closer to the low eminence upon which the original castle stood, justifying the old name Craig of Rowallan. Elizabeth Mure (died before May 1355) was mistress and then wife of Robert, High Steward of Scotland, and Guardian of Scotland (1338–1341 and from October 1346), who later became King Robert II of Scotland. She may have been born at Rowallan.

== The history of Rowallan Castle ==
=== Owners ===
The castle and barony has been owned or held by the medieval Muir family, the (Boyle) Earls of Glasgow, the (Campbell) Earls of Loudoun, and the (Corbett) Barons Rowallan. In 1989, it returned to the Campbell family when it was purchased by Niall Campbell.

It is said that the earliest surviving piece of lute music in Scotland was written at Rowallan.

It is said to have been visited by the unfortunate King James I of Scotland when on his way from Edinburgh to England.

The first Mure holder, Sir J. Gilchrist Mure, was buried in the Mure Aisle at Kilmarnock.

=== Origins ===
The original castle is thought to date back into the 13th century. Rowallan was said to be the birth place of Elizabeth Mure (Muir), first wife of Robert, the High Steward, later Robert II of Scotland.

In 1513 John Mure of Rowallan was killed at the Battle of Flodden. In 1513 the Rowallan Estate took its present day form.

In about 1690 the estate was home to the Campbells of Loudoun, who held it into the 19th century. The former tower of Polkelly lay near Rowallan and was also held by the Mures, for a time passed to the second son until it passed by marriage to the Cunninghams of Cunninghamhead.

=== Construction and other details ===
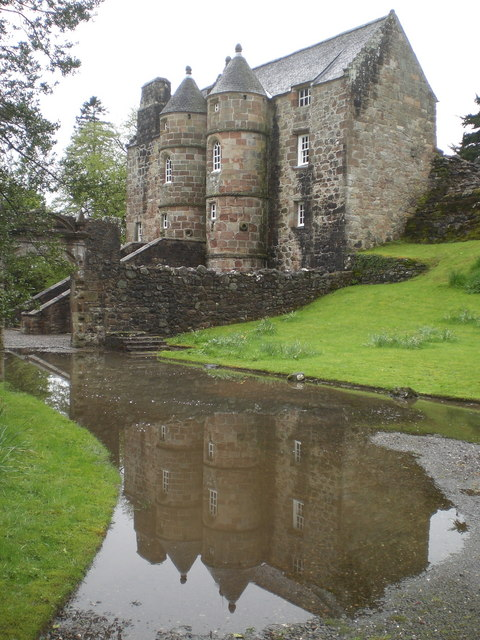
Rowallan Castle today

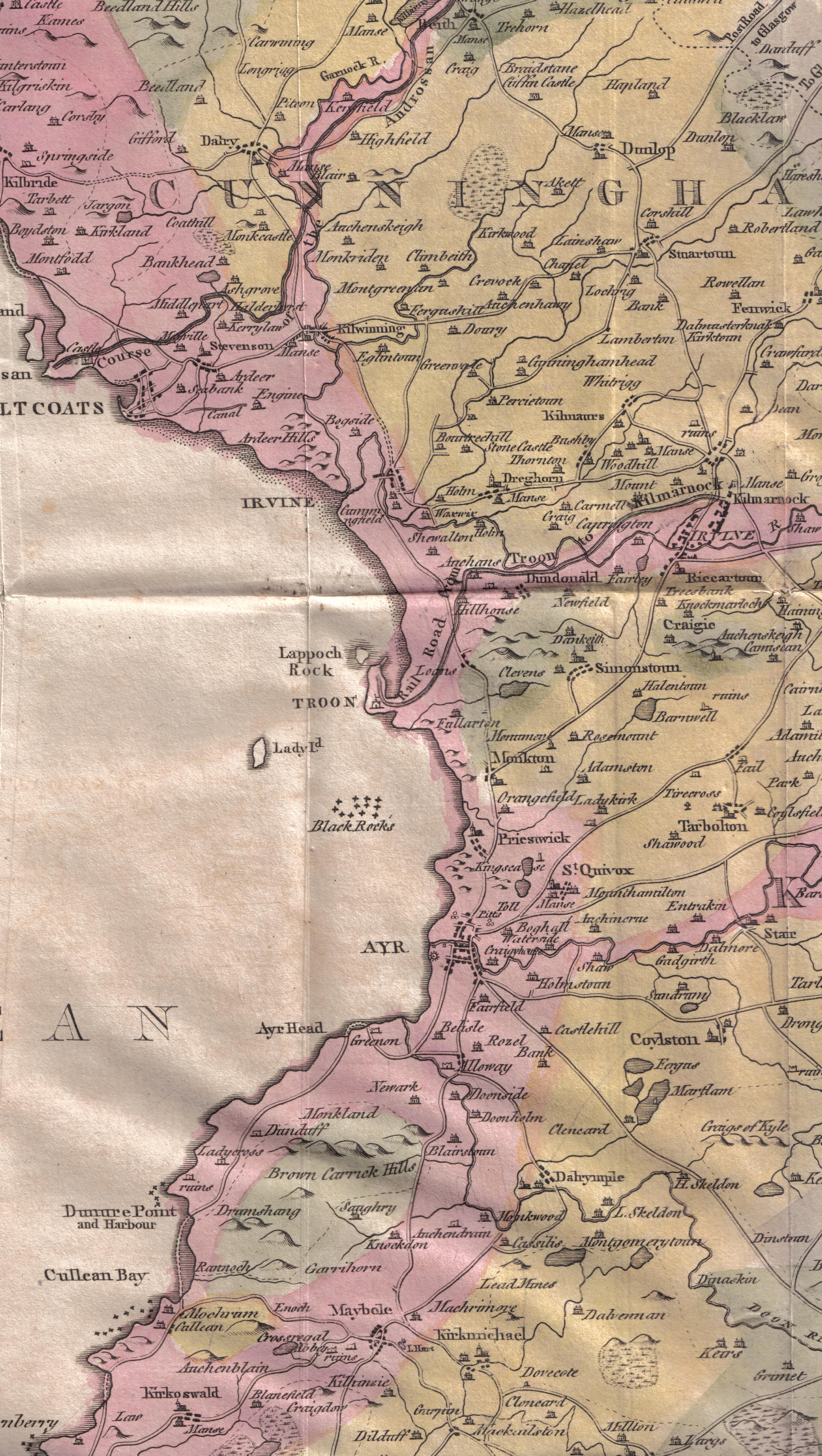
William Aiton's map of 1811 showing Rowellan (sic)

The castle is built around a small knoll and once stood in a small loch or swampy area, fed by the Carmel Burn. The southern front of the castle was erected about the year 1562 by John Mure of Rowallan and his Lady, Marion Cuninghame, of the family of Cuninghamhead. This information appears as an inscription on a marriage stone or tablet at the top of the wall: - Jon.Mvr. M.Cvgm. Spvsis 1562. The family coat of arms lies to the right. The crest of the Mure's was a Moore's head, which is sculptured near the coat of arms. This is possibly a rebus or jeu-de-mot on the Mure name, however it is suggested that it is a reference to some feat performed in the crusades against the Saracens. The Royal Arms of Scotland, fully blazoned, are carved over the main entrance, together with the shields of the Cumin family, from whom the Mures claim descent. Over the ornamented gateway is a stone with the date 1616 inscribed upon it.

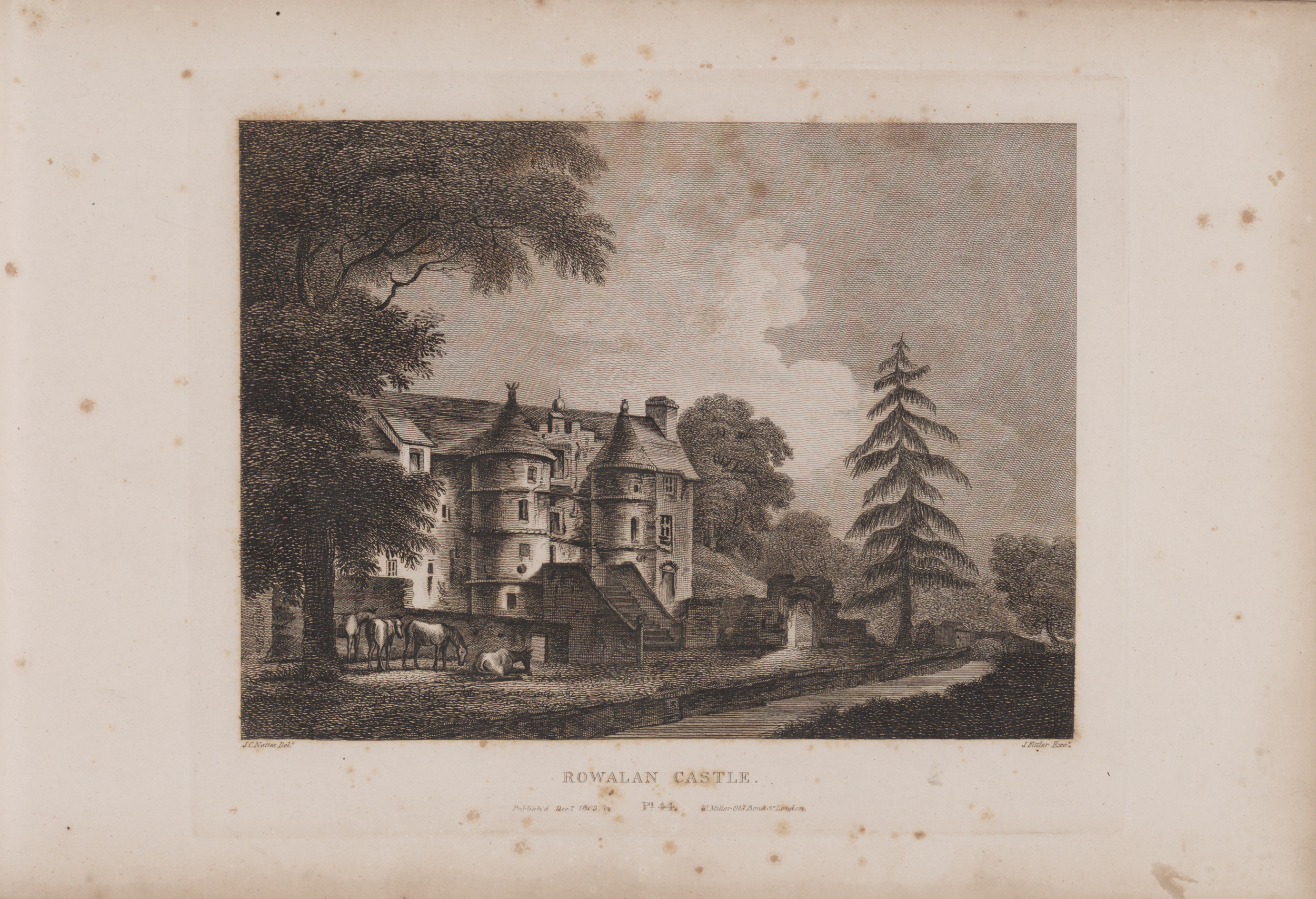
Engraving of the castle by James Fittler in Scotia Depicta, published 1804

Over the doorway of the porch is a rare inscription in Hebrew using Hebrew characters which read The Lord is the portion of mine inheritance and of my cup, Psalms. XVI, Verse 5. Doctor Bonar, moderator of the Free Church of Scotland deciphered and transled it. At the front of the castle stood a perfect example of an old loupin-on-stane. A fine well with abundant pure water was present at Rowallan. King William's well is located in the policies of Rowallan.

One of the rooms was called Lord Loudoun's sleeping apartment and Adamson records that almost every room throughout the house has its walls covered with the names and addresses of visitors. Some have also left poems or have recorded the details of their visit in verse.

Sir John and Sir William Muir took great pleasure in the erection of the various parts of Rowallan, and a record was kept of the portions completed by each. Much of their attention was also taken up with the planting of the castle policies.

One room of the castle was known as the "Woman's House," which researchers have dubbed a “quite rare” phenomenon, “evoking a lost age of gender separation, defined by [women’s] specialist work with clothes and linen” and having “the potential to inform an understanding of the role of women here and in wider society.”

In 1691 the Hearth Tax records show that the castle had twenty-two hearths and eighteen other dwellings were associated with the castle and its lands.

The 10th Countess of Loudoun was especially fond of Rowallan and spent considerable sums repairing the castle in the 19th century. Without her efforts the building would not have survived down to the present day.

==== Origin of the name Rowallan ====
There have been several suggestions as to the origin of the name Rowallan, ranging from folklore, to actual word derivation.

A folk etymology suggests, in connection with the rebus mentioned, there is a tale told of one Allan of Stewarton who was rowing a Scottish chief off the Ayrshire coast. The weather made a turn for the worse and the chief became anxious. The chief in his fear of the ocean said to Allan, Row, Allan row! Bear me to safety and you will have the rich lands of Carmelside, with silver to build yourself a castle. Hill and valley and rivers of fish will be yours .... but just row, Allan, row! Allan won his prize and named the estate 'Rowallan' after his adventure. The same story is told in the form of a poem written by the Rev. George Paxton from Kilmaurs, pastor of a Secession Church from 1789 - 1807.

Others cite Scottish Gaelic as the origin, stating 'Rubha Àlainn' means 'beautiful headland'. Yet, an effort to interpret 'Rubha Álainn' shows the phrase itself isn't even Gaelic.

Yet, a third suggestion is that 'Rowallan' is of Brythonic or Cumbric origin, especially in that this area of Scotland lived under these languages for over a thousand years before Gaelic began to take hold. Broken down, 'Ro' is the equivalent of the Welsh “Rhy” (even the Old Irish 'Ro') meaning 'too' or 'very', while 'wallan' closely mirrors the 'wallon' suffix so often seen in Welsh and Old Breton, which derives from guallaun, or ‘good/best'.

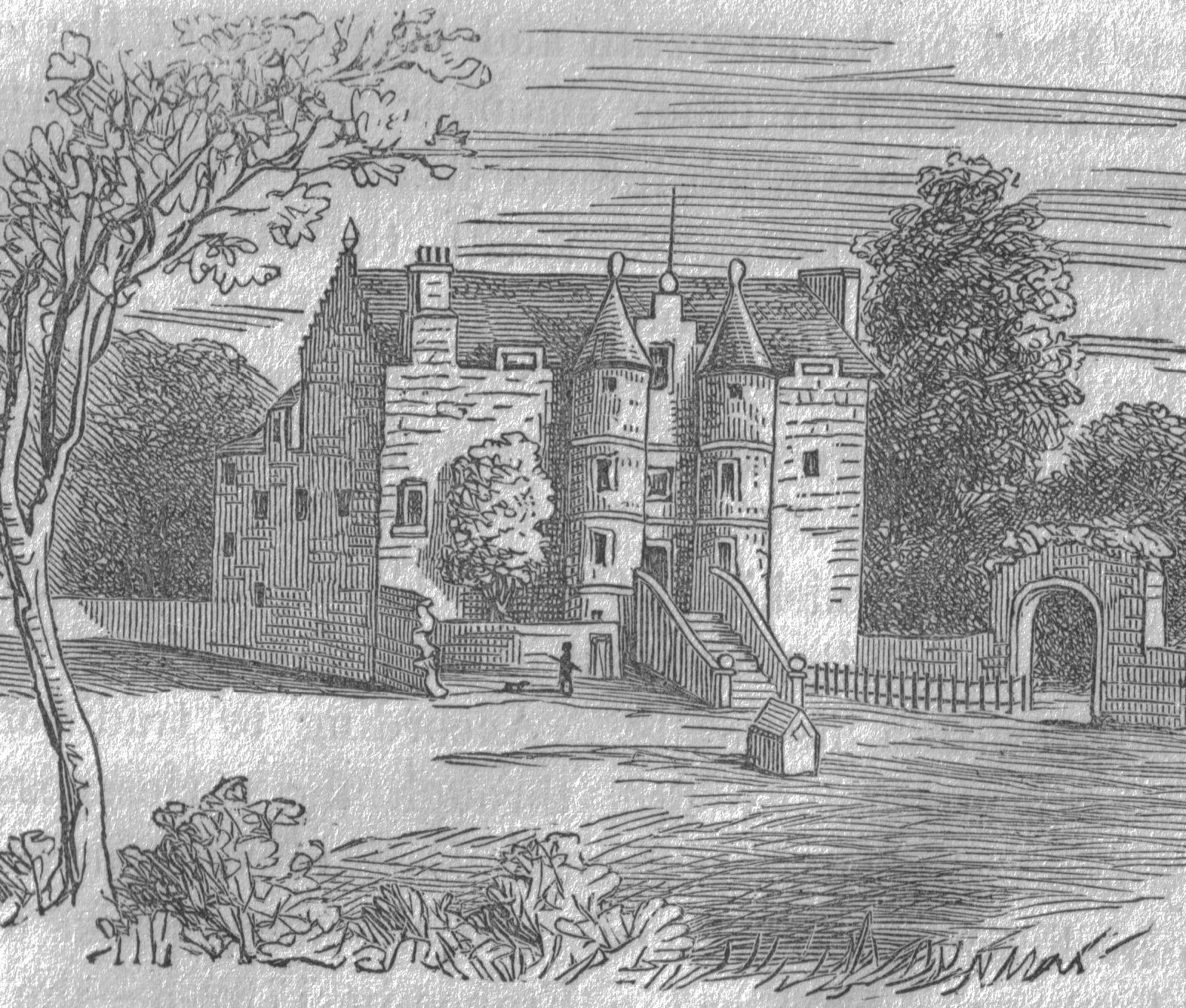
Rowallan Castle in 1866

=== Covenanting times ===
Sir William Mure wrote a history of his family and though an ardent covenanter, opposed the execution of Charles I, writing an elegy upon his death. Conventicles were not infrequently held within the mansion, which from its position was anciently called the Craig of Rowallan. For this, he fell under the suspicion of the Government, and on several occasions suffered imprisonment. Part of the old castle is called the 'Auld Kirk' in memory of covenanting days. As stated, Sir William befriended the Covenanters, and as much as possible protected his tenantry from the tyranny of the troopers who scoured the countryside at the period. He was intimate with the Rev. William Guthrie of Fenwick, who preached upon several occasions in the "auld kirk" of the castle.

In the 1640s Alasdair Mac Colla had been sent by Montrose to suppress support for the Covenanting cause. Based in Kilmarnock, he plundered the Ayrshire countryside for some days and then demanded financial penalties. Sir William Mure's penalty for preventing further plundering at Rowallan was 1,000 merks; much damage already having been done.

=== Rowallan ===
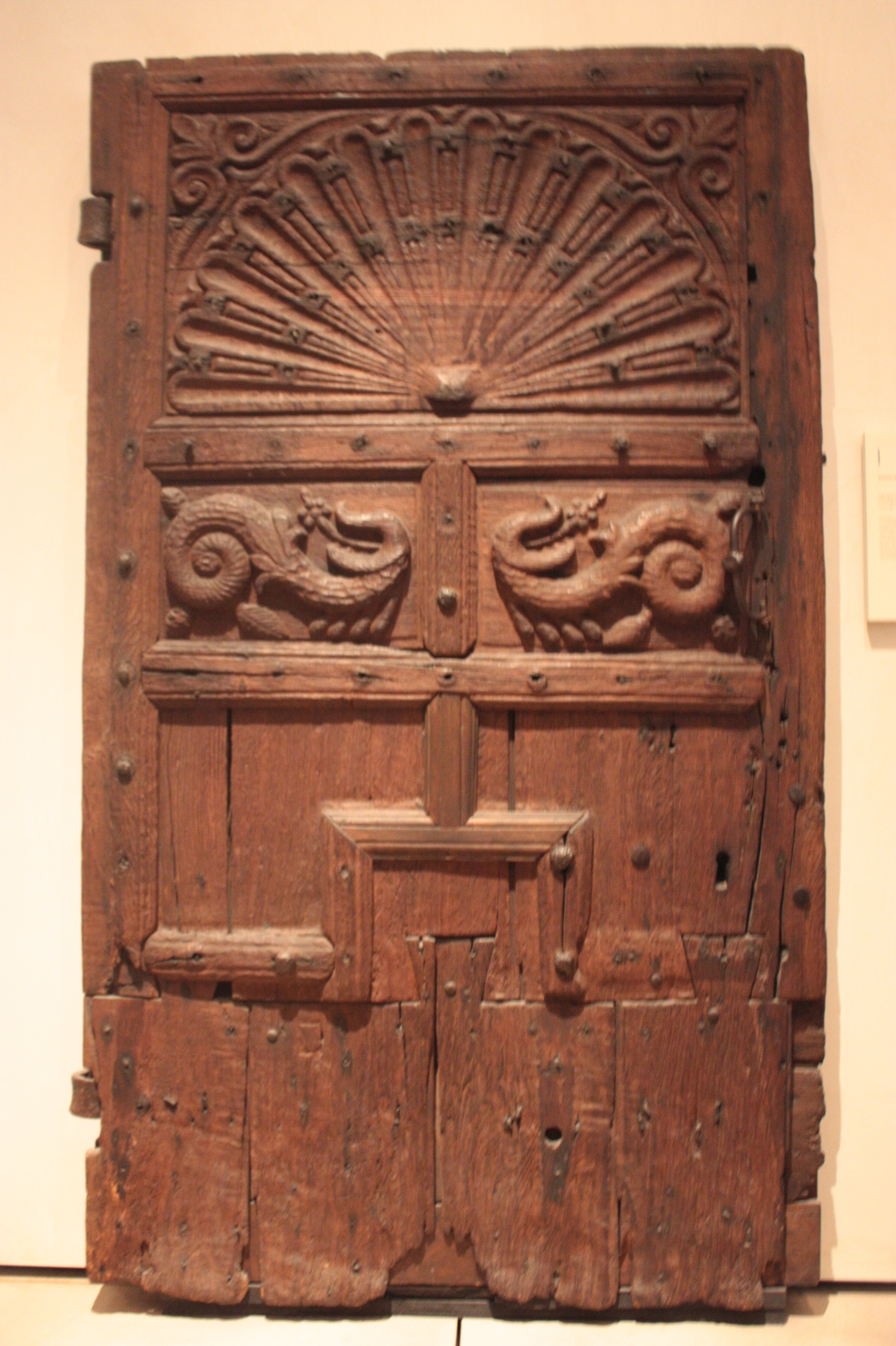
16th-century oak door from Rowallan Castle, Royal Scottish Museum

Rowallan.

Farewell unto thy rocky steep,
Thy crumbling walls and ruined keep;
In thy decay I read a page
That tells me of a bygone age.
No more does mirth or laughter sound,
Or footsteps through thy halls resound:
Now all is still, all’s bleak decay,
And Ruin wrecks thy fabric grey.

Thy knights and vassals sleep in dust,
Their blades are now consumed by rust;
Vacant thy rooms, upon their walls
The spider weaves its web; for all’s
Now wreck within, without, around.
And solemn silence reigns profound.
Time moulders wall and winding stair
Once trod by knight and lady fair.

Farewell, Rowallan! fare thee well!
Adieu unto thy bosky dell,
Thy ruined keep and shattered tower,
Thy winding stream and leafy bower,
For each memento seems to say
That all on earth must pass away--
That all must change and parted be,
And crumble and decay like thee.

== The tree fox of Rowallan ==
Adamson records that a fox lived in a tree in the old garden at Rowallan. This fox would watch the world go by from its perch and was sufficiently savvy to leave the house keepers chickens alone. One day this fox encountered the local hunt and ran to cover in the tree, to the amazement and consternation of the hunters and hounds. The housekeeper dislodged the poor animal, however it escaped the hunt and was back in its tree the following day as if nothing untoward had happened.

== The marriage tree ==
Near to the castle, overlooking a chasm through which the Carmel runs, stood a stately 'marriage tree' on the bank known as 'Janet's Kirn', Scots for 'churn.' Under this tree Dame Jean Mure of Rowallan was married to William Fairlie of Bruntsfield, an estate near Edinburgh. This wedding was part of a well planned elopement, the suitor having brought a minister with him.

== Rowallan and a visit from Auld Nick ==
The Devil visits Rowallan.

Tis said, one wintry night of yore
were met a happy throng
Within Rowallan's festive hall,
Where all was mirth and song;
When, crashing through the nestling trees,
Auld Nick came in a blue-shot bleeze,
By witch-wife conjured, to affright
For grave abuse or cutting spite.

But little ken'd that sinner warm
That in the castle lay a charm
Which Auld Nick's magic could dispel
And send him baffled hame. Ah! well,
Will he go in? He takes the road.

Avaunt thou, in the name of God!
The parson cried, and then brought down
His Bible whack on Auld Nick's crown.
As when the hunter's well-aimed dart
Strikes through the savage tiger's heart,
Sudden he leaped, and gave a roar
That rent the stair and burst the door,
Then, like a rocket through the night,
In flame of fire passed out of site.

The stair leading up to the principal door of the castle has a crack that is best seen in wet weather, and tradition has it that this was the rent caused by the Devil himself.

== The box hedge ==
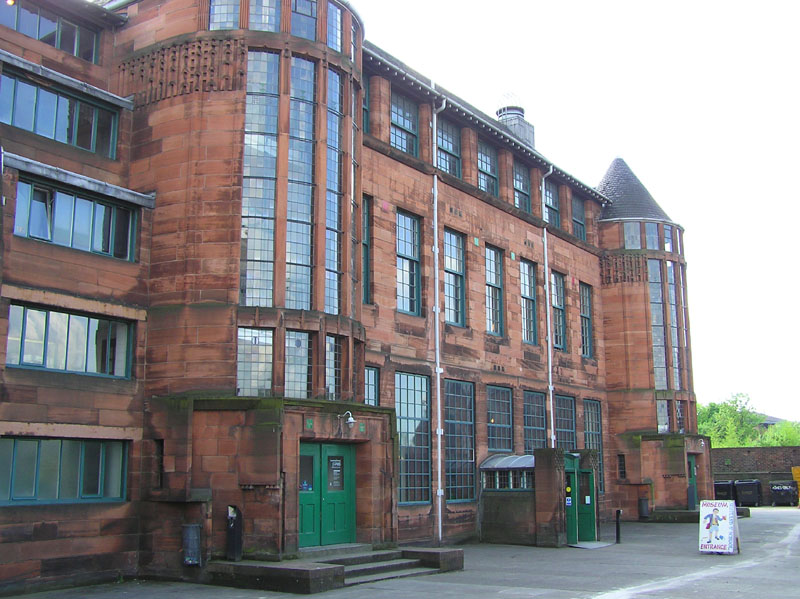
Scotland Street School

A great box hedge was planted at Rowallan castle garden, possibly around 1687, and it was still a magnificent sight circa 1817; by 1847 however it was much decayed.

== The Edwardian castle ==
A second castle on the Rowallan grounds was modernised and the grounds relandscaped from 1902-1906 by the well known architect Sir Robert Lorimer after the estate had been purchased by Archibald Corbett, the property developer and Liberal politician. The original Rowallan Castle of the 16th and 17th century was retained. This castle was placed in the care of Historic Scotland by The 3rd Baron Rowallan. Most recently, as Historic Scotland transitioned to Historic Environment Scotland, the protected status of the original Rowallan Castle changed. "In June 2015, Historic Scotland granted Scheduled Monument Consent (SMC) for the change in use of the castle to be used as guest accommodation." But some protective conditions remain; "These conditions were attached to ensure that the work was carried out to a standard appropriate for a scheduled monument, and to enable Historic Scotland or its successor body (HES) to visit the site and monitor works as they progress. When this change of use has been completed, the site’s designation as a Listed Building, rather than as a Scheduled Monument, will take precedence. Any issues relating to the castle’s conservation will then be a matter for the local authority." The tours provided in the past by historic Scotland are no longer available.

== Charles Rennie Mackintosh ==
Mackintosh is said to have modelled Scotland Street School in Glasgow upon Rowallan Castle and Falkland Palace.

== Dalmusternock ==
Dalmusternock House was built in 1615 by William Mure as a dower house following his marriage to Anna Dundas.

== Micro-history ==
The owner, Niall Campbell and family, had intended that the castle would be used for residential accommodation, but it was retained for some years in the guardianship of Historic Scotland. However, as a result of a controversial decision following protracted legal wrangles, it left Historic Scotland's care as of 2015.

The Hon. Arthur Corbett, as he then was, had his second marriage annulled in 1970 on the grounds that his wife, April Ashley, a transsexual woman, was a man under then-current UK law. The argument was accepted, and the case served as a precedent for all such cases until the Gender Recognition Act 2004 was passed, which provided the needed legal framework for changing a person's legal gender. Corbett later succeeded, in November 1977, as The 3rd Baron Rowallan.

Current owner Niall Campbell had his appeal against conviction in March 2017 in his trial at Kilmarnock Sheriff Court and his fine of £800, for threatening or abusive behaviour, refused by the Sheriff Appeal Court in Edinburgh in September 2017. The Herald newspaper reported (31 March 2017) from the trial that “Campbell gave himself away by leaving his DNA on sticky tape sealing an envelope”.
