= Roger Ormrod =

English judge (1911–1992)

The Right Honourable Sir Roger Ormrod

Lord Justice of Appeal
- In office 1974 – 1982 (retired)

Personal details
- Born: 20 October 1911
- Died: 6 January 1992 (aged 80)
- Spouse: Anne Lush
- Education: The Queen's College, Oxford
- Profession: barrister
- Committees: Lord Chancellor's committee on legal education (chair, 1968)

Military service
- Branch/service: Royal Army Medical Corps
- Years of service: 1942–1945
- Rank: major
- Unit: deputy assistant director of medical services, 8th Corps

Sir Roger Fray Greenwood Ormrod, PC (20 October 1911 – 6 January 1992) was a British Lord Justice of Appeal.

== Biography ==
Ormrod was educated at Shrewsbury School and the Queen's College, Oxford. Although he had studied law at university, his father insisted that he train as a doctor.

After serving in the Royal Army Medical Corps during the Second World War, he returned to legal practice, specialising in divorce cases and becoming Queen's Counsel in 1958. In 1961 he was appointed a judge of the Probate, Divorce and Admiralty Division, and in 1974 a Lord Justice of Appeal. He was a significant figure in the development of the jurisprudence of no-fault divorce in the English courts.

His best known finding came in the divorce case of Corbett v Corbett (1971), in which the wife was a transgender woman. Ormrod held that, for the purpose of marriage, sex was to be legally defined by three factors that he called 'biological' – namely chromosomal, gonadal and genital. Any 'operative intervention' was to be ignored, as were any 'psychological factors' (in that case identified with 'transsexualism'). He said:

Having regard to the essentially heterosexual character of the relationship which is called marriage, the criteria must, in my judgment, be biological, for even the most extreme degree of transsexualism in a male or the most severe hormonal imbalance which can exist in a person with male chromosomes, male gonads and male genitalia cannot reproduce a person who is naturally capable of performing the essential role of a woman in marriage.

On the basis of the medical evidence, Ormrod held that the wife was not a woman for the purposes of marriage but a biological male, and had been so since birth. Accordingly, as the relationship called marriage "is and always has been recognised as the union of man and woman", the marriage was void ab initio.

Ormrod was for many years the chairman of the very successful Notting Hill Housing Trust a charitable housing association then operating mostly in the Royal Borough of Kensington and Chelsea and the London Borough of Hammersmith and Fulham.

== Sources ==
- Obituary in The Times, 9 January 1992.
