= Archibald Corbett, 1st Baron Rowallan =

British politician

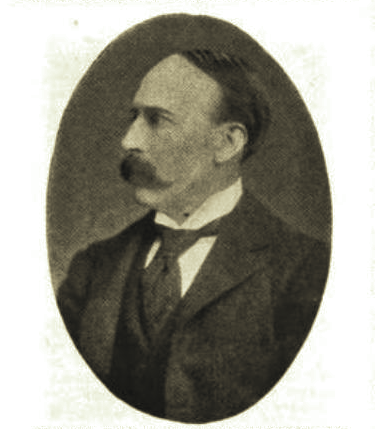
Archibald Cameron Corbett, 1908

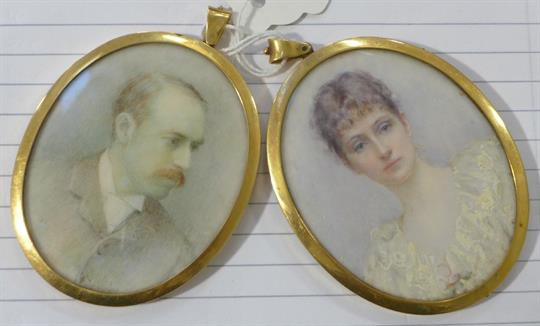
Annie R. Merrylees's pair of oils on ivory of Lord and Lady Rowallan

Archibald Cameron Corbett, 1st Baron Rowallan (23 May 1856 – 19 March 1933), was a Liberal Party Member of Parliament and Liberal Unionist Party politician.

== Early life ==
The second son of Thomas Corbett, a Glasgow merchant and philanthropist, and Sarah (née Cameron), he was educated at home and at the Glasgow Academy. With his older brother Thomas, he took up the offer of a world tour rather than go to university. On his return, he briefly studied sculpture in South Kensington and then managed his father's estates in Essex which he bought from his uncle after his father's death in 1880. He became one of the principal developers of the eastern suburbs of London.

== Political career ==
An interest in philanthropy led him into politics and first contested North Warwickshire in 1884 at the age of 28. At the 1885 general election he was elected as Member of Parliament (MP) for Glasgow Tradeston, first as a Liberal and from 1886 as a Liberal Unionist. In August 1908, he crossed the floor of the House and rejoined the Liberal Party. In the same year, he served as president of the Scottish Permissive Bill and Temperance Association. He held Glasgow Tradeston until his retirement from the House of Commons in 1911, when he was created 1st Baron Rowallan, of Rowallan in the County of Ayr.

== Family life ==
In 1887, he married Alice Mary Polson, a daughter of John Polson, the co-founder of the corn merchants firm of Brown & Polson. They had a daughter, Elsie Cameron, and two sons; Thomas Godfrey Polson and Arthur Cameron who joined the Royal Naval Air Service (RNAS) and was killed in 1916. During the First World War, Elsie was a VAD, and served as an ambulance driver with the Scottish Women's Hospital for Foreign Service. She was taken into captivity in 1915 while in the Kingdom of Serbia. As well as the War and Victory medals, she was awarded the Serbian Gold Medal for Devoted Service. Her photograph appears on the front page of the Daily Record of 25 December 1915, noting that she was still in Serbia.

In 1901, the Corbetts bought the 6,000 acre Rowallan Estate in Ayrshire. Their previous Scottish home at Rouken Glen was donated to the citizens of Glasgow as a public park. In 1906, he donated the Ardgoil Estate to Glasgow as well. Lord Rowallan died on 19 March 1933 aged 76 and was succeeded by his son.

== Arms ==
Coat of arms of Archibald Corbett, 1st Baron Rowallan
Crest A branch of oak thereon a raven Sable. Escutcheon Quarterly 1st & 4th Argent a key fesseways wards downwards between two ravens Sable (Corbett) 2nd & 3rd Azure a chevron Or between two bears' heads couped Argent muzzled Gules in chief and in base a cross moline of the third (Polson). Supporters Dexter a salmon Proper holding in its mouth a jewelled ring Or, Sinister a seal Proper. Motto Deus Pascit Corvos

Parliament of the United Kingdom
New constituency	Member of Parliament for Glasgow Tradeston; 1885–1911	Succeeded by J. D. White
Peerage of the United Kingdom
New constituency	Baron Rowallan; 1911–1933	Succeeded by Thomas Corbett
