= J. D. White =

British politician (1866–1951)

James Dundas White (10 July 1866 – 30 April 1951), known as J. D. White, was a Scottish Liberal Party politician. He was Member of Parliament (MP) from 1906 to 1918, with a short break in 1911.

== Background ==
White was the nephew of Lord Overtoun. Born in Rutherglen, his family operated the J&J White Chemicals factory in the town. He was educated at Rugby School and Trinity College, Cambridge, and was called to the bar at the Inner Temple in 1891.

== Politics ==
He was elected at the 1906 general election as Liberal MP for Dunbartonshire.

General election 1906: Dunbartonshire Electorate
Party	Candidate	Votes	%	±%
Liberal	J. D. White	7,404		
Conservative	Henry Brock	6,937		
Majority				
Turnout				
Liberal gain from Conservative		Swing		

He was re-elected in January 1910.

General election January 1910: Dunbartonshire Electorate
Party	Candidate	Votes	%	±%
Liberal	J. D. White	8,640		
Conservative	Henry Brock	7,607		
Majority				
Turnout				
Liberal hold		Swing		

In 1910 he was appointed Parliamentary Private Secretary to Lord Pentland the Secretary of State for Scotland. He did not stand at the December 1910 general election. He returned to the House of Commons seven months later, when he was elected at the 1911 Glasgow Tradeston by-election.

1911 Glasgow Tradeston by-election Electorate
Party	Candidate	Votes	%	±%
Liberal	J. D. White	3,869		
Conservative	John Henry Watts	1,086		
Majority		2,783		
Turnout				
Liberal hold		Swing		

He was one of a group of radical Liberal MPs called the Single Taxers, who favoured land reform. They had some success in persuading Liberal Chancellor of the Exchequer David Lloyd George who integrated some of their views into his 1913-14 land campaign. White favoured the introduction of Land value taxation and wrote extensively on the subject. In 1912 when Thomas McKinnon Wood took over as Secretary of State for Scotland, White continued as his PPS. He remained as PPS to McKinnon Wood in his other roles until he left office in 1916. He was Chairman of one and member of several other Departmental Committees during the European War. At the general election in 1918, White did not receive the Coalition Coupon and was defeated by a Unionist supporter of Lloyd George's coalition government.

General election 14 December 1918: Glasgow Tradeston Electorate 35,960
Party	Candidate	Votes	%	±%
Unionist	Vivian Henderson	12,250		
British Socialist Party	James Dunlop McDougall	3,751		n/a
Liberal	J. D. White	3,369		
Majority		8,499		
Turnout				
Unionist gain from Liberal		Swing	n/a	

In 1919 along with a number of other Single Taxers, he left the Liberal Party and joined the Independent Labour Party. He did not contest the 1922 General election. At the 1923 General Election he contested Middlesbrough West.

General election 1923: Middlesbrough West Electorate 35,362
Party	Candidate	Votes	%	±%
Liberal	Trevelyan Thomson	16,837	69.4	
Labour	J. D. White	7,413	30.6	
Majority		9,424	38.8	
Turnout			68.6	
Liberal hold		Swing		

At the 1924 General Election he contested Glasgow Central.

General election 1924: Glasgow Central Electorate 44,010
Party	Candidate	Votes	%	±%
Unionist	William Alexander	18,258	59.1	
Labour	J. D. White	12,617	40.9	
Majority		5,641	18.2	
Turnout			70.2	
Unionist hold		Swing		

In 1926 he became disillusioned with the failure of the Labour Party to commit to land reform and resigned as a member. He did not contested any further parliamentary elections.

Parliament of the United Kingdom
Preceded by Alexander Wylie	Member of Parliament for Dunbartonshire; 1906 – December 1910	Succeeded by Arthur Acland Allen
Preceded by Archibald Corbett	Member of Parliament for Glasgow Tradeston; 1911 – 1918	Succeeded by Vivian Henderson
