= William McLean (civil servant) =

British town planner and politician (1877–1967)

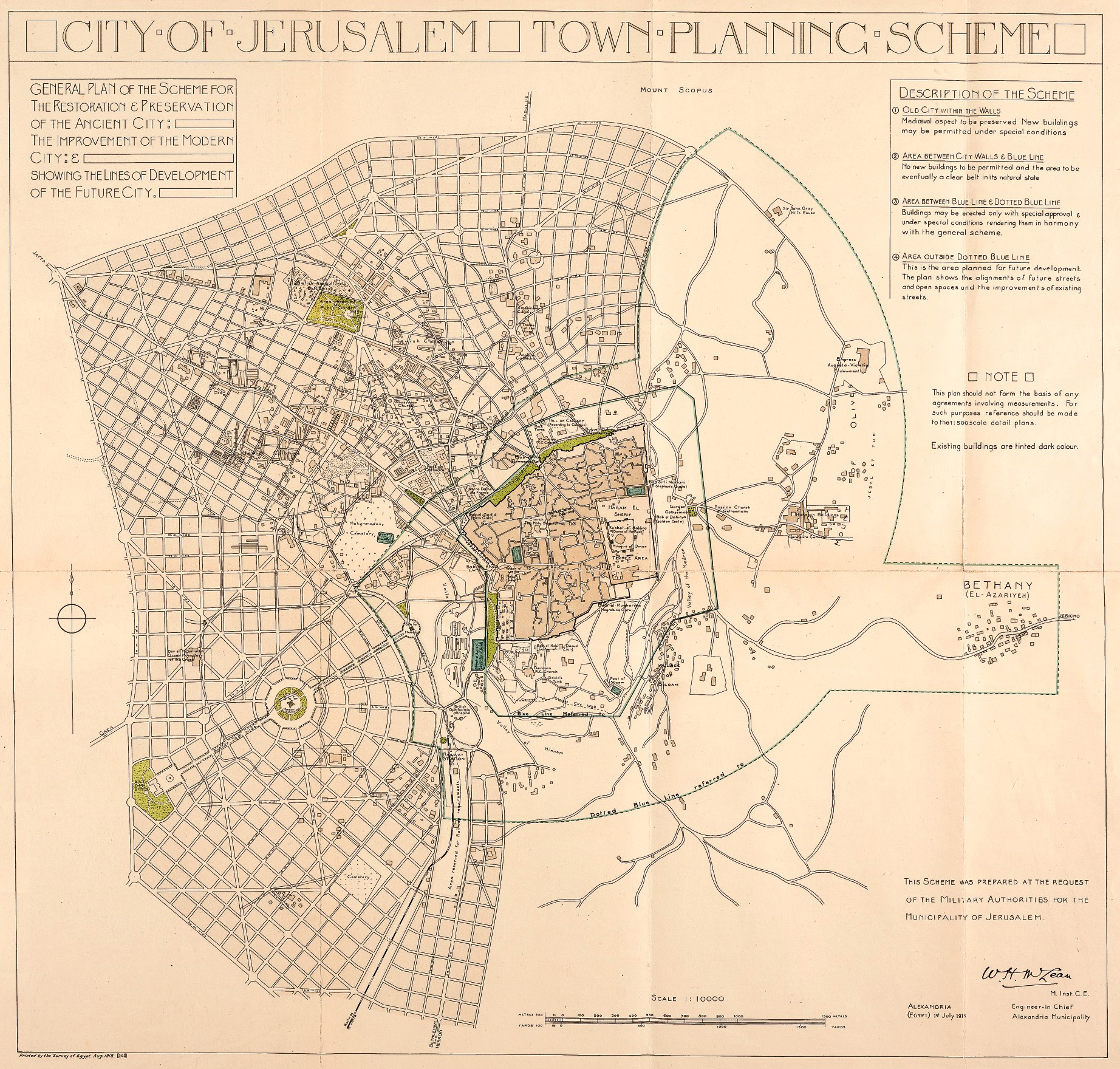
McLean's 1918 Town Plan of Jerusalem, which was the first urban planning scheme for the city. It laid the foundations for what became West Jerusalem and East Jerusalem.

Sir William Hannah McLean, KBE (1877–1967), was a British engineer, colonial development specialist, colonial administrator, and politician.

== Biography ==
Educated privately and at Glasgow University, McLean trained as a civil engineer, then joined the Sudan Civil Service in 1906, where he came into contact with Lord Kitchener over the planning of Khartoum, for whose layout he was responsible. At the request of Kitchener, he transferred to the Egyptian Civil Service in 1913 and became Engineer-in-Chief, Ministry of Interior, where he planned Alexandria and initiated the national and regional development planning scheme for Egypt. During the First World War, he was in charge of the protection of town water supplies in Egypt.

In 1918, he prepared a protective urban planning scheme for Jerusalem, which was approved by Lord Allenby. He divided Jerusalem into four zones:

1. the Old City, in which a ‘‘medieval aspect’’ was to be preserved through the prohibition of all new construction;
2. a zone of non-construction around the Old City, where undesirable buildings would be cleared and the area left to its natural state;
3. an area to the north and east of the Old City, where buildings could be erected only with special approval; and
4. an area to the north and west of the Old City that was set aside for modern development.

He retired from the Egyptian Civil Service in 1926 and returned to Glasgow University, where he engaged in technical and economic research in regional planning, for which he was awarded a PhD in 1929.

He was a Scottish Unionist Party member of the House of Commons of the United Kingdom for Glasgow Tradeston between the general elections of 1931 and 1935. In 1938, he was appointed Commander of the Venerable Order of the Hospital of St. John of Jerusalem.

He was a member of the advisory committee on education in the colonies and of the educational commission to East Africa of 1937. He was appointed KBE in 1938. From 1931 onward, he dedicated much of his effort to the spreading of information about British colonial policy. During the Second World War, he worked on a voluntary and unpaid basis for the Information Department of the Colonial Office, producing factual memoranda about colonial administration and development for the information of parliamentarians.

== See also ==
- Urban planning in Israel

Parliament of the United Kingdom
Preceded by Tom Henderson	Member of Parliament for Glasgow Tradeston; 1931 – 1935	Succeeded by Tom Henderson
