= Corbett v Corbett =

1970 English transsexual marriage case

Corbett v. Corbett
- Court: Probate, Divorce and Admiralty Division of the High Court of Justice
- Full case name: Arthur Cameron Corbett v. April Corbett (Otherwise Ashley)
- Decided: 2 February 1970
- Citation: [1971] P. 83, [1970] 2 All E.R. 33

Court membership
- Judge sitting: Roger Ormrod

Case opinions
- Decision by: Ormrod

Corbett v Corbett (otherwise Ashley) is a 1970 family law divorce case heard between November and December 1969 by the High Court of England and Wales in which Arthur Corbett sought annulment of his marriage to April Ashley. Corbett had known at the time of the wedding that Ashley had been registered at birth "as of the male sex", and had undergone what at the time was referred to as a "sex-change operation". However, after the relationship had broken down Corbett sought to end the marriage, with the grounds for divorce being that as Ashley was "a person of the male sex" the marriage was invalid. Same-sex marriage in the United Kingdom was illegal at the time.

The court held that, for the purposes of marriage, sex was to be legally defined by three factors present at birth that the judge referred to as "biological" – namely chromosomal, gonadal and genital. Any surgery or medical intervention was to be ignored, as were any psychological factors (which were in this case identified with Ashley's "transsexualism"). The judge held that the marriage (which had to be between man and woman) should be annulled. Although the judgment was restricted to a consideration of legal sex specifically within marriage, its reasoning was later applied more widely within England and Wales.

== Background ==
The parties to the case were The Hon. Arthur Corbett, (future 3rd Baron Rowallan), a British aristocrat (the husband), and April Ashley, a model and actress (the wife). Ashley had been registered male at birth in 1935 and had been raised as a boy, but by 1956 was working as what at that time was known as a "female impersonator" in the South of France. In 1960 Ashley underwent sex re-assignment surgery in Casablanca, and became a successful model, photographed by David Bailey for British Vogue.

Corbett and Ashley had met in 1960 and married in September 1963, Corbett doing so with full knowledge of Ashley's history and of the surgery. Within 14 days the relationship had broken down. Ashley's lawyers wrote to Corbett in 1966 demanding maintenance payments, and in 1967 he responded by filing suit to have the marriage annulled. As the case was brought prior to the Matrimonial Causes Act 1973 (which would have allowed divorce after a period of marital separation), other grounds had to be relied upon. Corbett argued that the marriage was null and void on the basis that Ashley had at the time of the ceremony been a person of the male sex; or alternatively that the marriage had never been consummated sexually.

== Legal case ==
Lord Justice Ormrod, sitting in the Probate, Divorce, and Admiralty Division of the High Court of Justice, heard from a wide range of doctors, with each side calling three leading medical experts to give evidence. The judge noted: "there was a very large measure of agreement between [the experts] on the present state of scientific knowledge on all relevant topics, although they differed in the inferences and conclusions which they drew from the application of this knowledge to the facts of the present case."

All of the medical experts agreed that there were at least four medical criteria to be used in assessing the sex of an individual, namely:

- Chromosomal factors
- Gonadal factors (i.e. presence or absence of testes or ovaries)
- Genital factors (including internal sex organs)
- Psychological factors

Some of the expert witnesses also included hormonal factors or secondary sexual characteristics.

The judge noted that the medical criteria did not necessarily decide the legal basis of sex determination, but that they were "of course, relevant". John Randell, who had set up the first transgender clinic at Charing Cross Hospital, stated that Ashley was "properly classified as a male homosexual transsexualist", while other witnesses preferred the description "castrated male".

The judge held that for the purposes of marriage, sex was to be legally defined by only the first three factors listed above, which he called "biological" – namely chromosomal, gonadal and genital. Any "operative intervention" was to be ignored, as were any "psychological factors" (in this case identified with "transsexualism"). He explained:

It is common ground between all the medical witnesses that the biological sexual constitution of an individual is fixed at birth (at the latest), and cannot be changed, either by the natural development of organs of the opposite sex, or by medical or surgical means. The respondent's operation, therefore, cannot affect her true sex. The only cases where the term "change of sex" is appropriate are those in which a mistake as to sex is made at birth and subsequently revealed by further medical investigation.

Having regard to the essentially heterosexual character of the relationship which is called marriage, the criteria must, in my judgment, be biological, for even the most extreme degree of transsexualism in a male or the most severe hormonal imbalance which can exist in a person with male chromosomes, male gonads and male genitalia cannot reproduce a person who is naturally capable of performing the essential role of a woman in marriage.

After hearing the medical evidence, the judge held that Ashley was not a woman for the purposes of marriage but a biological male, and had been so since birth. On that basis, as "marriage is and always has been recognised as the union of man and woman", the marriage was held to be void ab initio.

The court was careful to limit the scope of the judgment to the determination of legal sex for the purpose of marriage. It was not, the judge said, his purpose to determine "legal sex" for other purposes; indeed, Ashley had already been accepted as a woman for the purposes of her National Insurance contributions.

== After the ruling ==
The ruling in this case was used as the basis to define the legal sex of transsexual and transgender people for many purposes until the introduction of the Sex Discrimination (Gender Reassignment) Regulations 1999, in an amendment to the Sex Discrimination Act 1975. These Regulations defined "gender reassignment" as "a process which is undertaken under medical supervision for the purpose of reassigning a person's sex by changing physiological or other characteristics of sex". In the Equality Act 2010 the requirement for medical supervision as a condition for legal recognition of a change of sex was removed.

As a result of the decision in this case, alternative ways to achieve amendment of birth records for transsexual and intersex people ceased in England and Wales until the introduction of the Gender Recognition Act 2004.

== Relationship to other cases ==
The decision of the Corbett v Corbett case runs counter to an earlier case, that of Sir Ewan Forbes in 1968. However, that case was not available at the time for consideration as a precedent. Academic and LGBTQI+ advocate Zoë Playdon suggests that the decision in the Forbes case shows "there is apparently no reason why the benefits its precedent provides – a corrected birth certificate and equal civil status – should not be enjoyed by everyone else in the UK who like him has been born with the condition of transsexualism." The Forbes case is the subject of Playdon's 2021 book The Hidden Case of Ewan Forbes.

== See also ==
- Transgender rights in the United Kingdom
- Intersex rights in the United Kingdom

== Bibliography ==
- Fallowell, Duncan & April Ashley (1982). April Ashley's Odyssey. London: Jonathan Cape. ISBN 9780224018494.
- Finley, Henry (1989). "Transsexuals, Sex Change Operations and the Chromosome Test: Corbett v. Corbett Not Followed". UWA Law Review. 19: 152–157.
- Fishbayn, Lisa (2007). "Not Quite One Gender or the Other": Marriage Law and the Containment of Gender Trouble in the United Kingdom". American University Journal of Gender, Social Policy & the Law. 15 (3): 413–441.
- Gilmore, Stephen, "Corbett v. Corbett (Otherwise Ashley), [1971] P. 83, Corbett v. Corbett: Once a Man, Always a Man?", in Herring, Jonathan, Rebecca Probert & Stephen Gilmore (editors), Landmark Cases in Family Law, 2011, ISBN 9781847317872
- Hutton, Christopher (2019). The Tyranny of Ordinary Meaning: Corbett v. Corbett and the Invention of Legal Sex. Cham, Switzerland: Palgrave Macmillan. ISBN 9783030202705.
- Probert, Rebecca (2005). "How would Corbett v Corbett be decided today?". Family Law. 52: 382–385.
- Stirnitzke, Audrey C. (2011). "Transsexuality, Marriage, and the Myth of True Sex" (PDF). Arizona Law Review. 53: 285–319.
