= Glasgow Tradeston =

Parliamentary constituency in the United Kingdom, 1885–1955

- Former burgh constituency for the House of Commons
- Glasgow Camlachie shown within Glasgow and Lanarkshire and Glasgow and Lanarkshire shown within Scotland
- Subdivision: City and royal burgh of Glasgow; County of city of Glasgow

1885–1955
- Seats: 1
- Created from: Glasgow
- Replaced by: Glasgow Govan

Glasgow Tradeston was a burgh constituency represented in the House of Commons of the Parliament of the United Kingdom from 1885 until 1955. It elected one Member of Parliament (MP) using the first-past-the-post voting system.

== Boundaries ==
The Redistribution of Seats Act 1885 provided that the constituency was to consist of the fifteenth and sixteenth Municipal Wards.

In 1918 the constituency consisted of "That portion of the city which is bounded by a line commencing at a point on the centre of Glasgow Bridge at the centre line of the River Clyde, thence southward along the centre line of Glasgow Bridge, Bridge Street and Eglinton Street to the centre line of the Glasgow and South Western Railway at Eglinton Street Station, thence westward along the centre line of the Glasgow and South Western Railway (Paisley Canal Line) to the centre line of Shields Road, thence northwards along the centre line of Shields Road to the centre line of the Caledonian Railway, thence westward along the centre line of the said Caledonian Railway and the Glasgow and Paisley Joint Railway to a point in line with the centre line of Church Road, thence northward along the centre line of Church Road, Whitefield Road, and the portion of Govan Road to the west of Princes Dock and continuation thereof to the centre line of the River Clyde, thence eastward along the centre line of the River Clyde to the point of commencement."

1918–1949: The County of the City of Glasgow wards of Kingston and Kinning Park

1950–1955: The County of the City of Glasgow wards of Kinning Park and Kingston, and part of Govan

== Members of Parliament ==
Election	Member	Party
1885	Archibald Cameron Corbett, later Baron Rowallan	Liberal
1886	Archibald Cameron Corbett, later Baron Rowallan	Liberal Unionist
January 1910	Archibald Cameron Corbett, later Baron Rowallan	Independent Liberal
December 1910	Archibald Cameron Corbett, later Baron Rowallan	Liberal
1911	James Dundas White	Liberal
1918	Vivian Leonard Henderson	Unionist
1922	Thomas Henderson	Labour Co-operative
1931	William Hannah McLean	Unionist
1935	Thomas Henderson	Labour Co-operative
1945	John Rankin	Labour Co-operative
1955	constituency abolished	

== Elections ==
=== Elections in the 1880s ===
General election 1885: Glasgow Tradeston
Party	Candidate	Votes	%	±%
Liberal	Archibald Corbett	4,354	56.69	
Conservative	James Somervell	3,240	42.19	
Scottish Land Restoration	Wallace McGuffin Greaves	86	1.12	
Majority		1,114	14.50	
Turnout		7,680	83.28	
Registered electors		9,222		
Liberal win (new seat)				

General election 1886: Glasgow Tradeston
Party	Candidate	Votes	%	±%
Liberal Unionist	Archibald Corbett	3,878	54.99	−1.70
Liberal	John Meiklejohn	3,174	45.01	−11.68
Majority		704	9.98	N/A
Turnout		7,052	76.47	−6.81
Registered electors		9,222		
Liberal Unionist gain from Liberal		Swing		

=== Elections in the 1890s ===
Caldwell

General election 1892: Glasgow Tradeston
Party	Candidate	Votes	%	±%
Liberal Unionist	Archibald Corbett	3,366	45.82	−9.17
Liberal	James Caldwell	3,197	43.52	−1.49
Scottish Labour	Bennet Burley	783	10.66	New
Majority		169	2.30	−7.68
Turnout		7,346	76.00	−0.47
Registered electors		9,666		
Liberal Unionist hold		Swing	−9.17	

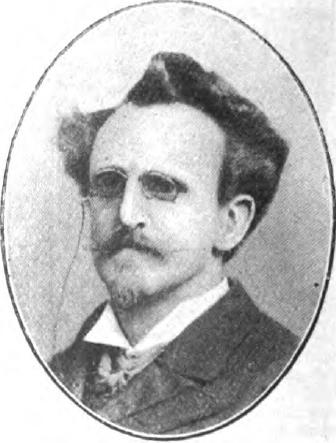
Smith

General election 1895: Glasgow Tradeston
Party	Candidate	Votes	%	±%
Liberal Unionist	Archibald Corbett	3,373	53.46	+7.64
Liberal	George Green	2,568	40.70	−2.82
Ind. Labour Party	Frank Smith	368	5.83	−4.83
Majority		805	12.76	+10.46
Turnout		6,309	62.02	−13.98
Registered electors		10,173		
Liberal Unionist hold		Swing	+5.23	

=== Elections in the 1900s ===
General election 1900: Glasgow Tradeston
Party	Candidate	Votes	%	±%
Liberal Unionist	Archibald Corbett	4,389	61.17	+7.71
Lib-Lab	William Maxwell	2,785	38.82	−1.88
Majority		1,604	22.36	+9.60
Turnout		7,174	74.18	+12.16
Registered electors		9,671		
Liberal Unionist hold		Swing	+4.80	

General election 1906: Glasgow Tradeston
Party	Candidate	Votes	%	±%
Liberal Unionist	Archibald Corbett	4,416	50.62	−10.55
Liberal	David Marshall Mason	4,063	46.57	+7.75
Ind. Conservative	Abraham Rosenthal	245	2.81	New
Majority		353	4.05	−18.31
Turnout		8,724	83.49	+9.31
Registered electors		10,449		
Liberal Unionist hold		Swing	−9.15	

- Stood as a 'Fiscal Reform' candidate

=== Elections in the 1910s ===
Mason

General election January 1910: Glasgow Tradeston
Party	Candidate	Votes	%	±%
Independent Liberal	Archibald Corbett	2,966	35.26	−15.36
Liberal Unionist	Archibald Pollock Main	2,773	32.96	−17.66
Liberal	David Marshall Mason	2,673	31.78	−14.79
Majority		193	2.29	N/A
Turnout		8,412	87.04	+3.55
Registered electors		9,664		
Independent Liberal gain from Liberal Unionist		Swing		

General election December 1910: Glasgow Tradeston
Party	Candidate	Votes	%	±%
Liberal	Archibald Corbett	4,811	60.53	+28.75
Liberal Unionist	Archibald Pollock Main	3,137	39.47	+6.51
Majority		1,674	21.06	N/A
Turnout		7,948	82.71	−4.33
Registered electors		9,609		
Liberal gain from Independent Liberal		Swing		

1911 Glasgow Tradeston by-election
Party	Candidate	Votes	%	±%
Liberal	J. D. White	3,869	58.16	−2.37
Liberal Unionist	John Henry Watts	2,783	41.84	+2.37
Majority		1,086	16.32	−4.74
Turnout		6,652	69.23	−13.48
Registered electors		9,609		
Liberal hold		Swing	−2.37	

General election 1918: Glasgow Tradeston
Party		Candidate	Votes	%	±%
C	Unionist	Vivian Henderson	12,250	63.2	+23.7
	British Socialist Party	James MacDougall	3,751	19.4	New
	Liberal	J. D. White	3,369	17.4	−43.1
Majority			8,499	43.8	N/A
Turnout			19,370	53.9	−28.8
Registered electors			35,960		
	Unionist gain from Liberal		Swing	+33.4	
C indicates candidate endorsed by the coalition government.

=== Elections in the 1920s ===
General election 1922: Glasgow Tradeston
Party	Candidate	Votes	%	±%
Labour Co-op	Thomas Henderson	14,190	55.7	New
Unionist	Vivian Henderson	9,977	39.2	−24.0
Liberal	Charles de Bois Murray	1,310	5.1	−12.3
Majority		4,213	16.5	N/A
Turnout		25,477	75.4	+21.5
Registered electors		33,792		
Labour Co-op gain from Unionist		Swing		

General election 1923: Glasgow Tradeston
Party	Candidate	Votes	%	±%
Labour Co-op	Thomas Henderson	12,787	60.1	+4.4
Liberal	Douglas Macdonald	8,479	39.9	+34.8
Majority		4,308	20.2	+3.7
Turnout		21,266	63.1	−12.3
Registered electors		33,713		
Labour Co-op hold		Swing	−15.2	

General election 1924: Glasgow Tradeston
Party	Candidate	Votes	%	±%
Labour Co-op	Thomas Henderson	14,067	56.0	−4.1
Liberal	Douglas Macdonald	11,074	44.0	+4.1
Majority		2,993	12.0	−8.2
Turnout		25,141	73.1	+10.0
Registered electors		34,373		
Labour Co-op hold		Swing	−4.1	

General election 1929: Glasgow Tradeston
Party	Candidate	Votes	%	±%
Labour Co-op	Thomas Henderson	17,864	57.9	+1.9
Unionist	Ingram Spencer	12,992	42.1	New
Majority		4,872	15.8	+3.8
Turnout		30,456	75.7	+2.6
Registered electors		40,743		
Labour Co-op hold		Swing		

=== Elections in the 1930s ===
General election 1931: Glasgow Tradeston
Party	Candidate	Votes	%	±%
Unionist	William McLean	15,067	52.60	+10.50
Labour Co-op	Thomas Henderson	13,579	47.40	−10.50
Majority		1,488	5.20	N/A
Turnout		28,646	73.40	−2.30
Registered electors		39,026		
Unionist gain from Labour Co-op		Swing	+11.26	

General election 1935: Glasgow Tradeston
Party	Candidate	Votes	%	±%
Labour Co-op	Thomas Henderson	12,253	47.07	−0.33
Unionist	William McLean	10,354	39.78	−12.82
Ind. Labour Party	James Carmichael	3,423	13.15	N/A
Majority		1,899	7.29	N/A
Turnout		26,030	69.26	−3.14
Registered electors		37,582		
Labour Co-op gain from Unionist		Swing	−0.33	

General Election 1939–40

Another General Election was required to take place before the end of 1940. The political parties had been making preparations for an election to take place and by the Autumn of 1939, the following candidates had been selected;

- Labour: Thomas Henderson
- Unionist:

=== Elections in the 1940s ===
General election 1945: Glasgow Tradeston
Party	Candidate	Votes	%	±%
Labour Co-op	John Rankin	13,153	59.72	+12.65
Unionist	H Black	8,871	40.28	+0.50
Majority		4,282	19.44	+12.15
Turnout		22,023	62.19	−7.07
Registered electors		35,412		
Labour hold		Swing	+12.65	

=== Elections in the 1950s ===
General election 1950: Glasgow Tradeston
Party	Candidate	Votes	%	±%
Labour Co-op	John Rankin	26,598	62.88	+3.16
Unionist	Alexander Hart	15,074	37.12	−3.16
Majority		10,894	25.76	+6.32
Turnout		41,672	78.75	+16.56
Registered electors		53,719		
Labour Co-op hold		Swing	+3.16	

General election 1951: Glasgow Tradeston
Party	Candidate	Votes	%	±%
Labour Co-op	John Rankin	26,966	63.10	+0.22
Unionist	Alexander Hart	15,771	36.90	−0.22
Majority		11,195	26.20	+0.45
Turnout		42,737	80.03	+1.28
Registered electors		53,404		
Labour Co-op hold		Swing	+0.22	
