= Vivian Henderson =

British politician

Lieutenant-Colonel Sir Vivian Leonard Henderson MC (6 October 1884 – 3 February 1965) was a British army officer and Conservative Party politician who was elected to the House of Commons three times, for three different constituencies.

Henderson was born in Liverpool, and following education at Uppingham School and the Royal Military College Sandhurst, was commissioned as an officer in the Loyal North Lancashire Regiment in 1904. He served with the regiment in the First World War. During the First Battle of Ypres in October 1914 his bravery at Bixschotte led to the award of the Military Cross. After the war he was appointed Lieutenant-Colonel commanding the 3rd (Reserve) Battalion of the Loyals in the Supplementary Reserve (SR) on 15 October 1921, and retained the position until World War II, even though the SR was in abeyance.

Following the war, he was elected at the 1918 general election as Member of Parliament for Glasgow Tradeston. He stood as a Coalition Conservative, and having received the "coalition coupon", he took the seat with a huge majority over the sitting Liberal Party MP, James Dundas White, who was pushed into third place behind a candidate of the British Socialist Party. In 1921 he was appointed a member of the Royal Commission on Fire Prevention.

At the 1922 general election, Henderson lost his seat by a wide margin to the Labour Co-operative candidate Tom Henderson (unrelated). Henderson did not stand again in Glasgow, but fought the 1923 general election in the Liberal-held Bootle constituency on Merseyside. He did not win the seat, but cut the Liberal majority to only 453 votes, and at the 1924 general election he took the seat by a comfortable margin of 2,934 votes. He was knighted in the 1927 Birthday Honours, and was appointed in November of that year to the junior ranks of the Conservative Government, as Under-Secretary of State for the Home Department. However, at the 1929 general election, when the Labour Party took power for the second time, Henderson's seat in Bootle was one of Labour's gains.

He was returned to Parliament at the 1931 general election for Chelmsford, which had been a safe Conservative seat since the collapse of the Liberals in the early 1920s. In 1934 his health deteriorated, and he stepped down at the 1935 general election.

On his retirement from the Commons, he was offered the post of Governor of Burma, but declined on medical advice.

He did, however, continue his involvement in public affairs, and was appointed a deputy lieutenant and justice of the peace for the County of London, serving as chairman of the Hampstead and Lambeth Juvenile Courts.

== Family ==
He married Eileen Marjorie Dowell, daughter of Brigadier-General G W Dowell in 1913, and they had three daughters. He died at his London home in February 1965, aged 80.

Parliament of the United Kingdom
Preceded by J. D. White	Member of Parliament for Glasgow Tradeston; 1918 – 1922	Succeeded by Tom Henderson
Preceded by James Burnie	Member of Parliament for Bootle; 1924 – 1929	Succeeded by Jack Kinley
Preceded by Charles Howard-Bury	Member of Parliament for Chelmsford; 1931 – 1935	Succeeded by John Macnamara
Political offices
Preceded by Douglas Hacking	Under-Secretary of State for the Home Department; 1927–1929	Succeeded by Alfred Short
