= Thomas Corbett, 2nd Baron Rowallan =

Lieutenant Colonel The Right Honourable The Lord Rowallan KT KBE MC TD

18th Governor of Tasmania
- In office 21 October 1959 – 25 March 1963
- Monarch: Elizabeth II
- Premier: Eric Reece (1959–63)
- Preceded by: Sir Ronald Cross
- Succeeded by: Sir Charles Gairdner

Member of the House of Lords
- In office 19 March 1933 – 30 November 1977; Hereditary Peerage
- Preceded by: Archibald Corbett
- Succeeded by: Arthur Corbett

Personal details
- Born: 19 December 1895 Chelsea, London
- Died: 30 November 1977 (aged 81) Rowallan Castle, Kilmarnock
- Spouse: Gwyn Mervyn Grimond
- Children: Arthur Corbett, 3rd Baron Rowallan
- Parent(s): Archibald Corbett, 1st Baron Rowallan; Alice Mary Polson
- Civilian awards: Knight of the Order of the Thistle; Knight Commander of the Order of the British Empire

Military service
- Allegiance: United Kingdom
- Branch/service: British Army
- Years of service: 1914–1918; 1939–1944
- Rank: Lieutenant Colonel
- Battles/wars: First World War: Gallipoli Campaign; Sinai and Palestine Campaign; Second Battle of Gaza; Western Front; Operation Michael; Second World War: Battle of France; Operation Aerial
- Military awards: Military Cross; Territorial Decoration

Thomas Godfrey Polson Corbett, 2nd Baron Rowallan, KT, KBE, MC, TD (19 December 1895 – 30 November 1977), had a distinguished military career in the British Army and was Governor of Tasmania from 1959 to 1963. The Boy Scouts Association appointed him as its Chief Scout of the British Commonwealth and Empire from 1945 to 1959.

== Family life and death ==
The first son of Archibald Corbett, the Liberal politician and property developer, and Alice Mary, the daughter of John Polson, a corn merchant, Thomas Corbett was born in Chelsea, London, on 19 December 1895 and was brought up in London and on the family's Scottish estates. Known as "Billy" to the family, he was educated at Gibbs School in Sloane Street, London, Wellington House Preparatory School in Westgate-on-Sea and Eton College. His mother died of sepsis, in 1902. His elder sister, Elsie Cameron Corbett, became a volunteer ambulance driver in Serbia during the First World War and was awarded British and Serbian medals. His younger brother, Arthur Cameron Corbett, died in military service.

Corbett married Gwyn Mervyn Grimond on 14 August 1918. She was the daughter of Joseph Bowman Grimond of St Andrews, Fife, and sister of Jo Grimond, later Baron Grimond, leader of the Liberal Party 1956–67. He had met her while on leave from war service; they had five sons and a daughter. On leaving the British Army, he became a successful breeder of pedigree dairy cattle on the family estate in Ayrshire and campaigned for the eradication of bovine tuberculosis. He succeeded as The 2nd Baron Rowallan on 19 March 1933.

In 1961, Lord Rowallan was diagnosed as suffering from cancer of the palate, for which he took leave as Governor of Tasmania and was treated in London. He retired in 1963 to his family estate in Scotland. He completed his autobiography, "Rowallan", in his eightieth year. Lord Rowallan died at Rowallan Castle, near Kilmarnock, on 30 November 1977. He was survived by his daughter and four of his five sons; his other son, John, had been killed in action in 1944.

== Military career ==
=== First World War ===
Corbett was 18 when the First World War broke out; he secured a Commission in the Ayrshire Yeomanry and went with them to Gallipoli in October 1915. The Ayrshires were amongst the last troops to be evacuated and went from there to Egypt, forming part of the cavalry reserve in the Second Battle of Gaza. He then transferred to the Grenadier Guards; after re-training he was sent to the Western Front in March 1918, joining the 1st Battalion at Mercatel as a lieutenant. This coincided with the German Spring Offensive (Operation Michael), and the battalion was soon in action. At Boyelles on 30 March 1918, Corbett attempted to dig out some wounded soldiers who had been buried by artillery, while "under heavy fire and in full view of the enemy" and was awarded the Military Cross but received a leg wound which left him with a permanent disability.

=== Second World War ===
Between the wars, Corbett served as Adjutant of the Ayrshire Yeomanry. In 1939, Corbett raised a new Territorial Army battalion of the Royal Scots Fusiliers whom he accompanied to France as part of the British Expeditionary Force in 1939. Evacuated from Cherbourg during Operation Aerial, he was then given command of a Young Soldiers’ Battalion in the Scottish Highlands; the adventurous training he initiated was based in part on his long association with the Scout Movement. His success earned him the position of Commandant at the new Highland Fieldcraft Training Centre in Glenfeshie and Poolewe, which had been established to provide leadership experience to junior officers. A measure of his influence is that a "Rowallan Company" was formed at Royal Military Academy Sandhurst in 1977 using his methods to improve the performance of Officer Cadets.

== National Bank of Scotland ==
Rowallan was a Governor of the National Bank of Scotland from 1947 until 1953.

== Governor of Tasmania ==
Lord Rowallan became Governor of Tasmania on 21 October 1959, despite the Labor Party having resolved that the next Governor of Tasmania should be an Australian. He did much to promote Tasmania and to protect its interests and sovereignty. Rowallan Power Station and its associated dam and lake are named after him. In his spare time, he built up a herd of Jersey cattle at Government House and sailed a yacht which he later gave to the local Sea Scouts. Following his illness and leave in 1961, his term of office ended on 25 March 1963.

== Boy Scouts Association ==
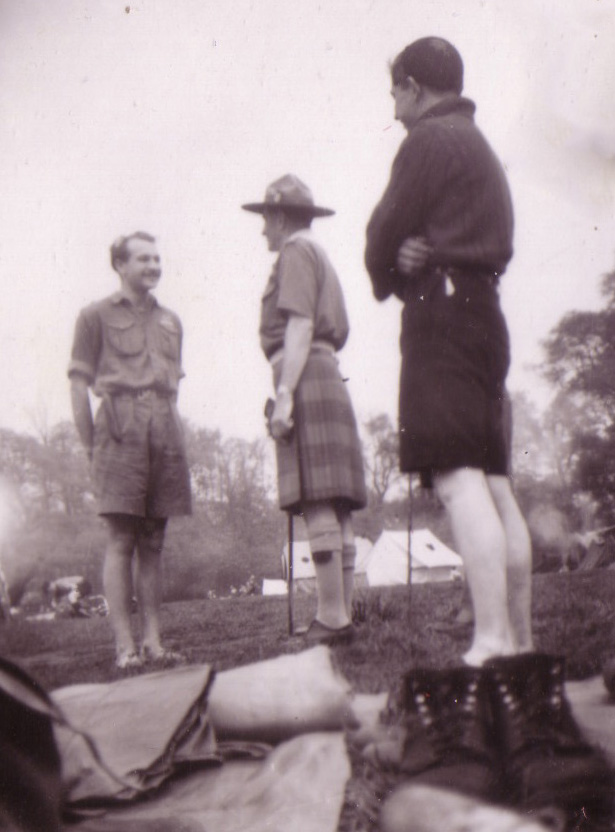
Norwegian Scouts from Bergen meet Lord Rowallan (centre) at Gilwell Park in 1950.

Rowallan had become the Boy Scouts Association district commissioner for north-west Ayrshire in 1922. In 1944, the Boy Scouts Association appointed him Scottish headquarters commissioner for leader training. In 1945, the Boy Scouts Association appointed him as its Chief Scout of the United Kingdom and Dependant Territories in February and Chief Scout of the British Commonwealth and Empire in April, appointments he retained until 1959. Rowallan also served on the International Conference of the Boy Scout Movement's committee from 1947 until 1953.

As the Boy Scouts Association's Chief Scout, Rowallan travelled widely, encouraging the post-war growth of Scouting; his tours included:

- Belgium (April 1945)
- Canada (August – September 1946)
- Gambia, Sierra Leone, Gold Coast and Nigeria including the West African Jamboree (January – March 1947)
- United States of America (May 1948)
- Australia and New Zealand (1948–49)
- Union of South Africa, Northern Rhodesia, Southern Rhodesia and Nyasaland (January – March 1950)
- Kenya, Zanzibar, Tanganyika and Uganda (October – December 1950)
- Antigua, Bahamas, Barbados, Bermuda, British Guiana, British Honduras, Dominica, Grenada, Jamaica, Saint Lucia, Saint Kitts, Saint Vincent and Trinidad (January – April 1952)
- Suez Canal Zone, Cyprus, Gibraltar, Malta, Greece and Italy (May – June 1954)
- Scandinavia (July 1954)
- Borneo, Brunei, Ceylon, Hong Kong, Malaya, Sarawak and Singapore (September – October 1954)
- Australia including the Pan-Pacific Jamboree, Papua New Guinea, Fiji, Tonga and the Solomon Islands (December 1955 – February 1956)
- Canada (September – October 1958)
- Southern Rhodesia including the Central African Jamboree (May 1959)

In 1957, the International Conference of the Boy Scout Movement's committee awarded Rowallan its only distinction, the Bronze Wolf, for exceptional services to world Scouting. The Boy Scouts of America awarded Rowallan its highest award, the Silver Buffalo Award in 1948. Scout camp sites in Riddells Creek in Victoria, and Wrexham in Wales are named after him, as is the Kenya Scouts Association Headquarters Campsite in Nairobi.

== Other awards and recognition ==
- Knight of the Order of the Thistle in March 1957.
- Freedom of the City of Edinburgh, March 1957
- 1954, a Britannia Class Locomotive (No. 70045) was named in his honour.

== Arms ==
Coat of arms of Thomas Corbett, 2nd Baron Rowallan
Crest A branch of oak thereon a raven Sable. Escutcheon Quarterly 1st & 4th Argent a key fesseways wards downwards between two ravens Sable (Corbett) 2nd & 3rd Azure a chevron Or between two bears’ heads couped Argent muzzled Gules in chief and in base a cross moline of the third (Polson). Supporters Dexter a salmon Proper holding in its mouth a jewelled ring Or, Sinister a seal Proper. Motto Deus Pascit Corvos

Government offices
Preceded by Sir Ronald Cross	Governor of Tasmania; 1959–1963	Succeeded by Sir Charles Gairdner
Peerage of the United Kingdom
Preceded by Archibald Corbett	Baron Rowallan; 1933–1977	Succeeded by Arthur Cameron Corbett
The Boy Scouts Association
Preceded by The Lord Somers	The Boy Scouts Association's Chief Scout of the British Commonwealth and Empire; 1945–1959	Succeeded by The Lord Maclean
