= Arthur Corbett, 3rd Baron Rowallan =

British Baron (1919–1993)

The Right Honourable The Lord Rowallan

Personal details
- Born: 17 December 1919
- Died: 24 June 1993 (aged 73) Marbella, Spain
- Spouse(s): Eleanor Mary Boyle (m. 1945; div. 1961) April Ashley (m. 1963; ann. 1970)
- Children: 4 (including 4th Lord Rowallan)
- Parent(s): Thomas Corbett, 2nd Baron Rowallan; Gwyn Mervyn Grimond
- Education: Eton College

Military service
- Allegiance: United Kingdom
- Branch/service: British Army
- Rank: Captain

Captain Arthur Cameron Corbett, 3rd Baron Rowallan (17 December 1919 – 24 June 1993), was a British aristocrat most notable for successfully having his second marriage annulled in 1970 on the grounds that his wife April Ashley, a transgender woman, was legally male. This case is known as Corbett v Corbett.

== Early life ==
Arthur Cameron Corbett was born on 17 December 1919 to Thomas Godfrey Polson Corbett, 2nd Baron Rowallan (1895–1977), who was Chief Scout of the British Commonwealth and Empire and served as Governor of Tasmania from 1959 to 1963, and Gwyn Melvyn Grimond, daughter of Joseph Bowman Grimond of St Andrews, Fife. His maternal uncle was Jo Grimond, Baron Grimond, the leader of the Liberal Party 1956–67.

He was one of six children born to his parents. One of his four brothers was killed in action in 1944. He was educated at Eton, followed by Magdalen College, Oxford.

== Second World War ==
He was commissioned as a 2nd Lieutenant in the Ayrshire Yeomanry effective from 2 September 1939, following training as an Officer Cadet in the Oxford University OTC. In July 1940 he was transferred to the Royal Artillery, as the regiment re-rolled to create two regiments of Field Artillery. By the end of the war he was a temporary Major, and was Mentioned in Dispatches on 8 November 1945 "in recognition of gallant and distinguished service in North-West Europe"

== Personal life ==
=== First marriage and children ===
Corbett was married to Eleanor Mary Boyle from 1945 to 1962. They had four children:

- John Polson Cameron Corbett, 4th Baron Rowallan (born 8 March 1947)
- Hon Sarah Elizabeth Cameron Corbett (born 5 April 1949)
- Hon Anne Mary Cameron Corbett (born 3 September 1953)
- Hon Rosalind Eleanor Cameron Corbett (born 2 January 1958)

=== Cross-dressing ===
At the beginning of his marriage to Eleanor, Corbett occasionally dressed in women's clothes a few times a year - something that he had desired to do from a younger age - with his wife's knowledge, and then later, secretly. He is recorded as saying: "I didn't like what I saw. You want the fantasy to appear right. It utterly failed to appear right in my eyes." From around 1948 he began to meet with people around London who shared his interest and began to seek out sexual encounters with some of them.

=== Relationship with April Ashley ===
While still living with his wife and children, Corbett invited April Ashley to lunch at Le Caprice on 19 November 1960. At the time Ashley was a successful fashion model who had appeared in Vogue (photographed by David Bailey) and in the film The Road to Hong Kong, starring Bing Crosby and Bob Hope. Corbett had got to know of Ashley through her work as a 'female impersonator' at Le Carrousel de Paris and made contact with her through a US acquaintance, Louise. When seeing Ashley for the first time, he recalls thinking: "This was so much more than I could ever hope to be. The reality was far greater than my fantasy [...] It far outstripped any fantasy for myself. I could never have contemplated it for myself". It was Corbett's interest in cross-dressing that had initially prompted his meeting with Ashley, but he soon developed a romantic interest in her and the they began to see each other regularly. Corbett is known to have introduced April to his family. In the three years leading up to their marriage, the couple did not engage in sex, only kissing. Ashley recounted that "[Corbett's] emotions swung about like a pendulum, from feeling jealous of her as a woman [...] to jealous feelings about other men who were attracted to her."

The two married in 1963, but the marriage quickly broke down. Ashley's lawyers wrote to Corbett in 1966 demanding maintenance payments and in 1967 Corbett responded by filing suit to have the marriage annulled. The annulment was granted in 1970 on the grounds that Ashley was male, even though Corbett knew about her history when they married. The argument was accepted, and the case served as a precedent until the Gender Recognition Act 2004.

== Later life and death ==
Corbett succeeded his father, Thomas Corbett, as the 3rd Baron Rowallan on 30 November 1977.

Corbett later moved to Marbella, Spain, where he died after undergoing surgery on his leg for gangrene on 24 June 1993, at the age of 73. Upon his death in 1993, his eldest son, John Corbett, 4th Baron Rowallan, succeeded to his title, Baron Rowallan.

== Arms ==
Coat of arms of Arthur Corbett, 3rd Baron Rowallan
Crest A branch of oak thereon a raven Sable. Escutcheon Quarterly 1st & 4th Argent a key fesseways wards downwards between two ravens Sable (Corbett) 2nd & 3rd Azure a chevron Or between two bears' heads couped Argent muzzled Gules in chief and in base a cross moline of the third (Polson). Supporters Dexter a salmon Proper holding in its mouth a jewelled ring Or, Sinister a seal Proper. Motto Deus Pascit Corvos

Peerage of the United Kingdom
Preceded by Thomas Godfrey Polson Corbett	Baron Rowallan; 1977–1993	Succeeded by John Polson Cameron Corbett
