= April Ashley =

English transgender activist (1935–2021)

April Ashley MBE
- Ashley at the Southbank Centre, 2009
- Born: 29 April 1935; Liverpool, England
- Died: 27 December 2021 (aged 86); London, England
- Resting place: Ford Cemetery
- Other names: Toni April; The Hon. Mrs Corbett; April West
- Occupations: Model; activist; author
- Height: 1.78 m (5 ft 10 in)
- Spouses: The Hon. Arthur Corbett (m. 1963; ann. 1970) Jeffrey West (m. 1980; div. 1990)
- Website: aprilashley.org

April Ashley MBE (29 April 1935 – 27 December 2021), styled as The Honourable Mrs Corbett from 1963 to 1980, was an English model, author, and LGBT rights activist. In the 1950s, upon being discharged from the Merchant Navy, she performed under the stage name Toni April at Le Carrousel de Paris in Paris. Ashley was outed as a transgender woman by The Sunday People newspaper in 1961 and was one of the earliest British people known to have had gender confirmation surgery. Her first marriage, to the future 3rd Baron Rowallan, was annulled in the High Court of Justice case of Corbett v Corbett. Ashley was appointed a Member of the Order of the British Empire in the 2012 Birthday Honours for services to transgender equality.

== Early life ==
Born at 126 Smithdown Road (then Sefton General Hospital) in Liverpool, Ashley was one of six surviving children of a Roman Catholic father, Frederick Jamieson, and Protestant mother, Ada Brown, who had married two years before.

During her childhood in Pitt Street, Ashley suffered from both calcium deficiency, requiring weekly calcium injections at the Alder Hey Children's Hospital, and bed-wetting, resulting in her being punished so severely by her mother that the police were almost called and subsequently being given her own box room, at the age of two, when the family moved to a different house.

Ashley started to experience gender incongruence during her childhood. It has been suggested that she may have had "some abnormality in androgenisation at puberty" whereby her body did not masculinise as expected.

== 1950s to 1970s ==
=== Navy ===
Ashley joined the Merchant Navy in 1951 at the age of 16. She recalls, in her biography, being anxious of other sailors seeing her curvaceous body. She experienced bullying, physical violence and older men flirting with her and making sexual advances which made her afraid and excited at once. One younger sailor she liked appeared to reciprocate her feelings and kissed her one night in her cabin. But when two of his friends came in laughing, it turned out he had been insincere.

Following this incident, Ashley's health began to deteriorate and when on land in San Pedro she went to see a doctor to discuss the feelings she had been having surrounding her gender identity. She was told she would grow out of it and was prescribed anti-depressant amphetamines and barbiturate sleeping pills, and to seek out a psychiatrist when back in England. Ashley became dejected and tried to kill herself by overdosing with pills, but survived and was admitted to Seaside Memorial Hospital, Long Beach, California. She was then sent to the Norwegian Seamen's Church in Los Angeles.

=== Return to England ===
Ashley was given dishonourable discharge and returned to England. In Liverpool she frequented gay bars with her friend Roxy, including the Stork Hotel where many of the patrons dressed in "semi-drag", but felt like she had no future.

She tried to kill herself again by jumping into the Mersey and was admitted to Ormskirk District General Hospital psychiatric unit, where patients were not allowed to shave and the windows and doors were barred. She was discharged and referred to Walton Hospital, Liverpool, as an out-patient at age 17.

While in the unit, Ashley underwent treatment for approximately six months that included 'therapeutic interviews' where she was asked, often while being administered amytal or ether, about her gender and sexuality; being given male hormones; being injected with sodium pentothal; and electric shock therapy. With the doctors at a loss of how to further treat her, Ashley was discharged.

Ashley began an affair with a man named Vic whom she'd met at the Stork Hotel, but it was not a successful relationship. She then started a catering course, but quit after a string of disappointing placements which included a pub in Cheshire and a couple of hotels in Rhyl and St Asaph in Wales. She later moved to London with her friend Ronnie Cogan with whom she shared a flat. They worked cleaning tables at Lyon's Corner House on Coventry Street, taking benzedrine to keep them awake during their night shifts. She then worked in Jersey, where she had a summer fling with a man named Joey who had initially assumed Ashley to be a cisgender woman.

In her book The First Lady, Ashley tells the story of the rape she endured before transitioning. A roommate raped her and she was severely injured.

=== Gender transition ===
Ashley moved back to London, having started calling herself Toni. She claimed to have at one point shared a boarding house with then ship's steward John Prescott, later deputy prime minister of the United Kingdom. Having started dressing in a more feminine manner and holidaying in France, she moved to Paris in the late 1950s, began using the name Toni April, and joined the cast of the drag cabaret at Le Carrousel de Paris alongside Coccinelle to whom she became somewhat of a protégée. While in Paris she began taking feminising hormones including oestrogen at age 20 (although Ashley stated elsewhere that she had started taking them at age 18).

At the age of 25, having saved £3,000, Ashley had a seven-hour-long experimental sex reassignment surgery on 11 May 1960, performed in Casablanca, Morocco, by Georges Burou. She had been told there was a 50/50 chance of surviving the operation, and when she woke from the surgery Burou greeted her by saying "Bonjour, Mademoiselle." All of her hair fell out, and she endured significant pain, but the operation was successful.

=== Modelling career and public outing ===
After returning to Britain, she began using the name April Ashley and was recognised for National Insurance taxes as a woman. She became a successful fashion model, appearing as lingerie model in British Vogue,for which she was photographed by David Bailey. She had a small role in the 1962 film The Road to Hong Kong, which starred Bing Crosby and Bob Hope.

A friend sold her story to the media for £5 and on 19 November 1961 The Sunday People outed Ashley as a trans woman, under the headline "'Her' secret is out." She responded on 6 May 1962 by telling her story in an article called "My Strange Life" for The News of the World.

Ashley became a centre of attention and scandal after her outing and her film credit was dropped. Her agency also cancelled her upcoming booked work. She told the Liverpool Echo about the impact of her outing on her career: "My career was destroyed, and apart from jobs where you were paid under the table, I never worked again".

=== Marriage and legal case ===
In November 1960, Ashley met Arthur Corbett (later 3rd Baron Rowallan), the Eton-educated son and heir of Lord Rowallan. They married in 1963 but the marriage soon deteriorated, at which point Ashley claimed to have a romance with Íñigo de Arteaga y Martín, the heir to the Dukedom of the Infantado. Ashley's lawyers wrote to Corbett in 1966 demanding maintenance payments and in 1967 Corbett responded by filing suit to have the marriage annulled. The annulment was granted in 1970 on the grounds that Ashley was male and that "it was not possible to legally change sex," despite Corbett knowing about her history when they married. Ashley later described this ruling as "cruel".

The case is known as Corbett v Corbett and became a landmark legal ruling in the United Kingdom,until the Gender Recognition Act 2004 allowed people to legally change gender and the enactment of the Equality Act 2010.

The case and impact on legal definitions of sexual identity, marriage, and transgender rights has been analysed at length by Christopher Hutton in The Tyranny of Ordinary Meaning: Corbett V Corbett and the Invention of Legal Sex (2019).

After the court case, Ashley opened a restaurant in Knightsbridge with a friend, called April and Desmond's.

== Later life and death ==
After a heart attack in London in 1975, Ashley retired for some years to the Welsh border town of Hay-on-Wye. In her book April Ashley's Odyssey she stated that Amanda Lear was assigned male at birth and that they had worked together at Le Carousel where Lear had used the drag name Peki d'Oslo.

Ashley had once been great friends with Lear, but according to Ashley's book The First Lady they had had a major falling out and had not spoken for years.

In the 1980s, Ashley married Jeffrey West on the cruise ship RMS Queen Mary in Long Beach, California, US. They lived in California and subsequently divorced, but maintained friendly relations. In the 1990s, Ashley was employed by the environmental lobby group, Greenpeace and later by an art gallery.

Ashley returned to the United Kingdom in 2005. She talked about her life at St George's Hall, Liverpool as part of the city's Homotopia Festival on 15 November 2008, and on 18 February 2009 at the Southbank Centre in London.

In 2015, Ashley advised Eddie Redmayne on playing a transgender woman, Lili Elbe, during the filming of The Danish Girl. Also in 2015, Ashley appeared on ITV's talk show Loose Women. She featured on the cover of Attitude and was interviewed for the magazine by Paris Lees.

Ashley latterly lived in Fulham, southwest London. She died at home on 27 December 2021, at the age of 86.She was buried at Ford Cemetery, Litherland, with her father and grandparents.

== Impact ==
April Ashley's Odyssey, a biography by Ashley and Duncan Fallowell, was published in 1982. In 2006, Ashley released her autobiography, The First Lady, and made TV appearances on Channel Five News, This Morning and BBC News. In one interview she said, "This is the real story and contains a lot of things I just couldn't say in 1982", including alleged affairs with Michael Hutchence, Peter O'Toole, Omar Sharif, Turner Prize sculptor Grayson Perry and others. The book was pulled from the market, however, after it was discovered that it heavily plagiarized the 1982 book written by Fallowell.

The 1983 biography of Peter O'Toole by Michael Freedland rejects the claim of an affair with Ashley. It states that he was acquainted with her in Spain while filming, but his then-wife Siân Phillips was with him at the time and knew the relationship to be platonic.

In 2012, Pacific Films and Limey Yank Productions announced a project to create a film about Ashley's life.

In July 2022, Channel 4 broadcast the documentary The Extraordinary Life Of April Ashley.

Bonjour, Mademoiselle!: April Ashley and the pursuit of a lovely life, a biography of Ashley by historians Jacqueline Kent and Tom Roberts, which also explored the social and political context of Ashley's life and times, was published by Scribe in 2024.

Ashley is featured along with Amanda Lear in the 2025 HBO documentary, Enigma.

== Awards and honours ==
Ashley was appointed Member of the Order of the British Empire (MBE) in the 2012 Birthday Honours for services to transgender equality.

The exhibition 'April Ashley: Portrait of a Lady' was held at the Museum of Liverpool from 27 September 2013 to 1 March 2015, with the support of the Heritage Lottery Fund.

Ashley was awarded a Lifetime Achievement honour at the European Diversity Awards 2014.

In December 2016, Ashley was awarded an Honorary Doctorate from the University of Liverpool.

In 2019, Ashley was awarded an Honorary Doctorate from the University of London.
